= Premios TVyNovelas =

Television recognition of excellence

- Awarded for: Best Actors, telenovelas and TV programs
- Country: Mexico
- Presented by: Magazine TVyNovelas and Televisa
- First award: June 1983; 43 years ago
- Final award: October 31, 2020; 6 years ago
- Website: esmas.com

The Premios TVyNovelas were presented annually by Televisa and the magazine TVyNovelas to honor the best Mexican television productions, including telenovelas. Instituted in 1983, the award ceremony rotates between Mexico City and Acapulco. The ceremony is broadcast through Canal de las Estrellas in Mexico and Latin America, and Univision in the United States. For the first time in its 30-year history, Canal de las Estrellas and Univision had broadcast Premios TVyNovelas simultaneously on April 28, 2013.

The awards show has been on an indefinite hiatus since the 2020 edition.

== Ceremonies ==
Ceremony	Date	Host(s)	Venue
1st TVyNovelas Awards	June 1983	—N/a	—N/a
2nd TVyNovelas Awards	1984	Luis Miguel	—N/a
3rd TVyNovelas Awards	May 21, 1985	Claudia Córdova, Juán Calderón	Centro Libanés, Mexico D.F.
4th TVyNovelas Awards	1986	Raúl Velasco, Luis Miguel	Centro Libanés, Mexico D.F.
5th TVyNovelas Awards	1987	Raúl Velasco, Gloria Calzada	Centro Libanés, Mexico D.F.
6th TVyNovelas Awards	April 18, 1988	Claudia Córdova, Raúl Velasco	Centro Libanés, Mexico D.F.
7th TVyNovelas Awards	May 10, 1989	Lucero	Centro Libanés, Mexico D.F.
8th TVyNovelas Awards	April 2, 1990	Joaquín Cordero, Roxana Saucedo	Centro de Espectáculos “Premier“, Mexico D.F.
9th TVyNovelas Awards	April 8, 1991	Juan Calderón, Gloria Calzada; Rebecca de Alba, Gabriela Goldsmith; Lucero	Centro de Espectáculos “Premier“, Mexico D.F.
10th TVyNovelas Awards	1992	Raúl Velasco	Mexico D.F.
11th TVyNovelas Awards	March 29, 1993	Raúl Velasco, Liza Echeverría; Rebecca de Alba, Luis de la Corte; Lorena Tassinari	Mexico D.F.
12th TVyNovelas Awards	April 29, 1994	Raúl Velasco	Mexico D.F.
13th TVyNovelas Awards	April 29, 1995	Edith González, Alfredo Adame; César Évora	Mexico D.F.
14th TVyNovelas Awards	May 7, 1996	Erika Buenfil, Eduardo Santamarina	Mexico D.F.
15th TVyNovelas Awards	May 15, 1997	Raúl Velasco, Marco Antonio Regil; Julissa, Liza Echeverría	Teatro Alameda, San Ángel, Mexico D.F.
16th TVyNovelas Awards	1998	Rebecca de Alba, Alfredo Adame	Mexico D.F.
17th TVyNovelas Awards	March 28, 1999	Daniela Romo, Marco Antonio Regil	Mexico D.F.
18th TVyNovelas Awards	May 30, 2000	Marco Antonio Regil, Adela Micha	Mexico D.F.
19th TVyNovelas Awards	May 8, 2001	Jacqueline Bracamontes, Alfredo Adame; Raúl de Molina, Adriana Riveramelo; Lorena Herrera, Toño de Valdés; Ernesto Laguardia, Montserrat Olivier	Mexico D.F.
20th TVyNovelas Awards	July 4, 2002	Raúl Velasco, Ernesto Laguardia; Luis de la Corte, Gloria Calzada	Mexico D.F.
21st TVyNovelas Awards	May 31, 2003	Marco Antonio Regil, Rebecca de Alba	Mexico D.F.
22nd TVyNovelas Awards	March 3, 2004	Víctor Noriega, Laisha Wilkins	Mexico D.F.
23rd TVyNovelas Awards	April 23, 2005	René Strickler, Lucero	Mexico D.F.
24th TVyNovelas Awards	May 13, 2006	Eduardo Santamarina, Joana Benedek	Forum Mundo Imperial, Acapulco, Guerrero
25th TVyNovelas Awards	May 12, 2007	Lucero	Forum Mundo Imperial, Acapulco, Guerrero
26th TVyNovelas Awards	April 27, 2008	Yuri	Forum Mundo Imperial, Acapulco, Guerrero
27th TVyNovelas Awards	March 15, 2009	Yuri	Forum Mundo Imperial, Acapulco, Guerrero
28th TVyNovelas Awards	March 14, 2010	Yuri	Forum Mundo Imperial, Acapulco, Guerrero
29th TVyNovelas Awards	March 6, 2011	Jacqueline Bracamontes, Alan Tacher	Forum Mundo Imperial, Acapulco, Guerrero
30th TVyNovelas Awards	February 24, 2012	Jacqueline Bracamontes, Alan Tacher; Ximena Navarrete	Forum Mundo Imperial, Acapulco, Guerrero
31st TVyNovelas Awards	April 28, 2013	Galilea Montijo, Alan Tacher; Yuri	Forum Mundo Imperial, Acapulco, Guerrero
32nd TVyNovelas Awards	March 23, 2014	Galilea Montijo, Alan Tacher; Adrián Uribe	Plaza Condesa, Mexico City
33rd TVyNovelas Awards	March 8, 2015	Galilea Montijo, Andrea Legarreta; Alan Tacher, Adrián Uribe	Mexico City
34th TVyNovelas Awards	April 17, 2016	Marjorie de Sousa, Gabriel Soto	Acapulco, Guerrero
35th TVyNovelas Awards	March 26, 2017	Maite Perroni, Cristián de la Fuente	Mexico City
36th TVyNovelas Awards	February 18, 2018	Jacqueline Bracamontes, Inés Gómez Mont	Mexico City
37th TVyNovelas Awards	March 10, 2019	Arath de la Torre, Montserrat Oliver	Mexico City
38th TVyNovelas Awards	October 31, 2020	Michelle Rodríguez, Jorge van Rankin	Mazatlán, Sinaloa

== Awards ==
=== Continued awards ===
Category	Year
Best Telenovela	1983–2020
Best Actress	1983–2020
Best Actor	1983–2020
Best Antagonist Actress	1983–2020
Best Antagonist Actor	1983–2020
Best Leading Actress	1986–2004, 2006–2020
Best Leading Actor	1986-2004, 2006–2020
Best Co-lead Actress	1991-1992, 2002, 2004, 2008–2020
Best Co-lead Actor	1991-1992, 2002, 2004, 2008–2020
Best Musical Theme	1994-1996, 1998-2001, 2003–2007, 2010–2020
Best Original Story or Adaptation	1986-1993, 1995-2001, 2004, 2008-2010, 2012–2020
Best Direction	1985-1988, 1990-1993, 1995-2003, 2005-2010, 2013–2020
Best Direction of the Cameras	1988-1993, 1995-1999, 2001, 2009-2010, 2016–2020
Best Series	2008–2014, 2017–2018, 2020
Best Actress in a Drama Series	2017–2018, 2020
Best Actor in a Drama Series	2017–2018, 2020
Best Actress in a Comedy Series	1983-1995, 1999, 2001-2003, 2007, 2020
Best Actor in a Comedy Series	1983-1995, 1999, 2001-2003, 2007, 2020
Best Comedy Program	1983-1993, 2000, 2002-2008, 2017-2020
Best Variety Program	1983-1994, 2001, 2003, 2005-2020
Best Pay Television Program	2007–2020
Best Unit Program	2014–2020

=== Discontinued awards ===
Category	Year
Best Supporting Actress	1993, 1995-2003, 2005–2007, 2013-2018
Best Supporting Actor	1993, 1995-2003, 2005–2007, 2013-2018
Best Young Lead Actress	1985-2000 2006, 2009–2019
Best Young Lead Actor	1985-2000 2006–2007, 2009–2019
Best Female Revelation	1983-2004, 2008-2013, 2016–2017
Best Male Revelation	1983-1991, 1993-1997, 2001–2004, 2009-2013, 2016-2017
Best Child Performance	1983-1986, 1988, 1990-1993, 1997, 2001, 2006, 2008
Best Multiplatform Telenovela	2014-2016
Best Cast	2015-2019

=== Honorary awards ===
- In 2002, 20 honorary awards were presented to 20 performers (the best of each year), celebrating the 20th anniversary of the award ceremony.

=== Los favoritos del público ===
In 2013, Premios TVyNovelas introduced Los favoritos del público, a new mechanism that allowed telenovela fans to vote for their favorite nominees from eight different categories using a Twitter account.

== Records and facts ==
Telenovelas with most nominations

Nominations	Telenovela
21	Mi marido tiene más familia
20	La candidata
19	Antes muerta que Lichita
18	Abismo de pasión
18	Caer en tentación
17	Abrázame muy fuerte
17	El hotel de los secretos
17	La doble vida de Estela Carrillo
17	La sombra del pasado
16	La fea más bella
15	Amar a muerte
14	Agujetas de color de rosa
14	A que no me dejas
14	Cuna de lobos (1986)
14	El manantial
14	La antorcha encendida
14	La madrastra (2005)
14	La vecina
14	Lazos de amor
14	Like
14	Mentir para vivir
14	Por ella soy Eva
14	Vivir un poco
14	Yo no creo en los hombres (2014)
13	Amores verdaderos
13	Cadenas de amargura
13	Corazón salvaje (1993)
13	El color de la pasión
13	El privilegio de amar
13	Mi marido tiene familia
13	Mi segunda madre
13	Papá a toda madre
13	Sin rastro de ti
13	Vencer el miedo
12	Alcanzar una estrella
12	Alma de Hierro
12	Cañaveral de pasiones
12	De frente al sol
12	Destilando amor
12	El maleficio (1983)
12	Hijas de la luna
12	Laberintos de pasión
12	La mentira
12	Pasión
12	Primer amor, a mil por hora
12	Rebelde
12	Ringo
12	Tú o nadie
11	Alborada
11	Amarte es mi pecado
11	Amor bravio
11	Amor real
11	Cuando llega el amor
11	De pura sangre
11	Esmeralda
11	Heridas de amor
11	Imperio de cristal
11	La usurpadora (2019)
11	Lo que la vida me robó
11	María Mercedes
11	Mi corazón es tuyo
11	Para volver a amar
11	Soy tu dueña
11	Tres veces Ana
11	Una familia con suerte
11	Yo compro esa mujer
10	El vuelo del águila
10	Fuego en la sangre
10	La otra
10	Me declaro culpable
10	Niña amada mía
10	Qué pobres tan ricos
10	Tres mujeres
10	Victoria

Telenovelas with most awards

Awards	Telenovela
14	Amar a muerte
12	El privilegio de amar
10	Caer en tentación
10	Cañaveral de pasiones
10	Corazón salvaje (1993)
10	Cuna de lobos (1986)
10	Destilando amor
10	El manantial
10	El vuelo del águila
9	Abrázame muy fuerte
9	Amores verdaderos
9	Amor real
9	La antorcha encendida
8	Alma de Hierro
8	Cadenas de amargura
8	De frente al sol
8	La candidata
8	Quinceañera
7	Alborada
7	A que no me dejas
7	De pura sangre
7	Imperio de cristal
7	Laberintos de pasión
7	La fea más bella
7	La usurpadora (2019)
7	Lazos de amor
7	Para volver a amar
7	Primer amor, a mil por hora
7	Rubí (2004)
7	Yo no creo en los hombres (2014)
6	Abismo de pasión
6	Amor en silencio
6	La otra
6	María Mercedes
6	Mi segunda madre
6	Por ella soy Eva
5	Agujetas de color de rosa
5	El malefiico (1983)
5	La fuerza del destino
5	La traición
5	Lo que la vida me robó
5	Mujeres engañadas
5	Pasión y poder (2015)
5	Pueblo chico, infierno grande
5	Yo compro esa mujer

Telenovelas that won the main awards (Best Telenovela, Best Actress and Best Actor)

Telenovela	Year
La traición	1985
Cuna de lobos	1987
Corazón salvaje	1994
Lazos de amor	1996
Cañaveral de pasiones	1997
El privilegio de amar	1999
El manantial	2002
La otra	2003
Amor real	2004
Rubí	2005
Alborada	2006
Destilando amor	2008
Hasta que el dinero nos separe	2010
Amar a muerte	2019

Telenovelas that have won all nominations

Telenovela	Awards	Year
El vuelo del águila	10	1995
Quinceañera	8	1988
Pueblo chico, infierno grande	5	1998
Nuevo amanecer	3	1989
El premio mayor	3	1996
La fiera	2	1985
Las secretas intenciones	2	1993
Amor gitano	2	2000
Chispita	1	1983
Toda una vida	1	1983
Bianca Vidal	1	1984
Esperándote	1	1986
Dos vidas	1	1989
Flor y canela	1	1989
Morir para vivir	1	1990
Alcanzar una estrella II	1	1992
Al filo de la muerte	1	1992
Bajo un mismo rostro	1	1996
El alma no tiene color	1	1998
Huracán	1	1998
Salud, dinero y amor	1	1998
Mi pequeña traviesa	1	1999
DKDA: Sueños de juventud	1	2000
Infierno en el paraíso	1	2000
Serafín	1	2000
Inocente de ti	1	2005
Pablo y Andrea	1	2006
Libre para amarte	1	2014

Most nominated telenovelas without a win

Telenovela	Nominations	Year
El color de la pasión	13	2015
Sin rastro de ti	13	2017
Hijas de la luna	12	2019
Heridas de amor	11	2007
Amor de nadie	9	1992
Corazón salvaje	9	2010
Por amar sin ley	9	2019
Las dos caras de Ana	8	2007
Dos hogares	8	2012
Corazón indomable	8	2014
Porque el amor manda	8	2014
Cuna de lobos	8	2020
Amar sin límites	7	2007
Al diablo con los guapos	7	2009
Llena de amor	7	2011
Amor de barrio	7	2016
Enamorándome de Ramón	7	2018
Sin tu mirada	7	2018
Cita a ciegas	7	2020

== See also ==
- Latin American television awards
