= 4th TVyNovelas Awards =

1986 Mexican TV awards

- Date: 1986
- Location: Centro Libanés, Mexico City, Mexico D.F., Mexico
- Hosted by: Raúl Velasco & Luis Miguel

Highlights
- Most awards: De pura sangre (7)
- Most nominations: Vivir un poco (14)

Television/radio coverage
- Network: Canal de las Estrellas

The 4th TVyNovelas Awards were an academy of special awards to the best of soap operas and TV shows. The awards ceremony took place on 1986 in the Centro Libanés in Mexico D.F. The ceremony was televised in Mexico by Canal de las Estrellas.

Raúl Velasco and Luis Miguel hosted the show. De pura sangre won 7 awards, the most for the evening, including Best Telenovela. Other winners Tú o nadie won 5 awards, Vivir un poco won 4 awards and Angélica, El ángel caído and Esperándote won 1 each.

== Summary of awards and nominations ==
Telenovela	Nominations	Awards
Vivir un poco	14	4
Tú o nadie	12	5
De pura sangre	11	7
Angélica	5	1
El ángel caído	2	1
Juana Iris	2	0
Esperándote	1	1

== Winners and nominees ==
=== Telenovelas ===
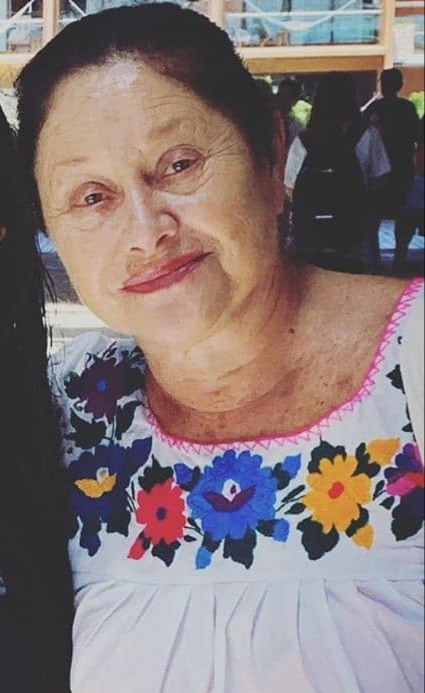
Angélica Aragón, winner for Best Actress.

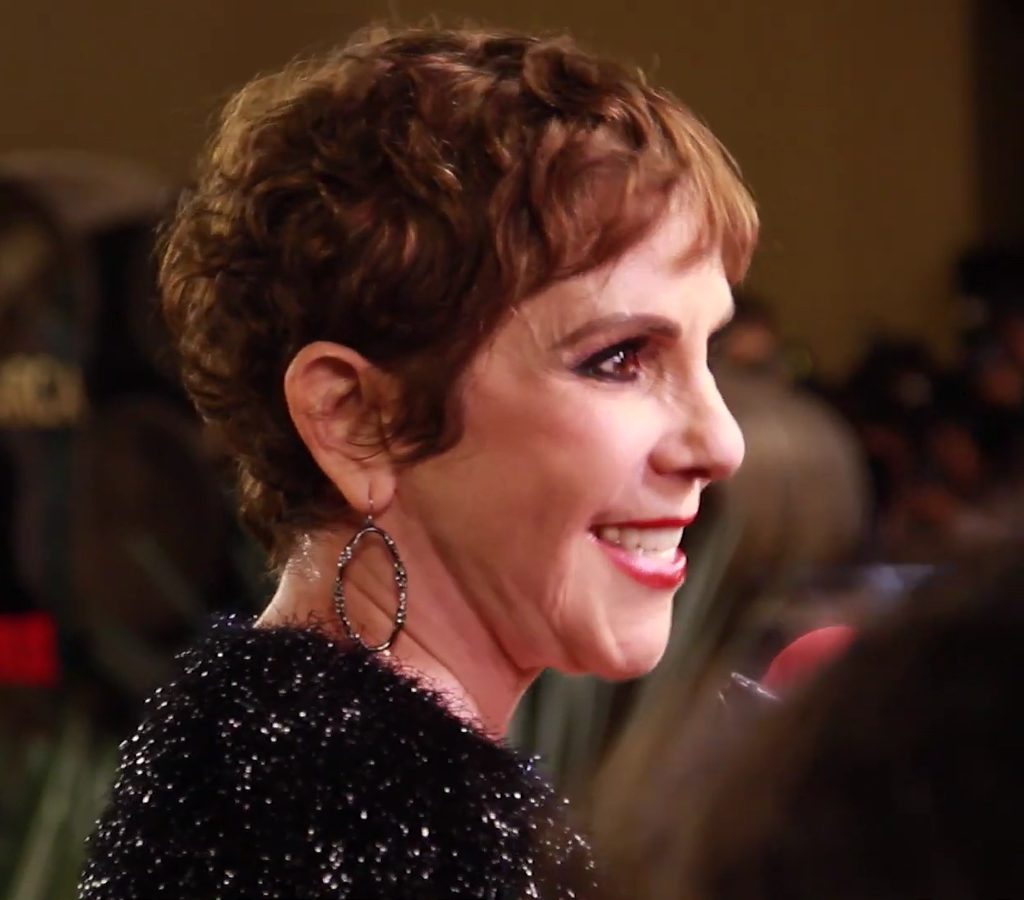
Rebecca Jones, winner for Best Antagonist Actress.

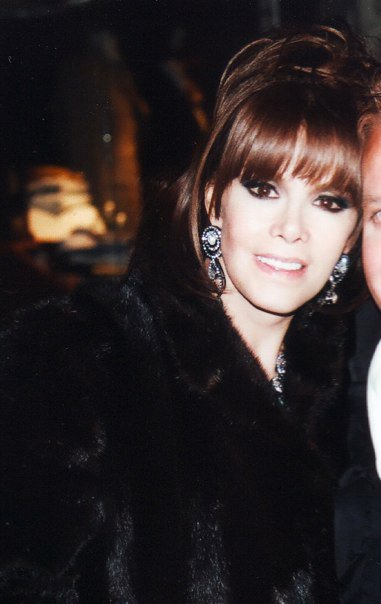
Lucia Mendez, winner for Best Female TV-Singer.

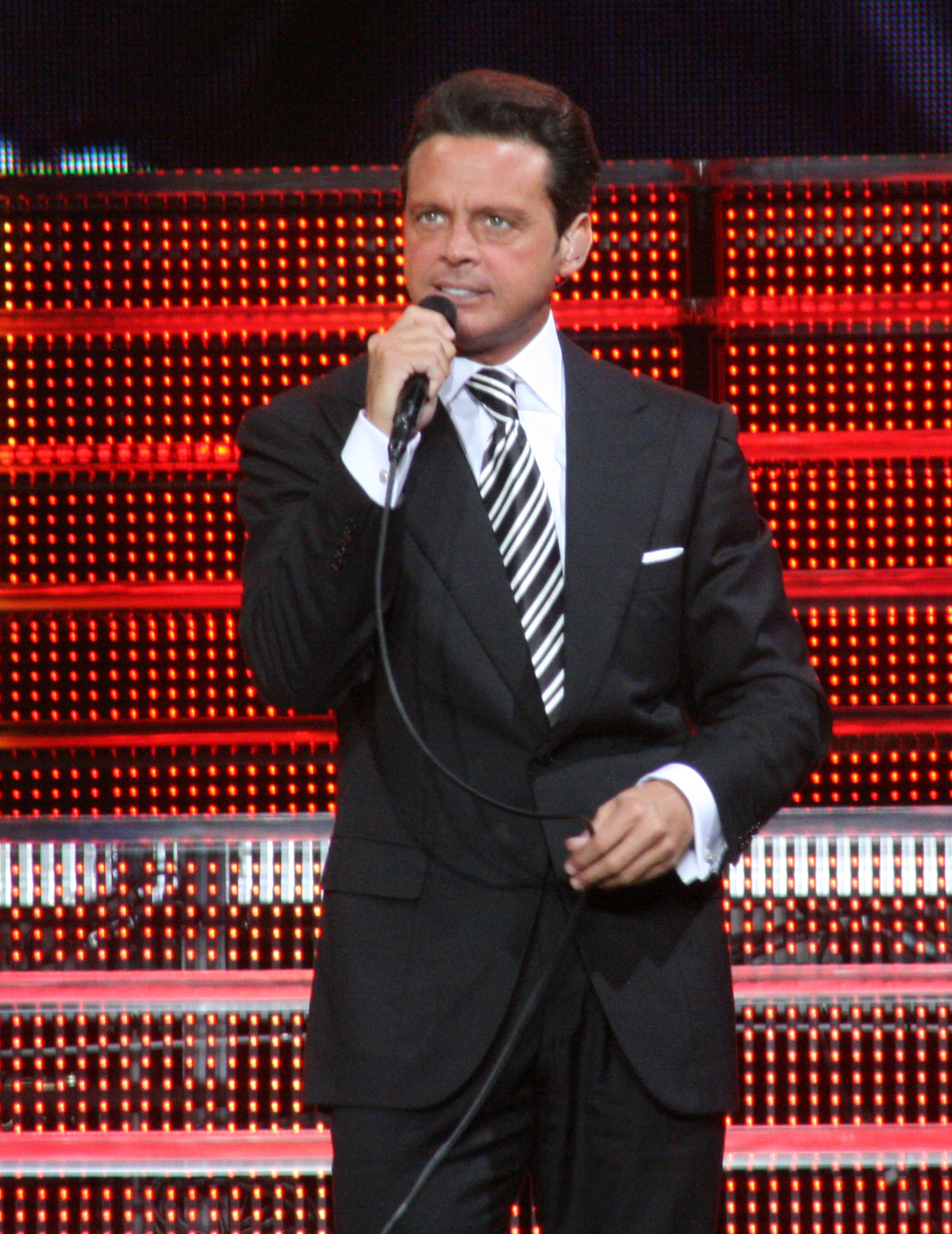
Luis Miguel, winner for Best Male TV-Singer.

Best Telenovela	Best Production
De pura sangre; Tú o nadie; Vivir un poco	Ernesto Alonso – De pura sangre
Best Actress	Best Actor
Angélica Aragón – Vivir un poco; Christian Bach – De pura sangre; Lucía Mendez – Tu o nadie	Humberto Zurita – De pura sangre; Andrés García – Tú o nadie; Rogelio Guerra – Vivir un poco
Best Antagonist Actress	Best Antagonist Actor
Rebecca Jones – El ángel caído; Úrsula Prats – Tú o nadie; Beatriz Sheridan – Vivir un poco	Salvador Pineda – Tú o nadie; Alejandro Camacho – Angélica; Enrique Álvarez Félix – De pura sangre
Best Experienced Actress	Best Experienced Actor
Magda Guzmán – Tú o nadie; Alicia Rodríguez – De pura sangre; Emilia Carranza – Angélica	Miguel Manzano – Tú o nadie; Augusto Benedico – Vivir un poco; Rafael Inclán – Vivir un poco
Best Young Lead Actress	Best Young Lead Actor
Luz María Jerez – Tú o nadie; Alma Delfina – Vivir un poco; Delia Casanova – De pura sangre	Juan Antonio Edwards – Vivir un poco; Arturo Peniche – Vivir un poco; Jaime Garza – Vivir un poco
Best Female Revelation	Best Male Revelation
Ofelia Cano – De pura sangre; Jacaranda Alfaro – De pura sangre; Luz María Jerez – Tú o nadie	Arturo Peniche – Vivir un poco; Luis Xavier – Tú o nadie; Pedro Fernández – Juana Iris
Best Original Story or Adaptation	Best Direction
María Zarattini – De pura sangre; María Zarattini – Tú o nadie; Paulinho de Oliveira and Carlos Romero – Vivir un poco	José Rendón – De pura sangre; Rafael Banquells – Vivir un poco; Sergio Jiménez – Angélica

=== Other Awards ===
Best Debut Actress	Best Debut Actor
Patricia Pereyra – Vivir un poco; Adela Noriega – Juana Iris; Paola Moreli – Tú o nadie	Luis Xavier – De pura sangre; Claudio Reyes Rubio – El ángel caído; Rafael Amador – Angélica
Best Child Actress	Best Child Actor
Nayelli Saldívar – Esperándote; Ginny Hoffman – Chiquilladas; Pituka and Petaka – Chiquilladas	César Adrián Chávez – Angélica; Carlos Espejel – Chiquilladas; Pierre Angelo – Chiquilladas

=== Comedy and Variety Programs ===
Best Comedy Program	Best Entertainment or Variety Program
La carabina de Ambrosio; El Chavo del Ocho; No empujen; Salón de belleza	Siempre en domingo; En vivo; XE-TU; Vídeo éxitos
Best Comedy Actress	Best Comedy Actor
Maribel Fernández – La carabina de Ambrosio; Chela Castro – No empujen; Florinda Meza – El Chavo del Ocho; María Antonieta de las Nieves – El Chavo del Ocho	Luis de Alba – La carabina de Ambrosio; Alfredo Alegría – Las aventuras de Lenguardo; Pompín Iglesias – Mi secretaria; Roberto Gómez Bolaños – El Chavo del Ocho
Revelation in Comedy	Revelation as a Host or Hostess
María Elena Saldaña – Salón de belleza; Flor Trujillo – Mi secretaria; Lázara – Chispas de chocolate; Olivia Collins – No empujen	Marcos Valdés – Estrellas de los 80; Elsa Saavedra – Vídeo rock; Gabriela Rivero – XE-TU; Patty García de Mendoza – Estrellas de los 80
Best Hostess	Best Host
Claudia Córdova – Estrellas de los 80; Gloria Calzada – Vídeo éxito; Pati Chapoy – El mundo del espectáculo; Talina Fernández – Nuevas noches	Raúl Velasco – Siempre en domingo; René Casados – XE-TU; Ricardo Roch – En vivo; Víctor Gordoa – El mundo del espectáculo
Best Female TV-Singer	Best Male TV-Singer
Lucia Mendez; Lupita D'Alessio; Tatiana; Yuri	Luis Miguel; Emmanuel; José José; Óscar Athié
Revelation as a TV-Singer	Debut as a TV-Singer
Pandora; Guadalupe Pineda; Rocío Banquells	Flans; Jorge Muñiz; Marco Valdés

=== Special awards ===
- Recognition for Artistic Career: Rafael Baledón
- Recognition for Journalistic Career: Carl Hillos

=== Absent ===
People who did not attend the ceremony and were nominated in the shortlist in each category:

- Humberto Zurita
- Luis de Alba
- Pati Chapoy (Verónica Castro received the award in her place)
- Salvador Pineda
