= La traición =

La traición may refer to:

- La traición (2008 TV series), a Colombian-American telenovela
- La traición (1984 TV series), a Mexican telenovela
