= Socorro Bonilla =

Mexican actress

- Born: María del Socorro Martínez Ortega; Camargo, Chihuahua, México
- Other name: Socorro Martínez
- Occupation: Actress
- Years active: 1968-present
- Spouse: Héctor Bonilla (divorced)
- Children: Leonor Bonilla; Sergio Bonilla
- Relatives: Gonzalo Martínez Ortega (brother); Alma Delfina (sister); Mario Iván Martínez (brother); Margarita Isabel (sister-in-law)

Socorro Bonilla (born María del Socorro Martínez Ortega) is a Mexican actress.

== Filmography ==
Telenovelas, Series, Films
Year	Title	Role	Notes
1968	Rubí	Nurse	Supporting role
1978-79	Viviana	Lupita	Supporting role
1979-80	Los Ricos También Lloran	Graciela Jiménez	Supporting role
1981	El hogar que yo robé	Diana	Protagonist
1981	Mojado Power	Daisy	Film
1983	Lola the Truck Driver	Leoncio's Girl	Film
1981-84	Cachún cachún ra ra!	Profesora Valladares	TV series
1982-83	Chispita		Special appearance
1984-85	Sí, mi amor	Alicia	Supporting role
1986	Cicatrices del alma	Sister Refugio	Supporting role
1986-87	El padre Gallo	Yolanda	Supporting role
1989	Luz y sombra	Leticia	Supporting role
1990	Mi pequeña Soledad	Toña	Supporting role
1992	Carrusel de las Américas		Supporting role
1992	Anoche soñé contigo	Irma	Film
1993	La vida conyugal	Magdalena/Jacqueline Cascorro	Film
1994-95	El vuelo del águila	Margarita Maza de Juárez	Supporting role
1995-07	Mujer, casos de la vida real		21 episodes
1996	Marisol	Doña Rosa "Rosita" Suárez	Supporting role
1996	La Antorche Encendida	Esperanza	Supporting role
1997	Pueblo chico, infierno grande	Inmaculada de Beltrán	Supporting role
1997	La jaula de oro	Doña Tere	Supporting role
1998	Gotita de amor	Prudencia de Olmos	Supporting role
1999	Un dulce olor a muerte	Clotilde	Film
1999-00	Laberintos de pasión	Matilde de González	Supporting role
1999-00	Tres mujeres	Aracely Durán	Supporting role
2000-01	Primer amor... a mil por hora	Milagros García	Supporting role
2001-02	Carita de Ángel	Doña Cruz	Supporting role
2001-02	El Manantial	Norma de Morales	Supporting role
2003	Niña Amada Mía	Casilda de Criollo	Supporting role
2003	La tregua	Pilar	Film
2003-04	Mariana de la Noche	Nelly	Supporting role
2004-05	Apuesta por un amor	Lázara Jiménez	Supporting role
2006-07	Las dos caras de Ana	Doña Julia Vivanco vda. de Escudero	Supporting role
2006-07	Amar sin límites	Gloria Provenzano	Supporting role
2007	Muchachitas como tú	Esther Cervantes de Olivares #2	Supporting role
2008	Querida Enemiga	Zulema Ruiz de Armendáriz	Co-Protagonist
2008	Mujeres Asesinas	Norma	Episode: "Jéssica, tóxica"
2009	Encrucijada	Alejandra Rendon	TV series
2010-11	Para volver a amar	Ofelia	Special appearance
2011	Como dice el dicho		Episode: "Tanto peca el que mata la vaca"
2012-13	Un Refugio para el Amor	Magdalena "Magda" Ramos	Supporting role
2014	La rosa de Guadalupe	Esthela	Episode: "Primas y Amigas"
2014	La Gata	Mercedes "Doña Meche" Reyes	Supporting role
2017	Mi adorable maldición	Macrina Romero	Antagonist
2018	Y mañana séra otro día	Chabela	Supporting role
2021	Fuego ardiente	Socorro	Supporting role

== Awards and nominations ==
Year	Award	Category	Film	Result
1994	Ariel Award	Best Supporting Actress	La vida conyugal	Nominated
