= TVyNovelas Award for Best Leading Actress =

Recognition as the Best actress on television programs

- Awarded for: Best performance by an actress in a leading role
- First award: 1986; Magda Guzmán; Tú o nadie
- Currently held by: 2020; Arcelia Ramírez; Vencer el miedo

== Winners and nominees ==
=== 1980s ===
| Winner | Nominated |
4th TVyNovelas Awards
| Magda Guzmán for Tú o nadie | Alicia Rodríguez for De pura sangre; Emilia Carranza for Angélica; Irma Lozano for Vivir un poco |
5th TVyNovelas Awards
| María Rubio for Cuna de Lobos | Carmen Montejo for Cuna de lobos; Lilia Michel for Lista negra; Surya MacGregor for Martín Garatuza |
6th TVyNovelas Awards
| Rosario Gálvez for Victoria | Blanca Sánchez for Senda de gloria; Elsa Cárdenas for El precio de la fama |
7th TVyNovelas Awards
| Jacqueline Andere for Nuevo amanecer | Adriana Roel for El Extraño Retorno de Diana Salazar; Martha Roth for El pecado de Oyuki |

=== 1990s ===
| Winner | Nominated |
8th TVyNovelas Awards
| Patricia Reyes Spíndola for Teresa | |
9th TVyNovelas Awards
| Ofelia Guilmáin for Días sin luna | Irán Eory for Cuando llega el amor; Isabela Corona for Yo compro esa mujer; Rita Macedo for Alcanzar una estrella; Susana Alexander for Cuando llega el amor |
10th TVyNovelas Awards
| Irán Eory for La Pícara Soñadora | Aurora Molina for Cadenas de amargura; Pilar Pellicer for Muchachitas |
11th TVyNovelas Awards
| Ada Carrasco for De frente al sol | Blanca Sánchez for La sonrisa del Diablo; Evita Muñoz "Chachita" for Ángeles sin paraíso |
12th TVyNovelas Awards
| Claudia Islas for Corazón salvaje | Alicia Montoya for Valentina; María Teresa Rivas for Capricho |
13th TVyNovelas Awards
| Jacqueline Andere for El vuelo del águila | Carmelita González for Volver a Empezar; María Teresa Rivas for Agujetas de color de rosa |
14th TVyNovelas Awards
| Marga López for Lazos de Amor | Irán Eory for María la del Barrio; Silvia Derbez for Lazos de Amor |
15th TVyNovelas Awards
| Angélica María for Bendita mentira | Angélica Aragón for Cañaveral de Pasiones; Ofelia Medina for Para toda la vida |
16th TVyNovelas Awards
| Jacqueline Andere for Mi querida Isabel | Carmen Montejo for Te sigo amando; Katy Jurado for Te sigo amando; Raquel Olmedo for Esmeralda; Patricia Reyes Spíndola for María Isabel; Silvia Derbez for Los hijos de nadie |
17th TVyNovelas Awards
| Marga López for El Privilegio de Amar | Libertad Lamarque for La usurpadora; Rosa María Bianchi for La Mentira |

=== 2000s ===
| Winner | Nominated |
18th TVyNovelas Awards
| Norma Herrera for Tres mujeres | Angélica María for Rosalinda; Irán Eory for Por tu amor |
19th TVyNovelas Awards
| Helena Rojo for Abrázame muy fuerte | Carmen Montejo for Amigos x siempre; Marga López for La casa en la playa |
20th TVyNovelas Awards
| Daniela Romo for El Manantial | Beatriz Aguirre for Sin pecado concebido; Patricia Reyes Spíndola for Salomé |
21st TVyNovelas Awards
| Jacqueline Andere for La Otra | Emilia Carranza for Niña amada mía; María Victoria for De pocas, pocas pulgas |
22nd TVyNovelas Awards
| Ana Martín for Amor Real | Patricia Reyes Spíndola for Mariana de la noche; Silvia Pasquel for Amarte es mi Pecado |
~~2005~~
24th TVyNovelas Awards
| Delia Casanova for La esposa virgen | Ana Martín for La Madrastra; Helena Rojo for Peregrina; Raquel Olmedo for Piel de otoño |
25th TVyNovelas Awards
| Helena Rojo for Mundo de fieras | Angélica María for La fea más bella; Diana Bracho for Heridas de amor; María Rubio for Las dos caras de Ana; María Sorté for Amar sin limites |
26th TVyNovelas Awards
| Ana Martín for Destilando Amor | Isela Vega for Pasión; Silvia Mariscal for Muchachitas como tú |
27th TVyNovelas Awards
| Helena Rojo for Cuidado con el ángel | Ana Bertha Espín for Las tontas no van al cielo; Dacia González for Al diablo con los guapos |

=== 2010s ===
| Winner | Nominated |
28th TVyNovelas Awards
| Daniela Romo for Sortilegio | Carmen Salinas for Hasta que el dinero nos separe; Daniela Castro for Mi pecado; Helena Rojo for Corazón salvaje |
29th TVyNovelas Awards
| Magda Guzmán for Para volver a amar | Ana Martín for Soy tu dueña; Laura Zapata for Zacatillo, un lugar en tu corazón; María Sorté for Mar de amor; Silvia Pinal for Soy tu dueña |
30th TVyNovelas Awards
| Delia Casanova for La fuerza del destino | Ana Bertha Espín for La que no podía amar; Carmen Salinas for Triunfo del amor; Lucía Méndez for Esperanza del corazón; Patricia Reyes Spíndola for Rafaela |
31st TVyNovelas Awards
| Blanca Guerra for Abismo de pasión | Helena Rojo for Por ella soy Eva; Raquel Olmedo for Abismo de pasión |
32nd TVyNovelas Awards
| Ana Martín for Amores verdaderos | Cynthia Klitbo for De que te quiero, te quiero; Daniela Romo for La Tempestad |
33rd TVyNovelas Awards
| Rosa María Bianchi for Yo no creo en los hombres | Ana Bertha Espín for Lo que la vida me robó; Helena Rojo for El color de la pasión; Patricia Reyes Spíndola for El color de la pasión |
34th TVyNovelas Awards
| Leticia Calderón for A que no me dejas | Silvia Pasquel for Antes muerta que Lichita; Cynthia Klitbo for La sombra del pasado; Isela Vega for Muchacha italiana viene a casarse; Ana Bertha Espín for Que te perdone Dios |
35th TVyNovelas Awards
| Helena Rojo for La candidata | Daniela Romo for El hotel de los secretos; Blanca Guerra for Tres veces Ana; Patricia Reyes Spíndola for Un camino hacia el destino; Cynthia Klitbo for Vino el amor |
36th TVyNovelas Awards
| Silvia Pinal for Mi marido tiene familia | Julieta Egurrola for Caer en tentación; Daniela Romo for En tierras salvajes; Zaide Silvia Gutiérrez for La doble vida de Estela Carrillo; Raquel Pankowsky for Papá a toda madre |
37th TVyNovelas Awards
| Raquel Garza for Amar a muerte | Cynthia Klitbo for Hijas de la luna; Isela Vega for Like; Diana Bracho for Mi marido tiene familia; Carmen Salinas for Mi marido tiene familia |

=== 2020s ===
| Winner | Nominated |
38th TVyNovelas Awards
| Arcelia Ramírez for Vencer el miedo | Azela Robinson for Cuna de lobos; Queta Lavat for La usurpadora; Silvia Mariscal for Ringo; Victoria Ruffo for Cita a ciegas |

== Records ==
- Most awarded actress: Jacqueline Andere and Helena Rojo, 4 times.
- Most nominated actress: Helena Rojo with 8 nominations.
- Most nominated actress without a win: Ana Bertha Espín with 4 nominations.
- Youngest winner: Patricia Reyes Spíndola, 36 years old.
- Youngest nominee: Daniela Castro, 40 years old.
- Oldest winner: Silvia Pinal, 86 years old.
- Oldest nominee: Libertad Lamarque, 91 years old.
- Actresses that winning the award for the same role: Magda Guzmán (Tú o nadie, 1986) and Daniela Romo (Sortilegio, 2010)
- Actress winning after short time: Helena Rojo by (Mundo de fieras, 2007) and (Cuidado con el ángel, 2009), 2 years difference.
- Actress winning after long time: Magda Guzmán by (Tú o nadie, 1986) and (Para volver a amar, 2011), 25 years difference.
- Actresses winning this category, despite having been as a main villain:
  - María Rubio (Cuna de lobos, 1987)
  - Ofelia Guilmáin (Días sin luna, 1991)
  - Claudia Islas (Corazón salvaje, 1994)
  - Jacqueline Andere (Mi querida Isabel, 1998)
  - Marga López (El Privilegio de Amar, 1999)
  - Helena Rojo (Abrázame muy fuerte, 2001)
  - Daniela Romo (El Manantial, 2002)
  - Jacqueline Andere (La Otra, 2003)
  - Helena Rojo (Mundo de fieras, 2007)
  - Blanca Guerra (Abismo de pasión, 2013)
  - Rosa María Bianchi (Yo no creo en los hombres, 2015)
- Actresses was nominated in this category, despite having played as a main villain:
  - Surya MacGregor (Martín Garatuza, 1987)
  - Martha Roth (El pecado de Oyuki, 1989)
  - Susana Alexander (Susana Alexander, 1991)
  - María Teresa Rivas (Agujetas de color de rosa, 1994)
  - Angélica Aragón (Cañaveral de pasiones, 1997)
  - Beatriz Aguirre (Sin pecado concebido, 2002)
  - Silvia Pasquel (Amarte es mi pecado, 2004)
  - Diana Bracho (Heridas de amor, 2007)
  - Helena Rojo (Corazón salvaje, 2010)
  - Daniela Castro (Mi pecado, 2010)
  - Laura Zapata (Zacatillo, un lugar en tu corazón, 2011)
  - Lucía Méndez (Esperanza del corazón, 2012)
  - Ana Bertha Espín (La que no podía amar, 2012)
- Foreign winning actress:
  - Ofelia Guilmáin from Spain
  - Irán Eory from Iran
  - Marga López from Argentina
  - Angélica María from United States
  - Rosa María Bianchi from Argentina
