= Alma Delfina =

Mexican actress

- Born: Alma Delfina Martínez Ortega; 5 November 1956 (age 69); Camargo, Chihuahua, Mexico
- Occupation: Actress
- Years active: 1974-present
- Children: Natalia Smith Martínez
- Relatives: Gonzalo Martínez Ortega (brother); Socorro Bonilla (sister); Mario Iván Martínez (nephew); Héctor Bonilla (brother-in-law); Margarita Isabel (sister-in-law)

Alma Delfina (née Martínez Ortega) is a Mexican actress.

== Acting career ==
She started her career in 1974 in the telenovela Mundo de juguete. In the 1970s she was active principally on movies. In the 1980s acted in soap operas like Guadalupe (1984), Vanessa (1982) with Lucía Méndez, Chispita (1983), Vivir un poco (1985) with Angelica Aragón and Marionetas (1987). In the 1990s starred Cañaveral de Pasiones (1996) and Pueblo chico, infierno grande with Verónica Castro in the role of the evil prostitute La Beltraneja. In 1999 she moved to the United States. Starred in TV series like ER and CSI: Miami (2002). In the 2005 she returns to Mexican telenovelas with her appearance in the Fonovideo/Televisa production Inocente de Ti. Throughout the 2000s, Delfina would appear in multiple productions for Fonovideo/Televisa (El Amor No Tiene Precio, Bajos Las Riendas Del Amor), Univision (Vidas Cruzadas, El Talisman, Cosita Linda), and Azteca (Vidas Robadas, Bajo El Alma). In 2016, Alma Delfina joined the cast of the NBC soap opera Days of Our Lives as Adriana Hernandez.

== Personal life ==
She is the sister of director Gonzalo Martinez Ortega, writer Mario Iván Martínez and actresses Socorro Bonilla and Evangelina Martínez. She is also the aunt of actors Roberto Sosa, Evangelina Sosa and Mario Iván Martínez.

== Filmography ==
Telenovelas, Series, Films
Year	Title	Role	Notes
1974	Mundo de juguete		Supporting role
1975	Barata de primavera	Marisa	Supporting role
1976	Length of War		Film
1978	La hora del silencio	Maribel	Supporting role
1978	Rosalía	Dacia	Supporting role
1978	Sabado, Loco Loco		TV series
1979	La Chicharra!		Episode: "El atropellado"
1979	J.J. Juez		Supporting role
1979	El cielo es para todos		Supporting role
1979	Mi amor frente al pasado		Supporting role
1979	Ratero	Lolita	Film
1979	En la trampa		Film
1980	El tonto que hacía milagros	Luisa Miranda	Film
1980	Colorina	La Pingüica	Supporting role
1981	El hogar que yo robe	Carmita	Supporting role
1981	Odisea Burbujas		Episode: "La Bella Durmiente"
1981-84	Cachún cachún ra ra!	Baby	TV series
1982	Vanessa	Lolita	Supporting role
1982-83	Chispita	Gloria	Supporting role
1984	Guadalupe	Guadalupe	Protagonist
1984	¡¡Cachún cachún ra-ra!! (Una loca, loca, preparatoria)	Baby	Film
1984	Delincuente		Film
1985	Mexican, You Can Do It	Irma	Film
1985	El Hombre de la mandolina		Film
1985	Vivir un poco	Paulina Fernández	Supporting role
1986	Marionetas	Laura Contreras	Protagonist
1986	El trailer asesino		Film
1986	Casos de alarma	Carolina	Film
1987	El misterio de la casa abandonada	Angélica	Film
1987	Entre vecinos te veas		Film
1987	Dinastía sangrienta		Film
1987-88	El rincón de los prodigios	Mari	Protagonist
1988	Relajo matrimonial		Film
1988	El costo de la vida		Film
1989	La portera ardiente	Adelita	Film
1989	Salvajes		Film
1989	Olor a muerte		Film
1991	Acapulco		Film
1992	En legítima defensa		Film
1992	Carrusel de las Américas	Maestra Lupita	Supporting role
1994-95	El vuelo del águila	Delfina Ortega Díaz	Supporting role
1996	Cañaveral de Pasiones	Prudencia	Supporting role
1997	Pueblo chico, infierno grande	Magdalena Beltrán "La Beltraneja"	Main antagonist
1999-00	Laberintos de pasión	Sofía Miranda de Valencia	Special appearance
1999-00	Hablame de amor	Adriana Domínguez de Elgeta	Main antagonist
2001	ER	Receptionist	Episode: "The Longer You Stay"
2002	Presidio Med		2 episodes: "With Grace" "This Baby's Gonna Fly"
2002	CSI: Miami	Estella De Soto	Episode: "Wet Foot/Dry Foot"
2003	Skin	Maid	Episode: "Pilot"
2003-04	Te amare en silencio	Angélica	Supporting role
2004	Sueño	Beatriz	Film
2004	Silver City	Lupe Montoya	Film
2004-05	Inocente de ti	Lupe	Supporting role
2005-06	El amor no tiene precio	Flor Méndez de Carbajal	Supporting role
2007	Bajo las riendas del amor	Rosa Nieto	Supporting role
2009-10	Vidas robadas	Aurora Sandoval	Special appearance
2011	Bajo el alma	Concepción "Conchita" de Negrete	Supporting role
2012	El Talismán	Matilde Aceves	Supporting role
2014	Cosita Linda	Doña Santa de Rincón	Supporting role
2016	Days of Our Lives	Adriana Hernandez	Supporting role
2019	Betty en NY	Julia Lozano de Rincón	Supporting role
2022	Mi secreto	Elena Mendoza	Supporting role
2024	Mi amor sin tiempo	Jesusa	Supporting role
2024-25	Juegos interrumpidos	Lidia García	Supporting role
2025	Mi verdad oculta	Clementina Pérez	Supporting role

== Awards and nominations ==
Year	Award	Category	Nominee	Result
1985	TVyNovelas Awards	Best Young Lead Actress	Guadalupe	Nominated
1986	TVyNovelas Awards	Best Young Lead Actress	Vivir un poco	Nominated
1989	TVyNovelas Awards	Best Young Lead Actress	El rincón de los prodigios	Nominated
1997	TVyNovelas Awards	Best Co-star Actress	Cañaveral de pasiones	Won
1998	TVyNovelas Awards	Best Co-star Actress	Pueblo chico, infierno grande	Nominated
1987	Ariel Award	Best Supporting Actress	Casos de alarma	Nominated
1989	Ariel Award	Best Actress	El costo de la vida	Nominated
