= Angélica (TV series) =

- Genre: Telenovela; Drama
- Created by: Marissa Garrido
- Directed by: Sergio Jiménez
- Starring: Erika Buenfil; Sergio Goyri; Alejandro Camacho; Emilia Carranza; Chela Castro; Eduardo Liñán
- Opening theme: El despertar al amor by Erika Buenfil
- Country of origin: Mexico
- Original language: Spanish
- No. of episodes: 124

Production
- Executive producer: Ernesto Alonso
- Cinematography: Carlos Guerra
- Running time: 21–22 minutes
- Production company: Televisa

Original release
- Network: Canal de las Estrellas
- Release: April 17 – October 7, 1985

Related
- La traición; De pura sangre

Angélica is a Mexican telenovela produced by Ernesto Alonso for Televisa in 1985. It is an original story by Marissa Garrido and directed by Sergio Jiménez.

Erika Buenfil and Sergio Goyri starred as protagonists, while Alejandro Camacho and Rebecca Jones starred as main antagonists.

== Cast ==
- Erika Buenfil as Angélica Estrada
- Sergio Goyri as Humberto Corona
- Alejandro Camacho as Guillermo Corona
- Emilia Carranza as Rosaura Monterde
- Chela Castro as Eloísa
- Eduardo Liñán as Alfonso
- Gloria Mayo as Carmen
- Rebecca Jones as Silvia
- Amparo Arozamena as Aunt Chabela
- Olivia Collins as Leticia
- Rafael Amador as Manuel
- Juan Diego Fernández as Juan
- Lucianne Silva as Mónica
- Marco Muñoz as Rafael
- Selene Higareda as Mayra
- Myrrah Saavedra as Teresa
- Carmen Cortés as Nana
- Jorge Victoria as Fernando
- César Adrián Sánchez as Toño
- Arturo Angler as Bernabé
- Héctor Madrigal as Federico
- Edgardo Gazcón as Carlos
- Francisco Avendaño as Mario
- Macario Álvarez as Lic. Olmos
- Toño Infante as Capitán Trejo
- Luis Xavier as José Luis
- Maristel Molina as Srta. López
- Ricardo González as Javier
- Fernando Moncada as El Grande
- José Pereira as Raúl
- José Luis Llamas as Doctor
- José Carlos Teruel as Roby
- Norma Iturbe as Secretary
- Ricardo Salas as Javier
- Diego Schoening

== Awards ==
Year	Award	Category	Nominee	Result
1986	4th TVyNovelas Awards	Best Telenovela of the Year	Ernesto Alonso	Nominated
1986	4th TVyNovelas Awards	Best Actress	Erika Buenfil	Nominated
1986	4th TVyNovelas Awards	Best Actor	Sergio Goyri	Nominated
1986	4th TVyNovelas Awards	Best Antagonist Actor	Alejandro Camacho	Nominated
1986	4th TVyNovelas Awards	Best Leading Actress	Emilia Carranza	Nominated
1986	4th TVyNovelas Awards	Best Female Revelation	Olivia Collins	Nominated
1986	4th TVyNovelas Awards	Best Direction	Sergio Jiménez	Nominated
1986	4th TVyNovelas Awards	Best Original Story or Adaptation	Marissa Garrido	Nominated
1986	4th TVyNovelas Awards	Best Child Performance	César Adrián Chávez	Won
1986	4th TVyNovelas Awards	Best Male Debut	Rafael Amador	Nominated
