= Cañaveral de Pasiones =

Mexican telenovela

- Genre: Telenovela
- Created by: Caridad Bravo Adams
- Based on: Una sombra entre los dos / Al pie del altar
- Written by: Cuauhtemoc Blanco; María del Carmen Peña
- Directed by: Claudio Reyes Rubio; Benjamín Cann; Angélica Aragón
- Starring: Daniela Castro; Juan Soler; Francisco Gattorno; Patricia Navidad; Angélica Aragón; Leonardo Daniel; Fernando Balzaretti; Alma Delfina
- Theme music composer: Amparo Rubín
- Opening theme: Instrumental
- Country of origin: Mexico
- Original language: Spanish
- No. of episodes: 92

Production
- Executive producers: Christian Bach; Humberto Zurita
- Producer: Gerardo Zurita
- Production locations: Xalapa, Veracruz
- Cinematography: Manuel Ruiz Esparza
- Editor: Mónica Rodríguez
- Running time: 41-44 min.
- Production company: Televisa

Original release
- Network: Canal de las Estrellas
- Release: April 22 – September 6, 1996

Related
- Canavial de Paixões (2003); Abismo de pasión (2012)

Cañaveral de pasiones is a Mexican telenovela produced by Christian Bach and Humberto Zurita for Televisa and broadcast by Canal de las Estrellas in 1996.

Daniela Castro, Francisco Gattorno, Angélica Aragón, Leonardo Daniel, Fernando Balzaretti and Alma Delfina starred in this telenovela.

== Plot ==
The story takes place among the sugar cane fields of the state of Veracruz, where the slander and spite caused by a lie forever mark the lives of two families and four friends who met being children: Julia (Daniela Castro), Pablo (Juan Soler), Juan de Dios (Francisco Gattorno) and Mireya (Patricia Navidad).

Cañaveral de pasiones is a telenovela that revolves around the life of Julia Santos, a noble and extremely beautiful girl, friend of Mireya and the love of Pablo and Juan de Dios, who lives besieged by the resentment and bitterness that her own family has built around her.

Julia will have to fight against the ghosts that inhabit the mind of her father, Fausto (Leonardo Daniel); against the ill will of Dinora Faberman (Azela Robinson), her aunt, and against the calumnies that have been made up in town concerning her mother and herself.

Pablo, the son of Josefina Montero (Angélica Aragón), is Julia's love. Both represent the love that is born in the first years of life and that grows with the passage of time, becoming stronger and stronger. It is a love that must fight against the pressures that try to destroy it, using moral concepts, good customs and family honor as a banner.

After 15 years, Pablo returns to town, engaged to Gina (Marisol Santacruz), a superficial and opportunistic young girl. The reunion with Julia causes a sudden change in Pablo's life, who, realizing his love for her, faces great obstacles, including his own mother, whom hatred has made her loathe Julia and her family.

Cañaveral de pasiones is the story of four loves, of four passions that, with strength, courage, nobility and youth, will have to overcome adverse circumstances so that the shadows fade and their love grows, sweet and strong as cane.

== Cast ==
=== Main cast ===
- Daniela Castro as Julia
  - Zoraida Gómez as Child Julia
- Juan Soler as Pablo
  - Sebastián Zurita as Child Pablo
- Francisco Gattorno as Juan de Dios
  - Raúl Castellanos as Child Juan de Dios
- Patricia Navidad as Mireya
  - Marisol Centeno as Child Mireya
- Angélica Aragón as Josefina
- Leonardo Daniel as Fausto
- Fernando Balzaretti as Father Cuco
- Alma Delfina as Prudencia

=== Supporting cast ===
- Jorge Russek as Samuel
- María Eugenia Ríos as Amalia
- Josefina Echánove as Remedios
- Elizabeth Dupeyrón as Socorro
- Marisol Santacruz as Gina
- Liza Willert as Carlota
- Tony Bravo as Rafael
- Norma Lazareno as Hilda
- Rodrigo Abed as Guillermo
- Aracely Arámbula as Lety
- Dacia Arcaráz as Chayo
- Héctor Cruz as Vicente
- Josafat Luna as Leopoldo
- Roberto Miquel as Enrique
- Carlos Navarro as Gildardo
- Gilberto Román as Dr. Cisneros
- Azela Robinson as Dinora
- Roberto Ballesteros as Rufino

=== Guest stars ===
- César Évora as Amador
- Felicia Mercado as Margarita

== Awards and nominations ==
Year	Award	Category	Nominee(s)	Result
1997	TVyNovelas Awards	Best Telenovela	Christian Bach; Humberto Zurita	Won
1997	TVyNovelas Awards	Best Actress	Daniela Castro	Won
1997	TVyNovelas Awards	Best Actor	Juan Soler	Won
1997	TVyNovelas Awards	Best Antagonist Actress	Azela Robinson	Nominated
1997	TVyNovelas Awards	Best Antagonist Actor	Roberto Ballesteros	Won
1997	TVyNovelas Awards	Best Leading Actress	Angélica Aragón	Nominated
1997	TVyNovelas Awards	Best Leading Actor	Jorge Russek	Won
1997	TVyNovelas Awards	Best Supporting Actress	Alma Delfina	Won
1997	TVyNovelas Awards	Best Supporting Actor	Leonardo Daniel	Won
1997	TVyNovelas Awards	Best Female Revelation	Patricia Navidad	Won
1997	TVyNovelas Awards	Best Original Story or Adaptation	Cuauhtémoc Blanco; María del Carmen Peña	Won
1997	TVyNovelas Awards	Best Direction	Claudio Reyes Rubio; Benjamín Cann	Won
