= Cita a ciegas =

Mexican telenovela

- Genre: Telenovela; Romantic comedy
- Based on: Ciega a citas by Carolina Aguirre
- Written by: Andrés Burgos; Itzel Lara; Pedro Ortiz de Pinedo; Edwin Valencia; Gaby Ruffo; Oscar Ortíz de Pinedo; Mario Iván Sánchez
- Directed by: Juan Carlos Muñoz
- Starring: Victoria Ruffo; Arturo Peniche; Sofía Garza; Gonzalo Peña; Omar Fierro
- Theme music composer: Slivana Medrano; Octavio Castañeda
- Opening theme: "Así como soy" by Sofía Garza and Viviana Barrera
- Country of origin: Mexico
- Original language: Spanish
- No. of seasons: 1
- No. of episodes: 70

Production
- Executive producer: Pedro Ortiz de Pinedo
- Producer: Liliana Cuesta Aguirre
- Production location: Mexico City
- Camera setup: Multi-camera
- Production company: Televisa

Original release
- Network: Las Estrellas
- Release: 29 July – 1 November 2019

Cita a ciegas (English: Blind Date) is a Mexican telenovela produced by Pedro Ortiz de Pinedo, based on the Argentine telenovela titled Ciega a citas created by Carolina Aguirre. It stars Victoria Ruffo, Arturo Peniche, Omar Fierro, Sofía Garza, and Gonzalo Peña. It premiered on 29 July 2019, and ended on 1 November 2019.

Filming began on 20 May 2019 and concluded in October 2019.

== Plot ==
Lucía is a vlogger whose life depends on other people's opinions, and especially that of Maura, her mother, who watches over her all day. When Lucía's sister announces her engagement, her mother begins to worry about Lucía's appearance and emotional stability, betting that she will attend the wedding alone, dressed in black and heavier than ever. Lucía will have 258 days to lose weight, change her image and find a boyfriend. The bet with her mother goes viral and throughout the story Lucía shares the events of each blind date.

== Cast ==
- Victoria Ruffo as Maura Fuentes de Salazar
- Arturo Peniche as Federico Salazar
- Sofía Garza as Lucía González Fuentes
- Gonzalo Peña as Marcelo Herrera Toscano
- Omar Fierro as Ángel "Angelito" González Robledo
- Sara Corrales as Ingrid
- Adrián Di Monte as Roberto "Bobby" Silva Esquivel
- Oka Giner as Marina Salazar Fuentes
- Begoña Narváez as Bere
- Luz María Jerez as Lorena
- Anahí Allué as Alondra
- Itahisa Machado as Telma
- José Manuel Lechuga as Lalo
- Magaly Boyselle as Amalia
- Luis Rodríguez as El Wero
- Carlos Hays as Espárrago
- Patricio José as Julián
- Abril Michelle as Mili
- Aidan Vallejo as Aitor
- María José Mariscal as Laura
- Lara Campos as Natalia "Naty"
- Susana Alexander as Esther
- Édgar Vivar as Homero
- Juan Ferrara as Eduardo

=== Recurring ===
- Alicia Paola as Dora
- Denisha as Yolis
- Martín Navarrete as Aurelio
- Francisco Calvillo as Teo
- Fiona as Barbara
- Sergio Kleiner as Clemente
- Amara Villafuerte as Doctora Rosales
- Francisco Pizaña as Jorge Frutos
- Gema Garoa as Cristina
- Queta Lavat as Romina

== Reception ==
The telenovela premiered with a total of 2.8 million viewers During its first month it aired at 8:30pm CT. Due to low ratings and not turning out to be the success that Televisa expected, on 26 August 2019 the series moved to daytime at 2:30pm CT.

== Episodes ==
No.	Title	Original release date	Mexico viewers (millions)
1	"#LadyApuestas"	29 July 2019 (Note: Premiered early online through Las Estrellas website on 26 July 2019.)	2.8
When her sister Marina announces her engagement, Lucía hears that her mother bets that she will be the only unhappy person at the wedding. Given this, she will accept Maura's challenge, for which she will be known online as Lady Apuestas.
2	"La primera cita"	30 July 2019	2.7
Lucía is invited on a date by a peculiar co-worker. Angelito wants to get close to Lucía, so he asks Salazar to help his daughter visit him. Marcelo proposes to Lucía, along with Eduardo, Lalo and Ingrid, to make a vlog about her life and her blind dates.
3	"Exconvicta"	31 July 2019	2.4
Maura and Alondra are going to jail for fighting. After realizing that Marcelo's intentions are the best, Lucía can't stand her desire and her nervousness leads her to kiss him. Bobby will try to convince Lucía to launch her vlog.
4	"Consuegras"	1 August 2019	2.5
Maura and Lorena try to agree on their children's wedding, but with many difficulties. Lucía puts her own conditions to the executives of Entre Nos, because it will be her who will expose her life in the vlog. Marina asks Lucía to approach Maura again. Lucía's vlog is a success.
5	"El ilusionista"	2 August 2019	2.5
Lucía celebrates in a canteen the beginning of her vlogs and, unexpectedly, Marina, Maura and Alondra will join the celebration. Bobby creates Lucía's profile on a dating app and gets her a date, which unleashes Marcelo's jealousy. Guest star: Claudio Lafarga as El Mago
6	"El verdadero tú"	5 August 2019	2.6
Lorena demands that Lucía end her vlogs because it is affecting Marina and Julián's relationship. Lucía has a disastrous third date. Marcelo knows perfectly what he begins to feel for Lucía, so he has no problem confessing everything. Guest star: Jorge Aravena as Rufino
7	"Casa llena"	6 August 2019	2.5
Angelito and Alondra come to live at Maura's house unleashing chaos in the family. Lucía continues to look for dates within a mobile app, where she finds Alfredo, the same designer friend that Marcelo had presented to her. Guest stars: Gabriel Soto as Alfredo, Faisy as Dosberto
8	"Me gusta, pero me asusta"	7 August 2019	2.2
Lucía's next date will be with Dosberto. Lucia wants to have a date with Alfredo, but she is afraid that he will reject her because he is so handsome. Marcelo hides a secret. Guest stars: Gabriel Soto as Alfredo, Faisy as Dosberto
9	"Tacos de canasta"	8 August 2019	2.3
Lucía and Bere discover that Marcelo has a double life, because he has a wife and a hidden daughter. Maura enters the brink of collapse when she discovers Lorena's new plan for Marina's wedding. Alfredo wants to have a good time and play with Lucía's feelings. Marcelo wants to protect her, but Lucía believes the opposite. Guest star: Gabriel Soto as Alfredo
10	"Doctor Miedo"	9 August 2019	2.5
Salazar gets drunk with mezcal and, along with Angelito, ends up fighting in the ring with old friends. Marcelo confesses to Lucía and Ingrid that he has a daughter. Guest star: Gabriel Soto as Alfredo
11	"Happy Hour"	12 August 2019	2.0
Bobby and Lucía go out to dinner and, as both drink too much, they end up together in bed, which will not make Maura very happy. Marina discovers the deal between Julián and Maura. Marcelo is jealous knowing that Lucía was in bed with Bobby, although he really doesn't know what happened during that night.
12	"El cupcake de las disculpas"	13 August 2019	2.1
With a cupcake, Lucía apologizes to Marcelo for the video that she uploaded to her vlog, but this unleashes Ingrid's jealousy. Bobby will help Lucía to make people forget her latest video, which puts Marina's wedding at risk. Julian asks Lucía to promote his restaurant, after an altercation with a cockroach.
13	"Cornaura"	14 August 2019	2.0
Maura believes that Salazar cheats on her with Alondra, so she explodes with jealousy and makes a scene that takes her to prison. Lucía has a date with Badú, who explains that they are full of hate because they are marginalized.
14	"Cuerdas y flacas"	15 August 2019	2.3
Although Lucía is having a hard time doing her diet, she agrees with Maura to continue it as long as Maura goes to therapy. Marcelo tries to have something with Ingrid, but he can't get Lucía out of his thoughts. While Lucía earns Naty's love and affection.
15	"Terapia regresiva"	16 August 2019	1.9
Maura reveals much of her past with the psychologist. Salazar plans to leave his wife. Lucía fails in her date with Carolo. Guest star: Juan Diego Covarrubias as Carolo
16	"Partida de tenis"	19 August 2019	2.1
Lucía hides Julián under her bed, when Maura and Marina visit her in a surprising way. Naty disappears from the Ingrid's sight, when both visit an amusement park. Maura and Lucía will face each other on the tennis court. Telma could be in trouble. Guest star: Juan Diego Covarrubias as Carolo
17	"Sorpresa"	20 August 2019	2.0
Marcelo finds out what really happened in the amusement park with Naty. And although Lucía was not to blame for anything, it is with her that he unleashes his anger. Marina and Julián disappear, but not before announcing that they have decided to get married in Las Vegas. Telma is pregnant. Guest star: Juan Diego Covarrubias as Carolo
18	"Mugre microbio"	21 August 2019	1.6
During a robbery, Carolo shows Lucía that she is better off alone than in bad company and Maura believes that her daughter was kidnapped. Dr. Patricia tries to conquer Salazar. Despite being upset, Marcelo hears Angelito's call and goes to Lucía's search, having a great result. Guest star: Juan Diego Covarrubias as Carolo
19	"El despido"	22 August 2019	2.0
Lucía and Marcelo reconcile. With the help of her psychologist, Maura takes out all the traumas she had in her childhood and the suffering at her birth. Unexpectedly, Marina shows up at Lucía's house to inform her that there has been no wedding in Las Vegas. Lalo fires El Güero from Entre Nos.
20	"Secretaria particular"	23 August 2019	2.5
El Güero threatens to jump off the building, because he has been left without a job. Maura is so impressed with what happens at Entre Nos, that she decides to work in the company as Lucía's assistant. Angelito confesses to Salazar that his state of health is serious, he could even lose his life soon. Lucía's presentation on television takes place.
21	"#LadyMaura"	26 August 2019	N/A
Maura and Lucía argue on a television show, but when Lucía tries to prove that her mother is the bad one, everyone is in favor of Maura. When going to give comfort to Lucía, Angelito suffers a serious accident.
22	"Para mí, estás muerta"	27 August 2019	N/A
Marina is so hurt by what Lucía did on television that she assures her that she no longer has a sister. Lucía and Marcelo end their discussion with a kiss, but Lucía does not take it in the best way.
23	"Varicela"	28 August 2019	N/A
Naty gets sick and causes chaos due to the risk of infection. Lucía is reunited with a former boyfriend of the school. Angelito asks Alondra for marriage. Marcelo could lose his daughter. Marcelo could lose his daughter. Naty confesses to her mother that she does not want to live with Marcelo, since Ingrid threatens her and does nothing to like her. Maura is transformed from her therapy and makes Julián admit his true vocation.
24	"Tiene algo misterioso"	29 August 2019	N/A
Lucía agrees to go out on a date with Jorge, but what does her old friend hide ?. Maura and Alondra finally make peace. Lucía goes to the nutritionist. Angelito stronger symptoms, but he still doesn't want to tell the truth.
25	"Golpe al saco"	30 August 2019	N/A
Lucía and Marcelo discharge all their energy in the gym, but Bobby will use that union to threaten her. Unexpectedly, Cristina takes Naty, without notifying Marcelo.
26	"Sacudir la polilla"	2 September 2019	N/A
Marcelo puts a stop to Ingrid for her little love for Naty. Bobby blackmails Lucía with revealing everything about her kiss with Marcelo, unless she does everything he asks. Lucía proposes a non-aggressive pact to Maura in their television debate.
27	"Águila vigía"	3 September 2019	N/A
Maura and Alondra go to Guadalajara to spy on Salazar. Marcelo wants to quit Entre Nos and Lucía could be in danger.
28	"El marido del siglo"	4 September 2019	N/A
Salazar discovers Maura's plan to spy on him at the congress. And despite how bad her idea was, Salazar decides to forgive her and go on with their love. Lucía receives a massage from Marcelo.
29	"Fiesta de chicas"	5 September 2019	N/A
Maura and Alondra decide to celebrate love, but when Maura finds out that Alondra will marry Angelito, everything will change. Mili discovers that her mother is pregnant. Marina has doubts about what she feels for Julián, since she has started to go out with César.
30	"GPS"	6 September 2019	N/A
Marcelo is jealous of Lucía and Jorge, but he prepares a surprise for Lucía. Maura reveals to Marina the truth about Julián. Bobby recommends Maura to be distant and upset with Lucía, because this is what attracts attention.
31	"Tres kilos"	9 September 2019	N/A
Lucía is losing weight, but this unleashes problems with Marcelo. Marina breaks up with Julián because he wants to be a tattoo artist. Salazar tells Angelito that he has to reveal to Alondra the seriousness of his state of health.
32	"De grande quiero ser como tú"	10 September 2019	N/A
Marina apologizes to Lucía, after learning about Julián's deception and discovering that she never betrayed her, and proposes to live together. Jorge continues with his plan to destroy Maura through Lucía. Marcelo goes to look for Lucía to try to fix things, but arrives at the least indicated time where his heart breaks.
33	"Los gemelos del terror"	11 September 2019	N/A
Lucía, Marcelo and the Entre Nos team go camping. Lucía and Marcelo suffer in integration dynamics. Marina wants to leave her comfort zone. Frutos suffers the loss of his father, so he swears to avenge him and make Maura and her family suffer.
34	"Este viaje ha sido un desastre"	12 September 2019	N/A
In the integration dynamics, Ingrid is infected with chickenpox. Telma finds out that Bobby had a vasectomy. Marcelo goes into crisis. Eduardo discovers that Telma and Bobby have a relationship beyond friendship.
35	"Agua fría"	13 September 2019	N/A
During the integration dynamics, Lucía is surprised by an unexpected visit, who gives her terrible news. Marcelo presents a crisis of paranoia. Maura seeks to make peace with Marina. Ingrid will do anything to stop the chickenpox discomfort.
36	"Sherlock"	16 September 2019	N/A
The Entre Nos team follows the rules in their next activity and Marcelo will be injured, but first, he will save everyone from being poisoned. Lalo kisses Telma after she confesses her relationship with Bobby. Angelito's disease progresses faster.
37	"Angelito"	17 September 2019	N/A
Angelito's collection manages to be a success in the exhibition, despite the fact that his illness progresses. Lucía finds out about the relationship between Telma and Bobby, who blackmails Lalo when he asks him to quit the company. Lucía's fandom confronts Maura for the way he treats his daughter.
38	"Operación de vida o muerte"	18 September 2019	N/A
Salazar gives the news to Lucía about the difficult surgery Angelito will undergo. Marcelo unleashes Jorge's jealousy. Maura receives another mysterious call, but this time she has a clue.
39	"El centro del mundo"	19 September 2019	N/A
Lucía explodes against Maura for causing a scandal in the hospital. Marcelo wants to resign and asks for support to gain custody of Naty.
40	"Vestida para matar"	20 September 2019	N/A
Lucía decides to take the bull by the horns and do the program with Maura, in addition to having a romantic date with Frutos. Eduardo fires Marcelo, after learning that he would resign from Entre Nos.
41	"Maura no está, Maura se fue"	23 September 2019	N/A
As Lucía breaks up with Frutos, he kidnaps Maura to fulfill his revenge. Salazar, Alondra and Esther come together to look for Maura.
42	"Todo tiene un final"	24 September 2019	N/A
Lucía and her family receive a letter from Maura where she assures them that she has gone far and with a man.
43	"No imagino mi vida sin Marcelo"	25 September 2019	N/A
Lucía, who almost kissed Marcelo, assures Marina that she only wants him as a friend. Maura confesses to Frutos why she accused his father. Angelito proposes marriage to Alondra. Marina decides to end her adventure with César, to be with Julián.
44	"S.O.S. Frutos"	26 September 2019	N/A
Thanks to the letter written by Maura, Lucía and the family discover that Frutos is the author of her abduction. Ingrid tries to seduce Marcelo.
45	"Será una muerte perfecta"	27 September 2019	N/A
Maura asks Frutos for her last breakfast to avoid hurting her and tells him how she suffered as a child because she was fat. Lucía goes on national television to defend her mother.
46	"Al rescate de Maura"	30 September 2019	N/A
The police find the place where Frutos has kidnapped Maura. Frutos asks Lucía to approach him, so she agrees to do so in order to get Maura safe and sound. Angelito decides to escape from the hospital in an ambulance, to go to rescue Lucía.
47	"El camino a la felicidad"	1 October 2019	N/A
Esther's plan is a success and the family manages to rescue Maura. Lucía and Marcelo make love.
48	"La ley del mono"	2 October 2019	N/A
Ingrid won't let Marcelo leave her, so with Bobby's help, they set a trap for Marcelo and Lucía. Maura receives a proposal to make a reality show of her family, including Angelito.
49	"Voto de castidad"	3 October 2019	N/A
As Ingrid is sent to the friend zone by Marcelo, she asks Bobby to avoid having physical contact with anyone. Lucía wants to talk to her family and doesn't want to know anything about Marcelo.
50	"Un futuro mejor"	4 October 2019	N/A
Lucía asks her family not to participate in the reality show, but nobody supports her. Lucía decides to look for a man who makes her happy and quits Entre Nos upon learning that Marcelo returned.
51	"El que quiere acertar, espera"	7 October 2019	N/A
Lucía presents her resignation to Don Eduardo, but he offers her to become a partner in the company so that together they can take Bobby out; Lucia accepts with some conditions. There are 90 days left to finish the bet. Telma confesses to Eduardo that she is pregnant.
52	"Los declaro marido y mujer"	8 October 2019	N/A
Angelito and Alondra finally get married. Marcelo arrives at the wedding and tries to talk to Lucía but she continues to reject him. Marina and Lucía are hysterical because of the 90 days remaining of the bet. The reality show begins. Lucía announces that she will date a math teacher and Marcelo immediately dies of jealousy.
53	"Lucía tiene una nueva cita"	9 October 2019	N/A
Lucía meets Ricardo and their date is broadcast on the reality show, which Marcelo doesn't like very much. Marcelo tells Ingrid that their trip together to Venice is canceled.
54	"El drama de Naty"	10 October 2019	N/A
Naty locks herself in the bathroom knowing that her mother will take her to Canada and her father does not support her. Lucía learns that Bobby sold her privacy and that of her family.
55	"La otra casa"	11 October 2019	N/A
Ingrid and Lucía find each other at the airport to Monterrey. Maura goes with Esther to tell her her future and everyone is tired of the reality show. Lucía accepts Marcelo's proposal so that Cristina doesn't take away Naty.
56	"El vestido amarillo de Naty"	14 October 2019	N/A
The yellow dress that Lucía got for Naty has disappeared. Naty is surprised to receive from the hands of Ingrid the yellow dress she loved so much for her first communion. Although Lucía did everything to recover the yellow dress, it was impossible.
57	"La impactante confesión de Ingrid"	15 October 2019	N/A
Lucía is not allowed to enter Naty's first communion. Mili finds her brother Lalo walking as a homeless person in a park. Marcelo tells Lucía that he loves her, but when she confronts Ingrid about Naty's dress, she discovers a terrible secret.
58	"No comprendo a los hombres"	16 October 2019	N/A
Ingrid asks Lucía not to tell anyone that she is expecting Marcelo's baby, but at the same time she begs her to stay away from him. Lucía is confused by what she feels for Marcelo, even more when she hears him say that he loves her.
59	"Nunca me vas a ver como algo más"	17 October 2019	N/A
Lucía confesses to Marcelo that Ingrid is pregnant with his baby, so she cannot accept to be his girlfriend. Maura believes that she already won the bet with Lucía. Marcelo doesn't think Ingrid is pregnant.
60	"Tristán e Isolda"	18 October 2019	N/A
Lucía accepts Bobby's proposal to pretend to date, just to raise her image. Marcelo confesses to Lucía that he will have the baby with Ingrid. Marina makes a date for Lucía with a handsome guy.
61	"No me arrobes"	21 October 2019	N/A
What seemed like a fun night between Maura and Alondra, became a torment, since the attitude taken by two young girls with Alondra caused a fight, so Maura went to jail. Adrián confesses to Lucía his intentions and his feelings for her. Maura's fans are angry at her behavior at the bar.
62	"Son las Kardashians del canal"	22 October 2019	N/A
While Maura assaults a person again, Lucía seems to put a barrier on her relationship with Adrián.
63	"Sentimientos cósmicos"	23 October 2019	N/A
Bobby visits Lucía and begins to tell her that it is not good to date someone from her work, like she is doing with Adrián; however he tells her this because he starts to feel something for her. Adrián finds a video where Maura doesn't attack anyone in the bar. Ingrid can no longer hide that she is not pregnant. Lalo returns to Entre Nos.
64	"¡Tengo novio!"	24 October 2019	N/A
Adrián asks Lucía to be a formal couple. The mystery of the bar was solved and Maura regains her credibility. Ingrid pays for a fake ultrasound.
65	"Las villanas siempre pierden"	25 October 2019	N/A
Ingrid makes Marcelo believe that they expect twins and decide to move up their wedding. Bobby tired of Ingrid's lies, decides to speak with the truth to Marcelo minutes before getting married, just because of the babies' commitment.
66	"Brindis por el amor"	28 October 2019	N/A
Ingrid and Marcelo did not get married, but they tell people in Entre Nos that there was a wedding. Marcelo and Naty arrive at the park to meet Lucía, but they never imagined that she would be accompanied by Adrián; however, when they approach to greet her, Lucía begins to feel bad and has severe pain in her chest.
67	"Arriésgate a ser feliz"	29 October 2019	N/A
Although Angelito wanted to hide his illness, Alondra finds out, after reading his medical studies. Lucía talking with her dad, is sincere and recognizes that she does not love Adrián, so he advises her to always speak with the truth.
68	"Confía en tu corazón"	30 October 2019	N/A
Angelito thanks the whole family, while Alondra suffers from his illness. Marcelo is armed with courage and calls Lucía to confess his love, but someone else answers the phone.
69	"No me sueltes"	31 October 2019	N/A
Angelito has a conversation with Alondra, but in a moment, his heart stops beating. Eduardo finds out about Bobby's fraud and sells him Entre Nos, so he can get rid of him. Marcelo discovers Ingrid's deception.
70	"Hay cosas que nunca cambian"	1 November 2019	N/A
Angelito leaves a message of love to Lucía and Maura. Bobby fires Ingrid from Entre Nos, but since her deception of Marcelo goes viral, nobody wants to hire her anymore. Lucía breaks up with Adrián and arrives alone at Marina's wedding. Bobby may have become the owner of Entre Nos, but for committing tax fraud, he is going to jail. Although Lucía believed that she had lost the bet, her mother gives her the keys to the house, but not before telling her that true love is to love herself. Finally Marcelo arrives and declares his love to Lucía.

== Awards and nominations ==
Year	Award	Category	Nominated	Result
2020	TVyNovelas Awards	Best Actress	Sofía Garza	Nominated
2020	TVyNovelas Awards	Best Leading Actress	Victoria Ruffo	Nominated
2020	TVyNovelas Awards	Best Co-lead Actor	Omar Fierro	Nominated
2020	TVyNovelas Awards	Best Direction	Juan Carlos Muñoz and Rodrigo Curiel	Nominated
2020	TVyNovelas Awards	Best Direction of the Cameras	Juan Carlos Muñoz and Rodrigo Curiel	Nominated
2020	TVyNovelas Awards	Best Original Story or Adaptation	Andrés Burgos	Nominated
2020	TVyNovelas Awards	Best Musical Theme	"Así como soy" (Sofía Garza and Viviana Barrera)	Nominated
