= Ana Bertha Espín =

Mexican actress (born 1958)

- Born: Ana Bertha Espín Ocampo; 13 October 1958 (age 67); Tehuixtla, Morelos, Mexico
- Occupation: Actress
- Years active: 1981–present
- Spouse: Jaime Lozano Sr. (?-1992)
- Children: Jaime Lozano Jr. (b. 1978)
- Parent(s): Arturo Espín; Altagracia Ocampo de Espín

Ana Bertha Espín Ocampo (born 13 October 1958) is a Mexican actress.

== Filmography ==
Films, Telenovelas, Series
Year	Title	Role	Notes
1981	Soledad	Pilar	Supporting role
1982	Leona Vicario	Adela Camacho	Supporting role
1986-87	Cuna de lobos	Mayra	Supporting role
1987	Pobre señorita Limantour		Supporting role
1987-88	Quinceañera	Estela	
1989	Mi segunda madre	Amelia	Supporting role
1993	Clarisa		Special appearance
1993-94	Más allá del puente	Rosaura Reséndiz	Supporting role
1994	Ya la hicimos		Film
1994	Una buena forma de morir		Film
1995	Embrujo de rock		Film
1995-96	Morelia	Magdalena Ríos vda. de Solórzano	Supporting role
1996	Canción de amor	Juana	Supporting role
1997	Pueblo chico, infierno grande	Rutila Cumbios	Supporting role
1997	Leonela, muriendo de amor	Estela Mirabal de Ferrari	Supporting role
1997	Por si no te vuelvo a ver	Nominated – Ariel Award for Best Actress in a Minor Role	Film
1997	Rastros		Film
1998	Embrujo de rock		TV movie
1998	Luces de la noche		Film
1999	Santitos	Soledad	Film
1999-00	María Emilia, querida	Yolanda González de Aguirre	Supporting role
1999-00	Tres mujeres	Lucía Sánchez	Supporting role
2000	Su alteza serenísima		Film
2001	Sin pecado concebido	Flor Gutiérrez de Martorel	Supporting role
2003	Amor Real	Prudencia Curiel vda. de Alonso	Supporting role
2004	Rubí	Elisa de Duarte/de de La Fuente	Supporting role
2005–present	Vecinos	Lorena Ruiz	Main cast
2006-07	Código Postal	Jessica Mendoza de González de la Vega	Main cast
2007	Recuérdame	Alicia Darien Vda. de Irazaga	Supporting role
2008	Las Tontas No Van al Cielo	Gregoria "Goya" Alcalde vda. de Morales	Main cast
2009	Locas de amor	Olga	TV series
2009-10	Camaleones	Guadalupe "Lupita" Ramírez vda. de Morán	Supporting role
2010	Soy tu dueña	Enriqueta Bermúdez de Macotela	Supporting role
2010	Mujeres Asesinas 3	Thelma Azuara Martinez	Episode: "Thelma, impaciente"
2011-12	La que no podía amar	Rosaura Flores Nava	Main cast
2013-14	Lo que la vida me robó	Rosario Domínguez	Co-Protagonist
2015	Que te perdone Dios	Constanza del Angel vda. de Flores	Supporting role
2016	Tres veces Ana	Remedios García	Supporting role
2019	La usurpadora	Arcadia Rivas de Miranda	Main cast
2021	Te acuerdas de mí	Delia Castro	Supporting role
2021	Mi fortuna es amarte	Teresa García Jiménez	Supporting role
2023	Eternamente amándonos	Irma Ruvalcaba	Main cast
2023	Golpe de suerte	Dora Viuda de Flores	Main cast
2026	Mi rival	Consuelo	Main cast

== Awards and nominations ==
Year	Award	Category	Telenovela	Result
2004	TVyNovelas Awards	Best Co-star Actress	Amor Real	Won
2007	TVyNovelas Awards	Best Comedic Performance	Vecinos	Nominated
2009	TVyNovelas Awards	Best First Actress	Las Tontas No Van al Cielo	Nominated
2012	TVyNovelas Awards	Best First Actress	La que no podía amar	Nominated
2012	Premios People en Español	Best Villain	La que no podía amar	Nominated
