= TVyNovelas Award for Best Actress =

Mexican television award

- Awarded for: Best performance by an actress in a protagonic role
- First award: 1983; Silvia Pinal; Mañana es primavera
- Currently held by: 2020; Sandra Echeverría; La usurpadora

== Winners and nominees ==
=== 1980s ===
Winner	Nominated
1st TVyNovelas Awards
Silvia Pinal for Mañana es primavera	Ana Martín for Gabriel y Gabriela; Christian Bach for El amor nunca muere
2nd TVyNovelas Awards
Christian Bach for Bodas de odio	Irma Lozano for Amor ajeno; Jacqueline Andere for El maleficio
3rd TVyNovelas Awards
Susana Alexander for La traición	Ana Martín for La pasión de Isabela; Helena Rojo for La traición
4th TVyNovelas Awards
Angélica Aragón for Vivir un poco	Christian Bach for De pura sangre; Erika Buenfil for Angélica; Lucía Méndez for Tú o nadie
5th TVyNovelas Awards
Diana Bracho for Cuna de lobos	Daniela Romo for El camino secreto; Edith González for Monte calvario; Norma Herrera for Cicatrices del alma; Ofelia Medina for La gloria y el infierno
6th TVyNovelas Awards
Verónica Castro for Rosa salvaje	Julieta Rosen for Senda de gloria; Victoria Ruffo for Victoria
7th TVyNovelas Awards
Christian Bach for Encadenados	Ana Martin for El pecado de Oyuki; Lucía Méndez for El extraño retorno de Diana Salazar

=== 1990s ===
Winner	Nominated
8th TVyNovelas Awards
María Sorté for Mi segunda madre	Angélica Aragón for La casa al final de la calle; Victoria Ruffo for Simplemente María
9th TVyNovelas Awards
Verónica Castro for Mi pequeña Soledad	Angélica Aragón for Días sin luna; Daniela Romo for Balada por un amor; Jacqueline Andere for Ángeles blancos; Leticia Calderón for Yo compro esa mujer
10th TVyNovelas Awards
Diana Bracho for Cadenas de amargura	Erika Buenfil for Vida robada; Lucía Méndez for Amor de nadie
11th TVyNovelas Awards
María Sorté for De frente al sol	Thalía forMaría Mercedes; Leticia Calderón for Valeria y Maximiliano
12th TVyNovelas Awards
Edith González for Corazón salvaje	Leticia Calderon for Entre la vida y la muerte; Victoria Ruffo for Capricho
13th TVyNovelas Awards
Rebecca Jones for Imperio de cristal	Angélica María for Agujetas de color de rosa; Thalía for Marimar
14th TVyNovelas Awards
Lucero for Lazos de amor	Angélica Rivera for La dueña; Helena Rojo for Retrato de familia
15th TVyNovelas Awards
Daniela Castro for Cañaveral de pasiones	Erika Buenfil for Marisol; Leticia Calderón for La antorcha encendida; Maribel Guardia for Tú y yo
16th TVyNovelas Awards
Angélica Aragón for Mirada de mujer	Claudia Ramírez for Te sigo amando; Leticia Calderón for Esmeralda
17th TVyNovelas Awards
Helena Rojo for El privilegio de amar	Gabriela Spanic for La usurpadora; Victoria Ruffo for Vivo por Elena

=== 2000s ===
Winner	Nominated
18th TVyNovelas Awards
Leticia Calderón for Laberintos de pasión	Edith González for Nunca te olvidaré; Erika Buenfil for Tres mujeres
19th TVyNovelas Awards
Lucero for Mi destino eres tú	Anahí for Primer amor, a mil por hora; Aracely Arámbula for Abrázame muy fuerte
20th TVyNovelas Awards
Adela Noriega for El manantial	Angélica Rivera for Sin pecado concebido; Edith González for Salomé
21st TVyNovelas Awards
Yadhira Carrillo for La otra	Aracely Arámbula for Las vías del amor; Karyme Lozano for Niña amada mía
22nd TVyNovelas Awards
Adela Noriega for Amor real	Susana González for Velo de novia; Yadhira Carrillo for Amarte es mi pecado
23rd TVyNovelas Awards
Bárbara Mori for Rubí	Edith González for Mujer de madera; Patricia Manterola for Apuesta por un amor
24th TVyNovelas Awards
Lucero for Alborada	Adela Noriega for La esposa virgen; Ninel Conde for Rebelde; Victoria Ruffo for La madrastra
25th TVyNovelas Awards
Angélica Vale for La fea más bella	Alejandra Barros for La verdad oculta; Ana Layevska for Las dos caras de Ana; Jacqueline Bracamontes for Heridas de amor; Karyme Lozano for Amar sin límites
26th TVyNovelas Awards
Angélica Rivera for Destilando amor	Mayrín Villanueva for Yo amo a Juan Querendón; Susana González for Pasión
27th TVyNovelas Awards
Blanca Guerra for Alma de hierro	Adela Noriega for Fuego en la sangre; Jacqueline Bracamontes for Las tontas no van al cielo

=== 2010s ===
Winner	Nominated
28th TVyNovelas Awards
Itatí Cantoral for Hasta que el dinero nos separe	Aracely Arámbula for Corazón salvaje; Jacqueline Bracamontes for Sortilegio; Lucero for Mañana es para siempre
29th TVyNovelas Awards
Angelique Boyer for Teresa	Ariadne Díaz for Llena de amor; Lucero for Soy tu dueña; Rebecca Jones for Para volver a amar
30th TVyNovelas Awards
Sandra Echeverría for La fuerza del destino	Ana Brenda Contreras for La que no podía amar; Maite Perroni for Triunfo del amor; Anahí for Dos hogares; Mayrín Villanueva for Una familia con suerte
31st TVyNovelas Awards
Victoria Ruffo for Corona de lágrimas	Angelique Boyer for Abismo de pasión; Lucero for Por ella soy Eva; Zuria Vega for Un refugio para el amor
32nd TVyNovelas Awards
Erika Buenfil for Amores verdaderos	Ana Brenda Contreras for Corazón indomable; Blanca Soto for Porque el amor manda; Mayrin Villanueva for Mentir para vivir
33rd TVyNovelas Awards
Adriana Louvier for Yo no creo en los hombres	Angelique Boyer for Lo que la vida me robó; Ariadne Díaz for La malquerida; Esmeralda Pimentel for El color de la pasión; Maite Perroni for La gata; Zuria Vega for Qué pobres tan ricos
34th TVyNovelas Awards
Maite Perroni for Antes muerta que Lichita	Esmeralda Pimentel for La vecina; Livia Brito for Muchacha italiana viene a casarse; Michelle Renaud for La sombra del pasado; Zuria Vega for Que te perdone Dios
35th TVyNovelas Awards
Angelique Boyer for Tres veces Ana	Adriana Louvier for Sin rastro de ti; Claudia Álvarez for Simplemente María; Irene Azuela for El hotel de los secretos; Silvia Navarro for La candidata
36th TVyNovelas Awards
Maite Perroni for Papá a toda madre	Adriana Louvier for Caer en tentación; Ariadne Díaz for La doble vida de Estela Carrillo; Silvia Navarro for Caer en tentación; Zuria Vega for Mi marido tiene familia
37th TVyNovelas Awards
Angelique Boyer for Amar a muerte	Michelle Renaud for Hijas de la luna; Livia Brito for La Piloto; Susana González for Mi marido tiene familia; Zuria Vega for Mi marido tiene familia

=== 2020s ===
Winner	Nominated
38th TVyNovelas Awards
Sandra Echeverría for La usurpadora	Mariana Torres for Ringo; Michelle Renaud for La reina soy yo; Paulina Goto for Vencer el miedo; Sofía Garza for Cita a ciegas; Vanessa Guzmán for Soltero con hijas

== Records ==
- Most awarded actress: Lucero and Angelique Boyer, 3 times.
- Most nominated actress: Leticia Calderón, Victoria Ruffo and Lucero with 6 nominations.
- Youngest winner: Angelique Boyer, 22 years old.
- Youngest nominee: Anahí, 18 years old.
- Oldest winner: Blanca Guerra, 56 years old.
- Oldest nominees: Jacqueline Andere, Victoria Ruffo and Rebecca Jones, 54 years old.
- Actresses with the most nominations without a win: Zuria Vega with 5 nominations.
- Actress winning after short time:
  - Adela Noriega by (El manantial, 2002) and (Amor Real, 2004), 2 years difference.
  - Maite Perroni by (Antes muerta que Lichita, 2016) and (Papá a toda madre, 2018), 2 years difference.
  - Angelique Boyer by (Tres veces Ana, 2017) and (Amar a muerte, 2019), 2 years difference.
- Actress winning after long time: Angélica Aragón by (Vivir un poco, 1986) and (Mirada de mujer, 1998), 12 years difference.
- Actresses that winning the award for the same role:
  - Christian Bach (Bodas de odio, 1983) and Adela Noriega (Amor Real, 2003)
  - Lucero (Lazos de Amor, 1995) and Angelique Boyer (Tres veces Ana, 2016)
- Actresses nominated for the same role without winning:
  - Lucía Méndez (Tú o nadie, 1985) and Jacqueline Bracamontes (Sortilegio, 2009).
  - Edith González (Monte calvario, 1986), Claudia Ramírez (Te sigo amando, 1996) and Ana Brenda Contreras (La que no podía amar, 2011).
  - Victoria Ruffo (Victoria, 1987) and Livia Brito (Muchacha italiana viene a casarse, 2014).
  - Leticia Calderón (Yo compro esa mujer, 1990) and Aracely Arámbula (Corazón Salvaje, 2010).
  - Leticia Calderón (Valeria y Maximiliano, 1991) and Jacqueline Bracamontes (Heridas de Amor, 2005).
  - Thalía (Marimar, 1994) and Ana Brenda Contreras (Corazón indomable, 2013).
  - Angélica Rivera (La dueña, 1995) and Lucero (Soy tu dueña, 2010).
  - Aracely Arámbula (Abrázame muy fuerte, 2000) and Zuria Vega (Que te perdone Dios, 2015).
  - Victoria Ruffo (Simplemente María, 1989) and Claudia Álvarez (Simplemente María, 2016).
- Actresses winning this category, despite having been as a main villain: Susana Alexander (La traición, 1985), Diana Bracho (Cadenas de amargura, 1991), Barbara Mori (Rubí, 2004) and Angelique Boyer (Teresa, 2010)
- Actress was nominated in this category, despite having played as a main villain: Lucero (Mañana es para siempre, 2010)
- Foreign winning actresses:
  - Christian Bach from Argentina
  - Bárbara Mori from Uruguay
  - Angelique Boyer from France
