= Adela Adamova =

Argentine ballet dancer (born 1927)

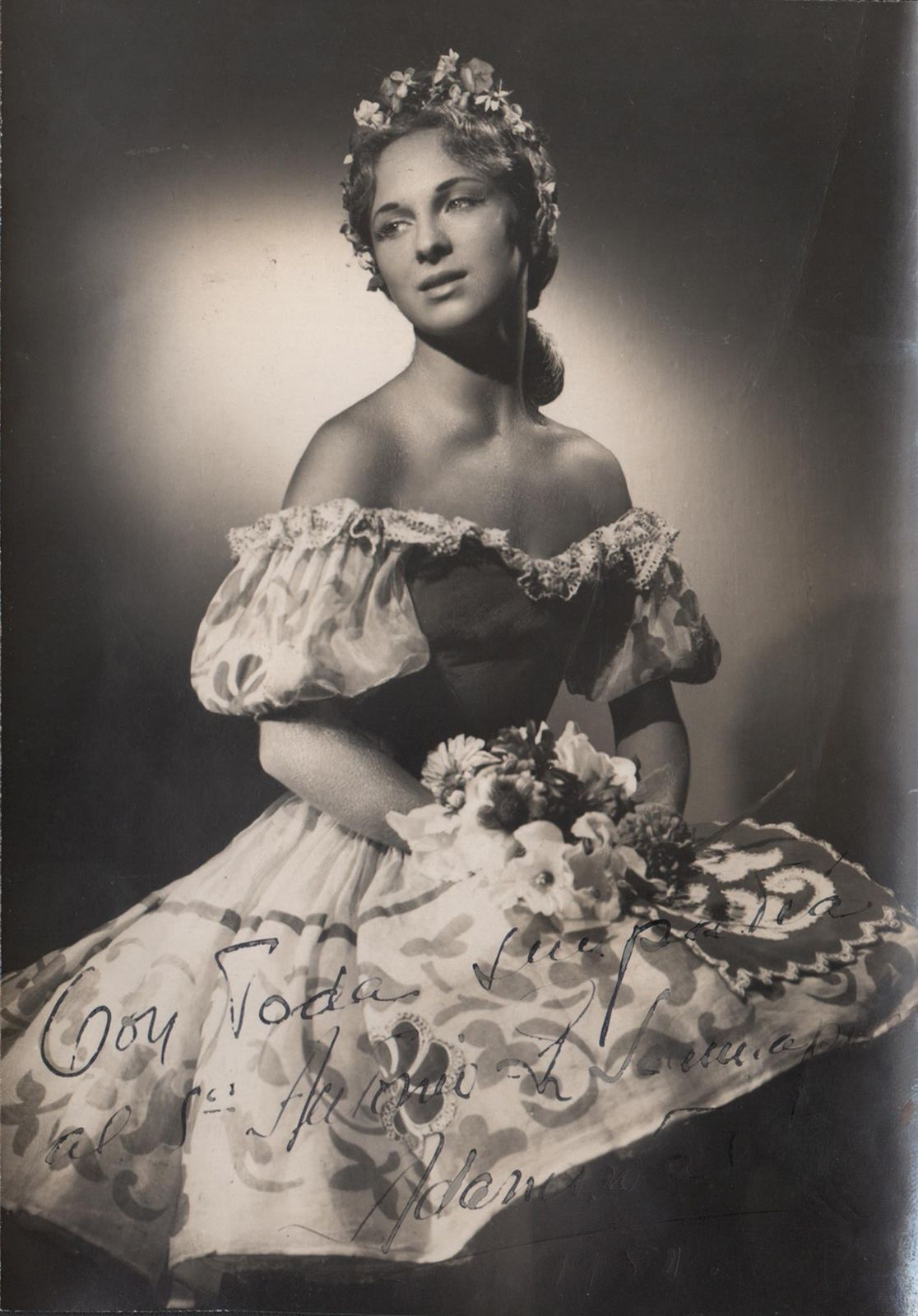
- Adela Adamova in about 1951
- Born: Adela Bottino; 1927 (age 98–99); Turin, Piedmont, Italy
- Occupations: Ballerina, actress, singer
- Children: Christian Bach

Adela Bottino (born 1927), known professionally as Adela Adamova, is an Italian-born Argentine ballet dancer, actress and singer who was the prima ballerina at the Teatro Colón in Buenos Aires.

== Early life ==
Adela Bottino was born in 1927 in Turin to Armando Bottino and Friné Adamova. She was at first educated by her parents, before being taught by Michel Borovski. She opted to use her mother's Russian surname professionally as at the time the Russians were considered to be the best dancers.

== Career ==
In 1942, she left Italy to join the Teatro Colón in Buenos Aires, and at first worked there as an extra. She was promoted to soloist there five years later in 1947 and then again to prima ballerina the following year. Adamova was also engaged at the Paris Opera, which allowed her to tour Europe.

Upon the recommendation of choreographer Aurel Milloss, Adamova and fellow ballet dancer Victor Ferrari were hired by the La Scala opera house in Milan in 1950. Adamova and Ferrari collaborated again in 1951 at the Teatro Colón in Hamlet where they played Ophelia and Hamlet respectively. Two years later, they performed together again in Paris in Coppélia.

In November 1966, she performed in a Channel 9 television special as Lily, supported by a corps de ballet and a children's ballet.

Among her other ballet roles were Les Patineurs, Apollo, The Sleeping Beauty, The Nutcracker. Adamova also recorded songs in English, Italian, Portuguese and Spanish.

== Personal life ==
Adamova was eventually naturalised as an Argentine citizen. Her daughter, Christian Bach, was also an actress.
