= Guillermo Zarur =

Guillermo Zarur (July 20, 1932 – August 8, 2011) was a Mexican television actor. His career lasted for more than 54 years, with credits including telenovelas.

Zarur's numerous telenovela credits included Tú o nadie in 1985, Sortilegio in 2009 and Teresa in 2010.

Zarur was born in Cosolapa, Oaxaca, Mexico, on July 20, 1932. In 2011, Zarur was honored by adding his hand prints to the Paseo de las Luminarias at the Plaza de las Estrellas in Mexico City. He died of heart and kidney failure just three months later on August 8, 2011, at the age of 79.

== Filmography ==
| Year | Title | Role | Notes |
|---|---|---|---|
| 1985 | Tú o nadie | Ramón | 55 episodes |
| 2009 | Sortilegio | Ezequiel Flores | 95 episodes |
| 2010-2011 | Teresa | Don Porfirio Valverde | 40 episodes, (final appearance) |
