= Rebecca de Alba =

Mexican model and TV presenter (born 1964)

- Born: October 26, 1964 (age 61); Zacatecas, Zacatecas, Mexico
- Occupations: Model and TV presenter
- Spouse: Michael Bednarsky (m. 2019)
- Partner: Ricky Martin (1994–2005)

Rebecca de Alba (born October 26, 1964) is a Mexican model and TV presenter.

She studied journalism in Colorado before returning to Mexico where she participated in the Miss Mexico pageant, obtaining second place. She later worked on several television shows, eventually starting her own talk-show in 1993 named Un Nuevo Día with co-host César Costa.

She also worked as a model, becoming the spokesperson for Avon, as well as the first Mexican representative of Bulgari.

She is an actress and producer, known for Sexo y otros secretos (2007), Las niñas bien (2018) and Speed of Glory (2010).

Rebecca de Alba is the host of Project Runway Latin America. She is also the host of MasterChef Celebrity, a Mexican television show featuring Mexico's top amateur chefs.

== See also ==
- List of television presenters from Mexico
