= Esperándote (TV series) =

Mexican telenovela

- Genre: Telenovela; Drama
- Created by: María Antonieta Saavedra
- Directed by: Miguel Córcega
- Starring: Rebeca Rambal; José Elías Moreno; Nayelli Saldívar; Jaime Lozano; Salvador Sánchez; Diana Bracho
- Opening theme: Instrumental by Amparo Rubín
- Country of origin: Mexico
- Original language: Spanish
- No. of episodes: 160

Production
- Executive producer: Eugenio Cobo
- Production locations: Taxco, Mexico
- Cinematography: Manuel Ruiz Esparza
- Production company: Televisa

Original release
- Network: Canal de las Estrellas
- Release: October 7, 1985 – May 16, 1986

Related
- Los años felices; Ave Fénix

Esperándote (English title: Waiting for you) is a Mexican telenovela produced by Eugenio Cobo for Televisa in 1985.

Rebeca Rambal and José Elías Moreno starred as protagonists, while Nayelli Saldívar starred as child protagonist.

== Plot ==
Margarita and Pablo are a young couple living on a farm on the outskirts of Taxco. Their marriage is in a crisis, because both want a child but Margarita cannot have children. As the crisis is leading them to the brink of a divorce, they decide to adopt a child, María Inés.

Guansita, as she is fondly called, is a sweet, tender, and intelligent orphan girl who can finally feel the joy of knowing what a real home is. However, Margarita at first is scorn because she is not their biological daughter. Still, Gusanita the love of Pablo and everyone wins at the farm, as Celso and Juancho pawns.

With great enthusiasm is dedicated to help in any way i can, and start attending school, and Margarita will go realizing how much better the girl and the daughter who always waited, and grow to love as their own.

== Cast ==
- Rebeca Rambal as Margarita Moreno
- José Elías Moreno as Pablo Moreno
- Nayelli Saldívar as María Inés Moreno "Gusanito"/María Inés Noriega
- Jaime Lozano as Celso
- Salvador Sánchez as Juancho
- Diana Bracho as Isabel
- Antonio Medellín as Federico Noriega
- Patricia Reyes Spíndola as Refugio
- Elizabeth Duperón as Irene
- Alonso Echánove as Eduardo
- Lucero Lander as Martha
- Gibránn as Francisco
- Patricia Panini as Ángela
- Carmen Rodríguez as Adriana
- Mariana Gajá as Anita
- César Adrián Sánchez as Alfonsito
- Lili Inclán as Anciana
- Enrique Gilabert as Father Simón
- Ligia Escalante as Sra. Miranda
- Laura Morty as Sra. Martínez
- Eduardo Castell as Sacristán
- Eugenio Cobo as Dr. Millán
- Humberto Vélez as Sr. Martínez

== Soundtrack ==
Side A

1. Gusanito
2. Margarita
3. Isabel
4. Gusanito alegre
5. Pablo
6. Martha bossa nova
7. Refugio
8. Eduardo
9. Gusanito piano

Side B

1. Isabel lánguida
2. Irene
3. Isabel romántica
4. Gusanito triste
5. Margarita bossa nova
6. Federico
7. Margarita triste
8. Juancho

== Awards ==
Year	Award	Category	Nominee	Result
1986	4th TVyNovelas Awards	Best Telenovela of the Year	Eugenio Cobo	Nominated
1986	4th TVyNovelas Awards	Best Child Performance	Nayelli Saldívar	Won
1986	4th TVyNovelas Awards	Best Direction	Miguel Córcega	Nominated
