= Ofelia Cano =

Mexican actress

- Born: Ofelia Gamboa Noriega; 16 May 1959 (age 67); San Ignacio, Sinaloa, Mexico
- Occupation: Actress
- Spouse: José Octavio Cano
- Children: Mónica, Gabriela and José Octavio

Ofelia Cano is a Mexican actress. She appeared in many telenovelas. Some of her better known roles are the one of Rebeca in Entre el amor y el odio and Yolanda in Acorralada.

In 1969 she founded the Instituto de Desarrollo Artistico (The Artistic Development Institute) in Mexico.

== Filmography ==
Year	Title	Role	Notes
1983–1984	Bodas de odio	Nadia Chavarri de Torres Quintero	TV series
1984–1985	La traición	Gilda	TV series
1985–1986	De pura sangre	Carmelita	TV series
1986	Seducción	Gabriela	TV series
1987	Pobre señorita Limantour	Regina Limantour Cevallos	TV series
1996	Confidente de secundaria	Adriana	TV series
2001	Locura de amor	Sofía	TV series
2001	El juego de la vida	Eugenia Robles	TV series
2002	La otra	Diana Herrera	TV series
2002	Entre el amor y el odio	Rebeca Ortiz	TV series
2004	Rubi	Victoria Gallegos	TV series
2007	Acorralada	Yolanda Alarcón	TV series
2009	Mañana es para siempre	Dolores de Astorga	TV series
2008–2020	La rosa de Guadalupe	Various roles	TV series
