= Tú o nadie =

Mexican telenovela

- Genre: Telenovela
- Created by: María Zarattini
- Written by: María Zarattini
- Directed by: José Rendón
- Starring: Lucía Méndez; Andrés García; Salvador Pineda; Úrsula Prats; Luz María Jerez; Magda Guzmán
- Theme music composer: Honorio Herrero
- Opening theme: Corazón de Piedra by Lucía Méndez
- Ending theme: Don Corazón by Lucía Méndez
- Country of origin: Mexico
- Original language: Spanish
- No. of episodes: 120 (60 1-hour episodes)

Production
- Executive producer: Ernesto Alonso
- Cinematography: Carlos Sánchez Zúñiga
- Running time: 21-22 minutes
- Production company: Televisa

Original release
- Network: El Canal de las Estrellas
- Release: February 11 – July 29, 1985

Related
- Acapulco, cuerpo y alma Sortilegio; Cabo

Tú o nadie (English: No One But You) is a Mexican telenovela directed by José Rendón and produced by Ernesto Alonso for Televisa and broadcast by El Canal de las Estrellas in 1985. It became a major international hit, and is considered one of the most successful telenovelas from the 1980s.

Lucía Méndez and Andrés García starred as protagonists, while Salvador Pineda and Úrsula Prats starred as main antagonists.

== Plot ==
Max and Antonio are stepbrothers. Max loathes his stepbrother Antonio because his father, the husband of Max's mother Victoria, left all his fortune and the business to his son Antonio. Max hatches a plan to take all of Antonio's money by marrying Raquel, a girl of humble origins that lives in the city of Guadalajara with her sister & father. Max marries Raquel under the name of Antonio and on their wedding night he is called away. Max leaves Raquel informing her that he has to go away on business. Max returns home to see his brother Antonio off on a business trip. The plane that Antonio boards was sabotaged by Max and when the plane goes down it is presumed that Antonio perished. Max plants the marriage license in Antonio's room, and their mother contacts Raquel informing her of Antonio's death and that she should come right away to the funeral.

When Raquel arrives at the mansion she is in disbelief that Antonio lived there since she thought she had married a middle-class man. During her stay Max presents himself to her she is stunned but he explains to her that he had to create this whole story to regain what was rightfully his and paints Antonio as a despicable man. At first Raquel figures out that Max had his brother killed but Max convinces her otherwise that he did not do it, it was just luck. Max tries to have her go along with the story. But Raquel being of good will and not wanting to be a delinquent rebukes his plan. Max tells her they only have to live out the lie until things calm down then he will marry her to then in turn have access to the fortune. Raquel declines to go along with the ruse at first, but is then blackmailed since Max knows that Raquel's father is into some shady business and if she does not go along with his plan he will send her dad and sister to jail and blame the death of Antonio on her.

As days go by she comes to realize what an evil person Max is and no longer loves him. Antonio then resurfaces alive. When he is told that he will go home to his wife Antonio is a bit perplexed as he is pretty sure he would remember a wife however, doctors have convinced him that he has amnesia. Antonio remains still unsettled. When Raquel and the real Antonio first see each other they are a bit surprised but yet enthralled. Eventually with time they began to fall for each other, to Max's dismay since he actually loves Raquel.

Antonio's former lover Maura teams up with his sister setting a plot against Raquel by bringing a fictive secret lover to the later whose repetitive calls start to unsettle Antonio. Antonio and Raquel's love holds on despite the challenges. A second assassination attempt is mounted by Max and his aid Luis yet again fails at killing Antonio. the latter recovers at Maura's place before leaving to seek personal revenge against his stepbrother. The 2 ultimately confront with guns in the final episode and Antonio kills Max in self defense. Raquel who is few months pregnant is shattered and decides to leave. After her daughter's birth she gets a visit by Victoria Maximiliano's mother who asks her to give Antonio another chance. Antonio, Raquel and their daughter ultimately reunite.

== Cast ==
- Lucía Méndez as Raquel Samaniego Silva de Lombardo
- Andrés García as Antonio Lombardo
- Salvador Pineda as Maximiliano "Max" Albéniz
- Luz María Jerez as Martha Samaniego Silva
- Magda Guzmán as Victoria Vda. de Lombardo/de Albéniz
- Úrsula Prats as Maura Valtierra Cortázar/Laura Zavala Cortés
- Liliana Abud as Camila Lombardo
- Miguel Manzano as Daniel Samaniego Silva
- Arsenio Campos as Claudio
- Miguel Ángel Negrete as Pablo Martínez
- Fabio Ramirez as Oscar
- Guillermo Zarur as Ramòn
- Tony Bravo as Luis Trejo/Hurjencio Castro
- Roberto Antunez as Chucho Gavira
- Marcela de Galina (Maria Marcela) as Carla
- Antonio Valencia as Rodrigo Tornel
- Gaston Tuset as Andrés
- Paola Morelli as Alejandra
- Fernando Sáenz as "El Gato"/Roberto Aguirre
- Julieta Egurrola as Mercedes "Meche" Fernández
- Abraham Méndez as Gabriel Fernández
- Luis Xavier as Humberto
- Jacaranda Alfaro as Pamela Martínez
- Rebeca Silva as Julia
- Alejandro Ruiz as Felipe Acuña
- María Regina as Lissette
- Cecilia Gabriela as María José peasant in the island

== Awards ==
Year	Award	Category	Nominee	Result
1986	4th TVyNovelas Awards	Best Telenovela of the Year	Ernesto Alonso	Nominated
1986	4th TVyNovelas Awards	Best Actress	Lucía Méndez	Nominated
1986	4th TVyNovelas Awards	Best Actor	Andrés García	Nominated
1986	4th TVyNovelas Awards	Best Antagonist Actress	Úrsula Prats	Nominated
1986	4th TVyNovelas Awards	Best Antagonist Actor	Salvador Pineda	Nominated
1986	4th TVyNovelas Awards	Best Leading Actress	Magda Guzmán	Won
1986	4th TVyNovelas Awards	Best Leading Actor	Miguel Manzano	Nominated
1986	4th TVyNovelas Awards	Best Young Lead Actress	Luz María Jerez	Won
1986	4th TVyNovelas Awards	Best Young Lead Actress	Liliana Abud	Nominated
1986	4th TVyNovelas Awards	Best Male Revelation	Luis Xavier	Nominated
1986	4th TVyNovelas Awards	Best Direction	José Rendón	Won
1986	4th TVyNovelas Awards	Best Original Story or Adaptation	María Zarattini	Nominated
1986	4th TVyNovelas Awards	Best Female Debut	Paola Moreli	Nominated
