= TVyNovelas Award for Best Original Story or Adaptation =

Mexican television award

- Awarded for: Best writing for telenovela
- First award: 1986; María Zarattini; De pura sangre
- Currently held by: 2020; Larissa Andrade, Tania Tinajero, Zaria Abreu, and Fernando Abrego; La usurpadora

== Winners and nominees ==
=== 1980s ===
Winner	Nominated
4th TVyNovelas Awards
María Zarattini for De pura sangre	María Zarattini for Tú o nadie; Marissa Garrido for Angélica; Paulinho de Oliveira for Vivir un poco; Ricardo Rentería for Juana Iris
5th TVyNovelas Awards
Carlos Olmos for Cuna de Lobos	Antonio Monsell for La gloria y el infierno; José Rendón and Emilio Larrosa for El camino secreto; Liliana Abud for Cicatrices del alma
6th TVyNovelas Awards
René Muñoz for Quinceañera	
7th TVyNovelas Awards
Liliana Abud and Eric Vonn for Amor en silencio	

=== 1990s ===
Winner	Nominated
8th TVyNovelas Awards
	Eric Vonn for Mi segunda madre
9th TVyNovelas Awards
	María Zarattini for Destino
10th TVyNovelas Awards
	Florinda Meza for Milagro y magia
11th TVyNovelas Awards
	René Muñoz for De frente al sol
~~1994~~
13th TVyNovelas Awards
	Enrique Krause and Fausto Cerón-Medina for El vuelo del águila
14th TVyNovelas Awards
	Yolanda Vargas Dulché for Alondra
15th TVyNovelas Awards
	Cuauhtémoc Blanco and María del Carmen Peña for Cañaveral de pasiones
16th TVyNovelas Awards
	Javier Ruán for Pueblo chico, infierno grande
17th TVyNovelas Awards
	Nora Alemán for La mentira

=== 2000s ===
Winner	Nominated
18th TVyNovelas Awards
Cuauhtémoc Blanco and María del Carmen Peña for Laberintos de pasión	
19th TVyNovelas Awards
Liliana Abud for Abrázame muy fuerte	
~~2002 and 2003~~
22nd TVyNovelas Awards
María Zarattini for Amor real	
~~2005 to 2007~~
26th TVyNovelas Awards
Fernando Gaitan and Kary Fajer for Destilando amor	Gabriela Ortigoza, Antonio Abascal and Miguel Vallejo for Yo amo a Juan Querendón; María Zarattini for Pasión
27th TVyNovelas Awards
Adrián Suar, Ximena Suárez and Aida Guajardo for Alma de Hierro	Delia Fiallo, Carlos Romero and Tere Medina for Cuidado con el ángel; Liliana Abud and Ricardo Fiallega for Fuego en la sangre

=== 2010s ===
Winner	Nominated
28th TVyNovelas Awards
Cuauhtémoc Blanco, María del Carmen Peña and Víctor Manuel Medina for Mi Pecado	Cristina García and Martha Carrillo for En nombre del amor; Fernando Gaitán and Emilio Larrosa for Hasta que el dinero nos separe
~~2011~~
30th TVyNovelas Awards
María Zarattini and Claudia Velasco for La fuerza del destino	Emilio Larrosa, Ricardo Barona and Saúl Pérez Santana for Dos hogares; Liliana Abud and Ricardo Fiallega for Triunfo del amor; Ximena Suárez, Julián Aguilar and Janely E. Lee for La que no podía amar
31st TVyNovelas Awards
Martha Carrillo, Cristina García and Denisse Phiffer for Amor bravío	Juan Carlos Alcalá, Rosa Salazar and Fermín Zúñiga for Abismo de pasión; Pedro Rodríguez, Alejandra Romero and Humberto Robles for Por ella soy Eva
32nd TVyNovelas Awards
Kary Fajer, Gerardo Luna and Ximena Suárez for Amores verdaderos	María Zarattini and Claudia Velazco for Mentir para vivir; Carlos Romero and Tere Medina for Corazón indomable
33rd TVyNovelas Awards
Juan Carlos Alcalá, Rosa Salazar and Fermin Zúñiga for Lo que la vida me robó	José Cuauhtémoc Blanco and María del Carmen Peña for El color de la pasión; Alejandro Pohlenz, Marcia del Río and Ricardo Tejeda for Mi corazón es tuyo; Aída Guajardo and Felipe Ortíz for Yo no creo en los hombres
34th TVyNovelas Awards
Martha Carrillo and Cristina García for A que no me dejas	Pedro Armando Rodríguez, Alejandra Romero Meza, Humberto Robles and Héctor Valdés for Antes muerta que Lichita; Antonio Abascal for La sombra del pasado; Edwin Valencia, Lucero Suárez, Carmen Sepúlveda and Luis Reynoso for La vecina; María Eugenia Cervantes, Luis Mariani, Mario Iván Sánchez, Mariana Palos and Rocío Lara for Muchacha italiana viene a casarse
35th TVyNovelas Awards
Leonardo Bechini for La candidata	María Renée Prudencio for El hotel de los secretos; Carlos Quintanilla and Adriana Pelusi for Sin rastro de ti; María Antonieta Gutiérrez for Un camino hacia el destino; Janely Lee for Vino el amor
36th TVyNovelas Awards
Leonardo Bechini for Caer en tentación	Lucero Suárez, Carmen Sepúlveda, Edwin Valencia, and Luis Reynoso for Enamorándome de Ramón; Claudia Velazco and Pedro Armando Rodríguez for La doble vida de Estela Carrillo; Juan Carlos Alcalá, Rosa Salazar, and Fermín Zuñiga for Me declaro culpable; Héctor Forero, Pablo Ferrer, and Martha Jurado for Mi marido tiene familia
37th TVyNovelas Awards
Leonardo Padrón for Amar a muerte	Alejandro Pohlenz and Palmira Olguín for Hijas de la luna; María Balmori for Like; Pablo Ferrer, Santiago Pineda, and Martha Jurado for Mi marido tiene familia; Mónica Agudelo, José Alberto Castro, Vanesa Varela, and Fernando Garcilita for Por amar sin ley

=== 2020s ===
Winner	Nominated
38th TVyNovelas Awards
Larissa Andrade, Tania Tinajero, Zaria Abreu, and Fernando Abrego for La usurpadora	Andrés Burgos for Cita a ciegas; Vanesa Varela, Fernando Garcilita, and José Alberto Castro for Por amar sin ley; Carme Sepúlveda, Lucero Suárez, Maykel Ponjuán, and Luis Reynoso for Ringo; Pedro Rodríguez, Claudia Velazco, Humberto Robles, Alejandra Romero, Gerardo Zermeño, and Gustavo Bracco for Vencer el miedo

== Records ==
- Most awarded writer: María Zarattini, 4 times.
- Writers that won every nomination: Kary Fajer and Leonardo Bechini, 2 times.
- Most nominated writer: María Zarattini with 6 nominations.
- Most nominated writers without a win: Pedro Armando Rodríguez with 3 nominations.
- Youngest winners: María Zarattini and Eric Vonn, 31 years old.
- Youngest nominee: María Zarattini, 31 years old.
- Oldest winner: Yolanda Vargas Dulché, 70 years old.
- Oldest nominee: Delia Fiallo, 85 years old.
- Writers winning after short time: Leonardo Bechini by (La candidata, 2017) and (Caer en tentación, 2018), 2 consecutive years.
- Writers winning after long time:
  - María Zarattini by (De pura sangre, 1986) and (Destino, 1991), 5 years difference.
  - René Muñoz by (Quinceañera, 1988) and (De frente al sol, 1993), 5 years difference.
- Writers that winning the award for the same story:
  - María Zarattini (De pura sangre, 1986) and Martha Carrillo, Cristina García and Denisse Phiffer (Amor bravío, 2013)
  - Liliana Abud and Eric Vonn (Amor en silencio, 1989) and Martha Carrillo and Cristina García (A que no me dejas, 2016)
- Foreign winning writers:
  - María Zarattini from Italy
  - René Muñoz from Cuba
  - Eric Vonn from Guatemala
  - Fernando Gaitán from Colombia
  - Adrián Suar from United States
  - Leonardo Padrón from Venezuela
