= De pura sangre =

Mexican telenovela

- Genre: Telenovela
- Created by: María Zarattini
- Directed by: José Rendón
- Starring: Christian Bach; Humberto Zurita; Enrique Álvarez Félix
- Music by: Wolfgang Amadeus Mozart
- Opening theme: "Symphony No. 29"
- Country of origin: Mexico
- Original language: Spanish
- No. of episodes: 55

Production
- Executive producer: Ernesto Alonso
- Cinematography: Carlos Guerra
- Running time: 22 minutes
- Production company: Televisa

Original release
- Network: Canal de las Estrellas
- Release: December 9, 1985 – February 21, 1986

Related
- Angélica; La gloria y el infierno; La jaula de oro; Amor bravío

De pura sangre (English title: Of pure blood) is a Mexican telenovela produced by Ernesto Alonso for Televisa in 1985. Its original story of María Zarattini and directed by José Rendón.

Christian Bach and Humberto Zurita starred as protagonists, while Enrique Álvarez Félix, Manuel Ojeda and Víctor Junco starred as antagonists.

== Plot ==
In the "San Joaquin" ranch, located in the village of San Miguel Allende, millionaire dies Solis Don Alberto Duarte, owner of a large fortune and a prosperous farm where horses are bred thoroughbred. Its closest relative is his niece, Florence, who will marry his ambitious promises, Leonardo. This is the promise very happy thinking that his future wife will own a fortune, but, to his horror, Florencia will inherit only a small part of the money; the rest of the fortune of Don Alberto and the estate will pass into the hands of a stranger from Madrid, Alberto Salerno.

Homero, uncle of Leonardo interested as he performs plans for Alberto is arrested for drug trafficking on the way to Mexico. Meanwhile, Leonardo married Florencia and encouraged to contest the will due to the absence of the primary heir, and so she becomes mistress of everything but name only. However, almost a year later, Alberto escapes from prison during a fire and heads to San Miguel Allende with the idea of revenge in mind.

His prime suspect is obviously Florencia, for she knew he was on his way and also had reason to remove it. Alberto, who was police, begins his investigation. The name of Marcos gets, and gets a job as a laborer on the farm that is technically theirs. Florencia, trapped in a marriage that has not been consummated, is attracted to the new worker.

== Cast ==
- Christian Bach as Florencia Duarte Valencia
- Humberto Zurita as Alberto Salerno del Villar/Marcos Mejía
- Enrique Álvarez Félix as Leonardo Altamirano
- José Antonio Ferral as Fulgencio
- Manuel Ojeda as Carlos Meléndez
- Delia Casanova as Laura Blanchet
- Luis Xavier as Felipe
- Alicia Rodríguez as Beatriz Valencia Vda. de Duarte
- Víctor Junco as Homero Altamirano
- Arsenio Campos as Diego Bustamante
- Miguel Macía as Father Francisco Alvear
- Margarita Gralia as Andrea
- Ofelia Cano as Carmelita
- Jacarandá Alfaro as Chuy
- Maristel Molina as Ángela
- Carmen Cortés as Josefina
- Graciela Lara as Amparo
- Alberto Macías as Camilo
- Alejandro Ruiz as Agustín
- Fidel Garriga as Nicolás
- Thalía Salas as Regina
- Guillermo García Cantú as Anselmo Bustamante
- Josefina Castellanos as Lulú
- Raúl Morales as Lic. Hernández
- Tito Guízar as Juan
- Claudia Inchaurregui as Ana María Salerno
- José Chávez as Teniente González
- José Luis Llamas as Bernal
- Carlos Guerra as Javier
- Alfonso Kaffiti as Mario Salerno
- Jorge Victoria as Police's chief
- Adalberto Parra as Hampón
- Joaquín Gallegos
- Miguel Angel Negrete as Teniente Gallegos
- Rosa Elena Díaz as Rosa del Villar
- Julia Marichal
- Arturo Laphan
- Carl Hillos
- Fortino Salazar

== Awards ==
| Year | Award | Category | Nominee | Result |
|---|---|---|---|---|
| 1986 | 4th TVyNovelas Awards | Best Telenovela of the Year | Ernesto Alonso | Won |
| 1986 | 4th TVyNovelas Awards | Best Actress | Christian Bach | Nominated |
| 1986 | 4th TVyNovelas Awards | Best Actor | Humberto Zurita | Won |
| 1986 | 4th TVyNovelas Awards | Best Antagonist Actor | Enrique Álvarez Félix | Won |
| 1986 | 4th TVyNovelas Awards | Best Antagonist Actor | Manuel Ojeda | Nominated |
| 1986 | 4th TVyNovelas Awards | Best Leading Actress | Alicia Rodríguez | Nominated |
| 1986 | 4th TVyNovelas Awards | Best Young Lead Actress | Delia Casanova | Nominated |
| 1986 | 4th TVyNovelas Awards | Best Female Revelation | Ofelia Cano | Won |
| 1986 | 4th TVyNovelas Awards | Best Female Revelation | Jacaranda Alfaro | Nominated |
| 1986 | 4th TVyNovelas Awards | Best Female Debut | Claudia Incháurregui | Nominated |
| 1986 | 4th TVyNovelas Awards | Best Male Debut | Guillermo García Cantú | Nominated |
| 1986 | 4th TVyNovelas Awards | Best Male Debut | Luis Xavier | Won |
| 1986 | 4th TVyNovelas Awards | Best Direction | José Rendón | Won |
| 1986 | 4th TVyNovelas Awards | Best Original Story or Adaptation | María Zarattini | Won |
