= Pueblo chico, infierno grande =

Mexican historical telenovela

- Genre: Telenovela
- Written by: Mario Hernández; Sergio Schmucler
- Story by: Javier Ruán
- Directed by: Benjamín Cann
- Starring: Verónica Castro; Guillermo Capetillo; Alma Delfina; Juan Soler
- Theme music composer: Juan Carlos Calderón
- Opening theme: "Pena de amor y muerte" by Verónica Castro
- Country of origin: Mexico
- Original language: Spanish
- No. of episodes: 150

Production
- Executive producers: José Alberto Castro; Ernesto Hernández
- Production locations: Michoacán, Puebla; Veracruz
- Cinematography: Isabel Basurto
- Editor: Héctor Márquez
- Camera setup: Multi-camera
- Production company: Televisa

Original release
- Network: Canal de las Estrellas
- Release: January 6 – August 1, 1997

Pueblo chico, infierno grande (English: Small town, big hell) is a Mexican historical telenovela set in the Pre-Mexican Revolution period, produced by José Alberto Castro for Televisa in 1997. From Monday, January 6, 1997 until Friday, August 1, 1997, Canal de las Estrellas broadcast it weekdays at 10:00pm, replacing Te sigo amando and replaced by Salud, dinero y amor. Televisa released an abridged DVD version of the novela in several countries. It also aired on Univisión in the United States.

Starring Verónica Castro, Guillermo Capetillo, Alma Delfina and Juan Soler.

== Background ==
Pueblo chico, infierno grande is a colloquial expression in Spanish, translated as "small town, big hell".

It is also the title of a 1926 Chilean movie directed by Nicanor de la Sotta, starring Ernestina Estay, Evaristo Lillo and Plácido Martín

It is also a 1941 Argentinian movie by Orestes Caviglia, written by Henri Martinent and Eduardo Pappo, shot in Argentina with cinematography by Roque Funes, starring Arturo Bamio, Lucía Barause and Nélida Bilbao with music by Alejandro Gutiérrez del Barrio.

== Plot ==
Pueblo chico, infierno grande takes place in Nahuatzen, a small town in the Sierra Purépecha in Michoacán, Mexico, in early 1900. The young girl Leonarda Ruán (Aracely Arámbula), is the youngest daughter of the venerable Don Prisciliano Ruan (Enrique Rocha).

The day of the feast of the town's patron saint, Saint Louis of France, Leonarda discovers her feelings for Hermilo Jaimes (Kuno Becker), a poor boy who works in a grocery store. But that afternoon, the old Don Rosendo Equigua (Jorge Russek) the richest man in Nahuatzen, sets his eyes on the girl.

Don Prisciliano disapproves of the love between Leonarda and Hermilo, and yields the girl's hand to Rosendo. That same afternoon, a girl named Magdalena Beltran (Evangelina Sosa), falls for a young man nicknamed "El Batan" (Jose Maria Yazpik). Her mother, Inmaculada (Socorro Bonilla), is surprised that she feels lust for "El Batan".

Leonarda is forced to marry Rosendo. Hermilo leaves town, but swears he will be very powerful one day and return for her. Meanwhile, Magdalena discovers her mother in bed with "El Batan". She wanders the streets and falls into perdition in the whorehouse from "La Tapanca" (Lilia Aragón).

A few months after his marriage with Leonarda, Rosendo dies. At 16 years, Leonarda is a widow and Nahuatzen's richest woman, but she vows to wait for Hermilo.... 20 years go by, and Leonarda (Verónica Castro), returns from a long trip through Europe. On her return, while hanging around her properties she meets a handsome 20 year old young man named Genaro (Juan Soler).

Genaro and Leonarda feel a strong attraction for each other, and Leonarda lets him work on her farm. Throughout the town, women feel fascination for Genaro's striking resemblance with St. Louis. Some of the girls are Indalecia (Mónika Sánchez), an evil Indian, Leonarda's servant and Braulia Felicitas (Karyme Lozano), a rich girl from the region. But Genaro only has eyes for Leonarda, and both end up confessing their love.

The whole town is shocked by their relationship. Genaro is 16 years younger than Leonarda and could be her son. Meanwhile, Magdalena (Alma Delfina) now calls herself "La Beltraneja" and leads the whorehouse of "La Tapanca". Beltraneja and La tapanca has a faithful servant, "Odilón" (Hernán Del Riego)One night when Genaro and Leonarda argue, he visits the home of La Beltraneja, and drunk, asks her to marry him, sparking an obsession in the woman.

The evil Sheriff of Nahuatzen, Consejo Serratos (Salvador Sánchez), loves Leonarda and despises Genaro. The situation is further complicated when Hermilo Jaimes (Guillermo Capetillo) returning, now a rich gentleman. Leonarda reluctantly confesses Hermilo her new feelings. He decides to wait.

Leonarda refuses to marry Genaro, because she is sterile and can never bear children. The Puritan Leonarda's sisters, Cleotilde (Anna Silvetti), Eloísa (Olivia Bucio) and Jovita (Silvia Manríquez), are the main judges. Characters like the Father Arceo (Luis Gimeno), the healer Martina "La Perra" (Patricia Reyes Spíndola) the Nanny Maclovia (Angelina Peláez), Don Arcadio (José Carlos Ruiz) and Miss Gildarda (Beatriz Cecilia) are allies.

When La Beltraneja finds out above the love between Genaro and Leonarda, she becomes very jealous. Braulia and Indalecia are also in love with Genaro. Leonarda has to endure the calumnies of the people and fight for her love for Genaro.

Aside from the main story, there are stories of other villagers like the sisters Porfiria and Rutila Cumbios (Rosa Maria Bianchi and Ana Bertha Espín), Miss Gildard Zavala and her mother Mrs. Hipolita (Alicia Montoya), Leonarda's sisters, and Leonarda's nephews, Priscilla (Ana de la Reguera) and Baldo (Germán Gutiérrez), who are in love despite being first cousins, so a Little town, becomes a Big hell...

== Cast ==
- Verónica Castro as Leonarda Ruán
- Guillermo Capetillo as Hermilo Jaimez
- Alma Delfina as Magdalena
- Juan Soler as Genaro Onchi
- Luis Gimeno as Padre Arceo
- Jorge Martínez de Hoyos as Chucho Ríos
- Alicia Montoya as Doña Hipólita
- José Carlos Ruiz as Arcadio
- Salvador Sánchez as Consejo Serratos
- Lilia Aragón as La Tapanca
- Patricia Reyes Spíndola as Martina
- Anna Silvetti as Cleotilde
- Rosa María Bianchi as Porfiria Cumbios
- Olivia Bucio as Eloísa
- Angelina Peláez as Maclovia
- Ana Bertha Espín as Rutilia Cumbios
- Evangelina Martínez as Saturnina
- Monserrat Ontiveros as Melitona
- Luis Xavier as Antonio Serna
- Óscar Traven as Gumaro
- Mónika Sánchez as Indalecia
- Karyme Lozano as Braulia
- Orlando Miguel as Palemón Morales
- Juan Ignacio Aranda as Baldomero
- Germán Gutiérrez as Baldomero's son
- Beatriz Cecilia as Gildarda Zavala
- Theo Tapia as Estanislao Allende
- Adalberto Parra as Guadalupe Tiburcio
- Silvia Manríquez as Jovita
- Lourdes Deschamps as Cayetana
- José Maria Yazpik as Batán
- Hernán Del Riego as Odilón
- Alejandro Tomassi as Malfavón Heredia
- Aracely Arámbula as Young Leonarda Ruán
- Enrique Rocha as Ruán
- Jorge Russek as Don Rosendo Equigua
- Joana Brito as Vititos
- Evangelina Sosa as Young Magdalena
- Arcelia Ramírez as Ignacia Rentería
- Aarón Hernán as Felipe Tovar
- Socorro Bonilla as Inmaculada
- Martha Aura as Mercedes
- Manuel Guízar as Eduardo Rentería
- Mario Iván Martínez as Señor Onchi
- Fernando Torre Laphame as Señor Obispo
- Susana Zabaleta as Medarda Zavala
- José María Yazpik as Young Batán
- Zaide Silvia Gutiérrez as Olinca
- Víctor González as Young Gumaro Amezcua
- Ana de la Reguera as Priscila
- Adriana Fonseca as Jovita
- Marisol del Olmo as Leocadia
- Kuno Becker as Young Hermilio Jaimez
- Adriana Lavat as Dora Luz
- Alec Von Bargen as Malfavón

== Awards and nominations ==
Year	Award	Category	Nominee(s)	Result
1998	16th TVyNovelas Awards	Best Supporting Actress	Alma Delfina	Won
1998	16th TVyNovelas Awards	Best Young Lead Actor	Juan Soler	Won
1998	16th TVyNovelas Awards	Best Original Story or Adaptation	Javier Ruán	Won
1998	16th TVyNovelas Awards	Best Art Direction	Arturo Flores	Won
1998	16th TVyNovelas Awards	Best Decor	Sandra Cortés	Won
1999	Latin ACE Awards	Best Scenic Program	Pueblo chico, infierno grande	Won
1999	Latin ACE Awards	International Female Figure of the Year	Verónica Castro	Won

== Commentary ==
- Inspired by the true story of Leonarda Ruán, aunt of the writer Javier Ruán.
- The role of "La Beltraneja" was originally for Lucía Méndez, but she moved to TV Azteca.
- This was Verónica Castro´s last lead role of in a telenovela.
