= Vivir un poco =

Mexican telenovela

- Genre: Telenovela
- Created by: Jesús Calzada
- Written by: Paulinho de Oliveira; Carlos Romero
- Directed by: Rafael Banquells; Beatriz Sheridan; Jorge Sánchez Fogarty
- Starring: Rogelio Guerra; Angélica Aragón
- Theme music composer: Amparo Rubín
- Opening theme: Instrumental (Piano)
- Country of origin: Mexico
- Original language: Spanish
- No. of episodes: 192

Production
- Executive producer: Valentín Pimstein
- Production locations: Mexico City; Aculco; Valle de Bravo; Buenos Aires, Argentina
- Cinematography: Manuel Ruiz Esparza; Leopoldo Ferrazas
- Running time: 21-22 minutes
- Production company: Televisa

Original release
- Network: Televisa
- Release: 29 July 1985 – 25 April 1986

Related
- La madrastra (1981); Para toda la vida (1996); Forever (1996); La madrastra (2005) ¿Quién mató a Patricia Soler? (2014); La madrastra (2022)

Vivir un poco (English title: To Live a Little) is a Mexican telenovela which was produced and broadcast by Televisa in 1985. The story was a remake of the very popular Chilean telenovela La Madrastra from 1981. Vivir un poco tells the story of the quest of Andrea to find justice and her long-lost children, but she must face the lies and intrigues of the past and the present. A story full of questions (Why? Who? How?) and the mystery of uncovering the identity of a murderer and discovering family secrets. The series stars Rogelio Guerra and Angélica Aragón.

When this telenovela aired, during commercial breaks, Televisa showed a 10-second mini-commercial where all the suspects to the murder, including Andrea herself, were shown one by one and a voice-over asked "¿Quién es el verdadero asesino? ¿Quién?" ("Who is the real muerderer? Who?").

== Plot ==
In 1965 Andrea travels to Buenos Aires, Argentina, together with her husband, Gregorio, his 2 sisters and a group of family friends. During the trip, a young woman in their group, Martha, is murdered in her hotel room and Andrea is discovered at the crime scene holding the gun with which Martha was murdered. As all evidence initially points to Andrea as the murderer, she is tried and sentenced to prison for Martha's murder.

Her husband and friends believe she is guilty and abandon her in Argentina, returning to Mexico and vowing never to mention Andrea's name again. Gregorio decides to lie to his children when they grow up. He makes them adore the portrait of a woman that doesn't exist, thinking she is their dead mother. He does this in order to erase Andrea's memory from their lives once and for all, as he is convinced she will never return, finishing her days in the same prison where he has abandoned her.

== Cast ==
=== Main ===
- Rogelio Guerra† as Gregorio Merisa Obregón
- Angélica Aragón as Andrea Santos de Merisa Obregón

=== Recurring ===
- Carlos Ancira† as Abundacio Llanos del Toro
- Nuria Bages as Alfonsina Dávalos de Larrea
- Roberto Ballesteros as Marcos Llanos del Toro
- Augusto Benedico† as Father Benigno
- Gregorio Casal† as Gonzalo Marcos
- Alma Delfina as Paulina Fernández
- Juan Antonio Edwards as Rogelio Andrave Estravados
- Jaime Garza† as Tintoretto Fernández
- Manuel "Flaco" Ibáñez as Leonardo Rafael Fernández
- Rafael Inclán as Filogonio Llanos del Toro "Marabunta"
- Irma Lozano† as Rosa Merisa Obregón
- María Martín as La Baronesa
- Felicia Mercado as Magdalena Dávalos
- Aurora Molina† as Vicenta "La Muda"
- Inés Morales as Lilia de Marcos
- Patricia Pereyra as Atenas Merisa Obregón
- Beatriz Sheridan† as Aura Merisa Obregón
- Liliana Weimer as Silvina

=== Guest stars ===
- Bety Catania as Gina
- Gastón Tuset as Alejandro Luccino
- Wolf Rubinsky as Jail mayor
- Raquel Argandoña as Raquel

== Awards and nominations ==
Year	Award	Category	Nominee	Result
1986	4th TVyNovelas Awards	Best Telenovela	Valentín Pimstein	Nominated
1986	4th TVyNovelas Awards	Best Actress	Angélica Aragón	Won
1986	4th TVyNovelas Awards	Best Actor	Rogelio Guerra	Nominated
1986	4th TVyNovelas Awards	Best Antagonist Actress	Beatriz Sheridan	Nominated
1986	4th TVyNovelas Awards	Best Experienced Actor	Augusto Benedico	Nominated
1986	4th TVyNovelas Awards	Best Experienced Actor	Rafael Inclán	Nominated
1986	4th TVyNovelas Awards	Best Young Lead Actress	Alma Delfina	Nominated
1986	4th TVyNovelas Awards	Best Young Lead Actor	Arturo Peniche	Nominated
1986	4th TVyNovelas Awards	Best Young Lead Actor	Jaime Garza	Nominated
1986	4th TVyNovelas Awards	Best Young Lead Actor	Juan Antonio Edwards	Won
1986	4th TVyNovelas Awards	Best Male Revelation	Arturo Peniche	Won
1986	4th TVyNovelas Awards	Best Debut Actress	Patricia Pereyra	Won
1986	4th TVyNovelas Awards	Best Original Story or Adaptation	Paulinho de Oliveira; Carlos Romero	Nominated
1986	4th TVyNovelas Awards	Best Direction	Rafael Banquells	Nominated
1987	Latin ACE Awards	Best Actress	Angélica Aragón	Won
