= La traición (1984 TV series) =

- Genre: Telenovela; Romance; Drama
- Created by: Fernanda Villeli; Carmen Daniels
- Written by: Fernanda Villeli; Carmen Daniels
- Directed by: Raúl Araiza
- Starring: Helena Rojo; Jorge Vargas; Sergio Jiménez; Gonzalo Vega; Susana Alexander; Emilio Fernández
- Opening theme: Me niego by Juan Diego
- Country of origin: Mexico
- Original language: Spanish
- No. of episodes: 120

Production
- Executive producer: Ernesto Alonso
- Running time: 21-22 minutes
- Production company: Televisa

Original release
- Network: Canal de las Estrellas
- Release: October 30, 1984 – April 16, 1985

Related
- Eclipse; Angélica

La traición (English title:The betrayal) is a Mexican telenovela produced by Ernesto Alonso and directed by Raúl Araiza for Televisa in 1984.

Helena Rojo, Jorge Vargas and Gonzalo Vega starred as protagonists, while Sergio Jiménez and Susana Alexander starred as antagonists.

== Cast ==
- Helena Rojo as Antonia Guerra
- Jorge Vargas as Rafael del Valle
- Sergio Jiménez as Arturo Serrano
- Gonzalo Vega as Franco Visconti
- Susana Alexander as Estela Serrano de del Valle
- Emilio Fernández as Gral. Arcadio Carvajal
- Manuel Ojeda as Pech Gutiérrez
- Gina Romand as Margarita
- José Carlos Ruiz as Cholo
- Gabriela Ruffo as Alicia
- Rebecca Jones as Georgina Guerra
- Alejandro Camacho as Absalón
- Julieta Rosen as Julia
- Patricia Reyes Spíndola as Lázara
- Guillermo Aguilar as Gastón
- Nelson Millán as Eduardo del Valle
- Yolanda Ciani as Roberta
- Raúl Araiza as Cristóbal Guerra
- Roxana Chávez as Dalia
- Ofelia Cano as Gilda
- Fernando Ciangherotti as Mauricio
- Jerardo as Germán
- María Prado as María
- Jorge Ordaz as Laplace
- Ricardo Rivero as Journalist
- Luis Xavier
- José Zambrano as Police chief
- Javier Ruán as Rogelio
- José D'Alvarado as Rendón
- Marco Muñoz as Rodrigo Ruiz
- Aldo Pastur as Lawyer
- Lucy Tovar
- Blanca Torres as Rosario
- Teresa Velázquez
- Alejandro Ruiz

== Awards ==
Year	Award	Category	Nominee	Result
1985	3rd TVyNovelas Awards	Best Telenovela of the Year	Ernesto Alonso	Won
1985	3rd TVyNovelas Awards	Best Actress	Helena Rojo	Nominated
1985	3rd TVyNovelas Awards	Best Actress	Susana Alexander	Won
1985	3rd TVyNovelas Awards	Best Actor	Jorge Vargas	Nominated
1985	3rd TVyNovelas Awards	Best Actor	Sergio Jiménez	Won
1985	3rd TVyNovelas Awards	Best Antagonist Actor	Sergio Jiménez	Won
1985	3rd TVyNovelas Awards	Best Antagonist Actress	Gabriela Ruffo	Nominated
1985	3rd TVyNovelas Awards	Best Direction	Raúl Araiza	Won
