= Chispita (TV series) =

1982 Mexican telenovela

- From left to right Lucero and Angélica Aragón with their respective roles
- Genre: Telenovela
- Created by: Lucía Camen; Carlos Romero
- Based on: Andrea Celeste by Abel Santacruz
- Screenplay by: Vivian Pestalozzi
- Directed by: Pedro Damián
- Starring: Enrique Lizalde; Angélica Aragón; Gastón Tuset; Alma Delfina; Leonardo Daniel; Elsa Cárdenas; Manuel López Ochoa; Aurora Clavel; Renata Flores; Inés Morales; Samuel Molina; Josefina Escobedo; Roxana Chávez; Beatriz Moreno; Rogelio Guerra; Usi Velasco; Lucero
- Opening theme: "Chispita" performed by Timbiriche
- Country of origin: Mexico
- Original language: Spanish
- No. of episodes: 200

Production
- Executive producer: Valentín Pimstein
- Cinematography: Manuel Ruiz Esparza
- Production company: Televisa

Original release
- Network: Canal de las Estrellas
- Release: November 11, 1982 – August 19, 1983

Related
- La fiera; Luz Clarita

Chispita (English title: Little Spark) is a Mexican telenovela produced by Valentín Pimstein for Televisa in 1982. It's an original story by Abel Santa Cruz, the telenovela is a remake of the 1979 Argentinean telenovela Andrea Celeste.

Lucero starred as child protagonist, Angélica Aragón and Enrique Lizalde starred as adult protagonists, Usi Velasco starred as co-protagonist, Alma Delfina and Leonardo Daniel starred as young co-protagonists, while Renata Flores starred as main antagonist.

== Plot ==
María Luisa and her husband had a terrible car accident, her husband dies and she lost her memory completely and she is not able to remember anything at all. Because of this incident, María Luisa forgot that she had a daughter, Isabel, who became an orphan and was therefore taken to the orphanage of Father Eugenio, where Isabel begins to live on and grow. When Isabel is 10 years old, she was adopted by Don Alejandro, a respectable man, widower and with 2 children, Juan Carlos y Lilí.

When Isabel is taken home, she meets Gloria, the maid, who becomes her friend, and so does Juan Carlos, but not Lilí or Miss Irene, Lili's tutor. Together, Miss Irene and Lily try to make life impossible for Isabel. Then, a woman named Bertha appears, who turns out to be María Luisa's sister, and she contacts Isabel and encourages her to look for her mother due to her strange disappearance. Meanwhile, María Luisa decides to name herself Lucía, due to her lack of memory, and she gets a job in the orphanage directed by Father Eugenio. When Isabel meets Lucía, they befriend each other, without knowing the familiar ties.

== Cast ==
=== Main ===
- Enrique Lizalde as Alejandro de la Mora
- Angélica Aragón as Lucía
- Gastón Tuset as Father Eugenio
- Alma Delfina as Gloria
- Leonardo Daniel as Juan Carlos de la Mora
- Elsa Cárdenas as Hermana Socorro
- Manuel López Ochoa as José
- Aurora Clavel as Flora
- Renata Flores as Irene
- Inés Morales as Pilar
- Samuel Molina as Rogelio
- Josefina Escobedo as Directora
- Roxana Chávez as Olga
- Beatriz Moreno as Lola
- Rogelio Guerra as Esteban
- Usi Velasco as Lili
- Lucero as Isabel / Chispita

=== Recurring ===
- Alberto Mayagoitia as Ángel Guardián
- Hilda Aguirre as Tía Beatriz

== Reception and music ==
Due to its international success, it was decided to make a special album by Timbiriche that included the main theme. However, Lucerito did not sing the theme, but in a special performance by Timbiriche and Lucerito, they sing it together. The soundtrack was recorded in Spanish and Portuguese languages. In Brazil, this telenovela has been broadcast 8 times and Chispita dolls has been sold.

Chispita's opening credits is almost a copy of another opening credits: Pai Herói (Lit. Father Hero) also had its episodes beginning with a jigsaw puzzle being assembled, of which the pictures was a child in a garden, beyond others resemblances. Pai Herói is a Brazilian telenovela produced in 1979 by Rede Globo, and written by Janete Clair. It was a great success in Brazil. Brazilian watchers noted that fact in 1984, when SBT had exhibited Chispita in the country.

The jigsaw intro has the curious point that it was never completed specially in a specific part of the board, but in the progress of the story, new pieces were added and in the last episodes a shaded form appears as a woman walking with Chispita. After the revelation of Chispita's mother identity the shade changed to a full color image of Chispita's mother.

== Awards ==
Year	Award	Category	Nominee	Result
1983	1st TVyNovelas Awards	Best Child Performance	Lucero	Won
1983	Azteca de Oro Awards	Best Breakthrough Performance	Lucero	Won
