= Christian Bach =

Mexican actress (1959–2019)

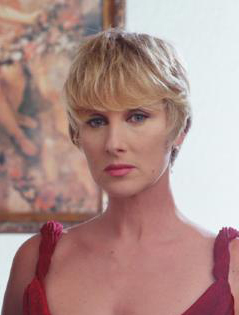
- Born: Adela Christian Bach Bottino; May 9, 1959; Buenos Aires, Argentina
- Died: February 26, 2019 (aged 59); Los Angeles, California, U.S.
- Occupations: Actress, producer
- Years active: 1976–2014
- Spouse: Humberto Zurita (m. 1986)
- Children: Sebastián Zurita; Emiliano Zurita
- Mother: Adela Adamova

Adela Christian Bach Bottino (May 9, 1959 – February 26, 2019), known as Christian Bach, was an Argentine-born Mexican actress and producer of telenovelas produced by companies such as Televisa, TV Azteca and Telemundo.

Her most famous works in telenovelas with Televisa included Los ricos también lloran (1979), Soledad (1980), Bodas de odio (1983), De pura sangre (1985) and Encadenados (1988). With TV Azteca her most relevant works included Agua y aceite (2002), which she also produced along with her husband Humberto Zurita, and Vidas robadas (2010). With Telemundo her works included La Patrona (2013) and La Impostora (2014).

== Biography ==
Bach was born in Buenos Aires to Roberto Bach Meizegeier and Adela Bottino Adamova (better known as Adela Adamova). After graduating with a degree in law Christian Bach moved to Mexico to become an actress. She started working in plays and in films, where her voice was often dubbed to conceal her Argentine accent. She obtained a small role in the worldwide hit telenovela Los ricos también lloran in 1979 and four years later a starring role in the successful Bodas de odio.

In 1986 she co-starred with Zurita in De pura sangre and in the same year they got married. Ten years later and after a string of successful productions with Televisa the Zurita-Bach couple decided to form their own production company, ZUBA Producciones, and to move to nascent network TV Azteca. Two years later they produced two telenovelas for the station, La chacala and Azul Tequila, a successful production that launched the careers of Bárbara Mori and Mauricio Ochmann. In the 1980s she recorded an album as a solo singer, but the album lacked success and interest from the public.

In 1984 and 1989, Bach won the Best Actress award at the TVyNovelas. She also won the Best Actress TuMundo from Telemundo in 2013.

Bach died on February 26, 2019, due to respiratory failure. Her death was announced March 1 due to the actress' desire to keep personal matters private.

== Filmography ==
=== Films ===
| Year | Title | Role | Notes |
|---|---|---|---|
| 1977 | Brigada en acción | | |
| 1980 | La venganza del lobo negro | | |
| 1981 | Duelo a muerte | | |
| 1985 | Secuestro sangriento | | |
| 1985 | Gavilán o paloma | Anel | |
| 1989 | Los placeres ocultos | | |
| 1992 | Soy libre | | |
| 1993 | Yo, tú, el, y el otro | | |
| 1994 | El hombre de Blanco | Erika | |
| 2008 | Trancoso, retazos de vidas | Rafaella | Short film |
| 2010 | El secreto | Claudine | |
| 2013 | Deseo | Señora | |

=== Television ===
| Year | Title | Role | Notes |
|---|---|---|---|
| 1978 | La mujer frente al amor | | 3 episodes |
| 1978 | Te sigo queriendo Ana | | |
| 1979 | Verónica | María Teresa | 3 episodes |
| 1979 | Propiedad horizontal | Vicky | 19 episodes |
| 1979 | Los ricos también lloran | Joanna Smith | |
| 1980-1981 | Soledad | Chelo Sánchez Fuentes | 284 episodes |
| 1980 | Colorina (Mexican TV series) | Peggy | 3 episodes |
| 1982 | El amor nunca muere | Cecilia | 194 episodes |
| 1983 | Bodas de odio | Magdalena | 151 episodes |
| 1985 | De pura sangre | Florencia | 55 episodes |
| 1988-1989 | Encadenados | Catalina | 179 episodes |
| 1991 | Atrapada | Camila Montero | 95 episodes |
| 1993 | Videoteatros: Véngan corriendo que les tengo un muerto | | |
| 1995 | Bajo un mismo rostro | Irene Saldívar Teodorakis | 100 episodes |
| 1996 | La antorcha encendida | María Ignacia "Güera" Rodríguez | 138 episodes |
| 1997 | La chacala | Gilda Almada / Liliana Almada / Delia de Almada / La chacala | 180 episodes |
| 2002 | Agua y aceite | Julieta | 68 episodes |
| 2010 | Vidas robadas | María Julia Echeverría de Fernández Vidal / Maria Emilia Echeverria Ruiz | 141 episodes |
| 2013 | La Patrona | Antonia Guerra "La Patrona" | 127 episodes |
| 2014 | La impostora | Raquel Altamira | 120 episodes |

== TV shows ==
- Videoteatros: Véngan corriendo que les tengo un muerto (1993; producer)

== See also ==
- Foreign-born artists in Mexico
- List of Argentines
