= List of Mi Pecado characters =

Mi pecado is a Mexican telenovela that aired on El Canal de las Estrellas in 2009. Set in the fictional town of San Pedro in Chiapas, the show centers on two young adults, Lucrecia Córdoba Pedraza (Maite Perroni) and Julián Huerta Almada (Eugenio Siller), whose love is opposed by their families as the result of a tragic childhood accident that claimed the life of Lucrecia's brother. The telenovela follows the trials and tribulations that keep the young couple apart, as well as Lucrecia's less-than-warm relationship with her mother, Rosario (Daniela Castro), and the shattered relationship of childhood best friends Paulino Córdoba (Roberto Blandón), Gabino Roura (Sergio Goyri), Rodolfo Huerta (Francisco Gattorno), and Matías Quroga (Salvador Sánchez) that results from César's death and Rodolfo's adulterous wife, Justina Almada (Sabine Moussier). The main cast consists of approximately twenty characters and is supplemented by several minor characters.

== Main characters ==
=== The Córdobas ===
- Paulino Córdoba (Roberto Blandón) is the owner of the "El Milagro" hacienda, an apple orchard, as well as the husband of Rosario Pedraza; the father of their two children, Lucrecia and César; and the childhood friend of Rodolfo Huerta, Gabino Roura, and Matías Quiroga. Paulino desires to make his hacienda as impressive as possible for the day when he anticipates that his son will take over, believing that Lucrecia, as a girl, is not suited for the business world of men. Paulino's dreams are shattered when César drowns at the age of nine, and again some months later when Rosario miscarries their unborn son. He dearly loves his daughter, but he sends Lucrecia away to boarding school because he can see that Rosario has forgotten how to love her. Before marrying Rosario, Paulino dated Justina Almada, who is now married to his best friend, Rodolfo, and the two later had an adulterous affair that resulted in the birth of Justina's son, Josué, which Paulino discovered upon learning that the two shared the rare blood type B−. The memory of his affair with Justina creates a terrible feeling of guilt within Paulino that nearly destroys him. Paulino eventually dies near the end of the series of smoke inhalation as the result of a fire set by Simón Méndez, who was sent by Carmelo.
- Rosario Pedraza de Córdoba (Daniela Castro) is the snobbish, but devoutly religious wife of Paulino Córdoba and the mother of their two children, Lucrecia and César. Rosario has always preferred César to Lucrecia because he is male and showers attention upon him while treating Lucrecia coldly, even sometimes hatefully. She is destroyed by her son's death and is again devastated when, less than a year later, she miscarries the son whom she had intended to name Francisco. Rosario blames Lucrecia for the death of both of her sons and orders Paulino to send their daughter away, which he does. In addition to blaming Lucrecia, Rosario also faults Julián Huerta for César's death, slapping him and calling him "El Chamuco" (The Devil) at César's funeral, a nickname that unfortunately sticks to the young boy. Upon Lucrecia's return to San Pedro, Rosario does everything in her power to keep her from being with Julián and schemes to have her daughter marry Carmelo Roura. At the end of the series, Rosario finally admits the real reason for which she has always hated Lucrecia: her daughter is simultaneously her sister, the result of her being raped at the hands of her own father. Rosario finally accepts her daughter and newborn grandson, but she commits suicide in the river where César died in the final episode.
- Lucrecia Córdoba Pedraza (Daniela Aedo / Maite Perroni) is the daughter of Paulino and Rosario and the sister of César. When the show begins, Lucrecia is a sweet, docile nine-year-old girl who has practically been raised by the family's maid, Delfina, following her mother's rejection. Lucrecia shares a blossoming romance with Julián Huerta, a boy form a lower class, but they are torn apart when Lucrecia's mother, Rosario, blames him for her brother, César's, tragic death. After Rosario suffers a miscarriage after falling down the stairs while accosting Lucrecia, Rosario blames Lucrecia for the tragedy, and she is sent away to a boarding school in Oaxaca, where she becomes roommates with her cousin, Renata. A decade later, Lucrecia returns to San Pedro having turned into a self-confident young woman who rebels against her parents' wishes in order to be with Julián. However, Lucrecia is forced to marry Carmelo Roura in order to save Julián from being wrongly imprisoned; she spends three years unhappily married to Carmelo before Julián returns to San Pedro. The couple reunites, but when Lucrecia tries to leave Carmelo he rapes her, and when she subsequently becomes pregnant she is left unsure of who fathered her child. Lucrecia eventually divorces Carmelo, marries Julián, and gives birth to their son, César, before living happily ever after with her family. Lucrecia and her brother, César, are originally said to be twins early in the series, but the revelation that Lucrecia is the product of Rosario's rape creates a retcon so that Lucrecia is César's older sister.
- César Córdoba Pedraza (Diego Velásquez) is the son of Paulino and Rosario and the brother of Lucrecia. Lucrecia and her brother, César, are originally said to be twins early in the series, but the revelation that Lucrecia is the product of Rosario's rape creates a retcon so that Lucrecia is César's older sister. One Sunday, while playing by the forbidden river with Lucrecia, Julián, Josué, and Manuel, César attempts to cross the river on a fallen tree trunk following a dare from Josué and falls into the water; because he cannot swim, he is swept away by the current and goes over the edge of the waterfall. Although Lucrecia and Manuel tell Rosario otherwise, she blames Julián for César's death, thus creating the driving force behind the story.
- Renata Valencia (Jessica Coch) is the daughter of Paulino's cousin, Alberto. Born in Mexico City, Renata's mother died when she was very young, and her father sent her away to boarding school in Oaxaca, where she is later joined by her cousin Lucrecia. Before graduating, Renata's father commits suicide as a result of his economic problems, leaving his daughter with nothing but her education, which she had squandered. Renata accidentally kills the headmistress in an altercation and flees to San Pedro with Lucrecia, where she becomes obsessed with Carmelo Roura, who has eyes only for Lucrecia. Renata joins up with Rosario to separate Julián and Lucrecia after Rosario promises to provide for her financially, but as a result Lucrecia is forced to marry Carmelo. Renata becomes Carmelo's lover, but he eventually turns against her. Renata makes up with Lucrecia, but she dies in Lucrecia's arms after Carmelo accidentally shoots her.

=== The Huertas ===
- Rodolfo Huerta (Francisco Gattorno) is an honest and hardworking school teacher who is married to the ambitious Justina Almada, with whom he has two sons, Julián and Josué. Rodolfo loves his wife deeply, but he is unable to provide her with the fabulous lifestyle that she desires and turns to drinking. He eventually learns of his wife's infidelity with his best friend, Gabino Roura, and lashes out at the two, although he and Justina try to rebuild their marriage after Gabino dies and Justina is raped. The couple eventually divorce, however, and Rodolfo is devastated to learn that Josué is not his biological son. Rodolfo later meets Irene, a divorcée with a young daughter, and he forms a happy family with them.
- Justina Almada de Huerta (Sabine Moussier) is the ambitious, sensual wife of Rodolfo and the mother of Julián and Josué. Justina was with both Paulino and Gabino many years ago but eventually married Rodolfo, a simple school teacher who could give her love and adoration but not the wealthy, fabulous lifestyle of which she had always dreamed. She briefly had an affair with Paulino, which resulted in her youngest son, Josué, and then later has a long affair with Gabino. Despite her moral ambiguity, Justina deeply loves her two sons but forbids Julián to be with Lucrecia after the girl discovered her kissing Gabino. She also doubts Julián's innocence in César's death after Josué lies to her and tells her that Julián dared the little boy to cross the river. Years later, Justina's husband and sons scorn her when her affair with Gabino becomes known; after being raped by a stranger, Justina attempts to turn a new leaf, but three years later she is again cheating on her husband. Justina eventually leaves San Pedro, leaving her sons a letter in which she acknowledges all of the harm she had unwittingly done to them, and winds up completely alone, abandoned by her lover.
- Julián Huerta Almada (Adriano / Eugenio Siller) is the kind, hard-working son of Rodolfo and Justina and the older brother of Josué. At twelve years old, Julián had a blossoming relationship with Lucrecia Córdoba, but the two were torn apart after Lucrecia's mother, Rosario, blamed Julián for César's death. Julián thus became known as "El Chamuco" (The Devil) and was a virtual outcast in San Pedro for the next ten years. Upon Lucrecia's return from boarding school, the two reunite, but after Julián is blamed for Gabino Roura's murder, Lucrecia is forced to marry Carmelo Roura to save Julián; however, Julián is unaware of the deal and believes that Lucrecia has betrayed him. Julián leaves San Pedro and reunites with his ex-girlfriend, Lorena Mendizábal, returning three years later. Upon finding out of the misunderstanding, Julián and Lucrecia eventually reunite, marry, and welcome a son, César.
- Josué Huerta Almada (Robín Vega / Diego Amozurrutia) is the son of Rodolfo and Justina and the younger brother of Julián. Josué has always been closest to his mother and resented his father and brother's close relationship. Josué is hideously jealous of Julián and wants Lucrecia for himself, but, after being crippled in a car accident, Josué decides to become a priest, taking pleasure in the authority that his role gives him. Josué eventually learns that his father is not Rodolfo but Paulino, making Lucrecia his half-sister. He subsequently leaves the priesthood and apologizes to his brother for all of his malice. Josué ends up with Blanca at the end of the series, and they leave San Pedro together in order to be happy.

=== The Rouras ===
- Gabino Roura (Sergio Goyri) is an evil and ambitious man who only married his wife, Inés, for her fortune, and who cares little for his children, Carmelo and Teresa. In the beginning of the series, he murders his wife and continues his affair with his childhood friend Rodolfo's wife, Justina. A businessman, Gabino owns the lands on which Paulino's apple orchard rests. Despite sleeping with Justina, Gabino becomes enamored with Paulino's daughter, Lucrecia, and desires to marry her, aware that his son, Carmelo, is also obsessed with her. As a result, Carmelo murders his father out of jealousy in episode 48 and frames Julián for the crime.
- Inés Valdivia de Roura (Lucía Méndez) is the ill, suffering wife of Gabino and the mother of Carmelo and Teresa. Inés is slowly dying, unaware that her seemingly caring husband, Gabino, has been poisoning her for many months. After Justina tells her that Gabino is cheating on her (neglecting to mention the fact that his affair is with herself), Inés determines to divorce Gabino, but Gabino murders her at the end of the second episode before she can leave him penniless.
- Carmelo Roura Valdivia (Armando Araiza) is the lazy, playboy son of Gabino and Inés who later becomes the series' primary villain. Carmelo becomes motherless at a young age, and his father's lack of caring towards his two young children transforms him into an irresponsible young man who uses and impregnates the innocent Blanca, then refuses to take responsibility for their child. Despite dating Renata, Carmelo becomes obsessed with Lucrecia and murders his father for being his rival, and marries Lucrecia in exchange for keeping Julián out of jail for Gabino's murder. Three years later, Julián returns to San Pedro and begins fighting for Lucrecia; when Lucrecia announces her intention to divorce Carmelo, he rapes his wife. Lucrecia still leaves Carmelo, but she becomes pregnant and is unsure as to whether Carmelo or Julián is the child's father. Carmelo accidentally murders Paulino and Renata in his attempts to regain Lucrecia and is eventually sentenced to many years in prison.
- Teresa Roura Valdivia (Gabriela Carrillo) is the cheerful daughter of Gabino and Inés. Following her mother's death, Tere was primarily raised by the family's maid, Asunción, and unsuccessfully vied for her father's attention. Tere falls in love with Julián, who has eyes only for Lucrecia, and she eventually decides to help Julián be with Lucrecia. She eventually finds love with Manuel, and they leave San Pedro to escape the sad memories of her family that remain there.

=== The Quirogas ===
- Father Matías Quiroga (Salvador Sánchez) is the priest in San Pedro and the childhood best friend of Paulino, Rodolfo, and Gabino. Matías watches with sadness as César's death tears Paulino and Rodolfo apart and becomes a principal advocate for Julián and Lucrecia's love. Following her parents' death, Matías raises his niece, Blanca, with whom, thanks to a vengeful lie told by Justina, he is accused of having an incestuous relationship.
- Blanca Quiroga (Jackie García) is the sweet and innocent niece of Father Matías, who has raised her since she became an orphan. The naïve Blanca falls for the charms of womanizer Carmelo, sleeping with and becoming pregnant by him. Carmelo refuses to take responsibility for Blanca's condition, and the young woman eventually loses the baby. She develops feelings for Manuel, but after his gentle rejection she falls in love with Josué, and they leave San Pedro to be together.

=== Other main characters ===
- Rita López (María Prado) is the owner of a store in San Pedro and is the town gossip. In order to have revenge on Matías for convincing Gabino to end their affair, Justina tells Rita that she saw Matías kissing his niece, Blanquita, and Rita proceeds to tell the entire town and to scorn Matías and Blanca.
- Asunción Torres (Tina Romero) is the Roura family's maid who raised Carmelo and Teresa following their mother's death. She discovers shortly after Gabino's death that her late boss's murderer is none other than his own son, Carmelo, but she keeps quiet about his crime out of maternal love.
- Delfina Solís (Magda Karina) is the Córdoba family's maid and the mother of Manuel. Delfina grew up alongside Rosario and eventually served as Lucrecia's wetnurse. Delfina has been like a mother to Lucrecia, who was always rejected by her mother in favor of her brother. In the decade that Lucrecia is away from San Pedro, Delfina marries Modesto, who becomes a loving husband and father to her son, Manuel, whose father Fidel abandoned her when she was pregnant.
- Manuel Solís (Alejandro Cervantes / Aldo Gallardo) is the son of Delfina and the "hermano de leche" (brother by milk) of Lucrecia. Manuel has always harbored feelings for Lucrecia, but he supports her in her attempts to be with Julián because he wants her to be happy. He eventually falls in love with Teresa.
- Modesto Flores (Antonio Medellín) is the foreman at "El Milagro" and the trusted employee of Paulino. Modesto falls in love with Delfina, and they marry in the decade that Lucrecia is in boarding school. He becomes a devoted stepfather to Manuel.
- Fidel Cruz (Gilberto de Anda) is Manuel's biological father, who left San Pedro after getting Delfina pregnant. Upon his return to San Pedro, he becomes a trusted employee of the Rouras, attacking Julián on behalf of both Gabino and later Carmelo. Fidel is recognizable by his frequent use of English phrases, such as "take it easy", "what's happening?", and "little boss" (in reference to Carmelo). He is later shot and killed by Carmelo.
- Matilde (Úrsula Prats) is Lorena's aunt. She is a great support to her niece, although she disapproves of Lorena and Julián's relationship and prefers that Lorena be with her nephew by marriage, Miguel.
- Ernesto Mendizabal (Sergio Reynoso) is Lorena's wealthy, sensible father who, like Paulino and Gabino, is in the business of producing and distributing apples. After Julián leaves San Pedro and moves to Xalapa, Ernesto takes his daughter's ex under his wing and trains him to take over his business, as Ernesto is very ill and senses that his death is near. Instead of dying of natural causes, however, Ernesto is murdered by Carmelo, who smothers him with a pillow after Ernesto tells Carmelo that Gabino would feel disappointed by him, were he still alive.
- Lorena Mendizábal (Vannya Valencia / Altair Jarabo) is the ex-girlfriend of Julián and the daughter of Ernesto Mendizábal, one of Gabino's business associates. After Julián leaves San Pedro following Lucrecia and Carmelo's marriage, he and Lorena become involved once more and return to San Pedro engaged three years later. Lorena becomes incredibly jealous of Lucrecia and does everything to keep her away from Julián. After crashing her car in an attempt to kill Lucrecia and Julián, Lorena is left severely disfigured.
- Miguel (Ricardo Franco) is Matilde's nephew by marriage who is in love with Lorena. His aunt supports his attempts to win Lorena because she does not approve of Julián due to his humble roots.
