= Francisco Gattorno =

Cuban-Mexican actor

- Born: Francisco Alejandro Gattorno Sánchez; October 12, 1964 (age 61); Santa Clara, Cuba
- Occupation: Actor
- Years active: 1985–present
- Spouse(s): Cynthia Klitbo (1995-1997); Belmaris González Suazo (2001 present)
- Children: Isabella Gattorno González; Carolina Alicia Gattorno González

Francisco Alejandro Gattorno Sánchez (Spanish pronunciation: [fɾanˈsisko ɣaˈtoɾno]; born October 12, 1964), better known in the show business world plainly as Francisco Gattorno, is a Cuban actor.

== Biography ==
Gattorno grew up in Santa Clara. He is a son of a Canarian father, and mother whose grandparents descended from the French colonial population of Saint Domingue. He became interested in acting and directing as a young man. As a child, Gattorno became very fond of Cuban customs, such as Cuban music and sports. It was acting and directing, however, that occupied his interests more. Because of that, Gattorno studied acting, both at home in Cuba and in Mexico. He earned Mexican citizenship during the early 2000s.

In 1985, 21-year-old Gattorno made his professional film debut, participating as Miguel in a Cuban production Una Novia para David ("A Girlfriend for David"). Before this chance he had played in amateur films as Tomas Piard's Boceto where he made a brief full frontal nudity. Three years passed, before Gattorno got his next job in this media, in El Verano de la Señora Forbes ("The Summer of Miss Forbes"). El Verano de la Señora Forbes gave Gattorno his first exposition in Mexico and was also seen in the Netherlands. In 1989 he played a small role in 1989's Papeles Secundarios ("Secondary Roles").

His next job took him to Spain, as he participated in the 1992 Cuban-Spaniard production Me Alquilo Para Soñar. In 1993, Gattorno proceeded to work on another Cuban film, Sueño Tropical. Gattorno was by then a well-known actor in Cuba. His salaries, however, were comparatively small compared to those of well known actors in other Latin American countries.

Gattorno travelled to Chile before 1993 was over, to participate in filmmaker Paola Castillo's short production, Los Perros Tambien Tienen Hambre. Los Perros Tambien Tienen Hambre runs for an approximate total of four minutes. In 1994 was a breakthrough year for Gattorno: he moved to Mexico, participating in the well-known film Fresa y Chocolate ("Strawberry and Chocolate"), a film about a homosexual who falls in love with a communist man. Gattorno played Miguel in Fresa y Chocolate.

Having established himself in Mexico, Gattorno debuted on Televisa's telenovelas in 1995, acting as Josè Maria in La Dueña. In La Dueña, Gattorno acted alongside well-known Mexican actors such as Angélica Rivera, Salvador Sánchez and Eduardo Santamarina, among others. He also met his future wife, Cynthia Klitbo, at the time, a budding star herself.

In 1996, Gattorno acted alongside another list of well-known actors, including Costa Rican Maribel Guardia and Mexicans Joan Sebastian (Guardia's longtime husband), Olga Breeskin, Sebastian Ligarde, Claudio Báez, Itatí Cantoral, César Bono, José Ángel Garcia, Carlos Miguel, Guadalupe Esparza (of the well-known music group Bronco) and many others in Tu y Yo, which became an international hit, becoming one of the most viewed shows among Hispanics in the United States.

Tu y Yo was followed by Cañaveral de Pasiones, where Gattorno acted alongside fellow Cuban César Évora and other well-known Mexican actors, such as Angélica Aragón and others. Cañaveral de Pasiones was an important stepping stone in Gattorno's career; after this soap opera was over, many media outlets began to talk about his relationship with Klitbo, with whom he did not have any children.

In 1998, Gattorno participated in an action film, Engaño Mortal. He also acted as Alvaro San Roman in a telenovela named Preciosa. Gattorno and Èvora acted together once again in 1999's Laberintos de Pasion. Laberintos de Pasion was another major Televisa hit, by then, Gattorno had become a sex symbol among females in Mexico and Latin America, and among Hispanic females in the United States. He also participated that year in Entre la Tarde y la Noche.

Gattorno and Klithbo eventually divorced; Gattorno's fame kept growing, and, in 2000, he made his Hollywood debut, as Jorge Camacho in the low-budget film Before Night Falls. Gattorno then travelled to Colombia in 2001, to play Andres Bustamante in Amantes del Desierto. Soon after, he met Belmaris González Suazo, a Cuban ballet dancer who would become Gattorno's second wife. The couple share two daughters, Isabella and Carolina Alicia.

Gattorno continued his 2001 work with El noveno mandamiento. During 2002, Gattorno participated in a telenovela that was geared towards teenagers and which became a major hit: alongside Daniela Luján, Belinda Peregrin, Laura Flores and former Menudo Johnny Lozada, among others, Gattorno acted in Cómplices al rescate, a romantic story about youngsters trying to repair some broken relationships.

By then, Gattorno's fame had made him appear on the covers of some major Spanish language magazines in the United States. Gattorno finished 2002 (and began 2003) acting in another major teenage telenovela hit, Clase 406, where he acted alongside Michelle Vieth. Gattorno then took a one-year and a half hiatus from telenovelas. He used this time off, however, to appear on Don Francisco's talk show Don Francisco Presenta, on February 4, 2004. On April 8, he appeared alongside Raúl De Molina and Lili Estefan in their gossip show, El Gordo y La Flaca, and he co-hosted El Escandalo del Mediodia alongside Charytín, from August 16 to August 20. He returned to telenovela acting, characterizing Federico in Las Lloronas, and appeared in Cristina Saralegui's show during El Show de Cristina's Christmas special in December of that year.

In September 2004 he began a relationship with the Spanish Repertory Theatre of New York debuting there as the Lector (Juan Julián) in the World Premiere in Spanish of Pulitzer Prize Winning Drama Ana en el trópico by Cuban playwright, Nilo Cruz. The play garnered critical acclaim and became part of the theater's repertory of plays. It has been playing ever since. Gattorno also played Miguel in the popular comedy titled Las quiero a las dos by Ricardo Talesnik and also played a priest in Escrito y Sellado by Venezuelan playwright Isaac Chocrón. All of these plays have were directed by Repertorio Español's Artistic Director and co-founder, René Buch, also Cuban.

In 2005, Gattorno hosted Premios Lo Nuestro, an important award show seen all over Latin America. He also participated in two special editions of the show, named Noche de Estrellas: Premios lo Nuestro and Lo que no se Vio de Premios lo Nuestro. In 2005, Gattorno was incorporated as a new Telemundo star in the network's original production Tierra de Pasiones where he played the role of Pablo Gonzalez and shared credits with stars like Venezuelan actress Gabriela Spanic, Argentine actor Saul Lizaso and legendary Mexican actor and comedian Héctor Suárez.

Gattorno played Roberto in the 2005 movie La Migra, which was titled Murder on the Border to English speaking audiences. In 2006 Gattorno starred in the new Telemundo version of Julio Jimenez's, La Viuda de Blanco where he played the role of Sebastian Blanco and shared credits with Mexican actress Itatí Cantoral. He also starred in the Panamanian film Chance which won an international award in Habana, in 2010. He also returned in 2009 to Mexican telenovelas with his appearance alongside Sabine Moussier in the Televisa telenovela Mi Pecado. He played Rodolfo Huerta, father of Julian Eugenio Siller and Josue (Diego Amozurrutia), husband of Justina and he played a teacher. In 2009, he played Antonella's father Violeta Isfel in Atrévete a soñar.

In 2012, he returned to the telenovela with his friends Altair Jarabo and Sabine Moussier, along with fellow Cuban actor and friend César Évora in 1996. In the new version of Abismo de pasion is based on the remake of Cañaveral de Pasiones. He played Braulio is a Gabino and Lucio's boss of Arango Pepper Processing Company (La Anita/Santa Maria)'s peppers worker, he is the stepfather of Vicente (Adriano Zendejas) and husband of Antonia (Vanessa Arias). In 2012, he joined the cast of the telenovela Amores verdaderos, playing Santino "Salsero" Roca, the main antagonist / main villain of the story.

In 2013, he joined the cast of the telenovela Lo Que La Vida Me Robó playing Sandro Navarez, the secondary villain.

He owns property in Coconut Grove, Miami, Florida.

== Filmography ==
=== Television ===
Television
Year	Title	Role	Notes
1989	El verano de la señora Forbes	Aquiles	TV movie
1992	Me alquilo para soñar	Himself	6 episodes
1995	La dueña	José María	Lead role
1996-97	Tú y yo	Ricardo Vázquez	Main role
1996	Cañaveral de pasiones	Juan de Dios	Lead role
1998	Preciosa	Álvaro San Roman	Main role
1999-2000	Laberintos de pasión	Pedro Valencia	Lead role
2001	El noveno mandamiento	Rodrigo Betancourt	Lead role
2001-2002	Amantes del desierto	Andrés Bustamante	Lead role
2002	Cómplices al rescate	Alberto Del Río	Adult Lead role
2002-2003	Clase 406	Luis Felipe Villasana / Santiago Cadavid	Guest role
2006	Tierra de Pasiones	Pablo González	Supporting role
2006	La viuda de Blanco	Sebastián Blanco	Lead role
2009	Mi pecado	Rodolfo Huerta	Main role
2012	Abismo de pasión	Braulio	Supporting role
2012-2013	Amores verdaderos	Santino Roca "Salsero"	Supporting role
2014	Lo que la vida me robó	Sandro Narváez	Main cast
2014-2015	Muchacha italiana viene a casarse	Aníbal Valencia	Main cast
2016	Mujeres de negro	Lorenzo Rivera	Guest role
2017	El Bienamado	Jesús Tranquilino de la Asunción Cárdenas "Chuy Muertes"	Supporting role
2018	Hijas de la luna	Alberto Centeno	Supporting role
2018	Por amar sin ley	Damián Álvarez	
2018	El Señor de los Cielos	Gustavo Castro	
2021	La desalmada	Antonio Estudillo	
2022-2023	Amores que engañan	Marcel Rafael	Episode: "Solo una oportunidad" Episode: "Amor compartido"
2024	Vivir de amor	Antonio Sánchez	Guest role
2024	Amor amargo	Jaime Jiménez	Guest role
