= List of Abismo de pasión episodes =

Abismo de pasión (Abyss of Passion) is a Mexican telenovela produced by Angelli Nesma Medina and written by Caridad Bravo Adams for Televisa. It is a remake of Cañaveral de pasiones, produced by Christian Bach and Humberto Zurita in 1996. Both telenovelas are based on the novels Una sombra entre los dos and Al pie del altar, published in 1959.

== Episodes ==
Air Date	Number	Episode Title	Rating	Duration
January 23, 2012	001	Rechazo a Paloma	25.4	47 minutes
January 24, 2012	002	Suposiciones	N/A	42 minutes
January 25, 2012	003	Prohibiciones	20.6	48 minutes
January 26, 2012	004	Huir del pueblo	22.4	50 minutes
January 27, 2012	005	El amor de Carmina	21.5	49 minutes
January 30, 2012	006	Estefanía y Rosendo mueren	23.4	44 minutes
January 31, 2012	007	Día gris	22.4	43 minutes
February 1, 2012	008	Augusto y Carmina juntos	N/A	43 minutes
February 2, 2012	009	Elisa y Damián huyen	N/A	44 minutes
February 3, 2012	010	Embarazo en peligro	N/A	44 minutes
February 6, 2012	011	Dispuesto a todo	26.5	43 minutes
February 7, 2012	012	De chicos a grandes	27.0	43 minutes
February 8, 2012	013	Se desilusiona	26.9	43 minutes
February 9, 2012	014	El más guapo	27.2	44 minutes
February 10, 2012	015	Descubre a Carmina	25.7	43 minutes
February 13, 2012	016	Damián visita a Elisa	25.5	44 minutes
February 14, 2012	017	Mala fama	24.6	42 minutes
February 15, 2012	018	Florencia en el pueblo	24.8	43 minutes
February 16, 2012	019	Los prometidos discuten	24.9	43 minutes
February 17, 2012	020	La Verdad	26.0	43 minutes
February 20, 2012	021	Declaración de amor	25.5	43 minutes
February 21, 2012	022	Discute con Paolo	25.4	43 minutes
February 22, 2012	023	Damián besa a Elisa	26.3	43 minutes
February 23, 2012	024	Damián se va de nuevo	25.1	44 minutes
February 24, 2012	025	Ofensa	24.2	44 minutes
February 27, 2012	026	Intrigas	24.0	43 minutes
February 28, 2012	027	Conquista	24.0	44 minutes
February 29, 2012	028	Beso robado	25.1	43 minutes
March 1, 2012	029	Gabino pierde poder	25.3	43 minutes
March 2, 2012	030	Don Lucio jura venganza	24.2	43 minutes
March 5, 2012	031	Carmina descubre a Gabino	24.6	44 minutes
March 6, 2012	032	El plan de los Landuchi	24.1	44 minutes
March 7, 2012	033	Resultados de paternidad	25.6	44 minutes
March 8, 2012	034	Intenta besarla	25.3	43 minutes
March 9, 2012	035	Amuleto	24.0	43 minutes
March 12, 2012	036	Kenia ayuda a Florencia	25.7	43 minutes
March 13, 2012	037	Embarazo fingido	25.2	43 minutes
March 14, 2012	038	Cree que Elisa está embarazada	26.0	43 minutes
March 15, 2012	039	Florencia y Damián sufren un accidente	27.1	42 minutes
March 16, 2012	040	Falso embarazo	25.1	43 minutes
March 19, 2012	041	Gael descubre la verdad	24.3	44 minutes
March 20, 2012	042	Ingrid enfrenta a Alfonsina	25.5	42 minutes
March 21, 2012	043	Mentira descubierta	26.6	43 minutes
March 22, 2012	044	Ingrid revive el pasado	26.7	43 minutes
March 23, 2012	045	Quiere eliminar a Ingrid	24.9	41 minutes
March 26, 2012	046	La infidelidad de Edmundo	27.3	43 minutes
March 27, 2012	047	Kenia ofrece su ayuda	26.0	42 minutes
March 28, 2012	048	Elisa defenderá su amor	27.7	42 minutes
March 29, 2012	049	Gael se quiere ir	24.7	42 minutes
March 30, 2012	050	La carta de Paolo	24.0	42 minutes
April 2, 2012	051	Kenia cae inconsciente	22.6	42 minutes
April 3, 2012	052	El collar de Estefanía	24.9	42 minutes
April 4, 2012	053	Supuesta infidelidad	23.5	41 minutes
April 5, 2012	054	Boda repentina	19.8	42 minutes
April 6, 2012	055	En el registro civil	19.0	42 minutes
April 9, 2012	056	Damián en peligro de muerte	24.1	42 minutes
April 10, 2012	057	Donador	25.2	42 minutes
April 11, 2012	058	Vergonzoso descubrimiento	24.2	42 minutes
April 12, 2012	059	Para pagar la fianza	25.7	42 minutes
April 13, 2012	060	Elisa piensa desilusionar a Damián	24.4	42 minutes
April 16, 2012	061	Rara actitud	24.5	43 minutes
April 17, 2012	062	Elisa besa a Gael	26.6	42 minutes
April 18, 2012	063	Ojo por ojo	25.1	42 minutes
April 19, 2012	064	Despide a Gabino	25.7	41 minutes
April 20, 2012	065	Acepta ser novio de Paloma	23.4	41 minutes
April 23, 2012	066	Volver a querer	25.8	43 minutes
April 24, 2012	067	Posible reconciliación	25.7	43 minutes
April 25, 2012	068	Ya tomó una decisión	26.0	43 minutes
April 26, 2012	069	Fuerte discusión	26.1	43 minutes
April 27, 2012	070	Reclamo	24.7	43 minutes
April 30, 2012	071	Kenia descubre a Carmina	N/A	43 minutes
May 1, 2012	072	Alfonsina acusa a Carmina	24.9	43 minutes
May 2, 2012	073	Inculparán a Guido	25.1	43 minutes
May 3, 2012	074	Gabino y Paolo se unen	26.0	43 minutes
May 4, 2012	075	Mala espina	23.9	43 minutes
May 7, 2012	076	Damián estará a prueba	25.7	43 minutes
May 8, 2012	077	Asesino al descubierto	27.2	43 minutes
May 9, 2012	078	El engaño de Augusto	22.7	43 minutes
May 10, 2012	079	La Misma Sangre	21.7	43 minutes
May 11, 2012	080	Amenaza divina	23.4	42 minutes
May 14, 2012	081	Única condición	25.0	42 minutes
May 15, 2012	082	Deciden no verse más	26.4	43 minutes
May 16, 2012	083	Buen padre	27.0	43 minutes
May 17, 2012	084	Desagradable sorpresa	25.3	42 minutes
May 18, 2012	085	Muerte en el río	24.6	42 minutes
May 21, 2012	086	Augusto pide disculpas	25.9	42 minutes
May 22, 2012	087	Ramona habla con la verdad	27.5	42 minutes
May 23, 2012	088	Difamación	27.0	42 minutes
May 24, 2012	089	Elisa pierde a su padre	27.3	42 minutes
May 25, 2012	090	Necesita el apoyo de Damián	25.8	42 minutes
May 28, 2012	091	El presentimiento de Damián	27.5	42 minutes
May 29, 2012	092	No son hermanos	28.8	42 minutes
May 30, 2012	093	Paternidad sorpresiva	27.9	42 minutes
May 31, 2012	094	Elisa cachetea a Carmina	26.7	43 minutes
June 1, 2012	095	Traición	26.1	42 minutes
June 4, 2012	096	Intriga divina	27.5	42 minutes
June 5, 2012	097	Ambición y venganza	27.1	42 minutes
June 6, 2012	098	Lupe interroga a Horacio	28.7	42 minutes
June 7, 2012	099	Alfonsina en peligro	26.2	43 minutes
June 8, 2012	100	Protegerá a Sabrina	24.9	43 minutes
June 11, 2012	101	Paloma renuncia a Gael	25.8	43 minutes
June 12, 2012	102	La acusación de Alfonsina	24.6	42 minutes
June 13, 2012	103	Una relación con Gael	27.2	43 minutes
June 14, 2012	104	Amistad rota	26.5	42 minutes
June 15, 2012	105	Pretende ayudar a Elisa	25.5	43 minutes
June 18, 2012	106	Desilusión	26.3	43 minutes
June 19, 2012	107	Podría acusar a Gabino	27.5	43 minutes
June 20, 2012	108	Renuncia al plan de Florencia	26.8	43 minutes
June 21, 2012	109	Entre la vida y la muerte	27.3	43 minutes
June 22, 2012	110	Paolo está harto	25.1	42 minutes
June 25, 2012	111	Salvando el honor	26.2	42 minutes
June 26, 2012	112	Rompimiento familiar	25.7	42 minutes
June 27, 2012	113	Presunta culpable	27.7	42 minutes
June 28, 2012	114	Cancelar el contrato	26.4	42 minutes
June 29, 2012	115	Regresa Horacio	25.5	42 minutes
July 2, 2012	116	En secreto de confesión	26.1	42 minutes
July 3, 2012	117	La nueva competencia	27.1	42 minutes
July 4, 2012	118	Preguntas sobre el pasado	27.0	42 minutes
July 5, 2012	119	Villana contra villana	25.9	41 minutes
July 6, 2012	120	La mentira de Florencia	25.7	42 minutes
July 9, 2012	121	Pide la mano de Paloma	26.5	42 minutes
July 10, 2012	122	El hijo bastardo	N/A	42 minutes
July 11, 2012	123	Cerca de Gabino	26.6	42 minutes
July 12, 2012	124	Posponer la boda	26.8	41 minutes
July 13, 2012	125	Intrigas venenosas	N/A	42 minutes
July 16, 2012	126	Ingrid ya está casada	28.2	42 minutes
July 17, 2012	127	Un viejo secreto	26.6	42 minutes
July 18, 2012	128	Sospechas latentes	29.1	41 minutes
July 19, 2012	129	Remordimientos y venganza	27.0	42 minutes
July 20, 2012	130	Boda interrumpida	28.7	42 minutes
July 23, 2012	131	Violación	26.3	41 minutes
July 24, 2012	132	Paloma se va de La Ermita	26.5	42 minutes
July 25, 2012	133	Besos en la playa	27.3	42 minutes
July 26, 2012	134	Lo hará pagar	26.3	42 minutes
July 27, 2012	135	Regresan a La Ermita	25.1	41 minutes
July 30, 2012	136	Anillo de compromiso	26.0	42 minutes
July 31, 2012	137	Hermano contra hermano	27.0	42 minutes
August 1, 2012	138	Destino similar	26.3	42 minutes
August 2, 2012	139	Infidelidad confesada	28.2	42 minutes
August 3, 2012	140	Propietaria falsa	25.6	42 minutes
August 6, 2012	141	Carmina al descubierto	27.3	42 minutes
August 7, 2012	142	Destruir a Braulio	26.6	42 minutes
August 8, 2012	143	Responsabilidad aceptada	27.9	41 minutes
August 9, 2012	144	Intento de asesinato	27.8	42 minutes
August 10, 2012	145	Sospechan de Begoña	26.3	42 minutes
August 13, 2012	146	Ramo de novia	27.2	42 minutes
August 14, 2012	147	El testamento de Rosendo	27.2	42 minutes
August 15, 2012	148	Últimas palabras	27.0	42 minutes
August 16, 2012	149	Luto en el pueblo	27.9	42 minutes
August 17, 2012	150	Nueva sociedad	N/A	41 minutes
August 20, 2012	151	El culpable del incendio	N/A	42 minutes
August 21, 2012	152	Boletos falsos	29.5	42 minutes
August 22, 2012	153	Beso venenoso	27.9	41 minutes
August 23, 2012	154	Defenderá lo suyo	29.0	42 minutes
August 24, 2012	155	Alfonsina baja la guardia	26.6	42 minutes
August 27, 2012	156	Alianza por despecho	N/A	43 minutes
August 28, 2012	157	Desaparece de nuevo	29.8	43 minutes
August 29, 2012	158	Noche de bodas	29.4	43 minutes
August 30, 2012	159	Mordedura de serpiente	30.2	43 minutes
August 31, 2012	160	Amenazas	29.8	42 minutes
September 2, 2012	161	Gran Final Parte 1 Gran Final Parte 2	32.0	41 minutes 48 minutes
