= Me declaro culpable =

Mexican telenovela

- Genre: Telenovela
- Based on: Por amarte así by Martín Kweller and Gabriel Corrado
- Story by: Claudio Lacelli; Carolina Parmo
- Directed by: Sergio Cataño; Claudio Reyes Rubio; Luis Eduardo Reyes
- Starring: Daniela Castro; Mayrín Villanueva; Juan Soler; Juan Diego Covarrubias; Irina Baeva; Pedro Moreno; Sabine Moussier; Enrique Rocha
- Theme music composer: Jaime Flores; Luis Carlos Monroy
- Opening theme: "Me declaro culpable" by María José and Manuel Mijares
- Country of origin: Mexico
- Original language: Spanish
- No. of seasons: 1
- No. of episodes: 62

Production
- Executive producer: Angelli Nesma Medina
- Camera setup: Multi-camera

Original release
- Network: Las Estrellas
- Release: 6 November 2017 – 28 January 2018

Me declaro culpable (English: I Plead Guilty) is a Mexican telenovela that premiered on Las Estrellas on 6 November 2017 and ended on 28 January 2018.

It stars Daniela Castro, Mayrín Villanueva, and Juan Soler as main characters, with Juan Diego Covarrubias, Irina Baeva, Pedro Moreno, Sabine Moussier, and Enrique Rocha.

== Cast ==
=== Main ===
- Daniela Castro as Roberta Monroy de Urzúa
- Mayrín Villanueva as Alba Castillo
- Juan Soler as Franco Urzúa
- Juan Diego Covarrubias as Paolo Leiva Ruiz
- Irina Baeva as Natalia Urzúa
- Pedro Moreno as Julián Soberón
- Sabine Moussier as Ingrid Dueñas
- Enrique Rocha as Mauro Monroy
- Alejandro Ávila as Gael Ahumada
- Ramiro Fumazoni as Tiziano Castolo
- Alejandra García as Katia Romo
- Lisset as Bianca Olmedo
- Margarita Magaña as Julieta
- Amairani as Luciana
- Arlette Pacheco as Queta
- Alejandro Aragón as Raúl
- Ricardo Vera as Dr. Mendizabal
- Mariano Palacios as Dante
- Ramsés Alemán as Emanuel
- Bibelot Mansur as Celia
- Amanda Libertad as Olga
- Mikel Mateos as Gabriel
- Christian Vega as Pedro
- Marco Méndez as Javier

=== Special guest stars ===
- Miguel Herrera as Himself

== Production ==
The production of the series began on August 24, 2017. The series is produced for Televisa by Angelli Nesma Medina, based on the story written by Martín Kweller and Gabriel Corrado titled Por amarte así.

=== Casting ===
Angelique Boyer was initially contemplated to be part of the telenovela, but later it was announced that her exclusivity agreement with Televisa had ended, so Boyer decided to reject the project. After Boyer leaves the project it was confirmed that Irina Baeva and Juan Diego Covarrubias would be the young protagonists of the story. On August 15, 2017, People en Español magazine reported that Mayrín Villanueva would star in the telenovela. On August 29, 2017 it was confirmed that Daniela Castro and Juan Soler would be the main characters of the story. Both actors had already starred in a 1996 telenovela titled Cañaveral de pasiones.

== Episodes ==
No.	Title	Original release date	Mexico viewers (millions)
1	"Natalia atropella a Paolo"	6 November 2017	3.0
Natalia lives the worst nightmare of her life, while escaping from her boyfriend Julián, who drugged her with the intention of abusing her, runs over Paolo, a professional footballer, ending with what he always dreamed of, playing in Europe.
2	"Franco acepta la defensa de Alba"	7 November 2017	2.8
Upon learning that Alba lives unfairly behind bars to fulfill the last will of her husband, Franco agrees to defend her, is convinced to win the case and assures her that very soon she will be released from prison to be with her son again.
3	"Alba sale de la cárcel"	8 November 2017	3.0
Franco gives back her freedom to Alba and manages to show that she is being unjustly accused, since she disconnected Javier in an immense act of love.
4	"Alba se reencuentra con su hijo"	9 November 2017	3.2
After leaving prison, Alba looks for her son to give him the news, he agrees to talk to his mother, but Ingrid has the firm idea of staying with Gabriel and accusing Alba of kidnapping.
5	"Natalia sospecha que ella atropelló a Paolo"	10 November 2017	3.0
Paolo tells Natalia how he was run over, but everything coincides with the accident she provoked and suspects that she is to blame for his misfortune.
6	"Roberta intenta suicidarse"	13 November 2017	2.8
Roberta is heartbroken, she feels threatened by the closeness of Alba and Franco, so she suffers a new crisis believing that she is a hindrance and tries to take her own life.
7	"Alba no podrá estar cerca de Gabriel"	14 November 2017	3.1
Ingrid has the firm idea of staying with Gabriel and puts a trap on Alba to obtain a restraining order against her and prevent her from approaching her son.
8	"Ingrid cree que Alba y Franco son amantes"	15 November 2017	3.0
Ingrid follows Alba to her apartment where she sees her say goodbye to Franco and assumes that they are lovers, when she looks for Mauro to tell him what is happening, Roberta finds out.
9	"Franco se separa de Roberta"	16 November 2017	3.0
The marriage of Franco and Roberta over the years has deteriorated and turned into a relationship without love, so he decides to separate from his wife, at least for a while.
10	"Natalia intenta confesar su crimen"	17 November 2017	2.8
Natalia wants to confront what she did, and tell her father, but both Julián and Roberta prevent her, intimidating her with the fact that she will lose Franco's love.
11	"Natalia demuestra su amor por Paolo"	20 November 2017	2.8
Natalia prepares a romantic dinner for Paolo where she finally accepts the special thing that he is, because he has everything that she has always dreamed and can no longer hide that she is in love.
12	"Alba pierde la confianza en Franco"	21 November 2017	2.7
Roberta plans an intimate encounter between Alba and Franco, but Alba believes that it was him who provoked everything with the intention of taking her to bed.
13	"Ingrid pone a Gabriel en contra de Alba"	22 November 2017	2.7
Ingrid poisons Gabriel's mind by telling him that his dad had a chance to save his life, but Alba decided to take his life without thinking about them.
14	"Roberta intenta sobornar a Paolo"	23 November 2017	2.6
Roberta looks for Paolo to tell him that Natalia returned with Julian and offers him money in exchange for him completely leaving her life, Paolo rejects the proposal and refuses to believe that his relationship with Natalia ended.
15	"Katia regresa a la vida de Paolo"	24 November 2017	2.9
Katia does not give up, she is willing to fight to recover Paolo's love and asks him to give her a new opportunity to show her that she will never leave again.
16	"Roberta quiere matar a Alba"	27 November 2017	3.1
For Franco, Roberta is capable of everything and threatens to kill Alba by believing that she wants to destroy her family. Franco prevents the murder and promises Roberta that they will be given a new opportunity to save their marriage.
17	"Roberta le dice a Franco que está embarazada"	28 November 2017	2.8
After attacking Alba with the intention of killing her, Roberta is admitted to the psychiatric clinic and to prevent Franco from leaving her, makes him believe that she is pregnant.
18	"Ingrid se convierte en cómplice de Roberta"	29 November 2017	2.8
Ingrid arrives at the psychiatric clinic to visit Roberta and discovers that she has just killed Luciana, to prevent them from blaming Mauro's daughter for the crime, they causes a fire.
19	"Natalia y Paolo se dan una nueva oportunidad"	30 November 2017	2.9
Julián breaks up with Natalia and now that she is free, she decides to look for Paolo to ask her to forgive her and give her another chance, despite feeling afraid, Paolo accepts to try again.
20	"Roberta no acepta la relación de Natalia y Paolo"	1 December 2017	2.7
Natalia is sure of the love she feels for Paolo, but Roberta does not accept that relationship and tortures her saying that she has no future with Paolo and is only condemning her life.
21	"Alba enfrenta a Ingrid"	4 December 2017	2.5
Alba learns that Gabriel is in danger and seeks him to take him to live with her, they discover that Ingrid put his life in danger by drugging him to prevent them from fixing their problems.
22	"Roberta busca a Tiziano"	5 December 2017	3.0
Ingrid proposes to Roberta that she get a lover to become pregnant again and looks for Tiziano, a pretender of the past.
23	"Tiziano se reencuentra con Roberta"	6 December 2017	2.9
Titian does not forgive that Roberta has married Franco and his love is still alive despite the years, so he agrees to see her for an intimate encounter.
24	"Natalia y Paolo pasan la noche juntos"	7 December 2017	2.4
Paolo calls Natalia to give her the news that he recovered his wheelchair, she arrives at his apartment and decides to stay with him to show him that her love has no limits.
25	"Mauro presenta a Ingrid como su pareja"	8 December 2017	2.4
Mauro wants to formally introduce Ingrid to his family, he is convinced that she is the woman he needs and for that he organizes a dinner at home, but Roberta ruins the meeting.
26	"Tiziano descubre que Roberta lo usó"	11 December 2017	2.8
Roberta looks for Titian to sleep with him and follow her plans to get pregnant, but he confesses that he is sterile, despite knowing that he used it so that Franco does not abandon her, proposes that she divorce and return with him.
27	"Roberta intenta matar a su padre"	12 December 2017	2.8
Roberta accuses Mauro of being responsible for the death of her mother, blinded by the hatred tries to kill him, but Franco and Alba prevent her from committing a new crime.
28	"Alba descubre que Roberta tiene un amante"	13 December 2017	2.9
Tiziano is still interested in Roberta and while he reminded her that they are lovers, Alba finds them about to kiss.
29	"Roberta intenta suicidarse"	14 December 2017	2.5
Roberta surprises Alba in Franco's arms and tries to take her own life before seeing them together, but before she asks Franco to choose who he prefers.
30	"Natalia confiesa su crimen a Alba"	15 December 2017	2.8
Natalia can not continue to bear the guilt of having ruined Paolo's life and confesses to Alba that she was the one who hit him.
31	"Katia amenaza a Natalia"	18 December 2017	2.5
Katia asks Natalia to confess that she was the one who ran over Paolo, warns her that she will find the evidence that will blame her and will enjoy it when they put her in jail.
32	"Julián impide que Roberta asesine a Katia"	19 December 2017	2.8
Roberta knows that Katia is a threat to Natalia's freedom, forcing Julian to meet her in a hotel and when Roberta is about to kill her, Julian prevents it.
33	"Paolo termina con Natalia"	20 December 2017	2.4
Paolo believes that Natalia regretted marrying him and seeks her to ask them to separate, since their relationship can never work.
34	"Natalia decide confesar su culpa"	21 December 2017	2.2
Natalia makes the decision to seek Franco to confess his crime, but seeing that Paolo is there, decides to talk to the two, but Julian arrives to avoid once again that Natalia pleads guilty.
35	"Katia intenta atropellar a Natalia"	22 December 2017	2.1
Katia is ready for anything as long as Natalia surrenders to the authorities and once and for all confesses her crime, so she follows her and tries to overwhelm her with her car so that she feels for a moment what Paolo lived.
36	"Tiziano arruina el viaje de Alba y Franco"	25 December 2017	1.5
Tiziano learns that Alba and Franco planned a trip to the beach and makes them have a bad time, because he uses his influences to deny them lodging and they are forced to return to the City.
37	"Natalia se decepciona de Franco"	26 December 2017	2.4
Roberta gets Natalia to think that Franco was able to beat her and thanks to her intrigues, she manages to make the relationship between father and daughter come to an end.
38	"Franco descubre el chantaje de Julián"	27 December 2017	2.6
Franco tries to find out the truth and visits Rufino in prison, who accepts that Julian paid him to plead guilty to running over Paolo.
39	"Roberta se culpa de provocar el accidente de Paolo"	28 December 2017	2.7
Roberta tells Tiziano that Franco is looking for her to lock her in jail, because she was the one who ran over Paolo, so she paid a man to be blamed and pay for her crime but they are about to discover the truth, Tiziano assures her that he will help her.
40	"Tiziano hace creer que Rufino se suicidó"	29 December 2017	2.3
Titian would do anything for Roberta, and demonstrates it by killing the man who allegedly confessed against her, everything went perfectly, because they make believe that Rufino Santos could not stand the guilt and committed suicide in his cell.
41	"Julián está al borde de la muerte"	1 January 2018	2.1
After a new suicide attempt by Roberta, Julian tries to get her out of the car to avoid being hit by the train, but he is trapped and seriously injured.
42	"Ingrid y Roberta se unen para destruir a Alba"	2 January 2018	2.9
Alba is the worst enemy of Roberta and after learning that she is the daughter of Mauro, she agrees to join forces with Ingrid to destroy her and make her pay for everything she has done to them.
43	"Roberta regresa a la clínica psiquiátrica"	3 January 2018	2.8
Franco decides to intern Roberta in the psychiatric hospital, after a new suicide attempt, her life and that of others is in danger. Roberta resists and asks Tiziano for help, but he can not do anything and convinces her to cooperate.
44	"Natalia decide casarse con Julián"	4 January 2018	3.0
Julian pretends to be on the verge of dying to have Natalia in his hands, with Roberta's help he manipulates his feelings so that she decides to fulfill his last will and marry him.
45	"Franco no podrá seguir defendiendo a Alba"	5 January 2018	2.6
Mauro fulfills Roberta's order and convinces Franco not to continue defending Alba as they are sentimentally involved and Tiziano could use the information to win the trial.
46	"Franco impide la boda de Natalia"	8 January 2018	2.9
Franco prevents Natalia from making a mistake, convinces her that marrying Julián out of gratitude is not the right thing because she really loves Paolo.
47	"Natalia le suplica a Paolo que la perdone"	9 January 2018	2.7
After learning that Natalia did not get married, Paolo agrees to give her a new opportunity because he believes that she really is repentant and loves him.
48	"Franco se entera que Natalia atropelló a Paolo"	10 January 2018	2.8
Natalia no longer wants to continue lying and decides to confess that she destroyed the life of the man she loves the most, but Franco receives the video from Ingrid in which Alba confesses that Natalia ran over Paolo.
49	"Paolo se entera que Natalia lo atropelló"	11 January 2018	2.8
The guilt of Natalia in Paolo's accident is evidenced by a story in the newspaper, supposedly signed by Alba.
50	"Natalia se entrega a las autoridades"	12 January 2018	2.6
Natalia keeps her word and calls the police to surrender. In the middle of the scandal, the daughter of the prestigious lawyer Franco Urzúa is arrested and taken by authorities.
51	"Alba sufre por el secuestro de Gabriel"	15 January 2018	3.0
Roberta wished to see Alba suffer and she got it with the help of Tiziano, who ordered Gabriel to be kidnapped, when he found out that he was sick, he preferred to get rid of him and ordered that he be killed, but thanks to an operation, Alba's son was freed.
52	"Alba y Natalia se encuentran en prisión"	16 January 2018	3.3
Thanks to the cunning of Tiziano, Alba returns to the prison where she meets Natalia, who confesses that she is pregnant.
53	"Ingrid es sospechosa de causar la muerte de Javier"	17 January 2018	3.3
The day of the hearing of Alba arrived, a new witness compromises her freedom, but thanks to the defense of Franco and Gael, Ingrid becomes suspicious of causing the death of Javier.
54	"Roberta salva la vida de Franco"	18 January 2018	3.2
Franco signs the divorce petition, now it is Roberta's turn and Tiziano is responsible for forcing her to sign, otherwise she will give the order to kill Franco at that moment.
55	"Alba es apuñalada en la cárcel"	19 January 2018	3.2
After protecting Natalia again, Alba is attacked in prison by Tiziano's order, receives a stabbing that leaves her life in danger of death.
56	"Alba recupera su libertad"	22 January 2018	3.0
Alba manages to recover from the attack suffered in the prison and Franco is in charge of informing her that the judge gave the order to face her legal process in freedom, but when leaving, she finds out that Gabriel fled from Mauro's house.
57	"Roberta asesina a Franco"	23 January 2018	3.2
Julian shows Franco the video that shows that Roberta killed the only witness to Paolo's accident. Franco looks for Roberta with the intention of making her pay for her crime.
58	"Mauro protege la vida de Franco"	24 January 2018	3.2
Franco did not die, but due to the blows he suffers from amnesia and all the time he has remained under medical treatment.
59	"Paolo peleará la custodia de su hijo"	25 January 2018	3.5
Paolo is sure that the son that Natalia expects is his, but he will not allow him to grow up in prison and will fight to stay with him to form a family with Katia.
60	"Franco está decidido a recuperar el amor de Roberta"	26 January 2018	3.1
Franco can not remember anything of the last year of his life, while talking with Gael about the possibility of recovering Roberta's love, Alba listens to him and ends up with a broken heart.
61	"Natalia se casa con Julián"	28 January 2018	3.3
62	"Alba y Franco tienen la oportunidad de amar otra vez"	28 January 2018	3.3
Julián asks Natalia to marry him to prevent Paolo from taking her son, and she accepts the proposal. Paolo also wants to continue with his plans and marries Katia. Ingrid pleads guilty to causing the death of Javier, Roberta ends her life and there is no impediment for Alba and Franco to live their love with their children. Gabriel regains health thanks to Natalia, who lives happily with Paolo's forgiveness, the great love of her life.

== Ratings ==
Viewership and ratings per season of Me declaro culpable
Season	Episodes	First aired		Last aired		Avg. viewers (millions)
Season	Episodes	Date	Viewers (millions)	Date	Viewers (millions)	Avg. viewers (millions)
1	62	6 November 2017	3.0	28 January 2018	3.3	2.84

== Awards and nominations ==
Year	Award	Category	Nominated	Result
2018	TVyNovelas Awards	Best Telenovela of the Year	Angelli Nesma Medina	Nominated
2018	TVyNovelas Awards	Best Antagonist Actress	Daniela Castro	Won
2018	TVyNovelas Awards	Best Antagonist Actor	Pedro Moreno	Nominated
2018	TVyNovelas Awards	Best Leading Actor	Enrique Rocha	Nominated
2018	TVyNovelas Awards	Best Young Lead Actor	Juan Diego Covarrubias	Nominated
2018	TVyNovelas Awards	Best Original Story or Adaptation	Juan Carlos Alcalá, Rosa Salazar, and Fermín Zuñiga	Nominated
2018	TVyNovelas Awards	Best Direction	Sergio Cataño	Nominated
2018	TVyNovelas Awards	Best Direction of the Camaras	Alejandro Frutos	Nominated
2018	TVyNovelas Awards	Best Musical Theme	"Me declaro culpable" (Manuel Mijares and María José)	Nominated
2018	TVyNovelas Awards	Best Cast	Me declaro culpable	Nominated
