= Piel de otoño =

Mexican telenovela

- Genre: Telenovela; Romance; Drama
- Created by: Eric Vonn; Liliana Abud; Lindy Giacoman
- Written by: Martha Oláiz; Tania Bertrán; Antonio Abascal; Rossana Ruiz
- Directed by: Lily Garza; Mauricio Rodríguez
- Starring: Laura Flores; René Strickler; Sergio Goyri; Sabine Moussier; Raquel Olmedo
- Theme music composer: Kike Santander
- Opening theme: Esta ausencia by David Bisbal
- Country of origin: Mexico
- Original language: Spanish
- No. of episodes: 100 (Original version); 90 (International version)

Production
- Executive producer: Mapat L. de Zatarain
- Producer: Marco Vinicio López de Zatarain
- Production locations: Filming; Televisa San Ángel; Mexico City, Mexico; Locations; Mexico City, Mexico; Madrid, Spain
- Cinematography: Oscar Morales; Mauricio Manzano
- Camera setup: Multi-camera
- Running time: 41-44 minutes (Episodes 1-50, 71-100); 21-22 minutes (Episodes 51-70)
- Production company: Televisa

Original release
- Network: Canal de las Estrellas
- Release: May 9 – September 23, 2005

Related
- Inocente de Ti; El Amor no Tiene Precio; Cicatrices del alma (1986-1987)

Piel de otoño (International Title: Autumn Love) is a Mexican telenovela produced by Mapat L. de Zatarain for Televisa in 2005. Is a remake of the 1986 Mexican telenovela Cicatrices del alma.

On Monday, May 9, 2005, Canal de las Estrellas started broadcasting Piel de otoño weekdays at 5:00pm, replacing Inocente de Ti. The last episode was broadcast on Friday, September 23, 2005 with El Amor No Tiene Precio replacing it on Monday, September 26, 2005.

Laura Flores and René Strickler starred as protagonists, while Sergio Goyri, Sabine Moussier and Manuel Landeta starred as antagonists. Gerardo Murguía and María Marcela starred as stellar performances. Raquel Olmedo starred as special participation.

== Plot ==
With the love and unconditional support of his wife Lucía, Ramón Mendoza has progressed in his work to achieve an excellent economic position. Their two children, Liliana and Miguel Ángel, attend the best schools and never endured the shortages that their parents suffered at the beginning of their marriage.

However, Lucía isn't happy; Ramón has become materialistic and cruel. He constantly humiliates her and has made it so that their children have lost respect for her. Liliana, spoiled and capricious, goes as far as to follow her boyfriend to Spain, where the boy gets her pregnant and abandons her.

Hiding the secret of her maternity, Liliana leaves her daughter Natalia in the care of some nuns and returns to Mexico, where she must steal money from her father in order to care for the baby. Miguel Ángel, for his part, is a lazy and irresponsible boy who believes that he deserves everything.

Lucía has become a shadow, sad and doesn't know where her dreams have gone. Her only happy moments are when, alone before her computer, she opens her heart to a twin soul who understands her, advises her, and with whom, little by little and in silence, she has been falling in love — that mysterious man whose face she can only imagine, whose voice she hasn't heard, and signs his messages simply as "wind".

Her friend Rosario also carries a heavy cross. She had to flee with her children because her husband is a psychopath that beat her constantly. Eduardo and Gabriela don't remember how Víctor was in reality; Rosario let them believe that their father was a loving and responsible man who died when they were small.

This lie creates a rift between Rosario and her children when Víctor finds them. He wins the friendship of the young adults; Gabriela eventually leaves to live with him, and Rosario lives in a constant terror for her daughter's life.

The story of Triana is a story of love. Having left Spain three decades ago after discovering her husband with her best friend, she arrives in Mexico and meets Martín, with whom she lived for many years.

But after her beloved Martín's death, Triana finds out that she will be reunited with him when she is diagnosed with terminal cancer. When she receives the news that her husband in Spain has died and she's inherited his entire fortune, Triana laughs at the irony of fate.

Before dying, she makes her will and leaves Rosario her apartment in Mexico City and Lucía her inheritance in Spain. Rosario and Lucía feel great pain for the loss of their dear friend, and gratitude for her generosity.

One day, by coincidence, Lucía finds out that Liliana has a daughter, and wants to give her up for adoption. Lucía, who spent her childhood in an orphanage, will not allow her granddaughter to suffer as she did.

Determined, Lucía confronts Liliana, who refuses to admit the existence of the little girl. Lucía goes to Ramón to ask for his help, but she finds him with Rebeca, his lover.

Destroyed, Lucía receives the final blow when her son Miguel Ángel blames her for his break-up with his most recent conquest and stops talking to her. With a shattered soul and feeling that she is a hindrance for her family, she packs her things and goes to Spain to start a new life and try to find little Natalia.

In Spain she meets three of Triana's friends: Santiago, a distinguished painter, and Jordi and Mayte, who welcome her with care and offer her a home. Santiago and Lucía feel attracted to one another immediately, but, although her heart is consumed with love for Santiago, turns out to be "Wind", Lucía is still married and offers him her friendship.

In short time, Ramón asks for a divorce and annuls their marriage. Lucía is able to restart her life with Santiago and her love for him becomes stronger, which causes the love that she had for Ramón to dissolve. While Ramón's company collapses from debts and their children's lives sink further into vice and emptiness, Lucía transforms into a new, elegant woman who is sure of herself.

Lucía discovers her talent for finance upon becoming Mayte's associate and her fortune increases. Furthermore, her happiness is immense when, with Santiago's help, she finally finds Natalia.

Lucía knows that to be happy with Santiago, she must return to Mexico and confront her painful past. Only then can she leave behind her old memories and take control of her future.

The love that Santiago has shown her has reinvigorated her autumn skin, and love never arrives too late.

== Cast ==
- Laura Flores as Lucía Villareal Pérez de Mendoza
- René Strickler as Don Santiago Mestre
- Sergio Goyri as Don Ramón Mendoza
- Sabine Moussier as Rebeca Franco
- Raquel Olmedo as Triana Gallasteguí
- Gerardo Murguía as Gustavo Hellman
- María Marcela as Rosario Ruiz de Gutiérrez
- Manuel Landeta as Víctor Gutiérrez
- Alejandro Ávila as Bruno Dordelli
- Lourdes Reyes as Claudia Lambarí
- Andrea Torre as Gabriela "Gaby" Gutiérrez Ruíz
- Yolanda Ventura as Mayte Gómez de Samperio
- Jorge de Silva as Eduardo Gutiérrez Ruíz
- Florencia de Saracho as Liliana Mendoza Villarreal
- Agustín Arana as Pablo Castañeda
- Franco Gala as Miguel Ángel Mendoza Villarreal
- Arancha Gómez as Nora Berumen
- Luis Xavier as Jordi Sampeiro
- Carlos de la Mota as Diego
- Osvaldo Benavides as Damián
- Ramón Menéndez as Martín
- Francisco Avendaño as Luis
- Gabriela Rivero as Lucrecia Durán
- Ricardo Crespo as Juan Carlos
- Ricardo Margaleff as Edson
- Rosángela Balbó as Elvira Castañeda
- Susy-Lu Peña as Alexa Riveroll
- Archie Lanfranco as Dr. Silva
- Mónica Garza as Carmina Rubio
- Marco Muñoz as Lic. Alberto Díaz
- Paola Ochoa as Conchita Pérez
- Joana Brito as Jovita Muñoz
- Roberto Sen as Julián Bandera
- Sergio Jurado as Father René Ruiz
- Yousi Díaz as Cristina Miranda
- Luis Bayardo as Rodrigo
- Jorge Ortín as Rafael
- Roberto Miquel as Octavio Escalante
- Héctor del Puerto as Enrique
- Abraham Stavans as Arcadio
- Fernando Carrera as Jorge Poncela
- Juan Manuel Espadas as Héctor
- Patricia Romero as Jessica Rodríguez
- Óscar Alberto López as Rafa
- Adrián Ruiz as Eusebio Hurtado Juárez
- Claudia Troyo as Carmina
- Norma Iturbe as Nurse
- Jorge Peralta
- Mirta Renée
- Jose Maria Negri
- Javier Ruán
- Arturo Lorca
- Benjamín Islas
- Ricardo Vera

== Awards ==
Year	Award	Category	Nominee	Result
2006	24th TVyNovelas Awards	Best Actor	René Strickler	Nominated
2006	24th TVyNovelas Awards	Best Antagonist Actor	Sergio Goyri	Won
2006	24th TVyNovelas Awards	Best Leading Actress	Raquel Olmedo	Nominated
2006	24th TVyNovelas Awards	Best Musical Theme	Esta ausencia by David Bisbal	Nominated
2006	Premios Bravo	Best Antagonist Actor	Sergio Goyri	Won

== DVD release ==
Piel de otoño was released to region 1 DVD on 13 June 2006. The series was considerable abridged in order to fit onto the three double-sided DVD set, which contains 761 minutes of footage. In addition to bonus material, the release also features optional English subtitles.
