= Mi pecado =

Mexican telenovela

- Promotional poster
- Genre: Telenovela
- Created by: Cuauhtémoc Blanco; María del Carmen Peña; Víctor Manuel Medina
- Directed by: Jorge Fons; Aurelio Ávila
- Starring: Sergio Goyri; Daniela Castro; Sabine Moussier; Maite Perroni; Eugenio Siller
- Opening theme: "Mi pecado" by Maite Perroni and Reik "Cuál es mi pecado" by Fato and Elsa Ríos
- Country of origin: Mexico
- Original language: Spanish
- No. of episodes: 110

Production
- Executive producer: Juan Osorio Ortiz
- Production locations: San Cristóbal de las Casas, Chiapas, Mexico
- Running time: 41–44 minutes
- Production company: Televisa

Original release
- Network: Canal de las Estrellas
- Release: 15 June – 13 November 2009

Mi pecado (transl: My Sin; international title: Burden of Guilt) is a Mexican telenovela that was produced by Televisa and aired on Canal de las Estrellas from Monday, June 15, 2009, through Friday, November 13, 2009.

It stars Sergio Goyri, Daniela Castro and Sabine Moussier, along with Maite Perroni and Eugenio Siller in the lead roles.

== Plot ==
Paulino Córdoba, Gabino Roura, Rodolfo Huerta, and Matías Quiroga have been friends since childhood, but as adults, their priorities changed, and a sin threatens to destroy their friendship.

Paulino owns the "El Milagro" apple orchard and is married to Rosario. They have two children, César and Lucrecia. Rosario has always shown a preference for her son and an open rejection of her daughter. Lucrecia was raised by Delfina, Rosario's maid and Manuel's mother.

Lucrecia and Manuel consider themselves milk siblings because Delfina breastfed them. Lucrecia's best friend is Julián Huerta. They share the same tastes and a sensitivity that, over the years, blossoms into a great love.

Gabino Roura is a cunning and ambitious man who murders his wife, Inés, to seize her fortune. Gabino manipulates his friends and his children, Carmelo and Teresa. He owns the best farmland, which he rents to Paulino, allowing him to control the distribution and sale of the apples.

Rodolfo is the schoolteacher in the town of San Pedro. He is an upright and hardworking man. He is married to Justina, a sensual woman who is dissatisfied with how little her husband provides. They are the parents of Julián and Josué. Justina Almada, Rodolfo's wife, is the one who sparks serious conflicts that threaten to destroy the friendship between Rodolfo, Paulino, and Gabino.

Matías Quiroga, the town priest, watches with anguish as his friends become enemies and the main obstacle to Lucrecia and Julián's love. Unfortunately for both of them, fate leads them to be involved in an accident that takes César's life. And although they are innocent, Rosario believes they are responsible.

Depression overwhelms Rosario, who cannot bear the presence of her daughter. Rosario's resentment forces Paulino to remove his daughter from "El Milagro" and distance himself from Rodolfo Huerta's family. From then on, Julián's bad reputation spreads throughout the town, and from there arises the nickname "El Chamuco" (The Devil), which he will have to bear for the rest of his life.

As the years pass, Julián and Lucrecia reunite and their love is rekindled, but their parents oppose it. They are determined to fight for their love. They have the support of Delfina, Modesto (her husband), and the solidarity of Manuel, who, despite loving Lucrecia, helps them find happiness. Modesto, the foreman of "El Milagro," is a country man who owns a small plot of corn and, along with Delfina and Manuel, forms a close-knit and loving family.

Lucrecia doesn't return alone; she is accompanied by Renata, her cousin, an envious young woman determined to take everything that belongs to Lucrecia. Paulino is facing financial hardship, and Gabino demands he marry Lucrecia. But Carmelo intervenes and kills his father. Julián is unjustly accused of the crime, forcing Lucrecia to marry Carmelo to prevent her father's ruin and to avoid a false accusation against Julián. Julián leaves town, convinced that Lucrecia betrayed him.

Lucrecia lives in sorrow as Carmelo's wife, having also lost the “El Milagro” ranch. The townspeople talk about the arrival of a stranger who bought "El Milagro". Lucrecia discovers that the stranger is Julián Huerta... Carmelo learns of Julián's return, and a war erupts between them for Lucrecia's love.

== Cast ==
=== Main ===
- Sergio Goyri as Gabino Roura
- Daniela Castro as Rosario Pedraza de Córdoba
- Sabine Moussier as Justina Almada de Huerta
- Maite Perroni as Lucrecia Córdoba Pedraza
- Eugenio Siller as Julián Huerta Almada

=== Recurring ===
- Francisco Gattorno as Rodolfo Huerta
- Roberto Blandón as Paulino Córdoba
- Armando Araiza as Carmelo Roura Valdivia
- Jessica Coch as Renata Valencia
- Ricardo Franco as Miguel
- Úrsula Prats as Matilde
- Antonio Medellín as Modesto Flores
- Tina Romero as Asunción Torres
- Magda Karina as Delfina Solís
- Dacia Arcaráz as Irene Valenzuela
- Rafael Goyri as Simón Méndez
- Sergio Reynoso as Ernesto Mendizábal
- Claudio Báez as Luciano Ordorica
- Jackie García as Blanca Quiroga
- Gabriela Carrillo as Teresa Roura Valdivia
- Altaír Jarabo as Lorena Mendizábal
- María Prado as Rita López
- Amparo Garrido as Socorro
- Diego Amozurrutia as Josué Huerta Almada
- Aldo Gallardo as Manuel Solís
- Claudia Cervantes as Toña
- Gilberto de Anda as Fidel Cruz
- Daniela Aedo as Child Lucrecia Córdoba Pedraza
- Adriano as Child Julián Huerta Almada
- Robín Vega as Child Josué Huerta Almada
- Diego Velázquez as César Córdoba Pedraza
- Alejandro Cervantes as Child Manuel Solís
- Salvador Sánchez as Father Matías Quiroga

=== Guest star ===
- Lucía Méndez as Inés Valdivia de Roura

== Production ==
=== Casting ===
Actor Valentino Lanús was originally attached to the role of Julián Huerta Almada opposite of Maite Perroni. With Lanús still attached to the role, producer Juan Osorio Ortiz offered the role of Julián's mother, Justina Almada de Huerta, to Sabine Moussier, but she turned down the offer, feeling that, at 42, she was too young to play the mother of then-33-year-old Lanús, who had played her love interest in Amar sin límites three years earlier. Actress Joana Benedek, only three years older than Lanús, was instead cast as Justina. However, Lanús eventually backed out of the role, citing a heavy workload as impeding his participation. The role was then recast with Eugenio Siller, then 28, and Moussier replaced Benedek as Justina.

Additionally, the role of Rodolfo Huerta was originally to have been filled by Ernesto Laguardia. However, the actor, who also served as host on the television program Hoy, did not receive permission from Hoy producer Roberto Romagnoli to take time off to film the telenovela, so he was replaced with Francisco Gattorno.

Towards the end of the filming of the soap opera, actress Sabine Moussier was diagnosed with Guillain–Barré syndrome and was forced to alter her shooting schedule on Mi pecado in order to promote her recovery. According to Osorio, Moussier's illness traveled from her spinal cord to her brain, affecting her ability to remember her lines and causing her severe pain. As a result of her worsening health, Moussier was forced to leave the cast of Mi pecado shortly before the completion of filming. Moussier's character, Justina, was not recast, as Osorio had planned for the possibility of her departure and filmed her final scenes in advance.

=== Broadcast history ===
Mi pecado premiered on Televisa's El Canal de las Estrellas on Monday, June 15, 2009, at 6:00 PM, replacing En nombre del amor. The program aired weeknights, and, as a result of its success, was moved to the 7:00 PM time slot on Monday, July 27, 2009, replacing Verano de amor while ceding its former time to Camaleones. Mi pecado ran for a total of 110 episodes, with its finale airing on Friday, November 13, 2009; it was replaced by Mar de amor. From March 8 to August 6, 2010 Univision broadcast Mi pecado weeknights at 7pm/6c replacing En nombre del amor. The last episode was broadcast on August 6, 2010 with Llena de amor replacing it.

== Awards and nominations ==
Year	Association	Category	Nominee(s)	Result
2009	TV Adicto Golen Awards			
2009	TV Adicto Golen Awards	Best Actress in a Supporting Role	Sabine Moussier	Won
2009	TV Adicto Golen Awards	Best Male Villain	Sergio Goyri	Won
2009	TV Adicto Golen Awards	Best Female Villain	Daniela Castro	Won
2009	TV Adicto Golen Awards	Best Female Lead	Maite Perroni	Won
2009	TV Adicto Golen Awards	Best Original Story	Mi pecado	Won
2009	TV Adicto Golen Awards	Best Mexican Telenovela	Mi pecado	Won
2010	People en Español Awards			
2010	People en Español Awards	Best Telenovela	Mi pecado	Nominated
2010	People en Español Awards	Best Actress	Maite Perroni	Nominated
2010	People en Español Awards	Best Actor	Eugenio Siller	Nominated
2010	People en Español Awards	Best Female or Male Villain	Daniela Castro	Won
2010	People en Español Awards	Best Female or Male Villain	Sabine Moussier	Nominated
2010	People en Español Awards	Best Female or Male Villain	Sergio Goyri	Nominated
2010	People en Español Awards	Best Young Lead Actress or Actor	Eugenio Siller	Won
2010	People en Español Awards	Best Young Lead Actress or Actor	Maite Perroni	Nominated
2010	People en Español Awards	Best Couple	Maite Perroni; Eugenio Siller	Nominated
2010	TVyNovelas Awards			
2010	TVyNovelas Awards	Best Telenovela	Juan Osorio Ortiz	Nominated
2010	TVyNovelas Awards	Best Leading Actress	Daniela Castro	Nominated
2010	TVyNovelas Awards	Best Leading Actor	Sergio Goyri	Nominated
2010	TVyNovelas Awards	Best Young Lead Actress	Maite Perroni	Nominated
2010	TVyNovelas Awards	Best Female Revelation	Gabriela Carrillo	Nominated
2010	TVyNovelas Awards	Best Male Revelation	Diego Amozurrutia	Nominated
2010	TVyNovelas Awards	Best Original Story or Adaptation	Cuauhtémoc Blanco; María del Carmen Peña; Víctor Manuel Medina	Won
2010	TVyNovelas Awards	Best Direction	Jorge Fons; Aurelio Ávila	Nominated
2010	Bravo Awards			
2010	Bravo Awards	Best Antagonist Actress	Daniela Castro	Won
2010	Bravo Awards	Best Antagonist Actor	Armando Araiza	Won
2011	Latin ACE Awards			
2011	Latin ACE Awards	Best Supporting Actress	Daniela Castro	Won
2011	Latin ACE Awards	Best Supporting Actor	Armando Araiza	Won
