= René Strickler =

Argentine actor

- Born: René Guillermo Strickler Zender; October 20, 1962 (age 62); Córdoba, Argentina
- Occupation: Actor
- Spouse: Patricia Rangel (m. 2010)
- Children: Andrick and Yanick

René Strickler (born October 20, 1962) is an Argentine actor.

== Telenovelas ==
Year	Telenovela	Role	Notes
1997	Alguna vez tendremos alas	Ignacio Nacho Nájera/Domingo	Supporting Role
1997/98	Sin ti	Luis David Luján	Protagonist
1998/99	El privilegio de amar	Víctor Manuel Duval Rivera	Protagonist
2000	Ramona	Felipe Moreno Gonzaga	Antagonist / Protagonist
2001	Mujer bonita	José Enrique	Protagonist
2001	Amigas y rivales	Carlos Torreblanca	Supporting Role
2003	De pocas, pocas pulgas	Adrián de Lastra	Supporting Role
2003/04	Mariana de la noche	Dr. Camilo Guerrero	Supporting Role
2004	Piel de otoño	Santiago Mestre	Protagonist
2005	Sueños y Caramelos	Rafael Monraz	Protagonist
2006	Mundo de Fieras	Edgar Farías	Supporting Role
2006/07	Amar sin límites	Mauricio Duarte	Antagonist
2007	Destilando Amor	Dr. Alonso Santoveña	Supporting Role
2007/08	Tormenta en el Paraiso	Hernán Lazcano	Special Guest
2008/09	Cuidado con el Angel	Omar Contreras/Leopardo	Supporting Role
2009/10	Atrevete a Soñar	Rodrigo Peralta Jiménez	Protagonist
2010/11	Para Volver a Amar	Patricio González	Protagonist
2012	Amor Bravío	Mariano Albarrán	Supporting Role
2013	Corazón indomable	Miguel Narvaez	Antagonist
2014	El Color de la Pasión	Alonso Gaxiola	Co Protagonist
2014	La sombra del pasado	Raymundo Alcocer	Special Guest
2015	Que te perdone Dios	Dr. Patricio Duarte	Supporting Role
2016	Un camino hacia el destino	Luis Alberto Montero Nuñez	Main Antagonist
2017	El vuelo de la victoria	Clemente Mendieta	Co Protagonist
2019/20	Soltero con hijas	Juventino "Juve" Del Paso	Co Protagonist

== Show hosting ==
- TVyNovelas Awards 2005 (2005)
- Oye Awards 2004 (2004) (TV)
