= Que te perdone Dios =

2015 Mexican telenovela

- Genre: Telenovela
- Created by: Juan Carlos Alcalá
- Based on: Abrázame muy fuerte by René Muñoz and Liliana Abud
- Developed by: Rosa Salazar; Fermín Zúñiga; Jorge Cervantes
- Written by: Rossana Ruiz
- Story by: Caridad Bravo Adams
- Directed by: Claudio Reyes Rubio; Sergio Cataño
- Creative director: Denise Camargo
- Starring: Zuria Vega; Mark Tacher; Sergio Goyri; Rebecca Jones
- Theme music composer: Jorge Eduardo Murguía Pedraza; Mauricio Arriaga
- Opening theme: "Aunque ahora estés con él" performed by Calibre 50
- Country of origin: Mexico
- Original language: Spanish
- No. of episodes: 123

Production
- Executive producer: Angelli Nesma Medina
- Producer: Ignacio Alarcón
- Cinematography: Manuel Barajas; Armando Zafra
- Editors: Octavio López Reyes; Daniel Rentería Carmona
- Camera setup: Multi-camera
- Production company: Televisa

Original release
- Network: Univision
- Release: January 19 – July 10, 2015

Related
- Pecado mortal

Que te perdone Dios... yo no (English title: Ask God for Forgiveness... Not Me) is a Mexican telenovela produced by Angelli Nesma Medina for Televisa. It is the remake of the telenovela Abrázame muy fuerte, produced in 2000.

Starring Zuria Vega, Mark Tacher, Sergio Goyri and Rebecca Jones.

== Television film ==
On July 18, 2015, Televisa confirmed that the soap opera would have a one-hour special episode, which debuted on July 25, 2015, under the title of ¡La historia que pudo haber sido!.

== Plot ==
Renata Flores del Ángel (Irán Castillo / Rebecca Jones) is a beautiful young woman raised under the harshness of her father, Don Bruno (Don Éric del Castillo), an important exporter of grapes and wines from a town called Real de San Andrés. Don Bruno always wanted to have a son and for that reason he rejects his daughter.

Renata finds love in Pablo (Brandon Peniche), a worker on her father's estate, but their love is discovered by Don Bruno, who does not accept this relationship and in his anger goes so far as to try to kill Pablo. Faced with Don Bruno's harassment, Pablo decides to flee the estate and asks Renata, who is pregnant, to accompany him.

Don Bruno prevents Renata from running away with Pablo and, upon learning that she is pregnant, takes her to Ciudad del Valle to hide her pregnancy, accompanied by Macaria (Alejandra García / Sabine Moussier), an ambitious employee, whom Don Bruno buys to take care of Renata and so that when the baby is born she registers it in her name and passes it off as her own. Renata gives birth to a girl, Abigail, and, obeying her father, gives her to Macaria.

Don Bruno forces Renata to marry Fausto López (Sergio Goyri), the owner of a nearby ranch, who is full of debts and sees this marriage as a solution to his economic problems.

Over time, Abigail (Zuria Vega), daughter of Renata and Pablo, turns into an attractive young woman, who meets Mateo (Mark Tacher), Fausto's nephew. A strong attraction arises between the two youngsters that leads them to fall in love.

== Cast ==
=== Main ===
- Zuria Vega as Abigail Ríos
- Mark Tacher as Mateo López Guerra
- Sergio Goyri as Fausto López Guerra
- Rebecca Jones as Renata Flores del Ángel

=== Recurring and guest stars ===
- Sabine Moussier as Macaria Ríos
- María Sorté as Helena Fuentes
- René Strickler as Dr. Patricio Duarte
- Ana Bertha Espín as Constanza del Ángel
- Ferdinando Valencia as Diego Muñoz
- Alejandro Ávila as Lucio Ramírez
- Manuel Ojeda as Melitón
- Laisha Wilkins as Ximena / Daniela Negrete
- Dacia González as Vicenta Muñoz
- Zaide Silvia Gutiérrez as Simona Sánchez
- Ana Patricia Rojo as Efigenia de la Cruz y Ferreira
- Fabián Robles as Julio Acosta / Julián Montero
- Irán Castillo as Young Renata
- Don Éric del Castillo as Bruno Flores Riquelme
- Brandon Peniche as Pablo Ramos
- Alejandra Ávalos as Mía Montero
- Moisés Arizmendi as Porfirio
- Antonio Medellín as Father Francisco
- Alejandra García as Young Macaria
- Alejandra Procuna as Eduviges de la Cruz y Ferreira
- Raúl Olivo as Motor
- Óscar Bonfiglio as Marcelino
- Julio Mannino as Benito
- Myrrha Saavedra as Amanda Ríos
- Héctor Saez as Commander Barragán
- Carlos Athié as Max
- Adriano as Antonio Sánchez (Toño)
- Santiago Hernández as Alfredo Sánchez (Freddy)
- Rafael Amador as Barman
- José María Galeano as Father Tomás
- Iván Caraza as Mano Negra
- Alejandra Robles Gil as Teodora
- Daniela Basso as Juanita
- Lakshmi Picazo as Nieves
- Altaír Jarabo as Diana Montero

== Ratings ==
=== Univision rating ===
Que te perdone Dios... yo no premiered in the United States on January 19, 2015 on Univision with a total of 3.0 million viewers.

=== Mexico rating ===
In Mexico, it premiered on February 16, 2015 on Las Estrellas with a total of 19.2 viewers.

Timeslot (ET/PT)	No. of episodes	Premiered		Ended	
Timeslot (ET/PT)	No. of episodes	Date	Premiere Ratings	Date	Finale Ratings
Monday to Friday 7:15PM	116	February 16, 2015	19.2	July 26, 2015	19.1

== Soundtrack ==
No.	Title	Artist(s)	Length
1.	"Aunque ahora estés con él"	Calibre 50
2.	"Contigo"	Calibre 50
3.	"Mi mujer"	Ernesto D'Alessio

== Awards and nominations ==
Year	Award	Category	Recipients and nominees	Outcome
2015	Presea Luminaria de Oro	Recognition for Performance	Ana Patricia Rojo	Won
2015	Juventud Awards	Favorite Female Protagonist	Zuria Vega	Nominated
2015	Juventud Awards	Favorite Male Protagonist	Mark Tacher	Nominated
2015	Juventud Awards	Best Telenovela Theme	"Aunque ahora estés con él" by Calibre 50	Won
2016	Juventud Awards	Favorite Female Protagonist	Zuria Vega	Nominated
2016	Juventud Awards	Favorite Male Protagonist	Sergio Goyri	Nominated
2016	Juventud Awards	Best Telenovela Theme	"Aunque ahora estés con él" by Calibre 50	Nominated
2016	TVyNovelas Awards	Best Actress	Zuria Vega	Nominated
2016	TVyNovelas Awards	Best Antagonist Actor	Alejandro Ávila	Nominated
2016	TVyNovelas Awards	Best Leading Actress	Ana Bertha Espín	Nominated
2016	TVyNovelas Awards	Best Young Lead Actress	Alejandra García	Nominated
2016	TVyNovelas Awards	Best Young Lead Actor	Brandon Peniche	Won

== Broadcast ==
The series originally aired from January 19, 2015 to July 10, 2015 on Univision. Subsequently, it aired on Canal de las Estrellas from February 16, 2015 until July 27, 2015.
