= Daniela Castro =

Mexican actress and singer (born 1969)

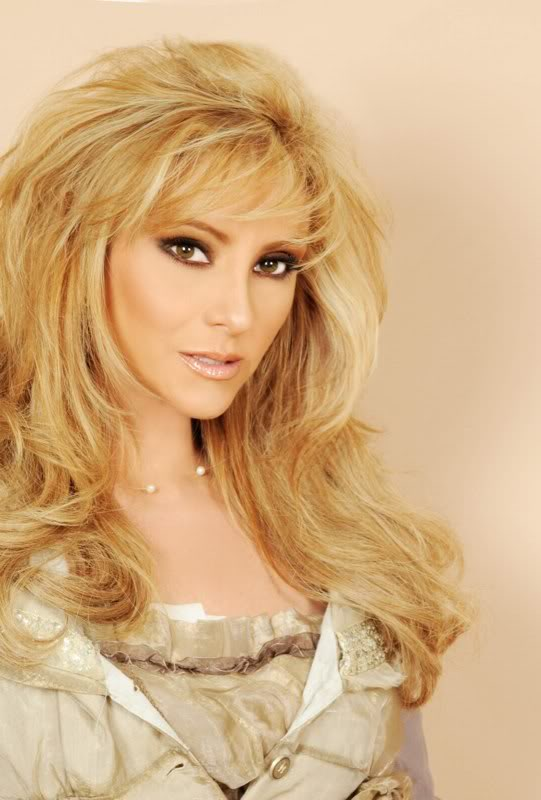
- Castro in 1999
- Born: Danielle Stefani Castro Arellano; 17 August 1969 (age 57); Mexico City, Mexico
- Occupations: Actress, singer
- Years active: 1988–present
- Spouse: Gustavo Díaz Ordaz Borja
- Children: 3

Daniela Castro (born Danielle Stefani Castro Arellano; 17 August 1969) is a Mexican actress and singer.

== Biography ==
She felt an attraction for music at a very young age, and this is why she entered the Centro de Estudios Artísticos de Televisa (CEA), which took her in another direction. She ended up performing in plays at some theaters in Mexico, which she continued doing occasionally. She was offered a role in a telenovela because of her success in the theatre. She has starred in 13 telenovelas to date. After a long absence from television, she returned to play Lizabeta in Pasión in 2007. She also played the main role (as Rosa) in one of the episodes of Mujeres Asesinas.

Also, she acted in Mi Pecado where she played Rosario, her greatest antagonist to date. She considers Cadenas de Amargura the telenovela that brought her the success and recognition that made her the actress she is today. This novela was not a big production and did not have a big cast, but the story and episodes were already written; and the characters were perfectly defined which is considered the main reason for the success of Cadenas de Amargura. Diana Bracho (who is considered one of the best actresses in Mexico) was part of the cast. Raul Araiza who played her boyfriend in the story was also her boyfriend in real life. Cynthia Klitbo, Delia Casanova, Fernando Luján, Alexis Ayala, and Raymundo Capetillo also participated in this story.

Daniela plays Cecila Vizcaino, a young girl whose parents die in a tragic accident. Cecila is sent to her aunt's house after her parents' death. Evangelina who is a very possessive, moral, and religious person who wants to control her life, prevents her from committing sin and living her life on her own terms. On the other hand, her aunt Natalia (Delia Casanova) is good to her and is the one that protects her. Daniela plays a very timid, quiet girl, who tries to fight for her right to live her life her way, trusts her aunts without knowing all the pain one of them is causing her.

Cañaveral de Pasiones is a novel written by Caridad Bravo Adams. The story was produced by Humberto Zurita and Christian Bach who have only delivered well- made stories. Daniela plays Julia Santos, a very sensual role compared to Cadenas de Amargura. Juan Soler is the lead actor and plays Pablo Montero.

The story is about two families: the Santos and the Monteros. Because of some misunderstandings, Pablo's mother Joséfina, played by Angelica Aragón, believes Julia's mother Margarita (Felicia Mercado), who happened to be one of the most beautiful woman in town, is the lover of her husband Amador (César Évora). However, she is mistaken, the one that is her husband's lover is Dinorah (Azela Robinson), Margarita's sister and Julia's aunt. In order to prevent her sister from running away with Amador, Margarita goes to meet him, and they end up having an accident during a rain storm, and subsequently dying, reason enough for Josefina to think she is right; and she tries to make Julia's life miserable. She prevents Pablo from seeing her and sends him to the Capital to study. As an adult and engaged to be married, Pablo returns home. Although engaged, he sees Julia again and falls in love with her all over again. They will have to fight for their love against Josefina, Dinorah, and Julia's Father Fausto (Leonardo Daniel).

After a long absence she returned in the telenovela Pasión, which is situated around 1780 in the New Spain. She plays blind Lizabeta de Salamanca; the difference here is that she plays the antagonist. At first, she was afraid to play this role, but she subsequently earned positive reviews. She also starred in a horror movie called Viaje directo al infierno in 1989.

In addition, she recorded an album called Junto a ti. She has mentioned that her biggest dream was to perform a song with her father (Jorge) for her mother. She planned to record a second album with her uncles and her dad; but her uncle suddenly died. Because of the respect and love she had for her father, the project has been delayed.

== Discography ==
- Desencuentro (1998)
- Junto A Ti (1999)

== Filmography ==
=== Films ===
| Year | Title | Role | Notes |
|---|---|---|---|
| 1986 | Navidad con cachunes | | Documentary short |
| 1989 | Viaje directo al infierno | María | |
| 1991 | Infamia | | |
| 1993 | Sueño y Realidad | Alejandra | |

=== Television ===
| Year | Title | Role | Notes |
|---|---|---|---|
| 1981 | Cachún cachún ra ra! | Debbie | |
| 1988 | Un nuevo amanecer | Patricia | Lead role |
| 1989 | Mi segunda madre | Mónica | Lead role |
| 1989 | Balada por un amor | Simona Portugal | Lead role |
| 1990 | Días sin luna | Lorena | Lead role |
| 1991 | Cadenas de amargura | Cecilia Vizcaíno | Lead role |
| 1992 | Triángulo | Sara | Lead role |
| 1996 | Mujer, casos de la vida real | Various roles | Episode: "El amor, siempre es el amor" |
| 1996 | Cañaveral de pasiones | Julia Santos | Lead role |
| 1997-1998 | Desencuentro | Victoria | Lead role |
| 2001 | El noveno mandamiento | Isabel Durán / Ana Jiménez | Lead role |
| 2007-2008 | Pasión | Lisabeta de Salamanca | Main cast |
| 2009 | Mujeres asesinas | Rosa Domínguez | "Rosa, heredera" (Season 2, Episode 5) |
| 2009 | Mi pecado | Rosario Pedraza de Córdoba | Main cast; 110 episodes |
| 2011-2012 | Una familia con suerte | Josefina Arteaga de Irabién | Main cast |
| 2013-2014 | Lo que la vida me robó | Graciela Giacinti de Mendoza / Gaudencia Jimenez | Main cast/ Antagonist |
| 2017-2018 | Me declaro culpable | Roberta Monroy de Urzúa | Main cast |
| 2024 | Top Chef VIP | Herself | Contestant; season 3 |
| 2025 | Cautiva por amor | Isabel Fuentes Mansilla | Main role |

== Awards and nominations ==
=== Premios TVyNovelas ===
| Year | Category | Telenovela | Result |
|---|---|---|---|
| 1989 | Mejor actriz debutante | Nuevo Amanecer | Won |
| 1990 | Best Young Lead Actress | Mi Segunda Madre | Nominated |
| 1991 | Best Young Lead Actress | Dias sin Luna | Nominated |
| 1992 | Best Young Lead Actress | Cadenas de Amargura | Won |
| 1997 | Best Lead Actress | Cañaveral de Pasiones | Won |
| 2008 | Best Female Antagonist | Pasión | Nominated |
| 2010 | Best First Actress | Mi Pecado | Nominated |
| 2015 | Best Female Antagonist | Lo que la vida me robó | Won |
| 2018 | Best Female Antagonist | Me declaro culpable | Won |

=== Premios Bravo ===
| Year | Category | Series/Telenovela | Result |
|---|---|---|---|
| 2007 | Best Female Performance | Mujer, casos de la vida real | Won |
| 2010 | Best Female Antagonist | Mi Pecado | Won |

=== Premios ACE (Argentina) ===
| Year | Category | Telenovela | Result |
|---|---|---|---|
| 2011 | Best Female Co-acting | Mi Pecado | Won |

=== Premios People en Español ===
| Year | Category | Telenovela | Result |
|---|---|---|---|
| 2011 | Best Female Antagonist | Mi Pecado | Won |
| 2012 | Best Female Antagonist | Una Familia Con Suerte | Nominated |
