= Amor sin maquillaje =

- Created by: Alejandro Pohlenz; Salvador Garcini
- Directed by: Salvador Garcini; Rodrigo Zaunbos; Gustavo Rodríguez
- Starring: Marlene Favela; Sergio Goyri; Lucía Méndez; Carmen Montejo; Sabine Moussier
- Country of origin: Mexico
- Original language: Spanish
- No. of episodes: 25

Production
- Executive producer: Rosy Ocampo
- Producer: Eduardo Meza
- Cinematography: Manuel Ángel Barajas; Alejandro Álvarez Ceniceros
- Running time: 60 minutes
- Production company: Televisa

Original release
- Network: Canal de las Estrellas
- Release: September 17 – October 19, 2007

Amor sin maquillaje (Love Without Makeup) is a Mexican telenovela produced by Rosy Ocampo for Televisa, in tribute to the 50th anniversary of the creation of telenovelas in Mexico. It stars Marlene Favela, Sergio Goyri, Lucía Méndez and Carmen Montejo.

== Synopsis ==
Pina is a makeup artist who lives with her grandmother and mother, who were also makeup artists, in Mexico City ever since she was widowed with her four-year-old son. She dreams of becoming a telenovela writer and in her spare time studies at Televisa's Writers' Center while writing her first telenovela, "Amor oculto" (Hidden Love). She falls in love with Héctor Ibarra, a very popular but arrogant and cruel actor who asks Pina to go with him to Miami. She refuses, so Héctor steals her telenovela script and registers it under his name. Pina stays in Mexico, pregnant with Héctor's child and deeply hurt by his betrayal. When Héctor returns to star in "Amor oculto", Pina is hired as a makeup artist on the same telenovela she wrote.

On the other hand, there is Lupita, Pina's mother, who was abandoned by her husband when Pina was a child and who returns 20 years later to ask Lupita for forgiveness, only to discover that another man is in her life and she will have to choose between them.

Verónica, Pina's grandmother, is a makeup artist who reminisces about her years at Televisa doing makeup and her shared experiences with actors working on telenovelas.

== Cast ==
=== Main ===
- Marlene Favela as Pina
- Sergio Goyri as Héctor
- Lucía Méndez as Lupita
- Carmen Montejo as Verónica
- Sabine Moussier as Beatriz
- Enrique Rocha as Rafael
- Joan Sebastian as Alex
- Helena Rojo as Inés
- César Évora as Pedro
- Daniela Romo as Fernanda
- Nora Salinas as Adriana
- Alejandro Ibarra as Valentín
- Alicia Machado as Marina
- Catherine Papile as Claudia
- Gabriela Goldsmith as Elena
- Alma Muriel as judge
- Benjamin Islas as doctor

=== Special appearances ===
- Aarón Hernán
- Adriana Roel
- Aida Pierce
- Alejandra Barros
- Alejandra Meyer
- Alejandro Ávila
- Alejandro Ruiz
- Alfonso Iturralde
- Ana Martín
- Angélica María
- Antonio Medellín
- Carla Estrada
- Carlos Bracho
- Cecilia Romo
- Cynthia Klitbo
- Claudio Baez
- Conrado Osorio
- Diana Golden
- Enrique Lizalde
- Eric Guecha
- Erika Buenfil
- Ernesto Laguardia
- Fernando Robles
- Gastón Tuset
- Gerardo Murguía
- Héctor Gómez
- Ignacio López Tarso
- Jacqueline Andere
- Jacqueline Voltaire
- Joaquín Cordero
- José Luis Reséndez
- Juan José Origel
- Juan Verduzco
- Julio Alemán
- Lili Garza
- Lorena Enríquez
- Luis Bayardo
- Luis Couturier
- Mara Patricia Castañeda
- María Rubio
- Otto Sirgo
- Patricia Navidad
- Raquel Garza
- Raúl Padilla "Chóforo"
- Ricardo Blume
- Rogelio Guerra
- Sharis Cid
- Sherlyn
- Silvia Pinal
- Verónica Castro
- Xavier Marc
- Yadhira Carrillo

== Production ==
Televisa conceived Amor sin maquillaje as the first project in its celebration of 50 years of telenovela in Mexico. The project was headed by Jorge Eduardo Murgia and Ricardo Pérez Teuffer, with Rosy Ocampo as producer. It was also intended as a posthumous tribute to the actor and producer Ernesto Alonso. The story was designed around five decades of Mexican telenovela production from 1957 onwards. Ocampo said it would refer to earlier productions such as Senda prohibida and include archive footage of past telenovelas. The production team said that the series would show the work of people who usually stay behind the scenes, such as technical staff, producers, and makeup artists.

The series marked Lucía Méndez's return to Televisa after 17 years. Several veteran telenovela artists appeared in brief cameos.

Filming of the telenovela began on 13 August 2007 and wrapped on 13 October 2007. The telenovela premiered on Canal de las Estrellas on 17 September 2007 in the 6 pm time slot.

== Critical reception ==
Miriam Giglio of People en Español opined that Amor sin maquillaje included a variety of telenovela clichés, stereotypical characters, exaggerated acting, and dialogue that seemed amateurish. The review noted that the premise of the story resembled the 1978 telenovela Pecado de amor. Giglio felt that the series redeemed itself by making extensive use of archive scenes from five decades of telenovelas.

Milly Cangiano of Primera Hora also criticized the writing of the telenovela by stating, "Amor sin maquillaje becomes monotonous and boring. I was hoping that to celebrate 50 years of telenovelas they would do something more glamorous, but from what we've seen, it's more of the same, with repetitive dialogue, long scenes, and worst of all, a great cast that they don't take advantage of".
