= Sin ti (TV series) =

- Genre: Telenovela; Romance; Drama
- Created by: Inés Rodena
- Written by: Gabriela Ortigoza; Esther Alicia Cabrera; Ricardo Fiallega; Juan Carlos Tejeda
- Directed by: Luis Eduardo Reyes; Marta Luna
- Starring: Gabriela Rivero; René Strickler; Adamari López; Roberto Vander; Saby Kamalich
- Theme music composer: Franco De Vita
- Opening theme: "Vuelve" by Ricky Martin
- Country of origin: Mexico
- Original language: Spanish
- No. of episodes: 77

Production
- Executive producer: Angelli Nesma Medina
- Producer: María de Jesús Arellano
- Production locations: Filming; Televisa San Ángel; Mexico City, Mexico
- Cinematography: Gilberto Macín; Alberto Rodríguez; Roberto Zamora Soldevilla
- Running time: 41-44 minutes (episodes 1-65); 21-22 minutes (episodes 66-90)
- Production company: Televisa

Original release
- Network: Canal de las Estrellas
- Release: December 8, 1997 – April 10, 1998

Related
- Raquel (1972); Verónica (1980); Herencia maldita (1986); Abigail (1988); Luisa Fernanda (1998)

Sin ti (English title: Without you) is a Mexican telenovela produced by Angelli Nesma Medina for Televisa in 1997. This telenovela based on 1980 Mexican telenovela Verónica.

On December 8, 1997, Canal de las Estrellas started broadcasting Sin ti weekdays at 4:30pm, replacing Volver a Empezar. The last episode was broadcast on April 10, 1998, with Una luz en el camino replacing it the following Monday. In the United States, it aired on Univision from April 6, 1998 to July 23, 1998.

Gabriela Rivero and Rene Strickler starred as protagonists, while Adamari López and Roberto Vander starred as antagonists.

== Cast ==
- Gabriela Rivero as Sagrario Molina
- René Strickler as Luis David Luján
- Adamari López as María Elena Ysaguirre
- Roberto Vander as Guillermo Ysaguirre
- Saby Kamalich as Dolores Vda. de Luján
- Irán Eory as Mercedes
- Diana Golden as Elena de Ysaguirre
- Consuelo Duval as Gloria
- Raúl Magaña as Mauricio
- Gabriela Goldsmith as Prudencia
- Francesca Guillén as Sandra
- Germán Gutiérrez as César
- Renée Varsi as Abril
- Lourdes Reyes as Ángeles Rubio-Castillo
- Isabel Andrade as Crescencia
- Vanessa Angers as Leonor Molina
- Rosita Bouchot as Irene
- Rebeca Mankita as Katy
- Marina Marín as Lía
- Evangelina Martínez as Gertrudis
- Justo Martínez as Dr. Juárez
- Servando Manzetti as Nicolás Rubio-Castillo
- Carlos Bracho as Félix Guzmán
- Mercedes Molto as Brenda
- Carlos Monden as Professor Prado
- Polly as Aurelia
- Adriana Rojo as Professor Rojo
- Myrrah Saavedra as Evelia
- Ariadne Welter as Tomasa
- Fernando Sáenz as Mateo
- Sergio Sánchez as Amadeo
- Yadira Santana as Angustias Durán de Rubio-Castillo
- Ricardo Vera as Lic. Gómez
- Liza Willert as Professor Torres
- Luis Maya as Pablito
- Montserrat de León as Lupita
- Priscilla Greco as Ana
- Marco Antonio Calvillo as Baltazar
- Gustavo Rojo as Don Nicolás "Nico" Rubio-Castillo
- Julio Mannino as Beto
- Héctor Sánchez as Eduardo
- Bertha del Castillo as Dr. Zepeda
- Rodolfo Lago as Obregón
