= Sabine Moussier =

Mexican actress (born 1966)

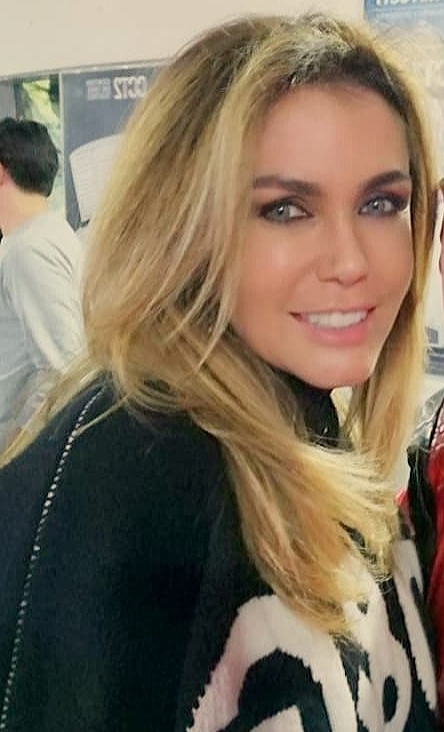
- Born: Diana Sabine Moussier; July 12, 1966 (age 59); Leverkusen, North Rhine-Westphalia, West Germany
- Occupation: Actress
- Years active: 1996–present
- Children: 2

Diana Sabine Moussier (Spanish pronunciation: [saˈβine muˈsjeɾ]; born on July 12, 1968) is a Mexican actress who is best known for her villainous roles in Televisa's telenovelas, such as María Isabel, El privilegio de amar, Entre el amor y el odio, La madrastra, Amar sin límites, Piel de otoño, Amor sin maquillaje, Las tontas no van al cielo, Mi pecado, Abismo de pasión, La malquerida, Que te perdone Dios, Sueño de amor, Me declaro culpable and Perdona nuestros pecados. She starred as the protagonist in Ni contigo ni sin ti.

== Biography ==
Diana Sabine Moussier was born on July 12, 1966, in Leverkusen, North Rhine-Westphalia, West Germany. Her mother was from Sinaloa, Mexico, and her father was from Mexico City. During her pregnancy, her mother temporarily moved to Germany. Shortly after her birth, both returned to Mazatlán, Sinaloa, where Moussier grew up. Throughout her childhood and youth, her mother made her believe that her real name was Diana Sabine Kronz Moussier, based on a fake birth certificate. Additionally, she told her that her father was a German man whom she had separated from due to circumstances related to the Berlin Wall.

=== Career ===
Soon after graduating from CEA, Moussier found work as the co-host of Al ritmo de la noche with Jorge Ortiz de Pinedo. In 1996, she was cast in minor roles in Morir dos veces and Luz Clarita. The following year, Moussier portrayed the pianist Mireya Serrano in María Isabel.

Moussier's recognition increased in 1998 when she was cast in El privilegio de amar as the sympathetic model Lorenza Torres, which some have referred to as Moussier's best role yet. Moussier later won the award for Best New Actress at the 1999 Premios TVyNovelas ceremony for her portrayal of Lorenza. That same year, she took on the role of the adulterous Diana de Lizárraga in Mujeres engañadas, alongside Arturo Peniche.

In 2001, Moussier joined the cast of El derecho de nacer (a remake of the 1981 telenovela) as Graciela, a seemingly demure secretary who, disguised as a nun, frequents Yucatec brothels in order to satisfy not only her clients' base desires, but her own as well. The following year, she starred alongside César Évora and Susana González in Entre el amor y el odio, in which she portrayed the scheming Frida, the series' primary villainess, who plots alongside the odious Marcial (Alberto Estrella) to marry Évora's Octavio and gain control of his family's lands.

Following the August 2002 finale of Entre el amor y el odio, Moussier took a two-and-a-half-year hiatus from her career in order to give birth to, and care for, her newborn daughter. In February 2005, Moussier starred as Évora's ex-fiancée in La madrastra as the vain and haughty murder suspect Fabiola de Mendizábal, a character with hints of mental instability who nonetheless redeems herself by the novela's end and winds up happy with her equally suspicious husband, Bruno (René Casados). Three months later, she debuted in Piel de otoño as ambitious businesswoman Rebeca Franco, who carries on an affair with the heroine's villainous husband Ramón (Sergio Goyri).

After finishing Piel de otoño, Moussier took part in the theatrical play Hombres. After giving birth to her second child, she returned to telenovelas late in 2006 as mafia boss Eva Santoro in Amar sin límites. The role marked a change for Moussier, as Eva Santoro was neither an unfaithful wife, nor a husband-stealer, nor a terrible mother. Despite her evil deeds, Eva became a popular character with the viewing audience, who came to view her more favorably than series heroine Azul (Karyme Lozano) and lamented her death. For her work as Eva, Moussier was nominated at the 2007 Premios TVyNovelas for Best Actress in her antagonistic role. She briefly reunited with the cast of La madrastra and took up the role of Fabiola in order to re-film the final ten episodes of the telenovela, which was being re-aired at the time, and to provide a new resolution to the murder mystery. She joined the star-studded cast of the mini-novela Amor sin maquillaje as Beatriz, pairing up with Piel de otoño co-star Sergio Goyri. The telenovela honored the fiftieth anniversary of Televisa and telenovelas in Mexico.

In 2008, Moussier starred as Marissa in Las tontas no van al cielo, a character with which the actress professed to be enamored. Marissa becomes a more sympathetic character after it is revealed that she was forced to have an unwanted abortion at the age of 15 and after her fiancé Santiago (Jaime Camil) leaves her pregnant at the altar for her friend, Candy (Jacqueline Bracamontes). However, much to Moussier's dismay, After wrapping up the filming of Las tontas, Moussier replaced Edith González as the protagonist, Elena Tejero, in the musical play Aventurera, though she withdrew from the cast a few months later following a leg injury.

In 2009, Moussier starred as the seductive, social-climbing Justina Almada de Huerta in Mi pecado. During the filming of Mi pecado, Moussier was diagnosed with Guillain–Barré syndrome. Though she and producer Juan Osorio Ortiz initially altered her filming schedule in order to accommodate her recovery, she was forced to withdraw from the cast shortly before the finale. Her character, Justina, was not recast, as Osorio had planned in advance for the possibility of Moussier's departure.

In 2011, she returned to Mexican telenovelas after she was diagnosed with Guillain–Barré syndrome, starring in her first protagonist role as Eleonor Cortazar in Ni contigo ni sin ti. In March 2012, Moussier starred as the seductive, vain, haughty, ambitious, villainously, social-climbing and scheming Carmina Bouvier in Abismo de pasión, a remake of Cañaveral de Pasiones. Her character is mentally unstable, who nonetheless redeems herself. In 2013, she participated in Amores verdaderos as Bruna Cristo in a special appearance. In 2014, Moussier starred as the antagonist role of Perla in La malquerida. In 2015, Moussier starred as the main antagonist Macaria, a seductive, hypocritical and cruel servant in Que te perdone Dios (a remake of 2000 telenovela Abrázame muy fuerte).

For her contributions to television, Moussier's handprints were embedded onto the Paseo de las Luminarias in 2022.

=== Personal life ===
In 1999, Moussier began dating Rodrigo Santos, and though they moved in together, the couple split in 2002 after two-and-a-half years together. Moussier started a relationship with Chilean businessman Jorge Peralta, and the couple's daughter, Camila Peralta Moussier, was born on July 15, 2003, in Mexico City. They later welcomed their son, Paulo Peralta Moussier, on July 3, 2006. Moussier and Peralta subsequently split in January 2008, publicly announcing their separation a month later on February 19. Although Moussier often referred to Peralta as her husband, Peralta himself told gossip magazine TVnotas that the couple was never officially married. However, because Moussier and Peralta had cohabited for more than five years and had children together, they were required, under the Mexican Constitution, to formally divorce nonetheless. Shortly after breaking up with Peralta, Moussier began dating a young man named Juan, but they ended their relationship in 2009.

In April 2009, Moussier became involved in a public and lengthy war of words with fellow actress Sherlyn, who brought a lawsuit against Moussier's former partner Peralta, accusing him of defrauding her of MXN$2 million while they were dating. Moussier paid Peralta's debt herself and then publicly denounced Sherlyn when the younger actress did not immediately drop the charges against Peralta. Peralta was eventually released from prison on May 14, but Moussier later accused Sherlyn of violating the non-aggression pact that was included in the settlement of the lawsuit and threatened to reveal information that would ruin Sherlyn's career. The two actresses eventually came to an understanding following a telephone call and subsequently called a truce.

In late 2009, Moussier developed Guillain–Barré syndrome and was forced to alter her shooting schedule on Mi pecado in order to promote her recovery. According to Juan Osorio, Moussier's illness traveled from her spinal cord to her brain, affecting her ability to remember her lines and causing her such pain that doctors were forced to put her under sedation. Additionally, he claimed that Moussier might be left paralyzed as a result of the illness. As a result of her worsening health, Moussier was forced to leave the cast of Mi pecado shortly before the completion of filming. Moussier announced in late November 2009 that her health was improving and that she would not be left paralyzed, although she stressed that Guillain–Barré "is an illness that takes months [from which to recover]". Although she had recovered from Guillain–Barré by March 2010, her health has been further complicated by a diagnosis of chronic fatigue syndrome.

== Filmography ==
Year	Title	Role	Notes
1996	Morir dos veces	Paullette	Recurring Role
1996-1997	Luz Clarita		Guest role
1997-1998	María Isabel	Mireya Serrano	Recurring role
1998-1999	El privilegio de amar	Lorenza Torres	Main cast
1999	Rosalinda	Cristina	Guest role
1999-2000	Mujeres engañadas	Diana Solórzano de Lizárraga	Main role
2001	El derecho de nacer	Graciela	Recurring role
2002	Entre el amor y el odio	Frida Díaz de Villareal "Dama de la Corte"	Main cast
2005	La madrastra	Fabiola Morán de Mendizábal	Main cast
2005	Piel de otoño	Rebeca Franco	Main cast
2006-2007	Amar sin límites	Eva Santoro	Main cast
2007	Amor sin maquillaje	Beatriz	Main cast
2008	Las tontas no van al cielo	Marissa de la Parra	Main cast
2009	Mi pecado	Justina Aldama de Huerta	Main cast
2011	Ni contigo ni sin ti	Eleonor Cortázar Armenta	Main cast
2012	Abismo de pasión	Carmina Bouvier de Castañón	Main cast
2013	Amores verdaderos	Bruna Cristo	Guest role
2014	La malquerida	Edelmira Pérez López / Perla	Main cast
2015	Que te perdone Dios	Macaria Rios	Main cast
2016	Sueño de amor	Tracy Kidman de Alegria	Main cast
2017-2018	Me declaro culpable	Ingrid Dueñas López	Main cast
2019-2020	Médicos	Sandra	Guest role
2020-2021	La mexicana y el güero	Olinka Cohen	Main cast
2022	Corazón guerrero	Victoriana Peñalver	Main cast
2022-24	Secretos de Villanas	Herself	Main cast
2023	Perdona nuestros pecados	Ángela Bulnes de Montero	Main cast
2023	Bola de locos	Herself	Episode: "Atrevida despedida"
2024	La casa de los famosos México	Herself	Houseguest (season 2)

== Theater ==
Year	Title	Role	Notes
2005	Hombres		
2008	Aventurera	Elena Tejero	Lead Role

== Awards and nominations ==
=== TVyNovelas Awards ===
Year	Category	Telenovela	Result
1999	Best Female Revelation	El privilegio de amar	Won
2007	Best Female Antagonist	Amar sin límites	Nominated
2013	Best Female Antagonist	Abismo de pasión	Nominated
2017	Best Female Antagonist	Sueño de amor	Nominated

=== Premios ACE (Argentina) ===
Year	Category	Telenovela	Result
2006	Outstanding Character Actress	La madrastra	Won
