= Alejandro Ávila =

Mexican actor (born 1973)

- Born: Alejandro Aranda Ávila; November 24, 1973 (age 52); Guadalajara, Jalisco, Mexico
- Occupations: Actor, singer
- Years active: 1988–present

Alejandro Ávila (born Alejandro Aranda Ávila on November 24, 1973) is a Mexican telenovela actor.

== Biography ==
His birth name is Alejandro Aranda and his artistic name was chosen to honor his stepfather.

== Filmography ==
=== Films ===
Year	Title	Role	Notes
1990	La ley de la mafia	Hampón #3	
1990	El estrangulador de la rosa	Padrote 2	
1991	La verdadera historia de Barman y Droguin	Periodista	
1991	La leona		Video
1991	La rata		
1993	La niña de Izamal		Short film
2006	La prometida	Alexis Orlock	Television film

=== Television ===
Year	Title	Role	Notes
1988	Crònica negra	Homenàs 1	"La mala companyia" (Season 1, episode 9)
1995	Lazos de amor		Guest star
1995	El premio mayor		Guest star
1996	Marisol	Castello	Supporting role
1996	La culpa	Judicial	Guest star
1996	Tú y yo	Young Tomás Santillana	Guest star
1996	La sombra del otro	Benito	Supporting role
1997	Esmeralda	Diseñador	Guest star
1997-2006	Mujer, casos de la vida real	Entrenador	
1998	Rencor apasionado	Alejandro	Supporting role
1999	Rosalinda	Gerardo Navarette	Guest star
1999	Amor Gitano		Guest star
1999	Infierno en el paraíso	Felipe	Supporting role
2000	El precio de tu amor	Fabián San Miguel	Supporting role
2001	Amigas y rivales	Sebastián	Supporting role
2002	La Otra	Román Guillen	Supporting role
2003	De pocas, pocas pulgas	Lorenzo Valverde	Supporting role
2005	Piel de otoño	Bruno Dordelli	Supporting role
2005	El Amor no Tiene Precio	Dr. Arnaldo Herrera	Supporting role
2005	Vecinos	Federico	
2006	Duelo de pasiones	Orlando Villaseñor	Supporting role
2006	Amar sin límites	Mario López	Supporting role
2007	Pasión	Juancho	Supporting role
2007	Amor sin maquillaje		Guest star
2007	Tormenta en el paraíso		Guest star
2008	La rosa de Guadalupe	Luis	
2008-2009	Juro que te amo	Mariano Lazcano	Main role
2008-2009	Mujeres asesinas	José	
2009	Tiempo final	Felipe / Daniel	
2009	Los simuladores	Marcelo	TV series
2009-2010	Corazón salvaje	Dr. Pablo Miranda	Supporting role
2010	Locas de amor		
2010	XY. La revista	Fernando Arístides	3 episodes
2010-2011	Teresa	Cutberto González	Supporting role
2011	Como dice el dicho	Fernando Arístides	
2011	El Equipo	Carrasco	
2011	Ni contigo ni sin ti	Alex	Guest star
2011-2012	La que no podía amar	Ernesto	Supporting role
2012	Abismo de pasión	Doctor Manrique	Guest star
2012	Milagros		
2012	Corona de lágrimas	Baldomero	Guest star
2012-2013	Porque el amor manda	Fernando Rivadeneira	Supporting role
2013-2014	Lo que la vida me robó	Víctor Hernandez	Supporting role
2015	Que te perdone Dios	Lucio Ramirez	Supporting role
2016	Corazón que miente	Rogelio Medina Sánchez	Supporting role
2016	Vino el amor	Marcos Muñoz Pérez	Guest star
2017	Mi adorable maldición	Camilo Espinosa	Supporting role
2018	La bella y las bestias	Enrique León	Guest star
2019-2021	El Dragón: Return of a Warrior	Unknown Role	Guest star
2020	Vencer el miedo	David Cifuentes	Supporting role
2020	Como tú no hay 2	German Muñoz	Supporting role
2021-2022	Parientes a la fuerza	Tenoch	Supporting role
2023-2024	El maleficio	Joel Núñez	Supporting role
2024	El Conde: Amor y honor	Guillermo "Memo" Garza	Supporting role
2024-2025	Amor amargo	Guillermo San José	Supporting role
2025	Doménica Montero	Gabriel Cadena Ruiz	Supporting role
2026	Tan cerca de ti, nace el amor	Facundo Cervera	Supporting role

== Awards and nominations ==
Year	Category	Telenovela	Result
2009	Premios TVyNovelas – Best Lead Actor	Juro Que Te Amo	Nominated
2014	Premios TVyNovelas – Best Co-Star Actor	Porque El Amor Manda	Nominated
2016	Premios TvyNovelas – Mejor Actor Antagonico	Que Te Perdone Dios	Nominated
