= Abismo de pasión =

2012 Mexican telenovela

- Genre: Telenovela; Drama; Romance
- Created by: Caridad Bravo Adams
- Based on: Cañaveral de pasiones by María del Carmen Peña and José Antonio Olvera
- Developed by: Rosa Salazar; Fermín Zúñiga
- Written by: Juan Carlos Alcalá
- Directed by: Claudio Reyes Rubio; Sergio Cataño
- Starring: Alejandro Camacho; Blanca Guerra; Angelique Boyer; David Zepeda; Mark Tacher; Sabine Moussier; Ludwika Paleta; César Évora; Altaír Jarabo; Salvador Zerboni; Eugenia Cauduro; Francisco Gattorno; Alexis Ayala
- Theme music composer: Eduardo Murguía Pedraza; Mauricio Arriaga
- Opening theme: "Solo un suspiro" by Óscar Cruz and Alejandra Orozco
- Country of origin: Mexico
- Original language: Spanish
- No. of episodes: 161 (list of episodes)

Production
- Executive producer: Angelli Nesma Medina
- Producer: Ignacio Alarcón
- Production locations: La Ermita; Mérida, Yucatán; Cenote; Mexico City; Televisa San Ángel (filming)
- Cinematography: Jorge Amaya Rodríguez; Manuel Barajas; Armando Zafra
- Editors: Octavio López Reyes; Daniel Rentería Carmona; Alfredo Juárez Gutiérrez
- Running time: 41–44 minutes
- Production company: Televisa

Original release
- Network: Canal de las Estrellas
- Release: January 23 – September 2, 2012

Abismo de pasión (English: Abyss of Passion) is a Mexican telenovela produced by Angelli Nesma Medina for Televisa. It is a remake of the 1996 telenovela Cañaveral de pasiones, based on an adaptation by María del Carmen Peña and José Antonio Olvera of an original story by Caridad Bravo Adams. The series aired on Canal de las Estrellas from January 23 to September 2, 2012. The finale was followed by a special program where the cast discussed their experience working on the show.

The plot follows childhood friends Elisa (Angelique Boyer), Damián (David Zepeda) and Gael (Mark Tacher) as they reunite as adults after their families were torn apart by a scandal. Alejandro Camacho, Blanca Guerra, Sabine Moussier, Ludwika Paleta, César Évora, Altaír Jarabo, Salvador Zerboni, Eugenia Cauduro, Francisco Gattorno and Alexis Ayala also star.

In the United States, it aired on Univision weeknights at 9 pm EST from March 12 to November 7, 2012.

== Plot ==
Abyss of Passion takes place in the town of La Ermita, located on Mexico's Yucatán Peninsula. Elisa (Briggitte Bozzo / Angelique Boyer) is the daughter of Augusto Castañón (Alejandro Camacho) and Estefanía Bouvier de Castañón (Ludwika Paleta). She is the best friend of Damián (Robin Vega / David Zepeda), the son of Rosendo (César Évora) and Alfonsina Arango (Blanca Guerra). The kids also hang out with Gael (Diego Velázquez / Mark Tacher) and Paloma (Mariliz León / Livia Brito), two orphaned children from lower-class backgrounds.

Also living in Elisa's house is Carmina (Sabine Moussier), Estefanía's sister, a twisted woman who has been secretly in love with her brother-in-law for years. Due to his indifference, Carmina has had no qualms about becoming romantically involved with Rosendo, even though he is a married man. When Estefanía discovers the relationship between the two and that Rosendo intends to abandon his family to run away with her sister, she goes to the place where they were supposed to meet in order to try to change his mind. A fight between the two culminates in a tragic car accident that costs them both their lives. This misunderstanding, coupled with the silence of the perverse Carmina, leads the entire town to assume that Estefanía and Rosendo were lovers. Resentment drives Augusto to fall into alcoholism and marry Carmina without love, while Alfonsina's rage causes her to send her son to study abroad to separate him from Elisa, whom she has irrationally hated ever since for being the daughter of the woman she blames for her husband's death.

Years later, Damián returns to town engaged to Florencia Landucci (Altaír Jarabo), a self-interested and frivolous girl who is only after his money. Upon reuniting with Elisa, they both realize they have not forgotten each other and that the childhood friendship that once united them has now blossomed into a mature and mutual love. But this feeling will be forbidden, mainly due to the enmity between their respective families. Furthermore, Gael, their childhood friend, has also set his sights on Elisa over the years, unconscious of the feelings Paloma has harbored for him. A rivalry for Elisa's love will soon develop between Damián and Gael, who are unaware of their familial relationship.

== Cast ==
=== Main ===
- Alejandro Camacho as Augusto Castañón
- Blanca Guerra as Alfonsina Arango
- Angelique Boyer as Elisa Castañón
- David Zepeda as Damián Arango
- Mark Tacher as Gael Arango
- Sabine Moussier as Carmina Bouvier
- Ludwika Paleta as Estefanía Bouvier
- César Évora as Rosendo Arango
- Altaír Jarabo as Florencia Landucci
- Salvador Zerboni as Gabino Mendoza
- Eugenia Cauduro as Dolores
- Francisco Gattorno as Braulio
- Alexis Ayala as Edmundo Tovar

=== Recurring and guest stars ===
- Livia Brito as Paloma González
- Eric del Castillo as Lucio Elizondo
- Raquel Olmedo as Ramona González
- Nailea Norvind as Begoña
- Armando Araiza as Horacio
- Isaura Espinoza as Maru
- Dacia González as Blanca Elizondo
- Sergio Mayer as Paolo Landucci
- Isabella Camil as Íngrid Navarro
- Vanessa Arias as Antonia
- Alberto Agnesi as Enrique Tovar
- Ricardo Dalmacci as Guido Landucci
- Esmeralda Pimentel as Kenia
- Jade Fraser as Sabrina Tovar
- Adriano as Vicente
- Briggitte Bozzo as Child Elisa
- Robin Vega as Child Damián
- Diego Velázquez as Child Gael
- Mariliz León as Child Paloma
- René Casados as Father Guadalupe

== Production ==
Production of Abismo de pasión officially started on November 14, 2011 and took place in and around Yucatán.

== Reception ==
Univision's November 5, 2012 finale broadcast of Abismo de pasión averaged 5.4 million viewers.

== Awards and nominations ==
Year	Award	Category	Nominee(s)	Result	Ref.
2012	Copa Televisa	Telenovela of the Year	Angelli Nesma Medina	Won	
2012	Kids' Choice Awards Mexico	Favorite Actress	Angelique Boyer	Nominated	
2012	Juventud Awards	Girl of my Dreams	Angelique Boyer	Nominated	
2012	Juventud Awards	What a Hottie!	David Zepeda	Won	
2012	People en Español Awards	Best Telenovela	Abismo de pasión	Nominated	
2012	People en Español Awards	Best Actress	Angelique Boyer	Nominated	
2012	People en Español Awards	Best Actor	David Zepeda	Nominated	
2012	People en Español Awards	Best Supporting Actress	Blanca Guerra	Nominated	
2012	People en Español Awards	Best Supporting Actor	Mark Tacher	Nominated	
2012	People en Español Awards	Best Female Villain	Sabine Moussier	Nominated	
2012	People en Español Awards	Best Male Villain	Sergio Mayer	Nominated	
2012	People en Español Awards	Couple of the Year	Angelique Boyer; David Zepeda	Nominated	
2012	TV Adicto Golden Awards	Best Leading Actor	René Casados	Won	
2012	TV Adicto Golden Awards	Best National Locations	Abismo de pasión	Won	
2012	TV Adicto Golden Awards	Best Direction of the Cameras	Abismo de pasión	Won	
2013	TVyNovelas Awards	Best Telenovela	Angelli Nesma Medina	Nominated	
2013	TVyNovelas Awards	Best Actress	Angelique Boyer	Nominated	
2013	TVyNovelas Awards	Best Actor	David Zepeda	Won	
2013	TVyNovelas Awards	Best Antagonist Actress	Sabine Moussier	Nominated	
2013	TVyNovelas Awards	Best Antagonist Actor	Salvador Zerboni	Nominated	
2013	TVyNovelas Awards	Best Leadng Actress	Blanca Guerra	Won	
2013	TVyNovelas Awards	Best Leadng Actress	Raquel Olmedo	Nominated	
2013	TVyNovelas Awards	Best Leading Actor	Alejandro Camacho	Won	
2013	TVyNovelas Awards	Best Co-lead Actress	Eugenia Cauduro	Nominated	
2013	TVyNovelas Awards	Best Co-lead Actor	Francisco Gattorno	Nominated	
2013	TVyNovelas Awards	Best Supporting Actress	Raquel Olmedo	Won	
2013	TVyNovelas Awards	Best Supporting Actor	Eric del Castillo	Nominated	
2013	TVyNovelas Awards	Best Young Lead Actress	Livia Brito	Won	
2013	TVyNovelas Awards	Best Female Revelation	Esmeralda Pimentel	Nominated	
2013	TVyNovelas Awards	Best Male Revelation	Alberto Agnesi	Nominated	
2013	TVyNovelas Awards	Best Musical Theme	"Solo un suspiro" by Óscar Cruz and Alejandra Orozco	Won	
2013	TVyNovelas Awards	Best Original Story or Adaptation	Juan Carlos Alcalá; Rosa Salazar; Fermín Zúñiga	Nominated	
2013	TVyNovelas Awards	Best Direction	Claudio Reyes Rubio; Sergio Cataño	Nominated	
2013	Audience's Favorites (by TVyNovelas Awards)	Favorite Telenovela	Angelli Nesma Medina	Won	
2013	Audience's Favorites (by TVyNovelas Awards)	The Most Beautiful Woman	Livia Brito	Won	
2013	Audience's Favorites (by TVyNovelas Awards)	The Most Handsome Man	David Zepeda	Won	
2013	Audience's Favorites (by TVyNovelas Awards)	Favorite Villain	Sabine Moussier	Nominated	
2013	Audience's Favorites (by TVyNovelas Awards)	Favorite Finale	Angelli Nesma Medina	Nominated	
2013	Bravo Awards	Best Telenovela	Angelli Nesma Medina	Won	
2013	Bravo Awards	Best Actress	Angelique Boyer	Won	
2013	Bravo Awards	Best Actor	David Zepeda	Won	
2013	Bravo Awards	Best Antagonist Actress	Sabine Moussier	Won	
2013	Bravo Awards	Best Leading Actor	Alejandro Camacho	Won	
2013	Bravo Awards	Best Female Revelation	Esmeralda Pimentel	Won	
2013	Bravo Awards	Best Male Revelation	Alberto Agnesi	Won	
2013	Bravo Awards	Best Child Actress	Briggitte Bozzo	Won	
2013	Bravo Awards	Best Child Actor	Robin Vega	Won	
