= Amar sin límites =

Mexican telenovela

- René Strickler, Karyme Lozano, and Valentino Lanús in a promotional poster for Amar sin límites
- Genre: Telenovela; Romance; Drama
- Created by: Gustavo Belatti; Mario Segade
- Developed by: José Rendón; Ana Montes
- Written by: Ximena Suárez
- Directed by: José Rendón
- Starring: Karyme Lozano; Valentino Lanús; René Strickler; Mónika Sánchez; María Sorté; Otto Sirgo; José Carlos Ruiz; Alma Muriel
- Theme music composer: Alexis Aranda
- Opening theme: Dispárame, dispara, by Laura Pausini
- Ending theme: Dispárame, dispara, by Laura Pausini
- Country of origin: Mexico
- Original language: Spanish
- No. of episodes: 125

Production
- Executive producer: Angelli Nesma Medina
- Production locations: Filming; Televisa San Ángel; Mexico City, Mexico; Locations; Mexico City, Mexico
- Editors: Julio Abreu; Juan Franco; Luis Horacio Valdés
- Camera setup: Multi-camera
- Running time: 21-22 minutes (episodes 1-10); 41-44 minutes (episodes 11-135)
- Production company: Televisa

Original release
- Network: Canal de las Estrellas
- Release: October 16, 2006 – April 20, 2007

Related
- Resistiré (2003); Watch Over Me (2006)

Amar sin Límites (English: Limitless Love) is a Mexican telenovela produced by Angelli Nesma Medina for Televisa in 2006. This limited-run serial is a remake of the hit 2003 Argentine telenovela Resistiré; it is the first such remake, as a second adaptation, Watch Over Me, was created for MyNetworkTV in the United States and debuted in December 2006.

On Monday, October 16, 2006, Canal de las Estrellas started broadcasting Amar sin límites weekdays at 7:30pm, replacing Duelo de pasiones. The last episode was broadcast on Friday, April 20, 2007, with Muchachitas como tú replacing it the following Monday.

Karyme Lozano and Valentino Lanús starred as protagonists, and René Strickler, Sabine Moussier, Alma Muriel and Mónika Sánchez as antagonists.

== Cast ==
=== Main ===
- Karyme Lozano as Azul Toscano/Azucena
- Valentino Lanús as Diego Morán Huerta
- René Strickler as Mauricio Duarte
- Mónika Sánchez as Silvana Lombardo
- María Sorté as Clemencia Huerta de Morán
- Otto Sirgo as Alfredo Toscano
- José Carlos Ruiz as Don Aurelio Huerta
- Alma Muriel as Leonarda Galván
- Sabine Moussier as Eva Santoro

=== Supporting ===
- Isaura Espinoza as Isela
- Lourdes Munguía as Emilia
- Socorro Bonilla as Gloria Provenzano
- Luis Bayardo as Don Jesús "Chucho" Rivera
- Diana Golden as Inés Menzur
- Juan Carlos Serrán as Aníbal Menéndez
- Marco Muñoz as Manuel Morán
- Eduardo Liñán as Román Pérez Castelar
- Luis Xavier as Julio Corso
- Arsenio Campos as Leandro Burgay
- Jaime Lozano as Efraín García
- Alejandro Ruiz as Gustavo "Tavo" Lara
- Patsy as Liliana de Duarte
- Carmen Becerra as Lidia Morán Huerta
- Manuela Ímaz as Cecilia Galindo
- Jorge de Silva as Arnaldo Toscano
- Lisardo as Piero Escobar
- Estrella Lugo as Lucía
- Marcelo Córdoba as Andrés Galván
- Óscar Ferretti as Gaspar García
- Rafael del Villar as Iván
- Mariana Beyer as Caty Duarte
- Julio Camejo as Paco
- Agustín Arana as Luis Felipe Peña
- Alejandro Ávila as Mario López
- Myrrah Saavedra as Magda de Peña
- Lupita Lara as Madre María
- Alejandro Correa as Frijolito
- Ernesto Faxas as Flavio
- Adriano Zendejas as Dieguito Morán Toscano
- Ricardo Franco as Dr. Linares

== Awards ==
Year	Award	Category	Nominee	Result
2007	25th TVyNovelas Awards	Best Actress	Karyme Lozano	Nominated
2007	25th TVyNovelas Awards	Best Actor	Valentino Lanús	Nominated
2007	25th TVyNovelas Awards	Best Antagonist Actress	Sabine Moussier	Nominated
2007	25th TVyNovelas Awards	Best Antagonist Actor	René Strickler	Nominated
2007	25th TVyNovelas Awards	Best Leading Actress	María Sorté	Nominated
2007	25th TVyNovelas Awards	Best Leading Actor	José Carlos Ruiz	Nominated
2007	25th TVyNovelas Awards	Best Musical Theme	"Dispárame, dispara"	Nominated
