= Adriano Zendejas =

Mexican actor

- Born: March 19, 1998 (age 28); Mexico City, Mexico
- Occupations: Actor, streamer y tiktoker
- Years active: 2006-present
- Known for: Streamer
- Notable work: La rosa de Guadalupe

Adriano Zendejas (born March 19, 1998) is a Mexican television actor and streamer

== Biography ==
Zendejas was born on March 19, 1998, in Mexico City, Mexico, has two sisters Samadhi and Dassana Zendejas. He began doing commercial television since childhood. Zendejas studied acting at Televisa's Centro de Educación Artistica (CEA).

== Filmography ==
Film roles
Year	Title	Roles	Notes
2012	Hidden Moon	Tobías	

Television roles
Year	Title	Roles	Notes
2006	Marina	Child Chuy	
2006	Amar sin límites	Dieguito Morán Toscano	
2007	Muchachitas como tú	Patricio	
2008–2009	Juro que te amo	Daniel Madrigal	
2009–2013	La rosa de Guadalupe	Ángel Mario Fernando Ismael	Episode: "La asesina" Episode: "Una familia nueva" Episode: "Plan maestro para hijos en vacaciones" Episode: "También a los chavos"
2009	Mi pecado	Child Julián Huerta Aldama	6 episodes
2009	Corazón salvaje	Juan de Dios San Román Montes de Oca	4 episodes
2009	Hermanos y detectives	Unknown role	Episode: "Tiempos difíciles"
2010	Niña de mi corazón	Damián Paz	
2011–2013	Como dice el dicho	Young Mauro Unknown role Mauro Felipe	Episode: "Vale más ladrón arrepentido" Episode: "Hijo eres, padre serás" Episode: "El miedo es natural" Episode: "Como te ves, me ví"
2011	La fuerza del destino	Child Iván	3 episodes
2012	Abismo de pasión	Vicente	
2013	Nueva vida	Unknown role	Episode: "Señora mamá"
2014	Quiero amarte	José	
2015	Que te perdone Dios	Toño	
2015–2016	A que no me dejas	Tobías	
2017	Mariposa de Barrio	Gustavo Rivera (age 17–28)	24 episodes
2019	Decisiones: Unos ganan, otros pierden	Emilio	Episode: "El baúl"
2019	Club 57 (TV series)	Victor	
