= Angelli Nesma Medina =

Mexican producer

- Born: Angelli Nesma Medina; Mexico
- Occupation: Producer
- Years active: 1978–present

Angelli Nesma Medina (born in Mexico) is a Mexican producer.

== Filmography ==
Executive Producer, Associate Producer, Production Assistant, Production Manager
Year	Title	Notes
1978–79	Viviana	Production Assistant
1979–80	Los ricos también lloran	Production Assistant
1979–80	Los ricos también lloran	Production Manager
1980–81	Colorina	Production Manager
1981	El hogar que yo robé	Production Manager
1982–83	Chispita	Production Manager
1983	Amalia Batista	Production Manager
1984–85	Los años felices	Production Manager
1985	Los años pasan	Production Manager
1986	Monte Calvario	Production Manager
1987–1988	Rosa salvaje	Production Manager
1989–1990	Carrusel	Associate Producer
1990	Mi pequeña Soledad	Associate Producer
1993	Entre la vida y la muerte	Executive Producer
1995–96	María la del Barrio	Executive Producer
1996–1997	Mi querida Isabel	Executive Producer
1997–1998	Sin ti	Executive Producer
1998–1999	Camila	Executive Producer
1999	Por tu amor	Executive Producer
2000–2001	Por un beso	Executive Producer
2003	Niña Amada Mía	Executive Producer
2004–2005	Apuesta por un amor	Executive Producer
2006–2007	Amar sin límites	Executive Producer
2007–2008	Al diablo con los guapos	Executive Producer
2008–2009	Un gancho al corazón	Executive Producer
2010–2011	Llena de amor	Executive Producer
2012	Abismo de pasión	Executive Producer
2013–2014	Lo que la vida me robó	Executive Producer
2015	Que te perdone Dios	Executive Producer
2016	Tres veces Ana	Executive Producer
2017–2018	Me declaro culpable	Executive Producer
2022	Amor dividido	Executive Producer
2024	Tu vida es mi vida	Executive Producer

== Awards and nominations ==
Year	Award	Category	Telenovela	Result
1996	Premios TVyNovelas	Special Award for the highest rated by telenovela	María la del Barrio	Won
2003	Premios TVyNovelas	Best Telenovela of the Year	Niña Amada Mía	Nominated
2005	Premios TVyNovelas	Best Telenovela of the Year	Apuesta por un amor	Nominated
2009	Premios TVyNovelas	Best Telenovela of the Year	Al diablo con los guapos	Nominated
2011	Premios TVyNovelas	Best Telenovela of the Year	Llena de amor	Nominated
2013	Premios TVyNovelas	Best Telenovela of the Year	Abismo de pasión	Nominated
2013	Premios TVyNovelas	Novela Favorita	Abismo de pasión	Won
