= Eugenio Siller =

Mexican actor, singer, and model (born 1981)

- Born: Eugenio Siller Margain; 5 April 1981 (age 45); Tampico, Tamaulipas, Mexico
- Occupations: Actor; Singer
- Years active: 1998–present
- Musical career
- Genres: Pop
- Instrument: Vocals

Eugenio Siller Margain (born April 5, 1981) is a Mexican actor, singer, and model who is best known for starring in popular novelas Rebelde, Código Postal, Al Diablo con los Guapos, Mi pecado, Aurora, Una Maid en Manhattan, ¿Quién es quién? and Reina de Corazones.

Eugenio Siller began his career as an actor in multiple commercials, as well as a player in musical comedies and theatrical productions.

In 1998, Eugenio became part of a singing group called Klishé, along with his older brother, Mundo, and two friends. They later formed an eponymous duo named Canela, later had a modelling career in Italy. He became interested in acting in 2005. He graduated from CEA, an acting school in Mexico.

In 2006, he had a breakthrough role in Rebelde, a Mexican telenovela, playing the part of Luciano. He then was cast in the hit teen series, Código Postal, playing the role of a blind man named Rafael Rojas Alonso. His first leading role came in 2007, in the hit telenovela Al Diablo con los Guapos, in which he played Alejandro Belmonte, a rebellious rich-boy who falls in love with Allisson Lozz's character Milagros. In 2009, Siller starred in the telenovela Mi Pecado in the main role of Julian Huerta Almada, the love interest of Lucrecia Córdoba, played by his former CEA classmate and friend, Maite Perroni. From November 2010 to May 2011, he played the lead role of Martín Lobos on Telemundo-produced telenovela, Aurora. He starred in Telemundo's telenovela Una Maid en Manhattan as Cristóbal Parker Salas (Main Hero) along with Litzy and the telenovela aired between 2011-2012. He stars in Netflix's Who Killed Sara? as Chema Lazcano (2021 - ).

== Filmography ==
Film roles
Year	Title	Roles	Notes
2017	Blind Trust	John O'Donnell	The Georgia Latino Film Festival for Best Actor
2019	Tod@s caen	Esteban	
2019	Super Bomberos	Mecha	
2019	Jesús de Nazaret	Juan	

Television roles
Year	Title	Roles	Notes
2006	Rebelde	Luciano	Recurring role
2006–2007	Código postal	Rafael Rojas Alonso	Recurring role; 200 episodes
2007–2008	Al diablo con los guapos	Alejandro Belmonte Arango	Main role; 175 episodes
2009	Mi pecado	Julián Huerta Aldama	Main role; 106 episodes
2010	Aurora	Martín Lobos	Main role; 135 episodes
2011–2012	Una Maid en Manhattan	Cristóbal Parker	Main role; 168 episodes
2014	Reina de corazones	Nicolás Núñez / Javier Bolivar	Main role; 140 episodes
2015–2016	¿Quién es quién?	Leonardo Fuentemayor / Pedro Pérez González "Perico"	Main role; 120 episodes
2016	Noches con Platanito	Himself	Episode: "Eugenio Siller/Lisset/Adam Aadlerks/Araceli Adame/Alfredo Olivas"
2021–2022	¿Quién mató a Sara?	José Maria Lazcano	Main Role
2025	Pecados inconfesables	Pablo Morales	
2027	Todavía te amo	Raúl Bracamontes	

== Discography ==
1. Con Devocion – The band Siller participated in the OTI Festival with this album. The Heraldo de Mexico recognized them as "Youth Group of the Year". Two singles were released on Mexican radio:
  1. Dame de Ti
  2. Devocion
2. Amor Violento – This was Siller's second album, released in February 2000. It consisted of 14 songs written and produced by Marco Flores.
3. Eugenio Siller - Singles – This release consisted of 3 singles Triste Adios, Esperame y Sin Mirar, released throughout 2007 and 2009 while his soap operas were on air.
4. Eugenio Siller - Aurora Hits – This release consists of songs from the Telemundo telenovela Aurora sung and composed by Eugenio and produced by Marco Flores.
