= Sergio Goyri =

Mexican actor (born 1958)

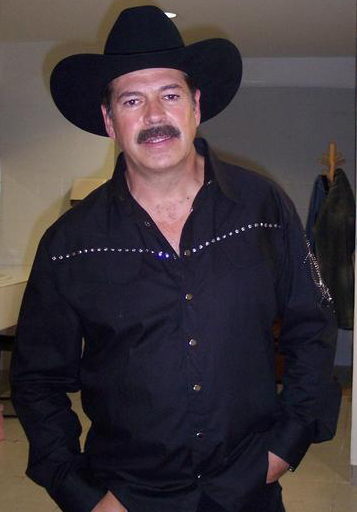
- Born: Sergio Goyri Pérez; 14 November 1958 (age 67); Acopinalco del Peñón Tlaxco Tlaxcala, Mexico
- Occupation: Actor
- Years active: 1976–present
- Spouse: Telly Filippini
- Children: 5

Sergio Goyri Pérez (born 14 November 1958) is a Mexican actor known for his performances in soap operas.

== Filmography ==
Television roles
Year	Title	Roles	Notes
1976	Mundos opuestos	Joaquín	Recurring role
1981	Extraños caminos del amor	Álvaro	Recurring role
1983–1984	El maleficio	César	Main cast
1985	Angélica	Humberto	Lead role
1987	El precio de la fama	Jaime Garay	Lead role
1990	Días sin luna	Andrés	Lead role
1991-1992	Vida robada	Carlos	Main cast
1995-1996	El premio mayor	Jorge	Main cast
1996-1997	Te sigo amando	Ignacio Aguirre	Main cast
2000	La casa en la playa	Juan Carlos Cabrera	Lead role
2001	Sin pecado concebido	Emiliano Martorel Ochoa	Main cast
2003	Niña amada mía	Víctor Izaguirre	Lead role
2004	Rubí	Yago Píetrasanta	Recurring role
2005	piel de otoño	Ramon mendoza	Main cast
2006	Duelo de pasiones	Álvaro Montellano	Main cast
2007	Amor sin maquillaje	Héctor Ibarra	Main cast
2009	Mi pecado	Gabino Roura Beltrán	Main cast
2010	Soy tu dueña	Rosendo Gavilán	Main cast; 125 episodes
2011-2012	Dos hogares	Ricardo Valtierra	Main role; 151 episodes
2013	Corazón indomable	Álvaro Cifuentes	Recurring role; 31 episodes
2015	Que te perdone Dios	Fausto López Guerra	Main cast; 122 episodes
2016	Señora Acero: La Coyote	Jesús "Chucho" Casáres	Main cast (season 3); 91 episodes
2018-2019	Falsa Identidad	Gavino Gaona	Main cast (season 1); 79 Episodes
2021	Diseñando tu amor	Guillermo Vargas Mota	Main cast; 120 episodes
2022	Pasión de gavilanes	Samuel Caballero	Guest star (season 2); 71 episodes
2023	Tierra de esperanza	Rutilio Ferrer	Main cast
2025	Los hilos del pasado	Ramiro	Main cast
2026	Tierra de amor y coraje	Rogelio Barrios	Main cast

== Awards and nominations ==
=== TVyNovelas Awards ===
Year	Category	Soap opera	Results
2012	Best Lead Actor	Dos hogares	Nominated
2011	Best Male Antagonist	Soy tu dueña	Nominated
2010	Best First Actor	Mi pecado	Nominated
2006	Best Male Antagonist	Piel de otoño	Won
2003	Best Lead Actor	Niña amada mia	Nominated
2002	Best Male Antagonist	Sin pecado concebido	Nominated
1998	Best Lead Actor	Te sigo amando	Won
1991	Best Lead Actor	Días sin luna	Nominated
1984	Best Male Revelation	El maleficio	Won

== Controversy ==
In 2019, Goyri received significant negative coverage after complaining about the film community nominating Yalitza Aparicio for an Oscar, stating it was unthinkable that a "damn Indian woman" who only says "yes ma’am, no ma’am" could receive the award.
