= César Évora =

Cuban (born 1959)

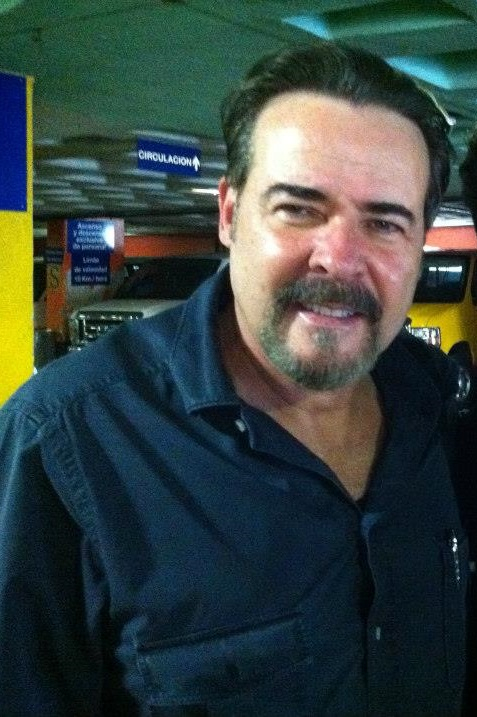
- Born: César Évora Díaz; November 4, 1959 (age 67); Havana, Cuba
- Citizenship: Cuban, Mexican
- Occupation: Actor,
- Years active: 1982-present
- Spouse: Vivian Domínguez (m. 1992)
- Children: Rafael, Carla and Mariana

César Évora Díaz (Spanish pronunciation: [ˈsesaɾ ˈeβoɾa]; born November 4, 1959) is a Cuban actor.

== Biography ==
Évora began his career in Cuba, appearing in more than ten films before moving to Mexico in the early 1990s. He became known for playing minor roles in the seminal telenovelas Corazón salvaje (1993) and the long-running Agujetas de color de rosa (1994). In 1995, Évora had his first leading role, starring opposite Daniela Romo in Si Dios Me Quita La Vida.

Leading roles in Luz Clarita, Gente bien and especially El Privilegio de Amar soon established Évora as one of the most popular leading men in the industry. He has maintained a high profile after performances in successful productions such as La Madrastra, La esposa virgen, and Mundo de Fieras. He recently acted in telenovelas Al diablo con los guapos, En nombre del amor, Triunfo del Amor, Abismo de pasión and Amor Bravío. He will star as the villain in Salvador Mejía's new telenovela: La tempestad. In addition, he will have a special participation in Nathalie Lartilleux's telenovela: Corazón indomable.

Évora acquired Mexican citizenship in 1999.

== Personal life ==
Évora is divorced from his first wife. He is currently married to Vivian Domínguez and has three children.

== Films ==
Évora appeared in several Cuban films before migrating to México.

Year	Title
1982	Cecilia
1983	Amada
1984	Habanera
1985	Una Novia Para David
1986	Un Hombre de Éxito
1986	Capablanca
1989	Barrio Negro
1989	La Bella de Alhambra
1991	Gertrudis
2010	Trópico de Sangre

== Telenovelas ==
Year	Title	Role	Notes
1993-94	Corazón salvaje	Marcelo Romero Vargas	Recurring role
1994-95	Agujetas de color de rosa	Esteban Armendares	Recurring role
1995	Si Dios me quita la vida	Antonio Foscari	Main role
1996	Cañaveral de Pasiones	Amador Montero	Guest star
1996-1997	Luz Clarita	Mariano De La Fuente	Main role
1997	Gente bien	Jaime Dumas	Main cast
1998-1999	El Privilegio de Amar	Padre Juan de la Cruz Velarde	Main cast
1999-2000	Laberintos de pasión	Gabriel Almada	Main role
2000-2001	Abrázame muy fuerte	Federico "Fede" Rivero	Main cast
2001-2002	El Manantial	Rigoberto Valdés	Guest star
2002	Entre el amor y el odio	Octavio Villarreal	Main role
2002-2003	Así son ellas	Luis Ávila	Guest star
2003-2004	Mariana de la Noche	Atilio Montenegro	Main cast
2005	La Madrastra	Esteban San Román	Main role
2005	La esposa virgen	Edmundo Rivadeneyra "El Loco Serenata"	Recurring role
2006-2007	Mundo de fieras	Gabriel Cervantes-Bravo; Demián Martinez Guerra	Main role
2007	Amor sin maquillaje	Pedro Ríos	Recurring role
2007-2008	Yo amo a Juan Querendón	Samuel Cachón	Guest star
2007-2008	Al diablo con los guapos	Constancio Belmonte Lascuraín	Main cast
2008-2009	En nombre del amor	Eugenio Lizardi	Recurring role
2010-2011	Llena de amor	Emiliano Ruiz y de Teresa	Main cast
2010-2011	Triunfo del amor	Dr. Heriberto Rios Bernal	Main cast
2012	Abismo de pasión	Rosendo Arango	Guest star
2012	Amor Bravío	Dionisio Ferrer/Héctor Gutiérrez	Main cast
2013	Corazón indomable	Alejandro Mendoza	Recurring role
2013	La Tempestad	Fulgencio Salazar	Main cast
2014-2015	Hasta el fin del mundo	Francisco "Paco" Fernández	Recurring role
2015-2016	A que no me dejas	Osvaldo Terán	Recurring role
2016	Las amazonas	Victoriano Santos	Main cast
2017	La doble vida de Estela Carrillo	Walter Cabrera	Guest star
2017	En tierras salvajes	Arturo Otero	Main cast
2019	Ringo	Óscar "Oso" Villar	Main cast
2020	Vencer el miedo	Horacio Cienfuentes	Recurring role
2020	Te doy la vida	Nelson Lopez	Main cast
2021	¿Qué le pasa a mi familia?	Jesús Rojas Bañuelos	Main cast
2021-2022	SOS me estoy enamorando	Leopoldo Fernandez	Main cast
2022	El último rey	Francisco Manjarrez	Recurring role
2023	Perdona nuestros pecados	Héctor Morales	Main cast
2023	Minas de pasión	Ignacio Villamizar	Guest star
2024	Fugitivas, en busca de la libertad	Patricio Rojas "El Policia"	
2025	Me atrevo a amarte	Valente Pérez-Soler	
2026	Sabor a ti	Vicente Sarmiento	

== Series and theater ==
Year	Title
1993	Día y Noche
1998-99	Tú mientes, yo miento, todos mentimos
2004	Trampa de Muerte
2006-07	Cartas de Amor

== Awards and nominations ==
=== Premios INTE ===
Year	Category	Telenovela	Result
2003	Best Actor	Entre el amor y el odio	Nominated

=== People en Español ===
Year	Category	Telenovela	Result
2012	Best Male Villain	Amor Bravío	Won
2013	Best Male Villain	La tempestad	Won

== See also ==
- List of Cubans
- List of Mexicans
