= Tara Parra =

Cuban-Mexican actress (1932–2025)

- Born: 23 August 1932; Havana, Cuba
- Died: 12 September 2025 (aged 93); Mexico City, Mexico
- Occupation: Actress

Tara Parra (23 August 1932 – 12 September 2025) was a Cuban-Mexican actress. She played in numerous theatre plays and telenovelas, including Daniela, El extraño retorno de Diana Salazar and Destino.

== Life and career ==
Parra started her career as a 14-year-old in 1946 in the play based on the novel Rosalba y los llaveros y otras obras de teatro, directed by Salvador Novo, with Ignacio López Tarso, who played her father.

She began her film career in 1981 with the movie Carta a un niño. In television, her first credit was in 1986 with the telenovela Cuna de lobos. Her major roles were in plays, while her roles in cinema and television were more minor. Her major roles in telenovelas included El extraño retorno de Diana Salazar (1988), in which she played Constanza de Santiago and Daniela (2002) as Consuelo Gamboa.

Parra was married to writer Argelio Gasca (born 1939), with two sons, and also actress Kenia Gascón and the compositor David Gasca. Tara Parra died on 12 September 2025, at the age of 93.

== Filmography ==
- La casa de las flores (2020) as Yolanda Lascuráin
- Desenfrenadas (2020) as Teté
- Una familia con Madre (2019)
- Más sabe el diablo por viejo (2018) como Victoria Placeres
- La delgada línea amarilla (2015) as Doña Carmen
- Destino (2013) as Nana Sofía
- Hidden Moon (2012) as mujer sabia
- Mi universo en minúsculas (2011) as Elba
- Soy tu fan (2010) as Genoveva "Beba"
- Más allá de la luz (2010)
- Los Minondo (2010) as Isabel San Juan
- A cada quien su santo (2009) as Isaura
- Amor letra por letra (2008) as Refugio "Abue Cuca"
- El milagrito de San Jacinto (2007)
- Lo que callamos las mujeres (2007) as Nadia
- La sangre iluminada (2007)
- Sexo, amor y otras perversiones (2006) as Madre
- Ni una vez más (2006) as Lourdes "Mamá Lulú"
- La leche y el agua (2006) as La Mujer
- Línea nocturna (2006) as Bromelia
- Sin ton ni Sonia (2003) as Rosa
- Una de dos (2002) as Ofelia
- Daniela (2002) as Consuelo Gamboa "Chelito"
- La culpa (1996) as la presidenta de las Damas
- María la del barrio (1995) as la madre superiora Matilde
- Prisionera de amor (1994) as Miriam
- Tiempo cautivo (1994) as Lula
- Madres egoístas (1991–1993) as Doña Soledad "Sol" Deschamps
- Destino (1989) as Beatriz
- Ángeles blancos (1989) as Remedios
- El extraño retorno de Diana Salazar (1988) as Doña Constanza de Santiago
- Cuna de lobos (1986) as Madame Tara
- Carta a un niño (1981) as Sara
- El diario de una señorita decente (1969) as Carla
