= La fuerza del amor =

Mexican telenovela

- Genre: Telenovela
- Written by: Rafael Olivera
- Directed by: José Acosta Nava
- Starring: Alfredo Adame; Gabriela Hassel; Ernesto Gómez Cruz; Eduardo Palomo; Karen Sentíes; Claudia Ortega; Ari Telch
- Opening theme: Instrumental
- Country of origin: Mexico
- Original language: Spanish
- No. of episodes: 155

Production
- Executive producer: Gonzalo Martínez Ortega
- Production locations: Pachuca, Mexico; Real del Monte, Mexico
- Camera setup: Multi-camera
- Production company: Televisa

Original release
- Network: Canal de las Estrellas
- Release: June 4, 1990 – January 4, 1991

Related
- Un rostro en mi pasado; Cenizas y diamantes

La fuerza del amor (English title: The power of love) is a Mexican telenovela produced by Gonzalo Martínez Ortega for Televisa in 1990.

Alfredo Adame and Gabriela Hassel starred as the protagonists, while Ernesto Gómez Cruz starred as the main antagonist.

== Plot ==
Felipe, Marcos and Carlos are three young and enthusiastic medical students, arriving in a village lost in Pachuca with intentions to practice there. But upon arrival, they find an emphatic rejection by the people, since everyone blindly relies on Don Torino, the healer of the place, who in reality has taken advantage of the trust of the people to manipulate them at will.

== Cast ==
- Alfredo Adame as Felipe
- Gabriela Hassel as Fabiola
- Ernesto Gómez Cruz as Don Torino
- Eduardo Palomo as Gilberto
- Karen Sentíes as María Inés
- Ari Telch as Marcos
- Odiseo Bichir as Carlos
- Juan Ignacio Aranda as Rodolfo
- Dolores Beristáin as Evelyn
- Óscar Bonfiglio as Héctor
- Josefina Echánove as Ana Bertha
- Katia del Río as Sheila
- Rocío Sobrado as Luz María
- Cecilia Tijerina as Haydeé
- Arturo García Tenorio as Ramón
- Maripaz García as Maritza
- Guillermo Gil as Don Gregorio
- Miguel Gómez Checa as Vicente
- Aarón Hernán as Rómulo
- Jaime Lozano as Dionisio
- Jorge Russek as Gustavo
- Luisa Huertas as Mercedes
- Edith Kleiman as Delfina
- Salvador Sánchez as Father Victoria
- Rafael Montalvo as Tomás
- Oscar Morelli as Damián
- Martha Navarro as Gertrudis
- Evangelina Martínez as Juana
- Mercedes Pascual as Dolores
- Rodrigo Puebla as Tacho
- Bruno Rey as Sabas
- Rubén Rojo as Mark
- Lizzeta Romo as Ángela
- Teresa Rábago as Josefina
- Alfredo Sevilla as Don Heliodoro
- Lilia Sixtos as Rosa
- Silvia Suárez as Luisa
- Evangelina Sosa as Chencha
- Blanca Sánchez as Irene

== Awards ==
Year	Award	Category	Nominee	Result
1991	9th TVyNovelas Awards	Best Actor	Alfredo Adame	Nominated
1991	9th TVyNovelas Awards	Best Antagonist Actor	Ernesto Gómez Cruz	Nominated
1991	9th TVyNovelas Awards	Best Young Lead Actor	Ari Telch	Nominated
1991	9th TVyNovelas Awards	Best Female Revelation	Gabriela Hassel	Nominated
