= 9th TVyNovelas Awards =

1991 Mexican TV awards

- Date: April 8, 1991
- Location: Centro de Espectáculos “Premier“, México D.F.
- Hosted by: Juan Calderón, Gloria Calzada, Rebecca de Alba, Gabriela Goldsmith & Lucero

Highlights
- Most awards: Yo compro esa mujer (5)
- Most nominations: Alcanzar una estrella (11); Cuando llega el amor (11); Yo compro esa mujer (11)

Television/radio coverage
- Network: Canal de las Estrellas

The 9th TVyNovelas Awards were an academy of special awards to the best soap operas and TV shows. The awards ceremony took place on April 8, 1991 in Centro de Espectáculos “Premier“, México D.F. The ceremony was televised in Mexico by Canal de las Estrellas.

Juan Calderón, Gloria Calzada, Rebecca de Alba, Gabriela Goldsmith and Lucero hosted the show. Yo compro esa mujer won 5 awards, the most for the evening. Other winners Alcanzar una estrella won 3 awards, including Best Telenovela; Cuando llega el amor, Días sin luna and Mi pequeña Soledad also won 3 awards and Destino won 1 award.

== Summary of awards and nominations ==
Telenovela	Nominations	Awards
Yo compro esa mujer	11	5
Alcanzar una estrella	11	3
Cuando llega el amor	11	3
Mi pequeña Soledad	9	3
Destino	9	1
Días sin luna	8	3
Cenizas y diamantes	5	0
La fuerza del amor	4	0
Ángeles blancos	3	0
Balada por un amor	1	0
Un rostro en mi pasado	1	0

== Winners and nominees ==
=== Telenovelas ===
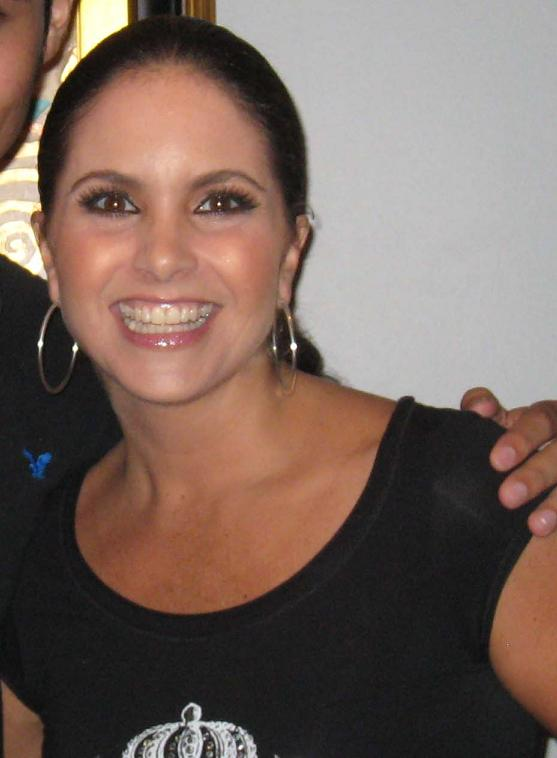
Lucero (in 2007), winner for Best Young Lead Actress.

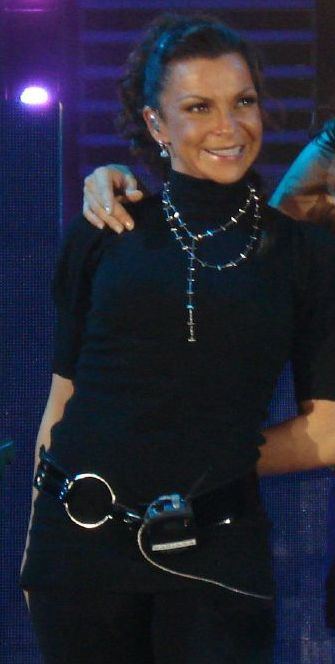
Mariana Garza (in 2007), winner for Best Female Revelation.

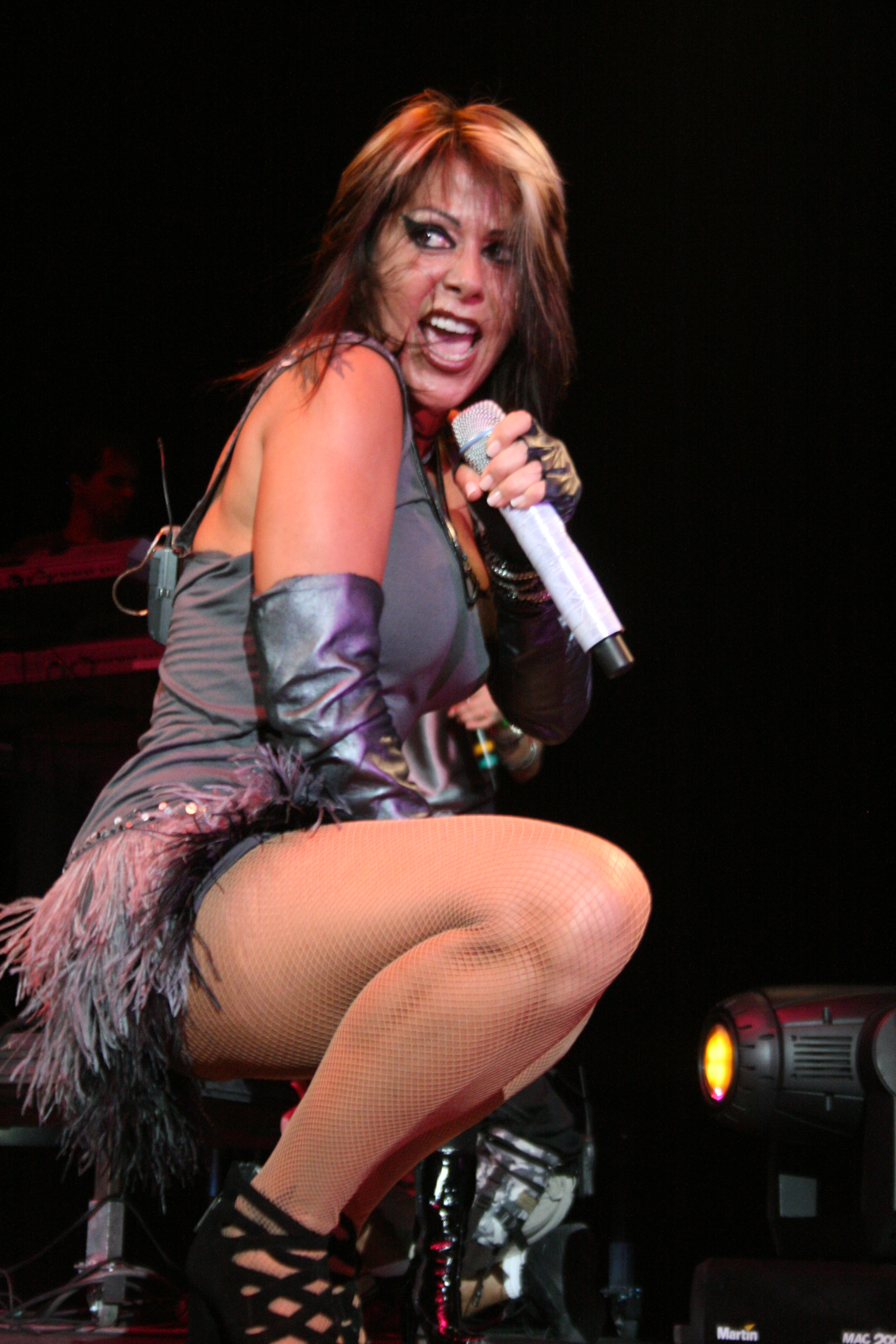
Alejandra Guzmán (in 2009), winner for Most Outstanding Female Singer.

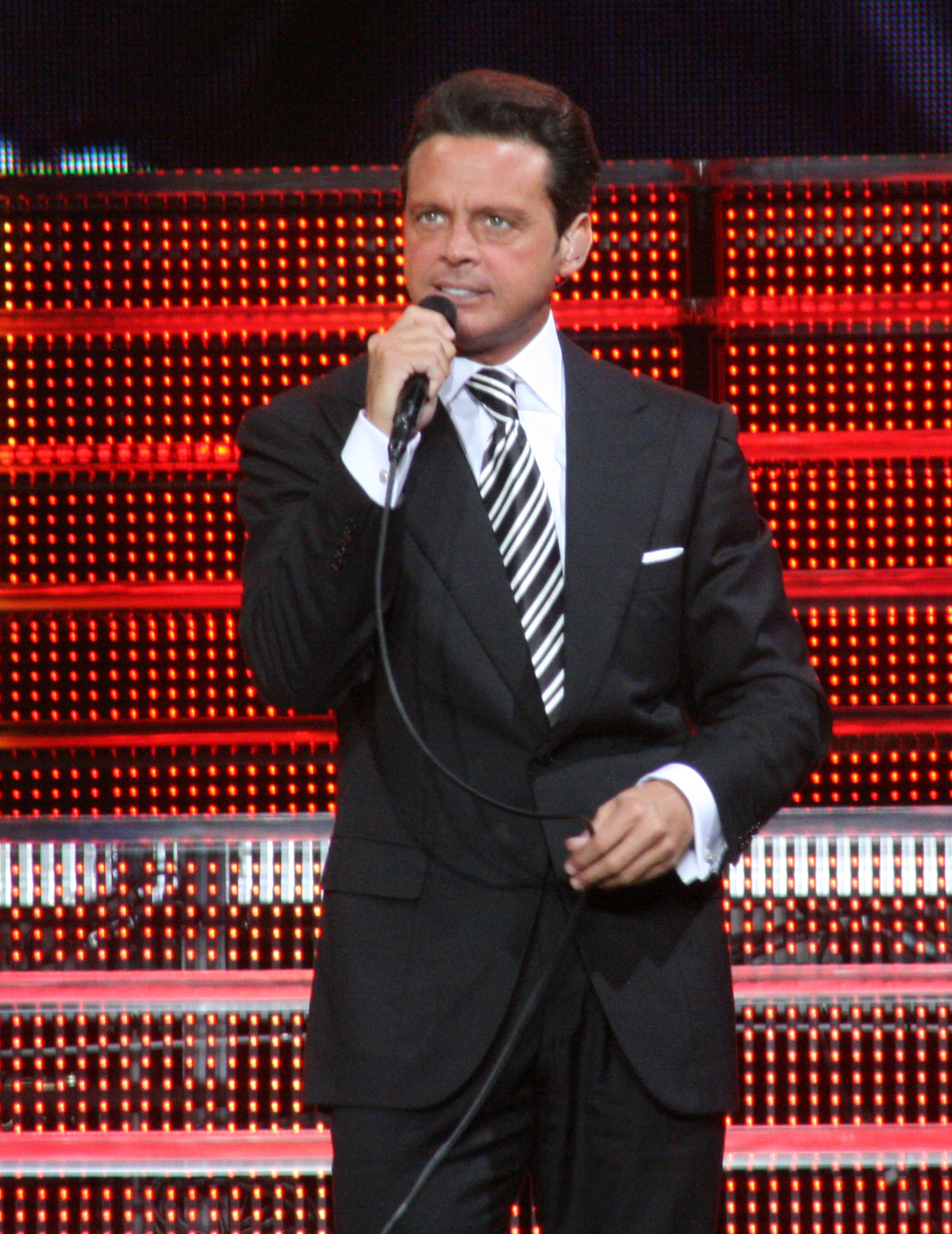
Luis Miguel (in 2008), winner for Most Outstanding Male Singer.

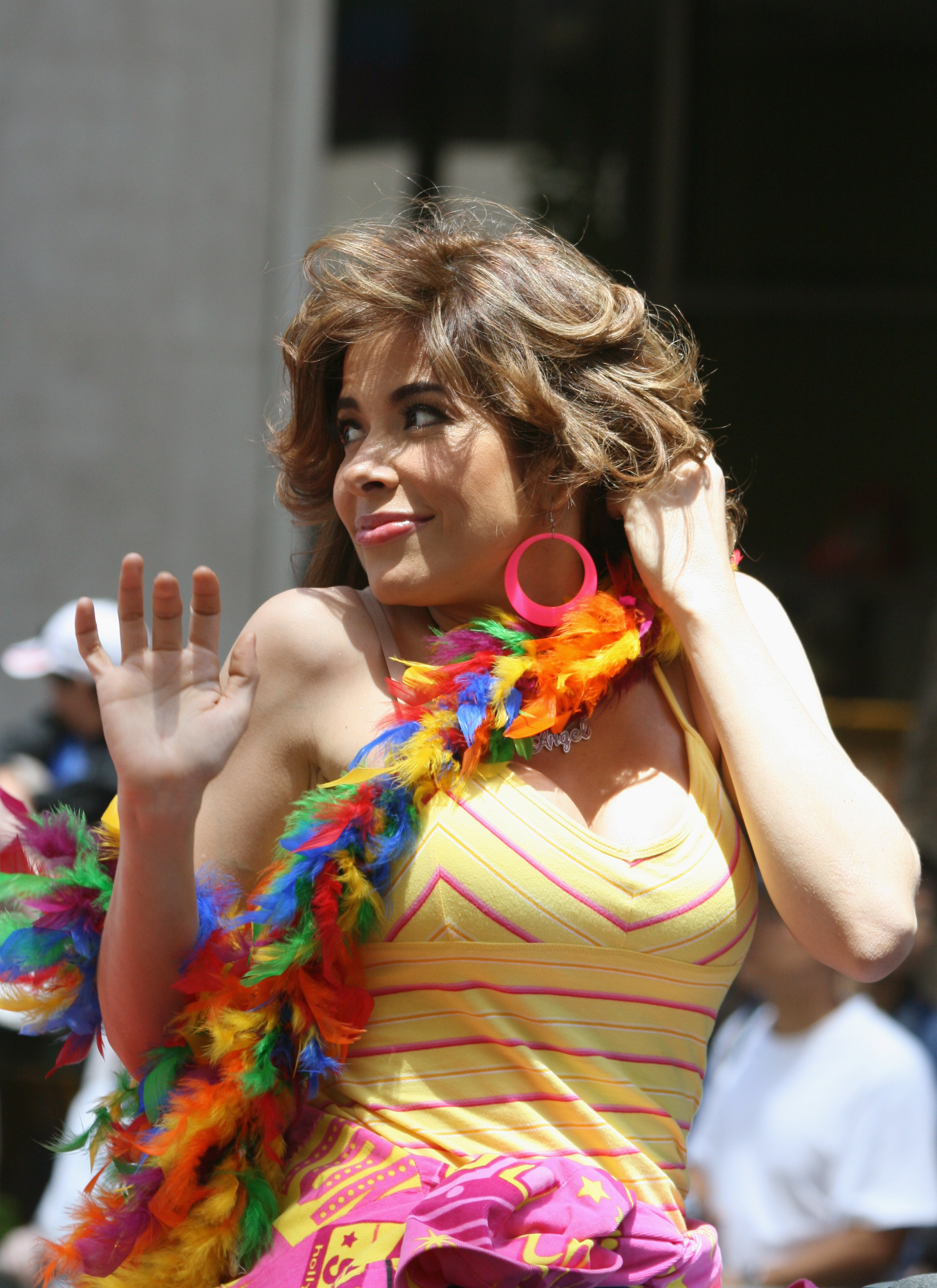
Gloria Trevi (in 2007), winner for Musical Revelation of the Year.

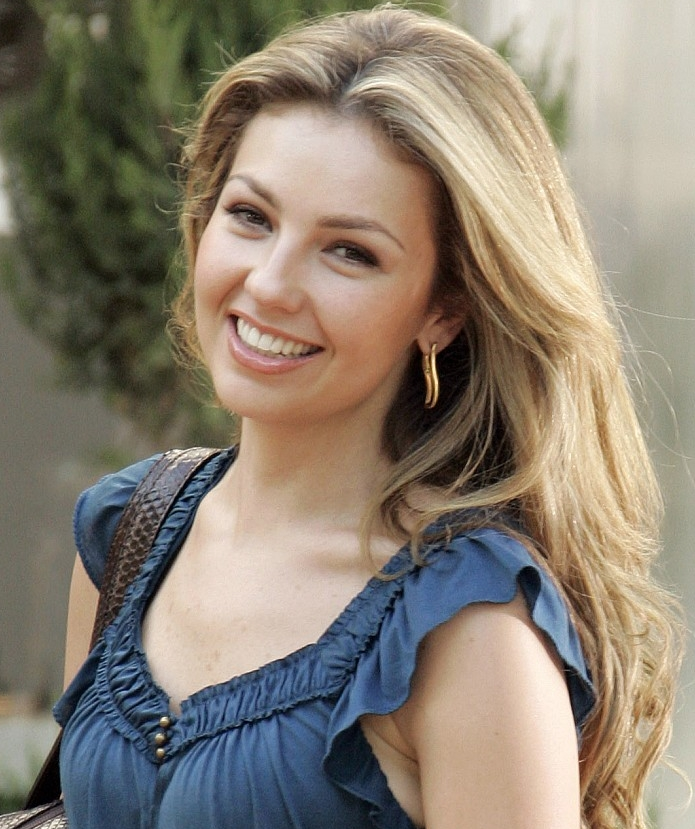
Thalía (in 2006), winner for Musical Debut of the Year.

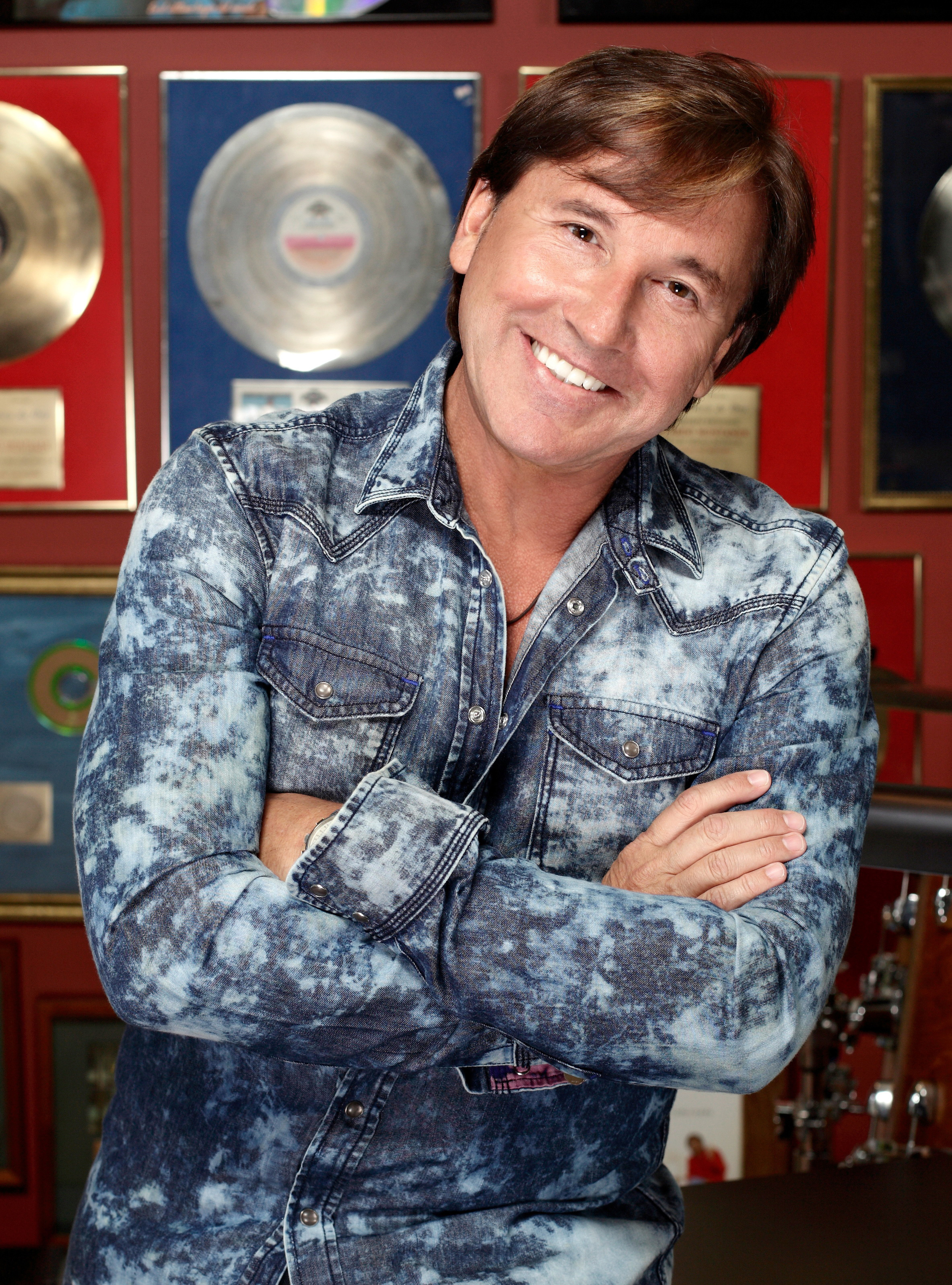
Ricardo Montaner (in 2010), awarded with a Special Award for Most Outstanding Foreign Singer.

Best Telenovela	Best Production
Alcanzar una estrella; Cuando llega el amor; Días sin luna; Mi pequeña Soledad; Yo compro esa mujer	Ernesto Alonso – Yo compro esa mujer
Best Actress	Best Actor
Verónica Castro – Mi pequeña Soledad; Angélica Aragón – Días sin luna; Daniela Romo – Balada por un amor; Jacqueline Andere – Ángeles blancos; Leticia Calderón – Yo compro esa mujer	Eduardo Yáñez – Yo compro esa mujer; Alfredo Adame – La fuerza del amor; Juan Ferrara – Destino; Rogelio Guerra – Ángeles blancos; Sergio Goyri – Días sin luna
Best Antagonist Actress	Best Antagonist Actor
July Furlong – Mi pequeña Soledad; Alma Muriel – Yo compro esa mujer; Mariagna Prats – Destino; Nailea Norvind – Cuando llega el amor; Rosa María Bianchi – Mi pequeña Soledad	Enrique Rocha – Yo compro esa mujer; Ernesto Gómez Cruz – La fuerza del amor; Fernando Balzaretti – Destino; Juan Carlos Casasola – Cuando llega el amor; Sergio Bustamante – Cenizas y diamantes
Best Leading Actress	Best Leading Actor
Ofelia Guilmáin – Días sin luna; Irán Eory – Cuando llega el amor; Isabela Corona – Yo compro esa mujer; Rita Macedo – Alcanzar una estrella; Susana Alexander – Cuando llega el amor	Jorge Russek – Días sin luna; Enrique Lizalde – Alcanzar una estrella; Eric del Castillo – Cuando llega el amor; Ignacio López Tarso – Ángeles blancos; Miguel Manzano – Yo compro esa mujer
Best Co-lead Actress	Best Co-lead Actor
Mariana Levy – Yo compro esa mujer; Ana Silvia Garza – Alcanzar una estrella; Marcela Páez – Alcanzar una estrella; María Rojo – Cuando llega el amor	Salvador Pineda – Mi pequeña Soledad; Héctor Suárez Gomis – Alcanzar una estrella; Luis Xavier – Yo compro esa mujer; Marco Muñoz – Destino; Marcos Valdés – Alcanzar una estrella
Best Young Lead Actress	Best Young Lead Actor
Lucero – Cuando llega el amor; Ana Colchero – Destino; Angélica Rivera – Mi pequeña Soledad; Daniela Castro – Días sin luna; Lola Merino – Cenizas y diamantes	Omar Fierro – Cuando llega el amor; Ari Telch – La fuerza del amor; Armando Araiza – Un rostro en mi pasado; Ernesto Laguardia – Cenizas y diamantes; Rafael Rojas – Mi pequeña Soledad
Best Female Revelation	Best Male Revelation
Mariana Garza – Alcanzar una estrella; Alejandra Procuna – Cenizas y diamantes; Angélica Ruvalcaba – Alcanzar una estrella; Gabriela Hassel – La fuerza del amor; Paola Ochoa – Mi pequeña Soledad	Eduardo Capetillo – Alcanzar una estrella; Alejandro Ibarra – Alcanzar una estrella; Orlando Carrió – Mi pequeña Soledad; Rodrigo Vidal – Cuando llega el amor; Tomás Goros – Destino
Best Child Performance	Best Original Story or Adaptation
Jair de Rubín – Días sin luna; Alejandro Gaytán – Días sin luna; Erick Sánchez – Destino; Karen Beatriz – Destino; Ricardo de Pascual Jr. – Cenizas y diamantes	María Zarattini – Destino
Best Direction	Best Direction of the Camaras
Miguel Córcega – Cuando llega el amor	Jesús Acuña Lee – Yo compro esa mujer

=== Others ===
Best Comedy Program	Best Entertainment Program
¡Anabel!; Chespirito; Dr. Cándido Pérez; Los comediantes; Papá soltero	Siempre en Domingo; Estrellas de los 90; Galardón a los grandes; Noche de valores; Los super especiales
Best Comedy Actress	Best Comedy Actor
Anabel Ferreira – ¡Anabel!; Alejandra Meyer – Dr. Cándido Pérez; Florinda Meza – Chespirito; María Alicia Delgado – ¡Anabel!; María Elena Saldaña – ¡Ándale!	Roberto Gómez Bolaños – Chespirito; Carlos Ignacio – ¡Anabel!; Édgar Vivar – Chespirito; Eugenio Derbez – ¡Anabel!; Jorge Ortiz de Pinedo – Dr. Cándido Pérez
Best Hostess	Best Host
Gloria Calzada – Noche de valores; Ilse – Galardón a los grandes; Ivonne e Ivette – Estrellas de los 90; Pati Chapoy – El mundo del espectáculo	Juan Calderón – ECO; Coco Levy – Rockotorreo; Paco Stanley – ECO; Víctor Godea – ECO
Most Outstanding Female Singer	Most Outstanding Male Singer
Alejandra Guzmán; Ana Gabriel; Daniela Romo; Lucero; Yuri	Luis Miguel; Chayanne; Emmanuel; José José; Manuel Mijares
Musical Revelation of the Year	Musical Debut of the Year
Gloria Trevi; Carlos Cuevas; Fernanda; Héctor Yaber	Thalía; Chantal Andere; Eduardo Capetillo; Mariana Garza; Sergio Dalma

=== Special awards ===
- Most Outstanding Foreign Singer: Ricardo Montaner
- Female Musical Career: Rocío Dúrcal
- Male Musical Career: José Luis Rodríguez "El Puma"
- Artistic Lifetime Achievement Award: Evita Muñoz "Chachita"
- Best Series Airing for 5 Consecutive Years in Mexico: Mujer, casos de la vida real by Silvia Pinal
- Recognition for Diffusion of Mexican Music Abroad: Mora Arriaga Family
- Most Beautiful Hair in Telenovelas: Daniela Castro and Raúl Araiza

=== Absent ===
Winners who were not present to receive their award:

- Veronica Castro - Best Actress
- Omar Fierro - Best Young Lead Actor
- Luis Miguel - Outstanding Male Singer
