= Cenizas y diamantes =

Mexican telenovela

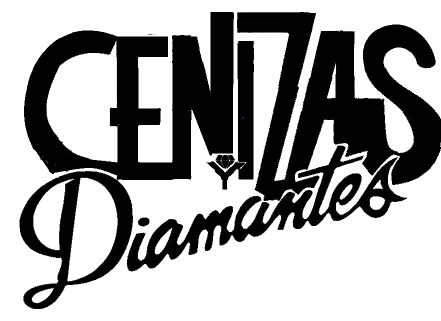
- Genre: Telenovela
- Created by: Paulino Sabugal
- Written by: Josefina Palos
- Directed by: Luis Vélez
- Starring: Ernesto Laguardia; Lola Merino; Sergio Bustamante; Guillermo Murray; Silvia Mariscal; Héctor Ortega; Marta Aura
- Opening theme: Mazurka by Aram Khachaturian
- Ending theme: Nunca voy a olvidarte by Cristian Castro
- Country of origin: Mexico
- Original language: Spanish
- No. of episodes: 175

Production
- Executive producer: Eugenio Cobo
- Production locations: Mexico City, Mexico
- Cinematography: Manuel Ruiz Esparza
- Running time: 21-22 minutes (episodes 1-165); 41-44 minutes (episodes 166-175)
- Production company: Televisa

Original release
- Network: Canal de las Estrellas
- Release: June 4, 1990 – January 18, 1991

Related
- Carrusel (18:30) La fuerza del amor (18:00); Alcanzar una estrella II

Cenizas y diamantes (English title: Ashes & diamonds) is a Mexican telenovela produced by Eugenio Cobo for Televisa in 1990. The story is inspired by the story of Cinderella.

It starred Ernesto Laguardia and Lola Merino, with Sergio Bustamante, Guillermo Murray, Silvia Mariscal and Héctor Ortega.

== Cast ==
- Ernesto Laguardia as Julián Gallardo
- Lola Merino as Celeste Ortiz
- Sergio Bustamante as Dámaso Gallardo
- Guillermo Murray as Felipe Ortiz
- Silvia Mariscal as Andrea de Ortiz
- Héctor Ortega as Gabino Ortiz
- Marta Aura as Amparo del Bosque
- Irlanda Mora as Emma
- Elizabeth Dupeyrón as Sor Fátima
- Alejandra Procuna as Cynthia Ortiz
- Elizabeth Ávila as Bárbara Ortiz
- Germán Bernal as Pepe
- Raúl Magaña as Freddy
- Sergio Sánchez as Manuel
- Juan Antonio Aspe as Néstor Gallardo
- Evelyn Solares as Madre Superiora
- Eugenio Cobo as Tomás
- Ricardo de Pascual Jr.
- Genoveva Pérez as Antonia
- Joaquín Garrido as Garnica
- Luis Tenorio Vega as Abogado
- Humberto Yáñez as Abulón
- Gustavo Aguilar as Manotas
- Gustavo Cuevas as Tractor
- Jorge Alberto Bolaños as Benjamín
- Luz Adriana as Refugio
- Graciela Bernardos as Escalante
- Joana Brito as Arévalo
- Maru Dueñas as Cuquín
- Georgina Pedret as Rita
- Fernando Colunga
- Xavier Ximénez
- Julio Barquin

== Awards ==
Year	Award	Category	Nominee	Result
1991	9th TVyNovelas Awards	Best Antagonist Actor	Sergio Bustamante	Nominated
1991	9th TVyNovelas Awards	Best Young Lead Actress	Lola Merino	Nominated
1991	9th TVyNovelas Awards	Best Young Lead Actor	Ernesto Laguardia	Nominated
1991	9th TVyNovelas Awards	Best Female Revelation	Alejandra Procuna	Nominated
1991	9th TVyNovelas Awards	Best Child Performance	Ricardo de Pascual Jr.	Nominated
