= TVyNovelas Award for Best Leading Actor =

Mexican television award

- Awarded for: Best performance by an actor in a leading role
- First award: 1986; Carlos Ancira †; Vivir un poco
- Currently held by: 2020; Alberto Estrella; Vencer el miedo

== Winners and nominees ==
=== 1980s ===
Winner	Nominated
4th TVyNovelas Awards
Carlos Ancira for Vivir un poco	Augusto Benedico for Vivir un poco; Miguel Manzano for Tú o nadie; Rafael Inclán for Vivir un poco
5th TVyNovelas Awards
Carlos Ancira for El camino secreto	Julio Alemán for Cautiva; Sergio Ramos "El Comanche" for Seducción; Tony Carbajal for Lista negra
6th TVyNovelas Awards
Ernesto Gómez Cruz for Tal como somos	Ignacio López Tarso for Senda de gloria; Miguel Manzano for Victoria
7th TVyNovelas Awards
Joaquín Cordero for Amor en silencio	Jorge Martínez de Hoyos for El pecado de Oyuki; Tony Carbajal for El rincón de los prodigios

=== 1990s ===
Winner	Nominated
8th TVyNovelas Awards
Ernesto Alonso for Lo blanco y lo negro	
9th TVyNovelas Awards
Jorge Russek for Días sin luna	Enrique Lizalde for Alcanzar una estrella; Eric del Castillo for Cuando llega el amor; Ignacio López Tarso for Ángeles blancos; Miguel Manzano for Yo compro esa mujer
10th TVyNovelas Awards
Tony Carbajal for Milagro y magia	Fernando Luján for Cadenas de amargura; Jorge Lavat for Muchachitas
11th TVyNovelas Awards
Jorge Martínez de Hoyos for El abuelo y yo	Enrique Álvarez Félix for La sonrisa del Diablo; Joaquín Cordero for Baila conmigo
12th TVyNovelas Awards
Enrique Rocha for Dos mujeres, un camino	Enrique Lizalde for Corazón salvaje; Joaquín Cordero for Los parientes pobres
13th TVyNovelas Awards
Ignacio López Tarso for Imperio de cristal	Alberto Vásquez for Agujetas de color de rosa; Tito Guizar for Marimar
14th TVyNovelas Awards
Enrique Lizalde for Si Dios me quita la vida	Eric del Castillo for Alondra; Guillermo Murray for Lazos de Amor
15th TVyNovelas Awards
Jorge Russek for Cañaveral de pasiones	Carlos Bracho for La sombra del otro; Pedro Armendáriz Jr. for La culpa
16th TVyNovelas Awards
Jorge Russek for Huracán	Enrique Lizalde for Esmeralda; Fernando Luján for Mirada de mujer
17th TVyNovelas Awards
José Carlos Ruiz for Soñadoras	Eric del Castillo for La mentira

=== 2000s ===
Winner	Nominated
18th TVyNovelas Awards
Eric del Castillo for Mujeres engañadas	Joaquín Cordero for Por tu amor; Roberto "Flaco" Guzmán for Rosalinda
19th TVyNovelas Awards
Joaquín Cordero for Abrázame muy fuerte	César Évora for Abrázame muy fuerte; Ignacio López Tarso for La casa en la playa
20th TVyNovelas Awards
Eric del Castillo for Amigas y rivales	Aarón Hernán for Salomé; Manuel Ojeda for El Manantial
21st TVyNovelas Awards
Ignacio López Tarso for De pocas, pocas pulgas	Eric del Castillo for Niña amada mía; José Carlos Ruiz for Las Vías del Amor
22nd TVyNovelas Awards
Carlos Cámara for Amor Real	José Carlos Ruiz for Mariana de la noche; Sergio Ramos «El Comanche» for Amarte es mi Pecado
~~2005~~
24th TVyNovelas Awards
Manuel Ojeda for Alborada	Joaquín Cordero for La Madrastra; Luis Bayardo for La esposa virgen; Raúl Padilla "Choforo" for Sueños y caramelos
25th TVyNovelas Awards
Eric del Castillo and Julio Alemán for La Verdad Oculta	Carlos Bracho for La fea más bella; Enrique Lizalde for Heridas de amor; José Carlos Ruiz for Amar sin limites
26th TVyNovelas Awards
Germán Robles for Pasión	Héctor Sáez for Bajo las riendas del amor; Julio Alemán for Destilando Amor
27th TVyNovelas Awards
Manuel "Flaco" Ibáñez for Las tontas no van al cielo	Manuel Ojeda for Tormenta en el paraíso; Rafael Inclán for Alma de hierro

=== 2010s ===
Winner	Nominated
28th TVyNovelas Awards
Luis Gimeno for Mañana es para siempre	Enrique Rocha for Corazón salvaje; Sergio Goyri for Mi pecado
29th TVyNovelas Awards
Alejandro Camacho for Para volver a amar	Eric del Castillo for Soy tu dueña; José Elías Moreno for Niña de mi corazón; Juan Ferrara for Mar de amor
30th TVyNovelas Awards
César Évora for Triunfo del amor	Enrique Rocha for Una familia con suerte; Fernando Allende for Esperanza del corazón; Rogelio Guerra for Rafaela
31st TVyNovelas Awards
Alejandro Camacho for Abismo de pasión	José Elías Moreno for Amor bravío; Manuel Ojeda for Por ella soy Eva
32nd TVyNovelas Awards
Jesús Ochoa for Libre para amarte	Ignacio López Tarso for Corazón indomable; Patricio Castillo for Mentir para vivir
33rd TVyNovelas Awards
Manuel "Flaco" Ibáñez for Qué pobres tan ricos	José Elías Moreno for Quiero amarte; Manuel Ojeda for La Gata; René Casados for Mi corazón es tuyo
34th TVyNovelas Awards
Arturo Peniche for A que no me dejas	Ignacio Lopez Tarso for Amores con trampa; Manuel "Flaco" Ibáñez for Antes muerta que Lichita; Carlos Bracho for La vecina; Luis Bayardo for Pasión y poder
35th TVyNovelas Awards
César Évora for Las amazonas	Alexis Ayala for Corazón que miente; Jesús Ochoa for El hotel de los secretos; Patricio Castillo for La candidata; Eric del Castillo for Tres veces Ana
36th TVyNovelas Awards
Juan Carlos Barreto for Papá a toda madre	Adalberto Parra for Caer en tentación; Alejandro Tomassi for La doble vida de Estela Carrillo; Enrique Rocha for Me declaro culpable; José Carlos Ruiz for Mi adorable maldición
37th TVyNovelas Awards
Alexis Ayala for Amar a muerte	Omar Fierro for Hijas de la luna; Patricio Castillo for Mi marido tiene familia; Rafael Inclán for Mi marido tiene familia; Guillermo García Cantú for Por amar sin ley

=== 2020s ===
Winner	Nominated
38th TVyNovelas Awards
Alberto Estrella for Vencer el miedo	César Évora for Ringo; Guillermo García Cantú for Por amar sin ley; José Elías Moreno Jr. for Médicos; Juan Carlos Barreto for La usurpadora

== Records ==
- Most awarded actors: Ignacio López Tarso and Eric del Castillo, 3 times.
- Most nominated actors: Eric del Castillo with 9 nominations.
- Actors who have won all nominations: Alejandro Camacho, Carlos Ancira, Manuel "Flaco" Ibáñez, Jorge Russek and César Évora 2 times.
- Most nominated actors without a win: Miguel Manzano, Carlos Bracho and José Elías Moreno with 3 nominations.
- Youngest winner: César Évora, 52 years old.
- Youngest nominee: César Évora, 42 years old.
- Oldest winner: Luis Gimeno, 83 years old.
- Oldest nominee: Ignacio López Tarso, 91 years old.
- Actors winning after short time: Carlos Ancira by (Vivir un poco, 1986) and (El camino secreto, 1987), 2 consecutive years.
- Actors winning after long time: Joaquín Cordero by (Amor en silencio, 1989) and (Abrázame muy fuerte, 2001), 12 years difference.
- Actors that winning the award for the same role:
  - Jorge Martínez de Hoyos (El abuelo y yo, 1993) and Ignacio López Tarso (De pocas, pocas pulgas, 2003)
  - Joaquín Cordero (Amor en silencio, 1989) and Arturo Peniche (A que no me dejas, 2016)
- Actors nominated for the same role without winning:
  - Augusto Benedico (Vivir un poco, 1985) and Joaquín Cordero (La madrastra, 2005)
  - Tito Guízar (Marimar, 1994) and Ignacio López Tarso (Corazón indomable, 2013)
- Actors winning this category, despite having been as a main villain:
  - Carlos Ancira (Vivir un poco, 1986)
  - Joaquín Cordero (Amor en silencio, 1989)
  - Enrique Rocha (Dos mujeres, un camino, 1994)
  - José Carlos Ruiz (Soñadoras, 1999)
  - Carlos Cámara (Amor real, 2004)
  - Julio Alemán (La verdad oculta, 2007)
  - Arturo Peniche (A que no me dejas, 2016)
- Actors was nominated in this category, despite having played as a main villain:
  - Sergio Ramos "El Comanche" (Seducción, 1987)
  - Pedro Armendáriz, Jr. (La culpa, 1997)
  - Enrique Lizalde (Esmeralda, 1998)
  - César Évora (Abrázame muy fuerte, 2001)
  - Eric del Castillo (Niña amada mía, 2003)
  - Sergio Goyri (Mi pecado, 2010)
  - Enrique Rocha (Corazón salvaje, 2010)
  - Manuel Ojeda (Por ella soy Eva, 2013)
- Foreign winning actors:
  - Carlos Cámara from Dominican Republic
  - Germán Robles from Spain
  - Luis Gimeno from Uruguay
  - César Évora from Cuba
  - Alexis Ayala from United States
