= TVyNovelas Award for Best Young Lead Actress =

Mexican television award

- Awarded for: Best performance by a younger actress in a leading role
- First award: 1985; Victoria Ruffo; La fiera
- Currently held by: 2019; Bárbara López; Amar a muerte

== Winners and nominees ==
=== 1980s ===
Winner	Nominated
3rd TVyNovelas Awards
Victoria Ruffo for La fiera	Alma Delfina for Guadalupe; Laura Flores for Los años felices
4th TVyNovelas Awards
Luz María Jerez for Tú o nadie	Alma Delfina for Vivir un poco; Delia Casanova for De pura sangre; Liliana Abud for Tú o nadie
5th TVyNovelas Awards
Leticia Calderón for La indomable	Adela Noriega for Yesenia; Magda Karina for Cicatrices del alma; Patricia Pereyra for Pobre juventud
6th TVyNovelas Awards
Adela Noriega for Quinceañera	Gabriela Ruffo for Victoria; Graciela Mauri for Cómo duele callar
7th TVyNovelas Awards
Erika Buenfil for Amor en silencio	Alma Delfina for El rincón de los prodigios; Mariagna Prats for Pasión y poder

=== 1990s ===
Winner	Nominated
8th TVyNovelas Awards
Adela Noriega for Dulce Desafío	Daniela Castro for Mi segunda madre; Patricia Pereyra for Teresa
9th TVyNovelas Awards
Lucero for Cuando llega el amor	Ana Colchero for Destino; Angélica Rivera for Mi pequeña Soledad; Daniela Castro for Días sin luna; Lola Merino for Cenizas y diamantes
10th TVyNovelas Awards
Daniela Castro for Cadenas de amargura	Chantal Andere for Madres egoístas; Mariana Levy for La Pícara Soñadora
11th TVyNovelas Awards
Thalía for María Mercedes	Bibi Gaytán for Baila conmigo; Itatí Cantoral for De frente al sol
12th TVyNovelas Awards
Lucero for Los parientes pobres	Arcelia Ramírez for Más allá del puente; Itatí Cantoral for Dos mujeres, un camino
13th TVyNovelas Awards
Kate del Castillo for Imperio de cristal	Gabriela Hassel for Agujetas de color de rosa; Karla Álvarez for Prisionera de amor
14th TVyNovelas Awards
Ludwika Paleta for María la del barrio	Anahí for Alondra; Karla Talavera for Lazos de Amor
15th TVyNovelas Awards
Verónica Merchant for Luz Clarita	
16th TVyNovelas Awards
Adela Noriega for María Isabel	Kate del Castillo for Alguna vez tendremos alas; Mercedes Molto for Mi querida Isabel
17th TVyNovelas Awards
Adela Noriega for El Privilegio de Amar	Irán Castillo for Preciosa; Kate del Castillo for La mentira

=== 2000s ===
Winner	Nominated
18th TVyNovelas Awards
Karyme Lozano for Tres mujeres	Ivonne Montero for Rosalinda; Lisette Morelos for Alma rebelde
~~2001 to 2005~~
24th TVyNovelas Awards
Dulce María for Rebelde	Anahí for Rebelde; Ana Layevska for La madrastra; Sherlyn for Alborada
~~2007 and 2008~~
27th TVyNovelas Awards
Maite Perroni for Cuidado con el ángel	Allisson Lozz for Al diablo con los guapos; Danna Paola for Querida Enemiga

=== 2010s ===
Winner	Nominated
28th TVyNovelas Awards
Danna Paola for Atrévete a soñar	Angelique Boyer for Corazón salvaje; Maite Perroni for Mi pecado
29th TVyNovelas Awards
Paulina Goto for Niña de mi Corazón	Gaby Mellado for Zacatillo, un lugar en tu corazón; Renata Notni for Mar de amor
30th TVyNovelas Awards
Livia Brito for Triunfo del amor	Claudia Álvarez for Dos hogares; Gaby Mellado for Amorcito corazón; Thelma Madrigal for Esperanza del corazón
31st TVyNovelas Awards
Livia Brito for Abismo de pasión	Esmeralda Pimentel for Cachito de cielo; Mariana Van Rankin for Amor bravío
32nd TVyNovelas Awards
Sherlyn for Amores Verdaderos	Michelle Renaud for La mujer del Vendaval; Thelma Madrigal for La mujer del Vendaval
33rd TVyNovelas Awards
Paulina Goto for Mi corazón es tuyo	Estefanía Villarreal for Yo no creo en los hombres; Michelle Renaud for El color de la pasión; Natasha Dupeyrón for Qué pobres tan ricos
34th TVyNovelas Awards
Wendy González for Antes muerta que Lichita	Gabriela Carrillo for Amor de barrio; Scarlet Dergal for Amores con trampa; Thelma Madrigal for La sombra del pasado; Alejandra García for Que te perdone Dios
35th TVyNovelas Awards
Renata Notni for Sueño de amor	Karla Farfán for La candidata; Mariluz Bermúdez for Las amazonas; Sachi Tamashiro for Tres veces Ana; Sofía Castro for Vino el amor
36th TVyNovelas Awards
Ela Velden for Caer en tentación	Claudia Martín for Enamorándome de Ramón; Yanni Prado for La doble vida de Estela Carrillo; Fernanda Urdapilleta for Papá a toda madre; Scarlet Gruber for Sin tu mirada
37th TVyNovelas Awards
Bárbara López for Amar a muerte	Ale Müller for Like; Macarena García for Like; Roberta Damián for Like; Jade Fraser for Mi marido tiene familia

== Records ==
- Most awarded actress: Adela Noriega, 4 times.
- Most nominated actress: Adela Noriega with 5 nominations.
- Most nominated actress without a win: Alma Delfina and Thelma Madrigal with 3 nominations.
- Actress who have won all nominations: Lucero, Paulina Goto and Livia Brito, 2 times.
- Youngest winner: Danna Paola, 14 years old.
- Youngest nominee: Anahí, 13 years old.
- Oldest winner: Verónica Merchant, 33 years old.
- Oldest nominees: Delia Casanova and Liliana Abud, 37 years old.
- Actress winning after short time:
  - Adela Noriega by (María Isabel, 1998) and (El Privilegio de Amar, 1999), 2 consecutive years.
  - Livia Brito by (Triunfo del amor, 2012) and (Abismo de pasión, 2013), 2 consecutive years.
- Actress winning after long time: Paulina Goto by (Niña de mi Corazón, 2011) and (Mi corazón es tuyo, 2015), 4 years difference.
- Actress was nominated in this category, despite having played as a main villain:
  - Ana Colchero (Destino, 1991)
  - Itatí Cantoral (De frente al sol, 1993)
  - Esmeralda Pimentel (Cachito de cielo, 2013)
  - Thelma Madrigal (La sombra del pasado, 2016)
- Foreign winning actress:
  - Ludwika Paleta from Poland
  - Livia Brito from Cuba
