= TVyNovelas Award for Best Young Lead Actor =

Mexican television award

- Awarded for: Best performance by a younger actor in a leading role
- First award: 1985; Guillermo Capetillo; La fiera
- Currently held by: 2019; Santiago Achaga; Like

== Winners and nominees ==
=== 1980s ===
Winner	Nominated
3rd TVyNovelas Awards
Guillermo Capetillo for La fiera	Jaime Garza for Guadalupe; Manuel Saval for Los años felices
4th TVyNovelas Awards
Juan Antonio Edwards for Vivir un poco	Arturo Peniche for Vivir un poco; Eduardo Palomo for El ángel caído; Jaime Garza for Vivir un poco
5th TVyNovelas Awards
Alberto Mayagoitia for Pobre juventud	Eduardo Palomo for Lista negra; Guillermo García Cantú for El engaño; Manuel Saval for Muchachita
6th TVyNovelas Awards
Ernesto Laguardia for Quinceañera	Edgardo Gazcón for Cómo duele callar; Luis Xavier for Victoria
7th TVyNovelas Awards
Ernesto Laguardia for Flor y canela	Demián Bichir for El rincón de los prodigios; Omar Fierro for Amor en silencio

=== 1990s ===
Winner	Nominated
8th TVyNovelas Awards
Eduardo Yáñez for Dulce desafío	Guillermo García Cantú for La casa al final de la calle; Miguel Pizarro for Teresa
9th TVyNovelas Awards
Omar Fierro for Cuando llega el amor	Ari Telch for La fuerza del amor; Armando Araiza for Un rostro en mi pasado; Ernesto Laguardia for Cenizas y diamantes; Rafael Rojas for Mi pequeña Soledad
10th TVyNovelas Awards
Raúl Araiza for Cadenas de amargura	Eduardo Palomo for La Pícara Soñadora; Toño Mauri for Madres egoístas
11th TVyNovelas Awards
Eduardo Santamarina for De frente al sol	Eduardo Capetillo for Baila conmigo; Rafael Rojas for Baila conmigo
12th TVyNovelas Awards
Rodrigo Vidal for Dos mujeres, un camino	Eduardo Santamarina for Más allá del puente; Pedro Fernández for Buscando el paraíso
13th TVyNovelas Awards
Germán Gutiérrez for Imperio de cristal	Alexis Ayala for Agujetas de color de rosa; Gerardo Hemmer for Prisionera de amor
14th TVyNovelas Awards
Osvaldo Benavides for María la del barrio	Arath de la Torre for Caminos cruzados; Daniel Zamora for María José
~~1997~~
16th TVyNovelas Awards
Osvaldo Benavides for Te sigo amando	Arath de la Torre for Mi pequeña traviesa; René Strickler for Alguna vez tendremos alas
17th TVyNovelas Awards
Guy Ecker for La mentira	Mauricio Islas for Preciosa; René Strickler for El privilegio de amar

=== 2000s ===
Winner	Nominated
18th TVyNovelas Awards
Kuno Becker for Mujeres engañadas	Aitor Iturrioz for Por tu amor; Eduardo Verástegui for Alma rebelde
~~2001 to 2005~~
24th TVyNovelas Awards
Mauricio Aspe for La madrastra	Alfonso Herrera for Rebelde; Christopher von Uckermann for Rebelde; José Luis Reséndez for La madrastra
25th TVyNovelas Awards
Imanol Landeta for Código postal	Erick Guecha for La fea más bella
~~2008~~
27th TVyNovelas Awards
Eleazar Gómez for Las tontas no van al cielo	Eugenio Siller for Al diablo con los guapos; José Ron for Juro Que Te Amo

=== 2010s ===
Winner	Nominated
28th TVyNovelas Awards
José Ron for Los exitosos Pérez	Eleazar Gómez for Atrévete a soñar; Gonzalo García Vivanco for Verano de amor
29th TVyNovelas Awards
Alfonso Dosal for Para volver a amar	Diego Amozurrutia for Llena de amor; Eleazar Gómez for Cuando me enamoro
30th TVyNovelas Awards
Osvaldo de León for Una familia con suerte	Alejandro Speitzer for Esperanza del corazón; Brandon Peniche for Ni contigo ni sin ti; Diego Amozurrutia for Amorcito corazón
31st TVyNovelas Awards
Ferdinando Valencia for Por Ella Soy Eva	Eddy Vilard for Amor bravío; Pablo Lyle for Cachito de cielo
32nd TVyNovelas Awards
Alejandro Speitzer for Mentir para vivir	Eleazar Gómez for Amores verdaderos; Ricardo Franco for Corazón indomable
33rd TVyNovelas Awards
José Eduardo Derbez for Qué pobres tan ricos	Brandon Peniche for La malquerida; Juan Pablo Gil for Mi corazón es tuyo; Pablo Lyle for Por siempre mi amor
34th TVyNovelas Awards
Brandon Peniche for Que te perdone Dios	Alfonso Dosal for A que no me dejas; Paul Stanley for Amor de barrio; Diego de Erice for La sombra del pasado; Alfredo Gatica for La vecina
35th TVyNovelas Awards
Polo Morín for Sueño de amor	Josh Gutiérrez for El hotel de los secretos; Federico Ayos for La candidata; Juan Pablo Gil for Las amazonas; José Pablo Minor for Sin rastro de ti
36th TVyNovelas Awards
Germán Bracco for Caer en tentación	Emmanuel Palomares for En tierras salvajes; Álex Perea for La doble vida de Estela Carrillo; Juan Diego Covarrubias for Me declaro culpable; Emmanuel Orenday for Sin tu mirada
37th TVyNovelas Awards
Santiago Achaga for Like	Gonzalo Peña for Amar a muerte; Carlos Said for Like; Mauricio Abad for Like; Emilio Osorio for Mi marido tiene familia

== Records ==
- Most awarded actor: Ernesto Laguardia and Osvaldo Benavides, 2 times.
- Most awarded actor (ever winner): Osvaldo Benavides, 2 times.
- Most nominated actor: Ernesto Laguardia and Eleazar Gómez with 4 nominations.
- Most nominated actor without a win: Eduardo Palomo with 3 nominations.
- Youngest winner: Osvaldo Benavides, 17 years old.
- Youngest nominee: Alejandro Speitzer, 16 years old.
- Oldest winner: Guy Ecker, 40 years old.
- Oldest nominee: René Strickler, 36 years old.
- Actors winning after short time: Ernesto Laguardia by (Quinceañera, 1988) and (Flor y canela, 1989), 2 consecutive years.
- Actors winning after long time: Osvaldo Benavides by (María la del barrio, 1996) and (Te sigo amando, 1998), 2 years difference.
- Actors winning this category, despite having been as a main villain: Rodrigo Vidal (Dos mujeres, un camino, 1994)
- Actors was nominated in this category, despite having played as a main villain: Rafael Rojas (Baila conmigo, 1993)
- Foreign winning actors:
  - Guy Ecker from Brazil
  - Osvaldo de León from United States
  - Santiago Achaga from Argentina
