= TVyNovelas Award for Best Child Performance =

Mexican television award

- Awarded for: Best performance by a child actor or actress
- First award: 1983; Lucero; Chispita & Carlos Espejel; Chiquilladas
- Currently held by: 2008; Octavio Ocaña; Lola...Érase una vez

== Winners and nominees ==
=== 1980s ===
Winner	Nominated
1st TVyNovelas Awards
Lucero for Chispita and Carlos Espejel for Chiquilladas	
2nd TVyNovelas Awards
Ana Patricia Rojo and Armando Araiza for El maleficio	
3rd TVyNovelas Awards
Nayelli Saldívar for Guadalupe and Carlos Espejel for Chiquilladas	
4th TVyNovelas Awards
Nayelli Saldívar for Esperándote	Ginny Hoffman for Chiquilladas; Ivonne e Ivette for Chiquilladas; Pituka and Petaka for Chiquilladas
~~1987~~
6th TVyNovelas Awards
Pierre Angelo for Chiquilladas	
~~1989~~

=== 1990s ===
Winner	Nominated
8th TVyNovelas Awards
Ludwika Paleta and Jorge Granillo for Carrusel	Alejandra Gollas for Mi segunda madre; Flor Mariana for Mi segunda madre; Joseph Birch for Carrusel; Óscar Vallejo for Teresa
9th TVyNovelas Awards
Jair de Rubín for Días sin luna	Alejandro Gaytán for Días sin luna; Erick Sánchez for Destino; Karen Beatriz for Destino; Ricardo de Pascual Jr. for Cenizas y diamantes
10th TVyNovelas Awards
Luis Guillermo Martel for La picara soñadora	Anahí for Madres egoístas; José María Torre for Amor de nadie
11th TVyNovelas Awards
Gael García Bernal and Ludwika Paleta for El abuelo y yo	Alfredo Gutiérrez for María Mercedes; Flor Edwarda Gurrola for El abuelo y yo; Luis Guillermo Martell for Carrusel de las Américas
~~1994~~
13th TVyNovelas Awards
Marisol Centeno for Agujetas de color de rosa	Alan Fernando for Imperio de cristal; Alisa Vélez for Prisionera de amor; Felipe Colombo for Agujetas de color de rosa; Zoraida Gómez for Imperio de cristal
~~1996~~
15th TVyNovelas Awards
Daniela Luján for Luz Clarita	Eleazar Gómez for Luz Clarita; Paula Sánchez for La culpa
~~1998 and 1999~~

=== 2000s ===
Winner	Nominated
~~2000~~
19th TVyNovelas Awards
Belinda for Amigos x siempre	Daniela Aedo for Carita de Ángel
~~2002 to 2005~~
24th TVyNovelas Awards
Danna Paola for Pablo y Andrea	Maracena Miguel for Sueños y caramelos; Nashla Aguilar for Sueños y caramelos; Sebastián for La esposa virgen
~~2007~~
TVyNovelas Awards
Octavio Ocaña for Lola...Érase una vez	Danna Paola for Muchachitas como tú; Santiago Hernández for Plaza Sésamo

== Records ==
- Most awarded actors: Carlos Espejel, Nayelli Saldívar and Ludwika Paleta, 2 times.
- Most nominated actress: Carlos Espejel with 3 nominations.
- Youngest winners: Daniela Luján and Octavio Ocaña, 9 years old.
- Youngest nominee: Daniela Aedo, 6 years old.
- Oldest winner: Pierre Angelo, 16 years old.
- Actress that won after a short time: Nayelli Saldívar by (Guadalupe, 1985) and (Esperándote, 1986), 2 consecutive years.
- Actress that won after a long time: Ludwika Paleta by (Carrusel, 1990) and (El abuelo y yo, 1993), 3 years difference.
- Actresses that won the award for the same role: Lucero (Chispita, 1982) and Daniela Luján (Luz Clarita, 1996)
- Foreign winning actress:
  - Ludwika Paleta from Poland
  - Belinda from Spain
