= Carrusel =

Mexican children's telenovela

- Gabriela Rivero and the cast's children from left to right
- Also known as: Carrusel de Niños
- Genre: Telenovela
- Written by: Lei Quintana; Gabriela Ortigoza
- Screenplay by: Valeria Phillips
- Story by: Abel Santa Cruz
- Directed by: Albino Corrales; Pedro Damián
- Starring: Gabriela Rivero; Armando Calvo
- Music by: José Antonio "Potro" Farías
- Opening theme: "Carrusel de niños" sung by the children's cast (original version) "Carro-Céu" composed by Anires Marcos and R. Vigna and performed by Super Feliz (Carrossel)
- Countries of origin: United States; Mexico
- Original language: Spanish
- No. of seasons: 1
- No. of episodes: 358

Production
- Executive producers: Verónica Pimstein; Valentín Pimstein
- Producer: Angelli Nesma Medina
- Production locations: Mexico City, Mexico
- Cinematography: Albino Corrales
- Production company: Televisa

Original release
- Network: Canal de las Estrellas
- Release: January 16, 1989 – June 1, 1990

Related
- Carrusel de las Américas; ¡Vivan los niños!; Carrossel

Carrusel (Spanish pronunciation: [karuˈsel]) is a Mexican children's telenovela produced by Valentín Pimstein for Televisa. Based on the Argentinean character Jacinta Pichimahuida (first televised in 1966), it was originally broadcast on Televisa from 16 January 1989 to 1 June 1990. It covers daily life in a Mexican elementary school and the children's relationships with a charismatic teacher named Ximena. Among other plot devices, it deals with the differences between the upper and lower classes of Mexican society – specifically as seen in a romantic relationship between Cirilo, a poor black boy, and a spoiled white rich girl, Maria Joaquina Villaseñor.

Gabriela Rivero starred as main protagonist, while Janet Ruiz and Beatriz Moreno starred as main antagonists. Ludwika Paleta, Pedro Javier Viveros, Hilda Chávez, Flor Eduarda Gurrola, Joseph Birch, Abraham Pons, Mauricio Armando, Gabriel Castañon, Yoshiki Takiguchi, Manuel Fernández, Karin Nisembaum, and Silvia Guzmán starred as stellar performances.

A Brazilian version, titled Carrossel, aired on SBT from 20 May 1991 to 21 April 1992, and was remade for the 2012 Brazilian remake that aired from 21 May 2012 to 26 July 2013.

== Plot ==
The story begins with the daily lives of a group of schoolchildren from a Mexican primary school ("Escuela Mundial") and the relations of the latter with their teacher, Ximena. In the series, several issues about life, while stressing values such as love, trust and friendship touched.

=== The characters ===
- Teacher Ximena Fernández is something like the embodiment of all that is good. She is a teacher, friend and mother to her students. She shows friendliness and enormous patience, and she is loved by all.
- Cirilo Rivera is a good boy, and the only child of black ancestry in school. He is the son of a humble carpenter and a housewife who adore him to the utmost.
- María Joaquina Villaseñor is a rich girl, daughter of a renowned and prestigious physician (Dr. Miguel Villaseñor). Beautiful, selfish, overlooked by her classmates, but eventually learns to value the important things in life.
- Laura Quiñones is a chubby romantic girl. She spends most of the day with a big sandwich in hand, and never misses an opportunity to let go a sigh and say, That's so romantic, or, You are very anti-romantic.
- Kokimoto Mishima is a boy of Japanese origin and the only Asian child at school. Always with his hachimaki tied around his head, he was one of the henchmen and bodyguard of Pablo Guerra in the early chapters and later was replaced on paper as right arm by Mario Pablo Ayala. His signature phrase is: "Yyyaaaaa yyyyaaaaaa!!!" (a karate battle cry).
- Bibi Smith is a girl of American origin. She is a polite and gentle girl, and a good friend. Bibi speaks Spanish imperfectly, since her native language is English.
- David Rovinovich is a Jewish boy, angelic face and curly blond hair. He wastes no time with the girls, coming to fall in love with Valeria, one of his classmates.
- Valeria Ferrer is the girlfriend of David Rovinovich. She is a cheerful girl and joker character who helps others but cannot help her joking, although not as bad as Pablo Guerra.
- Jaime Palillo is a robust, stocky, rough and clumsy child, but also very brave to come forward and defend his friends, especially Cirilo. His biggest struggle is the school subjects. He's not outstanding in his studies, but gets some recognition after.
- Pablo Guerra is the naughty boy of the class, but often his jokes go too far. He is used to annoy his sister Marcelina and play practical jokes on Cirilo.
- Marcelina Guerra is the sister of Pablo. Pablo would often make fun of her, annoy her and show the quality of dislike towards her but Marcelina still likes his brother no matter what.
- Daniel Zapata is one of the top students in the class and the leader of the "Patrulla Salvadora". He is regarded by all as a good friend and a good leader.
- Carmen Carrillo is a noble, kind, and loving girl who has to endure the difficult situations faced by her parents. However, she tries her best to succeed at school and she gets very good grades.
- Jorge del Salto is a rich boy, smug and pampered by his mother, who thinks he is superior to all children by their economic status, having empathy only for María Joaquina, who is the only one whom he considers in his class.
- Mario Ayala is a boy living with his father and stepmother, the latter an abusive woman who loves tormenting Mario by reminding him that she does not consider him his son. When he arrives at school for the first time, he responds badly to teacher Ximena who leaves the classroom crying. This causes him to be severely punished by his classmates. He later becomes the right arm of Pablo Guerra.
- Alicia Guzmán is another of the girls attending the second year of teacher Ximena, being very fond of all the girls in the classroom, and sharing many adventures with them. On one occasion, she has appendicitis, which causes her to be urgently operated on by María Joaquina's father.
- Margarita Garza is a native girl from Monterrey who came to live in Mexico City with her mother. A distinctive characteristic of hers is that she wears a different uniform from the school children in Mexico City, wearing the uniform of the headquarters of the Escuela Mundial of Monterrey, with jacket and cowboy boots.
- Clementina Suárez was a child who initially was in the second year of teacher Ximena, but had to drop out of school because her parents suffered a traffic accident and were hospitalized in Guadalajara.
- Adrián García is a chubby kid who is a member of the "Patrulla Salvadora". There are no stories about him and no information about his family. He is mostly remembered for yawning during the intro.

== Cast ==
The main characters of Carrusel

=== The children ===
- Ludwika Paleta as María Joaquina Villaseñor
- Pedro Javier Vivero as Cirilo Rivera
- Johan Sierra as Pedro Simishikis
- Joseph Birch as David Ravinovich
- Gabriel Castañón as Mario Ayala
- Hilda Chávez as Laura Quiñones
- Manuel Fernández as Adrián García
- Gina Garcia as Marcelina Guerra
- Flor Edwarda Gurrola as Carmen Carrillo
- Silvia Guzmán as Alicia Guzmán
- Jorge Granillo as Jaime Palillo
- Kristel Klitbo as Valeria Ferrer
- Ramón Valdez Urtiz as Abelardo Cruz
- Mauricio Armando as Pablo Guerra
- Karin Nisembaum as Bibi Smith
- Abraham Pons as Daniel Zapata
- Yoshiki Takiguchi as Kokimoto Mishima
- Rafael Omar as Jorge del Salto
- Alíne Bernal as Clementina Suárez

=== The adults ===
- Gabriela Rivero as Teacher Ximena Fernández
- Augusto Benedico as Don Fermín #1
- Armando Calvo as Don Fermín #2
- Odiseo Bichir as Federico Carrillo
- Rebeca Manríquez as Inés de Carrillo
- Johnny Laboriel as José Rivera
- Verónika con K as Belen de Rivera
- Arturo García Tenorio as Ramón Palillo
- Adriana Laffan as Luisa de Palillo
- Álvaro Cerviño as Dr. Miguel Villaseñor
- Karen Sentíes as Clara de Villaseñor #1
- Kenia Gascón as Clara de Villaseñor #2
- David Ostrosky as Isaac Ravinovich #1
- Gerardo Paz as Isaac Ravinovich #2
- Rossana Cesarman as Rebeca de Ravinovich
- Beatriz Moreno as Directora Felicia Orraca
- Raquel Pankowsky as Teacher Matilde Mateuche
- Alejandro Tommasi as Alberto del Salto
- Cecilia Gabriela as Roxana de del Salto
- Marcial Salinas as Germán Ayala
- Beatriz Ornella as Natalia de Ayala
- Oscar Narváez as Ricardo Ferrer
- Bárbara Córcega as Elena de Ferrer
- Ismael Larumbe as Roberto Guerra
- Erika Magnus as Isabel de Guerra
- Manuel Guízar as Sr. Marcos Morales
- Yula Pozo as Juanita
- Janet Ruiz as Teacher Susana
- Pituka de Foronda as Sara Ravinovich
- Blanca Torres as Toña
- Ada Carrasco as Aunt Matilde
- Queta Carrasco as Aunt Rosa
- Ignacio Retes as Sr. Ortiz
- Tony Carbajal as Licenciado Tomás Bobadilla
- Lupita Sandoval as Dorotea
- Ana María Aguirre as Mercedes de Fernández

== Awards ==
Year	Award	Category	Nominee	Result
1990	8th TVyNovelas Awards	Best Actress Child	Ludwika Paleta	Won
1990	8th TVyNovelas Awards	Best Actor Child	Jorge Granillo	Won
