= TVyNovelas Award for Best Actor =

Mexican television award

- Awarded for: Best performance by an actor in a protagonic role
- First award: 1983; Jorge Martínez de Hoyos †; Gabriel y Gabriela
- Currently held by: 2020; José Ron; Ringo

== Winners and nominees ==
=== 1980s ===
Winner	Nominated
1st TVyNovelas Awards
Jorge Martínez de Hoyos for Gabriel y Gabriela	Héctor Bonilla for Vanessa; Sergio Jiménez for El derecho de nacer
2nd TVyNovelas Awards
Ernesto Alonso for El maleficio	Jorge Lavat for Amor ajeno; Miguel Palmer for Bodas de odio
3rd TVyNovelas Awards
Sergio Jiménez for La traición	Héctor Bonilla for La pasión de Isabela; Jorge Vargas for La traición
4th TVyNovelas Awards
Humberto Zurita for De pura sangre	Andrés García for Tú o nadie; Rogelio Guerra for Vivir un poco; Sergio Goyri for Angélica
5th TVyNovelas Awards
Gonzalo Vega for Cuna de lobos	Héctor Bonilla for La gloria y el infierno; Manuel Landeta for Martín Garatuza; Salvador Pineda for El camino secreto
6th TVyNovelas Awards
Eduardo Yáñez for Senda de gloria	Guillermo Capetillo for Rosa salvaje; Juan Ferrara for Victoria
7th TVyNovelas Awards
Humberto Zurita for Encadenados	Arturo Peniche for Amor en silencio; Jorge Martínez for El extraño retorno de Diana Salazar

=== 1990s ===
Winner	Nominated
8th TVyNovelas Awards
Héctor Bonilla for La casa al final de la calle	Enrique Novi for Mi segunda madre; Manuel Saval for Simplemente María
9th TVyNovelas Awards
Eduardo Yáñez for Yo compro esa mujer	Alfredo Adame for La fuerza del amor; Juan Ferrara for Destino; Rogelio Guerra for Ángeles blancos; Sergio Goyri for Días sin luna
10th TVyNovelas Awards
Humberto Zurita for Al filo de la muerte	Alfredo Adame for La fuerza del amor; Fernando Allende for Amor de nadie; Sergio Goyri for Vida robada
11th TVyNovelas Awards
Arturo Peniche for María Mercedes	Eduardo Palomo for Triángulo; Juan Ferrara for Valeria y Maximiliano
12th TVyNovelas Awards
Eduardo Palomo for Corazón salvaje	Ernesto Laguardia for Los parientes pobres; Juan Ferrara for Valentina
13th TVyNovelas Awards
Humberto Zurita for El vuelo del águila	Ari Telch for Imperio de cristal; Eduardo Capetillo for Marimar
14th TVyNovelas Awards
Luis José Santander for Lazos de amor	Ernesto Laguardia for Alondra; Gonzalo Vega for Alondra
15th TVyNovelas Awards
Juan Soler for Cañaveral de pasiones	Eduardo Santamarina for Marisol; Rafael Rojas for La sombra del otro
16th TVyNovelas Awards
Sergio Goyri for Te sigo amando	Ari Telch for Mirada de mujer; Fernando Colunga for Esmeralda
17th TVyNovelas Awards
Andrés García for El privilegio de amar	Fernando Colunga for La usurpadora; Guy Ecker for La mentira

=== 2000s ===
Winner	Nominated
18th TVyNovelas Awards
Francisco Gattorno for Laberintos de pasión	Alexis Ayala for Tres mujeres; Fernando Colunga for Nunca te olvidaré
19th TVyNovelas Awards
Fernando Colunga for Abrázame muy fuerte	Ernesto Laguardia for Amigos x siempre; Jorge Salinas for Mi destino eres tú
20th TVyNovelas Awards
Mauricio Islas for El manantial	César Évora for Entre el amor y el odio; Guy Ecker for Salomé
21st TVyNovelas Awards
Juan Soler for La otra	Jorge Salinas for Las vías del amor; Sergio Goyri for Niña amada mía
22nd TVyNovelas Awards
Fernando Colunga for Amor real	Héctor Suárez for Velo de novia; Odiseo Bichir for Amarte es mi pecado
23rd TVyNovelas Awards
Eduardo Santamarina for Rubí	Gabriel Soto for Mujer de madera; Juan Soler for Apuesta por un amor
24th TVyNovelas Awards
Fernando Colunga for Alborada	César Évora for La madrastra; Juan Ferrara for Rebelde; René Strickler for Piel de otoño
25th TVyNovelas Awards
Eduardo Yáñez for La verdad oculta	Guy Ecker for Heridas de amor; Jaime Camil for La fea más bella; Rafael Amaya for Las dos caras de Ana; Valentino Lanús for Amar sin límites
26th TVyNovelas Awards
Eduardo Yáñez for Destilando amor	Eduardo Santamarina for Yo amo a Juan Querendón; Fernando Colunga for Pasión
27th TVyNovelas Awards
Alejandro Camacho for Alma de Hierro	Alejandro Ávila for Juro que te amo; Eduardo Yáñez for Fuego en la sangre; Jorge Salinas for Fuego en la sangre; Juan Soler for Palabra de mujer

=== 2010s ===
Winner	Nominated
28th TVyNovelas Awards
Pedro Fernández for Hasta que el dinero nos separe	Arturo Peniche for En nombre del amor; Fernando Colunga for Mañana es para siempre; Sebastián Rulli for Un gancho al corazón
29th TVyNovelas Awards
Fernando Colunga for Soy tu dueña	René Strickler for Para volver a amar; Sebastián Rulli for Teresa; Valentino Lanús for Llena de amor
30th TVyNovelas Awards
Jorge Salinas for La que no podía amar	Arath de la Torre for Una familia con suerte; David Zepeda for La fuerza del destino; Sergio Goyri for Dos hogares
31st TVyNovelas Awards
David Zepeda for Abismo de pasión	Cristian de la Fuente for Amor bravío; Gabriel Soto for Un refugio para el amor; Jaime Camil for Por ella soy Eva
32nd TVyNovelas Awards
Juan Diego Covarrubias for De que te quiero, te quiero	Daniel Arenas for Corazón indomable; David Zepeda for Mentir para vivir; Sebastián Rulli for Amores verdaderos
33rd TVyNovelas Awards
Sebastián Rulli for Lo que la vida me robó	Daniel Arenas for The Stray Cat; Erick Elías for El color de la pasión; Gabriel Soto for Yo no creo en los hombres; Jorge Salinas for Mi corazón es tuyo
34th TVyNovelas Awards
Pablo Lyle for La sombra del pasado	Arath de la Torre for Antes muerta que Lichita; Jorge Salinas for Pasión y poder; Juan Diego Covarrubias for La vecina; Osvaldo Benavides for A que no me dejas
35th TVyNovelas Awards
Sebastián Rulli for Tres veces Ana	Andrés Palacios for Las amazonas; Erick Elías for El hotel de los secretos; Pablo Lyle for Corazón que miente; Víctor González for La candidata
36th TVyNovelas Awards
Sebastián Rulli for Papá a toda madre	Gabriel Soto for Caer en tentación; José Ron for Enamorándome de Ramón; David Zepeda for La doble vida de Estela Carrillo; Daniel Arenas for Mi marido tiene familia
37th TVyNovelas Awards
Michel Brown for Amar a muerte	Carlos Ferro for La jefa del campeón; Arath de la Torre for Mi marido tiene familia; Daniel Arenas for Mi marido tiene familia; David Zepeda for Por amar sin ley

=== 2020s ===
Winner	Nominated
38th TVyNovelas Awards
José Ron for Ringo	Andrés Palacios for La usurpadora; Danilo Carrera for Vencer el miedo; Flavio Medina for Cuna de lobos; Gabriel Soto for Soltero con hijas; Lambda García for La reina soy yo

== Records ==
- Most awarded actors: Fernando Colunga, Eduardo Yáñez and Humberto Zurita with 4 times.
- Most nominated actor: Fernando Colunga with 9 nominations.
- Most nominated actor (never winner): Juan Ferrara with 5 nominations.
- Actors who have won all nominations: Humberto Zurita 4 times.
- Actor winning after short time:
  - Eduardo Yáñez by (La verdad oculta, 2007) and (Destilando amor, 2008), 2 consecutive years.
  - Sebastián Rulli by (Tres veces Ana, 2017) and (Papá a toda madre, 2018), 2 consecutive years.
- Actor winning after long time: Eduardo Yáñez by (Yo compro esa mujer, 1991) and (La verdad oculta, 2007), 16 years difference.
- Younger winner: Juan Diego Covarrubias, 26 years old.
- Younger nominee: Arturo Peniche, 26 years old.
- Oldest winner: Ernesto Alonso, 67 years old.
- Oldest nominee: Juan Ferrara, 63 years old.
- Actors that winning the award for the same role:
  - Sergio Goyri (Te sigo amando, 1998) and Jorge Salinas (La que no podía amar, 2012)
  - Juan Soler (Cañaveral de pasiones, 1997) and David Zepeda (Abismo de pasión, 2013)
  - Fernando Colunga (Amor Real, 2004) and Sebastián Rulli (Lo que la vida me robó, 2015)
  - Mauricio Islas (El Manantial, 2002) and Pablo Lyle (La sombra del pasado, 2016)
  - Luis José Santander (Lazos de Amor, 1996) and Sebastián Rulli (Tres veces Ana, 2017)
- Actors nominated the award for the same role:
  - Andrés García (Tú o nadie, 1985) and William Levy (Sortilegio, 2009).
  - Rogelio Guerra (Vivir un poco, 1985) and César Évora (La Madrastra, 2005).
  - Guillermo Capetillo (Rosa salvaje, 1987) and Daniel Arenas (La gata, 2014).
  - Arturo Peniche (Amor en silencio, 1988) and Osvaldo Benavides (A que no me dejas, 2015).
  - Juan Ferrara (Valeria y Maximiliano, 1991) and Guy Ecker (Heridas de Amor, 2006).
  - Eduardo Capetillo (Marimar, 1994) and Daniel Arenas (Corazón indomable, 2013).
- Actors winning this category, despite having been as a main villain: Ernesto Alonso (El maleficio, 1984), Sergio Jiménez (La traición, 1985), Sergio Goyri (Te sigo amando, 1998), and Jorge Salinas (La que no podía amar, 2012).
- Actors winning this category, has a dual role protagonist and main villain: Juan Diego Covarrubias (De que te quiero, te quiero, 2014)
- Foreign winning actors:
  - Luis José Santander from Venezuela
  - Juan Soler from Argentina
  - Andrés García from Dominican Republic
  - Francisco Gattorno from Cuba
  - Sebastián Rulli from Argentina
  - Michel Brown from Argentina
