= El rincón de los prodigios =

Mexican telenovela

- Genre: Telenovela
- Created by: Salvador García Doreste
- Written by: Salvador García Doreste; Carlos Olmos
- Directed by: Lorenzo de Rodas
- Starring: Demián Bichir; Alma Delfina; Juan Carlos Serrán; Tina Romero; Silvia Mariscal; Jorge Russek; Mercedes Pascual
- Opening theme: Pachelbel's Canon
- Country of origin: Mexico
- Original language: Spanish
- No. of episodes: 125

Production
- Executive producer: Guillermo Diazayas
- Producer: Guillermo Diazayas
- Cinematography: Luis Monroy

Original release
- Network: Canal de las Estrellas
- Release: October 26, 1987 – April 15, 1988

Related
- Pobre señorita Limantour; Dos vidas

El rincón de los prodigios (English title: The corner of the prodigies) is a Mexican telenovela produced by Guillermo Diazayas for Televisa. It aired from 1987 to 1988.

== Plot ==
The series is based mainly on the differences, between Mexican ancestral beliefs and fervent religious faith imposed by Catholicism, surrounded by mysteries, mystery and magic. Monchito has supernatural healing powers.

== Cast ==
- Demián Bichir as Monchito
- Alma Delfina as Mari
- Jorge Russek
- Silvia Mariscal as Soledad
- Tina Romero as Mercedes
- Mercedes Pascual as Rosario
- Tony Carbajal as Father Agustín
- Socorro Avelar as Martina
- Arsenio Campos as Sebastián
- Juan Carlos Serrán as Ramón
- Miguel Suárez as Father Gonzalo
- Luisa Huertas as Lucrecia
- Elizabeth Dupeyrón as Roxana
- Odiseo Bichir as Father Matías
- Christian Ramírez as Monchito (child)
- Evangelina Sosa as Mari (child)
- Carlos Ignacio as Chaparro

== Awards ==
Year	Award	Category	Nominee	Result
1989	7th TVyNovelas Awards	Best Leading Actor	Tony Carbajal	Nominated
1989	7th TVyNovelas Awards	Best Young Lead Actress	Alma Delfina	Nominated
1989	7th TVyNovelas Awards	Best Young Lead Actor	Demián Bichir	Nominated
