= Un rostro en el pasado =

Mexican telenovela

- Genre: Telenovela; Drama
- Starring: Sara García; Eduardo Fajardo; Gloria Marín
- Country of origin: Mexico
- Original language: Spanish

Production
- Running time: 42-45 minutes
- Production company: Televisa

Original release
- Network: Telesistema Mexicano
- Release: 1960 – 1960

Related
- Un rostro en mi pasado (remake)

Un rostro en el pasado is a Mexican telenovela produced by Telesistema Mexicano in 1960.

== Cast ==
- Sara García
- Gloria Marín
- Eduardo Fajardo
- Nicolás Rodríguez
- Héctor Gómez
- Dalia Íñiguez
- Magda Donato
- Julio Monterde

== Production ==
- Original Story: Fernanda Villeli
- Adaptation: Fernanda Villeli
- Direct by: Rafael Banquells
- Produced by: Colgate-Palmolive
- Producer/Director: Leopoldo Labra
