= El diario de una señorita decente =

- Genre: Telenovela; Drama
- Written by: Fernanda Villeli; Marcia Yancé
- Directed by: Alfredo Gurrola; José Ángel García
- Starring: Carmen Montejo; Manuel Garay; Eva Calvo
- Country of origin: México
- Original language: Spanish
- No. of episodes: 70

Production
- Executive producer: Ernesto Alonso

Original release
- Network: Canal 2 Telesistema Mexicano
- Release: 1969 – 1969

El diario de una señorita decente, is a Mexican telenovela produced by Ernesto Alonso for Telesistema Mexicano in 1969. Starring Carmen Montejo and Manuel Garay.

== Cast ==
- Carmen Montejo as Elena
- Manuel Garay as Román
- Eva Calvo as Virginia
- Socorro Avelar as Micaela
- Lorena Velázquez as Clotilde
- Jorge Vargas as Julio
- Yolanda Ciani as Beatriz
- César del Campo as Antonio
- Silvia Pasquel as Marie
- Tara Parra as Carla
- Oscar Morelli as Juan Manuel
