= Ángeles blancos =

Mexican telenovela

- Genre: Telenovela
- Created by: Jorge Patiño
- Written by: Jorge Patiño; José Antonio Olvera
- Directed by: Juan Carlos Muñoz
- Starring: Jacqueline Andere; Rogelio Guerra; Ignacio López Tarso; Alfonso Iturralde; Antonio Medellín; Carmelita González; Queta Lavat
- Opening theme: Spring by Antonio Vivaldi
- Country of origin: Mexico
- Original language: Spanish
- No. of episodes: 110

Production
- Executive producer: Carlos Sotomayor
- Cinematography: Albino Corrales
- Running time: 41-44 minutes
- Production company: Televisa

Original release
- Network: Canal de las Estrellas
- Release: September 3, 1990 – February 1, 1991

Related
- Días sin luna; Madres egoístas

Ángeles blancos (English title: White Angels) is a Mexican telenovela produced by Carlos Sotomayor for Televisa in 1990.

Jacqueline Andere, Rogelio Guerra and Alfonso Iturralde starred as protagonists, while Queta Lavat, Héctor Gómez and Antonio Medellín starred as antagonists. Ignacio López Tarso starred as stellar performance.

== Plot ==
Rocío Díaz de León is committed to Augusto, a Formula 2 driver. The two are married, but during their honeymoon in New York, the couple is the victim of a robbery and Augusto dies.

On the other hand, we have Jorge Pades, a pilot who has a heart attack during a flight from New York to the city of Mexico. Luckily, dew, who is a cardiologist, at the airport and given first aid, which save his life in the hospital.

Jorge and Rocío arises a difficult love, because he is already married to Martha. George recovers, but understands that his life is in danger and only a transplant could save him. Stays in the clinic of the perfect Doctor Diaz, father of dew, and you can do the delicate operation. However, while waiting for a donor, Jorge suffered a second heart attack.

== Cast ==
- Jacqueline Andere as Rocío de los Ángeles Ponce de León
- Rogelio Guerra as Jorge Pades
- Ignacio López Tarso as Perfecto Díaz de León
- Alfonso Iturralde as Augusto
- Antonio Medellín as Dr. Cardoso
- Carmelita González as Dolores
- Queta Lavat as Brígida
- Sonia Furió as Ana María
- Serrana as Martha
- Begoña Palacios as Emilia
- Myrrah Saavedra as Lucía
- Juan Carlos Bonet as Daniel
- Luis Uribe as Luis
- Gina Romand as Elena
- Irán Castillo as Biela
- Hugo Acosta as Eugenio
- Angélica Vale as Priscila
- Queta Carrasco as Josefita
- Héctor Gómez as Dr. Guzmán
- Irma Dorantes as Tina
- Mauro Giuntti as Luciano Ferrer
- Esther Guílmain as Guadalupe
- Emma Laura as Gabriela
- Ariadne Pellicer as Malena
- Juan Felipe Preciado as Humberto
- Luis Rivera as Milburgo
- José Suárez as Álvaro
- Karen Sentíes as Adriana
- Jorge Patiño as Antonio Fajardo
- María Cristina Ribal as Herminia
- Lucía Irurita as Carmelita
- Tara Parra as Remedios

== Awards and nominations ==
Year	Award	Category	Nominee	Result
1991	TVyNovelas Awards	Best Actress	Jacqueline Andere	Nominated
1991	TVyNovelas Awards	Best Actor	Rogelio Guerra	Nominated
1991	TVyNovelas Awards	Best Leading Actor	Ignacio López Tarso	Nominated
1992	Latin ACE Awards	Best Supporting Actress	Queta Lavat	Won
