= Yo compro esa mujer =

Mexican telenovela

- Genre: Telenovela
- Created by: Liliana Abud
- Based on: The Count of Monte Cristo by Alexandre Dumas
- Screenplay by: Tere Medina
- Story by: Olga Ruilópez
- Directed by: Jorge Fons
- Creative director: José Luis Garduño
- Starring: Leticia Calderón; Eduardo Yáñez; Enrique Rocha
- Music by: Jorge Avendaño
- Opening theme: "Yo compro esa mujer"
- Country of origin: Mexico
- Original language: Spanish
- No. of episodes: 160

Production
- Executive producer: Miguel Postolache
- Producer: Ernesto Alonso
- Cinematography: Jesús Acuña Lee
- Running time: 22 minutes
- Production company: Televisa

Original release
- Network: Canal de las Estrellas
- Release: January 29 – September 7, 1990

Related
- Corazón salvaje (2009)

Yo compro esa mujer (English title: I Buy That Woman) is a Mexican telenovela produced by Ernesto Alonso for Televisa in 1990. Based on the novel "The Count of Monte Cristo" by Alexandre Dumas, created by Olga Ruilópez and adapted by Liliana Abud.

The telenovela stars Leticia Calderón, Eduardo Yáñez and Enrique Rocha.

It is the first ever telenovela to be dubbed in arabic (by Lebanese TV), the success led arabic TV's to dub many telenovelas in the 90's.

== Plot ==
In Campeche, at the end of the 19th century, Rodrigo Montes de Oca (Enrique Rocha) becomes the guardian of his cousins, Matilde (Alma Muriel) and Blanca Flor (Connie de la Mora). Matilde loves Rodrigo, but he only has eyes for Blanca Flor, unaware that she is having an affair with the fisherman Enrique (Eduardo Yáñez).

When the pregnant Blanca Flor is about to enter into a secret marriage with her lover, her sister betrays her. Rodrigo interrupts the wedding, has the fisherman arrested and his cousin banished to a ranch. Matilde tells Blanca Flor that Enrique has died in prison.

This brings forward the delivery of the woman who gives birth to a son. The perverse Matilde makes her sister believe that the child has died. In reality, Rodrigo has ordered that he be left in an orphanage. Nanny Soledad (Isabela Corona) gives him to a prostitute who is Enrique's friend and who decides to raise him.

Matilde makes Rodrigo believe that her sister has died. In reality, Blanca Flor has gone mad and Matilde has locked her in the basement of the ranch. Rodrigo marries and becomes a widower. Eighteen years later, the Montes de Ocas will pay for their crimes when Alejandro (Eduardo Yáñez), Enrique and Blanca Flor's son, returns to avenge his parents.

But during his return trip, Alejandro will meet and fall in love with Ana Cristina (Leticia Calderón), without knowing that she is the daughter of Rodrigo Montes de Oca, the man responsible for his parents' misfortune. Thus, he will be torn between love and revenge.

== Cast ==
=== Main ===
- Leticia Calderón as Ana Cristina Montes de Oca
- Eduardo Yáñez as Alejandro Aldama / Alejandro San Román Montes de Oca / Enrique San Román
- Enrique Rocha as Rodrigo Montes de Oca

=== Recurring and guest stars ===
- Gerardo Acuña as Gabriel Álvarez
- Roberto Antúnez as Benigno
- Sagrario Baena as María Luisa
- Carlos Cardán as Sagón
- Mario Casillas as Raúl de Marín
- Isabela Corona as Soledad
- Connie de la Mora as Blanca Flor Montes de Oca
- Julieta Egurrola as Isabel de Marín
- Karime Favela as Gema
- Nerina Ferrer as Emilia
- Miguel Ángel Ferriz as Óscar de Malter
- Rosa Furman as Carmen
- Luz María Jeréz as Úrsula / Young Emilia
- Cynthia Klitbo as Efigenia "Efi"
- Mariana Levy as Jimena
- Miguel Manzano as Diego Álvarez
- María Marcela as Leonarda "Narda" de Marín
- Ramón Menéndez as René Vidal
- Manuel Ojeda as Santiago Aldama
- Eduardo Palomo as Federico Torres Landa
- María Regina as Mabel
- Bruno Rey as Fulgencio Castilla
- Fernando Robles as García
- Luis Xavier as Miguel de Marín
- Alma Muriel as Matilde Montes de Oca

== Awards and nominations ==
Year	Award	Category	Nominee(s)	Result
1991	TVyNovelas Awards	Best Telenovela	Ernesto Alonso	Nominated
1991	TVyNovelas Awards	Best Actress	Leticia Calderón	Nominated
1991	TVyNovelas Awards	Best Actor	Eduardo Yáñez	Won
1991	TVyNovelas Awards	Best Antagonist Actress	Alma Muriel	Nominated
1991	TVyNovelas Awards	Best Antagonist Actor	Enrique Rocha	Won
1991	TVyNovelas Awards	Best Leading Actress	Isabela Corona	Nominated
1991	TVyNovelas Awards	Best Leading Actor	Miguel Manzano	Nominated
1991	TVyNovelas Awards	Best Co-lead Actress	Mariana Levy	Won
1991	TVyNovelas Awards	Best Co-lead Actor	Luis Xavier	Nominated
1991	TVyNovelas Awards	Best Direction of the Cameras	Jesús Acuña Lee	Won
1991	TVyNovelas Awards	Best Production	Ernesto Alonso	Won
1991	Latin ACE Awards	Best Telenovela	Yo compro esa mujer	Won
1991	Latin ACE Awards	Female Figure of the Year (Actress)	Leticia Calderón	Won
1991	Latin ACE Awards	Male Figure of the Year (Actor)	Eduardo Yáñez	Won
1991	Latin ACE Awards	Best Actor	Enrique Rocha	Won
1991	Latin ACE Awards	Best Supporting Actress	Alma Muriel	Won
1991	Latin ACE Awards	Best Direction	Jorge Fons	Won
