= Cuando llega el amor =

Mexican telenovela

- Part of the cast of Cuando llega el Amor
- Genre: Telenovela
- Written by: Marcía del Río
- Story by: René Muñoz
- Directed by: Miguel Córcega; Monica Miguel
- Starring: Lucero; Omar Fierro; Irán Eory; Eric del Castillo
- Opening theme: "Cuando llega el amor" by Lucero
- Country of origin: Mexico
- Original language: Spanish
- No. of seasons: 1
- No. of episodes: 100

Production
- Executive producer: Carla Estrada
- Cinematography: Juan Rodríguez
- Production company: Televisa

Original release
- Network: Canal de las Estrellas
- Release: January 1 – May 11, 1990

Related
- Bajo las riendas del amor

Cuando llega el amor (English title: When love arrives) is a Mexican telenovela produced by Carla Estrada for Televisa in 1990.

Lucero and Omar Fierro starred as protagonists, while Nailea Norvind starred as main antagonist.

== Plot ==
Isabel Contreras (Lucero) is a privileged youngster. She is beautiful, wealthy, her parents love her, she is engaged to the handsome Rodrigo (Guillermo García) and they are going to marry once she finishes school. Alonso (Francisco Bernal), her horsemanship teacher, proposes her to represent the country in an international contest.

Isabel has an enemy in her own home, her cousin Alejandra (Nailea Norvind), who hates Isabel. Alejandra wants to harm Isabel, and she does, when she seduces Rodrigo and Isabel finds them. Isabel knows that her father would kill Alejandra if he realizes about this incident, so Isabel remains silent.

Isabel breaks her engagement without giving explanations and she finds comfort in the preparations of the next tournament. Before the contest starts, Alejandra cut the reins of the horse of Isabel provoking her tumble. Isabel injures her back and she must use crutches.

Lonely and depressed, Isabel entertains herself watching through the window to the opposite apartment. Luis Felipe (Omar Fierro), a photographer, who lives in that apartment falls in love with Isabel. Alejandra meddles once again and tries to separate them.

== Cast ==
=== Main ===
- Lucero as Isabel Contreras, daughter of Rafael and Rosalía, Alejandra's cousin, biological daughter of Alonso.
- Omar Fierro as Luis Felipe Ramírez, son of Miguel and Carmen, Ángela's brother, journalist and photographer.
- Nailea Norvind as Alejandra Contreras, Rafael's orphaned niece, hates her cousin Isabel.
- Irán Eory as Rosalía de Contreras, Rafael's wife, mother of Isabel and Lalo, former love of Alonso.
- Eric del Castillo as Don Rafael Contreras, Rosalía's husband, father of Lalo and Isabel (not biologically).

=== Supporting ===
- Francisco Bernal as Alonso Valencia, Isabel's riding instructor and biological father, former love of Rosalía.
- Miguel Pizarro as Andrés Santana, Rafael's trusted employee, in love with Alejandra.
- Guillermo García Cantú as Rodrigo Fernández Pereira, son of Gerardo and María Luisa, engaged to marry Isabel.
- Amparo Arozamena as Doña Refugio Vda. de Carrillo, Beto's grandmother, in love with Isidro.
- Raúl Buenfil as Ranas, a hoodlum, turns himself in to the police.
- Carmelita González as Carmen de Ramírez, Miguel's wife, mother of Luis Felipe and Ángela.
- Lucero Lander as Ángela Ramírez, daughter of Miguel and Carmen, Luis Felipe's sister, nurse at Gerardo's clinic.
- René Muñoz as Chucho, biological son of Nina. (Dies)
- Juan Carlos Casasola as Alberto "Beto" Carrillo, Refugio's hoodlum grandson. (Killed by Ranas)
- Polo Ortin as Don Isidro Vega, Claudia's father and Margarita's grandfather, in love with Refugio.
- Alejandra Peniche as Claudia Vega, Isidro's daughter and Margarita's mother, lover of Gerardo and Rodrigo. (Killed by María Luisa)
- Juan Felipe Preciado as Miguel Ramírez, Carmen's husband, father of Luis Felipe and Ángela.
- María Rojo as Rosa, a woman from Rafael's past.
- Evangelina Sosa as Margarita Vega, Claudia's neglected daughter and Isidro's granddaughter.
- Claudio Obregón as Dr. Gerardo Fernández, María Luisa's husband and Rodrigo's father, Claudia's lover.
- Susana Alexander as María Luisa Pereira de Fernández, Gerardo's wife and Rodrigo's mother.
- Lilia Aragón as Helena Ríos/Helen Rivers, Claudia's friend.
- Silvia Caos as Amelia, housekeeper of the Contreras family.
- Arturo Lorca as Nacho
- María Fernanda García as Paulina, Alejandra's friend.
- Surya McGregor as Dolores
- Roberto Blandón as Enrique
- Ninón Sevilla as Nina, biological mother of Chucho.
- Óscar Bonfiglio as Pablo
- Francisco Xavier as Paco
- Mónica Miguel as Yulma
- Gustavo Navarro as Fito
- Elizabeth Ávila as Julia, Isabel's friend.
- Emma Laura as Verónica, Isabel's friend.
- Lorette as Lucy
- Sergio Sendel as Chicles, a hoodlum.
- Alexis Ayala as Nicolás
- Ernesto Godoy as Güero, a hoodlum.
- Ricardo de Loera as Montero, police detective.
- Charlie Massó as Rey
- Rodrigo Vidal as Eduardo "Lalo" Contreras, son of Rafael and Rosalía, Isabel's brother.

== Awards ==
Year	Award	Category	Nominee	Result
1991	9th TVyNovelas Awards	Best Telenovela of the Year	Carla Estrada	Nominated
1991	9th TVyNovelas Awards	Best Antagonist Actress	Nailea Norvind	Nominated
1991	9th TVyNovelas Awards	Best Antagonist Actor	Miguel Pizarro	Nominated
1991	9th TVyNovelas Awards	Best Leading Actress	Susana Alexander	Nominated
1991	9th TVyNovelas Awards	Best Leading Actress	Irán Eory	Nominated
1991	9th TVyNovelas Awards	Best Leading Actor	Eric del Castillo	Nominated
1991	9th TVyNovelas Awards	Best Co-lead Actress	María Rojo	Nominated
1991	9th TVyNovelas Awards	Best Young Lead Actress	Lucero	Won
1991	9th TVyNovelas Awards	Best Young Lead Actor	Omar Fierro	Won
1991	9th TVyNovelas Awards	Best Male Revelation	Rodrigo Vidal	Nominated
1991	9th TVyNovelas Awards	Best Direction	Miguel Córcega	Won

== Reception ==
- Lucero's performance won her a TVyNovelas Award for best young lead actress. Hers was balanced with Nailea Norvind's as the villain.

== Music ==
- Lucero sang the main theme and it was a hit in that year. It was released as a special album.
- As incidental music, the song "Sirius" by The Alan Parsons Project is featured.
