= Alma grande =

1966 film

- Directed by: Chano Urueta
- Starring: Manuel López Ochoa; Sonia Infante; David Reynoso; Jorge Russek
- Release date: 1966
- Country: Mexico
- Language: Spanish

Alma grande ("Great Soul") is a 1966 Mexican film directed by Chano Urueta. It is based on the eponymous western comics series Alma Grande (1961–1973) by Pedro Zapiain and José Suarez Lozano.

== Cast ==
- Manuel López Ochoa as Alma Grande
- Sonia Infante as Norma
- David Reynoso as Sueco
- Jorge Russek as Bill Render
- Quintín Bulnes as Mike El Rubio
- José Chávez as El Pocho
- Carlos Rotzinger as Maorí
- Celia Tejeda as Norma's servant
- Víctor Alcocer as Gabino
- Nathanael León as Ojo de Águila
- Victorio Blanco
- José Dupeyrón
- Sadi Dupeyrón
- Pablo López
