= Días sin luna =

Mexican telenovela

- Genre: Telenovela
- Created by: Eric Vonn
- Written by: Eric Vonn; Mary Aragón
- Directed by: Rafael Banquells; Philippe Amand
- Starring: Angélica Aragón; Sergio Goyri; Ofelia Guilmáin; Gabriela Roel; Jorge Russek; Daniela Castro; Sylvia Pasquel
- Opening theme: Días sin luna by Amparo Rubín; Días sin luna by Grecia
- Country of origin: Mexico
- Original language: Spanish
- No. of episodes: 80

Production
- Executive producer: Juan Osorio
- Cinematography: Carlos Guerra Villareal; Roberto Nino
- Camera setup: Multi-camera
- Running time: 41-44 minutes
- Production company: Televisa

Original release
- Network: Canal de las Estrellas
- Release: May 14 – August 31, 1990

Related
- Simplemente María; Ángeles blancos

Días sin luna (English: Days Without Moon) is a Mexican telenovela produced by Juan Osorio for Televisa in 1990. Based on an original script by Eric Vonn.

Angélica Aragón, Sergio Goyri and Gabriela Roel starred as protagonists, Daniela Castro starred as co-protagonist, while the leading actress Ofelia Guilmáin starred as main antagonist. Sylvia Pasquel starred as co-antagonist.

== Cast ==
- Angélica Aragón as Lucía Álvarez
- Sergio Goyri as Andrés Monasterios
- Gabriela Roel as Silvia Parlange
- Ofelia Guilmáin as Doña Carlota Parlange Vda. de Escalante-Duval
- Sylvia Pasquel as Laura de Santamaría
- Daniela Castro as Lorena Parlange
- Jorge Russek as Rogelio Santamaría
- Gaston Tusset as Alfonso Parlange
- Lupita Sandoval as Rosario "Chayito"
- Lucía Guilmáin as Lourdes
- Juan Carlos Casasola as Gastón Solís
- Mercedes Olea as Sonia
- Maty Huitrón as Magdalena
- Zaide Silvia Gutiérrez as Irene
- Mario Iván Martínez as Jaime
- Beatriz Cecilia as Olga
- Jair de Rubín as Rodrigo Parlange
- Alejandro Gaytán as Julio Monasterio
- Magda Giner as Teresa "Tere"
- Patricia Bolaños as Marcela
- Miriam Calderón as Cirila
- John Pike as Marcial
- Alicia Brug Alcocer as Graciela "Chelita"
- David Rencoret as Rodolfo
- Berenice Domínguez as Estíbaliz
- Gloria Izaguirre
- Leonor Llausás as Clementina
- Gerardo Moscoso as Lic. Vela
- Hugo Acosta as Santiago
- Polo Salazar as Padre Enrique
- Rosita Pelayo as Clara
- Perla de la Rosa
- Yanni Contreras
- Héctor Parra

== Awards ==
| Year | Award | Category | Nominee | Result |
|---|---|---|---|---|
| 1991 | 9th TVyNovelas Awards | Best Telenovela of the Year | Juan Osorio | Nominated |
| 1991 | 9th TVyNovelas Awards | Best Actress | Angélica Aragón | Nominated |
| 1991 | 9th TVyNovelas Awards | Best Actor | Sergio Goyri | Nominated |
| 1991 | 9th TVyNovelas Awards | Best Leading Actress | Ofelia Guilmáin | Won |
| 1991 | 9th TVyNovelas Awards | Best Leading Actor | Jorge Russek | Won |
| 1991 | 9th TVyNovelas Awards | Best Young Lead Actress | Daniela Castro | Nominated |
| 1991 | 9th TVyNovelas Awards | Best Child Performance | Jair de Rubín | Won |
| 1991 | 9th TVyNovelas Awards | Best Child Performance | Alejandro Gaytán | Nominated |
