= Jorge Russek =

Mexican actor (1932–1998)

- Born: Jorge Antonio Russek Martínez; 4 January 1932; Guaymas, Sonora, Mexico
- Died: 30 July 1998 (aged 66); Mexico City, Mexico
- Occupation: Actor
- Years active: 1950–1998
- Children: 2

Jorge Antonio Russek Martínez (4 January 1932 – 30 July 1998) was a Mexican actor whose career in film and television spanned more than 40 years. A native of Guaymas, Sonora, he became one of the most prominent actors in Mexican cinema, appearing in more than 300 films in his career.

Russek appeared in Western films throughout the 1960s and 1970s, both in Mexican and American cinema, and won Ariel Awards for Best Actor in 1976 and Best Supporting Actor in 1989. While known for playing norteños, or villainous characters including gangsters, he was recognized for his humility and pleasant personality off-set. Later in his career, Russek starred in several telenovelas and was a three-time winner of the TVyNovelas Award for Best Leading Actor.

== Early life ==
Russek was born on January 4, 1932 in Guaymas, Sonora, to parents Marcos Russek Ramírez and Luisa Lily Martínez Bustamante. He had three older brothers. His mother's side of the family hailed from the state of Durango, Mexico, where his great-grandfather served as a local government official during the presidency of Benito Juárez. His father's family was of Polish Jewish origin with roots in Bolesławiec, Poland. His grandfather Marcus (or Marcos) Russek emigrated to Chihuahua from Poland in the late 1800s. Russek was raised partly in the United States and studied at the Harvard School for Boys (now Harvard-Westlake School) in North Hollywood, California.

== Career ==
=== Film ===
Russek entered the film industry as an extra in 1950. He was also a stage actor stage early in his career but quit, stating he felt asphyxiated in the dressing rooms. In 1954, Russek appeared in the Mexican-American film Sitting Bull. His first notable role was in the film La vida de Agustín Lara. Russek acted in films of various genres, but is best known for his Western film roles in the late 1960s and early 1970s, both in Mexican and American cinema. Notable American television roles include I Spy and The High Chaparral. Notable American films include The Wild Bunch (1969), Butch Cassidy and the Sundance Kid (1969), Soldier Blue (1970), Big Jake (1971), The Wrath of God (1972), and Pat Garrett and Billy the Kid (1973). He participated in these American roles while also remaining active as an actor in Mexico.

Russek won the Diosa de Plata for Best Actor in 1973 for his role in the film Todo por nada. At the 18th Ariel Awards held in 1976, he won Best Actor for his role in De todos modos Juan te llamas. Russek also won the Ariel Award for Best Supporting Actor at the 31st Ariel Awards in 1989 for his role in Los camaroneros.

=== Telenovelas ===
Russek earned his first main role in a telenovela in 1986 when he played the role of a Michoacán landowner named Don Fernando Vallarta in La gloria y el infierno, which aired on Televisa. His next main role on television was in the 1990 telenovela, Días sin luna, where he played the role of Rogelio Santamaría. For his performance, he won the TVyNovelas Award for Best Leading Actor at the 9th TVyNovelas Awards. Russek joined the cast of La fuerza del amor as Gustavo soon afterwards. He won his second TVyNovelas Award for Best Leading Actor for his performance as Samuel Aldapa in the 1996 hit telenovela, Cañaveral de Pasiones.

His final role was in Huracán, where he played the main antagonist, Néstor Villarreal, a wealthy businessman whose practices polluted the ocean. For his performance, he received the Award for Best Leading Actor at the 16th TVyNovelas Awards in May 1998.

=== Other work ===
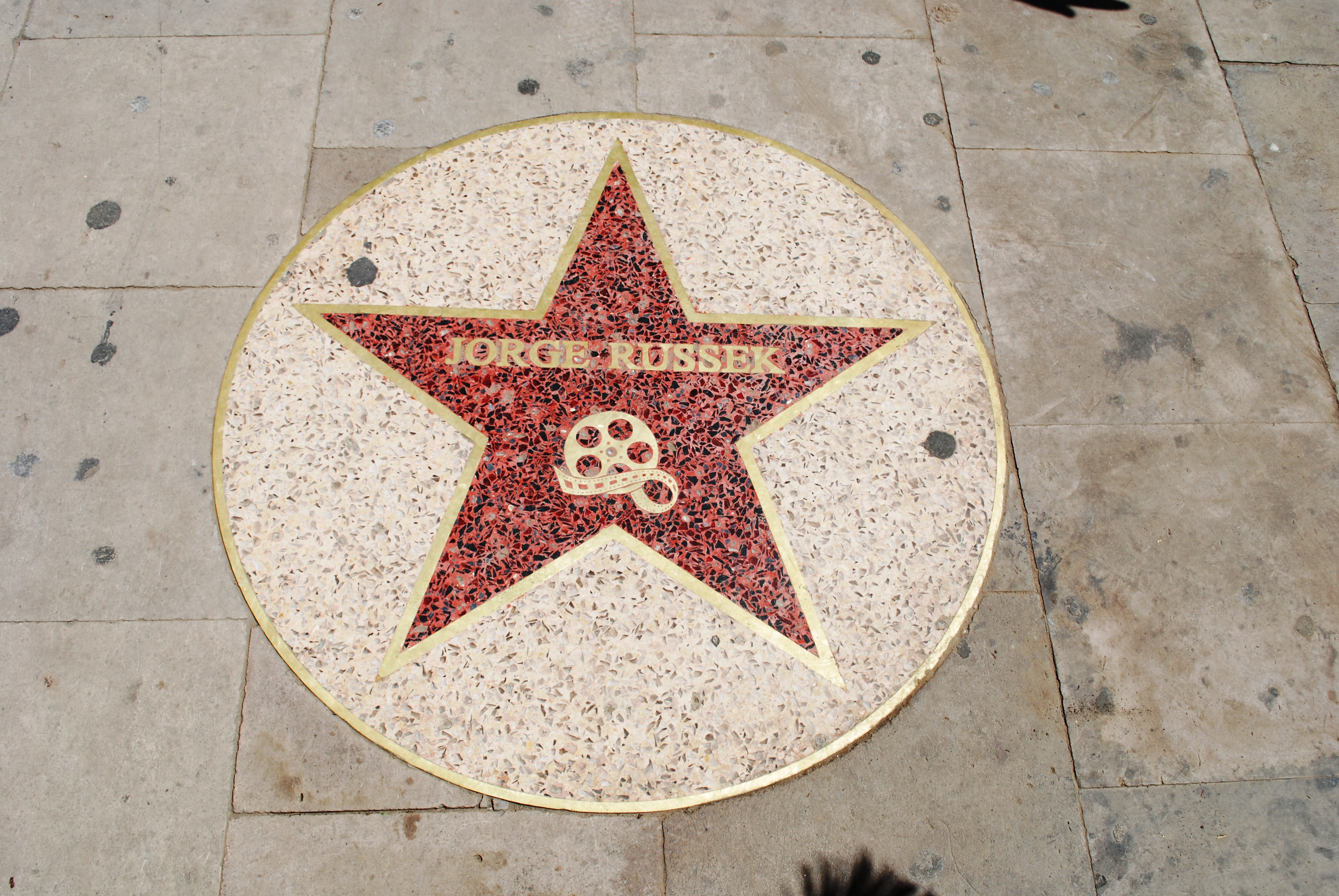
Russek's star on the Paseo de las Estrellas in Durango City

Russek was a professional photographer whose pictures were shown at various exhibitions. He often brought his Zeiss Ikon Ikoflex camera to sets he worked on. Russek was known for his pictures of natural landscapes in Durango. He also served as an advisor to the Durango Directorate of Tourism and Cinematography from 1974 to 1980 and again from 1992 to 1998. In his final years, he worked on an autobiography, which was tentatively titled Una vida de película.

== Personal life ==
Russek was married to July Elvira Sánchez. He had two children and five grandchildren.

=== Death ===
Russek died of a heart attack aged 66 on 30 July 1998 at a hospital in Mexico City. He was visited by friends such as Ernesto Alonso, Silvia Pinal, Norma Herrera, Raúl Araiza, José Rendón and José Ángel Espinoza. Per his wishes, Russek was cremated and his ashes were spread in Durango, where he filmed many of his movies.

== Legacy ==
For years to follow after his death, cultural events were held every August in his honor in Durango. Additionally, a telesecundaria in Durango was named after Russek.

In 2007, a collection of almost 2,000 pictures taken by Russek was entered into the archives of the Cineteca Nacional.

In a 2013 interview, Mario Almada stated that Russek was one of the actors he most admired.

== Filmography ==
=== Film ===
- Sitting Bull (1954)
- La odalisca No. 13 (1958)
- Villa!! (1958) – Rurale Lieutenant
- La vida de Agustín Lara (1959) – Rodolfo, coronel
- La última lucha (1959) – Amante de Delia (uncredited)
- Dos locos en escena (1960)
- The Dalton That Got Away (1960)
- ¡Mis abuelitas... nomás! (1961)
- Amor a balazo limpio (1961) – Marco Reyes
- Espiritismo (1962) – Eduardo Aguirre
- La máscara roja (1962) – Ramiro
- Los amigos Maravilla (1962)
- Los pistoleros (1962) – Martín García
- ¡En peligro de muerte! (1962) – Smith
- El monstruo de los volcanes (1963) – Valdés
- Cuando los hijos se pierden (1963) – Asaltante
- Los amigos Maravilla en el mundo de la aventura (1963)
- Las vengadoras enmascaradas (1963)
- Entre bala y bala (1963)
- La garra del leopardo (1963) – René
- Agente XU 777 (1963) – Espía
- Nos dicen las intocables (1964)
- El revólver sangriento (1964) – Secuaz de El Toro
- The Black Ghost (1964)
- El rostro de la muerte (1964) – Esbirro del rostro
- El padrecito (1964) – Matías
- El texano (1965) – Gustavo
- Nos lleva la tristeza (1965)
- El último cartucho (1965) – Cascabel
- El pueblo fantasma (1965) – El rápido
- El padre Diablo (1965) – Hermano de Lucinda
- She-Wolves of the Ring (1965) – Bronco
- La loba (1965) – Comisario
- Aquella Rosita Alvírez (1965) – Hipólito Ceija
- El tigre de Guanajuato: Leyenda de venganza (1965)
- ¡Ay Jalisco, no te rajes! (1965) – Silva Nolasco
- La maldición del oro (1965) – El Texano
- Los sheriffs de la frontera (1965)
- El hijo de Gabino Barrera (1965)
- El jinete justiciero en retando a la muerte (1966) – Hipólito
- El fugitivo (1966) – Lucas
- Alma grande (1966) – Bill Render
- La frontera sin ley (1966) – Julián Canales
- Los cuatro Juanes (1966) – Capitán
- Los malditos (1966)
- El comandante Furia (1966)
- El hijo del diablo (1966) – José Mancilla (Pepe)
- Sólo para tí (1966) – Sebastián Ramírez
- Vuelve el Texano (1966)
- El mexicano (1966)
- Rage (1966) – Himself 2nd
- La mano de Dios (1966) – Don Carlos Fuentes
- Jinetes de la llanura (1966) – José Menchaca
- Pedro Páramo (1967) – El Tilcuate
- La vuelta del Mexicano (1967)
- Alma Grande en el desierto (1967)
- El asesino se embarca (1967) – Villagrán
- Hour of the Gun (1967) – Deputy Latigo (uncredited)
- El escapulario (1968) – Don Agustín
- La ley del gavilán (1968) – Comisario
- Caballo prieto azabache (1968) – El Coyote
- Guns for San Sebastian (1968) – Pedro
- Lucio Vázquez (1968) – Coronel Guajardo
- Valentín de la Sierra (1968) – Coronel Aldape
- Pax? (1968)
- Lauro Puñales (1969) – Coronel Villegas
- El hombre de negro (1969) – Jim Williams
- The Wild Bunch (1969) – Major Zamorra
- Todo por nada (1969) – Allen Lucero
- Butch Cassidy and the Sundance Kid (1969) – Bolivian Army Officer (uncredited)
- Soldier Blue (1970) – Running Fox
- Su precio... unos dólares (1970) – El Indio
- Alguien nos quiere matar (1970) – Cristóbal
- Big Jake (1971) – Saloon Bully in Escondero (uncredited)
- Siete muertes para el texano (1971)
- Dead Aim (1971) – District Commissioner
- La mula de Cullen Baker (1971) – Sargento Jim
- Tacos al carbón (1972) – Licenciado
- The Wrath of God (1972) – Cordona
- La noche de los mil gatos (1972) – Husband
- Manuel Saldivar, el texano (1972) – Roy Vega
- Indio (1972) – Vargas
- Los indomables (1972)
- Pat Garrett and Billy the Kid (1973) – Silva
- Carne de horca (1973) – El mudo
- Adios, amor... (1973)
- ¡Quiero vivir mi vida! (1973) – Doctor Lugo
- Los doce malditos (1974) – Hawk
- Bring Me the Head of Alfredo Garcia (1974) – Cueto
- Santo y Blue Demon contra el doctor Frankenstein (1974) – Dr. Irving Frankestein
- El pistolero del diablo (1974)
- El valle de los miserables (1975) – Pancracio
- El pequeño Robin Hood (1975) – Comisario
- Sangre derramada (1975) – Coronel Páez
- México, México, ra, ra, ra (1976)
- La gran aventura del Zorro (1976) – Capitán
- Santo contra las lobas (1976)
- El buscabullas (1976) – Ronald McCree
- The Return of a Man Called Horse (1976) – Blacksmith
- Juan Armenta, el repatriado (1976) – Mr. Clayton
- El hombre del puente (1976) – El Presidente
- Longitud de guerra (1976) – Gob. y Cor. Lauro Carrillo
- De todos modos Juan te llamas (1976) – Gerardo Guajardo
- Hot Snake (1976) – Sheriff
- The Mound Builders (1976)
- Dinastía de la muerte (1977) – Daniel del Fierro Sr. / Luis del Fierro
- Los temibles (1977)
- El diabólico (1977) – Arnold Weatherbee
- Carroña (1978) – Don Lupe Zanabria
- Convoy (1978) – Tiny Alvarez
- El niño y el tiburón (1978) – Don Ramón
- Tempestad (1978)
- Tigre (1979)
- Bloody Marlene (1979) – Viejo McCutchen
- Pasión por el peligro (1979)
- Eagle's Wing (1979) – Gonzalo
- Amor a la mexicana (1979)
- En la cuerda del hambre (1979)
- Caboblanco (1980) – Minister
- Ilegales y mojados (1980) – Sr. Donoghan
- El rey de los tahures (1980) – Pedro
- Mírame con ojos pornográficos (1980) – Jorge Coro
- Emilio Varela vs Camelia la Texana (1980)
- El robo imposible (1981) – Don Teófilo
- Juan el enterrador (1981)
- Zorro, The Gay Blade (1981) – Don Fernando
- La Chèvre (1981) – Fernando (uncredited)
- Missing (1982) – Espinoza
- The Honorary Consul (1983) – Señor Escobar
- El vengador del 30-06 (1983) – El chueco Robespierre
- Encuentro con la muerte (1984)
- La hija del general (1984)
- Lázaro Cárdenas (1985)
- Pleasures (1986, TV Movie) – Ritherman
- Miracles (1986) – The Judge
- El río de oro (1986) – Armando
- Oceans of Fire (1986, TV Movie) – Cox
- Motín en la cárcel (1986)
- The Rebellion of the Hanged (1986)
- Cazador de demonios (1987) – Rastreador
- Los plomeros y las ficheras (1988)
- Domingo corrales (1988)
- El solitario indomable (1988) – Don Carlos
- Los camaroneros (1988)
- Vieja moralidad (1988) – Abuelo
- Licence to Kill (1989) – Pit Boss
- Rosa de dos aromas (1989)
- El jinete de la divina providencia (1989)
- ¿Cómo fui a enamorarme de ti? (1990) – Capo
- La zona del silencio (1990)
- Funerales del terror (1990) – Comandante
- Escuadrón salvaje (1990, Video) – Comandante
- Nacidos para morir (1991)
- Bandidos (1991) – Fat Man
- Pure Luck (1991) – Inspector Segura
- Pecado original (1991)
- Highway Patrolman (1991) – Sr. Mateos
- Retén (1991, Video)
- Gertrudis (1992) – Sr. Bocanegra
- La tumba del Atlántico (1992) – Anthony Arndold
- Policía de homicidios (1992, Video) – Comandante de Soto
- Ramiro Sierra (1992)
- Asesinos de la frontera (1992, Video)
- Reto a la ley (1992)
- Odio, amor y muerte (1993)
- En medio de la nada (1993)
- La última batalla (1993) – El Viejo
- Halcones de la muerte – Espias mortales (1993) – Romo
- Contrabando de esmeraldas (1993)
- Memoria del cine mexicano (1993) – Himself
- Una maestra con ángel (1994)
- Ámbar (1994) – Corbett
- La Chilindrina en apuros (1994) – Padre Casimiro
- El alimento del miedo (1994)
- Muerte a la mafia (1994, Video)
- El chacal del puerto (1996, Video)
- Pensamientos (1996) – Comandante

=== Television ===
Year	Title	Role	Notes
1958	Captain David Grief	Juan	Episode: "Buried Treasure"
1964	México 1900		3 episodes
1968	I Spy	Raul	Episode: "The Name of the Game"
1968–1969	The High Chaparral	El Coyote / Molinero	2 episodes
1972	Appointment with Destiny	Diego de Ordaz	Episode: "Cortez and Montezuma: The Conquest of an Empire"
1977	El mexicano		Miniseries; 3 episodes
1986	La gloria y el infierno	Fernando Vallarta	120 episodes
1987	El rincón de los prodigios		
1990	Días sin luna	Francisco	80 episodes
1990–1991	La fuerza del amor	Gustavo	155 episodes
1993–1994	Más allá del puente	Don Fulgencio Rojas	
1995	Mujer, Casos de la Vida Real		Episode: "Una lección de amor"
1996	Cañaveral de Pasiones	Samuel Aldapa	3 episodes
1997	Pueblo chico, infierno grande	Don Rosendo Equigia	Episode: "#1.1"
1997–1998	Huracán	Don Néstor Villarreal	3 episodes

=== Shorts ===
Year	Title
1989	Cuento de Navidad
1992	Mina

== Awards and accolades ==
- Virginia Fábregas Medal (1990)
- Durango Walk of Fame

=== Premios Ariel ===
Year	Category	Movie	Result
1976	Best Actor	De todos modos Juan te llamas	Won
1989	Best Supporting Actor	Los camaroneros	Won
1994	Best Actor	La última batalla	Nominated

=== Premios TVyNovelas ===
Year	Category	Telenovela	Result
1991	Best Leading Actor	Días sin luna	Won
1997	Best Leading Actor	Cañaveral de Pasiones	Won
1998	Best Leading Actor	Huracán	Won

=== Diosas de Plata ===
Year	Category	Movie	Result
1973	Best Actor	Todo por nada	Won
