= Balada por un amor =

Mexican television series

- Daniela Romo & Alfredo Adame
- Genre: Telenovela
- Created by: María Zarattini
- Written by: María Zarattini
- Directed by: José Rendón; Javier Díaz Dueñas; Karina Duprez
- Starring: Daniela Romo; Alfredo Adame; Jorge Rivero; Enrique Lizalde; Leticia Perdigón; Isaura Espinoza; Claudio Brook
- Theme music composer: Juan Lopez; Bebu Silvetti
- Opening theme: Balada por un amor by Daniela Romo; Quiero amanecer con alguien by Daniela Romo
- Country of origin: Mexico
- Original language: Spanish
- No. of episodes: 140

Production
- Executive producer: José Rendón
- Cinematography: Jorge Miguel Valdés
- Running time: 21–22 minutes
- Production company: Televisa

Original release
- Network: Canal de las Estrellas
- Release: October 30, 1989 – May 18, 1990

Related
- Lo blanco y lo negro; Destino

Balada por un amor (English title: Ballad for a love) is a Mexican telenovela produced by José Rendón for Televisa in 1989.

Daniela Romo, Alfredo Adame and Jorge Rivero starred as protagonists, while Isaura Espinoza and Leticia Perdigón starred as antagonists. Enrique Lizalde starred as special performance.

== Plot ==
The story is about the singer Brianda (Daniela Romo), the girlfriend of Gustavo (Alfredo Adame). On a trip Brianda's plane suffers an accident and falls into the sea. She runs to a forest where she meets Manuel Santa María (Jorge Rivero) who flees from thugs. Brianda and Manuel fall in love until he discovers that he is her father. Brianda is slowly discovering that who she really loves is Gustavo.

== Cast ==
- Daniela Romo as Brianda Portugal Mercader
- Alfredo Adame as Gustavo Elenes Salamanca
- Jorge Rivero as Manuel Santamaría
- Enrique Lizalde as Fernando Portugal
- Leticia Perdigón as Lucía Allende
- Isaura Espinoza as Lidia Mercader
- Claudio Brook as Marcelo Allende
- Daniela Castro as Simona Portugal
- Meche Barba as Adela
- Javier Díaz Dueñas as Sebastián
- Margarita Gralia as Virginia
- Magda Guzmán as Beatriz
- Nelly Horsman as Pachita
- Arsenio Campos as Eloy Allende
- Irma Lozano as Leonora Mercader
- Miguel Macía as Benjamín Allende
- Yolanda Mérida as Ángela Pérez
- María Teresa Rivas as Victoria
- Rafael Banquells Jr. as Agustín
- Héctor Cruz Lara as Bruno Sagasta
- Alicia Fahr as Eloísa Negrete
- Jorge Pais as Octavio Elenes
- Darío T. Pie as Pablo Negrete
- José Gálvez as Tony Vargas

== Awards ==
Year	Award	Category	Nominee	Result
1991	9th TVyNovelas Awards	Best Actress	Daniela Romo	Nominated
