= Destino (1990 TV series) =

1990 Mexican television series

- Genre: Telenovela
- Created by: Fernanda Villeli; Marissa Garrido
- Written by: María Zarattini; Vittoria Zarattini
- Directed by: Juan Carlos Muñoz; Gustavo Hernández
- Starring: Lourdes Munguía; Juan Ferrara; Fernando Balzaretti; Mariagna Prats; Saby Kamalich; Marco Muñoz; Ana Colchero
- Opening theme: Destino by Lourdes Munguía
- Ending theme: Destino by Bebu Silvetti
- Country of origin: Mexico
- Original language: Spanish
- No. of episodes: 137

Production
- Executive producer: Carlos Sotomayor
- Cinematography: Carlos Guerra Villareal
- Running time: 21-22 minutes
- Production company: Televisa

Original release
- Network: Canal de las Estrellas
- Release: May 21 – November 30, 1990

Related
- Balada por un amor; En carne propia; Mundos opuestos (1976) Destino (1982)

Destino (English title: Destiny) is a Mexican telenovela produced by Carlos Sotomayor for Televisa in 1990. Was divided in two parts. Is a remake of 1976 telenovela Mundos opuestos.

Lourdes Munguía and Juan Ferrara starred as protagonists, while Fernando Balzaretti and leading actress Saby Kamalich starred as antagonists in first part of telenovela. Mariagna Prats starred as antagonist in second part.

== Plot ==
Cecilia is a nice and shy girl. One night after returning from work, Cecilia sees when a man jumps off a building and falls dead at her feet. The body belongs to the son of billionaire Claudio de la Mora. So Claudio meets and befriends her.

Claudio ignores his fake friend René who is behind the drug addiction that drove his son to suicide. René hates Claudio and wants to destroy his entire family including whimsical Mónica, the youngest of the de la Mora family. Cecilia does not have time for such machinations, because one night she is attacked and sexually assaulted by Esteban Camacho, her neighbor that is obsessed with her.

When Cecilia becomes pregnant as a result of the attack, Claudio offers support and his surname for the child she is expecting through marriage. Cecilia is then married to Claudio and enters into an intriguing world beyond her imaginations with many who want her out of the way.

== Cast ==
- Lourdes Munguía as Cecilia Jiménez
- Juan Ferrara as Claudio de la Mora
- Fernando Balzaretti as René Kamini
- Mariagna Prats as Cristina Agudelo Palafox
- Saby Kamalich as Ana Rafaela Villaseñor
- Marco Muñoz as Luis Jiménez
- Ana Colchero as Mónica de la Mora
- Fernando Ciangherotti as Sebastián Labastida
- Tomás Goros as José Alberto Alberti
- Beatriz Aguirre as Antonia "Toña"
- Tony Carbajal as Dr. Montoya
- Luis Cárdenas as Tte. Antonio Fernández
- Ivette Proal as Beatriz "Beba" Santander
- Pilar Escalante as Rosalinda "Rosy"
- Aurora Molina as Cata
- Martín Barraza as Esteban Camacho
- Lili Blanco as Cecilia "Ceci" Fridman
- Gerardo Vigil as Alejandro
- Miguel Priego as Damián Villena
- Sergio Jurado as Lorenzo
- Jacqueline Munguía as Pamela
- Luis de Icaza as El Gordo
- Adriana Chapela as Magos
- María Teresa Guizar as Lucila
- Claudia Vega as Betty
- Tara Parra as Beatriz
- Erick Sánchez as José Pablo de la Mora Jiménez
- Karen Beatriz as Anita Jiménez de la Mora
- Rafael Sante as Pedro
- Lilian Notni as Paulina
- Juan Manuel Vilchis Sosa as Álvaro de la Mora
- Rafael Santa Desire
- Julio Ahuet as Alatorre
- Malena Castillo as Carmen
- Desirée Cantú as Fernanda
- Maya Mishalska as Odette Villatoro
- Fernando Camacho

== Awards ==
Year	Award	Category	Nominee	Result
1991	9th TVyNovelas Awards	Best Actor	Juan Ferrara	Nominated
1991	9th TVyNovelas Awards	Best Antagonist Actress	Mariagna Prats	Nominated
1991	9th TVyNovelas Awards	Best Antagonist Actor	Fernando Balzaretti	Nominated
1991	9th TVyNovelas Awards	Best Co-lead Actor	Marco Muñoz	Nominated
1991	9th TVyNovelas Awards	Best Young Lead Actress	Ana Colchero	Nominated
1991	9th TVyNovelas Awards	Best Male Revelation	Tomás Goros	Nominated
1991	9th TVyNovelas Awards	Best Child Performance	Karen Beatriz	Nominated
1991	9th TVyNovelas Awards	Best Child Performance	Erick Sánchez	Nominated
1991	9th TVyNovelas Awards	Best Original Story or Adaptation	María Zarattini	Won
