= Un rostro en mi pasado =

Television series

- Genre: Telenovela
- Created by: Fernanda Villeli
- Written by: Marcia Yance; Josefina Palos y Romo
- Directed by: Alfredo Gurrola
- Starring: Sonia Infante; Joaquín Cordero; Juan Peláez; Armando Araiza; Ana Patricia Rojo; Amara Villafuerte; Alejandro Landero
- Opening theme: Olvídate by Jorge Vargas
- Country of origin: Mexico
- Original language: Spanish
- No. of episodes: 160

Production
- Executive producer: Ernesto Alonso
- Cinematography: Jesús Acuña Lee
- Running time: 21-22 minutes
- Production company: Televisa

Original release
- Network: Canal de las Estrellas
- Release: October 16, 1989 – June 1, 1990

Related
- Un rostro en el pasado (1960)

Un rostro en mi pasado (English: A face in my past) is a Mexican telenovela produced by Ernesto Alonso for Televisa in 1989. Based on the Mexican telenovela produced in 1960 Un rostro en el pasado.

Sonia Infante, Joaquín Cordero and Juan Peláez starred as protagonists, while Ana Patricia Rojo and Armando Araiza starred as antagonists.

== Cast ==
- Sonia Infante as Elisa Estrada de Zertuche
- Joaquín Cordero as Armando Zertuche
- Armando Araiza as Roberto Zertuche Estrada
- Ana Patricia Rojo as Miranda Zertuche Estrada
- Amara Villafuerte as Clara Zertuche Estrada
- Alejandro Landero as Enrique Zertuche Estrada
- Flor Trujillo as Raquel Zertuche
- Gabriela Ruffo as Karla Duboa
- Juan Peláez as Carlos Duboa
- Chantal Andere as Mariela Vidal
- Manuel Ojeda as Dr. Leonardo Sánchez
- Silvia Manríquez as Elvira Duboa
- Alejandro Ruiz as Ricardo Gil Olmedo
- Lizzeta Romo as Graciela Romero
- Gloria Jordán as Tina
- Gilberto Román as Ernesto Vidal
- Yolanda Ciani as Rosario
- Katia del Río as Rita Romero
- Rosario Gálvez as Pacita
- Humberto Elizondo as Rafael Reyes
- Rafaello as Hugo
- Norma Lazareno as Lina Mabarak
- Dolores Beristáin as Doña Irene
- Belén Balmori as Zoila Sánchez
- Marco Hernán as Alex Bretón
- Eduardo Liñán as Joaquín Herrera
- Armando Palomo as Adán Ferreira
- Adalberto Parra as Ruperto
- Stephanie Salas as Sabrina
- Sergio Sánchez as Ringo
- José María Torre as Roberto (child)
- Faviola Elenka Tapia as Miranda (child)
- Aurea Rangel as Karla (child)
- Raúl Castro as Enrique (child)
- Andrea Torre as Mariela (child)
- Frieda Klein as Clara (child)
- Mariana Navarro as Rita (child)
- Lorena Enríquez as Magda Cervantes
- María Regina as Georgina Vidal
- José Zambrano as Nicolás de la Torre
- Rodrigo de la Mora as Ramiro Lavalle
- José Miguel Checa as Fernando Lavalle
- José Antonio Ferral as Miguel
- Carmen Cortés as Aurora Candia
- Cinthia Zurita as Adriana
- Michelle Mayer as Julia Ferrer
- Rocío Yaber as Aurelia Ferrer
- Gabriel Chávez Aguirre as Ignacio Ferrer
- Alex Phillips as Damián Villalobos
- Silvia Campos as Yolanda
- Antonio Miguel as Antonio Mabarak
- Lucía Castell as Leonora Gil Olmedo
- Araceli Aguilar as Adela
- Ángeles Marín as Chabela
- Sara Monar as Diana Reyes
- Luis Miguel Valles as Nando
- Rafael Montalvo as Edmundo Suárez

== Awards ==
Year	Award	Category	Nominee	Result
1991	9th TVyNovelas Awards	Best Young Lead Actor	Armando Araiza	Nominated
