= Ana Colchero =

Mexican actress

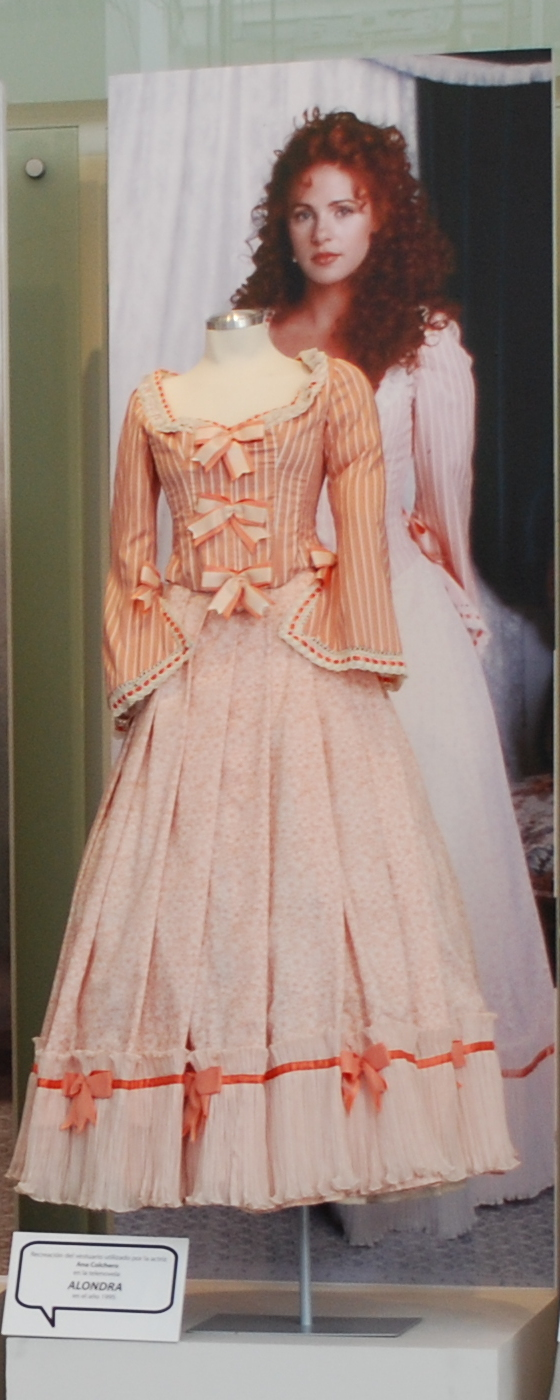
- Ana Colchero in a scene of Alondra
- Born: 9 February 1968 (age 58); Veracruz, Mexico
- Years active: 1988–2002

Ana Colchero Aragonés (born 9 February 1968) is a Mexican actress.

== Biography ==
She is the daughter of Spanish immigrants; her father is from Madrid, her mother from Barcelona.

She received a role in her first telenovela at the age of 19 with Televisa. Eight years later she obtained her first starring role as Alondra in the same titled production. This telenovela was highly rated.

She had a starring role in the first telenovela of TV Azteca.

== Films ==
Year	Title	Character	Note
2002	Acosada (previously known as De Piel de Víbora)	Eugenia	Film
2002	El columpio del diablo		Film
1994	Las delicias del matrimonio		Film
1990	No hay quinto malo		Film
1989	Rosa de dos aromas		Film

== Telenovelas ==
=== Peru ===
Year	Title	Character	Note
1999	Isabella, Mujer enamorada	Isabella Linares / Madame Claire Riveau de Alvear	Protagonist /Antagonist

=== TV Azteca ===
Year	Title	Character	Note
1996	Nada personal	Camila de los Reyes#1	Protagonist

=== Televisa ===
Year	Title	Character	Note
1995	Alondra	Alondra Díaz Real	Protagonist
1993	Corazón salvaje	Aimeé de Altamira	Main Antagonist
1991	Valeria y Maximiliano	Susana Landero	Main Antagonist
1991	Yo no creo en los hombres	Maleni Ibáñez	Antagonist
1989	Destino	Mónica de la Mora	Co-protagonist

== Theatre ==
- La maestra milagrosa
- Don Juan Tenorio
- Los derechos de la Mujer
- Mujeres sin miedo:Todas somos Atenco
