= Karen Sentíes =

Mexican telenovela actress

Karen Sentíes (born Karen Mireya Sentíes Ludwik on December 10, 1965, in Mexico City, Distrito Federal, Mexico) is a Mexican telenovela actress who is known for playing in Spanish language telenovelas on Televisa and TV Azteca and in one Canadian television series on the CBC.

== Telenovelas ==
- Eva la Trailera (Telemundo) - Carmen Soler
- En Otra Piel (Telemundo) - Lorena Serrano
- Los Rey (Azteca) - Andrea Loperena de Rey
- Una Maid en Manhattan (Telemundo) - Amelia Parker Salas
- Aurora (Telemundo) - Inés Ponce de Leon
- Pobre Diabla (TV Azteca) - Chimirra
- Amor Comprado (Venevision) - Leonora
- Olvidarte Jamás (Venevision) - Gladys Montero
- Un Nuevo Amor (TV Azteca) - Valentina Méndez (lead)
- Tres veces Sofia (TV Azteca)
- Rivales por accidente (TV Azteca)
- Magica Juventud
- Simplemente María (Televisa) - Silvia Rebollar
