= Omar Fierro =

Mexican television actor and host

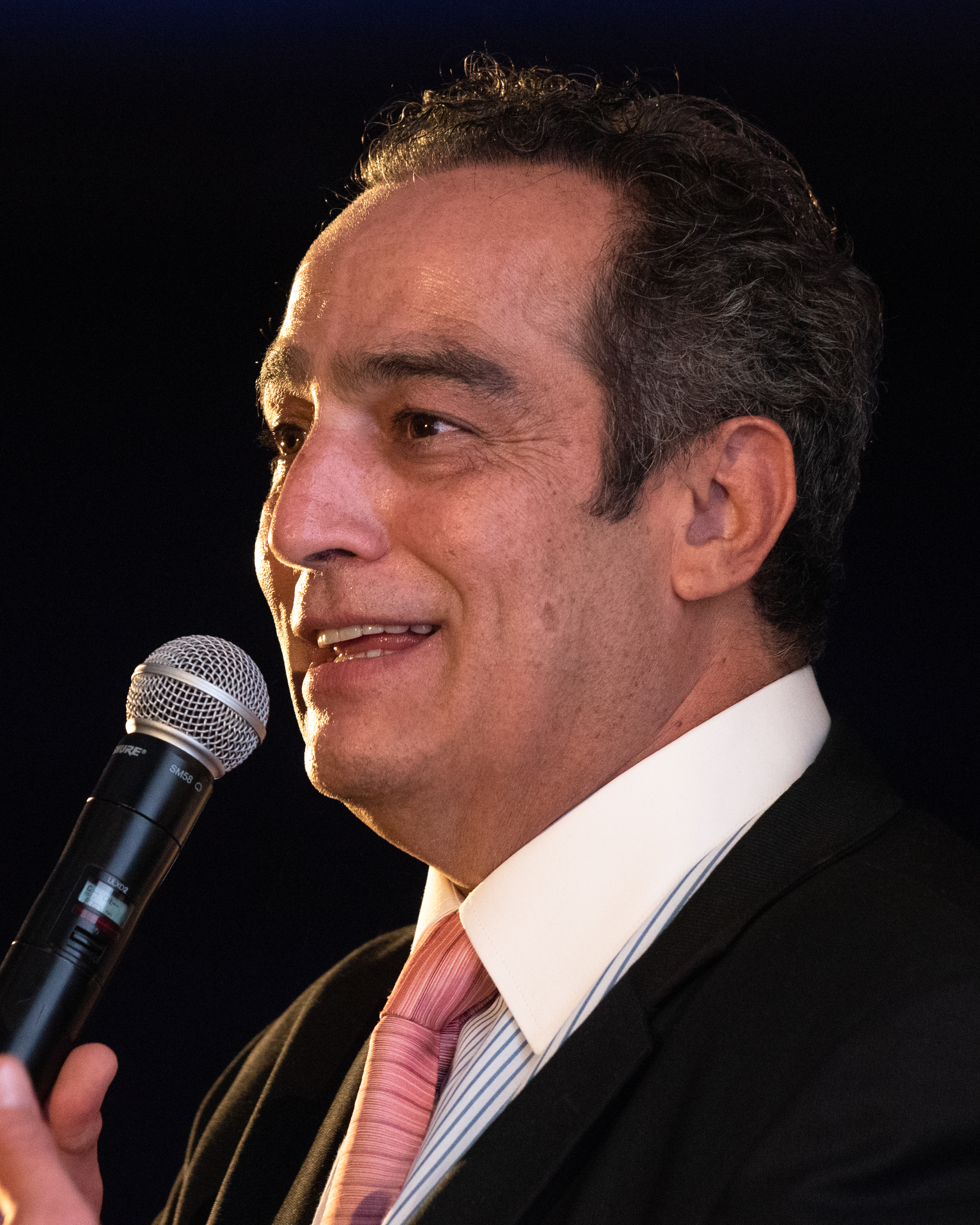
- Omar Fierro in 2022
- Born: October 10, 1963 (age 62); Mexico City, Mexico
- Occupations: Actor, Television producer

Omar Fierro (born October 10, 1963) is a Mexican television actor and host who has appeared in many soap operas in and outside Mexico, movies and television shows such as Cada Mañana, A Ganar con Omar and the Mexican version of Jeopardy!.

He currently hosts the Mexican show Quién Tiene Estrella each Sunday.

== Actor ==
- 2025: Amanecer TV series – Father Benigno Montes
- 2024: El Conde: Amor y honor TV series – Benjamín Zambrano
- 2021: Mi fortuna es amarte TV series – Elías Haddad Nassar
- 2020: La mexicana y el güero TV series – Agustín Gastellum
- 2020: Te doy la vida TV series – Horacio Villaseñor
- 2018: Señora Acero 5 TV series – Christian Almeida
- 2018: Hijas de la luna TV series – Juan Oropeza
- 2012: La Mujer de Judas TV series – Bruno
- 2011: Emperatriz TV series – Armando Mendoza
- 2010: La Loba – Ignacio (unknown episodes)
- 2009: Bajo Amenaza: 42 km. de angustia – Alberto
- 2009: Vuélveme A Querer – Samuel Montesinos
- 2008: Vivir por ti TV series – Roberto
- 2005: La ley del silencio TV series – Francisco
- 2001: Lo que callamos las mujeres – Guillermo (1 episode, 2001)
- 2000: La calle de las novias TV series – Manuel Ortega
- 1999: Buenas noches TV series – Host
- 1999: Julius TV series – Santiago
- 1998: Tres veces Sofía TV series – Federico Vidaurri
- 1998: Tentaciones TV series – Martín Farías
- 1998: "Jeopardy!" A Mexican version of U.S. NBC Jeopardy! game show (from 1998 to 2000)
- 1997: Prisioneros del amor TV series – Pietro Caligari
- 1996: La sombra del deseo TV series – Alejandro
- 1995: A oscuras me da risa
- 1995: Si Dios me quita la vida – Alfredo Román (1 episode, 1995)
- 1994: A ritmo de salsa
- 1994: Más allá del puente TV series
- 1993: Yo, tú, el, y el otro
- 1993: Reto a la ley
- 1993: Hades, vida despues de la muerte (V)
- 1993: Sueño de amor TV series – Antonio
- 1993: S.I.D.A., síndrome de muerte (V) – Edgar
- 1992: Noches de ronda – Ramon Esparza
- 1992: Soy libre
- 1992: Perros de presa
- 1992: El tigre de la frontera
- 1992: Anatomia de una violación – Teniente
- 1992: Revancha implacable (V)
- 1992: Lo blanco y lo negro TV series – Armando de Castro (unknown episodes)
- 1991: Verano peligroso – Luis Pinoncito
- 1991: Descendiente de asesinos – Alberto Fonseca
- 1991: Donde quedo el colorado
- 1990: Dios se lo pague
- 1990: Cuando llega el amor TV series – Luis Felipe
- 1990: Mi pequeña Soledad TV series – Carlos
- 1990: Lo inesperado
- 1990: Furia asesina
- 1988: Amor en silencio – Ángel (1 episode, 1988)
- 1988: Monte Calvario TV series – Román
- 1987: Quinceañera – Arturo (2 episodes, 1987)
- 1987: Lamberto Quintero – Jorge Balderrama
- 1986: Lavadores de dinero
- 1985: Vivir un poco TV series
- 1984: Principessa TV series – Casimiro
- 1984: ¡¡Cachún cachún ra-ra!! (Una loca, loca, preparatoria)
- 1983: La pobre Señorita Limantour TV series (unknown episodes)
- 1981: ¡¡Cachún cachún ra ra!! TV series – Titán
