= 21st TVyNovelas Awards =

2003 Mexican TV awards

- Date: May 31, 2003
- Location: Mexico D.F.
- Hosted by: Marco Antonio Regil & Rebecca de Alba

Highlights
- Most awards: La otra (5)
- Most nominations: Niña amada mía (10)
- Website: http://www.esmas.com/espectaculos/farandula/295201.html

Television/radio coverage
- Network: Canal de las Estrellas

The 21st TVyNovelas Awards were an academy of special awards to the best soap operas and TV shows. The awards ceremony took place on May 31, 2003 in Mexico D.F. The ceremony was televised in Mexico by Canal de las Estrellas and in the United States by Univision.

Marco Antonio Regil and Rebecca de Alba hosted the show. La otra won 5 awards, the most for the evening, including Best Telenovela. Other winners Clase 406, Las vías del amor and Niña amada mía won 2 awards each and De pocas, pocas pulgas won 1 award.

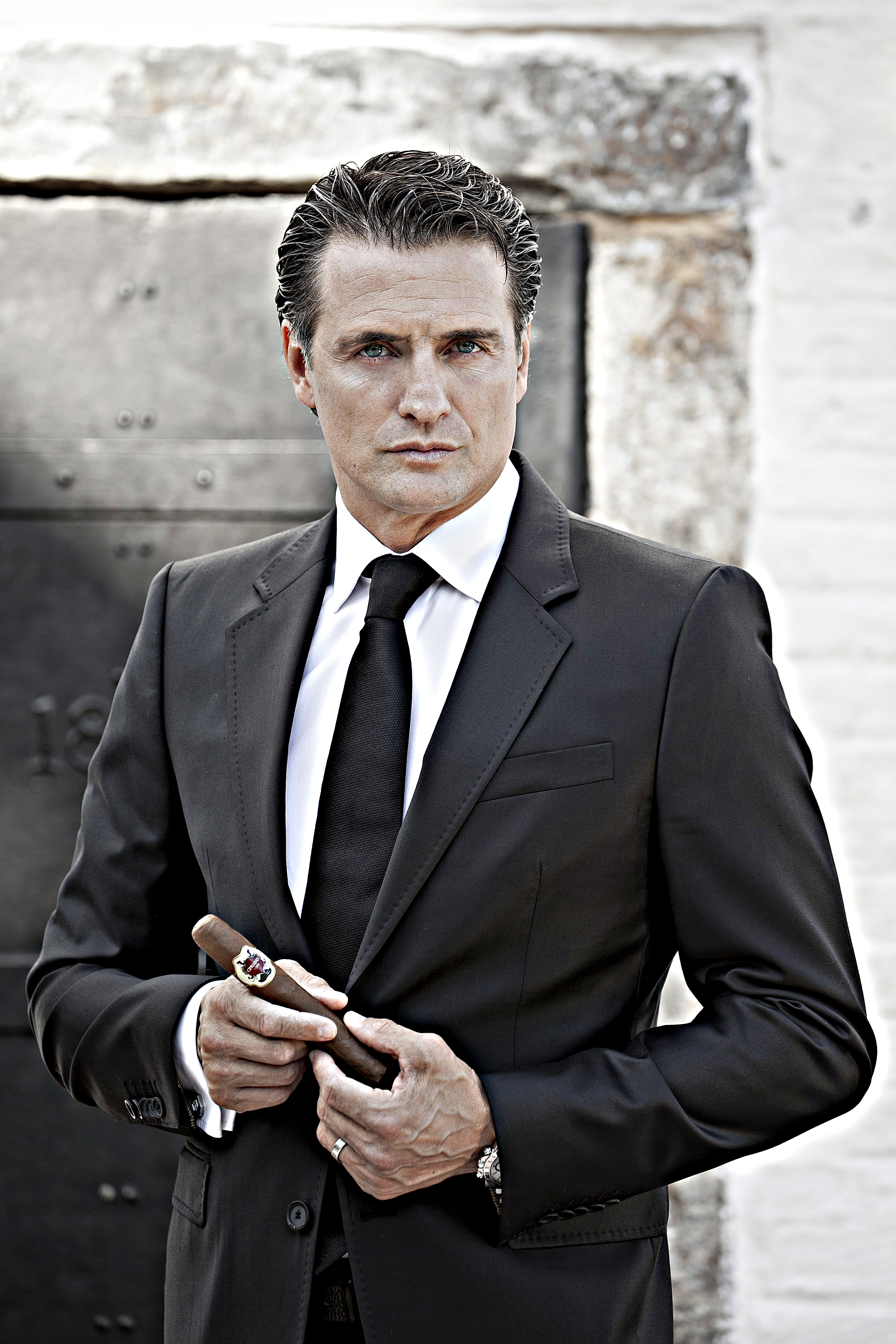
Juan Soler, winner for Best Actor.

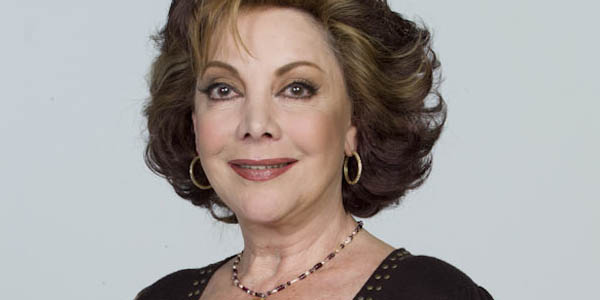
Jacqueline Andere, winner for Best Leading Actress.

== Summary of awards and nominations ==
Telenovela	Nominations	Awards
Niña amada mía	10	2
La otra	9	5
Las vías del amor	9	2
Clase 406	3	2
De pocas, pocas pulgas	3	1

== Winners and nominees ==
=== Telenovelas ===
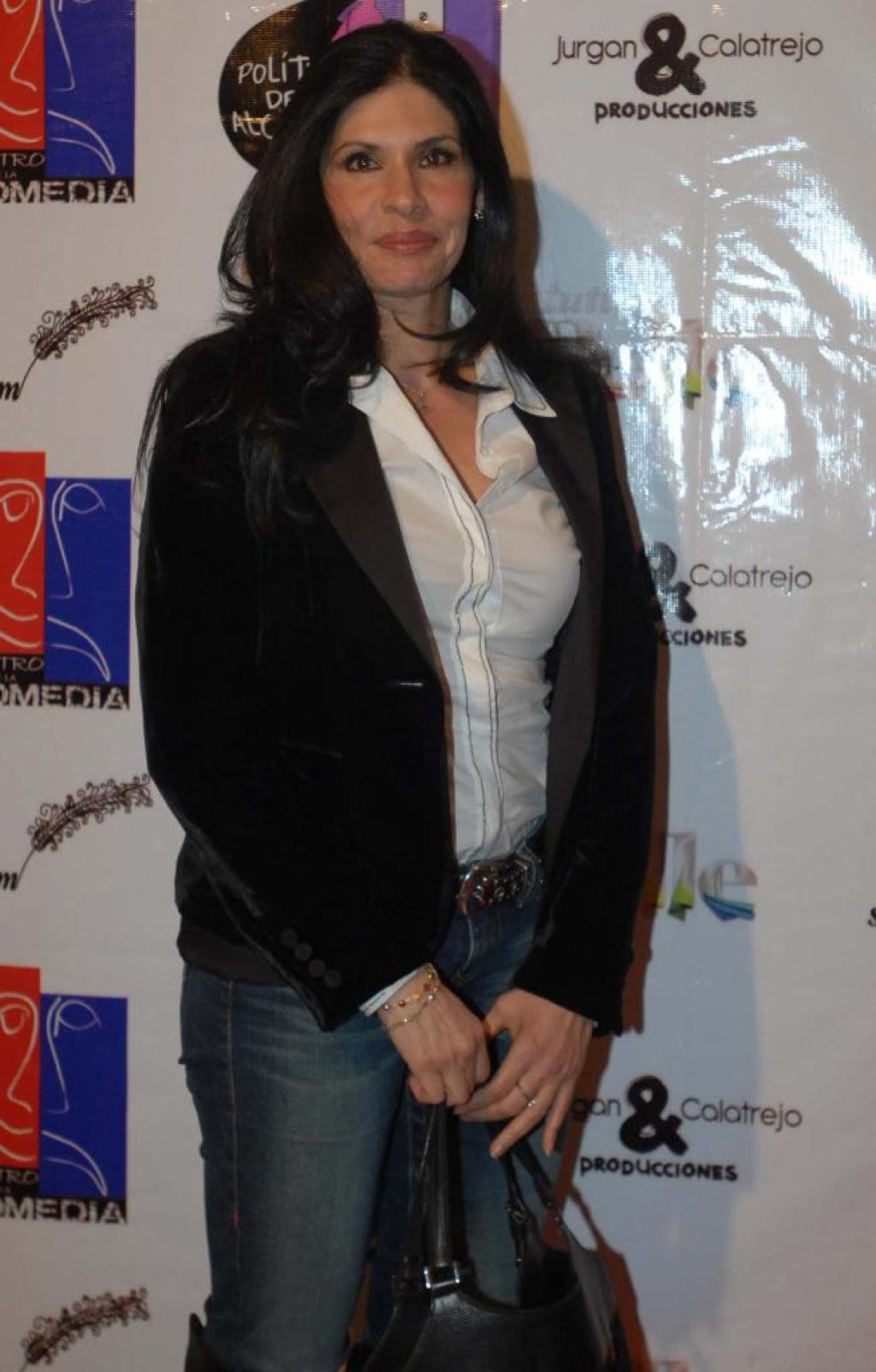
Raquel Garza, winner for Revelation in Comedy.

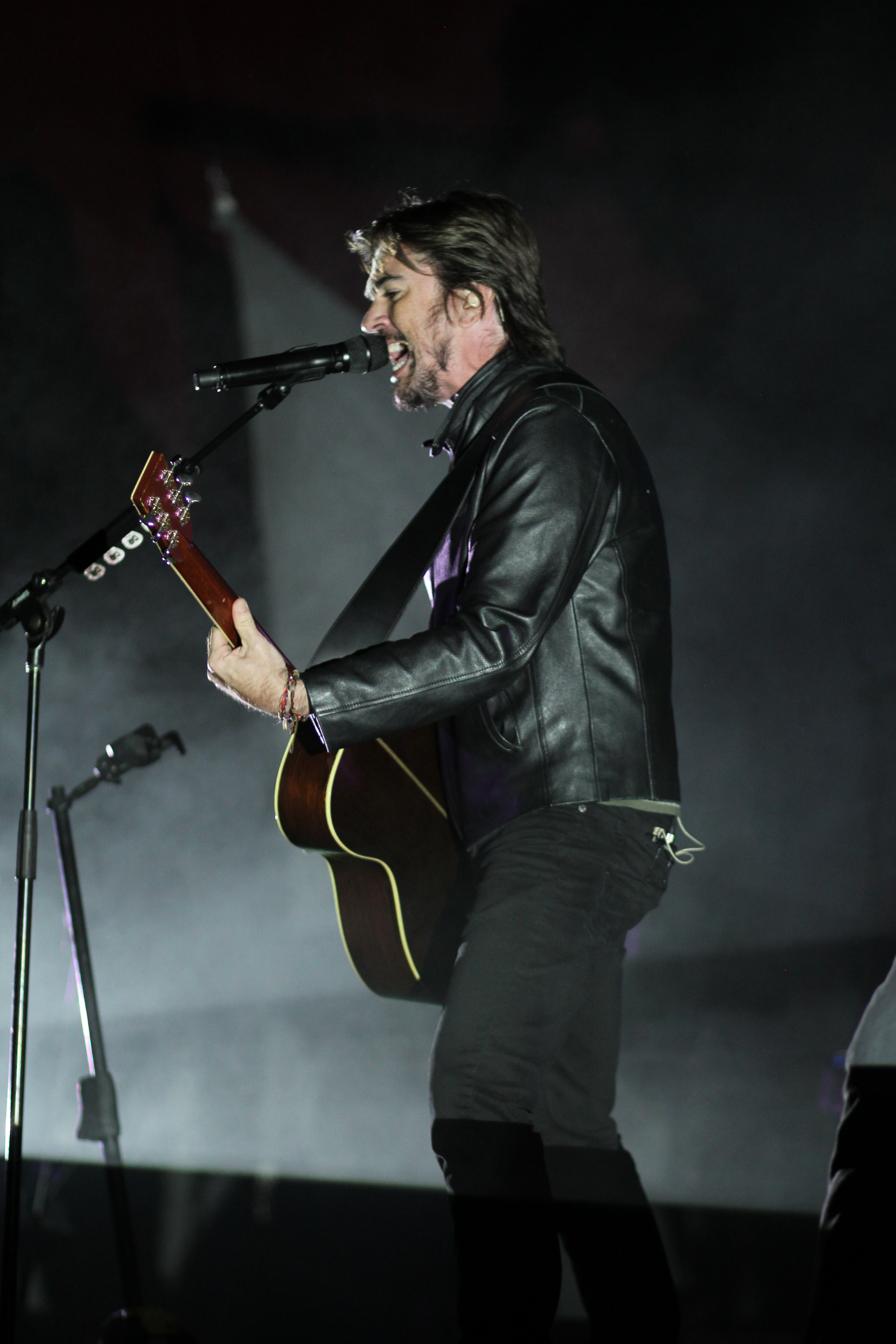
Juanes, winner for Best Singer of the Year.

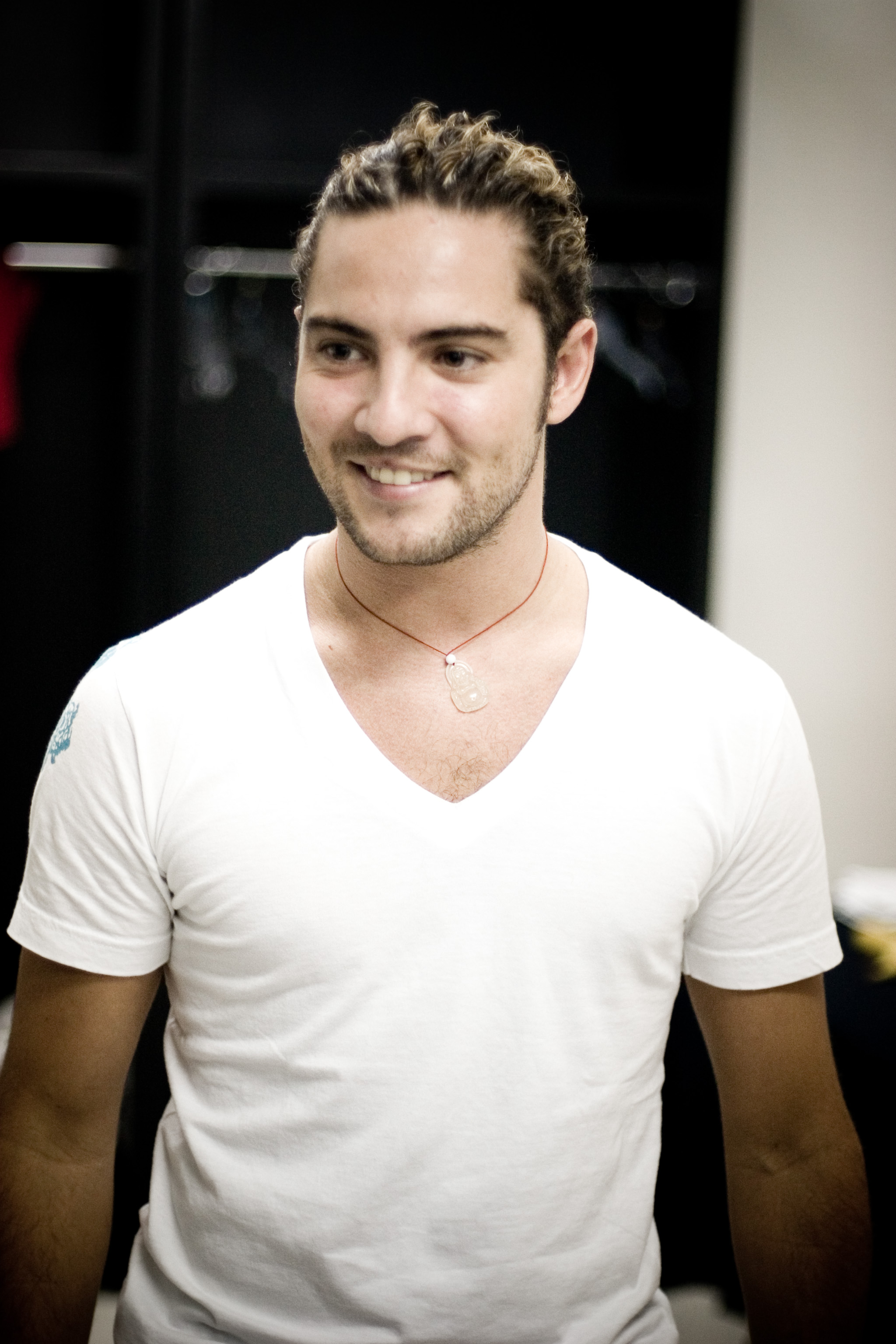
David Bisbal, awarded with a Special Award for Best International Debut as a Singer.

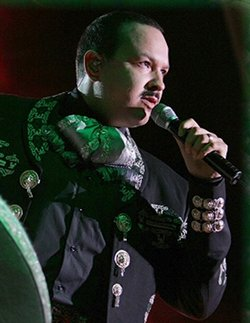
Pepe Aguilar, awarded with a Special Award for Musical Debut of 2003 in Mexican Regional Music.

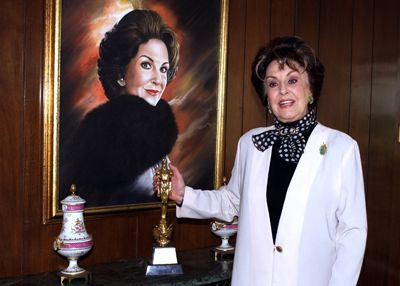
Marga López, awarded with a Special Lifetime Achievement Award as an Actress.

Best Telenovela	Best Direction
La otra; Las vías del amor; Niña amada mía	Benjamín Cann – La otra
Best Actress	Best Actor
Yadhira Carrillo – La otra; Aracely Arambula – Las vías del amor; Karyme Lozano – Niña amada mía	Juan Soler – La otra; Jorge Salinas – Las vías del amor; Sergio Goyri – Niña amada mía
Best Antagonist Actress	Best Antagonist Actor
Sasha Montenegro – Las vías del amor; Jacqueline Andere – La otra; Mercedes Molto – Niña amada mía	Enrique Rocha – Las vías del amor; Juan Pablo Gamboa – Niña amada mía; Sergio Sendel – La otra
Best Leading Actress	Best Leading Actor
Jacqueline Andere – La otra; Daniela Romo – Las vías del amor; María Victoria – De pocas, pocas pulgas	Ignacio López Tarso – De pocas, pocas pulgas; Eric del Castillo – Niña amada mía; José Carlos Ruiz – Las vías del amor
Best Supporting Actress	Best Supporting Actor
Eugenia Cauduro – Niña amada mía; Azela Robinson – La otra; Nuria Bages – Las vías del amor	Rafael Inclán – Clase 406; Otto Sirgo – Niña amada mía; Sergio Corona – De pocas, pocas pulgas
Best Female Revelation	Best Male Revelation
Mayrin Villanueva – Niña amada mía; Manuela Ímaz – Las vías del amor; Sherlyn – Clase 406	Christian Chávez – Clase 406; Jan – Niña amada mía; Julio Bracho – La otra

=== Others ===
Best Comedy Program	Best Variety Program
La parodia	Otro rollo
Best Comedy Actress	Best Comedy Actor
Angélica Vale – La parodia	Arath de la Torre – La parodia
Revelation in Comedy	Best Comedy Couple
Raquel Garza – La oreja	Miguel Galván and Adrián Uribe – La parodia
Best Singer of the Year	Special Award for Regina: The Musical
Juanes	Lucero

=== Special awards ===
- Special Accolade for Altruism: Xavier López "Chabelo"
- Best International Debut as a Singer: David Bisbal
- 50 Years as an Actress: Carmen Salinas
- Career as a Singer: Emmanuel
- Musical Career: "El consorcio"
- Musical Debut of 2003 in Mexican Regional Music: Pepe Aguilar
- 20 years of Musical Career: The different generations of the band Magneto
- Best Family Show Magazine 2002: Programa VidaTV
- Special Award: Eduardo Salazar (on the battlefront)
- Joaquín López Dóriga (war correspondent)
- Jorge Berry (Information operation from Mexico)
- Screening of Children's Telenovelas: Rosy Ocampo
- Pioneer in Telenovelas: Irma Lozano
- Lifetime Achievement Award as an Actress: Marga López
- Career as a Writer and Pioneer in Mexican Telenovelas: Fernanda Villeli
- Children's Animation: Daniela Aedo
