= TVyNovelas Award for Best Co-star Actress =

- Awarded for: Best performance by an actress in a Co-leading role
- First award: 1991; Mariana Levy; Yo compro esa mujer
- Currently held by: 2015; Fabiola Guajardo; Yo no creo en los hombres

== Winners ==
Year	Actress	Telenovela
1983,1984,1985,1986,1987,1988,1989,1990,1994	The category of this award there was as yet	
1991	Mariana Levy	Yo compro esa mujer
1992	Laura León	Muchachitas
1993	Carmen Salinas	María Mercedes
1995	Patricia Reyes Spíndola	El vuelo del águila
1996	Verónica Merchant	Alondra
1997	Alma Delfina	Cañaveral de pasiones
1998	Carmen Salinas	Mi pequeña traviesa
1999	Carmen Salinas	Preciosa
2000	Martha Roth	Mujeres engañadas
2001	Arleth Terán	Primer amor, a mil por hora
2002	Patricia Navidad	El Manantial
2002	Niurka Marcos	Salome
2003	Eugenia Cauduro	Niña amada mía
2004	Ana Bertha Espín	Amor Real
2005	Ana Martín	Rubí
2006	Mariana Karr	Alborada
2007	Elizabeth Álvarez	La fea más bella
2008	Marisol del Olmo	Pasión
2009	Patricia Reyes Spíndola	Fuego en la sangre
2010	Violeta Isfel	Atrévete a soñar
2011	Alejandra Barros	Para volver a amar
2012	Marisol del Olmo	Esperanza del Corazón
2013	Patricia Navidad	Por ella soy Eva
2014	Cynthia Klitbo	De que te quiero, te quiero
2015	Fabiola Guajardo	Yo no creo en los hombres

== Records ==
- Most awarded actress: Carmen Salinas with 3 awards
- Most nominated actress: Carmen Salinas with 3 nominations
- Actress who has won 2 consecutive years: Carmen Salinas in 1998 &amp;amp; 1999
- Younger actress who has won: Arleth Teran 24 years for the telenovela Primer amor... a mil por hora in 2001
- Oldest actress who has won: Raquel Olmedo 75 years for the telenovela Abismo de pasion in 2013
