= TVyNovelas Award for Best Supporting Actress =

Mexican television award

- Awarded for: Best performance by an actress in a supporting role
- First award: 1993; Carmen Salinas; María Mercedes
- Currently held by: 2018; Julia Urbini; Caer en tentación

== Winners and nominees ==
=== 1990s ===
Winner	Nominated
11th TVyNovelas Awards
Carmen Salinas for María Mercedes	Gabriela Goldsmith for María Mercedes; Julieta Egurrola for Triángulo
~~1994~~
13th TVyNovelas Awards
Patricia Reyes Spíndola for El vuelo del águila	Frances Ondiviela for Marimar; Julia Marichal for Marimar
14th TVyNovelas Awards
Verónica Merchant for Alondra	Carmen Salinas for María la del Barrio; Maty Huitrón for Lazos de Amor; Norma Herrera for La Dueña
15th TVyNovelas Awards
Alma Delfina for Cañaveral de pasiones	Andrea Legarreta for La sombra del otro; Angélica María for La antorcha encendida
16th TVyNovelas Awards
Nora Salinas for Esmeralda	Alma Delfina for Pueblo chico, infierno grande; Raquel Morell for Esmeralda
17th TVyNovelas Awards
Carmen Salinas for Preciosa	Cecilia Gabriela for Vivo Por Elena; Chantal Andere for La usurpadora

=== 2000s ===
Winner	Nominated
18th TVyNovelas Awards
Martha Roth for Mujeres engañadas	Maité Embil for Tres mujeres; Nora Salinas for Rosalinda
19th TVyNovelas Awards
Arleth Terán for Primer amor... a mil por hora	Carmen Salinas for Abrázame muy fuerte; Yadhira Carrillo for El precio de tu amor
20th TVyNovelas Awards
Niurka Marcos for Salomé	Carmen Salinas for Entre el Amor y el Odio; Silvia Pasquel for El Manantial
21st TVyNovelas Awards
Eugenia Cauduro for Niña amada mía	Azela Robinson for La Otra; Nuria Bages for Las Vías del Amor
22nd TVyNovelas Awards
Ana Bertha Espín for Amor Real	Adriana Fonseca for Mariana de la noche; Tiaré Scanda for Amarte es mi Pecado
23rd TVyNovelas Awards
Ana Martín for Rubí	Adamari López for Mujer de madera; Dacia González for Apuesta por un amor
24th TVyNovelas Awards
Mariana Karr for Alborada	Leticia Perdigón for Rebelde; Margarita Isabel for La Madrastra
25th TVyNovelas Awards
Elizabeth Álvarez for La fea más bella	Ingrid Martz for Heridas de amor; Karla Álvarez for Heridas de amor; Laura Flores for Mundo de fieras; Nora Salinas for La fea más bella
~~2008 and 2009~~

=== 2010s ===
Winner	Nominated
~~2010 to 2012~~
31st TVyNovelas Awards
Raquel Olmedo for Abismo de pasión	Laura Carmine for Amor bravío; Tiaré Scanda for Por ella soy Eva
32nd TVyNovelas Awards
Susana González for Amores verdaderos	Marisol del Olmo for De que te quiero, te quiero; Leticia Perdigón for Mentir para vivir
33rd TVyNovelas Awards
Cecilia Toussaint for Yo no creo en los hombres	Jessica Coch for Amor de barrio; Luz Elena González for Antes muerta que Lichita; Beatriz Moreno for La sombra del pasado; Raquel Garza for Muchacha italiana viene a casarse
34th TVyNovelas Awards
Fabiola Guajardo for Pasión y poder	Macaria for Yo no creo en los hombres; Margarita Magaña for Lo que la vida me robó; Tiaré Scanda for Qué pobres tan ricos
35th TVyNovelas Awards
Verónica Jaspeado for Vino el amor	María Sorté for Corazón que miente; Pilar Mata for La candidata; Laisha Wilkins for Tres veces Ana; Arcelia Ramírez for Un camino hacia el destino
36th TVyNovelas Awards
Julia Urbini for Caer en tentación	Vanessa Bauche for La doble vida de Estela Carrillo; Olivia Bucio for Mi marido tiene familia; Michelle González for Papá a toda madre; Cecilia Toussaint for Sin tu mirada

== Records ==
- Most awarded actress: Carmen Salinas, 2 times.
- Most nominated actress: Carmen Salinas with 5 nominations.
- Most nominated actress without a win: Tiaré Scanda with 3 nominations.
- Youngest winner: Julia Urbini, 21 years old.
- Youngest nominee: Nora Salinas, 24 years old.
- Oldest winner: Raquel Olmedo, 75 years old.
- Oldest nominee: Carmen Salinas, 69 years old.
- Actress winning after long time: Carmen Salinas by (María Mercedes, 1993) and (Preciosa, 1999), 6 years difference.
- Actresses was nominated in this category, despite having played as a main villain:
  - Alma Delfina (Pueblo chico, infierno grande, 1998)
  - Chantal Andere (La usurpadora, 1999)
  - Nora Salinas (Rosalinda, 2000)
  - Elizabeth Álvarez (La fea más bella, 2007)
  - Laura Carmine (Amor bravío, 2013)
  - Jessica Coch (Amor de barrio, 2015)
- Foreign winning actress:
  - Martha Roth from Italy
  - Niurka Marcos from Cuba
  - Mariana Karr from Argentina
  - Raquel Olmedo from Cuba
