= Sergio Sendel =

Mexican actor

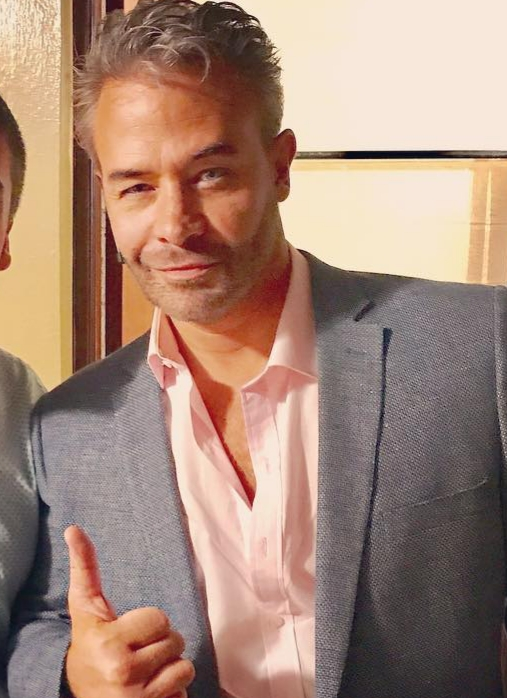
- Sendel in 2020
- Born: Arnoldo Sergio Santaella Sendel; November 4, 1966 (age 60); Mexico City, Mexico
- Occupation: Actor
- Spouse: Marcela Rodriguez (m. 1996; div. 2012)
- Children: 2

Arnoldo Sergio Santaella Sendel (born November 4, 1966) is a Mexican actor, known for playing antagonistic roles in Mexican telenovelas.

He won the TVyNovelas Award for Best Antagonist Actor in 2008 for his role as Aarón Montalvo Iturbe in Destilando Amor.

== Early life ==
Sergio Sendel was born in Mexico City, Mexico, on November 4, 1966. He is the son of Elsa Sendel.

== Career ==
=== 1990s ===
Sendel made his television debut in 1990, appearing in telenovelas, including Mi pequeña Soledad in 1990 as Gustavo and Alcanzar una estrella II in 1991.

In 1992, he had a supporting role in Muchachitas as Pedro.

Later in 1993, he got his second supporting role in Dos mujeres, un camino. Also in 1993, he participated in the film Zapatos viejos, with Gloria Trevi.

His first role as an antagonist was in the 1999 telenovela Tres mujeres.

=== 2000s ===
Sendel continued to portray antagonistic roles in other telenovelas, including Ramona, La intrusa and La Otra.

Sendel provided his voice to Diego in the Latin American Spanish dub of the 2002 film Ice Age. Although he was originally contracted to voice for the character again in the film's 2006 sequel, he left the project when the producers would not meet his financial demands.

He had his first protagonist role in 2004 with Amarte es mi Pecado, alongside Yadhira Carrillo and Alessandra Rosaldo. He marked his second protagonist role in 2005 in Salvador Mejía's production La esposa virgen, alongside Jorge Salinas, Adela Noriega and Natalia Esperón.

He returned to play antagonistic roles in 2006 with the telenovela Heridas de amor as César Beltrán Campuzano.

In 2007, he was the antagonist in Destilando amor, working with Eduardo Yañez and is one of his most notable performances since he was awarded the 2008 TVyNovelas Awards for Best Antagonist Actor.

In 2008, Sendel and Lucero played the antagonists in the Nicandro Diaz production Mañana es para siempre, alongside Silvia Navarro and Fernando Colunga.

=== 2010s ===
In 2011, he returned to telenovelas in Una familia con suerte as Vicente Irabien, alongside Daniela Castro and Mayrín Villanueva.

In July 2013, he was confirmed to star in the Angelli Nesma production Lo que la vida me robó, together with an ensemble cast consisting of Daniela Castro, Angelique Boyer and Luis Roberto Guzmán. Sendel played Pedro Medina, Nadia's (Alejandra Garcia) ambitious and cruel husband.

In 2015, he was part of the main cast in Lo imperdonable, a Salvador Mejía production, working together with Ana Brenda Contreras, Iván Sánchez and Grettel Valdéz.

=== 2020s ===
In May 2020, it was announced by Telemundo that Sendel would return to acting.

=== Filmography ===
==== Films ====
Year	Title	Role
2015	Un gallo con muchos huevos	Bankivoide (voice)
2002	Ice Age	Diego (voice Spanish)

==== Television ====
Year	Title	Role	Notes
1990	Mi pequeña Soledad	Gustavo 'Tavo'	Guest star
1991	Alcanzar una estrella II	Rico	Guest star
1991	Muchachitas	Pedro Ortigoza Domínguez	Supporting role
1992	Mágica juventud	Leonardo Grimaldi Retana	Main cast
1993-94	Dos mujeres, un camino	Raymundo Soto #2	Supporting role
1999	Tres mujeres	Adrián de la Fuente	Main cast
2000	Ramona	Sheriff Jack Green	Main cast
2001	La intrusa	Danilo Roldán Limantur	Main cast
2002	La Otra	Adrián Ibáñez	Main cast
2004	Amarte es mi Pecado	Arturo Sandoval de Anda	Main role
2005	La esposa virgen	Fernando Ortiz Betancourt	Main role
2006	Heridas de amor	César Beltrán Campuzano	Main cast
2007	Destilando Amor	Aarón Montalvo Iturbe	Main cast
2008-09	Mañana es para siempre	Damián Gallardo Roa	Main cast
2011-12	Una familia con suerte	Vicente Irabien Rubalcaba	Main cast
2013-14	Lo que la vida me robó	Pedro Medina	Main cast
2015	Lo imperdonable	Emiliano Prado-Castelo Duran	Main cast
2019	El corazón nunca se equivoca	Ubaldo Ortega Fabela	Main cast
2021-22	Mi fortuna es amarte	Adrián Cantú Garza	Main cast
2023-24	Golpe de suerte	Dante Ferrer	Main cast
2024	El Conde: Amor y honor	Gerardo Villarreal	Main cast
2026	Guardián de mi vida	Gonzalo Balmori-Ricci	Main cast

=== Accolades ===
==== Premios TVyNovelas ====
Year	Category	Telenovela	Result
2003	Best Male Antagonist	La Otra	Nominated
2004	Best Male Lead Actor	Amarte es mi pecado	Nominated
2007	Best Male Antagonist	Heridas de amor	Nominated
2008	Best Male Antagonist	Destilando amor	Won
2015	Best Male Antagonist	Lo que la vida me robó	Nominated

==== Premios Bravo ====
Year	Category	Telenovela	Result
2008	Best Male Antagonist	Destilando amor	Won

==== People en Español ====
Year	Category	Telenovela	Result
2009	Best Villain	Mañana es para siempre	Nominated
2012	Best Villain	Una familia con suerte	Nominated
2014	Best Villain	Lo que la vida me robó	Won

On December 8, 2007, he received a star on the Paseo de las Luminarias alley in the Plaza de las Estrellas.

== Personal life ==
Sendel divorced from Marcela Rodriguez in 2012 after 16 years of marriage.

He has two children, twins Elsa Valeria and Sergio Graco.
