= Una familia con suerte =

Mexican telenovela

- Genre: Telenovela
- Based on: Los Roldán by Marcelo Tinelli and Sebastián Ortega
- Screenplay by: María Antonieta Gutiérrez; Marcia del Río
- Story by: Adriana Lorenzón
- Directed by: Aurelio Ávila; Salvador Sánchez; Jorge Fonseca
- Creative director: Abigail Sánchez
- Starring: Daniela Castro; Sergio Sendel; Arath de la Torre; Luz Elena González; Mayrín Villanueva; Alicia Rodríguez
- Theme music composer: Alejandra Guzmán; José Luis Ortega
- Opening theme: "Día de Suerte" by Alejandra Guzmán
- Country of origin: Mexico
- Original language: Spanish
- No. of episodes: 265

Production
- Executive producer: Juan Osorio
- Producer: Nelson Rojas
- Cinematography: Antonio García
- Editor: Felipe Ortiz
- Camera setup: Multi-camera
- Production company: Televisa

Original release
- Network: Canal de las Estrellas
- Release: February 14, 2011 – February 19, 2012

Una familia con suerte (A Fortunate Family) is a Mexican telenovela produced by Juan Osorio for Televisa in 2011. It is based on the Argentinean telenovela Los Roldán. Arath De La Torre, Mayrín Villanueva and Luz Elena González star as the main protagonists, while Sergio Sendel, Daniela Castro, Cecilia Galliano, María Rubio, Enrique Rocha and Patricia Reyes Spíndola star as the antagonists. Una familia con suerte won four awards at the 30th Premios TVyNovelas for Best Young Lead Actor, Best Male and Female Revelation, and Best Musical Theme.

== Plot ==
Una Familia Con Suerte is a soap opera about Francisco "Pancho" López (de la Torre) and his family. Pancho is a humble, low-income man with strong characteristics. He is a generous, widowed family man, always lending a hand, a public market vendor. Although he has intuitive business sense, he believes that money is the root of all evil. Pancho has four children: Pepe López (Pablo Lyle), his eldest son, a very courageous and adventurous young man. He is the apprentice to a mechanical engineer, has a passion for driving, and is able to transcend class barriers, communicating with all people with ease; Guadalupe "Lupita" (Alejandra García), his favorite daughter, who inherited her father's love and compassion for other people; Ana (Sherlyn) is musically inclined and is the tomboy of the family; Temo (Daniel Arévalo) is the baby. Laura Torres de López (Ana Bárbara), Pancho's wife, died after giving birth to Temo, who is raised by Graciela "Chela" (Luz Elena González), Pancho's sister-in-law; she becomes the mother figure after her sister's death. Chela has had a crush on Pancho before he married her sister. Candelaria "Candela" López (Alicia Machado) is Pancho's sister. She is stunning and has a large amount of followers due to her beauty. The López's also own a dog named Popeye, which they consider a part of the family.

Avon subsidiary president Fernanda Peñaloza (Alicia Rodríguez) discovers that she has cancer and decides to commit suicide. She is about to jump off of a bridge when Pancho happens upon her and attempts to dissuade her. He manages to convince her that life is worth fighting for, and she comes back to the safety of his delivery truck, "La Burra" ("The [Female] Donkey"). Fernanda is introduced to Pancho's children, and they quickly develop a grandmother-grandchildren-like bond.

Pancho and his family come up against financial difficulties: he has pledged his house as collateral for a loan that he ends up finding impossible to repay. Humiliated by his inability to provide for his family's well-being, Pancho has no option but to accept Fernanda's offer to take the post as president of her cosmetic company. Fernanda also invites the López family to move into her mansion since she highly appreciates Pancho's honesty and reliability. The López family accepts this offer reluctantly, and in their new neighborhood they meet the Irabién family, consisting of Vicente (Sergio Sendel), Fernanda's nephew, Pina (Daniela Castro), his hypochondriac wife, and their son Freddy (Juan Diego Covarrubias). Fernanda finds Pancho worthy of a better life, unlike her nephew Vicente, who merely bides his time waiting for the death of his aunt and the inheritance that would come with it; meanwhile, Pina hosts her own radio show, Pina Opina (Pina Opines) where she is able to find an outlet for her discontent, as neither her husband nor her son take care of or pay attention to her. She has a small dog named Abeja ("Bee") that she keeps with her at all times. Enzo Rinaldi (Pedro Moreno), a rich man and friend of the Irabiéns, plots to throw the López and their friends away. Pepe meets and becomes interested in Enzo's daughter, Mónica Rinaldi (Violeta Isfel). However, she is engaged to Freddy, and Pepe must compete with her fiancé in the professional and personal spheres for Mónica's love.

The dramatic change of scenery for the López family results in many humorous situations arising from the clashing of cultures between the rich and the poor. At one point, Popeye, the López family's dog, seduces Pina's pampered dog and this becomes another point of contention between the two families.

The attractive and clever Rebeca Treviño (Mayrín Villanueva) takes Pancho under her wing and helps him acclimate to the challenges of the business world. She helps him bridge socio-economic divides, teaching him the etiquette demanded from his new position and how to make decisions in the financial sphere. She becomes Chela's competitor for Pancho's attention. In turn, Vicente takes a great interest in Candela and the couple engage in a dramatic love affair and end up getting married. On the other-other hand, Enzo falls in love with Chela, and they too, get married.

The two families experience amusing situations when Ana, who disdains flippancy, falls in love with the irreverent Freddy, who shares the same feelings. Pina becomes infatuated with Sebastian, a man who saved her life. Fernanda later discovers that Pancho is actually the long-lost son she was forced to give up for adoption.

== Cast ==
=== Starring ===
- Daniela Castro as Josefina “Pina” Arteaga de Irabien / de Bravo
- Sergio Sendel as Vicente "Iracheta" Irabien Peñaloza
- Arath de la Torre as Francisco "Pancho" López Peñaloza
- Luz Elena González as Graciela “Chela” Torres de Rinaldi
- Mayrin Villanueva as Rebeca Treviño de Lopez
- Alicia Rodríguez as Fernanda Peñaloza

=== Also starring ===
- Julio Bracho as Arnoldo
- Alicia Machado as Candelaria "Candy" López de Irabien
- Sherlyn as Ana López Torrés de Irabien
- Violeta Isfel as Monica Rinaldi de Lopez
- Pedro Moreno as Enzo Rinaldi
- Jorge Van Rankin as Nico
- Claudia Godínez as Elena Campos
- Moisés Suárez as Lamberto
- Maria Riquelme as Sandra
- Lucas Velázquez as Alejandro "Alex" Obregón
- Osvaldo de León as Tomás Campos
- Francisco Vázquez as Chacho
- Elena Guerrero as Adoración
- Haydée Navarra as Gregoria
- Alejandra García as Guadalupe López Torrés de Obregon / de Campos
- Mariluz Bermúdez as Karina
- Pablo Lyle as Pepe López Torrés
- Juan Diego Covarrubias as Alfredo Irabien Arteaga
- Noemí Gutiérrez as Celeste
- Ingrid Marie Rivera as Bárbara Palacios

=== Recurring ===
- Roberto Palazuelos Mike Anderson
- Cecilia Galliano as Violeta Ruíz Carballo
- David Ostrosky as Ernesto Queso
- Patricia Reyes Spíndola as Carlota
- Jesus Moré as Adrian

=== Special guest stars ===
- Ana Bárbara as Laura Torrés de López
- Maribel Guardia as Isabella Ruiz
- Jorge Aravena as Sebastián Bravo
- Laura Flores as Yuyú Arteaga
- María Rubio as Inés de la Borbolla y Ruiz
- Silvia Pinal as Herself
- Alejandra Guzmán as Herself
- Pablo Montero as Himself
- Patricia Navidad as Mimí de la Rose

== Awards ==
=== TVyNovelas Awards 2012 ===
Category	Nominee	Result
Best Telenovela	Una familia con suerte	Nominated
Best Lead Actress	Mayrín Villanueva	Nominated
Best Lead Actor	Arath de la Torre	Nominated
Best First Actor	Enrique Rocha	Nominated
Best Co-star Actor	Pedro Moreno	Nominated
Best Co-star Actress	Alicia Machado	Nominated
Best Young Lead Actor	Osvaldo de León	Won
Best Male Revelation	Pablo Lyle	Won
Best Female Revelation	Alejandra García	Won
Best Musical Theme	Un día de suerte by Alejandra Guzmán	Won
