= Juegos de amor y poder =

- Genre: Telenovela
- Based on: Juegos de poder by Luis Ponce
- Developed by: Ximena Suárez; Julián Aguilar
- Written by: Edwin Valencia; Isabel de Sara
- Directed by: Carlos Cock Marín; Rolando Ocampo; Carlos Santos
- Starring: Arap Bethke; Claudia Martín; Mayrín Villanueva; Eduardo Santamarina; Alejandra Barros
- Composers: Sergio Jurado; Jorge Jurado
- Country of origin: Mexico
- Original language: Spanish
- No. of seasons: 1
- No. of episodes: 70

Production
- Executive producer: Carlos Bardasano
- Producer: Carmen Cecilia Urbaneja
- Editor: Alba Merchán Hamann
- Camera setup: Multi-camera
- Production company: TelevisaUnivision

Original release
- Network: Univision
- Release: 17 March – 30 June 2025

Juegos de amor y poder (English: Games of Love and Power) is a Mexican telenovela produced by Carlos Bardasano for TelevisaUnivision. It is based on the 2019 Chilean telenovela Juegos de poder, created by Luis Ponce. The series stars Claudia Martín and Arap Bethke. It aired on Univision from 17 March 2025 to 30 June 2025. In Mexico, the series aired on Las Estrellas from 31 March 2025 to 4 July 2025.

== Plot ==
Luciana Espinoza is a young psychologist who by fate will meet Roberto Roldán, a prominent lawyer working as a prosecutor specializing in homicide cases. Roberto protects Luciana from being mugged and they fall in love, but before long their relationship becomes tangled in a web of intrigue and secrets.

Enrique Ferrer is a prominent politician who aspires to become president of his country. During a night out with his cousin Memo and his girlfriend Alexandra, Adrián Ferrer, Enrique's son, runs over two brothers leaving one of them dead. Having learned of his son's crime, Enrique will move swiftly to keep it hidden and prevent his aspirations as a presidential candidate from being affected. The person appointed to investigate the crime will be Roberto, who vows to bring justice to the victim and find those responsible for the murder, but the decision will lead him to a direct confrontation with Luciana.

Luciana carries with her a painful past due to the death of her parents when she was six years old. Her godparents, Enrique and Inés, helped raise her and she grew up considering the Ferrers her family, developing a father-daughter relationship with Enrique. Torn between her love for Roberto and her loyalty to her family, Luciana will be at a crossroads to resolve.

== Cast ==
=== Main ===
- Arap Bethke as Roberto Roldán
- Claudia Martín as Luciana Espinoza
- Mayrín Villanueva as Inés Avendaño
- Eduardo Santamarina as Enrique Ferrer
- Alejandra Barros as Mariana Avendaño
- Lorena Graniewicz as Karina Cortés
- Sylvia Pasquel as Sofía Durán
- Juan Soler as Leonardo Vidal
- Alejandro Tommasi as Francisco Avendaño
- Omar Germenos as Mateo Solís
- Lambda García as Patricio Ferrer Avendaño
- Alan Slim as Germán Torres
- Juan Carlos Barreto as Quirino Hernández
- Arleth Terán as Bertha Rodríguez
- Adriana Williams as Victoria Jiménez
- Erik Díaz as Joaquín Rivas
- Gabriela Platas as Elena Leal
- Mauricio Pimentel as Omar Saldaña
- Edward Castillo as Daniel Saldaña
- Paola Toyos as Rebeca
- Roberto Mateos as Luis
- Rodolfo Arias as Manolo
- Ariana Saavedra as Alexandra Muñoz
- Carlos Said as Memo Solís
- Cinthia Aparicio as Natalia
- Paulina R. Menéndez as Susana
- Ana de Villa as Fabiola Briseño
- Vane Olaguerra as Clara
- Tristan Maze as Adrián Ferrer Avendaño
- Olivia Duflos as Gaby Roldán

=== Recurring and guest stars ===
- Sophie Gaëlle
- Agustín Arana
- Eduardo Cortejosa as Bruno López "El Greñas"
- Javo Benítez as Tobías
- Valeria Florian as Carolina
- Daniela Gálvez as Vicenta
- Romina Rebecchi
- Enrique Chi
- Bárbara Carbajal
- Alec Chaparro

== Production ==
In August 2024, it was reported that Bardasano was working on his next telenovela and unlike his previous productions for TelevisaUnivision, this would be his first without the involvement of W Studios. On 14 October 2024, Claudia Martín and Arap Bethke were confirmed in the lead roles. Filming began on 17 October 2024. On 20 January 2025, while filming on the 18th floor of a building located on Paseo de la Reforma, a fire broke out due to an electrical short circuit and several cast and crew members were hospitalized due to smoke inhalation. Filming concluded on 13 February 2025.

== Ratings ==
=== Mexico ratings ===
Viewership and ratings per season of Juegos de amor y poder
Season	Timeslot (CT)	Episodes	First aired		Last aired		Avg. viewers (millions)
Season	Timeslot (CT)	Episodes	Date	Viewers (millions)	Date	Viewers (millions)	Avg. viewers (millions)
1	Mon–Fri 9:30 p.m.	70	31 March 2025	4.32	4 July 2025	5.24	4.44

== Episodes ==
No.	Title	U.S. air date	Mexico air date	Mexico viewers (millions)
1	"Inesperado encuentro"	17 March 2025	31 March 2025	4.32
2	"Juramentos"	18 March 2025	1 April 2025	4.33
3	"La evidencia"	19 March 2025	2 April 2025	4.57
4	"Falso testimonio"	21 March 2025	3 April 2025	4.33
5	"Impactante noticia"	24 March 2025	4 April 2025	4.55
6	"Decepciones"	25 March 2025	7 April 2025	4.14
7	"Nueva amiga"	26 March 2025	8 April 2025	4.34
8	"Punto débil"	27 March 2025	9 April 2025	4.67
9	"Sorpresa impactante"	28 March 2025	10 April 2025	4.66
10	"Preguntas incómodas"	31 March 2025	11 April 2025	4.43
11	"Evidencia"	1 April 2025	14 April 2025	4.55
12	"Con evidencia en mano"	2 April 2025	15 April 2025	4.66
13	"Cabos sueltos"	3 April 2025	16 April 2025	4.62
14	"Secretos"	4 April 2025	17 April 2025	4.32
15	"Malas intenciones"	7 April 2025	18 April 2025	3.55
16	"En otra relación"	8 April 2025	21 April 2025	4.14
17	"Testigo desaparecido"	9 April 2025	22 April 2025	4.22
18	"Movimiento inesperado"	10 April 2025	23 April 2025	4.20
19	"Noviazgo descubierto"	11 April 2025	24 April 2025	4.63
20	"Certificado de divorcio"	14 April 2025	25 April 2025	3.81
21	"El primer beso"	15 April 2025	28 April 2025	4.38
22	"Nuevas parejas"	17 April 2025	29 April 2025	4.78
23	"Separación necesaria"	18 April 2025	30 April 2025	4.71
24	"Tormentoso secreto"	21 April 2025	1 May 2025	4.14
25	"Ataque en el parque"	22 April 2025	2 May 2025	3.98
26	"Terrible venganza"	23 April 2025	5 May 2025	4.87
27	"Candidato sin valores"	24 April 2025	6 May 2025	4.69
28	"Dolorosa verdad"	25 April 2025	7 May 2025	4.82
29	"Verdad al descubierto"	28 April 2025	8 May 2025	4.11
30	"Beso prohibido"	29 April 2025	9 May 2025	4.22
31	"Obsesión por el poder"	30 April 2025	12 May 2025	4.34
32	"Caso importante"	1 May 2025	13 May 2025	4.30
33	"Odio incontrolable"	2 May 2025	14 May 2025	4.04
34	"Nueva deuda"	5 May 2025	15 May 2025	4.21
35	"Ira descontrolada"	6 May 2025	16 May 2025	4.53
36	"Negación"	7 May 2025	19 May 2025	4.93
37	"Aliado equivocado"	8 May 2025	20 May 2025	4.23
38	"Culpa que lastima"	9 May 2025	21 May 2025	4.33
39	"Un antiguo amor"	12 May 2025	22 May 2025	4.25
40	"Ojo por ojo"	13 May 2025	23 May 2025	4.31
41	"Atrapado en la culpa"	14 May 2025	26 May 2025	4.49
42	"Muerte sospechosa"	15 May 2025	27 May 2025	4.37
43	"Venganzas"	16 May 2025	28 May 2025	4.20
44	"La familia perfecta"	19 May 2025	29 May 2025	4.30
45	"El poder de la información"	20 May 2025	30 May 2025	4.75
46	"Testigo importante"	21 May 2025	2 June 2025	4.36
47	"Relaciones prohibidas"	23 May 2025	3 June 2025	4.21
48	"Ojo por ojo"	26 May 2025	4 June 2025	4.56
49	"Amante compartido"	27 May 2025	5 June 2025	5.08
50	"El culpable del fraude"	28 May 2025	6 June 2025	4.74
51	"Misterioso asesinato"	29 May 2025	9 June 2025	4.65
52	"Familia peligrosa"	30 May 2025	10 June 2025	4.17
53	"Crimen sin memoria"	2 June 2025	11 June 2025	4.16
54	"Falso culpable"	3 June 2025	12 June 2025	4.32
55	"Una noticia inesperada"	4 June 2025	13 June 2025	4.78
56	"Falsas promesas"	5 June 2025	16 June 2025	4.65
57	"Acorralada"	6 June 2025	17 June 2025	4.12
58	"Crimen confesado"	9 June 2025	18 June 2025	4.12
59	"Dolorosos recuerdos"	11 June 2025	19 June 2025	4.55
60	"Crímenes descubiertos"	12 June 2025	20 June 2025	4.55
61	"Amor verdadero"	13 June 2025	23 June 2025	4.42
62	"Infarto"	16 June 2025	24 June 2025	4.63
63	"Falsas promesas"	17 June 2025	25 June 2025	4.46
64	"Fuertes traiciones"	19 June 2025	26 June 2025	4.69
65	"Dolorosas verdades"	20 June 2025	27 June 2025	4.15
66	"Hijo reconocido"	23 June 2025	30 June 2025	4.25
67	"Secretos familiares"	25 June 2025	1 July 2025	4.94
68	"La familia perfecta"	26 June 2025	2 July 2025	4.62
69	"Una carta inesperada"	27 June 2025	3 July 2025	4.72
70	"El poder del amor"	30 June 2025	4 July 2025	5.24

== Broadcast ==
In the United States, the telenovela premiered on Univision on 17 March 2025. In Mexico, the telenovela premiered on Las Estrellas on 31 March 2025.
