= La Otra =

Mexican telenovela

- Genre: Telenovela; Romance; Drama
- Created by: Liliana Abud
- Written by: Orlando Merino; Jaime García Estrada; Tere Medina
- Directed by: Benjamín Cann; Rodrigo Zaunbos
- Starring: Juan Soler; Yadhira Carrillo; Jacqueline Andere; Sergio Sendel
- Theme music composer: Denisse de Kalafe
- Opening theme: "La otra" performed by Benny Ibarra and Edith Márquez
- Country of origin: Mexico
- Original language: Spanish
- No. of episodes: 89

Production
- Executive producer: Ernesto Alonso
- Producer: Luis Miguel Barona
- Production locations: Filming; Televisa San Ángel; Mexico City, Mexico; Locations
- Cinematography: Manuel Ángel Barajas; Víctor Soto
- Camera setup: Multi-camera
- Running time: 41–44 minutes
- Production company: Televisa

Original release
- Network: Canal de las Estrellas
- Release: May 20 – September 20, 2002

La otra (English: The Other Woman) is a Mexican telenovela produced by Ernesto Alonso for Televisa in 2002. It aired on Canal de las Estrellas from May 20 to September 20, 2002.

The telenovela stars Juan Soler, Yadhira Carrillo, Jacqueline Andere and Sergio Sendel.

This telenovela was a moderate success in Mexico, airing at 8 pm in the summer of 2002, right before the (usually) highest-rated hour of 9 pm. Over time, however, it has grown in popularity amongst telenovela fans of all kinds, thus making it a cult classic of sorts.

La otra was awarded the TVyNovelas Award for Best Telenovela in 2003.

== Plot ==
Carlota Guillén (Yadhira Carrillo) lives in Querétaro with her mother, Bernarda (Jacqueline Andere), and her older sister, Eugenia (Mercedes Molto).

Bernarda pretends to be a respectable lady, while, in fact, she used to be the lover of Leopoldo Guillén, a wealthy man from Guadalajara. Carlota is the latter's daughter and the half-sister of Román (Alejandro Ávila), who is Leopoldo's only legitimate son. When Román finds out that his father has divided his inheritance between him and the daughters of Bernanda, he plans revenge.

Carlota meets Álvaro Ibáñez (Juan Soler), a young doctor from Mexico City. Álvaro has a younger brother named Adrián (Sergio Sendel), who was adopted by his parents. In spite of the fact that their parents have always treated them both the same way, Adrián hates Álvaro.

Bernarda knows that when her daughters marry, she will have to hand over their share of the inheritance to them. Not wanting to lose control of the money, she always opposes any man approaching her daughters.

Nevertheless, Román manages to seduce Eugenia, leaving her pregnant. Eugenia dies due to complications from childbirth and, at the same time, Bernarda is led to believe that her grandchild was also born dead.

Upon hearing about the death of Bernarda's daughter, Álvaro thinks that the one who died was Carlota. Heartbroken, he leaves the city and goes to live with his parents in Morelos. There, Álvaro will meet Cordelia Portugal (Yadhira Carrillo), who is identical to Carlota. Taking advantage of it, Cordelia will take the place of The Other Woman.

== Cast ==
=== Main ===
- Juan Soler as Álvaro Ibáñez Posada
- Yadhira Carrillo as Carlota Guillén Sáenz "The Other Woman" / Cordelia Portugal Sánchez
- Jacqueline Andere as Bernarda Sáenz Rivas
- Sergio Sendel as Adrián Ibáñez Posada

=== Recurring and guest stars ===
- Manuel Ojeda as Juan Pedro Portugal
- Alejandro Ávila as Román Guillén Caballero
- Eugenio Cobo as Father Agustín
- Jorge Vargas as Delfino Arriaga
- Julio Bracho as Lázaro Arriaga
- Toño Mauri as Daniel Mendizábal
- Rosa María Bianchi as Guadalupe "Lupita" Posada de Ibáñez
- Azela Robinson as Mireya Ocampo Herrera
- Maty Huitrón as Fabiana Morales Rivas
- Mercedes Molto as Eugenia Guillén Sáenz
- Josefina Echánove as Tomasa López
- Alonso Echánove as Refugio "Cuco" Ríos
- Luis Couturier as Justo Ibáñez
- Sergio Sánchez as Saltiel Orozco
- Sergio Ramos "El Comanche" as Joaquín Pardo
- Verónica Jaspeado as Apolonia Portugal Sánchez
- Lupita Lara as Matilde Sánchez de Portugal
- Ignacio Guadalupe as Santos Mérida
- Roberto Antúnez as Father Fermín
- Elsa Cárdenas as Martha Caballero Viuda de Guillén
- Virginia Gutiérrez as Esperanza
- Fernando Robles as Fulgencio Ríos
- Gastón Tuset as Salvador Almanza
- Alfonso Iturralde as Narciso Bravo
- Zoila Quiñones as Simona Díaz
- María Prado as Martina Rubio
- Virginia Gimeno as Hilaria Rivero
- Isadora González as Paulina de Mendizábal
- David Ramos as Father Conrado
- Alberto Inzúa as Father Javier
- Antonio de la Vega as Isaac Gómez
- Carlos González as Benigno Mérida
- Rosángela Balbó as Socorro
- Lucy Tovar as Celina Chávez
- Thelma Dorantes as Carmen
- Shirley as Julieta Lugo de Guillén
- Esther Guilmáin as Esther
- Erika Blenher as Roberta
- Ofelia Guilmáin as Sabina Herrera Viuda de Ocampo
- Macaria as Fátima de Salazar
- Mónika Sánchez as Regina Salazar
- Juan Peláez as Enrique Salazar
- Carlos Speitzer as Librado Mérida Guillén
- Natasha Dupeyrón as Natalia Ibáñez Portugal
- Cosme Alberto as Braulio Portugal Rivero
- Annie del Castillo as Karen Mendizábal
- Constanza Mier as Aída

== Awards and nominations ==
Year	Award	Category	Nominee(s)	Result
2003	TVyNovelas Awards	Best Telenovela	Ernesto Alonso	Won
2003	TVyNovelas Awards	"Silvia Derbez" Award	Yadhira Carrillo	Won
2003	TVyNovelas Awards	Best Actor	Juan Soler	Won
2003	TVyNovelas Awards	Best Antagonist Actress	Jacqueline Andere	Nominated
2003	TVyNovelas Awards	Best Antagonist Actor	Sergio Sendel	Nominated
2003	TVyNovelas Awards	Best Leading Actress	Jacqueline Andere	Won
2003	TVyNovelas Awards	Best Supporting Actress	Azela Robinson	Nominated
2003	TVyNovelas Awards	Best Male Revelation	Julio Bracho	Nominated
2003	TVyNovelas Awards	Best Direction	Benjamín Cann	Won
2003	El Heraldo de México Awards	Best Telenovela	Ernesto Alonso	Won
2003	El Heraldo de México Awards	Special Award for Villain of the Year	Jacqueline Andere	Won
2003	El Heraldo de México Awards	Best Direction	Benjamín Cann	Won
2003	Palmas de Oro Awards	Best Antagonist Actress	Jacqueline Andere	Won
2003	INTE Awards	Production of the Year	Ernesto Alonso	Nominated
2003	INTE Awards	Actress of the Year	Yadhira Carrillo	Nominated
2003	INTE Awards	Actor of the Year	Juan Soler	Nominated
2003	INTE Awards	Supporting Actress of the Year	Jacqueline Andere	Nominated
2003	INTE Awards	Supporting Actor of the Year	Sergio Sendel	Nominated
2003	INTE Awards	Director of the Year	Benjamín Cann	Nominated
2003	INTE Awards	Screenwriter of the Year	Liliana Abud	Nominated
