= Tres mujeres =

Mexican telenovela

- Genre: Telenovela; Romance; Drama
- Created by: Martha Carrillo; Cristina García
- Written by: Martha Carrillo; Cristina García; Ximena Suárez; Virginia Quintana
- Directed by: Raúl Araiza; Gustavo Hernández; Julián Pastor; Lorenzo de Rodas
- Starring: Erika Buenfil; Alexis Ayala; Karyme Lozano; Jorge Salinas; Norma Herrera; Pedro Armendáriz Jr.
- Theme music composer: Ricardo Arjona
- Opening theme: "Desnuda" by Ricardo Arjona
- Ending theme: "Desnuda" by Ricardo Arjona
- Country of origin: Mexico
- Original language: Spanish
- No. of episodes: 280

Production
- Executive producer: Roberto Hernández Vázquez
- Producer: José Rendón
- Production locations: Filming; Televisa San Ángel; Mexico City, Mexico; Locations; Mexico City, Mexico; Canada
- Cinematography: Carlos Sánchez Zuñiga; Jesús Acuña Lee; Rogelio Valero
- Camera setup: Multi-camera
- Running time: 41-44 minutes (episodes 1-270); 21-22 minutes (episodes 271-280)
- Production company: Televisa

Original release
- Network: Canal de las Estrellas
- Release: March 22, 1999 – April 14, 2000

Tres mujeres (English title: Three women) is a Mexican telenovela produced by Roberto Hernández Vázquez for Televisa in 1999–2000. When it came out it was such a success that they added 3x the normal amount of chapters. There are 280 Chapters when there are normally about 100 chapters. The Telenovela ended in 2000, which made it the longest Telenovela produced by Televisa until Clase 406.

On March 22, 1999, Canal de las Estrellas started broadcasting Tres mujeres weekdays at 5:00pm, replacing Ángela. The last episode was broadcast on April 14, 2000, with Ramona replacing it the following Monday.

Erika Buenfil, Alexis Ayala, Karyme Lozano, Jorge Salinas, Norma Herrera and Pedro Armendáriz, Jr. portrayed the leading characters.

== Plot ==
Fatima (Karyme Lozano) is the youngest of the Uriate kids. She's going out with Adrian (Sergio Sendel), and Adrian is cheating on her with Brenda (Arleth Terán), who is his secretary. One night Fatima and Adrian have sex. After that night Adrian starts to abuse Fatima and even rapes her.

After this happens Fatima wants to break-up with him but she can't because her family was brought up that if you give yourself to a man you have to marry him or wait till marriage to have sex. Fatima later meets Sebastian (Jorge Salinas) at her job. He buys a sculpture of hers. She soon starts to feel something for Sebastian but she can't be with him because she is with Adrian.

She soon finds out that Adrian is cheating on her and she then starts to date Sebastian. Her and Sebastian fall madly in love but different things keep separating them. They are separated by Adrian; Verania (Susan Vohn), Sebastian ex-girlfriend from Canada; Carolina (Vanessa Guzmán), a model that works for Sebastian; and Leonardo(René Casados), Fatima's painter friend.

Fatima and Sebastian get married but on their Honeymoon Fatima finds out that Sebastian is having a baby with Carolina, so she leaves him and goes back to Mexico with Leonardo. Sebastian tries to get Fatima back but when she was going to accept him she catches him with Verania, but what Fatima didn't know is that the night before Sebastian and Daniel (Alexis Ayala) were drinking and he got drunk.

Verania took advantage of this and took his clothes off and put his shirt on to make look like they had sex. So again Fatima breaks up with him. Fatima then starts hanging with Leonardo and she eventually leaves for New York with him and tells Sebastian that when she comes back in a year she is going to divorce him. A year passes and Fatima is seeing Leonardo and living with 2 friends Loren (Sharis Cid) and Miriam (Isadora Gonzalez).

She tells Leonardo that she is going back to Mexico and he gets VERY angry with her because he doesn't want her to go without him and he has to stay. Leonardo is cheating on Fatima with Loren. So Fatima and Miriam go back to Mexico and there they see Sebastian with Sebastian Jr and Renata (Luz Maria Jerez).

Sebastian takes them home and talks to Fatima who desires him but can't be with him because Carolina, the mother of Sebastian Jr, says that if he and Fatima are together that he can't see his Son. Carolina goes to Fatima's house and starts yelling at her not to interfere with her and Sebastian. Fatima tells Sebastian, and Sebastian yells at Carolina and breaks-up with her.

Fatima and Sebastian get back together and they live with each other, but one day Leonardo tries raping Fatima. Sebastian walks in and see them, he goes to the dresser and grabs a gun first he points it to Leonardo then to Fatima because he thinks that she was cheating. Fatima ends up getting pregnant but not from Sebastian but from Leonardo because he raped her. She ends up losing the baby and she feels hurt, broken.

== Cast ==
- Erika Buenfil as Barbara Uriarte Saraldi
- Alexis Ayala as Daniel Subiri Sánchez
- Karyme Lozano as Fatima Uriarte Saraldi
- Jorge Salinas as Sebastian Méndez Morrison
- Norma Herrera as Greta Saraldi de Uriarte - Minski
- Pedro Armendáriz Jr. as Federico Mendez
- Guillermo Capetillo as Manuel Toscano
- Patricio Castillo as Gonzalo Uriarte
- Armando Araiza as Santiago Uriarte Saraldi
- Sergio Sendel as Adrian de la Fuente, villain
- Alejandro Tommasi as Mario Espinoza Sánchez
- Arleth Terán as Brenda Muñoz, villain
- Galilea Montijo as Maricruz Ruiz
- Raúl Ramírez as Frank Minski
- Eduardo Verástegui as Ramiro Belmont
- Luz María Jerez as Renata Gamboa
- Maite Embil as Andrea Ibañez
- Niurka Marcos as Yamilé Núñez
- Fabián Robles as Ángel Romero/Jose Ángel Belmont
- Lorenzo de Rodas as Vicente Sánchez
- Mariana Seoane as Marcela Durán
- Maya Mishalska as Paulina
- Ana Bertha Espín as Lucía Sánchez
- María Fernanda Rodríguez as Montserrat "Montse" Espinoza Uriarte
- Susan Vohn as Verania Grip
- Vanessa Guzmán as Carolina Fontaner
- Isadora González as Miriam Cohen
- Sergio Catalán as Valentin
- Maricarmen Vela as Jesusa
- Marina Marín as Ana de Gamboa
- Lucero Lander as Genoveva
- Laura Flores as Sandra María Aguírre
- Alejandro Camacho as Salvador Ortega, villain'
- René Casados as Leonardo Marcos, villain'
- Yolanda Mérida as Eva de la Parra
- Carlos Bracho as Dr. Salazar
- Dominika Paleta as Raquel Lerdo Muñoz
- Sergio Reynoso as Adolfo Treviño
- Isaura Espinoza as Diana Carmona
- Socorro Bonila as Aracely Durán
- Rosángela Balbo as Rosa María Sánchez
- Ninón Sevilla as Yolanda de Núñez
- Manuel "Flaco" Ibáñez as Héctor Gomís
- Ricardo Dalmacci as Claudio Altamirano, villain
- Gerardo Quiroz as Antonio Fernández
- Gabriela Platas as Carla Fonseca
- Luz María Zetina as Paloma
- Elizabeth Águilar as Nicole Bermúdez
- Paulino Hemmer as Lorenzo Toscano
- Diana Osorio as Verónica Toscano
- Rafael del Villar as Eduardo
- Sharis Cid as Loren Covarrubías
- Hugo Acosta as Rafael
- César Castro as Eugenio Gamboa
- Yadira Santana as Dr. Olivia Soler
- Manola Diez as Ximena
- Jana Raluy as Sonia
- María Prado as Meche
- Queta Lavat as Susana
- Silvio Fornaro as Diego Aguírre
- Mauricio Bonet as Tavo Galindo
- Theo Tapia as Don Pepe
- María Dolores Oliva as Rita
- Gabriela Araujo as Maggie de la Fuente
- Francisco Avendaño as Dr. Alberto Valero
- Miguel Serros as Nicolás
- Ricardo Chávez as Andrés
- Amira Cruzat as Dulce
- Juan Ángel Esparza as Rodrigo Balmori
- Carlos González as Miguel
- Jaime Hernes as Sergio
- María Idalia as Magda
- Bobby Larios as Mauro
- Jaime Lozano as Demetrio Lopez
- Bibelot Mansur as Gina
- Rubén Morales as Javier
- Martin Muñoz as Omar
- Polly as Sofía
- Luis Reynoso as Gabriel Uribe
- Adriana Rojo as Olga
- Juan Romanca as Carlos
- Javier Ruán as Flavio Guzmán
- Yessica Salazar as Esther
- Andrea Soberon as Macarena
- Carlos Soriano as Henry
- Abraham Stevans as Father Mateo
- Carlos Speitzer as Remigio
- Jorge Trejo as Renato
- Ricardo Vera as Fernando de la Fuente
- Jacqueline Voltaire as Melinda

== Awards and nominations ==
| Year | Award | Category | Nominee(s) | Result |
|---|---|---|---|---|
| 2000 | 18th TVyNovelas Awards | Best Telenovela | Roberto Hernández | Nominated |
| 2000 | 18th TVyNovelas Awards | Best Actress | Erika Buenfil | Nominated |
| 2000 | 18th TVyNovelas Awards | Best Actor | Jorge Salinas | Won |
| 2000 | 18th TVyNovelas Awards | Best Leading Actress | Norma Herrera | Won |
| 2000 | 18th TVyNovelas Awards | Best Supporting Actress | Maite Embil | Nominated |
| 2000 | 18th TVyNovelas Awards | Best Supporting Actor | Armando Araiza | Nominated |
| 2000 | 18th TVyNovelas Awards | Best Young Lead Actress | Karyme Lozano | Won |
| 2000 | 18th TVyNovelas Awards | Best Young Lead Actor | Jorge Salinas | Nominated |
| 2000 | Bravo Awards | Best Actress | Norma Herrera | Won |
| 2000 | Bravo Awards | Most Popular Television Hunk | Jorge Salinas | Won |
| 2000 | El Heraldo de México Awards | Female Revelation | Arleth Terán | Won |
| 2000 | Eres Awards | Best Telenovela | Roberto Hernández | Won |
| 2000 | Eres Awards | Best Actor | Jorge Salinas | Won |
