= Azela Robinson =

Mexican actress

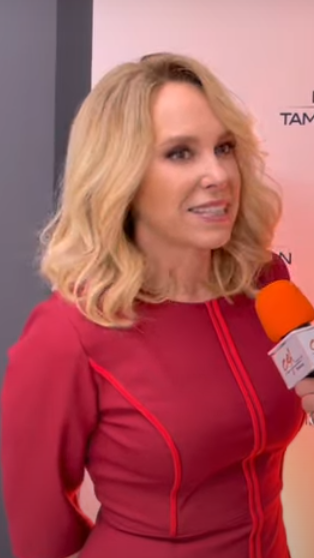
- Born: Azela Jacqueline Robinson Cañedo; 26 August 1965 (age 61); London, England, UK
- Citizenship: United Kingdom (by birthplace); Mexico (from mother)
- Education: Bristol Old Vic Theatre School
- Occupation: Actress
- Years active: 1990–present
- Spouse: Roberto Ballesteros (m. 1988; div. 1996)
- Children: 1

Azela Robinson (born Azela Jacqueline Robinson Cañedo on 26 August 1965) is a Mexican actress. She has portrayed antagonistic characters in the Mexican telenovelas Cañaveral de pasiones (1996), Contra viento y marea (2005), Llena de amor (2010) and Yo no creo en los hombres (2014).

== Early life ==
Azela Jacqueline Robinson was born in London, United Kingdom. Her mother, Nadja Cañedo is Mexican and her father, Alan Robinson is British.

She began her professional training as an actress in 1980 within the Bristol Old Vic Theatre School in Bristol, UK. Eventually, between 1982 and 1983 she took courses at the National Theatre in London.

== Career ==
=== Films ===
Once in Mexico, Robinson began her career as an actress in the movies. She debuted Fin de semana en Garibaldi" (1989), along with Jorge Reynoso. From that time until 1993, Robinson works on approximately 68 films, mainly comedy and action genres. Of them stand out ribbons like Sor Batalla (1990), with María Antonieta de las Nieves La Chilindrina; La mujer judicial (1990), again next to Mario Almada; El extensionista (1991), along with Eduardo Palomo; Mujer de cabaret (1991), directed by Julián Pastor, with Maribel Guardia and Leonardo Daniel; El trono del infierno (1992), with Sergio Goyri and Jorge Luke or Dama de Noche (1993), with Rafael Sánchez Navarro and Cecilia Toussaint, among others.

=== Television ===
Robinson made her Mexican TV debut in a chapter of the famous horror series La hora marcada, in 1990. In 1995 she got her first character in a telenovela with the hand of producer Enrique Segoviano in the telenovela Pobre niña rica, with Victoria Ruffo and singer Paulina Rubio. In 1996 she plays Dinorah Faberman, one of the most important and remembered characters of her career, in the telenovela Cañaveral de pasiones, produced by Humberto Zurita and Christian Bach and sharing credit with Daniela Castro, Juan Soler and Angelica Aragón, among others. Thanks to her interpretation, Robinson becomes one of the most outstanding villains of the Mexican telenovelas. As a villain, she works on melodramas like La usurpadora (1998), Laberintos de pasión (1999) and Mi destino eres tú (2000). In 2001 she interprets the role of Francisca, another of her personages more remembered in the telenovela El manantial, produced by Carla Estrada, next to Adela Noriega, Daniela Romo and Alejandro Tommasi. In 2002 she played one of her few non-antagonistic characters in the telenovela La Otra, produced by Ernesto Alonso. In 2005, she plays Apolonia, another of her most successful antagonistic characters in the telenovela Contra viento y marea, forming a famous dumbbell with actress Beatriz Sheridan.

In 2020, Robinson debuted as a director in the telenovela ¿Qué le pasa a mi familia? produced by Juan Osorio.

=== Theatre ===
Azela Robinson has participated in theatrical assemblies in Mexico. Of them they emphasise Todos a la piscina (1991), Trilogía amorosa (1993), the classic Who's Afraid of Virginia Woolf? (1995), with Rogelio Guerra and Juan Ignacio Aranda, directed by Enrique Rentería; La casa de Bernarda Alba (2002), by Federico García Lorca, along with the actresses Ofelia Guilmáin, Maria Rubio and Aurora Molina; Hombres (2005), with Patricia Reyes Spíndola, María Rojo and others; Orinoco (2007), directed by Benjamín Cann, along Cynthia Klitbo; El acrobata (2008), directed by Roberto D'Amico and next to Ricardo Fastlicht; Macbeth (2008), directed by Leonardo Ayala, with Mónica Dionne; Doce mujeres en pugna (2009), produced by Jorge Ortiz de Pinedo, along with Yolanda Mérida, Laura Zapata, Leticia Calderón and others; La ronda de las harpías (2009), with Ofelia Medina, Victoria Ruffo and Magda Guzmán; Tu tampoco eres normal (2011), directed by Humberto Zurita, next to Alexis Ayala; Baño de mujeres (2013), under the direction of Roberto D'Amico, with Sylvia Pasquel, Ofelia Medina and others, and Made in Mexico (2015), with Juan Ferrara, Rafael Inclán and Socorro Bonilla."Los negros pájaros del adiós" (2016) "Entre mujeres"2019 ((Edith Gozalez)) ((Ana Bertha Espín))

== Filmography ==
Film roles
Year	Title	Role	Notes
1991	El extensionista	Rarotonga	
1992	La dama y el judicial		
1993	Entre el amor y la muerte		
1998	Por Tu Culpa		
2018	Lady Rancho	Fatima	

Television roles
Year	Title	Role	Notes
1993	La última esperanza		
1995–1996	Pobre niña rica	Ana Luisa Cañedo de Villagrán	
1996	Cañaveral de pasiones	Dinorah Faberman	Main cast
1998	La usurpadora	Elvira	
1999–2000	Laberintos de pasión	Carmina Roldán de Valencia	
2000	Mi Destino Eres Tú	Isaura Becker	
2001	El Manantial	Francisca Rivero de Valdéz	
2002	La Otra	Mireya Ocampo Herrera	Main cast; 89 episodes
2003	Bajo la misma piel	Regina Ortiz Escalante	
2005	Contra viento y marea	Apolonia Rudell Serrano	Main cast
2006–2007	Mundo de fieras	Dolores Farías	Main cast; 117 episodes
2007	S.O.S.: Sexo y otros secretos	Lucía	Main cast (season 1)
2008–2009	Central de abasto	La Güera	88 episodes
2009	Adictos	Mónica	
2009	Sortilegio	Elena Miranda de Kruguer	
2009	Mujeres asesinas	Blanca	Episode: "María, pescadera"
2009	Tiempo final	Sonia	Episode: "Testigo"
2010–2011	Llena de amor	Fedra Curiel de Ruiz y de Teresa / Juana Felipa	Main cast
2011	La rosa de Guadalupe	Claudia	Episode: "La niña sicario"
2012	Cachito de cielo	Teresa "Tete" de Franco de Landeros	Main cast; 109 episodes
2013	Cásate conmigo, mi amor	Carmen	
2014–2015	Yo no creo en los hombres	Josefa	Main cast; 112 episodes
2016	Por siempre Joan Sebastian	Marissa	2 episodes
2016–2017	Vino el amor	Lilian Palacios	Main cast; 142 episodes
2018–2019	Por amar sin ley	Paula Ortega	Main cast; 122 episodes
2018–2021	Falsa identidad	Ramona Flores	Main cast; 150 episodes
2019	Cuna de lobos	Gélica Andrade	Main cast; 25 episodes
2020	Como tú no hay 2	Luz Maria Molina	Main cast; 75 episodes
2021	La desalmada	Martina Fernández	Main cast; 85 episodes
2022	Los ricos también lloran	Elena Suárez	Main cast; 60 episodes
2022	Mujer de nadie	Alejandra	Main cast; 45 episodes
2023	Cabo	Lucía de Noriega	Main cast; 35 episodes
2024	El amor no tiene receta	Elvira Moncada	Main cast
2025	La Jefa	Maribel Ortiz	Main cast
2025	Los hilos del pasado	María Luisa	Main cast

Theater roles
Year	Title	Role
1991	Todos a la Piscina	
1993	Trilogía amorosa	
1994	Cena de matrimonios	
1995	Quién le teme a Virginia Wolf	
2002	La casa de Bernarda Alba	
2005	Hombres	
2016–2017	Los negros pájaros del adiós	
2019	Entre mujeres	Carlota

== Awards and nominations ==
=== Premios TV y Novelas ===
Year	Award	Category	Telenovela	Result
1997	TVyNovelas Awards	Best Female Antagonist	Cañaveral de Pasiones	Nominated
2003	TVyNovelas Awards	Best Co-star Actress	La Otra	Nominated
2011	TVyNovelas Awards	Best Female Antagonist	Llena de amor	Nominated
2015	TVyNovelas Awards	Best Female Antagonist	Yo no creo en los hombres	Nominated
2015	TVyNovelas Awards	Favorite Villain	Yo no creo en los hombres	Won
2017	TVyNovelas Awards	Best Female Antagonist	Vino el amor	Won

Year	Award	Category	Telenovela /Film	Result
1995	Premios ACTP	Best Supporting Actress in a Drama	¿Quién teme a Virginia Wolf?	Won
2002	Premios ACTP	Best Supporting Actress in a Drama	La casa de Bernarda de Alba	Won
2003	Premios ACTP	Best Supporting Actress in a Theater	Cena de matrimonios	Won
2008	Premios ACTP	Best Actress	Macbeth	Won
1998	Premios ACE			Won
1999	Premios Sol de Oro	Best Supporting Actress	Laberintos de pasión	Won
1999	Premios ACE			Won
2000	Premios Palmas de Oro			Won
2000	Premios Gran Águila de Venezuela			Won
2001	Premios Palmas de Oro			Won
