= Preciosa (TV series) =

- Genre: Telenovela; Romance; Comedy; Drama
- Created by: Olga Ruilópez
- Written by: Alberto Gómez
- Directed by: Pedro Damián
- Starring: Irán Castillo; Mauricio Islas; Nailea Norvind; Francisco Gattorno; Roberto Ballesteros
- Opening theme: Girando en el tiempo by Irán Castillo
- Ending theme: Preciosa by Eduardo Antonio
- Country of origin: Mexico
- Original language: Spanish
- No. of episodes: 90

Production
- Executive producer: Pedro Damián
- Producers: Nicandro Díaz González; Georgina Castro
- Production locations: Filming; Televisa San Ángel; Mexico City, Mexico
- Running time: 41-44 minutes
- Production company: Televisa

Original release
- Network: Canal de las Estrellas
- Release: April 27 – August 28, 1998

Preciosa (English: Precious) is a Mexican telenovela produced by Pedro Damián for Televisa in 1998.

On Monday, April 27, 1998, Canal de las Estrellas started broadcasting Preciosa weekdays at 7:00pm, replacing Mi pequeña traviesa. The last episode was broadcast on Friday, August 28, 1998, with Soñadoras replacing it the following Monday.

Irán Castillo and Mauricio Islas starred as protagonists, while Nailea Norvind, Felicia Mercado, Roberto Ballesteros and Bertha Moss starred as antagonists.

== Cast ==
- Irán Castillo as Preciosa Ruiz/Estrella Ruiz
- Mauricio Islas as Luis Fernando Santander
- Nailea Norvind as Valeria San Román Valdivia de Santander
- Francisco Gattorno as Álvaro San Román
- Roberto Ballesteros as Sandor
- Susana González as Felina
- Alfonso Iturralde as Roberto San Román
- Felicia Mercado as Enriqueta Valdivia de San Román
- Ingrid Martz as Alma San Román
- Bertha Moss as Eduarda Santander
- Yula Pozo as Fermina
- Marcela Pezet as Lorena
- Luis Bayardo as Tito Ruiz
- Rodrigo Vidal as Leonel de la Riva
- Luis Gatica as Patricio
- Adriana Fonseca as Vanessa
- Carmen Salinas as Mamá Pachis
- Norma Lazareno as Regina de la Riva
- Luz Elena González as Milagros Ortiz
- Khotan as Ransel
- Sharis Cid as Zamira
- Mayrin Villanueva as Claudia Ortiz
- Héctor Suárez Gomís as Lorenzo "El Pantera" Ortiz
- Raúl Padilla "Chóforo" as Libardo
- Martha Ofelia Galindo as Chata
- Eduardo Antonio as Father Juan Martín
- René Casados as El Gran Sabu
- Mauricio Aspe as El Gasolina
- Osvaldo Benavides as Simón Ortiz
- David Larible as Payaso Ángel
- Uri Chartarifsky as Oscarito
- Manola Diez as Inés
- Alec Von Bargen as Orlando de la Riva
- Alizair Gómez as "El Pirulo"
- Dolores Salomón "Bodokito" as Finita
- Eduardo Iduñate as Andrés
- Francisco Rossell as Arturo
- Ligia Robles as Luz Elena
- Lisa Carbajal as Bianca
- Jorge Poza as Robin
- Ana Layevska as Princess
- Eduardo Rodríguez as Leopoldino
- Marieth Rodríguez as Rosalba Morantes/Miranda Barrios
- Miguel Ángel Cardiel as Ariel Robles
- Odiseo Bichir as Heriberto Robles
- María Antonieta de las Nieves as La Chilindrina

== Awards ==
Year	Award	Category	Nominee	Result
1999	17th TVyNovelas Awards	Best Supporting Actress	Carmen Salinas	Won
1999	17th TVyNovelas Awards	Best Young Lead Actress	Irán Castillo	Nominated
1999	17th TVyNovelas Awards	Best Young Lead Actor	Mauricio Islas	Nominated
