= De pocas, pocas pulgas =

Mexican telenovela for children

- Genre: Telenovela
- Based on: El abuelo y yo by Lorena Salazar & Eduardo Quiroga
- Developed by: Martha Oláiz; Tania Bertrán; Antonio Abascal
- Directed by: Lily Garza; Arturo García Tenorio
- Starring: Ignacio López Tarso; Joana Benedek; Gerardo Murguía; René Strickler; Sergio Corona; Santiago Mirabent; Natasha Dupeyron; Arleth Terán; Alejandro Ávila; Gabriel de Cervantes
- Theme music composer: Rubén Zepeda
- Opening theme: "De pocas, pocas pulgas" by Santiago Mirabent, Natasha Dupeyrón, Vadhir Derbez & Nancy Patiño
- Composer: Saúl Torres
- Country of origin: Mexico
- Original language: Spanish
- No. of seasons: 1
- No. of episodes: 100

Production
- Executive producer: Mapat L. de Zatarain
- Producer: Marco Vinicio López de Zatarain
- Editors: Gabriela Torres; Salvador Solorio

Original release
- Network: Canal de las Estrellas
- Release: March 17 – August 1, 2003

De pocas, pocas pulgas is a Mexican telenovela for children, produced by Mapat L. de Zatarain for Televisa in 2003. It is an adaptation of the 1992 telenovela El abuelo y yo.

It stars Ignacio López Tarso, Joana Benedek, Gerardo Murguía, Santiago Mirabent, Natasha Dupeyrón.

== Plot ==
Danilo is a boy with a positive attitude and an inner strength that nothing in the world can break. He has to work hard to buy food for himself and his dog Tomás, who is his best friend. Danilo looks forward to his mother coming back one day. Due to the circumstances, he will meet an old man, Don Julián, and they will unite the joy of childhood with the wisdom of age. In addition, Danilo will meet a rich girl, Alejandra, with a totally different life from his. However, her affection is so great that they become best friends, despite the difference in social class.

== Cast ==
- Ignacio López Tarso as Don Julián Montes
- Joana Benedek as Reneé de Lastra
- Gerardo Murguía as Alonso Lastra
- René Strickler as Adrián
- Sergio Corona as Benito
- Santiago Mirabent as Danilo Fernández
- Natasha Dupeyrón as Alejandra "Alex" Lastra
- Arleth Terán as Mireya Garníca
- Alejandro Ávila as Lorenzo Valverde
- Gabriel de Cervantes as Victoriano Vázquez
- María Victoria as Inés
- Imanol Landeta as Rolando
- Joana Brito as Lola
- Julio Vega as Don Lupe
- Maribel Fernández as Gladys
- Ricardo de Pascual as Don Octavio Guerra
- Agustín Arana as Claudio Zapata
- Rocío Sobrado as Genoveva de Valverde
- Edgar Alexen as Salim
- Ricardo Crespo as Guillermo "Memo"
- Claudia Elisa Aguilar as Encarnación
- Nancy Patiño as Genoveva "La Beba" Valverde
- Yurem Rojas as Antonio "Toño"
- Alex Perea as Perico
- Vadhir Derbez as Odilon "Chorizo"
- Carlos Miguel Szavozd as Ramón "Jamón"
- Joseph Sasson as Maximiliano Alanis Valverde
- Óscar Eugenio as Tobías
- Cristiane Aguinaga as Ximena
- Florencia Cuenca as Carmela
- Danna Paola as Annie
- Juan Ignacio Aranda as young Julián Montes
- Diego Barquinero as Payasito
- Julio Camejo as Noel
- Rubén Cerda as Bruno
- Luis Fernando Torres as Gabriel "Gabo"
- Sergio Jiménez as El Viudo
- Fabián Lavalle as Fabián
- Aurora Molina as Madre Socorro
- Patricia Reyes Spíndola as Griselda
- Lourdes Reyes as Rocío Montes de Fernández
- Patricia Romero as Leonora
- Mickey Santana as Gastón
- Francisco Naal as Gabriel
- Kelchie Arizmendi as Cristina

== Soundtrack ==
De pocas, pocas pulgas

Soundtrack album by Various artists
- Released: 2003
- Length: 39:17
- Label: Universal Music México

No.	Title	Writer(s)	Performer(s)	Length
1.	"De Pocas, Pocas Pulgas"	Rubén Zepeda	Santiago Mirabent; Natasha Dupeyrón; Vadhir Derbez; Nancy Patiño	3:36
2.	"Llegó El Amor"	R. Zepeda	Santiago Mirabent; Natasha Dupeyrón	4:04
3.	"Mi Perro Tomás"	Sue y Javier	Santiago Mirabent	3:37
4.	"Como Te Ves Me Veré"	R. Zepeda	Santiago Mirabent	3:37
5.	"Respeta Sus Vidas (Animales)"	R. Zepeda	Vadhir Derbez	4:20
6.	"Papá Domingo"	Sue y Javier	Natasha Dupeyrón	2:44
7.	"La Pandilla"	Poncho Cabrera	Imanol Landeta	2:36
8.	"¿Dónde Estás Mamá?"	R. Zepeda	Santiago Mirabent	3:31
9.	"El Baile De La Pulga"	R. Zepeda	Vadhir Derbez; Natasha Dupeyrón	3:32
10.	"La Aventura"	Cabrera	Vadhir Derbez; Nancy Patiño; Joseph Sasson; Cristiane Aguinaga	4:01
11.	"Todos Para Uno, Uno Para Todos"	Alex Zepeda	Santiago Mirabent; Natasha Dupeyrón; Vadhir Derbez	3:00
Total length:				39:17

== Awards and nominations ==
Year	Award	Category	Recipient	Result
2003	21st TVyNovelas Awards	Best Leading Actress	María Victoria	Nominated
2003	21st TVyNovelas Awards	Best Leading Actor	Ignacio López Tarso	Won
2003	21st TVyNovelas Awards	Best Supporting Actor	Sergio Corona	Nominated
