= Karyme Lozano =

Mexican actress (born 1978)

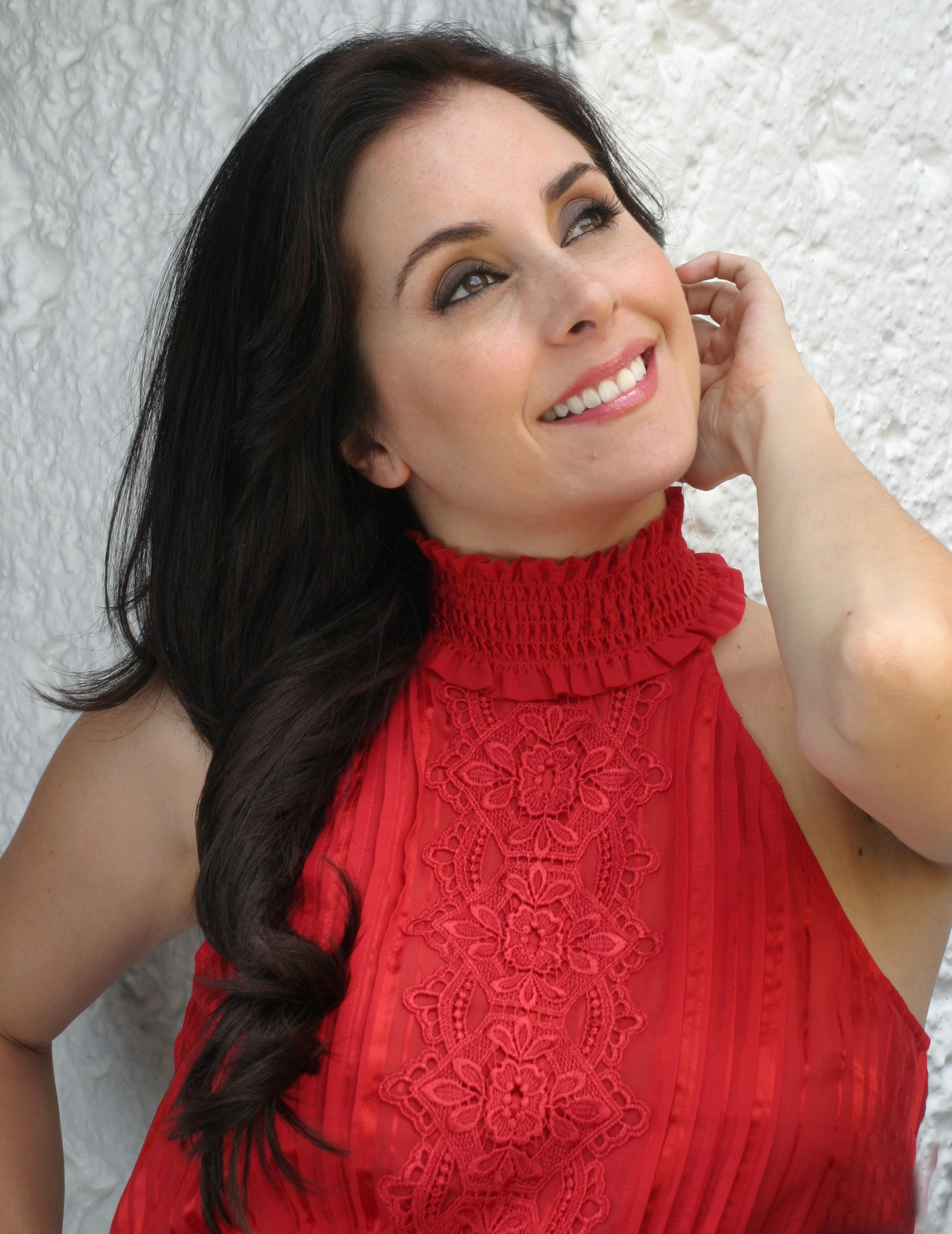
- Born: Karyme Lucía Virginia Lozano Carreno; April 3, 1978 (age 48); Mexico City, Mexico
- Other name: Kary
- Occupation: Actress
- Years active: 1994–present

Karyme Lozano (Spanish pronunciation: [kaˈɾime loˈsano]; born Karyme Lucía Virginia Lozano Carreno on April 3, 1978) is a Mexican actress. She has appeared on three covers of Los 50 Mas Bellos of People en Español. She has been nominated and won several awards for Best Actress including for Premios TVyNovelas and Las Palmas de Oro.

== Career ==
Lozano is a well-known Mexican actress who has appeared in many Televisa telenovelas including Volver a Empezar (1994), Si Dios Me Quita La Vida (1995), Confidente de Secundaria (1996), Pueblo Chico, Infierno Grande (1998), Amar Sin Límites, 1999–2000 series Tres mujeres, El Manantial, Niña amada mía (which aired on Univision simultaneously) and the Venevisión telenovela Soñar no Cuesta Nada, entirely shot in Miami, Florida.

TV series she has participated in include Mujeres Asesinas (HBO Latino) in its second season, the Colombian series Tiempo Final (Canal Fox), and Mujer, Casos de la Vida Real.

Lozano has also participated in theater in plays such as Anastasia, Cinderella and Grease, with the role of Sonia.

In 2004 she played the lead role in the film Desnudos, an artist physically and mentally abused by her boyfriend, a performance that earned her a nomination for an Ariel Award.

In 2010 Lozano made her debut on U.S. movie screens with For Greater Glory (Cristiada) alongside Eva Longoria and Andy Garcia. Later she wrote and directed her first short film, The True Meaning of Love, which was accepted by several film festivals in the United States.

In 2017 Lozano participated in the season finale episodes of Kevin Can Wait on CBS alongside Kevin James.

Lozano is represented by Shoreline Management as an actress, writer, and director.

== Filmography ==
Films
Year	Title	Role	Notes
2003	El hecho imposible		
2003	Ladies' Night	Policewoman	
2004	Desnudos	Diana	
2004	Bandido	Rosalía	
2009	Pepe & Santo vs. América	Isabel	
2012	Cristiada	Doña María del Río	
2014	Hijo de Dios	Santa Claudia Prócula	Mexican version

Television
Year	Title	Role	Notes
1994-95	Volver a Empezar	Liliana	Supporting role
1995	Si Dios me quita la vida	Esther "Teté" Román Sánchez	Supporting role
1996	Confidente de secundaria	Marilú	Supporting role
1997	Pueblo chico, infierno grande	Braulia Felícitas María de la Salud Serna	Supporting role
1997	El secreto de Alejandra	Vanessa	Supporting role
1997	Mujer, casos de la vida real		
1999-2000	Tres mujeres	Fátima Uriarte Saraldi	Main role
2001-02	El Manantial	Bárbara Luna Ramírez	Series regular
2003	Niña amada mía	Isabela Soriano Rivera	Main role
2005-06	Soñar no cuesta nada	Emilia Olivares Alvarez	Main role
2006–07	Amar sin límites	Azul Toscano/Azucena	Main role
2009	Mujeres asesinas	Ana Beltran	Episode: "Ana y Paula, ultrajadas"
2012	El talismán	Mariana Aceves de Ibarra	Supporting role
2013-14	Quiero amarte	Amaya Serrano Martínez/Florencia Martínez de Serrano	Main role
2017	Kevin Can Wait	Maritza	
2022-23	Mi secreto	Daniela Estrada	Series regular
2023	Minas de pasión	Aleida Cervantes	Series regular
2024	Mi amor sin tiempo	Renata	Series regular
2025	Me atrevo a amarte	Diana Paz Aguilar	

== Awards and nominations ==
=== Premios TVyNovelas ===
Year	Category	Telenovela	Result
2000	Best Young Lead Actress	Tres mujeres	Won
2002	Best Female Antagonist	El Manantial	Nominated
2003	Best Lead Actress	Niña amada mía	Nominated
2007	Best Lead Actress	Amar Sin Límites	Nominated
