= Alejandro Tommasi =

Mexican television, stage and film actor (born 1957)

- Born: Alejandro Casares Tommasi; August 14, 1957 (age 68); Mexico City, Mexico
- Occupation: Actor
- Years active: 1980–present

Alejandro Tommasi (born Alejandro Casares Tommasi; August 14, 1957) is a Mexican television, stage and film actor.

== Personal life ==
Tommasi is of Italian descent. Tommasi came out as gay and married his 35-year old boyfriend, Óscar Ruiz, in September 2011, after 10 years of relationship. In 2015 Tommasi filed for divorce from Ruiz due to abuse. One year later Tommasi proposed again to Ruiz in June 2016. On April 10, 2017, the couple got married in Las Vegas, United States.

== Filmography ==
=== Television ===
Year	Title	Role	Notes
1980-81	Colorina	Doménico	Supporting role
1981	El hogar que yo robé	Daniel	Supporting role
1982-83	Gabriel y Gabriela		
1982-83	Bianca Vidal	Dr. Torres	Supporting role
1984-86	Principessa	César	Supporting role
1984	Guadalupe		
1986	Monte Calvario	Caleta Montero	
1986	Martin Garatuza		
1988-89	El extraño retorno de Diana Salazar	Adrián Alfaro	Supporting role
1989-90	Carrusel	Alberto del Salto	Supporting role
1989	Papá soltero		
1990-91	En carne propia	Alexis Ortega "El Albino"	Supporting role
1993	Capricho	Tomás Ruiz	Supporting role
1993	Acapulco H.E.A.T.	Doctor Ramirez	
1994-95	Imperio de cristal	Octavio Lombardo Montiel	Supporting role
1995	Bajo un mismo rostro	Manuel Gorostiaga	Guest star
1995-96	María la del Barrio	Dr. Keller	Guest star
1995-96	Retrato de familia	Nicolás Negrete	Main role
1996	La antorcha encendida	José Nicolás de Michelena	Supporting role
1996-97	Luz Clarita	Padre Salvador Uribe	Supporting role
1996-2000	Mujer, Casos de la Vida Real		
1997	Pueblo chico, infierno grande	Malfavón Heredia	Supporting role
1999-00	Tres mujeres	Mario Espinosa Sánchez	Supporting role
2000	Siempre te amaré	Octavio Elizondo	Supporting role
2000-01	Carita de ángel	Jaime Alberto	Supporting role
2001-02	El Manantial	Justo Ramírez	Main role
2003-04	Bajo la misma piel	Eugenio Rioja	Main role
2004	Amy, la niña de la mochila azul	Claudio Rosales	Main role
2005-2006	Alborada	Felipe Alvarado Solares	Supporting role
2005	Bajo el mismo techo	Genaro Garza	
2006	La hora pico		Guest
2007	Destilando Amor	Bruno Montalvo Gil	Supporting role
2007-2008	Tormenta en el paraíso	Eliseo Bravo	Supporting role
2009	Los simuladores	Lombardi	
2009	Tiempo final	Jeremías Santana	
2009	Hermanos y detectives		
2009	Sortilegio	Samuel Albeniz	Guest star
2010	Gritos de muerte y libertad	Miguel Hidalgo y Costilla	
2010	Mujeres asesinas	Alfonso	
2011	La fuerza del destino	Gerardo Lomelí	Supporting role
2013	Wild at Heart	Bartolomé Montenegro	Supporting role
2013	Mentir para Vivir	Gabriel Sánchez Fernandez	Guest star
2013	Como dice el dicho	Humberto	
2013-14	Quiero amarte	Omar Vásquez	Supporting role
2014-15	Hasta el fin del mundo	Fausto Rangel	Supporting role
2016	Corazón que miente	Demián Ferrer Bilbatúa	Main role
2017	La doble vida de Estela Carrillo	Mr. Blake	Supporting role
2017	Hoy voy a cambiar	Ernesto Alonso	Guest star
2018	La rosa de Guadalupe	Roberto de los Monteros	
2018-19	Por amar sin ley	Nicolás Morelli	Guest star (season 1); Supporting role (season 2)
2020-21	Quererlo todo	Aarón Estrada	Supporting role
2022	Contigo sí	Imanol Yazbek	Guest star
2022	Hasta que la plata nos separe	Benjamín Maldonado	Supporting role
2023	Tierra de esperanza	Esteban Arteaga	Supporting role
2025	Juegos de amor y poder	Francisco Avendaño	
2025	Doménica Montero	Andrés Solana Cruz	

=== Films ===
- Cuando las cosas suceden as Sebastian Serratos (2007)
- Cementerio de papel (2007)
- Espinas as Huker (2005)
- Huapango as Otilio (2004)
- El Misterio de los almendros as Don Joaquin (2004)
- El Nahual (2004)
- Blind Heat as Mauricio (2002)
- Dark Cities (Ciudades oscuras) as Rubio (2002)
- Por la libre as Luis (2000)
- Sofia (2000)
- Si nos dejan (1999)
- Las Noches de aventurera as Bugambilia (1998)
- El Regreso del gato (1998)
- El Gato de la sierra (1997)
- Sobrenatural as Andres Berthier (1996)
- Coleccionistas as Orador (1996)
- La Crisalida (1996)
- Parabola (1995)
- Perfume, efecto inmediato (1994)
- Cita con la muerte as Rafael (1989)
- Zapata en Chinameca (1987)
- Rumbotica (1987)
- Te invitamos (1986)

== Awards and nominations ==
=== TVyNovelas Awards ===
Year	Category	Telenovela	Result
1995	Best Co-star Actor	Imperio de cristal	Nominated
1996	Best Male Antagonist	Retrato de familia	Nominated
2002	Best Male Antagonist	El Manantial	Won
2008	Best Co-star Actor	Destilando Amor	Won
2009	Best Male Antagonist	Tormenta en el paraíso	Nominated

=== Premios Bravo ===
Year	Category	Telenovela	Result
2002	Best Male Antagonist	El Manantial	Won

=== Premios El Heraldo de México ===
Year	Category	Telenovela	Result
2002	Best Actor on Television	El Manantial	Nominated

=== Premios Diosa de Plata ===
Year	Category	Telenovela	Result
2005	Best Actor on Film	Huapango	Won

=== Premios de la Asociación de Cronistas y Periodistas Teatrales (ACPT) ===
Year	Category	Telenovela	Result
2013	Best Actor on Comedy	Menage a trois	Nominated

=== Premios de la Agrupación de Periodistas Teatrales (APT) ===
Year	Category	Telenovela	Result
1990	Ignacio López Tarso Award for Best Actor	El Dandy del Hotel Savoy	Won
1998	Ignacio López Tarso Award for Best Actor	Aventurera	Won
2013	Ignacio López Tarso Award for Best Actor	Menage a trois	Nominated

=== Premios de la Asociación Mexicana de Críticos de Teatro (AMCT) ===
Year	Category	Telenovela	Result
1990	Best Actor	El Dandy del Hotel Savoy	Won
1993	Best Actor	Festival de teatro de S. de Oro	Won
1998	Best Actor	Aventurera	Won

=== Premios Califa de Oro ===
Year	Category	Telenovela	Result
2010	Best Actor	Gritos de muerte y libertad	Won
