= Primer amor, a mil por hora =

Mexican telenovela

- Also known as: Primer amor... a 1000 × hora
- Genre: Telenovela
- Created by: Jorge Durán Chávez; Edmundo Báez; René Muñoz
- Written by: María Cervantes Balmori; Issa López
- Directed by: Luis Pardo; Eloy Ganuza; Martín Álvarez
- Starring: Kuno Becker; Anahí; Mauricio Islas
- Theme music composer: Carlos Lara
- Opening theme: "A mil por hora" by Lynda
- Ending theme: "Juntos" by Anahí & Kuno Becker
- Country of origin: Mexico
- Original language: Spanish
- No. of episodes: 100 +1 after-finale special

Production
- Executive producer: Pedro Damián
- Producer: Luis Luisillo Miguel
- Production locations: Filming; Televisa San Ángel; Mexico City, Mexico
- Cinematography: Carlos Sánchez Ross; Vivian Sánchez Ross
- Camera setup: Multi-camera
- Running time: 41-44 minutes (episodes 1-100); 88 minutes (episode 101)
- Production company: Televisa

Original release
- Network: Canal de las Estrellas
- Release: October 9, 2000 – February 23, 2001

Related
- Quinceañera (1987-1988); Miss XV (2012)

Primer amor, a mil por hora (English: First Love at a Thousand Miles Per Hour) is a Mexican telenovela produced by Pedro Damián for Televisa in 2000. It is a remake of another Televisa telenovela titled Quinceañera. This teen-oriented soap was one of the highest-rated in its time slot.

On Monday, October 9, 2000, Canal de las Estrellas started broadcasting Primer amor, a mil por hora weekdays at 7:00pm, replacing Locura de amor. The last episode was broadcast on Friday, February 23, 2001 with Amigas y rivales replacing it the following Monday.

Anahí, Kuno Becker, Ana Layevska and Valentino Lanús starred as protagonists, while Mauricio Islas, Leticia Perdigón, Arleth Terán and Fabián Robles starred as antagonists.

== Cast ==
- Anahí as Giovanna Luna Guerra
- Kuno Becker as León Baldomero
- Ana Layevska as Marina Iturriaga Camargo
- Valentino Lanús as Imanol Jáuregui Tasso
- Mauricio Islas as Demian Ventura
- Arleth Terán as Priscila Luna Guerra
- Alexa Damián as Emilia Baldomero
- Fabián Robles as Santiago García "La Iguana"
- Leticia Perdigón as Catalina Guerra de Luna
- José Elías Moreno as Esteban Luna
- Sebastián Ligarde as Antonio Iturriaga
- Mariagna Prats as Pilar Camargo de Iturriaga
- Manuel "Flaco" Ibáñez as Conrado Baldomero
- Arturo García Tenorio as Indalesio Cano
- José María Torre as Bruno Baldomero
- Aitor Iturrioz as Boris
- Daniela Luján as Sabrina Luna Guerra
- Socorro Bonilla as Milagros García
- Beatriz Moreno as Benita Morales
- Blanca Sánchez as Andrea Camargo
- Héctor Gómez as Fernán Camargo
- Pilar Pellicer as La Chonta
- Alfredo Ahnert as Luis Fernando "Fher"
- Damián Mendiola as Vinnie Montijo
- Mauricio Aspe as Rodolfo "Rudy"
- Rafael Bazán as El Morrito Cano
- Enrique Borja Baena as Ricardo "Richard"
- Gabriela Cano as Melissa Molina
- Roxana Castellanos as Ana Lozano
- Ehécatl Chávez as Tirilo
- Ricardo Chávez as Sebastián Olivares
- Judy Ponte as Jazmín / Rosaura Santa Cruz
- Liuba de Lasse as Lourdes "Lulú" Durán
- Jackeline del Vecchio as Aura
- Kika Edgar as Olivia
- Sebastián Rulli as Mauricio
- Alan Gutiérrez as Enrique #1
- Renato Bartilotti as Enrique #2
- Karen Juantorena as Itzel
- Adriana Laffan as Dorita
- Felipe Nájera as Valente Montijo
- Carla Ortiz as Gina
- Flavio Peniche as Poncho
- Juan José Peña as Comandante Merino
- Axel Ricco as Huicho
- Eduardo Rivera as Artemio
- Karime Saab as Ana's Assistant
- Damián Sarka as Diego Ulloa
- Pedro Sicard as Claudio
- Laisha Wilkins as Tamara
- Sergio Sánchez as Ivan
- Patricia Martínez as Bernarda
- Julio Sánchez as Mariano
- Susan Vohn as Bárbara Smith
- Alec Von Bargen as Adrián
- Arturo Vázquez as Cienfuegos
- Dulce María as Brittany
- Khotan as José Crescencio Martínez
- Lourdes Canale as Susana
- Luis Carillo as Dimitri
- Arturo Barba as Beto
- Alizair Gómez as Julio
- Lucero Lander as Inés
- Anabel Gutiérrez as Ella
- Julio Camejo
- Mauricio Barcelata

== Soundtrack ==
- 2000: Primer amor... a mil por hora Album.
- "Primer amor" by Anahí
- "A mil por hora" by Lynda
- "Juntos" by Anahí & Kuno Becker

== Awards and nominations ==
Year	Award	Category	Nominee	Result
2001	19th TVyNovelas Awards	Best Telenovela	Pedro Damián	Nominated
2001	19th TVyNovelas Awards	Best Actress	Anahí	Nominated
2001	19th TVyNovelas Awards	Best Antagonist Actor	Mauricio Islas	Nominated
2001	19th TVyNovelas Awards	Best Supporting Actress	Arleth Terán	Won
2001	19th TVyNovelas Awards	Best Supporting Actor	Fabián Robles	Nominated
2001	19th TVyNovelas Awards	Best Female Revelation	Ana Layevska	Won
2001	19th TVyNovelas Awards	Best Male Revelation	Valentino Lanús	Won
2001	19th TVyNovelas Awards	Best Musical Theme	"A mil por hora" by Lynda	Nominated
2001	19th TVyNovelas Awards	Best Direction of the Cameras	Carlos Sánchez Ross; Vivian Sánchez Ross	Won
2001	19th TVyNovelas Awards	Best Kiss	Ana Layevska; Valentino Lanús	Won
2001	19th TVyNovelas Awards	Best Fight	Kuno Becker; Mauricio Islas	Won
2001	19th TVyNovelas Awards	Best Action Sequence	Kuno Becker; Mauricio Islas	Won
2001	El Heraldo de México Awards	Male Revelation	Valentino Lanús	Won
2001	Eres Awards	Best Telenovela	Pedro Damián	Won
2001	Eres Awards	Best Actress	Anahí	Won
2001	Eres Awards	Best Debut	Ana Layevska	Won
2001	Eres Awards	Best Debut	Valentino Lanús	Won
2001	Eres Awards	Best Musical Theme	"A mil por hora" by Lynda	Won
