= Alejandra García (actress) =

Mexican actress (born 1991)

- Born: May 26, 1991 (age 35); León, Guanajuato, Mexico
- Other name: Ale García
- Occupation: Actress
- Years active: 2008-present

Alejandra García (born May 26, 1991, León, Guanajuato, Mexico), is a Mexican actress.

== Television roles ==
Year	Title	Role	Notes
2011-2012	Una familia con suerte	Guadalupe "Lupita" López Torrés	Young Protagonist
2013-2014	Lo que la vida me robó	Nadia Argüelles de Medina	Supporting Role
2015	Qué te perdone Dios	Young Macaria Ríos	Special participation
2015	Amor de barrio	Laura Vasconcelos Arriaga	Co-Protagonist
2017	El Bienamado	Tania Solis Mendoza	Young Protagonist
2017-2018	Me declaro culpable	Katia Romo	Antagonist
2019	Por amar sin ley	Lorena Fuentes	Supporting Role (season 2)
2020-2021	Vencer el desamor	Romina Inunza	Supporting Role
2021	La desalmada	Rosalina Santos	Supporting Role

== Awards and nominations ==
Year	Association	Category	Nominated	Result
2012	Premios TVyNovelas	Best Female Revelation	Una familia con suerte	Won
