= Niña amada mía (TV series) =

- Genre: Telenovela
- Based on: Las amazonas by César Miguel Rondón
- Written by: Juan Carlos Alcalá
- Screenplay by: Gabriela Ortigoza
- Directed by: Alfredo Gurrola
- Creative director: Juan José Urbini
- Starring: Sergio Goyri; Karyme Lozano
- Music by: Jorge Avendaño
- Opening theme: "Niña amada mía" by Alejandro Fernández
- Country of origin: Mexico
- Original language: Spanish
- No. of episodes: 109

Production
- Executive producer: Angelli Nesma Medina
- Producer: Ignacio Alarcón
- Cinematography: Gilberto Macín
- Editors: Alfredo Juárez; Daniel Rentería; Octavio López
- Camera setup: Multi-camera
- Production company: Televisa

Original release
- Network: Canal de las Estrellas
- Release: January 27 – June 27, 2003

Related
- Quirpa de tres mujeres; Las bandidas; Las amazonas

Niña amada mía (English: My Lovely Girl) is a Mexican telenovela produced by Angelli Nesma Medina for Televisa in 2003. It is an adaptation of the 1985 Venezuelan telenovela Las amazonas.

On Monday, January 27, 2003, Canal de las Estrellas started broadcasting Niña amada mía weekdays at 8:00pm, replacing Así son ellas. The last episode was broadcast on Friday, June 27, 2003, with Velo de novia replacing it on Monday, June 30, 2003.

The series stars Karyme Lozano, Sergio Goyri, Mayrín Villanueva, Otto Sirgo, Ludwika Paleta and Julio Mannino.

== Plot ==
Clemente Soriano (Eric del Castillo) is a wealthy, tough and dominant landowner, who was widowed when his three daughters were little. Paz (Isaura Espinoza), the housekeeper, has been like a second mother to Isabela (Karyme Lozano), Diana (Mayrín Villanueva) and Carolina (Ludwika Paleta).

Isabela Soriano is a beautiful young woman, proud and indomitable, but at the same time generous and with noble feelings. She studied administration and is in charge of the business of her father, Clemente. She looks askance at Karina (Mercedes Molto), her father's new young wife, because she is sure that she married him for his money.

Isabela breaks off her engagement to César (Juan Pablo Gamboa), who is favored by Clemente, because she has fallen in love with Víctor (Sergio Goyri), the handsome veterinarian who cares for the family's show jumping horses. However, from the beginning, this passionate love will be marked by intrigue, both on the part of Karina, who obsessively desires Víctor, and on the part of César, who is not willing to give up the Soriano fortune.

Diana, Clemente's second daughter, joins the prestigious architectural firm of Octavio Uriarte (Otto Sirgo), without knowing that this man, whom she respects and admires, and his mother, Socorro (Emilia Carranza), are the worst enemies of her father, since they are convinced that Clemente murdered Servando Uriarte, Octavio's brother, to take over his fortune and his wife.

When Clemente finds out that his daughter works for Octavio, he demands that she resign, but she refuses, arguing that it is a great professional opportunity for her, although deep down she knows that the real reason is that she has fallen in love with Octavio and is reciprocated. But this will turn out to be a love full of setbacks and obstacles, not only due to the enmity of their families but also due to the age difference.

Carolina is a free spirit who does not believe in ties, until Pablo (Julio Mannino), Paz's son and now the person in charge of the care and maintenance of the horses on the family ranch, awakens an intense and passionate love in her. But Clemente opposes this relationship with alarming fury and Carolina's newfound happiness collapses when Pablo walks away from her without explanation.

== Cast ==
=== Main ===
- Sergio Goyri as Víctor Izaguirre
- Karyme Lozano as Isabela Soriano

=== Also main ===
- Eric del Castillo as Clemente Soriano
- Otto Sirgo as Octavio Uriarte
- Roberto Ballesteros as Melchor Arrieta
- Isaura Espinoza as Paz Guzmán
- Mayrín Villanueva as Diana Soriano
- Ludwika Paleta as Carolina Soriano

=== Recurring ===
- Mercedes Molto as Karina Sánchez de Soriano
- Antonio Medellín as Pascual Criollo
- Cecilia Gabriela as Consuelo Mendiola de Izaguirre
- Emilia Carranza as Socorro Viuda de Uriarte
- Norma Lazareno as Judith Viuda de Rincón del Valle
- Mariagna Prats as Mariagna Prats "The Painter"
- Luis Gatica as Jorge Esparza
- Socorro Bonilla as Casilda de Criollo
- Arlette Pacheco as Zulema Contreras
- Juan Pablo Gamboa as César Fábregas
- Eugenia Cauduro as Julia Moreno
- Paty Martínez as Trinidad "Trini" Osuna
- Myrrah Saavedra as Gloria de Arrieta
- Polly as Lawyer Ibáñez
- Óscar Traven as Alvarado
- Roberto Damico as Hurtado
- Fernando Robles as Robles
- Rafael Amador as Agent Pérez
- Sergio Sánchez as Lieutenant Ibarra
- Rafael del Villar as Landeta
- Ricardo Vera as Arizmendi
- Roberto Palazuelos as Rafael Rincón del Valle
- Julio Mannino as Pablo Guzmán
- Jan as Mauricio Barocio
- Jorge de Silva as Ringo
- Giovan Ramos as Édgar Toledo
- Yuliana Peniche as Luz Arrieta
- Óscar Ferreti as Horacio Rivero

=== Guest stars ===
- Isaac Castro as José "Pepe" Mejía
- José Antonio Ferral as Pedro
- Florencia Ferret as Gladys
- Citalli Galindo as Dr. Susana Iturbide
- Janina Hidalgo as Ángeles
- Lucía Leyba as Beatriz "Betty"
- Raúl Magaña as Danilo Duarte
- Bibelot Mansur as Sofía "Chofi"
- Rubén Morales as Lieutenant Manuel Arroyo
- Víctor Noriega as Servando Uriarte
- María Fernanda Rodríguez as Ximena Izaguirre Mendiola
- Jorge Pascual Rubio as Lieutenant Luis Ochoa
- Marisol Santacruz as Isabela de Uriarte / de Soriano
- Ramiro Torres as Ignacio "Nacho" Fábregas Moreno
- Marijose Valverde as Pilar "Pili" Izaguirre Mendiola
- Fidel Zerda as Santos
- Víctor Luis Zúñiga as Juan "Juanito"

== Awards and nominations ==
Year	Award	Category	Nominee	Result
2003	21st TVyNovelas Awards	Best Telenovela	Angelli Nesma Medina	Nominated
2003	21st TVyNovelas Awards	Best Actress	Karyme Lozano	Nominated
2003	21st TVyNovelas Awards	Best Actor	Sergio Goyri	Nominated
2003	21st TVyNovelas Awards	Best Antagonist Actress	Mercedes Molto	Nominated
2003	21st TVyNovelas Awards	Best Antagonist Actor	Juan Pablo Gamboa	Nominated
2003	21st TVyNovelas Awards	Best Leading Actor	Eric del Castillo	Nominated
2003	21st TVyNovelas Awards	Best Supporting Actress	Eugenia Cauduro	Won
2003	21st TVyNovelas Awards	Best Supporting Actor	Otto Sirgo	Nominated
2003	21st TVyNovelas Awards	Best Female Revelation	Mayrin Villanueva	Won
2003	21st TVyNovelas Awards	Best Male Revelation	Jan	Nominated
2003	Palmas de Oro Awards	Best Telenovela	Angelli Nesma Medina	Won
2003	Palmas de Oro Awards	Best Musical Theme	"Niña amada mía" by Alejandro Fernández	Won
