= El Manantial =

Mexican telenovela

- Genre: Telenovela
- Created by: Cuauhtémoc Blanco; Víctor Manuel Medina
- Developed by: Ximena Suárez
- Screenplay by: María del Carmen Peña
- Directed by: Mónica Miguel; Adriana Barraza
- Starring: Adela Noriega; Daniela Romo; Mauricio Islas; Alejandro Tommasi
- Opening theme: "Amor, amor, amor" by Luis Miguel
- Composer: Jesús Blanco
- Country of origin: Mexico
- Original language: Spanish
- No. of episodes: 95

Production
- Executive producer: Carla Estrada
- Producer: Arturo Lorca
- Production locations: San Andrés Tuxtla, Veracruz; Mexico City; San Miguel de Allende, Guanajuato
- Cinematography: Alejandro Frutos; Alfredo Sánchez
- Editors: Juan Franco; Luis Horacio Valdés
- Camera setup: Multi-camera
- Production company: Televisa

Original release
- Network: Canal de las Estrellas
- Release: October 1, 2001 – February 8, 2002

Related
- La sombra del pasado

El Manantial (English: The Spring) is a Mexican telenovela produced by Carla Estrada for Televisa in 2001.

On Monday, October 1, 2001, Canal de las Estrellas started broadcasting El Manantial weekdays at 9:00pm, replacing Sin pecado concebido. The last episode was broadcast on Friday, February 8, 2002 with Entre el amor y el odio replacing it the following Monday.

The series stars Adela Noriega, Daniela Romo, Mauricio Islas and Alejandro Tommasi.

== Plot ==
In the town of San Andrés, the rivalry between two families —the Valdés and the Ramírez— finds its most obvious channel in "The Spring"

A spring of water that bathes the small Valdés property and not the neighboring ranch, the "Piedras Grandes" hacienda, where the wild cattle in the country are raised, which belongs to the Ramírez family.

However, the real reason for such an intense hatred is hidden in privacy. Justo Ramírez (Alejandro Tommasi), married to Margarita Insunza (Daniela Romo), maintains an adulterous relationship with Francisca Rivero (Azela Robinson), the wife of his rival and neighbor, Rigoberto Valdés (César Évora). This relationship, founded on deceit and promiscuity, will generate the bitterest resentment and will cause the gradual destruction of the two families.

The Valdés have a beautiful daughter named Alfonsina (Adela Noriega), who was born at the same time as Alejandro (Mauricio Islas), the Ramírez's only son and natural heir. Despite having been raised apart from each other and with their souls filled with prejudices against their respective families, they cannot help but feel attracted.

Alfonsina and Alejandro's first meeting is not exactly the best. Accustomed as they are to hating each other's last names, they are convinced of what they have always known: that the Valdés and the Ramírez can only be enemies.

The hatred of Alfonsina's family increases when Justo Ramírez, through a bad move, gets what he has always wanted: To own "The Spring". The loss of the property forces Alfonsina's family to leave San Andrés; hurt, she swears that she will do everything in her power to get back the land that belonged to her grandparents.

Thus, thinking that they have finally got rid of their eternal enemies, the Ramírez decide that the best candidate to be Alejandro's wife is Bárbara Luna (Karyme Lozano), a pretty but calculating and somewhat frivolous young girl. Bárbara's family, interested in the advantages that said link will bring them, is delighted with the idea and they formalize the engagement. This coincides with Alfonsina's return to San Andrés.

Bárbara mistrusts the newcomer and tries by all means to get her away from her future husband. However, the force of love is stronger than any intrigue and Alfonsina and Alejandro finally confess their love for each other.

But the resentment and ill will that has marked the relationship between their families condemns them to be victims of bitterness. To survive, their love will have to overcome the barriers that fate presents them and thus turn "The Spring" into a true source of hope.

== Cast ==
=== Main cast ===
- Adela Noriega as Alfonsina
- Daniela Romo as Margarita
- Mauricio Islas as Alejandro
- Alejandro Tommasi as Justo

=== Supporting cast ===
- Manuel Ojeda as Father Salvador
- Sylvia Pasquel as Pilar
- Patricia Navidad as Malena
- Olivia Bucio as Gertrudis
- Angelina Peláez as Altagracia
- Raymundo Capetillo as Álvaro
- Socorro Bonilla as Norma
- Sergio Reynoso as Fermín
- Justo Martínez as Melesio
- Rafael Mercadante as Gilberto
- Gilberto de Anda as Joel
- Lorena Enríquez as Maru
- Julio Monterde as Father Juan
- Alejandro Aragón as Hugo
- Luis Couturier as Carlos
- Leonor Bonilla as Mirna
- Socorro Avelar as Cata
- Ricardo de Pascual as Bishop
- Teo Tapia as Doctor
- Jorge Poza as Héctor
- Karyme Lozano as Bárbara

=== Guest stars ===
- César Évora as Rigoberto
- Azela Robinson as Francisca
- Nuria Bages as Eloísa
- Marga López as Chief Nun

== Awards and nominations ==
Year	Award	Category	Nominee(s)	Result
2002	TVyNovelas Awards	Best Telenovela	Carla Estrada	Won
2002	TVyNovelas Awards	Best Actress	Adela Noriega	Won
2002	TVyNovelas Awards	Best Actor	Mauricio Islas	Won
2002	TVyNovelas Awards	Best Antagonist Actress	Karyme Lozano	Nominated
2002	TVyNovelas Awards	Best Antagonist Actor	Alejandro Tommasi	Won
2002	TVyNovelas Awards	Best Leading Actress	Daniela Romo	Won
2002	TVyNovelas Awards	Best Leading Actor	Manuel Ojeda	Nominated
2002	TVyNovelas Awards	Best Co-lead Actress	Patricia Navidad	Won
2002	TVyNovelas Awards	Best Co-lead Actor	Jorge Poza	Won
2002	TVyNovelas Awards	Best Supporting Actress	Sylvia Pasquel	Nominated
2002	TVyNovelas Awards	Best Supporting Actor	Raymundo Capetillo	Nominated
2002	TVyNovelas Awards	"Silvia Derbez" Award	Olivia Bucio	Won
2002	TVyNovelas Awards	Best Original Story or Adaptation	Cuauhtémoc Blanco; Víctor Manuel Medina; María del Carmen Peña	Won
2002	TVyNovelas Awards	Best Direction	Mónica Miguel	Won
2002	Bravo Awards	Best Telenovela	Carla Estrada	Won
2002	Bravo Awards	Best Actress	Adela Noriega	Won
2002	Bravo Awards	Best Actor	Mauricio Islas	Won
2002	Bravo Awards	Best Antagonist Actress	Daniela Romo	Won
2002	Bravo Awards	Best Antagonist Actor	Alejandro Tommasi	Won
2002	Bravo Awards	Best Screenplay	Cuauhtémoc Blanco; Víctor Manuel Medina; María del Carmen Peña	Won
2002	El Heraldo de México Awards	Best Telenovela	Carla Estrada	Won
2002	El Heraldo de México Awards	Best Actress	Daniela Romo	Won
2002	El Heraldo de México Awards	Best Actor	Alejandro Tommasi	Won
2002	El Heraldo de México Awards	Best Actor	Mauricio Islas	Nominated
2002	El Heraldo de México Awards	Male Revelation	Rafael Mercadante	Nominated
2002	El Heraldo de México Awards	Best Direction	Mónica Miguel	Won
2003	INTE Awards	Production of the Year	Carla Estrada	Nominated
2003	INTE Awards	Actress of the Year	Adela Noriega	Nominated
2003	INTE Awards	Supporting Actress of the Year	Daniela Romo	Won
2003	INTE Awards	Supporting Actor of the Year	Alejandro Tommasi	Nominated
2003	INTE Awards	Director of the Year	Mónica Miguel	Nominated
2003	INTE Awards	Screenwriter of the Year	Cuauhtémoc Blanco	Nominated
2003	INTE Awards	Telenovela Musical Theme of the Year	"Amor, amor, amor" by Luis Miguel	Won
2004	Latin ACE Awards	Best Telenovela	El manantial	Won
2004	Latin ACE Awards	Best Direction	Mónica Miguel	Won
