= Mercedes Moltó =

Spanish-born Mexican actress (born 1974)

Mercedes Molto
- Born: Mercedes Moltó Contreras; 21 February 1974 (age 52); Barcelona, Catalonia, Spain
- Occupation: Actress
- Years active: 1993-present
- Spouse: Noel Salgado (2007-2013; divorced)
- Parent(s): Dr. José Moltó Ordoñez; Mercedes Contreras

Mercedes Moltó Contreras (born 21 February 1974, in Barcelona, Spain), known as Mercedes Molto, is a Spanish-born Mexican actress.

== Biography ==
Moltó was born 21 February 1971, in Barcelona, Spain. She is the daughter of Panamanian otorhinolaryngology medical surgeon Dr. José Moltó Ordoñez and Mercedes Contreras. She completed her primary and secondary studies in Panama, former student of officially CIDMI since she graduated from the International College of Mary Immaculate, located in La Alameda, Panama, is one of the best schools in Panama and there are still teachers who remember her fondly. She studied at CEA Televisa and has participated in a number of telenovelas of that company. At the age of sixteen, she arrived in Mexico, where she began her acting career.

On 15 September 2007, she married surgeon Noel Salgado. In 2013 after 6 years of marriage, they announced they were getting divorced. She currently lives in Miami.

== Filmography ==
Year	Title	Role	Notes
1993-94	Valentina	Luisita Basurto	Supporting role
1995	Caminos cruzados	Jackie	Supporting role
1995-96	Pobre Niña Rica	Bárbara de Villagrán	Supporting role
1996-97	Mi querida Isabel	Eugenia	Antagonist
1997-98	Sin ti	Brenda	Supporting role
1998	Rencor apasionado	Martha Valdivia	Special appearance
1998	Gotita de amor	Lucrecia Samaniego de Sotomayor	Main antagonist
2000-01	Por Un Beso	Mirna Ballesteros Mendizábal	Main antagonist
2001	Mujer, casos de la vida real		TV series
2002	La Otra	Eugenia Guillén Sáenz	Special appearance
2003	Niña Amada Mía	Karina Sánchez de Soriano	Main antagonist
2004	Big Brother VIP 3	Herself	Reality Show-Finished 3rd Place
2005	Pablo y Andrea	Carlota/Úrsula/Bárbara/Socorro Barraza	Main antagonist
2008	La rosa de Guadalupe	Rebeca	TV series
2008	Mujeres Asesinas	Silvia	Episode: "Martha, Asfixiante"
2011	Como dice el dicho		Episode: "No hay mal..."
2012	Relaciones peligrosas	Benita "Jefa" Mendoza	Co-protagonist
2013	Pasión prohibida	Deniz Lefevre "Mademoiselle"	Co-protagonist
2015	Bajo el mismo cielo	Deborah Sanders	Antagonist

== Awards and nominations ==
=== Premios TVyNovelas ===
Year	Category	Telenovela	Result
1998	Best Young Lead Actress	Mi querida Isabel	Nominated
2003	Best Female Antagonist	Niña Amada Mía	Nominated
