= Luz Elena González (actress) =

Mexican actress and model (born 1974)

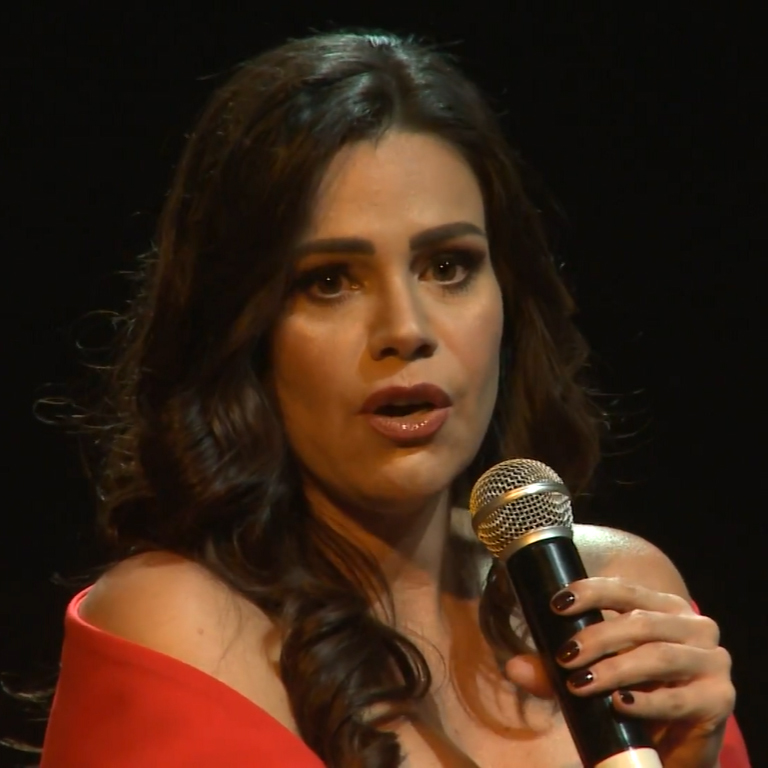
- Born: Luz Elena González de la Torre; August 22, 1974 (age 51); Guadalajara, Jalisco, Mexico
- Occupations: Actress; model
- Years active: 1992-present
- Spouse: Bernardo Martínez (m. 2009)
- Children: 2
- Relatives: Susana González (cousin)
- Awards: Nuestra Belleza Jalisco 1994 (Winner); Nuestra Belleza México 1994 (5th place)

Luz Elena González de la Torre (Spanish pronunciation: [lus eˈlena ɣonˈsales]; born August 22, 1974, in Guadalajara, Jalisco, Jalisco) is a Mexican actress and model.

In 1994 she won the beauty contest Nuestra Belleza Jalisco 1994 and participated in the national beauty contest Nuestra Belleza México 1994, finishing in fifth place.

== Professional life ==
González's professional acting career began in 1996 with the telenovela Mi querida Isabel. In 1997, she co-hosted with Jorge Ortiz de Pinedo the night variety entertainment program Al ritmo de la noche. She starred as the antagonist in Emilio Larrosa's telenovela Libre para amarte.

== Personal life ==
In 2009, she married Bernardo Martínez. They have a son, Santiago, and a daughter, María José.

== Filmography ==
Television roles
Year	Title	Roles	Notes
1992-93	Siempre en domingo	Presenter/Herself	
1996-97	Mi querida Isabel	Secretary	Recurring role
1997	Al ritmo de la noche	Presenter/Herself	
1998	Preciosa	Milagros Ortiz	Recurring Role
1998-99	Cero en conducta	Rosa Celeste/Rosa Davalos Montes	
1999	El Niño que vino del mar	Jacinta	Recurring Role
2000	Siempre te amaré	Mara	Recurring role
2000-01	Por un beso	Rita Jiménez de Ornelas	Recurring role
2001	Mujer, casos de la vida real		2 Episodes
2001	Charmed	Nurse	1 Episode
2002	Gran carnal	Jenny Corcuera	
2002	Entre el amor y el odio	Fuensanta de Moreno	Recurring role
2003	Alegrijes y rebujos	Irina Calleja	Recurring role
2003-04	La Escuelita VIP	Lucecita González	
2006	Al medio día		
2008	Querida enemiga	Diana Ruiz de Palma	Series regular
2009–2010	Hasta que el dinero nos separe	Victoria "Vicky" de la Parra "La Pajarita"	Series regular
2011–2012	Una familia con suerte	Graciela "Chela" Torres de Rinaldi	Main role
2013	Libre para amarte	Romina Montenegro	Series regular
2013-14	Estrella2	Herself	1 Episode
2014-2015	Mi corazón es tuyo	Magda	Recurring role
2015–2016	Antes muerta que Lichita	Jesusa "Chuchette" Urieta	Series regular
2017	Enamorándome de Ramón	Roxana	Series regular
2017–2018	Sin tu mirada	Susana Balmaceda	Main cast
2019	Julia vs. Julia	Herself	Episode: La reina de los realities
2020	Te doy la vida	Paulina Reyes	Recurring role
2021	Mi fortuna es amarte	Soledad "Chole" Pascual Gama	

Film roles
Year	Title	Roles	Notes
2003	El Cara de chango	Sonia Montano	
2003	Doble secuestro	Valeria Montemayor	
2005	El Cara de chango 2	Sonia Montano	

== Awards and nominations ==
=== Premios TVyNovelas ===
Year	Category	Telenovela	Result
2016	Best Supporting Actress	Antes muerta que Lichita	Nominated
2018	Best Antagonist Actress	Enamorándome de Ramón	Nominated

=== Premios People en Español ===
Year	Category	Telenovela	Result
2010	Revelation of the Year	Hasta que el dinero nos separe	Nominated
2012	Best Actress	Una familia con suerte	Nominated

Awards and achievements
Preceded by -	Nuestra Belleza Jalisco; 1994	Succeeded by Tania Prado Laursen
