= Mayrín Villanueva =

Mexican actress (born 1970)

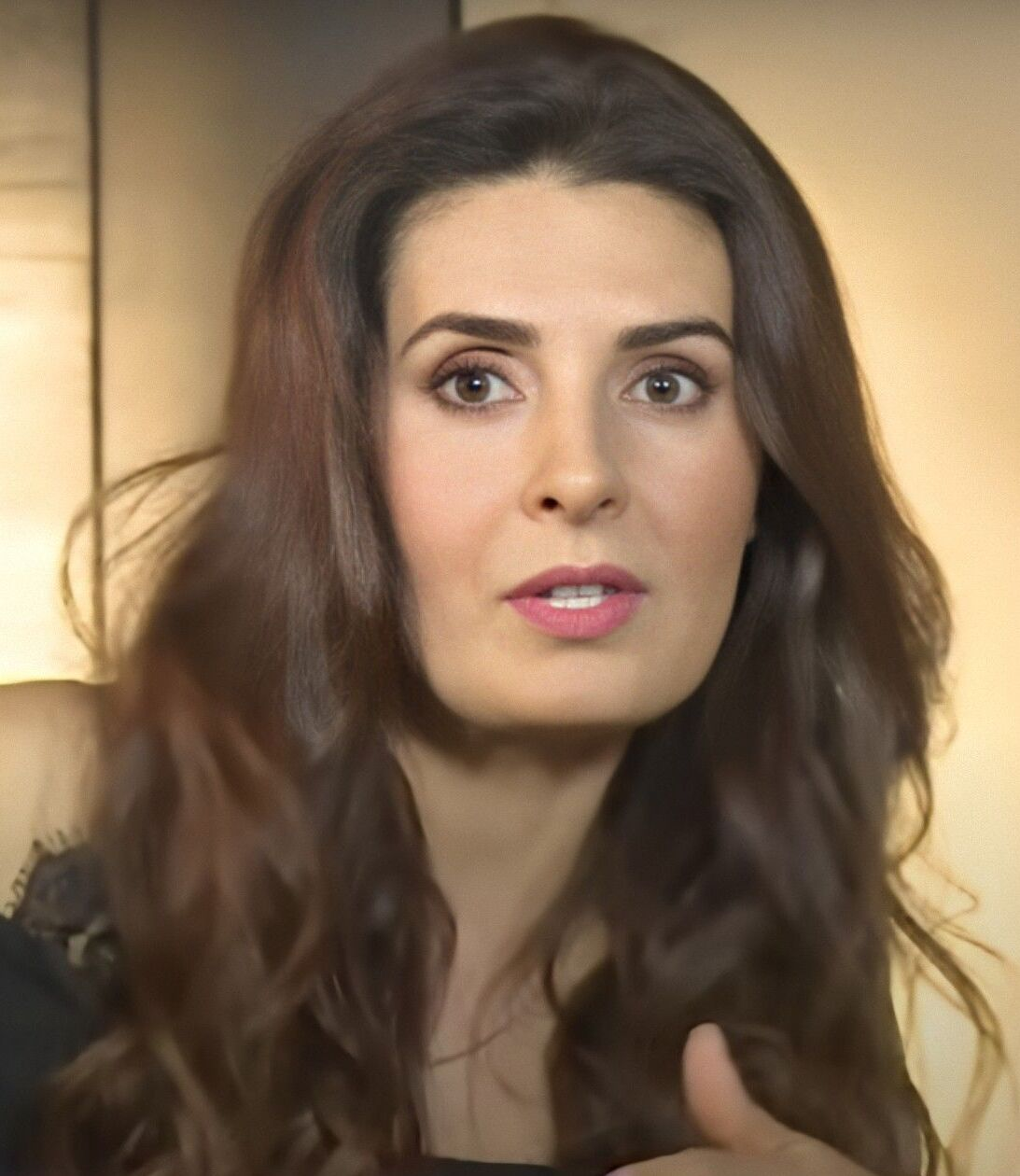
- Villanueva in 2019
- Born: Mayrín Villanueva Ulloa; 8 October 1970 (age 55); Toluca, State of Mexico, Mexico
- Occupations: Actress; model
- Years active: 1997–present
- Spouses: Jorge Poza (m. 1997; div. 2008) Eduardo Santamarina (m. 2009)
- Children: 3

Mayrín Villanueva Ulloa (born 8 October 1970) is a Mexican actress and model.

She starred as the protagonist of several telenovelas, including the 2013 telenovela Mentir para vivir.

== Filmography ==
Film roles
Year	Title	Role	Notes
2014	Prax: un niño especial	Herself	Short film

Television roles
Year	Title	Role	Notes
1998	Preciosa	Claudia Ortiz	
1998	La mentira	Nicole Belot	32 episodes
1999	Alma rebelde	Paula	
2000	Siempre te amaré	Berenice Castellanos Paragas	
2001	Amigas y rivales	Georgina Sánchez	
2003	Niña amada mía	Diana Soriano	
2004	Mujer de madera	Mariana Rodríguez	
2005–present	Vecinos	Silvia Olvera de San Román	Main role; 119 episodes
2006	La fea más bella	Jacqueline Palacios	Guest role
2007	Yo amo a Juan Querendón	Paula Dávila Escobar	Main role
2007	Amor sin maquillaje	Paula Dávila	25 episodes
2011–2012	Una familia con suerte	Rebeca Treviño	Main role; 266 episodes
2013	Mentir para Vivir	Oriana Caligaris	Main role; 102 episodes
2014–2015	Mi corazón es tuyo	Isabela Vázquez de Castro	Main role; 176 episodes
2016	Corazón que miente	Lucía Castellanos de Ferrer	Guest role; 7 episodes
2016	Mujeres de negro	Vanessa Leal Vda. de Zamora	Main role; 52 episodes
2017–2018	Me declaro culpable	Alba Castillo	Main role; 62 episodes
2018	Mi marido tiene familia	Rebeca Treviño	Guest role
2019–2020	Soltero con hijas	Gabriela García De del Paso	Main role
2020	Rubí	Refugio Ochoa de Perez	Guest role
2021–2022	Si nos dejan	Alicia Montiel de Carranza	Main role
2022	Vencer la ausencia	Esther Noriega	Main role
2023	¿Es neta, Eva?	Eva Cordero	Main role
2023	Golpe de suerte	Lupita Flores de Pérez	Main role
2025	Juegos de amor y poder	Inés Avendaño	
2026	Corazón de oro	Luz	Main role

== Awards and nominations ==
Year	Awards	Category	Nominee	Result
2003	TVyNovelas Awards	Best Female Revelation	Niña Amada Mía	Won
2007	TVyNovelas Awards	Best Comedic Performance	Vecinos	Nominated
2008	TVyNovelas Awards	Best Lead Actress	Yo Amo a Juan Querendón	Nominated
2012	TVyNovelas Awards	Best Lead Actress	Una familia con suerte	Nominated
2014	TVyNovelas Awards	Best Lead Actress	Mentir para vivir	Nominated
2015	TVyNovelas Awards	Best Female Antagonist	Mi corazón es tuyo	Nominated
2017	TVyNovelas Awards	Best Actress in Series	Mujeres de negro	Nominated

== Notes ==
In late 2007 it was reported by several newspapers that Mayrín Villanueva had landed the role of "Bond girl" in the 2008 James Bond film Quantum of Solace. A press release later issued by a representative of the official casting agency for the film, Ricardo Hernández, stated that Mayrín had not been cast.
