= Arleth Terán =

Mexican actress (born 1976)

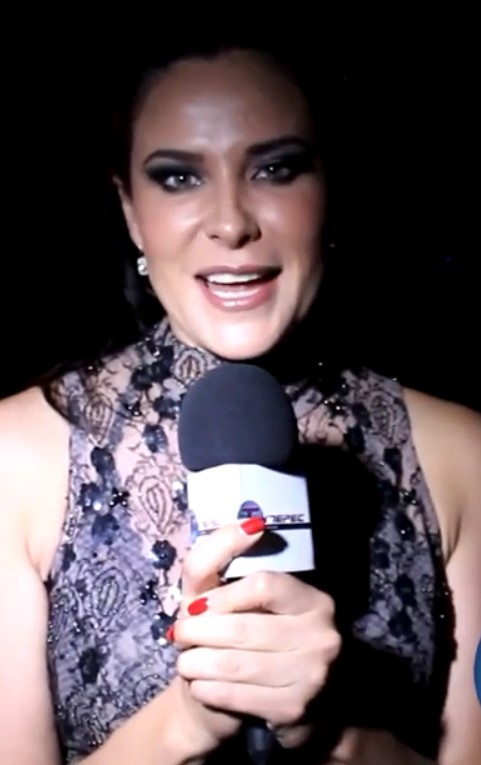
- Arleth Terán
- Born: Arleth Rocío Terán Sotelo; 3 December 1976 (age 49); Tamaulipas, Mexico
- Occupation: Actress
- Years active: 1994–present

Arleth Rocío Terán Sotelo (Spanish pronunciation: [aɾˈlet teˈɾan]; born 3 December 1976), known professionally as Arleth Terán, is a Mexican actress appearing on TV soap operas.

== Early life ==
Arleth studied acting at "Centro de Educacion Televisa" and went on to television. She debuted in small TV roles and then started appearing in soap operas.

One of her first roles was in the Tú y yo (1996) soap opera, where she appeared as a villain. She soon starred in more soaps such as Mi pequeña traviesa (1998), Tres mujeres (1999) and in the movie Amor Inesperado (2000).

== Career ==
Throughout her acting career, many of her roles have been of villains. This has earned her many awards for her villainous performances. She also appeared in the TV series La esposa virgen (2005).

== Filmography ==
=== Television ===
Year	Title	Role	Notes
2025	Doménica Montero	Fuensanta Ordaz de Acosta	Main cast
2025	Juegos de amor y poder	Bertha Rodríguez	Main cast
2022	Mujeres asesinas	Diana	Episode: "Bodas de plata"
2020	Esta historia me suena	Lorena	Episode: "Mientes tan bien"
2019	La reina soy yo	Ligia	Main cast
2018–2019	Las Buchonas	Débora	Main cast
2018	Sin miedo a la verdad	Mariana Maza	Episode: "Secuestro a periodista"
2015–2016	Simplemente María	Vanessa Rivapalacio de Arenti	Main cast
2014–2015	Hasta el fin del mundo	Regina Duarte	Recurring role
2013–2014	De que te quiero, te quiero	Cunchettina Capone de Ricci	Guest star
2013	Corazón indomable	Natasha Fuentes	Recurring role
2011–2015	Como dice el dicho	Various roles	4 episodes
2011	Rafaela	Ileana Contreras	Recurring role
2010	Zacatillo, un lugar en tu corazon	Hortensia "Tencha" de Carretas	Recurring role
2008–2009	Mañana es para siempre	Priscila Alvear de Elizalde	Main cast
2007–2008	Yo amo a Juan Querendón	Ivonne Mosquera Espejo	Main cast
2005	La esposa virgen	Olga Barquin	Main cast
2004	Corazones al límite	Emma Martínez	Main cast
2003	De pocas, pocas pulgas	Mireya Garníca	Recurring role
2000	Primer amor, a mil por hora	Priscila Luna Guerra	Main cast
1999	Alma Rebelde	Odette Fuentes Cano Rivera Hill	Recurring role
1999	Tres mujeres	Brenda Muñoz	Recurring role
1998	Mi pequeña traviesa	Déborah Quinto	Main cast
1996	Tu y Yo	Bárbara	Recurring role

=== Film ===
- Animales en peligro (2004)
- Secretarias privadisimas (2000)
- Milenio, el principio del fin (2000)
