= Tiempo final =

- Written by: Albatros, Carlos Esteban Orozco, Alejandro Borensztein, Sebastián Borensztein, Leonardo Garibello
- Directed by: Felipe Martínez Amador, Riccardo Gabrielli R, Juan Felipe Orozco, Carlos Moreno
- Country of origin: Colombia
- Original language: Spanish
- No. of seasons: 3
- No. of episodes: 54

Production
- Executive producer: Genoveva Rey
- Producers: Pedro Torres, Daniel García, Jorge Stamadianos, Samuel Duque Duque

Original release
- Network: Canal Fox
- Release: October 24, 2007 – November 11, 2009

Tiempo final is a Colombian television series produced by Fox Telecolombia for Canal Fox which aired from 2007 to 2009. It is an adaptation of the Argentine series of the same name, also written by Sebastián Borensztein and others, which aired from 2000 to 2002.

The series stars actors from a number of different countries, including Colombia, Mexico, Argentina, Peru and Venezuela.

== Plot ==
The stories in the series features apparently normal people who suddenly are exposed to extraordinary situations, and there are numerous plot twists.

== Series overview ==
| Season | Episodes | Originally released | |
| Season | Episodes | First released | Last released |
|---|---|---|---|
| 1 | 26 | October 24, 2007 | April 17, 2008 |
| 2 | 15 | September 4, 2008 | — |
| 3 | 13 | August 19, 2009 | November 11, 2009 |
