= 2024 Premios Juventud =

2024 award ceremony

21st Premios Juventud
- Date: July 25, 2024
- Location: José Miguel Agrelot Coliseum, San Juan, Puerto Rico
- Country: United States
- Hosted by: Lele Pons; Clarissa Molina; Wisin

Highlights
- Most nominations: Carin León, Maluma and Peso Pluma (7)
- Website: Official page

Television/radio coverage
- Network: Univision

The 21st Premios Juventud were held on July 25, 2024, recognizing the best in pop culture of young Hispanic and Latino Americans in 2024. The ceremony took place at the José Miguel Agrelot Coliseum in San Juan, Puerto Rico. It was broadcast on Univision, with Venezuelan-American content creator Lele Pons, Dominican actress and television presenter Clarissa Molina, and Puerto Rican rapper Wisin, serving as co-hosts.

== Nominations ==
The nominations were announced on June 25, 2024. Carin León, Maluma and Peso Pluma led the nominations with seven each, followed by Karol G and Shakira, both with six, and Becky G and Grupo Frontera, both with five.

The number of categories lowered significantly, from 44 to 31. While various categories for content creators were introduced, several general categories (namely Male Artist – On The Rise and Female Artist – On The Rise) as well as some genre categories (specifically urban and pop) were dropped.

== Performers ==
Artist(s)	Song(s)
Pre-show
Fariana; Oro Solido	"El Caballito"
Main show
Sergio George; Wisin	"La Vida Es Una Fiesta"
Anitta	"Fria" "Lose Ya Breath" "Cria de Favela"
Ela Taubert	"¿Cómo Pasó?"
Joss Favela	"Mis Compas"
Yovngchimi	"TU$$I"
Darell	"Lollipop"
Omar Courtz	"Luces De Colores"
Corina Smith	"X100"
Izaak	"BBY BOO"
Lunay; Luar La L	"No Te Quieren Conmigo"
Los Tigres del Norte	"Aquí Mando Yo"
Emilia	"La Playlist"
Camila	"Mía"
Natti Natasha	"Quiéreme Menos"
Los Esquivel	"Alucín" "Exceso"
Farruko	"Shofar" "Carbon Vrmor" "Rangos"
Reik	"No Molestar"
Darell; DJ Adoni; Prince Royce	"El Reemplazo"
Los Ángeles Azules; Emilia	"Perdonarte, ¿Para Qué?"
Anitta; Ivy Queen; La India; Luis Figueroa; Oscar D'León; Tito Puente Jr. Tony Succar	Tribute to Fania All-Stars "Oye Como Va" "Fever" "I Like It Like That" "Quimbara" "Aguanile" "Mi Gente"
Mau y Ricky	"Pasado Mañana"
Wisin; Darell; Lenny Tavárez	"Aventura 2.0"

== Winners and nominees ==
The nominations were announced on June 25, 2024. The winners are listed in bold.

=== General ===
Artist of the Youth – Male

- **Carin León**
- Bad Bunny
- Maluma
- Peso Pluma
- Sebastián Yatra

Artist of the Youth – Female

- **Karol G**
- Anitta
- Becky G
- María Becerra
- Shakira

Favorite Group or Duo of The Year

- **Fuerza Regida**
- Ha*Ash
- Los Ángeles Azules
- Mau y Ricky
- Reik

The New Generation – Female

- **Ela Taubert**
- J Noa
- Joaquina
- Rainao
- Zhamira Zambrano

The New Generation – Male

- **Luar La L**
- Christian Alicea
- Dei V
- Izaak
- Jere Klein
- Los Esquivel
- Luck Ra
- Milo J
- Omar Courtz
- Venesti

The Best Beatmakers

- **Bizarrap**
- Big One
- Chris Jedi
- Edgar Barrera
- Gaby Music
- MAG
- Ovy on the Drums
- Sky Rompiendo
- Tainy
- Zecca

The Perfect Mix

- **"Bellakeo" – Peso Pluma & Anitta**
- "ALV" – Arcángel & Grupo Frontera
- "Cosas de la Peda" – Prince Royce featuring Gabito Ballesteros
- "De Lunes a Lunes" – Manuel Turizo & Grupo Frontera
- "El Jefe" – Shakira & Fuerza Regida
- "En Esta Boca" – Kany García & Young Miko
- "Las Mujeres" – Carlos Vives & Juanes
- "Ni Me Debes Ni Te Debo" – Carin León & Camilo
- "Por el Contrario" – Becky G, Ángela Aguilar & Leonardo Aguilar
- "Según Quién" – Maluma & Carin León

OMG Collaboration

- **"Esta Vida" – Marshmello & Farruko**
- "Celular" – Nicky Jam, Maluma & The Chainsmokers
- "Contigo" – Karol G & Tiësto
- "Dientes" – J Balvin, Usher & DJ Khaled
- "Freak 54 (Freak Out)" – Pitbull & Nile Rodgers
- "K-Pop" – Travis Scott, Bad Bunny & The Weeknd
- "Muñekita" – Kali Uchis, El Alfa & JT
- "Niña Bonita" – Feid & Sean Paul
- "Puntería" – Shakira & Cardi B
- "Vocation" – Ozuna & David Guetta

Girl Power

- **"Labios Mordidos" – Kali Uchis & Karol G**
- "En Esta Boca" – Kany García & Young Miko
- "La Original.mp3" – Emilia & Tini
- "Nada de Ti" – Ana Bárbara & Majo Aguilar
- "Puntería" – Shakira & Cardi B

Favorite Dance Track

- **"Contigo" – Karol G & Tiësto**
- "Celular" – Nicky Jam, Maluma & The Chainsmokers
- "Dientes" – J Balvin, Usher & DJ Khaled
- "Esta Vida" – Marshmello & Farruko
- "La Original.mp3" – Emilia & Tini
- "Las Babys" – Aitana
- "Rauw Alejandro: Bzrp Music Sessions, Vol. 56" – Bizarrap & Rauw Alejandro
- "Vocation" – Ozuna & David Guetta

=== Urban ===
Best Urban Track

- **"Qlona" – Karol G & Peso Pluma**
- "Funk Rave" – Anitta
- "Lala" – Myke Towers
- "Monaco" – Bad Bunny
- "Niña Bonita" – Feid & Sean Paul
- "Un Cigarrillo" – Chencho Corleone

Best Urban Mix

- **"Quema" – Ryan Castro, Peso Pluma & SOG**
- "Bubalu" – Feid & Rema
- "Borracho y Loco" – Yandel & Myke Towers
- "Podemos Repetirlo" – Don Omar & Chencho Corleone
- "Tucu" – Ozuna & Amarion

Best Urban Album

- **Mañana Será Bonito (Bichota Season) – Karol G**
- Att. – Young Miko
- Cosmo – Ozuna
- Forever King – Don Omar
- LVEU: Vive La Tuya... No La Mía – Myke Towers
- Mor, No Le Temas a La Oscuridad – Feid
- Nadie Sabe Lo Que Va a Pasar Mañana – Bad Bunny
- Sol María – Eladio Carrión

=== Pop/Urban ===
Best Pop/Urban Song

- **"Bonita" – Daddy Yankee**
- "Coco Loco" – Maluma
- "Corazón Vacío" – María Becerra
- "No Te Enamores de Él" – Danny Ocean
- "Pasa_Je_Ro" – Farruko
- "Una Noche Sin Pensar" – Sebastián Yatra

Best Pop/Urban Collaboration

- **"Baby Hello" – Rauw Alejandro & Bizarrap**
- "Arranca" – Becky G featuring Omega
- "Copa Vacía" – Shakira & Manuel Turizo
- "Esta Vida" – Marshmello & Farruko
- "Manos Frías" – Mau y Ricky, Reik & Beéle
- "Vagabundo" – Sebastián Yatra, Manuel Turizo & Beéle

Best Pop/Urban Album

- **Las Mujeres Ya No Lloran – Shakira**
- .MP3 – Emilia
- Bailemos Otra Vez – Chayanne
- Don Juan – Maluma
- Sincerándome – Carlos Rivera

=== Regional Mexican ===
Best Regional Mexican Song

- **"La Diabla" – Xavi**
- "Como Quieras Quiero" – Eden Muñoz
- "Dios Bendiga Nuestro Amor" – Banda El Recodo de Cruz Lizárraga
- "Indispensable" – Carin León
- "No Es Que Me Quiera Ir" – Alejandro Fernández
- "No Se Vale" – Edwin Luna y La Trakalosa de Monterrey
- "Obsesión" – Intocable
- "Te Quiero Ver" – La Maquinaria Norteña
- "Un Cumbión Dolido" – Christian Nodal
- "Vengo de Verla" – Calibre 50

Best Regional Mexican Collaboration

- **"Lady Gaga" – Peso Pluma, Gabito Ballesteros & Junior H**
- "Alch Si" – Carin León & Grupo Frontera
- "CCC" – Michelle Maciel & Eden Muñoz
- "Cumbia Triste" – Los Ángeles Azules & Alejandro Fernández
- "Santo Patrón" – Banda MS de Sergio Lizárraga & Fuerza Regida

Best Regional Mexican Fusion

- **"Según Quién" – Maluma & Carin León**
- "De Lunes a Lunes" – Manuel Turizo & Grupo Frontera
- "El Amor de mi Vida" – Los Ángeles Azules & María Becerra
- "Peso Pluma: Bzrp Music Sessions, Vol. 55" – Peso Pluma & Bizarrap
- "Por el Contrario" – Becky G, Ángela Aguilar & Leonardo Aguilar

Best Regional Mexican Album

- **Génesis – Peso Pluma**
- Colmillo de Leche – Carin León
- Como en los Viejos Tiempos – Eden Muñoz
- El Comienzo – Grupo Frontera
- Esquinas – Becky G
- Exótico (Deluxe) – La Maquinaria Norteña
- Forajido EP2 – Christian Nodal
- Modus Operandi – Intocable
- Pa Las Baby's y Belikeada – Fuerza Regida
- Tiempo Al Tiempo – Calibre 50

New Generation – Regional Mexican

- **Xavi**
- Chino Pacas
- Delilah
- Gabito Ballesteros
- Jasiel Nuñez
- Michelle Maciel
- Nathan Galante
- Oscar Maydon

=== Tropical ===
Best Tropical Hit

- **"Bailando Bachata" – Chayanne**
- "Bandido" – Luis Figueroa
- "Mambo 23" – Juan Luis Guerra 4.40
- "Me EnRD" – Prince Royce
- "Punta Cana" – Marc Anthony

Best Tropical Mix

- **"Plis" – Camilo & Evaluna Montaner**
- "El Yate (Versión Salsa)" – Lenny Tavárez & Sergio George
- "Las Mujeres" – Carlos Vives & Juanes
- "No Es Normal" – Venesti, Nacho & Maffio
- "Si Tú Me Quieres" – Fonseca & Juan Luis Guerra 4.40

Best Tropical Album

- **Llamada Perdida – Prince Royce**
- Clásicos de la Provincia 30 Años (Remastered & Expanded) – Carlos Vives
- Radio Güira – Juan Luis Guerra 4.40
- Voy a Ti – Luis Figueroa
- Yo – Christian Alicea

=== Digital ===
Creator of the Year

- **Wendy Guevara**
- Basi Cerdan
- Dani Valle
- Tammy Parra
- Yeri Mua

Inspiring Creator

- **Carlos Eduardo Espina**
- Daniel Habif
- Nilda Chiaraviglio
- Sofía Bella
- Vanesa Amaro

Creator with a Cause

- **Juan González**
- Alexis Omman
- Jake Ceja
- Juixxe
- Manuel Nuñez

LOL Creator

- **Karla De La Torre**
- Andres Johnson
- Jezzini
- La Jose
- Mr. Chuy

=== Television ===
My Favorite Actor

- **Daniel Elbittar – El amor no tiene receta**
- Emmanuel Palomares – Perdona nuestros pecados
- Gabriel Soto – Vencer la culpa
- Marcus Ornellas – Eternamente amándonos
- Matías Novoa – Cabo

My Favorite Actress

- **Bárbara de Regil – Cabo**
- Carolina Miranda – Tierra de esperanza
- Claudia Martín – El amor no tiene receta
- Coco Máxima – El amor no tiene receta
- Livia Brito – Minas de pasión

They Make Me Fall In Love

- **Angelique Boyer & Daniel Elbittar – El amor invencible**
- Carolina Miranda & Andrés Palacios – Tierra de esperanza
- Claudia Martin & Daniel Elbittar – El amor no tiene receta
- Livia Brito & Osvaldo de León – Minas de pasión
- Marcus Ornellas & Alejandra Robles Gil – Eternamente amándonos

=== Special recognitions ===
- Agente de Cambio – Anitta
