= El amor no tiene receta =

- Genre: Telenovela
- Created by: Pablo Ferrer García-Travesí; Santiago Pineda Aliseda
- Directed by: Eric Morales; Bonnie Cartas; Carlos Alcázar
- Starring: Claudia Martín; Daniel Elbittar; Altair Jarabo; Azela Robinson
- Theme music composer: Luis Gómez Escolar; Robert Ramírez
- Opening theme: "Sí o sí" by Emilio Osorio
- Composers: J. Eduardo Murguía; Mauricio L. Arriaga
- Country of origin: Mexico
- Original language: Spanish
- No. of seasons: 1
- No. of episodes: 95

Production
- Executive producer: Juan Osorio
- Producer: Ignacio Ortíz Castillo
- Editors: Norma Ramírez Ortiz; Fernando Rodríguez; Pablo Peralta
- Camera setup: Multi-camera
- Production company: TelevisaUnivision

Original release
- Network: Las Estrellas
- Release: 19 February – 28 June 2024

El amor no tiene receta (English: Love Has No Recipe) is a Mexican telenovela produced by Juan Osorio for TelevisaUnivision. The series stars Claudia Martín and Daniel Elbittar. It aired on Las Estrellas from 19 February 2024 to 28 June 2024.

== Plot ==
Paz Roble is a kind and hardworking woman whose husband, Fermín, takes her newborn daughter away from her. Fermín has a debt with moneylenders and to pay it he decides to sell his daughter to Mauro Nicoliti. This plan is orchestrated by Ginebra, Mauro's adoptive sister. Ginebra lost her daughter in childbirth and does everything to replace her and keep her husband's fortune. Esteban Villa de Cortés, on the other hand, loses his wife and is left a widower with his three children. Elvira Moncada, Esteban's mother-in-law, holds him responsible for the death of her daughter, which causes them to fall out.

Six years later, Paz has maintained a constant search in the hope of finding her daughter. Her family runs a restaurant called Corazón Contento. Samara, the supposed daughter of Ginebra, is loved by her father Elías but mistreated by Ginebra. Ginebra sets out on a trip with her family to get rid of Elías and Sam. Sam is left for dead, while Ginebra moves on to a new plan: make Esteban fall in love with her and, in the process, exercise a personal vendetta against Elvira, whom she blames for all her tragedies.

Esteban and Paz meet in the neighborhood where she lives with her family and they gradually recognize that they have suffered. Due to acts of negligence and revenge, Paz's restaurant is closed, but Esteban offers her the opportunity to help him as a cook in his home. Fate manages to put Sam in Paz's life, and a mother-daughter connection is born between them. The romance between Esteban and Paz is complicated by a number of challenges including their families, their own emotions, and the opposition of Ginebra and Elvira.

== Cast ==
=== Main ===
- Claudia Martín as Paz Roble Ruiz
- Daniel Elbittar as Esteban Villa de Cortés
- Altair Jarabo as Ginebra Nicoliti
- Azela Robinson as Elvira Moncada
- Beatriz Moreno as Guadalupe Ruiz
- Jesús Moré as Humberto
- Juan Carlos Barreto as Porfirio Villa de Cortés
- Isabella Tena as Gala
  - Abril Tayabas as Child Gala
- Luz Ramos as Mireya Roble Ruiz
- Tiago Correa as Mauro Nicoliti
- Mía Fabri as Samara "Sam" Barral Nicoliti / Luna
- Nicola Porcella as Kenzo Figueroa
- Hugo Catalán as Fermín
- Raúl Coronado as Fobo Arredondo
- Liz Gallardo as Filipa Guerra Alvarado
- Ignacio Ortíz as Castro
- Sofía Olea as Mónica
- Coco Máxima as Nandy Galdeano
- Mauricio Pimentel as Rubio
- Fernanda Valenzuela as Karla
- Jai Maqueo as Bosco
  - Leo Herrera as Child Bosco
- Regina Villaverde as Gema
- Emilio Caballero as Salomón Roble
- Santiago Emiliano as Pedro Pablo "Pepa" Roble
- Andrés Vázquez as Jerónimo Figueroa
- Asbel Ramses as Gorila
- Antonia Mayer as Giovanna
- Sebastián Guevara as Eder
  - Alexander Elbittar as Toddler Eder
- Héctor Salas as Sandro
- Mariano Soria as Monito

=== Recurring and guest stars ===
- Sabrina Seara as Berenice Moncada
- Harry Geithner as Elías Barral
- Nino Torres as Tortuga
- Moisés Zurman as Abdul
- Sergio Lozano as Savón
- Guillermo García Cantú as Ramsés Torrenegro

== Production ==
=== Development ===
The telenovela was first announced in August 2023. Filming began on 14 November 2023 and concluded on 18 May 2024.

=== Casting ===
In August 2023, Wendy Guevara and Nicola Porcella were confirmed as part of the cast. On 20 September 2023, Claudia Martín and Daniel Elbittar were announced in the lead roles, with Azela Robinson, Altair Jarabo and Beatriz Moreno being confirmed as part of the cast as well. On 2 October 2023, Isabella Tena and Andrés Vázquez joined the cast. On 17 October 2023, Coco Máxima was cast to replace Wendy Guevara. Guevara was unable to join the series due to other commitments.

== Ratings ==
Viewership and ratings per season of El amor no tiene receta
| Season | Timeslot (CT) | Episodes | First aired | | Last aired | | Avg. viewers (millions) |
| Season | Timeslot (CT) | Episodes | Date | Viewers (millions) | Date | Viewers (millions) | Avg. viewers (millions) |
|---|---|---|---|---|---|---|---|
| 1 | Mon–Fri 8:30 p.m. | 89 | 19 February 2024 | N/A | 28 June 2024 | 3.18 | 2.87 |

== Episodes ==
| No. | Title | Original release date | Mexico viewers (millions) |
|---|---|---|---|
| 1 | "Su hija está desaparecida" | 19 February 2024 (Note: Premiered early online through Las Estrellas website on 16 February 2024.) | N/A |
Fermín assaults Paz after she complains about his irresponsibility because he lives in debt. Ginebra decides to erase all evidence that her daughter was born lifeless, so she asks Mauro to find a way to bring her a newborn baby. Esteban asks for help to have his wife resuscitated, the doctor informs him that Berenice is dead. To get out of debt, Fermín accepts Mauro's proposal and makes Paz believe that their daughter was abducted.
| 2 | "Algún día tú y yo vamos a sanar" | 20 February 2024 | N/A |
Six years after the disappearance of her newborn baby, Paz asks Fermín to tell her the truth about what happened to her baby. In the middle of a street fight, Paz helps Esteban and the two are delighted to meet. Ginebra uses artificial intelligence to make Elvira's hatred for Esteban grow. Ginebra wants to get rid of her daughter and husband to fulfill her plans.
| 3 | "Conocí a una mujer muy interesante" | 21 February 2024 | N/A |
Ginebra is tired of taking care of Samara so she takes advantage of any moment to make offensive comments to her, but is caught by Elias. Esteban assures Elvira that he will not tolerate her insults, she swears that she will make him pay for what he did to Berenice. Before killing Elias, Ginebra confesses to him that Samara does not carry his blood since his real daughter died at birth. Paz accepts the job Esteban proposed to her, he visits her at her house to tell her about her responsibilities, but Fermín finds them together.
| 4 | "A partir de ahora ya no soy la esclava de Elias" | 22 February 2024 | N/A |
Fermín returns to Paz's life ready to win her back and steals a kiss in front of Esteban, but Paz slaps him. Samara is rescued by some villagers, they take her to a church where they swear she will receive help, but Cobija, her dog, escapes and her situation becomes complicated. Gala does not want to gain weight and to maintain her figure, she stops eating.
| 5 | "Me identifico con usted porque estoy pasando por el mismo dolor" | 23 February 2024 | N/A |
Esteban reveals to Paz that he is afraid that Elvira will take his children away from him, so she suggests a plan to stop that from happening. Gorila forces Samara to steal so that she can have food now that she lives on the street. Ginebra reveals to Mauro that she only feels hatred for Elvira, since she does not believe in her suffering. Samara starts begging for money on a bridge and crosses paths with Paz, who is impressed to meet her.
| 6 | "¿Qué su alma no estaba rota desde antes?" | 26 February 2024 | 2.97 |
Elvira shows Gala the video where Berenice admits that Esteban cheated on her, since he was only with her for her money. Elvira finds another video of Berenice where she declares that her mother only became a burden in her life. Paz arrives at Ginebra's house to inform her that she saw her daughter asking for money, Ginebra confronts Mauro for lying to her. Paz visits Esteban in jail and informs him that his children believe in his innocence.
| 7 | "Berenice, ahora voy por tu marido" | 27 February 2024 | 2.93 |
Esteban is released from jail, Paz congratulates him and he does not hesitate to hug her. Nandy confesses to Mireya that she feels very grateful for the support that the family gave her when she was going through complicated times. Elvira recognizes in front of her grandchildren that Esteban is innocent and assures them that someone is causing them a lot of harm. Ginebra starts working in Elvira's company and when she sees Berenice's photo she swears that she is going to stay with Esteban.
| 8 | "¿Paz Roble es la mamá de tu hija?" | 28 February 2024 | 2.81 |
After what happened with Ginebra, Esteban tells her that she cannot work in his company without first getting help from a professional. Ginebra confesses to Mauro that Esteban was worried about her, he begs her not to spoil the plans. Elvira breaks down in tears as she reveals that before Berenice, she had a daughter of whom she knows nothing about. Ginebra describes Elvira the worst mother in the world. Fermín demands that Rubio no longer go near Paz Roble, Ginebra is surprised to hear Paz's name and questions him if this woman is the mother of his daughter.
| 9 | "Tú podrías ser mi hija" | 29 February 2024 | 2.71 |
Paz makes it clear to Elvira that just because she is an employee, she will not allow her to disrespect her, and in revenge Elvira throws the food on the floor and asks her to leave the kitchen clean. Paz listens to Mauro's conversation where he gives orders of what to do to Sam now that he has her back. Elvira upon learning more details of Ginebra's life does not hesitate to remember the day her father snatched her newborn daughter from her arms. Elvira loses control when she has a few glasses of wine and assures Ginebra that she may be her daughter.
| 10 | "¿Has pensado en volver a casarte?" | 1 March 2024 | 2.82 |
After Jerónimo rejects Gala for not having the same interests, she kisses Salomón and asks him to be her boyfriend. Elvira makes Esteban believe that Paz put a substance in the cupcakes she prepared, he complains to her for wanting to harm his family and informs her that he will have all the food analyzed. Elvira thanks Ginebra for all her attentions and shares that it hurts her that she no longer has a daughter. Ginebra questions Esteban about the possibility of rebuilding his life, he assures her that Berenice is his only and greatest love.
| 11 | "Estoy dispuesta a amarla como a mi hija" | 4 March 2024 | 2.90 |
Fermín contacts Paz to give her the address of where Sam is and asks her to be very careful. Monito saves Luna and asks her to find Cobija as well as a doctor to help him with his injury. Paz, holding Sam in her arms, asks her to trust her because she is not going to let anything bad happen to her. Mauro gives up when he can't find Sam. Paz takes Luna home and assures her family that she is willing to take care of her and love her as if she were her own daughter.
| 12 | "Paz necesita un abrazo" | 5 March 2024 | 2.80 |
Paz has a special moment with Luna, who shares with her that she wishes she was her mother. Pedro Pablo reveals to Esteban that Bosco tried to hurt him the day of the party at his house, Bosco assures that he only wanted to take care of the house's belongings. Ginebra records another video using artificial intelligence to impersonate Berenice and thus take down Esteban and Elvira. Esteban questions Paz about the reason why she left her job, he gives her confidence so that she can unburden herself.
| 13 | "¿Quieres que lo enamore?" | 6 March 2024 | 2.91 |
Paz accepts the money offered by Fermín and confesses that she rescued Luna, he asks to meet her. During Esteban's press conference, a video of Berenice is broadcast where she accuses him of wanting to wipe out her family to keep all her fortune. Elvira invites Ginebra to lunch and takes the opportunity to take a saliva sample to confirm if she is her daughter. Paz proposes to Mireya to win Mauro's heart so she can find out what plans he has against Sam. Luna dreams that her friend Monito is in danger, so she decides to leave Paz's house to rescue him.
| 14 | "Acepto tu propuesta de trabajo" | 7 March 2024 | 2.94 |
Elvira warns Esteban that she will not accept that a servant becomes the stepmother of her grandchildren, he assures her that he will always defend Paz. While singing the song Paz wrote to her daughter, Luna manages to remember her mother's face. Esteban gets upset with Ginebra after she steals a kiss from him, she assures him that she never imagined she would hurt his feelings. Ginebra manages to convince Esteban to be her ally to find the person who is trying to harm his integrity.
| 15 | "Ginebra, aquí nadie te hará daño" | 8 March 2024 | 2.77 |
Esteban confronts Elvira and assures her that if Salomón has good intentions with Gala, he is willing to support their relationship. Elvira receives a call asking her for five million pesos; if she refuses, society will find out that she had a daughter before Berenice. Fermín surprises Luna with some gifts and assures Lupita that she could have been his daughter. Some hooded men enter Ginebra's house to steal everything, Esteban protects her from the thieves.
| 16 | "Yo soy una mujer trans" | 11 March 2024 | 2.87 |
Paz does not allow any more humiliation from Bosco and confronts him, he reveals to his siblings that Paz almost kissed Esteban. Mireya defends Salomón from Elvira's humiliations, she offers him a large sum of money to keep him out of Gala's life. Fobo gives Elvira the results of the DNA test and confirms that Ginebra is her daughter. Nandy opens her heart to Kenzo and confesses that she was born Fernando Galdeano, but decided to be a trans woman.
| 17 | "Yo también quiero volver a vivir, Paz" | 12 March 2024 | 3.03 |
Esteban goes to jail to meet the criminal who destroyed his family, Rubio accepts what he did to Berenice. Ginebra and Mauro celebrate that their plans against Elvira's family are working out just as they thought and are sure that no one will ever discover that they are behind Berenice's death. Esteban talks to Salomón about his relationship with Gala and demands that he respect her since his daughter is no trophy. Paz is nervous when Esteban takes her by the hand and confesses that she wants to live again, he agrees with her feelings.
| 18 | "Luna, es mi hija" | 13 March 2024 | 2.63 |
Ginebra imagines a romantic moment with Esteban, but knows better than to fall in love. Luna suffers an accident that puts Paz in a dilemma. Esteban confesses to Kenzo that it is not physical attraction that he feels for Paz, it is actually something deeper. Dr. Mónica Manzano identifies Luna as the girl who is being searched by Ginebra.
| 19 | "Estoy dispuesto a sacrificar todo por ti, Luna" | 14 March 2024 | 2.97 |
When Elvira learns that Nandy will work in her company, she fires her; Esteban and Kenzo come to her defense. Paz accepts in front of Dr. Mónica that she is not Luna's mother and assures her that she had to lie to protect herself and Luna. When Ginebra learns that Esteban will not rest until Rubio is thrown in jail, she advises him to forget about the case because it will harm him, but more so his children. Paz informs Luna that they must separate since she has to return to her mother's side, Fermín makes a plan to get Luna out of the hospital.
| 20 | "Desde que mi hija no está, mis días son eternos" | 15 March 2024 | 2.75 |
Fermín manages to get Luna out of the hospital without being caught by the authorities; Paz waits for him in the cab to take the child. Kenzo blames Filipa for his children hating him and warns her that he will fight for custody of them. After doing a live broadcast, Gala starts receiving messages about her weight, she questions her friend if she looks fat. Ginebra meets with the mothers who have missing children, she breaks down in tears as she confesses that she is sure her daughter is dead.
| 21 | "¿Puedo besarla?" | 18 March 2024 | 2.68 |
Esteban confesses to Lupita that he is beginning to fall in love with Paz, so he wants to talk to her to find out her feelings. Lupita is upset with Paz when she learns how Luna was taken from the hospital, Paz assures her that she will blame herself when the authorities find her whereabouts. Nandy can no longer hide her feelings and reveals to Kenzo that she is in love with him. Esteban confesses his feelings to Paz and kisses her.
| 22 | "Tan solo de escucharte me siento tranquila" | 19 March 2024 | 2.81 |
Paz is determined to face any obstacle that may arise now that she has agreed to be Esteban's girlfriend. Gala reveals to Esteban that Rubio not only hurt her mother, he also messed with Paz. Paz confirms that Rubio sent her to the hospital. Ginebra is willing to give Filipa all the money she needs in exchange for her help in her money laundering business. Fermín assures Paz that her daughter will soon be by her side, she reveals that she imagines that Luna is the daughter they lost.
| 23 | "Humberto me robó el cariño de mi padre" | 20 March 2024 | 3.01 |
Esteban is eager to kiss Paz, but she asks him to be discreet; Elvira surprises them in the kitchen. Lupita complains to Mireya for going to a hotel with Mauro; Mireya reveals that she is willing to help her sister Paz. Esteban arrives at the house where he grew up to be reunited with his father, Porfirio, who upon seeing Esteban, is filled with hatred and asks him to leave. Filipa forbids Nandy to enter the women's restroom, Kenzo comes to her defense and proposes to Elvira to conduct an inclusion course for all the company's employees.
| 24 | "¿Qué haces aquí Mireya?" | 21 March 2024 | N/A |
Ginebra arrives at Esteban's house to give Gala, Bosco and Eder some gifts, they are impressed with the gestures. Gala gets upset with Elvira when she sees the way she refers to Paz and asks her to respect her. Elvira is upset with Esteban for leaving the company without telling her and asks Paz for an explanation for leaving with him. Mireya informs Paz that the investigation is getting complicated, Paz asks her sister to get to safety, but is discovered by Mauro.
| 25 | "No voy a fastidiar a Paz, la voy a eliminar" | 22 March 2024 | 2.93 |
Ginebra overhears Paz's conversation and questions her if the girl they found is her daughter. Gema thanks her aunt for all the support she is giving her to keep Salomón's family business closed, Lupita begs her for a little compassion. Ginebra confesses to Mauro that she will never forgive Berenice for growing up surrounded by luxury and with a family, while she suffered on the streets. When she confirms that Paz is having an affair with Esteban, Ginebra warns Filipa that she plans to finish off her new enemy.
| 26 | "¡Te quiero Paz!" | 25 March 2024 | 2.66 |
Paz asks her family to hide Luna, who remembers that her mother's name is Ginebra and wants to be reunited with her. Paz makes up a story so that Ginebra cannot enter her house, Ginebra suspects that she is hiding something from her and begs her to help her put up posters of her daughter around the neighborhood. Paz denies having a relationship with Esteban, but Ginebra asks her to speak the truth because sooner or later things will come out. Ginebra confesses to Mauro that she has no mercy to get Paz out of her way, since she had no remorse when it came to her sister Berenice.
| 27 | "¿Samara esta viva?" | 26 March 2024 | 2.68 |
Ginebra goes to the neighborhood party and meets Sam alone; despite wearing a mask, she seems strangely familiar to her. Sam discusses with Paz her desire to question Ginebra to find out how she ended up living on the street. Ginebra recalls her encounter with 'Chema' and realizes that it could have been Sam, deducing that Paz has her in hiding. Paz warns Esteban that she has seen strange attitudes in Gala that could indicate that she suffers from an eating disorder.
| 28 | "Si quieres puedo ser tu hija María" | 27 March 2024 | 2.97 |
Ginebra remembers when, as a child, she saved Mauro's life, he is grateful, but she warns him not to betray her. Paz confesses to Lupita that it is in her hands to make Luna's wish come true, so she is determined to return her to Ginebra. Mireya tries to convince Paz not to return Luna to Ginebra because she fears something bad might happen to her. Fermín is sorry for what he did in the past and takes advantage of the fact that he is with Luna to ask her forgiveness.
| 29 | "Luna va a seguir con nosotros" | 28 March 2024 | 2.56 |
Elvira is upset with Esteban when she learns that he started a relationship with Paz and warns him that she will not allow the cook to take Berenice's place. Ginebra confirms that the girl who escaped from the hospital is Sam, Mauro tries to reassure her that Fermín will investigate if Paz is involved. Bosco finds out about his father's relationship with Paz and calls him a hypocrite for hiding his relationship. Mónica reveals to Paz that Ginebra and Mauro put something in her drink to make her confess the truth and she is sure that Sam is in danger with them. Paz announces to her family that Luna will continue to live with them.
| 30 | "A Ginebra le soy leal" | 29 March 2024 | 2.45 |
Elvira threatens Esteban with firing him from the company if he refuses to remove Paz as cook from the house, he does not give in to her blackmail and is willing to leave with his children. Ginebra assures Elvira that Paz is a dangerous woman as she suspects she may be behind Sam's disappearance. Luna, upon hearing her real name, remembers the hard times she lived by Ginebra's side and reveals to Paz the extent of her mother's power. Mauro arrives at Paz's house ready to find Sam; however, Paz assures him that she has nothing to hide.
| 31 | "Paz y su familia van a vivir con nosotros" | 1 April 2024 | 2.80 |
Fobo tries to comfort Elvira with a hug, she asks him not to show her affection because she does not want to confuse him, especially now that she doesn't accept Esteban's relationship with Paz. Suspecting that Paz may have Samara, Ginebra threatens Fermín with harm to get him to reveal the truth; he manages to convince her that Paz does not have her daughter. Fermín does not want Paz to be happy with Esteban so he proposes to Ginebra to join forces to destroy them. Elvira is opposed to sharing her house with Paz's family, Esteban warns her that he will not allow them to leave, but Ginebra surprises them by offering them her home.
| 32 | "Tu presencia me está ayudando" | 2 April 2024 | 3.01 |
Esteban gets upset with Ginebra for taking Bosco to jail to confront Berenice's murderer, Elvira comes to her defense and asks him to respect her since she is part of the family. Ginebra causes Paz to break some fine glasses, Elvira does not hesitate to humiliate her and warns her that Esteban will end up leaving her. Ginebra dreams that she is having a romantic moment with Esteban, but he is clear that he only loves Paz. Nandy accepts that she is madly in love with Kenzo, he takes her hands and kisses her.
| 33 | "Huyamos juntos con nuestra hija" | 3 April 2024 | 2.68 |
Ginebra, with Mauro's help, manages to tap Paz's phone and after a call, she confirms that Sam is alive and is being held by her now enemy. Mauro warns Ginebra that if she files a report the only ones who will go to jail will be Nandy and Kenzo, she admits he is right and prepares a plan against Paz. When Fermín confirms that Paz and Sam are in danger, he proposes to run away with his daughter and thus form the family they had dreamed of. After the proposal to escape together, Paz assures Fermín that she will not separate from Esteban because she loves him.
| 34 | "Tu vida me pertenece" | 4 April 2024 | 2.65 |
Paz becomes suspicious of Ginebra's intentions and fear takes hold of her when she asks to see her. Ginebra asks for help to find her daughter and by means of hints she provokes Paz into fearing that she will be accused of taking her away. Humberto becomes present in Esteban's life and he is envious of his relationship with Porfirio. After inviting Esteban to stay for a few days, Humberto proposes that he prove he can manage the land and he will disappear forever. Ginebra has plans to expand her business and asks Fermín to bring Monito to her, he refuses because he is Samara's best friend and he could get into trouble with Paz.
| 35 | "Paz, ¿quieres ser mi novia?" | 5 April 2024 | 2.64 |
Fobo gets close to Elvira again, but she confesses to him that she has suffered a lot and that her heart is broken since Berenice's death. Esteban plans a romantic evening with Paz and in the middle of a romantic date he asks her to take the next step in their relationship. Faced with Gema's warnings, Salomón keeps his word and ends his fake relationship with Gala. When questioned about his decision, he lies about his feelings. Ginebra and Mauro fake a conversation about how much they miss Samara. Mireya overhears everything and doubts about Mauro's innocence.
| 36 | "Ahora eres mía y tú mío" | 8 April 2024 | 2.62 |
Ginebra admits to Paz that she is interested in Esteban and warns her that their happiness will not last long. Jerónimo confirms to Gala that Salomón doesn't love her since he cheated on her with Gema, Gala is disappointed and assures him that she prefers to be alone. Esteban surprises Paz with a dinner, he is romantic and they make love. Lupita warns Rubio not to hurt her daughters, he does not hesitate to threaten her with harming her family.
| 37 | "Te extraño mucho Paz" | 9 April 2024 | 2.82 |
Esteban asks Paz that there be no secrets between them and questions her about her sudden change of phone number and begs her to be honest so that he can defend her. Paz manages to rush Lupita to the hospital; the doctor assures her that her mother's life is in danger. Elvira cannot believe that Fobo is in love with her even though he knows her flaws. Luna bursts into tears when she learns that Lupita's life is in danger, so she begs Paz not to take her away from her.
| 38 | "Esteban me enamoré de ti" | 10 April 2024 | 2.86 |
Mauro hears that Mireya is starting to have feelings for him, so he plans to use this to his advantage. Lupita confesses to Paz that Rubio was the one who attacked her on Fermín's orders, she confronts him, but he denies everything. Paz confesses to Esteban that she is jealous of Ginebra because she revealed to her that she is interested in him, Esteban makes it clear that he has no feelings for her. Ginebra accepts in front of Esteban that she is in love with him and warns him that they have to wait to see what happens with his relationship with Paz.
| 39 | "¿Cómo pudiste traicionarme?" | 11 April 2024 | 3.03 |
Paz and her family are arrested, she reveals to Esteban that she was protecting Ginebra's daughter. Esteban reproaches Paz for her lies and assures her that he confronted his children and Elvira to defend their relationship, but in the end they were right. Ginebra manages to reunite with Sam and assures her in front of the police that she longed to hear her voice, since she spent many days crying for her absence. Paz, left alone in prison, is assaulted by the security personnel and is warned that she will pay dearly for what she did.
| 40 | "Aquí la única mala eres tú" | 12 April 2024 | 2.90 |
Esteban confronts Mauro when he learns of the plans he had against Sam. Ginebra makes it clear to Esteban that Paz and her family wanted to keep her daughter Sam and that is why they caused the accident so that she would forget her past. Esteban learns that the lawyer he appointed for Paz and her family's case gave up, so now there is no one to defend them. Paz assures Ginebra that she is the bad person for all the damage she did to Sam; Ginebra slaps her.
| 41 | "Ginebra es la que debería de estar en la cárcel" | 15 April 2024 | 3.03 |
Mauro assures Sam that he loves her and is incapable of harming her, she makes it clear that she only trusts Paz's family, so she asks him to help them. Esteban shows Kenzo some documents that make him suspect that Ginebra is responsible for Sam's disappearance. Ginebra slaps Filipa for stealing her thunder and reveals that she helped her have another child just so Kenzo would stay by her side. Paz regrets having involved innocent people in Sam's problem and blames herself for Dr. Mónica's death.
| 42 | "Necesito que Paz se declare culpable" | 16 April 2024 | 3.11 |
Gala gives her father a teddy bear with a camera to give to Sam, with the intention of checking if Ginebra and Mauro hurt her. Humberto offers Esteban his help as a lawyer to get Paz and her family out of jail, he hands him documents to prove her innocence. Ginebra prepares Sam's favorite dinner, but Sam tells her about the delicious fruit pancakes that Paz prepared for her, Ginebra gets upset. Humberto meets Paz and is stunned by her eyes, Esteban asks him to focus on helping her get out of jail, but he tells them that she needs to declare herself guilty in order to be released.
| 43 | "Háblame de tu pasado" | 17 April 2024 | 3.35 |
Gala criticizes her grandmother for being a closed-minded woman, as she has no doubt that she also made mistakes in her youth. Humberto assures Esteban that he needs malice to face Paz's situation, so he proposes that he seduce Ginebra. Esteban assures Ginebra that he is approaching her to understand her because if she is innocent, he would like to know the truth.
| 44 | "¡Eres mi hija!" | 18 April 2024 | 3.04 |
Esteban and Gala witness Ginebra abusing Sam and confirm that Paz always told the truth. Ginebra warns Paz that she will make her pay for all the damage she did to her, Paz assures her that she is innocent and will prove it. Esteban confesses to Paz that in order to help her, he needs to seduce Ginebra, she is upset because Ginebra has feelings for him. Elvira reveals to Ginebra that she is the daughter that was snatched from her arms.
| 45 | "Prefiero estar muerto" | 19 April 2024 | 2.68 |
Ginebra victimizes herself with Elvira and assures her that she always missed her as a mother since she grew up alone and was always exposed to many dangers. Esteban confirms that Ginebra killed her husband Elías and that he is next on her list. Ginebra attacks Esteban as she will not allow him to denounce her and end up imprisoned. Ginebra warns Esteban that she wants him for herself so she demands him to break up with Paz, he assures her that he would rather be dead than be her partner.
| 46 | "Paz tenemos que terminar" | 22 April 2024 | 2.74 |
Tuca arrives at Paz's cell to complain about taking her job in the kitchen; Paz warns her not to mess with her. Esteban and his family are victims of an attack after trying to flee from Ginebra. Esteban confronts Ginebra for messing with his family, she assures him that if he wants to get them to safety, he will have to end his relationship with Paz. Under pressure to save his family, Esteban visits Paz in jail and breaks up with her.
| 47 | "Ya logramos separarlos" | 23 April 2024 | 2.66 |
Esteban reveals to Paz that he only saw her as a game and got carried away by the moment; Paz, feeling humiliated, slaps him. Bosco is very concerned about Gala's situation and asks her if she has an eating disorder, to which she admits that she does. Ginebra visits Paz in jail to inform her that Sam hates her since she testified against her and is willing to tell the truth to contradict her lie. Mauro reveals to Ginebra that he injected Esteban with an animal tracker so they will know where he is and will be able to tap all the information around him.
| 48 | "Mataste a mi esposa" | 24 April 2024 | 2.86 |
Esteban assures Gala that Ginebra is a good mother, only that she is a victim of the circumstances that life has presented her. Esteban confronts Ginebra for being responsible for Berenice's death, as he is sure that she was only interested in killing his wife to get her hands on the family fortune. Paz tells Humberto that she has already been betrayed by two men who swore love to her, so she is not willing to fall into another game and asks him to focus only on getting her out of jail. Ginebra challenges Esteban and asks him to kiss her as if she were Paz and only then will she stop threatening his family.
| 49 | "Todo sea por ti mi amor" | 25 April 2024 | 2.80 |
Esteban confronts Humberto about his kindness to Paz, Humberto confesses that he is attracted to her. Elvira opens her heart to Ginebra and reveals that she is beginning to have feelings for Fobo. Humberto informs Paz that there are no charges against her for which the judge granted her freedom. Ginebra is determined to kill Cobija, but the arrival of Elvira, Sam and Monito, ruins her plans.
| 50 | "Usted será mi jefe y yo su empleada" | 26 April 2024 | 2.37 |
Gala takes to her social media and confesses to all her followers that she has an eating disorder because for many years she was obsessed with her weight. Sam asks Ginebra for help to save Cobija since she suddenly stopped breathing, Ginebra enjoys seeing her daughter's suffering. Elvira is upset to see that Paz has gained her freedom and does not hesitate to insult her, Esteban comes to her defense and prevents security from removing her from the company. Paz agrees to return to work at Esteban's house only because of Gala's situation and warns him that their relationship will only be a work relationship, she returns his promise ring.
| 51 | "Te quiero en mi cama todas las noches" | 29 April 2024 | 2.88 |
Fobo asks Elvira for a chance to win her heart, she accepts, but fears she will not reciprocate. Paz warns Esteban that she is determined to forget him, he begs her not to, but Ginebra calls him to threaten him. Ginebra announces to Gala that she is starting a relationship with Esteban, Gala can't believe that her dad has forgotten Paz so quickly. Humberto surprises Paz with a bouquet of flowers, she warns him that she cannot reciprocate since she is still in love with Esteban.
| 52 | "No debiste salir de la cárcel" | 30 April 2024 | 2.71 |
Paz is anxious to talk to Sam and communicates with her, Mauro overhears them. Eder defends Paz and assures Ginebra that it was his idea for Sam to have a cell phone and asks her not to scold her. Ginebra lets Eder know that Monito is a street kid and warns him to watch out for him as he could hurt him. Esteban shows Gala a scale with which they are going to monitor her weight and assures her that he, the doctor and she are the only ones who will have that information.
| 53 | "Vamos anunciar nuestro compromiso" | 1 May 2024 | 2.85 |
Mauro comes clean with Mireya and shares that he had a very hard childhood growing up living in the sewers with his sister Ginebra. Nandy is excited to process her documents to change her gender identity, but in the offices she is a victim of humiliation. Ginebra breaks the picture frame with Berenice's photo as part of her intimidation towards Esteban, Elvira arrives at the office and asks for an explanation. Witnessing Gala's suffering, Paz assures her that she wants to become her second mother to take care of her forever.
| 54 | "Ginebra confiesa sus crímenes" | 2 May 2024 | 2.88 |
Jerónimo and Sandro continue making transphobic comments to Nandy because they reject that their father has fallen in love with her. Ginebra reveals to Rubio that if he continues to work for her she will reward him financially, but first he must get Fermín out of her way. Esteban confronts Humberto when he learns that he is interested in Paz, he assures him that he will not allow him to see her as an affair. Ginebra shows Esteban photographs of the men she has killed to keep their fortune.
| 55 | "Ginebra y yo decidimos tener una relación" | 3 May 2024 | 2.65 |
Ginebra tells Elvira that she has financial problems, she offers her support, but Ginebra ends up complaining about her lack of support in the company and her delay in recognizing her as her daughter. Elvira and Fobo are almost seen kissing by Eder. Upon learning that Ginebra has once again hurt Samara, Paz does not contain her anger and takes advantage of her presence in her restaurant to slap her. Ginebra makes it clear to Paz that she will stop at nothing and that she is capable of finishing her off completely.
| 56 | "¿Vendiste a nuestra hija?" | 6 May 2024 | 3.01 |
Ginebra confesses to Elvira that she has an interest in Esteban, Elvira cannot believe that her two daughters fell in love for the same man. Elvira gathers the whole family to confess that Ginebra is the daughter she had years ago, but was taken from her by her father. Paz is ready to end Fermín's life if she can prove that he was capable of selling his own daughter. Paz takes advantage of the fact that she is alone with Fermín to confront him about the possibility that he sold their daughter to get out of debt.
| 57 | "En esta casa no eres más que la cocinera" | 7 May 2024 | 2.70 |
Esteban extends his support to Elvira after learning her secret, she implores him to reciprocate her daughter Ginebra's love. Sam and Monito discover that Ginebra is in possession of a baby, but Mauro prevents them from approaching the newborn. Gema tries to humiliate Gala with her illness, but she puts a stop to it by assuring her that she must create a video to prevent unwanted pregnancies. Paz admits to Esteban that Humberto was the person who helped her get her restaurant reopened, for which she is very grateful.
| 58 | "Conseguiste romperle el corazón a Paz" | 8 May 2024 | 2.77 |
Paz bursts into tears when she learns that Esteban and Ginebra are engaged. Elvira gives her blessing to Ginebra for the step she is about to take. Esteban tries to explain to Paz the reason why he decided to marry Ginebra, but she refuses to listen to him. Ginebra threatens Paz with making her life a living hell, Paz assures her that she is not afraid. Paz overhears Ginebra's conversation where she forces Esteban to marry her in three weeks.
| 59 | "¡Eres una psicópata!" | 9 May 2024 | 2.54 |
Gala is determined to close her social media accounts because she wants to start a new life and plans to change her look. Esteban, feeling harassed by Ginebra, goes crazy and assures Kenzo that everyone is in danger. Nandy finally receives the official documents that recognize her as a female, Paz and all her family congratulate her. Ginebra threatens to poison Sam if Esteban refuses to invite Paz to his wedding.
| 60 | "Estoy muy feliz de conocerte" | 10 May 2024 | 2.60 |
Esteban manages to communicate with Paz to inform her that he has found her daughter María and that it will be at his wedding with Ginebra that she will be able to meet her again. Paz prevents Esteban from marrying a woman he does not love and, in front of all the guests, challenges him to tell her that he has no feelings for Ginebra. Elvira, knowing that Paz is about to be reunited with her daughter, wishes that all the love she has is only for Maria and assures her that miracles do exist. Mauro and Ginebra put together a plan so that Paz can meet her daughter, but Humberto asks her to be cautious because he is not sure it is María.
| 61 | "Yo no quiero que seas mi mamá" | 13 May 2024 | 2.91 |
Paz confronts Max's supposed parents for stealing her daughter and assures them that they had no right to destroy a mother's life. Gala confesses to Jerónimo that she has never been with any man, he begins to seduce her and assures her that he is willing to teach her. Giovanna manages to get revenge on Bosco and accuses him of having abused her, he denies the accusations as the last thing he remembers is that she was hurting him. Gala is filled with pain when she remembers Jerónimo's criticism of her and in a fit of anger she hurts herself, but Esteban manages to get her out of danger.
| 62 | "¡Yo te quiero Paz!" | 14 May 2024 | 2.87 |
Humberto gives Paz the results of the DNA test and confirms that Max is her daughter. Giovanna reveals to Esteban and Elvira what Bosco did to her the night before, she threatens to denounce him, but Ginebra has another plan in her hands. Paz tries to gain her daughter Max's trust and reveals to her what happened the day she was born, but she does not listen to reason and shows a rebellious attitude. Humberto does not hesitate to give Paz all his support now that she has found her daughter and shows her how he feels about her with a kiss.
| 63 | "¡Soy tu mamá!" | 15 May 2024 | 2.56 |
Ginebra discovers Gio's obsession with Bosco and assures her that she is willing to see the extent of it so that his fall will hurt him even more. Paz begs Max to let her get to know her and tell her story, but Max wants nothing to do with Paz and in anger, attacks her. Esteban reveals to Humberto through written messages that Ginebra has threatened him and he fears for the lives of his family and Paz. Ginebra complains to Gala about the barrier she puts up to avoid having contact, she reveals that the whole situation with her father is strange to her.
| 64 | "Tengo dudas de que Max sea mi hija" | 16 May 2024 | 2.95 |
Paz introduces Max to the search mothers, but one of them recognizes the younger girl as her daughter because she has an unusual birthmark. Jerónimo arrives at Ginebra's office to threaten her for messing with Giovanna, Ginebra doesn't hesitate to put him in his place. Bosco is beaten on Jerónimo's orders, but Pepa comes to his defense. Faced with doubts about whether Max is her daughter, Paz is willing to take another DNA test.
| 65 | "Ginebra es una asesina" | 17 May 2024 | 2.81 |
Jerónimo tells Giovanna that she can have peace of mind if she agrees to ally herself with Ginebra, Giovanna does not hesitate and celebrates that she is destroying Bosco's life. Ginebra demands Esteban to respond to her as her husband, he refuses and assures her that he does not want her because she does not arouse him at all. Esteban takes advantage of the march where Paz is participating to reveal to her that Ginebra is a murderer.
| 66 | "Hay que renunciar al amor para seguir viviendo" | 20 May 2024 | 2.56 |
Esteban reveals to Paz that Ginebra murdered Elías Barral, her last husband, and he is sure that she also killed Berenice. Ginebra lets Elvira know that Elías left her with a large debt so she will have to sell her house and all her shares, Elvira asks her not to worry since she will include her in her will. Esteban swears to Paz that he will continue to fight to unmask Ginebra and asks her to keep their love a secret because he can't bear for them to be separated again. Paz makes Mireya see that she cannot fall in love with a criminal as it would take away her goodness and she may regret it forever.
| 67 | "En verdad pensamos que era tu hija" | 21 May 2024 | 2.68 |
Paz receives the results of the DNA test she did on Max and confirms that she is not her daughter, Fermín assures that Ginebra may be behind everything. Esteban dives into the bathtub with ice to lower his body temperature and eliminate the tracker that Ginebra placed on him; however, the situation gets out of hand. Elvira does not accept that Gala has a relationship with Salomón, as he is about to become a father. Gala begs Elvira to forget her beliefs and let her be happy. Mauro panics and asks Ginebra to escape before they are caught, she has a better strategy and shares that they will let Paz and Esteban off guard so that they will give themselves away. Paz informs Ginebra and Esteban that Max is not her daughter since she took another DNA test and assures them that if they are fooling her, she will make sure justice is done.
| 68 | "Eder los necesita unidos y fuertes" | 22 May 2024 | 3.26 |
Now that she has been included in Elvira's will, Ginebra is determined to reveal to her mother that she had her sister Berenice killed. Paz says goodbye to Max and assures her that her heart will always be open to her, Max thanks her and asks her forgiveness for her bad behavior. Ginebra poisons Eder so that Esteban won't fool her, Elvira believes that Paz is to blame for not preparing the food carefully. Mauro complains to Ginebra for hurting Eder, she gets angry and holds him responsible for her failed plans. Monito questions Sam if she believes that Ginebra is responsible for causing Eder to feel sick.
| 69 | "Te doy mi vida a cambio" | 23 May 2024 | 2.54 |
Ginebra confirms to Esteban that she hurt Eder, Esteban swears that she will pay dearly for hurting his son. Esteban begs Eder not to give up as they have many plans for the future; Gala blames herself for not taking care of her brother. Ginebra reaffirms that Mauro should have died in the orphanage fire and with that she proves to him that she never loved him the way he did. Esteban is desperate to save Eder and assures Ginebra that he is willing to give his life for his son to be healed, she only makes one request. Giovanna mocks the tragedy that the Villa de Cortés family is experiencing with Eder, but Gala slaps her.
| 70 | "Quiero un hijo tuyo" | 24 May 2024 | 2.63 |
Mauro asks Fermín to be his ally since he is his only option to get rid of Ginebra and Rubio. Ginebra questions Mauro about what he talked about with Fermín, but when she learns that he is lying to her, she warns him not to betray her. Paz offers to take care of Eder, but Esteban tells her that he will do it since he took care of his mother when she got sick. Ginebra assures Esteban that she doesn't need his love, all she wants is for him to give in to his instincts and make her a son. Jerónimo demands Filipa to tell him the reason why Ginebra is threatening her, she confesses that Sandro is not his brother.
| 71 | "Tenemos que salvar a Eder" | 27 May 2024 | 3.00 |
Elvira criticizes Mauro for kissing Mireya and assures him that she is not up to his standards, he defends his love and makes it clear that he wants to change. Jerónimo discovers Ginebra's illegal work and warns his mother that he does not intend to continue in her friend's business. Esteban gives himself to Ginebra to fulfill her wish with the sole intention of saving his son Eder. Mauro blames Ginebra for his panic attacks and begs her to save Eder. Gema is upset to see Gala with Salomón and threatens to hurt her baby.
| 72 | "Lo mejor es que nos vayamos de aquí" | 28 May 2024 | 3.04 |
Mauro is sure that Ginebra's opposition to his love for Mireya is because she cannot bear to remember when they were poor, and he implores her to stop hurting innocent people. Ginebra gives Eder an injection so that he can recover his health, Esteban thanks her for saving his son. Filipa looks for Humberto to ask for his help as a lawyer because she fears for her life because of Ginebra, she also reveals that Sandro is not her biological son. Filipa contacts Ginebra to inform her that she received some threatening letters, she asks her to disappear for a couple of days. Elvira visits Paz to ask her not to become a temptation for Esteban as it would be very humiliating to settle for the position of mistress.
| 73 | "Soy la dueña de tu alma" | 29 May 2024 | 3.04 |
Ginebra confesses to Mauro that she should have not fallen in love with Esteban. Humberto remembers the series of numbers that Esteban gave him and with them he manages to open a box and finds a flash drive, which could compromise Ginebra. Paz confesses to Gala that she has resumed her relationship with Esteban, but asks her to keep the secret since they are in danger because of Ginebra's threats. Ginebra congratulates Jerónimo for working as requested and reveals that Gala will be her next victim, he assures her that her plan will end his career. Kenzo is determined to fight for his love for Nandy and asks her to move in to his apartment.
| 74 | "Nos vamos al infierno" | 30 May 2024 | 2.64 |
Elvira informs Esteban that Ginebra will not make it home because of a last minute business trip, he makes a comment that leaves her thinking. Fermín sees a video of Sam asking for help in locating Paz's daughter, he is filled with emotion and is determined to reveal the truth. Fobo makes Elvira see that Ginebra is hiding something since her sudden trip is a clear example, she gets upset, but he assures her that he doesn't want to see her suffer. Ginebra announces to her enemies that she will not give up and if what they want is a confrontation, they will have it. Esteban manages to get Paz interviewed by an important television network to help her find her daughter María.
| 75 | "Tu hija es Sam" | 31 May 2024 | 2.87 |
Fermín faces Paz and reveals that it was him who sold María to Ginebra and that Sam is her daughter. Esteban confirms that Ginebra is guilty of Berenice's death and assures Humberto and Kenzo that the only way out is to eliminate her. Jerónimo asks Giovanna to end her alliance with Ginebra, she refuses because by stopping her plan against Bosco, she could end up in jail. Esteban takes Sam to Paz's house to reunite them. Fermín delivers the evidence to Humberto that will end Ginebra. Jerónimo can no longer hide his mother's secret and reveals to Kenzo that Sandro is not his son.
| 76 | "Te perdono Fermín" | 3 June 2024 | 3.05 |
Jerónimo confesses to Kenzo that Sandro is not Filipa's son either since Ginebra sold him to her. Mireya asks Mauro if he is willing to change and put aside all his evil, otherwise they cannot be together. Paz forgives Fermín and assures him that she does it for the love she has for her daughter and will fight every day for María to be happy, Fermín's heart cannot resist and dies. Paz asks her mother and Mireya to keep it a secret that Sam is her daughter María as she fears that Ginebra may act against her. Gema is determined to terminate her pregnancy, Salomón tries to stop her, but she assures him that if she is not happy, no one will be.
| 77 | "Sé que Samara es mi hija María" | 4 June 2024 | 2.86 |
Esteban says goodbye to Paz with a romantic kiss, Ginebra surprises them and threatens to kill every member of his family for defying her. Ginebra enters the Roble house ready to take Sam, Paz opposes and defends the girl's safety. Elvira confronts Ginebra for lying to her since her trip was not for business, she plays the victim by assuring her that her only family has turned their backs on her, Elvira does not fall for her blackmail and informs her that she will cut her out of the will. Paz and Esteban beg Mauro to betray Ginebra, but he refuses since for his sister there is no impossible. Mauro discovers that Paz already knows that Sam is her daughter María. Gala arrives at Salomón's house to teach him how to drive, as she wants him to gradually better himself.
| 78 | "Yo maté a Berenice" | 5 June 2024 | 3.20 |
Mireya agrees, out of love for her family, to convince Mauro to betray Ginebra, but he is suspicious of her plans. Ginebra receives the poison with which she plans to put an end to her enemies, since it only depends on her touching the skin of each one of them for the formula to destroy their cells. Paz takes advantage of Fermín's funeral to release an audio where he reveals all the crimes that Ginebra committed. Ginebra rants all the hatred she has for Elvira and confesses that she killed Berenice.
| 79 | "Ojalá te hubieras muerto en mi vientre" | 6 June 2024 | 3.05 |
Elvira is filled with hatred when she hears Ginebra's confession and assures her that she wished she had died in her womb. Paz arrives at the jail and slaps Ginebra, who mocks the pain she caused Paz. Elvira recognizes that she judged Paz without knowing her before and accepts that she hurt her a lot, so she asks for her forgiveness, Paz thanks her for the apology and accepts it. Esteban visits Ginebra in jail to inform her that Mauro betrayed her since he helped set her up. Ginebra threatens Filipa with a slow and painful death if she finds out that she also betrayed her.
| 80 | "¿Quieres casarte conmigo?" | 7 June 2024 | 2.74 |
Ginebra is taken to a cell where she begins to pay for all her crimes. Gala and Bosco learn that Sam is actually Paz's daughter. Esteban receives a message informing him that he is already divorced from Ginebra, he shares the happy news with Paz. Tuca's cellmates surprise Ginebra in the punishment cell and beat her. Mauro is upset to learn that what he paid for Ginebra's protection in prison did not work; Savón has other plans with Ginebra. Esteban proposes marriage to Paz because he wants to be by her side for life.
| 81 | "Ginebra es lo más importante que tengo en la vida" | 10 June 2024 | 2.87 |
Mauro can't get over Mireya breaking his heart, so he is determined to get revenge and Pedro Pablo will be his victim. Elvira announces Lupita as the winner of the Taco Queen competition and recognizes her cooking skills. Porfirio and Lupita kiss in front of everyone in attendance. Savón acknowledges Ginebra's strength and courage, but asks her to accept that she is no longer in charge and to analyze the proposal he made to her. Ginebra refuses to become Savón's slave, Mauro assures her that this is the only way they will be able to put an end to their enemies. Mauro kneels down in front of Savón and begs for his help to get Ginebra out of jail and in return, he is willing to do whatever he is asked to do.
| 82 | "Yo soy tu mamá" | 11 June 2024 | 2.72 |
Esteban delivers a letter to his father proving that he had nothing to do with his mother's death. Paz is filled with courage and reveals to Sam that she is her real mother; Sam embraces her with much love. When Ginebra sees that the guard does not want to give her water, she fights with her, and more guards arrive to defend their partner. Sam takes a picture of Fermín and thanks him for all the beautiful things she lived by his side and forgives him if he failed in something. Sam surprises the whole Roble family because for the first time she calls Paz mom.
| 83 | "Prometo amarte y respetarte hasta que la muerte nos separe" | 12 June 2024 | 3.15 |
Elvira recognizes that Esteban is a great man, so he should be happy with Paz, but regrets her daughter Ginebra's bad decisions. Paz and Esteban get married, he surprises Paz and all the guests by announcing that they were legally able to change Sam's name to María Villa de Cortés Roble. Lupita questions Elvira about the connection she has with Fobo, Elvira confesses that nothing can exist since there is a big age difference. Paz prepares to surprise Esteban with a romantic evening.
| 84 | "Ginebra no nos va a dejar en paz" | 13 June 2024 | 2.95 |
Elvira confesses to Fobo that she fell in love with him as strongly as he has shown his love for her and proves it to him with a kiss. Gala and Salo let themselves be carried away by passion, but by not being careful, they are caught by Gemma who immediately accuses them with Mireya and Lupita. Ginebra asks Mauro to be Pedro Pablo's first victim and shares that she does not tolerate him. Humberto arrives by surprise at Mireya's house to give her a bouquet of flowers, she gets nervous when she sees the detail. Rubio arrives at Paz's house determined to fulfill Ginebra's last request, even if it costs him his life.
| 85 | "Estoy libre y la justicia vendrá por todos ustedes" | 14 June 2024 | 2.76 |
Savón announces to Ginebra that he managed to bribe a couple of judges so that she could obtain her freedom, but first she must meet with her superior. Elvira complains to Geneva for choosing the path of evil, Ginebra blames her for having abandoned her and asks her to say goodbye to her happiness since her worst nightmare has just begun. Paz makes María see that the only one responsible for all the family's misfortunes is Ginebra, since she has caused them so much harm. Pepa can no longer hide his feelings and confesses to his mother and brother that his only wish is to go far away where he can be happy, they accept him as he is. Paz, Esteban and Elvira find out that Ginebra is out of prison because she negotiated her parole.
| 86 | "Mi venganza no es absurda" | 17 June 2024 | 2.96 |
Mauro gives Mireya 24 hours to escape with him, otherwise Salomón and Pepa will be in danger. Ginebra threatens Pazwith taking back her daughter Sam. Gala is filled with anger when she sees Ginebra and slaps her for causing so many misfortunes to her family. Bosco proposes to his father to hire someone to get rid of Ginebra, but Esteban forbids him to do so, since they are not going to become criminals. Savón tries to seduce Ginebra, but she puts a stop to him by assuring that she does not get involved with her associates, he in revenge informs her that Mauro is preparing to betray her. Mireya confesses to Humberto what she plans to do with Mauro, Humberto opposes because of the danger she will be exposed to and takes advantage of the moment to show his love for her.
| 87 | "¡Que comiencen las lágrimas!" | 18 June 2024 | 3.13 |
Jerónimo looks for Ginebra to ask for her help and in return he is willing to prove his loyalty by handing over the people she wants to kill. Humberto confirms that Mireya is in danger and confronts Mauro; however, Ginebra surprises them and shoots Humberto and Mireya, threatening to do the same to Mauro. Mauro complains to Ginebra for having hurt the woman he loves, she is indifferent and assures him that she does not know what the word love means. Elvira confesses to Esteban and Paz that she decided to give herself a chance with Fobo. Ginebra receives a call informing her that one of the victims of the attack lost their life, the news leaves Mauro with great uncertainty.
| 88 | "Te conviertes en mi esclavo o mueres" | 19 June 2024 | 3.13 |
Esteban thanks Humberto for returning to his life, but upon hearing the great love they have for each other and being at peace, he dies, Esteban vows to live up to his name. Mauro confirms that it was Savón who revealed to Ginebra the location where he would meet Mireya and confronts him. Esteban confronts Ginebra for messing with his family, Mauro saves her, but she does not thank him. Ginebra threatens Kenzo with death if he refuses to become her slave. Lupita takes it upon herself to reveal to Mireya that Humberto died, she suffers a crisis.
| 89 | "Te necesito viva y alerta" | 20 June 2024 | 3.25 |
Kenzo agrees to be Ginebra's slave in exchange for saving his life and the lives of his children, his first job is to get rid of Castro's body. Kenzo starts with Ginebra's plan and gives Esteban the card of a psychiatrist who could help the whole family. Elvira confronts Ginebra to end her revenge game, Ginebra refuses since she will not obey the orders of the woman who abandoned her. Gala, Salo, Bosco and Pepa fall into Jero and Gemma's trap and suffer severe intoxication when they are trapped in the car. Savón pretends to be a psychiatrist to enter Esteban's house and treat María. Paz observes him and realizes that he is a professional, so she authorizes him to continue treating her daughter.
| 90 | "Es hora de llevarte con tu mamá" | 21 June 2024 | 2.86 |
Mauro begs Ginebra to stop her plans for revenge since Rubio's attack was enough to traumatize Paz and Esteban's family, but she will not rest until she has Sam in her hands. Ginebra threatens Kenzo with revealing to Sandro that he is not his biological father if he refuses to follow her orders. Savón gains María's trust and gives her a sniff of a handkerchief with his fragrance on it, but she faints and he prepares to put Ginebra's plan into action. Savón informs Ginebra that the situation of taking Sam could get complicated since Paz fainted and the whole family's security is on alert.
| 91 | "¿Estás trabajando para Ginebra?" | 24 June 2024 | 3.34 |
After a check-up with the doctor, Paz confirms that she is pregnant. Jerónimo confesses to Kenzo that he planned the attack on Bosco, since he wanted revenge on Gala. Esteban does not allow Savón to scold him and Paz for the identity changes that María has undergone, but in reality Savón is only provoking them to distract them in order to kidnap her. Savón informs Ginebra that Paz is pregnant; when she learns the news, she plans to take away the child she is expecting. Esteban suspects that Kenzo is working for Ginebra, since it is the only way Savón could have entered the house posing as a psychologist.
| 92 | "¿Esto es una despedida?" | 25 June 2024 | 3.13 |
Paz and Esteban gather the whole family to announce her pregnancy. Mauro asks Ramsés Torrenegro to stop Ginebra and Savón's malice as he wants his niece to be happy with her family, but Ramsés does not forgive betrayals. Gala confronts Jerónimo about what happened and believes that he set them up since he is complicit with Ginebra, he feels cornered by Salomón and Bosco, but Sandro defends him. Filipa proposes to Jerónimo to flee so as not to be arrested, he opposes and assures her that he is willing to turn himself in to the authorities. Kenzo reveals to Esteban that Ginebra threatened to harm his children and out of fear, he was forced to follow her orders. Paz asks Esteban not to trust Ginebra since meeting with her is a mistake, so she proposes to accompany him, he opposes and begs her to stay home since she has to take care of the family and the baby that is on the way.
| 93 | "Tu vida me pertenece" | 26 June 2024 | 2.90 |
Ginebra asks Kenzo to be in charge of burying Esteban, she communicates with Paz and assures her that Esteban's punishment for not loving her was to kill him. Before meeting with Ginebra, Kenzo gave Esteban a bulletproof vest to avoid a tragedy and assures him that all this protection was sent to him by Mauro. Esteban assures Paz that Mauro was the one who helped him and is willing to betray Ginebra, Paz slaps Mauro for all the damage he has caused them. Mauro meets with María to ask her forgiveness for all the damage he did and assures her that thanks to her he knew what pure love is, she hugs him and acknowledges that he always defended her from Ginebra. Ginebra celebrates that she finally gets to meet Ramsés, he assures her that he knows everything about her and now her life belongs to him.
| 94 | "Ginebra está a punto de caer" | 27 June 2024 | 3.46 |
Ginebra proposes to Ramsés to be partners since they both run the same business; he gives her some time to convince him, otherwise her life would be in danger. Paz fulfills her wish to baptize María since it was one of her dreams when she was born. Ginebra interrupts the press conference to threaten Esteban's family and kill Elvira. Esteban prevents Ginebra from touching Elvira with the poison and causes her to hurt herself.
| 95 | "Te amo Esteban, mi cómplice de vida" | 28 June 2024 | 3.18 |
Ramsés challenges Ginebra and Mauro to fight each other and whoever manages to kill the other will receive several million dollars. Paz returns home and introduces her new daughter, Margarita. Ramsés gives Ginebra and Mauro a few hours to escape from the country, otherwise their souls will become his trophy. Ginebra threatens Paz with harm, Mauro prevents her from killing Paz, but Ginebra attacks him and they end up killing each other. Reassured that they are no longer in danger from Ginebra's evil, Paz and Esteban reaffirm that they are right for each other and celebrate that they have their family united.
