= Daniel Elbittar =

Venezuelan actor, model, singer (b. 1979)

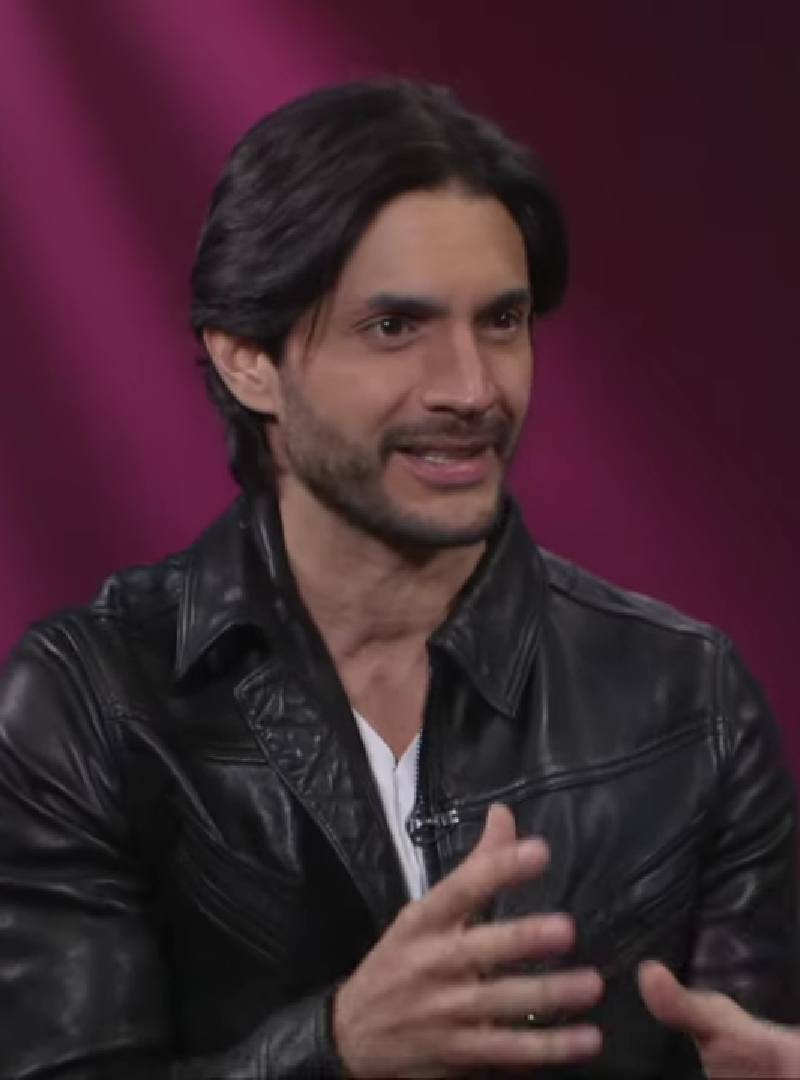
- Daniel Elbittar in 2022
- Born: Daniel Elbittar Villegas; April 30, 1979 (age 46); Caracas, Venezuela
- Occupations: Actor; singer; model
- Years active: 1998–present
- Spouse: Sabrina Seara (m. 2014)
- Musical career
- Genres: Balada; Pop
- Instrument: Vocals
- Website: elbittar.com

Daniel Elbittar Villegas (born April 30, 1979) is a Venezuelan actor, model and singer, best known for his work in both Venezuelan and Mexican telenovelas.

== Career ==
=== Acting career ===
Elbittar, began his career as an actor in 1998 in the Venezuelan telenovela produced by Venevisión Así es la vida, in 1999 he starred in the telenovela La calle de los sueños. After a year away from television, in 2001 he participated in Más que amor, frenesí with Maritza Bustamante. He had roles in several telenovelas later such as Engañada, Negra consentida and Olvidarte jamás. He has also appeared in several episodes of the series Decisiones, Lotería and Seguro y urgente. In 2007 he made his last telenovela in Venezuela for Radio Caracas Televisión, titled Camaleona. Which had problems during its transmission due to the problems of the closing of the channel.

In 2008 he moved from Miami to Mexico to sign a contract with network TV Azteca. His first production at TV Azteca was the telenovela Tengo todo excepto a ti. He later participated in several other telenovelas from the network such as Vidas robadas, Pecadora, La mujer de Judas and in the reality show La Isla.

In 2013 he debuted on American television in Find Me My Man, the show was broadcast on Oxygen on the NBC Universal Network.

In 2014 he starred in the telenovela Siempre tuya Acapulco, which was his last production for TV Azteca. While residing in Mexico he was part of the stage production of Mentiras, el musical, Ebittar later confirmed that his contract with TV Azteca had ended on good terms.

In 2015 he returned to Venezuela to start work on the production of the telenovela Entre tu amor y mi amor. The telenovela premiered in June 2016, being the most viewed production of Venevisión in the 9 pm time slot. In 2017 he began working with Telemundo, debuting in the telenovelas La Fan. His most recent project at the network being Guerra de ídolos with whom he shares credits with Venezuelan actress Sheryl Rubio.

=== Musical career ===
Elbittar began his career as a singer in the Venevisión series La calle de los sueños, prior to this, the band Calle Ciega considered adding him as a band member but Elbittar rejected the offer. Elbittar later played some songs for the telenovela Más que amor, frenesí. Following this work Elbittar took a hiatus from his music career for several years. In 2014 he signed a contract with Sony Music Mexico and Azteca Records to launch his album Quiero decirte which was produced by José Miguel Velásquez; the album was promoted with a tour taking place across Mexico, the United States, Puerto Rico, the Dominican Republic, Venezuela and Argentina. The first single from the album, titled "Quiero decirte", was part of the main theme of the telenovela Siempre Tuya Acapulco. Three songs from the album were written by David Bisbal and the rest by José Miguel Velásquez. In 2016, he released his single "Y estoy vivo" produced in Mexico by Juan Carlos Moguel, a single that was part of the telenovela Entre tu amor y mi amor.

== Personal life ==
Elbittar has been married since 2014 to Venezuelan actress Sabrina Seara, with whom he has a son, born in 2016.

== Filmography ==
List of appearances in television series and specials
Year	Title	Role	Notes
1998	Así es la vida	Emiliano	Supporting role
1999–2000	La calle de los sueños	Sebastián	Main role
2001	Más que amor, frenesí	Alberto José "Tito" Rodríguez Pacheco	Supporting role
2003	Engañada	Ricardo Viloria Ruiz Montero	Supporting role
2004	Negra consentida	Raimundo Aristiguieta Marthan	Supporting role
2006	Olvidarte jamás	Alejandro Montero	Main role; 112 episodes
2007	Seguro y urgente	Esteban	Episode: "Arriba las manos"
2007	Decisiones	Martín	Episode: "Hija bastarda"
2007	Camaleona	Juan Pablo Alcántara	Main role; 94 episodes
2008	Tengo todo excepto a ti	Antonio	Supporting role
2010	Vidas robadas	Javier Villafañe	Supporting role
2010	Pecadora	Ricky Millones	Main role
2012	La mujer de Judas	Alirio Agüero del Toro	Main role; 165 episodes
2013	Find Me My Man	Himself	
2014	Siempre tuya Acapulco	Diego Rivas	Main role; 124 episodes
2016	Entre tu amor y mi amor	Alejandro Monserrat	Main role; 110 episodes
2017	La Fan	Leonardo Márquez / El Potro	Guest role; 14 episodes
2017	Guerra de ídolos	Julio César Solar	Guest role; 2 episodes
2017	Sangre de mi tierra	Emilio Castañeda	Guest role; 10 episodes
2018	Selena's Secret	Chris Perez	
2019–2020	El Dragón: Return of a Warrior	Víctor Torres	Recurring role
2021	La desalmada	César Franco	Main role
2022	La herencia	Pedro del Monte	Main role
2023	El amor invencible	Gael Torrenegro	Main role
2023	¿Quién es la máscara?	Sardinas	
2024	El amor no tiene receta	Esteban Villa de Cortés	Main role
2025	Amanecer	Sebastián Peñaloza	Main role

== Discography ==
=== Studio albums ===
List of albums, with selected details
Title	Album details	Certifications
Quiero decirte	Released: 2014; Label: Sony Music Mexico and Azteca Records; Format: CD, digital download	

=== Singles ===
Title	Year	Album
"Quiero decirte"	2014	Quiero decirte
"In My House"	2014	Quiero decirte
"Dame"	2014	Quiero decirte
"Viento"	2014	Quiero decirte
"Me pintaré de tu color"	2014	Quiero decirte
"Allí estaré" (featuring Melissa Barrera or solo)	2014	Quiero decirte
"Está en peligro mi corazón"	2014	Quiero decirte
"Quiero decirte (Bachata)"	2014	Quiero decirte
"Y estoy vivo" (featuring Nacho or solo)	2016	Non-album singles
"Fuego cruzado (Regional)"	2017	Guerra de ídolos Soundtrack
