= Isabella Tena =

Mexican child actress (born 2007)

Isabella Tena Nava
- Born: January 25, 2007 (age 19); Mexico City, Mexico
- Occupation: Actress
- Years active: 2009–present
- Relatives: Ana Tena (sister)

Isabella Tena Nava (born January 25, 2007, in Mexico City, Mexico) is a Mexican actress.

Tena has participated in a series of telenovelas and theater plays, among them Mi corazon es tuyo alongside Jorge Salinas, Sueño de amor (where she acted alongside Julian Gil and in which her birthday was celebrated during an early recording of the show) and Mi marido tiene familia, alongside actress Silvia Pinal. Most recently, Tena has appeared in El amor no tiene receta playing the role of Gala.

She is the younger sister of actress Ana Tena.

== Filmography ==
=== Television ===
Year	Title	Role	Notes
2013–2014	La rosa de Guadalupe	Consuelo Doris	Episode: "Tres destinos" Episode: "La primera puerta"
2014	Mi corazón es tuyo	Luz "Luzecita" Lascurain Diez	
2015	En Familia Con Chabelo	Herself	Guest
2016	Sueño de amor	Selena Alegria	
2017	Como dice el dicho	Nayeli	Episode: "En casa de herrero, cuchillo de palo"
2017	Mi marido tiene familia	Frida Córcega	
2018–2019	Mi marido tiene más familia	Frida Córcega	
2023	El amor invencible	Ana Julia Peralta Torrenegro / Ana Julia Torrenegro Ramos	
2024	El amor no tiene receta	Gala	
2025	Riquísimos, por cierto	Taylor	Episode: "Los XV de Morris"

=== Internet shows ===
Year	Title	Role
2018	Que mosca te picó	Herself
2020	Show de Polly	Herself

=== Theater ===
Year	Title	Role
2015	Mi corazón es tuyo	Luz "Luzecita" Lascurain Diez
2016	Tu no existes	Ana

== Awards and nominations ==
=== Kids Choice Awards México ===
Year	Category	Result
2015	Favorite Newcomer	Won
