= Guillermo García Cantú =

Mexican actor

- Born: 23 April 1960 (age 66); Monterrey, Mexico
- Occupation: Actor
- Years active: 1986–present

Guillermo García Cantú (born 23 April 1960) is a Mexican actor best known for his work in telenovelas. He began his acting career in 1986 when he was 26.

== Filmography ==
=== Film ===
Year	Title	Role	Notes
1983	Cuarteto para el fin del tiempo	Unknown role	Short film
1989	Cita con la muerte	Emilio	Episode: "No estoy jugando"
1991	Dentro de la noche	Unknown role	
1992	Imperio de los malditos	Unknown role	
1993	En medio de la nada	Unknown role	
1994	Vagabunda	Miguel	

=== Television ===
Year	Title	Role	Notes
1985	De pura sangre	Anselmo	
1986	El engaño	Luis Gustavo	
1987	Cómo duele callar	Mauro	
1988	Papá soltero	Unknown role	Episode: "Lucerito regresa"
1989	La casa al final de la calle	Braulio	
1990	Cuando llega el amor	Rodrigo Fernández Pereira	
1989–90	Horas marcadas	Emilio	Episodes: "No estoy jugando" and "El Johhny"
1991	Atrapada	Víctor	
1992	Triángulo	David	
1993	Valentina	Víctor Luján	
1994	Marimar	Bernardo Duarte	
1994	Volver a empezar	Tony	
1995	Acapulco, cuerpo y alma	Marcelo	
1996	Canción de amor	Lic. Arizmendi	
1996	Marisol	Raúl Montemar	
1997	Salud, dinero y amor	Felipe	
1999	Serafín	Raúl	
1999	Rosalinda	José Fernando Altamirano	
2001	Mujer bonita	Leopoldo	
2001	La intrusa	Rodrigo "Junior" Junquera Brito-Rivadeneyra Vargas	Supporting role
2004	Amar otra vez	Guillermo Montero Arrarte	Supporting role
2005	La madrastra	Demetrio Rivero	Main cast
2005–2006	Peregrina	Carreón	Supporting role
2006–2007	Código postal	Claudio Garza Moheno	Main cast
2008	Fuego en la sangre	Fernando Escandon	Main cast
2009–2010	Camaleones	Augusto Ponce de León	Main cast
2010–2011	Triunfo del amor	Guillermo Quintana	Main cast
2014	La malquerida	Norberto Palacios	Main cast
2015	Lo imperdonable	Aarón Martínez	Supporting role
2016	Las amazonas	Loreto Guzmán Valdéz	Main cast
2018–2019	Por amar sin ley	Alonso Vega	Main cast
2019–2020	Médicos	Alonso Vega	Guest star; 10 episodes
2021	Te acuerdas de mí	Olmo Cáceres	Main cast
2022	Los ricos también lloran	Alberto Salvatierra Ruiz	Main cast
2022	María Félix: La Doña	Bernardo Félix Flores	Supporting role
2023	El amor invencible	Ramsés Torrenegro	Main cast
2024	El amor no tiene receta	Ramsés Torrenegro	Guest star
2024–2025	Las hijas de la señora García	Luis Portilla	
2026	Hermanas, un amor compartido	Silverio Beristáin Cuevas	

== Awards and nominations ==
Year	Category	Program	Result
1986	Best Male Debut	De pura sangre	Nominated
1987	Best Young Lead Actor	El engaño	Nominated
1990	Best Young Lead Actor	La casa al final de la calle	Nominated
1996	Best Male Antagonist	Acapulco, cuerpo y alma	Nominated
2002	Best Co-star Actor	La Intrusa	Nominated
2006	Best Male Antagonist	La Madrastra	Nominated
2009	Best Male Antagonist	Fuego en la sangre	Won
