= José Miguel Velásquez =

Jose Miguel Velasquez
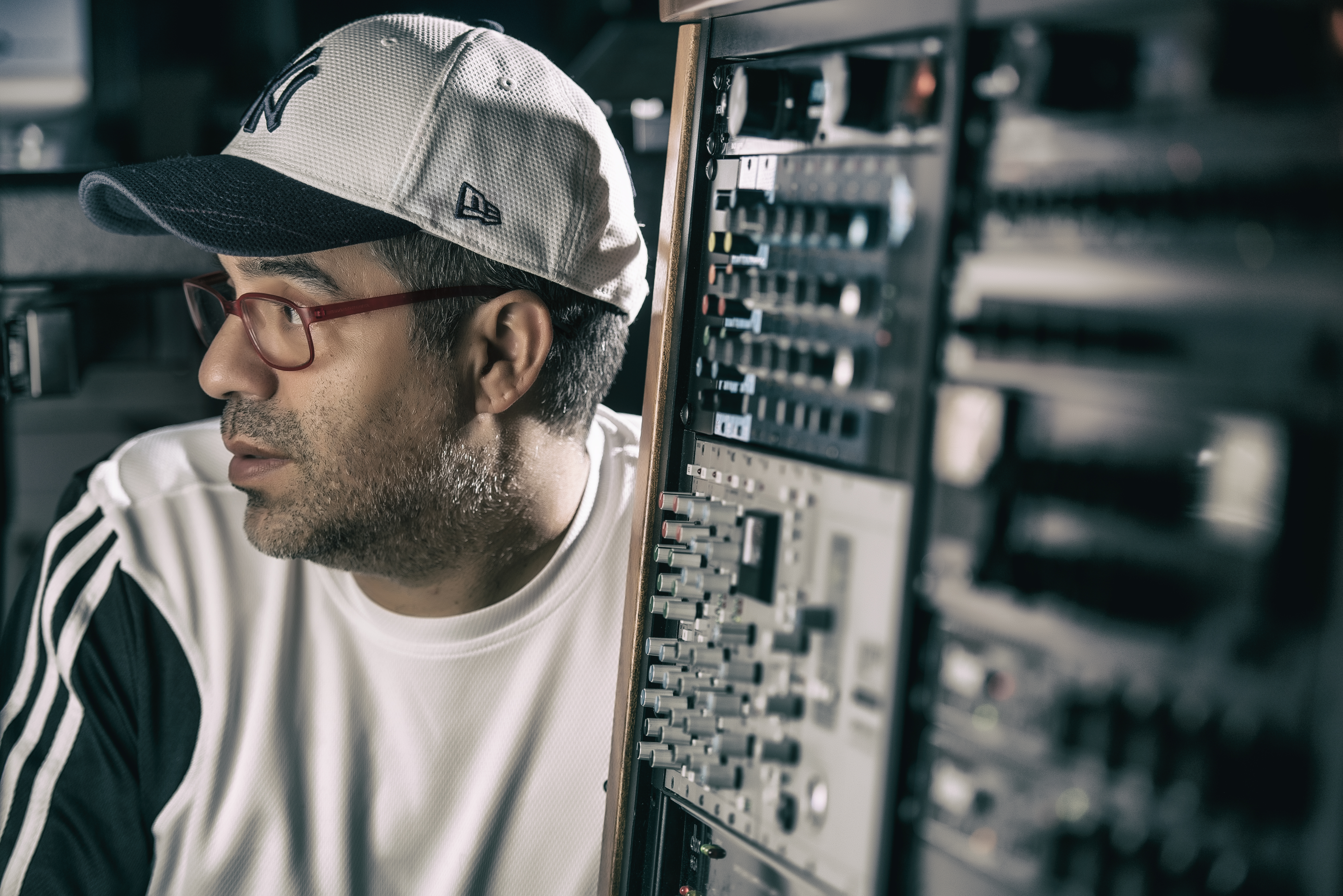
- Born: November 2, 1967 (age 58); Caracas, Venezuela
- Occupations: Producer; Entrepreneur
- Years active: 1980–present
- Musical career
- Genres: Latin pop; dance-pop; pop; adult contemporary; electronic
- Website: www.josemiguelvelasquez.com

Jose Miguel Velasquez (born November 2, 1967) is a Venezuelan-born composer, music producer and vocal coach to several internationally famous recording artists. He currently resides in Miami, Florida, United States. He has been the recipient of two BMI Awards and a Latin Grammy Award.

== Early life ==
Jose Miguel Velasquez was born in 1967 in Caracas, Venezuela. As a child, he sang in his school’s choir and learned to play piano, drums and the traditional Venezuelan guitar known as the cuatro. From age 13 to 20, he worked as a DJ in several local clubs, and at age 16 was keyboard player and composer in the punk rock band Toque de Queda. He also participated in the ska group Desorden Público.

== Professional career ==
After years of studying vocal music, Velasquez developed a technique that he claimed would allow an artist to develop their entire vocal range without overexerting the vocal musculature, and while maintaining the unique sound of each artist’s own voice. He began working professionally as a vocal coach in 1990, and has coached artists including Ricky Martin, Shakira, Enrique Iglesias, David Bisbal, Sofia Vergara, and others. Velasquez moved to Miami, FL in 1995 after a chance encounter put him in the recording studios of Emilio Estefan, who offered Velasquez a contract as composer and producer. Today, he operates his own recording studio in Miami, where he continues to work as a vocal coach and composer/producer of Latin pop music. His work has been nominated for several Grammy Awards, he has won two BMI Awards for writing/production and a Latin Grammy for recording/sound engineering. His song No Me Rendiré, sung by Jaci Velasquez and Pablo Portillo held a spot in the Billboard Latin Pop Top 15. Several of his songs have been used as theme songs for telenovelas in the United States and Latin America, including “Catalina y Sebastián” (No A Pedir Perdón), “Soñar No Cuesta Nada” (Soñar No Cuesta Nada), “Siempre Tuya Acapulco” (Quiero Decirte), “Marido En Alquiler” (Desnudo).

== Writing credits ==
Album	Year	Song
“Soy Como Soy” by Ana Gabriel	(studio album, 1999)	No A Pedir Perdón
“Mi Corazón” by Jaci Velasquez	(studio album, 2001)	Mi Corazón
“Mal Acostumbrado” by Fernando Villalona	(Sony International, 2002)	Mal Acostumbrado
“Almas del Silencio” by Ricky Martin	(studio album, 2003)	Jaleo
“Bulería” by David Bisbal	(studio album, 2004)	Cómo Olvidar, Desnúdate Mujer
“Todo De Mi” by Janina	(Univision Records, 2005)	Y No Termina De Llover, Vete Ya
“Atrévete A Olvidarme” by Brenda K. Starr	(Boss Sounds, 2005)	Sin Corazón
“Desnudo” by Gabriel Coronel	(Warner Music Latina, 2013)	Desnudo, Yo Te Amé, La Fuerza De Mi Ser
“Quiero Decirte” by Daniel Elbittar	(Sony Music, 2014)	Quiero Decirte
“Tú Y Yo” by David Bisbal	(Universal, 2014)	Lo Que Vendrá
