= Claudia Martín =

Mexican actress (born 1989)

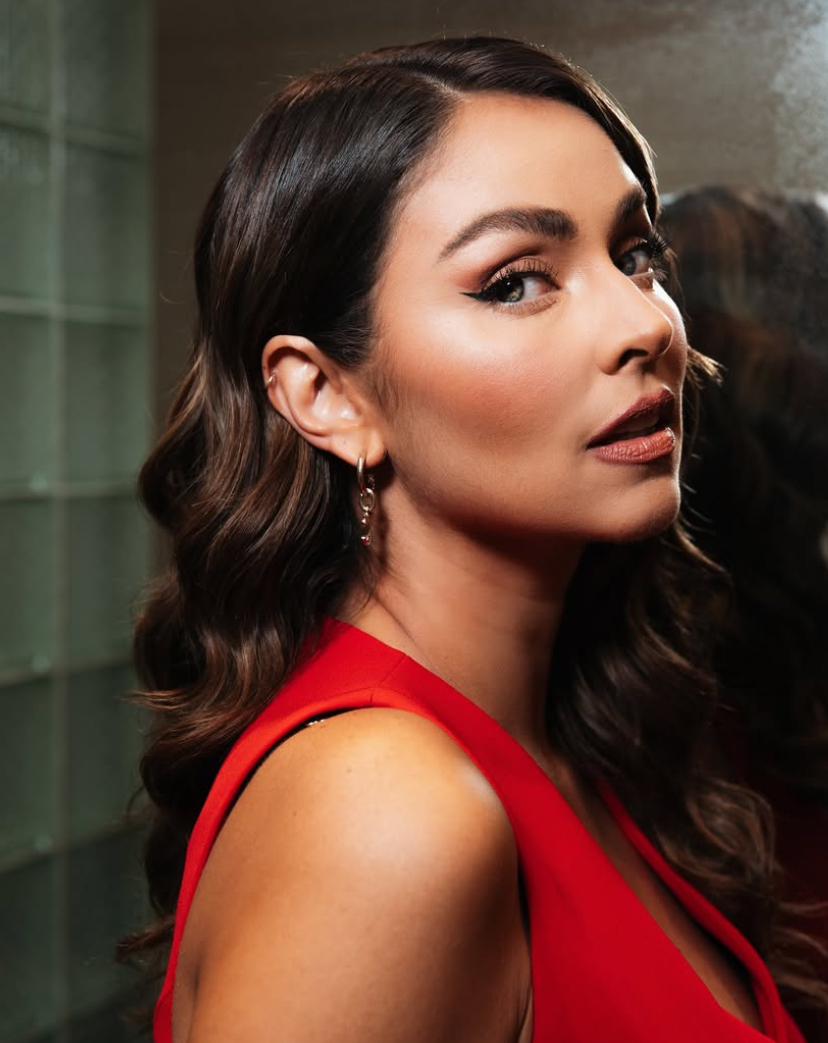
- Claudia Martín in 2025
- Born: Claudia Martín Martínez; August 28, 1989 (age 36); Oaxaca de Juárez, Mexico
- Occupations: Actress; model
- Years active: 2009–present

Claudia Martín (born Claudia Martín Martínez on 28 August 1989 in Oaxaca de Juárez, Mexico) is a Mexican actress and model.

== Early life ==
Martin was born and raised in Oaxaca de Juárez, Mexico. She showed interest in acting and performing from a young age. During her childhood, she danced and sang. She earned a degree in Audiovisual Communication from Charles III University of Madrid. She lived in Madrid for four years and briefly lived in England where she studied English. After graduating, she returned to Mexico.

== Acting career ==
When Martín studied in Madrid, she enrolled in acting classes and studied costume design. Upon returning to Mexico City, she worked at the media company, Televisa, as a costume designer for its various productions. After a year, she quit her job and became auditioning at castings for Televisa which eventually led to her first acting roles. She eventually enrolled in Centro de Educación Artística, the drama school run by Televisa and graduated in 2015 after completing three-year course. She appeared in several school plays and productions during her time at CEA. Since 2015, Martín has acted in several television programs including the telenovela drama, Enamorándome de Ramón, where she had a co-starring role. In August 2017, she was announced as the lead for the telenovela, Sin tu mirada, a remake of the popular 1997 Mexican soap opera, Esmeralda. The part is her first starring role in a telenovela.

== Television roles ==
| Year | Title | Role | Notes |
|---|---|---|---|
| 2009 | Doctor Mateo | | Episode: "De cómo espacio y tiempo son relativos y siempre coinciden en el peor momento" |
| 2010 | La princesa de Éboli | Unknown role | 2 episodes |
| 2015 | Amores con trampa | Unknown role | 50 episodes |
| 2015–2016 | Como dice el dicho | Leila / Brenda | 2 episodes |
| 2016 | Un camino hacia el destino | Vicky | 24 episodes |
| 2016 | Sueño de amor | Anya | 18 episodes |
| 2017 | Enamorándome de Ramón | Andrea | 115 episodes |
| 2017–2018 | Sin tu mirada | Marina Ríos | Main role, 112 episodes |
| 2018–2019 | Love to Death | Eva Carvajal | 87 episodes |
| 2019 | Alma de ángel | Yolanda | Episode: "Yolanda (La corredora)" |
| 2020 | Como tú no hay 2 | Natalia Lira Vargas | 75 Episodes |
| 2021 | Fuego ardiente | Martina Ferrer | |
| 2022 | Los ricos también lloran | Mariana Villarreal | |
| 2022 | Mujeres asesinas | Adriana | Episode: "La chef" |
| 2023 | Vencer la culpa | Paloma | |
| 2024 | El amor no tiene receta | Paz Roble Ruiz | |
| 2025 | Juegos de amor y poder | Luciana Espinoza | |
