= El amor invencible =

- Genre: Telenovela
- Based on: Mar Salgado by Inês Gomes
- Developed by: Pablo Ferrer García-Travesí; Santiago Pineda Aliseda
- Written by: Hugo Moreno Cano; Juan Osorio; Claudia Vázquez; Lilian Gatica
- Directed by: Eric Morales
- Starring: Angelique Boyer; Danilo Carrera; Leticia Calderón; Daniel Elbittar; Marlene Favela; Guillermo García Cantú
- Theme music composer: Lalo Murguía; Mauricio Arriaga; Ricardo Larrea
- Composers: Armando López; Enrique E. Pérez
- Country of origin: Mexico
- Original language: Spanish
- No. of seasons: 1
- No. of episodes: 80

Production
- Executive producer: Juan Osorio
- Producer: Ignacio Ortíz Castillo
- Editors: Felipe Ortíz Canseco; Socorro Manrique Díaz; Alejandro M. Iglesias
- Production company: TelevisaUnivision

Original release
- Network: Las Estrellas
- Release: 20 February – 9 June 2023

El amor invencible (English: The Invincible Love) is a Mexican telenovela that aired on Las Estrellas from 20 February 2023 to 9 June 2023. The series is produced by Juan Osorio. It is an adaptation of the Portuguese telenovela Mar Salgado, created by Inês Gomes. It stars Angelique Boyer and Danilo Carrera.

== Plot ==
After losing all her loved ones fifteen years ago and believing her babies were killed at the hands of the father of her first love, Leona Bravo (Angelique Boyer) embarks on a journey of justice against all those who hurt her. In this process, Leona discovers that her children are actually alive and is reunited with an old friend with whom she finds true love. As a result, she will be torn between her desire for justice and rebuilding her bond with her two children, as well as regaining her faith in love.

== Cast ==
- Angelique Boyer as Marena Ramos / Leona Bravo
  - Dalexa Meneses as Young Marena
- Danilo Carrera as Adrián Hernández / David Alejo
  - Mikel Mateos as Young Adrián
- Leticia Calderón as Josefa
- Daniel Elbittar as Gael Torrenegro
  - Daney Mendoza as Young Gael
- Marlene Favela as Columba Villareal
- Guillermo García Cantú as Ramsés Torrenegro
- Arcelia Ramírez as Consuelo
- Gabriela Platas as Camila
- Alejandra Ambrosi as Jacinta
- Víctor González as Calixto
- Luz María Jerez as Clara
- Isabella Tena as Ana Julia
- Emiliano González as Benjamín
- Ana Tena as Lola
- Karla Gaytán as Itzel
- Lukas Urkijo as Teo
- Abril Michel as Kika
- Pedro de Tavira as Matías Torrenegro
- Regina Velarde as Flor
- Cinthia Aparicio as Rita
- José Daniel Figueroa as Jeremías
- Luis Arturo as Romeo
- Carlos Orozco P. as Cristóbal
- Sebastián Guevara as Oliver
- Mía Fabri as Lily
- Juanpa Molina as Danilo
- Juan Soler as Apolo

== Production ==
=== Development ===
In July 2022, Juan Osorio announced that he had started pre-production on his next telenovela, with the working title being Amor imposible. Filming began on 7 November 2022.

=== Casting ===
In August 2022, Anette Michel was confirmed as part of the cast. On 22 September 2022, it was announced Leticia Calderón had joined the cast. On 7 October 2022, Angelique Boyer and Danilo Carrera were confirmed in the lead roles. On 14 October 2022, Guillermo García Cantú, Luz María Jerez, Marjorie de Sousa, Daniel Elbittar joined the cast in main roles. On 24 October 2022, it was announced that Marlene Favela had joined the cast. On 27 October 2022, it was announced that Marjorie de Sousa and Anette Michel had exited the production. Michel explained that she exited due to the fact that she did not finish shooting a film on time, while de Sousa dropped out because she had not yet finished the filming of El Conde: Amor y honor.

== Episodes ==
No.	Title	Original release date	Mexico viewers (millions)
1	"El amor a veces duele"	20 February 2023 (Note: Premiered early online through Las Estrellas website on 17 February 2023.)	3.9
Gael loses control of his jet ski runs into Marena. Gael asks Marena to be his girlfriend; however, this causes Adrián to suffer since he is also in love with her. Marena tells Gael that she is pregnant, he forces her to abort her baby, as he fears losing all his fortune. Marena decides to end things with Gael. Marena finds out that she will be having twins, Adrián offers his help, but she prefers to raise her children on her own. Gael discovers that his father, Ramsés, is involved with human trafficking. Marena denounces Ramsés and in revenge, he murders her family.
2	"Marena está muerta"	21 February 2023	4.0
Gael tries to stop his father from hurting Marena, but he shoots her. Adrián performs a C-section to save Marena's life and that of the babies, when the boy does not breath he is abandoned and the baby girl is taken. Ramsés causes the hospital where Marena is being treated to burn down. Consuelo informs Marena that her children did not survive the attack. Adrián learns of Marena's death. Marena under the name of Leona Bravo is determined to make the Torrenegro pay for what they did. Gael is reunited with Ana Julia. Adrián learns that the Torrenegro family has returned to Mexico City to expand their business. Josefa makes it clear to Columba that as a mother she is not the best, so she puts her family in order. Columba finds Gael kissing Camila's nurse, she tells him that despite all his indifference she still loves him. Leona is shocked when she runs into David.
3	"Yo puedo cambiar su vida"	22 February 2023	3.8
David tells Leona that her eyes remind him of a special person. Gael confronts his mom and reveals that in order to change he needs to release his past. David tells his mom that he has found love and discovers that Leona is going to live next door. Camila assures Calixto that he is a hypocrite for pretending to love her. When Leona learns that Benjamín is the same age as the son she lost, she begins to cry, and he consoles her. Gael reproaches Columba for not being a mother who takes care of her children. Jacinta refuses to reveal to Benjamín his true origin. David confesses to his family that he is convinced that Leona is really Marena because there are many coincidences. Ana Julia and Benjamín meet. David arrives at the Torrenegro's house to help Camila in her rehabilitation. Leona is reunited with Gael.
4	"¡Tus hijos están vivos!"	23 February 2023	3.8
Leona begs Gael for a job interview. Columba warns Gael that he is forbidden to hire women as consultants. Gael agrees to a meeting with Leona and arranges to meet her at his house. Itzel tells her parents that she met two members of the Torrenegro family. Ramsés surprises his family with his arrival. David shows Leona a photo of them when they were teenagers, he assures her that he has not stopped loving her and steals a kiss, she asks for time. Gael has a confrontation with Ramsés. Consuelo reveals to Marena that she had to lie to her to save her life. Ramsés, feeling the love of his granddaughter Ana Julia, reveals to her that she will be the only heir. Adrián confesses to Leona that her children are alive, but asks her to call him David for security reasons.
5	"Unidos para derrocar el mal"	24 February 2023	3.9
David confesses to Leona that he went to work at the Torrenegro house to avenge her death, she confirms that they both have the same goal, he kisses her, but she makes it clear that she has no time for love. Lola uploads sensual content and manages to captivate Calixto. Leona talks with Kika, but she is rude, Ana Julia greets Leona and notices her tattoo, she shares the meaning of it. Josefa forbids Oliver to be medicated and takes away Columba's authority as a mother. Leona runs into her children at the same time and the three of them have a special connection. Leona sees that Oliver is suffering a crisis, gives him first aid and manages to stabilize him. Gael learns that Manuel gave Oliver the medication with Columba's authorization.
6	"Quiero arrancarle la vida"	27 February 2023	3.9
Ramsés threatens Columba for medicating Oliver. Gael gives Leona the position as an advisor. Gael asks Columba for a divorce. Leona is reunited with Ramsés, who thanks her for saving his grandson. Columba warns Gael that if he sees any strange behavior with Leona, she will fire her. Leona reveals to Consuelo that her twins are alive. Leona tells Jacinta that she would like to know more about her family now that she knows that Adrián is David, Jacinta asks her to be discreet since her children do not know about David's past.
7	"Un monstruo que se alimenta del miedo"	28 February 2023	3.6
Leona is willing to cause the most pain to Ramsés as revenge for killing her family. Ana Julia asks her mother if she is no longer in love with Calixto since she has seen them distant lately. Ramsés surprises Leona in her house and assures her that he knows everything about her. Ramsés notices Leona's nervousness, intimidates her and assures her that she can go through hell if she denies her loyalty. Leona tells David that Ramsés may already knows who she is, he asks her to be cautious. Columba tries to humiliate Leona, but she defends herself.
8	"Va a recibir lo que merece"	1 March 2023	3.6
Gael tells Columba to stop offending Leona. Camila confesses her secret to David. Jeremías is willing to reveal to Ramsés that David is really Adrián. Gael thanks Benjamín for stopping the fight between Itzel and Kika, Benjamín asks him to take good care of Leona. Leona knows that the perfect moment to take revenge on Ramsés is during his event. David encourages Camila to resume her life, he proposes her to dance with her wheelchair, Camila feels something special for him.
9	"Los errores se pagan"	2 March 2023	3.8
Leona proposes to Ana Julia to get to know each other better. Oliver refuses to go to his grandfather's party and tells his mother that he will only do so if Leona come gets him. Manuel tries to ruin Ramsés' party. Leona sees that Ana Julia is in danger and changes the order of the event, but a guard is the one who is electrocuted by the microphone she had prepared for Ramsés. Jacinta asks Jeremías for a divorce. Ramsés, seeing that Leona was not attentive to every detail of the event, fires her, Gael asks him to give her another chance. Gael confesses to Leona that now that she will not be working with him, he will miss her a lot. Leona assures Columba that after her departure, she is left without competition, Columba humiliates her. Ramsés kill Manuel and asks Calixto to get rid of the body. Gael arrives at the neighborhood where Leona lives and discovers his friendship with David.
10	"¡Leona, sálvame!"	3 March 2023	4.0
Gael confesses to Leona that he will do everything he can to get her to come back to work with him because she reminds him of a woman from his past. Leona confesses to David that she is confused by what Gael told her, he asks her not to believe his words. Gael confronts his dad and assures him that he wants Leona back in the company. Columba gives Gael a note where Oliver says that if Leona does not return, they will never see him again. Lola agrees to meet with the man who buys her content. Leona receives a call asking for a large amount of money in exchange for Oliver's freedom, Gael begs Leona to save his son. Josefa puts a stop to Columba for bringing up the subject of the daughter Gael had with Marena. Leona arrives to pay Oliver's ransom.
11	"Bienvenida a la familia, Leona"	6 March 2023	3.8
Gael thanks Leona for saving Oliver. Calixto poses as Ramsés and meets with Lola to ask her to be his lover. Columba is upset to learn that it was Leona who rescued Oliver and claims that she planned the kidnapping. David questions Leona if she still loves Gael, she tells him that the only thing he provokes in her is hatred. Gael questions Leona if she is involved with David. Columba counters Leona's authority in the company. Columba asks Calixto to fulfill her as a man and she will know how to reward him. Leona seeks to gain Kika's trust, but she rejects her. Consuelo receives the results of her exam. Ana Julia confirms that Kika is using drugs. Camila kisses David and confesses that she feels lonely. Ana Julia, Benjamín and Kika are involved in a car accident.
12	"¡Ella es mi hija!"	7 March 2023	3.9
David informs Leona that Ana Julia and Kika are in the hospital. Leona discovers that Kika has the same blood type as her and will look for a way to prove that she is her daughter. Gael reveals to Leona that in the past he lost a son. Itzel confesses to her family that she likes Benjamín, but is afraid to fall in love. Jacinta wants to confess to Leona that Benjamín is her son. Ramses recognizes that Leona has become an angel for his family. Ana Julia falls into cardiac arrest, the doctor informs Gael that her heart stopped beating for a couple of seconds. Benjamín does not recognize Leona.
13	"Siento que el amor volvió a mi vida"	8 March 2023	3.7
David asks Benjamín not to feel guilty about the accident, Leona tries to calm him down. Ramsés tells Kika that when she gets out of the hospital she will start to rehabilitate herself. Leona is sure that she has already found her daughter, so she wants to win Kika's affection. Josefa tells Ramsés that if Ana Julia wakes up, she is determined to tell her the truth. Kika wakes up from the accident and hears Josefa say that Ana Julia is adopted. Leona confesses to Consuelo that she has feelings for David. Columba confirms to Kika that Ana Julia is not Camila's daughter, they decide to use this information to their advantage. Leona accompanies Consuelo to her biopsy. Kika thanks Leona for donating blood to save her life, Leona asks her to give her the opportunity to prove to her that she is a good person.
14	"Quiero recuperar el tiempo a tu lado"	9 March 2023	3.7
David kicks out Jeremías from the house, he threatens the family. David surprises Leona with a romantic dinner by the sea, both confess their love to each other. Columba apologizes to Oliver for not being close to him. Benjamín is thrilled to learn that Leona could become his aunt. Gael can't stop thinking about Leona. Columba seduces Ramsés. Ana Julia reveals to Gael that sometimes she feels that he is her father since Calixto is very distant.
15	"El daño que provocan los secretos"	10 March 2023	3.4
Lola, knowing that her father has no money to rent a hotel room, asks Calixto for help. Ramsés catches Josefa with the letter from her old love and confronts her. Leona confirms to Consuelo that she has cancer. Calixto begins to grant Lola's wishes, but in return he asks for a kiss. Jeremías assures Benjamín that David and his mother have been lying to him all his life, Benjamín confronts his uncle and demands that he tell him the truth.
16	"El dolor también une"	13 March 2023	3.2
Consuelo informs her family that she has cancer. Benjamín learns that his uncle David's name is really Adrián Hernández and that Leona Bravo is really Marena. Josefa wants to work in the family business, Ramsés opposes, but Gael supports her. Leona gives Ana Julia and Kika a gift. Ana Julia asks Benjamín to give them a chance to be friends. Columba takes advantage of Leona's mistake at the business meeting to present her proposal. Leona confirms that Columba stole her presentation so she enters the meeting with the shareholders and confronts her.
17	"Hasta las últimas consecuencias"	14 March 2023	3.3
Leona is sure that Columba plagiarized her presentation. Josefa demands that Gael sanction Leona. Columba congratulates Calixto for hacking Leona's computer, but he makes a request. David enters Kika's bedroom to take some hair samples. Gael mentions to Leona that she reminds him a lot of Marena Ramos, the great love of his life. Leona sees that Josefa is having trouble with technology and wants to help her. Leona meets Romeo and learns that he is adopted since his parents died in a fire. Dano's parents arrive at the Torrenegro's house to demand an explanation about what happened to their son, not having a clear answer, they take Ana Julia hostage.
18	"¡Vivan los novios!"	15 March 2023	3.2
Itzel kisses Benjamin, seeing that he only wants her as a friend, she apologizes. David asks Leona not to get attached to Romeo as she may be confusing things. Gael feels complicit with his dad for keeping quiet that he is a human trafficker. David takes advantage of the fact that his whole family is together to ask Leona to be his girlfriend. Clara criticizes Itzel's appearance. Columba assures Ramsés that the kiss they gave each other was an invitation to fall into the forbidden. Ramses records Columba without her consent while they are intimate.
19	"Como si te conociera de toda la vida"	16 March 2023	3.4
Calixto discovers that Lola is Kika's friend. Ana Julia asks Leona for a hug and tells her that Kika insulted her by assuring her that she's not like the rest of the family. Leona makes it clear to Calixto that she doesn't like the way he looks at her. Columba destroys Oliver's gift and shows how much she hates Leona. Columba becomes an accomplice of Ramsés to destroy Josefa inside the company and at the same time, he asks Leona to be his spy in the office. Leona discovers that all her money was stolen. Columba, Ramses and Calixto have their new plan ready to recruit young people. Ana Julia learns that Itzel kissed Benjamín. Columba finds out that Calixto left Leona's account in zeroes and tells him that his reward is to keep the money, but he wants Columba in bed.
20	"¡Ella no es mi hija!"	17 March 2023	3.4
Gael is determined to have his son Oliver checked by a doctor because he does not see his behavior as normal. Josefa makes a proposal to Leona. Leona is convinced that Columba is behind the theft of her money. Ramsés confesses that he had Dano killed. Leona confirms that Kika is not her daughter. Leona confesses to David that she is willing to reveal the whole truth to Gael because she feels desperate. Columba convinces Ana Julia to join the cheerleading squad. Leona receives an arrangement of flowers in her office and Gael becomes jealous. Leona searches Gael's computer for information that could compromise the Torrenegro family. Lola arrives with Calixto at the hotel, he spikes her drink. Leona sees that Ana Julia is being harassed and defends her.
21	"Me estoy enamorando de Leona"	20 March 2023	3.0
Ramsés humiliates Camila by forcing her to stand up from her wheelchair. Ana Julia has a confrontation with Kika and Leona takes advantage of the moment to take a sample of Ana Julia's hair to perform a DNA test. Calixto records Lola while she is asleep so he can blackmail her. David confesses to Leona that Camila kissed him, she gets jealous. Gael accepts that he is falling in love with Leona. Ramsés confesses that he is the leader of a sex trafficking ring. Ramsés finds out that Columba destroyed Oliver's stuffed animal, congratulates her for not having control over hurting her own children and kisses her.
22	"¡Ana Julia es tu hija!"	21 March 2023	3.3
Jeremías proposes to Lola to take revenge on Jacinta by taking her apartment. Leona is moved when celebrating Benjamín's birthday. Leona confirms that Ana Julia is her daughter, Consuelo asks her to be very cautious with the Torrenegro family. Columba tells Kika that now is not the time for the truth about Ana Julia to be revealed. David confesses to Jacinta that they can no longer hide the truth from Leona. Itzel reveals to Benjamín that she is in love with him. Ramsés assures Gael that his son Matias is dead to him. Josefa does not stop thinking about Apolo and when she sees Ramsés, she confronts him for what he did to Camila. David prepares a romantic evening for Leona and they make love.
23	"Yo soy tu mamá, hija"	22 March 2023	3.3
Josefa complains to Ramsés for being so indifferent to her and her family. Kika assures Ana Julia that she can't stand her. Leona tells David that it is time to start the second part of their plan. Leona asks Gael for an advance on her salary since her money was stolen and she needs it for Consuelo's treatment. Ramsés sets in motion his plan to kidnap the cheerleaders. Jeremías causes an accident to Clara. Ramsés forbids Columba to fall in love with him since their relationship is only passionate. Leona confirms that Columba is part of Ramsés' trafficking business.
24	"¡Tú las secuestraste!"	23 March 2023	3.4
Leona arrives at the place where Ramsés is holding the cheerleaders captive, she begins to record him and his accomplices in order to have evidence against him, but during a confrontation with his security, she loses her cell phone. Ana Julia informs Gael that the cheerleading squad is missing and asks Ramsés to locate the girls. Gael surprises Leona at her house and confesses to her that she became a special person, he kisses her, but she asks him not to get confused. Ana Julia asks Columba for an explanation for what happened with the cheerleaders. Leona tells David that Gael kissed her.
25	"¡Eres adoptada!"	24 March 2023	3.2
David gets jealous when he learns that Gael kissed Leona. Columba proposes to David that he become Camila's lover since Calixto has not touched her for many years. Leona is proud of Ana Julia and joins her protest. Columba advises Calixto to look for Leona and make her his mistress. Ramsés proposes to Josefa to renew their marriage vows. Jeremías reveals to Lola that Benjamín is adopted. Romeo while kissing Kika confuses her and calls her Ana Julia. Gael is sure that his father has something to do with the disappearance of the cheerleaders, he argues with him and is ready to kill him, Leona stops him. Calixto shoots David. Kika reveals to Ana Julia that she is adopted.
26	"Aquí estoy para ti"	27 March 2023	3.5
Gael confirms to Ana Julia that Camila and Calixto are not her biological parents. David manages to save himself. Ramsés gets upset with Kika for revealing the family secret. Columba slaps Kika for the mistake she made. Gael wants to reveal to Julia that he is her father. Ana Julia feels betrayed by her mother so she decides to leave the house and asks Leona to let her live with her. David shares with Jacinta that he is going to propose to Leona to confess the truth about her son. Ana Julia questions whether her birth parents are alive.
27	"¿Te quieres casar conmigo?"	28 March 2023	3.6
Leona tells Ana Julia that she is David's girlfriend. Ramsés complains Columba for revealing the truth to Kika and announces to his family that Kika is going to boarding school. David surprises Leona with an engagement ring and she accepts. Columba asks Kika to play the victim. Ana Julia vents to Teo, he tells her that he will always be there for her. Consuelo suffers a fainting spell. David invites Leona to dinner to make a confession. Lola gets Clara to sign over the rights to her apartment. Consuelo questions if Leona is really in love with David.
28	"Tu hijo… ¡es Benjamín!"	29 March 2023	3.4
Jeremías tells Leona that David has been making fun of her since he knows perfectly well who her son is. Ana Julia rebukes Gael for keeping quiet about the truth, he tells her that her birth mother died and her father was a coward. Benjamín confesses to Itzel that he fell in love with her. Ramsés provokes Columba's jealousy by assuring her that Gael has a particular interest in Leona. Leona asks David to confess the truth since Jeremías assured her that he knows where her son is, and when she learns of his deception, she slaps him. Josefa tells Ramsés that they will never be a complete family without Matias' presence. David reveals to Leona that Benjamin is her son.
29	"No quiero saber nada de ti"	30 March 2023	3.5
David explains to Leona that it was Jacinta who saved Benjamín's life by preventing him from dying during the hospital explosion. Columba seduces Gael, but he imagines that she is with Leona. Leona tells David that she no longer wants anything with him and ends their relationship. Josefa has contact with her son Matías, but he asks her not to look for him anymore since they are not family. Leona thanks Jacinta for raising Benjamín, so she is determined to confess the truth to her son.
30	"Atacar por la espalda"	31 March 2023	3.3
Ramses looks Ana Julia and upon seeing her closeness with Benjamín, he forbids her to have a relationship with him since they are from different worlds. Benjamín manages to get Ana Julia to use public transportation for the first time, but they are assaulted and he gets hurt. Ramsés asks Leona to tell him if she is in love with Gael. Leona assures David that Jeremías had the courage to tell her the truth. David fights with Jeremías when he suspects that he caused the accident to his mother. Kika questions Camila about Ana Julia's family. Ramsés asks Columba to speed up the transfer of the cheerleaders. Consuelo receives sad news about her cancer treatments. Matías asks his uncle Apolo if he regrets abandoning his mother. Josefa interrogates Leona about the business in which Columba and Calixto collaborate with Ramses and asks for her support. Jeremías denounces David and shows him the eviction order since the apartment belongs to him.
31	"¡Sáquenme de aquí!"	3 April 2023	2.9
Clara reveals that Lola forced her to sign the apartment documents. Leona is kidnapped. Lola confronts Jacinta and tells her that she already knows that Benjamín is not her brother. Calixto takes Leona by force, Ramsés, seeing that she is in danger, saves her. Leona calls Consuelo to rescue her. Gael and Camila are willing to look for their brother Matías. Ramses complains to Calixto for what he did to Leona and as punishment, he marks him with a hot iron. Leona tells Consuelo that a man tried to abuse her, but someone defended her. Leona asks David to forget his revenge against the Torrenegro family because it is not his place to be by her side.
32	"Nuestro matrimonio se acabó"	4 April 2023	3.0
Flor has a confrontation with Lola that ends with them slapping each other. Columba wants to renew her vows, but Gael opposes because their marriage is worn out. Lola is willing to continue swindling people in order not to return to the neighborhood. Jacinta reveals to Flor the truth about Benjamín. Itzel asks Benjamín if he wants to be her boyfriend, he accepts. Leona wants to hack into Columba's computer. Teo sees Romeo kissing Ana Julia. Jeremías finds Lola with Calixto, he complains to him for going out with an underage girl, but Lola assures him that Calixto can give her the life she deserves. Gael reveals to Columba that he fell in love with Leona. Columba threatens Gael with hurting Leona. Leona asks Flor for help to find the person responsible for her kidnapping and assures her that Ramsés is trafficking cheerleaders.
33	"No quiero ser la otra mujer"	5 April 2023	3.0
Gael reaffirms his feelings for Leona and asks Columba for a divorce. Jeremías puts a price on Lola. Columba asks Leona to stay away from Gael, she makes it clear that he tried to kiss her, Columba, hearing this, slaps her, but Leona slaps her back. Gael tells Leona that she is the woman he has waited for all his life and hopes she will give him a chance. Leona causes the fire alarm to go off so Teo can hack into Columba's computer. Kika finds out that Benjamín and Itzel are a couple and tries to humiliate them, but Ana Julia comes to their defense. Gael finds out that Columba is part of his father's illicit business.
34	"Estoy dispuesto a morir"	6 April 2023	2.7
Leona bursts into tears in front of Josefa and reveals that someone tried to hurt her. Gael arrives at the place where his father and Columba have the cheerleaders, but when he is recognized, a gunfight breaks out and Alcino threatens to shoot him. Leona learns that Gael is part of Ramsés' business. Ramsés manipulates Gael by assuring him that he can destroy the lives of his mother and children if the truth about his business revealed. Columba receives the divorce documents and asks Gael to think about their children. Camila seeks Ana Julia's forgiveness and confesses to her that her biological mother's name was Marena Ramos.
35	"Arrepentirse de sus pecados"	7 April 2023	2.5
Ramsés lashes out at Columba and warns her that she will pay for her mistakes with suffering. Gael informs his children that he is divorcing their mother. Columba tells Kika that her father changed her for Leona Bravo. Leona reveals to Josefa that after a budget analysis, she discovered that Columba is stealing money and proposes to take advantage of the situation to bring back Matías and her brother-in-law Apolo. Gael and his family manage to have contact with Matías. Lola confronts Calixto for hiding his true identity and threatens him, he blackmails her with revealing that she sells intimate videos. Ramsés tries to suffocate Columba.
36	"Me voy a aprovechar de Gael"	10 April 2023	3.0
Gael tries to help Kika to stop drinking, she asks him not to divorce her mother. Columba asks Ramsés not to push her out of his life and seduces him. Leona gives cooking classes to Ana Julia and Benjamín. Josefa talks to Matías and asks him to come back since she discovered a fraud in Ramsés' business. Leona asks Flor for a favor. Ramsés seeks to stop the investigation. Ana Julia tells Leona that wants to return home to her family because Camila needs her. Columba surprises Gael with a sexy swimsuit, but he rejects her. David tells Gael that he is in love with Leona, Gael confirms that David is Leona's ex-boyfriend.
37	"Voy a casarme con Gael"	11 April 2023	3.3
Gael tells to David that he is ready to win Leona's heart. Benjamín wears women's clothes to prove that clothes have no gender, Clara gets upset and thinks Itzel is changing him. Kika blames Leona for destroying her family. Leona wants Gael to fall madly in love with her to the point of marrying her. Columba insults Josefa, she is tired of her disrespect and slaps her. Gael receives good news about Camila's surgery. Kika enters the rehabilitation clinic. Ramsés gets upset when he sees that his business is bankrupt. Leona demands Jacinta to tell the truth to Benjamín, but Clara proposes to Jacinta to turn the tables on Leona so that Benjamín hates her. Leona takes advantage of her closeness with Gael to make him believe that she is in love with him.
38	"Llegó la hora de romper tu vida"	12 April 2023	3.4
Apolo, Matías and Danilo surprise the Torrenegro family with their return but Ramsés kicks them out. Columba proposes to David to join forces to prevent Gael and Leona from falling in love. Camila confesses to David that she cares about him beyond her therapies. Apollo makes his brother Ramsés angry. Apolo discovers that Josefa keeps the earrings he gave her in the past. Matías remembers the day Ramsés smashed his legs to prevent him from being a dancer. Gael provokes David's jealousy. Itzel confesses to Benjamín that she is a non-binary person. Apolo shows Ramsés documents proving that Columba is stealing money from the company.
39	"Entre la vida y la muerte"	13 April 2023	3.4
Columba threatens Gael that she will not let him see his children if he continues with the idea of divorce. Ana Julia asks Calixto to help her contact her biological father, he is determined to reveal the identity of her father. Ramsés informs Columba that Apolo discovered that she is diverting money from the company. Ramsés suffers a heart attack just before renewing his wedding vows to Josefa. Consuelo shares with her family the decision she made about her body. Ramsés is willing to renew his vows to prove that Josefa's place is with him and not with anyone else. David asks Leona not to fall in love with Gael, he steals a kiss, but Leona slaps him.
40	"Remueves muchas cosas en mi corazón"	14 April 2023	3.2
Ramsés is certain that Apolo was to blame for his heart attack. Lola falls for Calixto's blackmail. Ana Julia tells Camila that she is Romeo's girlfriend, Camila advises her to be careful. Columba gets into Ramsés' bed. Gael confesses to Leona that he had two children with the great love of his life and reveals that if his son were alive, he would be in danger. Gael asks Leona to dance and when he takes her home, he steals a kiss. Itzel tells Leona that Teo did something wrong on the donation page he made to her mother. Leona confesses to Consuelo that she felt uncomfortable when Gael kissed her, but she thinks it is not the time to tell the truth because if her identity is discovered, everyone would be in danger.
41	"Quiero que acabes con Leona Bravo"	17 April 2023	3.2
Clara complains to Leona for causing conflict with her family, Leona puts a stop to her. Columba arrives at the neighborhood to complain to Leona for messing with Gael, Itzel sees what is happening and throws a bucket of cold water on her. Jeremías offers Columba his help to get rid of Leona. Ramsés dreams that Matias breaks his legs. Leona tells David that she cannot reveal the truth to her children until she subdues Ramsés and Gael. Columba asks Jeremías to kill Leona. Clara is very afraid that Benjamín will discover his origin. Jeremias blackmails Leona with revealing that she is Marena Ramos. Gael learns that Columba is laundering money from the company. Ana Julia asks Gael to tell her who Marena Ramos is.
42	"No vas a ser feliz con nadie"	18 April 2023	3.1
Leona consoles Benjamín after he had an argument with his father. Apolo asks Josefa to open her eyes and let herself be carried away by what she feels, Ramsés listens and confronts him. Columba threatens Gael with making his life miserable and warns him that her first blow will be to take his children. Teo is investigated for cyber fraud. Kika humiliates Leona in front of the whole school. Leona tries to explain to Ana Julia how she fell in love with Gael, but Ana Julia rejects their relationship. Consuelo questions Teo about the funds on his page, he accepts that he committed a crime and assures her that he did it for her. Ramsés' security checks Calixto's car. Ramsés observes Columba while she bathes.
43	"¿Y si estás embarazada?"	19 April 2023	3.4
Columba asks Ramsés for help in order to hurt Gael. David, seeing that he lost Leona, makes an alliance with Columba. Flor arrives with her mother at the bar where Silvano summoned her and discovers that she is actually Silvana. Gael refuses to let Columba take his children, but Ramses supports her decision. Leona faints when she learns that Teo will be arrested. David questions Leona if she is pregnant, she confirms that her period is late. Teo is sent to the police station, Leona and David try to prevent this from happening.
44	"Me emocionaba la idea de ser mamá"	20 April 2023	3.3
Ramsés complains to Calixto for having one of Kika's friends as a lover and suspects that he is betraying him. Flor confronts Silvano for hiding his true identity. Ramsés confesses to Josefa that he has been jealous since Apolo's arrival. Columba tries to turn Oliver against Leona. Faced with the possibility of being pregnant, Leona is worried that her revenge against the Torrenegro could be postponed. David warns Gael that if Leona is expecting his child, he will have to walk away from her life. Jeremías informs Columba that his plan to kill Leona has already begun. Leona confirms that she is not pregnant.
45	"Siento que me muero"	21 April 2023	3.3
Gael is filled with feelings and reveals to Leona, Ana Julia and Benjamín that he could have had a happy family. Leona takes advantage of the fact that they are all together to announce that she is not expecting a baby. Gael kisses Leona, but she only thinks of David. Jeremías causes a gas leak in Leona's apartment. Clara confesses to Jacinta that she already knew Silvano's secret. Leona, Consuelo and Itzel are intoxicated, David arrives to save them; however, Itzel faints. Leona asks David to take Ana Julia and Benjamín to the hospital because she needs to tell them the truth.
46	"¡Cásate conmigo!"	24 April 2023	3.1
Columba assures Jeremías that he will only be paid if Leona dies. Jacinta asks David to hide his hatred when he is in front of Gael. Benjamín confesses to Ana Julia that he considers her part of his family. Gael asks Leona to marry him and she accepts. David learns that Leona accepted Gael's marriage proposal and rebukes her for faking love she doesn't feel. Ramsés warns Columba that if she betrays him he is capable of killing her. Leona meets with Ana Julia and Benjamín to confess that she is their biological mother, but as she tries to talk, she decides to be seen as their best friend. Gael asks Columba to stop manipulating him with his children and reveals his plans with Leona.
47	"Vamos a impedir esa boda"	25 April 2023	3.3
Ana Julia and Benjamín offer Leona their help so she can find her children. Ramsés sees Benjamín in his house and insults him. Gael informs Columba that he is going to marry Leona. Teo returns home to his family. Camila begins to take her first steps. Ramsés destroys Apolo's apartment. David, upon hearing Camila's confession of her feelings, tells her that he loves another woman. Columba and David agree to prevent Leona's wedding with Gael.
48	"Leona Bravo de Torrenegro"	26 April 2023	3.6
Leona gets fed up with Columba's threats and lets her know that she will not stand by and watch her endanger her family. During the proposal, Calixto approaches Leona to congratulate her and she realizes that he is the man who almost raped her. Seeing herself as a Torrenegro, Leona warns Ramsés that one day she will show him who she really is. Narvi calls Leona to let her know that he found out who she really is and warns her that he has Adrian in his possession.
49	"¿Estás dispuesto a ser nuestro aliado?"	27 April 2023	3.6
Narvi throws David into the pool with the intention of killing him, Leona confronts Narvi and he slips by the pool. Ramsés asks Columba to investigate if Apolo and Josefa are lovers. Leona confirms to David that Narvi is dead. Leona and David want to get rid of Narvi's body, but they fear Ramsés' reaction. Leona reveals to Apolo her real name and confesses that Ramsés killed her entire family. Columba shows the evidence of the kiss between Josefa and Apolo, Ramsés asks her to kill him. Apolo agrees to be Leona's accomplice. Matías denounces Ramsés for tax evasion.
50	"Quiero ser tu cómplice"	28 April 2023	3.4
Flor contacts Ramsés to inform him that Narvi is dead. Calixto asks Lola to pack because she is going with him to London. Gael celebrates that Camila managed to stand up and takes the opportunity to confess to her that their father is a murderer and trafficker of women. Teo surprises Ana Julia with a kiss. Leona informs Ramsés that she was with Narvi when he died and confirms with a video that she already knows that he is a trafficker of women. Leona confesses to Ramsés that she does not love Gael, but wishes to be a Torrenegero, he is not very convinced of her word. Apolo informs Matias that Ramsés and Gael have a trafficking business. Leona and Apolo suffer an attack in an elevator.
51	"Nos vamos a casar en este momento"	1 May 2023	3.3
Itzel reveals to Ana Julia that she is non-binary, Kika listens to her, mocks her, but Ana Julia slaps her. Apolo blames Ramsés for the attack he suffered. Leona assures Gael that it was Columba who was responsible for the accident as she received a call just before getting on the elevator. Gael takes Leona to choose her wedding dress. Jacinta and David manage to track down Lola's whereabouts and David beats the man who was trying to take Lola. Consuelo confronts Romeo for hitting Teo. Ana Julia breaks up with Romeo. David tries to convince Lola to tell him the name of the person she was trying to leave the country with. Consuelo discovers that she went viral for attacking Romeo. Leona and Gael arrive at the Torrenegro house dressed as bride and groom ready to get married.
52	"Los declaro marido y mujer"	2 May 2023	3.8
Ramsés stops Columba from opposing Gael's wedding and tells her that Leona already knows about the business they are in. Kika throws a glass of wine at Leona's wedding dress. Josefa lends Leona the wedding dress she married Ramsés in. David arrives at the wedding and objects, making it clear that he still loves Leona. Gael kicks David out of the wedding, David assures him that Leona is just using him and they come to blows. Leona and Gael are declared husband and wife. Silvano is humiliated by Jeremías and forbids him to come back for his daughter and granddaughter. Teo declares his love for Ana Julia. Ramsés assures Leona that Gael is his victim since he is not involved in his business because he is a weak man, so she will be his accomplice to break his heart.
53	"Me cansé de rogarte"	3 May 2023	3.4
Camila tells Leona that she plans to divorce Calixto to win David's love. Benjamín learns that Gael had a son. Lola complains to Calixto for leaving her at the hotel and questions him about whether he was trying to sell her into the trafficking business. Columba enters Gael's bedroom and places a poisonous spider on his bed. Leona tells Consuelo that she is confused after learning that Gael is not part of Ramsés' business. Leona tells David that Gael is not part of his father's business, he reproaches her for her actions and asks her to leave his house. Ana Julia wants to know who Mariana Ramos was in their lives. Clara sees Leona kissing Gael in her own house and rebukes her for all the damage she has caused David and ends up slapping her. Columba puts drops in David's drink.
54	"No puedo hacer el amor contigo"	4 May 2023	3.6
Columba starts kissing David, he imagines he is with Leona. Leona refuses to be intimate with Gael and discovers that there is a tarantula in the bed. Columba boasts to Leona that she spent the night with David. Lola reveals to Benjamín that he is not her brother. Leona is determined to let Benjamín know that she is his biological mother, Jacinta pleads with Lola to keep the secret. Camila reveals to Ana Julia and Josefa that she wants to divorce Calixto. Gael confronts Columba for trying to kill Leona. Ramsés threatens Leona with wiping out her entire family if she betrays him. Jeremías reveals to Benjamín that his birth mother is Leona Bravo.
55	"Tu verdadero padre es Gael Torrenegro"	5 May 2023	3.3
Leona learns that she will have to team up with Columba and Calixto for Ramsés' business. Jeremías advises Benjamín to confront his biological mother for hiding the truth from him. Gael reveals to Josefa that his father is involved in human trafficking. Benjamín confronts Jacinta and David for hiding the truth from him. Leona confronts Calixto and assures him that she will prove that he tried to abuse her. Josefa reveals to Gael that she has been in love with Apolo all her life. Josefa tells Apolo that she is willing to fight for their love. Benjamín surprises Leona with a hug.
56	"¡Leona es Marena Ramos!"	8 May 2023	3.5
Calixto breaks up with Lola and assures her that it is to protect her. The judge rules in Clara's favor so she will not lose her apartment. Leona tells Apolo that now is not the time to tell Gael the truth because he might not forgive her. Gael defends Benjamín from Ramsés' humiliation. Benjamín complains to Itzel for hiding from him that she knew the truth about his biological mother. David, knowing that Leona could be in danger, reveals to Gael that she is really Marena Ramos. Gael refuses to believe that Leona is actually Marena Ramos. Camila tries to gain Marco's trust to help her brother. Gael does not fall for Jeremias' blackmail and tells him that he already knows Leona's true identity and asks him to leave her alone. Ana Julia receives death threats. Consuelo begs Leona to take care of her family if she dies. Romeo takes Kika by force. Josefa slaps Ramsés when she discovers the type of person she married.
57	"Ya sé que eres Marena Ramos"	9 May 2023	3.7
David asks Benjamín not to judge his family since they hid the truth about his origin to save his life. Leona kicks Columba out of the Torrenegro house and asks Gael to give her a better position in the company. Gael wants to know what Leona is up to since there are many secrets between them. Josefa supports Leona's new rules and assures her that she wants to work with her, since Columba always blocked her. Ramsés asks Leona to keep Josefa under control and to concentrate on the mission he imposed on her as he needs results. Gael reveals to Leona that he already knows she is Marena Ramos.
58	"Te amo más que nunca"	10 May 2023	3.1
Leona complains to Gael for all the pain he has caused her, he asks her to understand that he is a victim of her father. Gael swears to Leona that he will protect her from his father's evil since he has not stopped loving her. David prevails against Ramsés' authority. Leona shares with Gael that her son, Benjamín, is alive. Columba confirms to Kika that Ana Julia is her half-sister. Ramsés subdues David when he sees him with Camila and kicks him out of the house. Leona reveals to Gael that Apolo and Matías also already know her true identity. Josefa comes to David's defense and asks Ramsés to kick Calixto out of the house because he has only offended Camila. Gael wants to win back Leona's love.
59	"No me vas a quitar a mi hija"	11 May 2023	3.7
Romeo discovers that Jacinta is Lola's mother, he blackmails her but she slaps him. Ramsés tells Calixto that he has no more use for him as a son-in-law, so he will support his daughter in getting a divorce. Calixto asks Jeremías to help him kill Ramsés. Gael reveals to Camila that Marena Ramos is alive. Leona confronts David for telling Gael her true identity and assures him that they must now trust Gael. David confesses to Leona that he is willing to give himself a chance with Camila. Ramsés and Columba sleep in Josefa's bed. Leona invites her children to dinner and reveals to Consuelo that Gael already knows her true identity. Camila tells Leona that she will not allow her to take away Ana Julia's love from her.
60	"Yo soy su mamá"	12 May 2023	3.4
Ramsés makes Ana Julia believe that her father abandoned her. Leona thanks Camila for educating her daughter, but she needs to confess the truth. Josefa begs Camila to support Leona. Josefa finds Columba's bracelet in her bed and smells her perfume in the sheets. Leona meets Ana Julia and Benjamín in a planetarium to confesses that she is their mother. Ana Julia complains to Leona for having abandoned them, but she assures her that Ramsés was to blame. Columba sends an anonymous message to Josefa to alert her about Ramsés' infidelity.
61	"No me digas hija"	15 May 2023	3.7
Leona asks Benjamín and Ana Julia not to reveal the truth as she fears for her life. Ana Julia receives a message informing her that Gael Torrenegro is her father. Lola asks Calixto to tell his family that they are in a relationship. Ramsés confronts Calixto after seeing him kissing Lola and reveals to Camila that her husband is cheating on her with an underage girl. Benjamín lets Leona know that he does not want Gael in his life. Kika reveals to Columba that Romeo abused her, Columba doesn't believe her and assures her that it was her fault because they were both drunk. Ana Julia confronts Gael and calls him a coward, he tries to explain to her the reasons why he had to keep silent. Josefa suspects that Columba is Ramsés' mistress. Calixto reveals to Camila that it was him who caused her accident on the horse.
62	"Vas a ser la dueña de todo"	16 May 2023	3.8
Kika reveals to Oliver that Gael is also Ana Julia's father. Matías forgives Gael. Calixto reveals Ramsés' business to Lola. Camila blames Leona for destroying everything in her path, Gael comes to his Leona's defense and informs them that when he can recover the accounts that his father put in his name, Leona will be the owner of everything. Josefa confirms that Columba and Ramsés are lovers. Apolo reiterates his love to Josefa in front of Ramsés, Josefa accepts that she has never stopped loving him. Columba tries to justify her infidelity, but Josefa assures her that she will pay for it. David reveals his true identity to Camila and she confesses that Calixto is having an affair with Lola. Ramsés learns that he is wanted by Interpol and soon his accounts will be frozen.
63	"Ya no eres nada para mí"	17 May 2023	3.7
Ana Julia reveals to Kika that Ramsés is a murderer. Gael, upon learning of Columba's infidelity, is determined to kick her out of the house. David finds Calixto kissing Lola, separates them and starts to fight with him, Jeremías tries to hurt David, and Lola threatens to hurt herself. David manages to convince Lola to leave with him. David speaks well of Leona to Ana Julia and begs her to give her a chance. Camila tries to kick Columba out the house, but Columba humiliates her by taking away her walker. Josefa reveals in front of Kika and Ana Julia that Ramsés and Columba are lovers. Ana Julia despises her grandfather after learning that he is a human trafficker, Ramsés warns his family that no one can bring him down. Apolo reveals more of Ramsés' secrets.
64	"Tiren a matar"	18 May 2023	3.2
Consuelo looks in the mirror after her surgery and bursts into tears. Josefa argues with Columba and throws her belongings out the window. Teo subdues Romeo for publishing an image of his mother in the hospital and threatens to hurt him if he refuses to apologize. Ana Julia is determined to emancipate and get rid of the Torrenegro name. Benjamín tries to help Lola to come to her senses and not leave the house. Camila and Leona fight over what is best for Ana Julia. Columba surprises the Torrenegro family by revealing that she is pregnant. Jacinta assures Calixto that she has already filed a lawsuit for messing with a minor, he and Jeremías threaten to hurt David. Jeremías asks Jacinta to get back together with him and in exchange, he will get Lola to stay away from Calixto. Columba tells Leona that the child she is expecting may be David's.
65	"No voy a tener piedad de él"	19 May 2023	3.4
Columba confirms to Ana Julia that she always hated her for being Marena's daughter. Kika rejects her mother. Calixto confronts Ramsés and threatens to publish a video where he confirms all his bad business dealings. Leona signs the document that accredits her as the majority shareholder of Torrenegro brewery. Columba interrupts Leona's presentation, but Leona humiliates her in front of all the guests. Clara accepts that she caused Silvano to walk away from Flor. Columba struggles with Oliver and causes an accident. Teo asks Ana Julia to be his girlfriend. Leona gets ready for the operation against Ramsés.
66	"Estás cavando la tumba de los demás"	22 May 2023	3.5
Josefa reveals to Apolo that she divorced Ramsés. Leona complains to David for sleeping with Columba. Leona prepares herself and Flor to confront Ramsés, but Clara blames Leona for wanting to kill her granddaughter and slaps her. David tries to stop Leona from being part of the operation against Ramsés. Ana Julia lets Camila know that she is going to live with Benjamín's family. Kika reveals to Gael that Romeo abused her, he assures her that he will take care of sending him to jail and apologizes to her for his absence. Consuelo informs her family that she is in remission. Romeo is willing to collaborate in Ramsés' human trafficking business since he believes he is able to recruit women.
67	"Hasta nunca, Marena Ramos"	23 May 2023	4.1
Ana Julia complains to her family for not denouncing Ramsés as a human trafficker. Consuelo and Cristobal, upon learning that Itzel defines herself as non-binary, support her. Leona gets ready for the operation against Ramsés and Gael asks her to take care of herself. Columba arrives at her appointment with Leona to meet the recruited women, but Leona is worried that Ramsés has not arrived. Gael confronts Romeo about what he did to Kika. Leona, seeing that Flor's life is in danger, points a gun at Ramsés and reveals that she is Marena Ramos. Leona assures Ramsés that he has no escape, he slaps her and shoots Flor, Apolo and David enter to defend her, but are threatened. Apolo asks Ramsés to surrender, he takes Leona hostage and shoots Apolo.
68	"Un hombre bueno está muerto"	24 May 2023	3.6
Kika files a complaint against Romeo for abusing her. Camila assures Clara that she loves David, she advises her to fight for her son. Calixto takes Ramsés and Columba hostage. Clara discovers that Lola publishes adult content. Apolo dies in the arms of Josefa. Calixto, seeing that he has Ramsés in his hands, tells him that he is considering selling Ana Julia. Leona blames herself for Apolo's death. Camila blames Leona for her uncle's death and questions her about how she plans to repair the damage she is causing her mother.
69	"Olvidarán lo que es tener paz"	25 May 2023	3.1
Josefa blames Leona for Apolo's death, she apologizes for what happened. Kika begs Ana Julia to return home. Josefa gathers the whole family to say goodbye to Apolo, Ramses takes advantage of the moment to send a video and make his threats evident. Lola agrees to leave with Calixto despite Clara and Benjamín's pleas. Silvano asks Flor for a chance, but she assures him that there can be nothing but friendship for the sake of their daughter. Ana Julia lets Josefa know that she will confront Ramsés, but Josefa forbids her. Romeo makes it known that Lola sells her body and is a virtual star. Camila tells David that she is divorced and kisses him. Josefa receives a call from Ramsés.
70	"Tu vida está en mis manos"	26 May 2023	3.6
David assures Camila that he is willing to their relationship a chance. Kika apologizes to Ana Julia for how badly she behaved with her. Camila tries to make Leona jealous by holding David's hand and asks her not to steal her place as Josefa's daughter. David proposes to Gael to ally with him to finish with Ramsés. Ramsés assures Josefa that he was hurt by her betrayal, she reproaches him for his indifference and infidelity. Lola says goodbye to her family. Josefa begins to feel sick while she is with Ramsés, he reveals to her that he provoked a chemical reaction, she falls into his arms and seemingly dies, he asks for her forgiveness. Leona reveals to Kika that she is Marena Ramos, her father's great love.
71	"Pagar con la misma moneda"	29 May 2023	3.8
Ramsés contacts Leona and threatens to harm Josefa if she refuses to return all the money she took from him. Ana Julia promises that if her grandmother returns alive to the house, she will keep the Torrenegro name. Leona returns the other part of the money to Ramsés so that Josefa will be well. Romeo tries to seduce Columba. Josefa returns home and tells Leona that she should not have confronted Ramsés. Ana Julia tells her grandfather that he is a despicable being and the love she felt for him turned into hatred, Ramsés begs her not to reject him, she asks him to turn himself in to the authorities. Columba slaps Romeo when she learns that he always saw Kika as second fiddle and beats him. Ana Julia asks Ramsés to apologize to Leona for destroying her life.
72	"¿Te volverías a casar conmigo?"	30 May 2023	3.7
Ana Julia returns home and reveals to Leona and Gael that she met with Ramsés. Silvano explains to Lily what it is like to be a drag queen. Itzel tells Benjamín that she is willing to be with him for her first time. Ana Julia finally accepts Leona as her mom. Columba begins to bleed and fears losing her baby. Ana Julia and Kika with the help of their classmates protest at school to expose Romeo's abuse. Gael surprises Leona with a romantic breakfast. Kika apologizes to Itzel and Teo for having judged them without giving herself a chance to get to know them. Romeo is expelled from school for the crime he committed. Ramsés finds out that his doctor sold out to Calixto. Gael asks Leona to remarry him. Lola prepares to undergo her cosmetic surgery. Columba learns that her pregnancy is high risk.
73	"Amar a dos hombres al mismo tiempo"	31 May 2023	3.7
Ramsés suspects that the child Columba is expecting may also be David's, so he plans to do a paternity test. Leona and Ana Julia teach Benjamín to swim. To ease the tension with Ramsés, Romeo reveals to him that his other grandson is Benjamín. Lola undergoes breast surgery, but the doctor warns Calixto that it is high risk. Leona begs Ana Julia to give her dad a second chance. Benjamín reproaches Gael for not defending his mother when the hospital was burning. Leona confesses to Consuelo that she is confused about Gael and David. Ramsés tells Columba that he saw in Ana Julia everything he expected from his children and that when he crossed eyes with her granddaughter, she reflected his sister when she was a child.
74	"¿Quieres casarte conmigo?"	1 June 2023	3.6
Ana Julia bursts into tears when she sees the video that Gael dedicated to her, but she is not ready to forgive him. Leona prevents Camila from drowning after she decides to enter the pool. Columba asks David to keep the secret that they were together, otherwise her life would be in danger. Gael confronts Orlando and tells him that he will send Romeo to jail for what he did to Kika. Columba, knowing that Benjamín is Ramsés' grandson, advises him to harm him in order to hurt Leona. Gael proposes to Leona to escape to the beach for a few days, she imagines a romantic moment with him. Lola manages to save her life. Ramsés confronts Benjamín and assures him that he is a real Torrenegro, Benjamín rejects him and makes evident the hatred he feels for him. Camila surprises David by proposing to him.
75	"Escogiste el camino del dolor"	2 June 2023	3.4
Itzel defends Benjamín from Ramsés, she tries to expose him on social media, but he manages to escape. Leona prepares the dress for Ana Julia's party, and when she gives it to her Ana Julia calls her mom for the first time. David apologizes to Camila and cancels his engagement to her. Gael is devastated to learn of Ana Julia's rejection. Gael gives Leona a painting of her family. David reveals to Leona that he has called off his engagement to Camila. Ana Julia asks Gael to stay at her birthday party and manages to forgive him, but an armed squad arrives to ruin the family's moment.
76	"No me importa morir por mi hija"	5 June 2023	3.7
Calixto shoots Gael in order to take Ana Julia away from her party. Ramsés learns what happened to Ana Julia and wants Calixto's head, but Calixto calls him to threaten to hurt her. Lola confronts Calixto when she learns what he is doing to Ana Julia. Leona records a video to help her locate Ana Julia and sends a message to Ramsés. Columba takes revenge on Leona by sending Benjamín a gift that has a bomb. Ramses feels betrayed by Columba so he pushes her, she begins to bleed and the doctor confirms that she lost her baby. Calixto calls Camila and asks her to give him Leona in exchange for Ana Julia. Calixto sells Ana Julia to Orlando. Gael confirms that it was Columba who sent the gift to Benjamín. Orlando takes Ana Julia to his house where she meets Daphne, a girl who is being searched by her relatives.
77	"Un beso de despedida"	6 June 2023	3.8
Leona, knowing that Calixto sold Ana Julia, shoots him, while Ramsés tortures him, but feeling that Leona does not trust him, he threatens her. Flor stops Jeremías and he confesses Ana Julia's whereabouts. Benjamín learns that he lost sight in his right eye. Romeo tries to rape Ana Julia but Daphne defends her and when they try to escape they are caught by Orlando. Gael asks Benjamín to give him a chance as a father. Lola regrets her bad decisions. Ramsés kills Orlando. Ramsés seeks to make Calixto suffer for what he did to Camila and Ana Julia. Jacinta learns that Lola was arrested for being Calixto's accomplice. Ana Julia and Kika learn of Orlando and Romeo's death. Leona tells Gael that she has already forgiven him, but she cannot forget that thanks to his silence, many women were victims of his father's business and decides to end their relationship.
78	"Queda arrestado señor Torrenegro"	7 June 2023	3.8
Gael informs his family that he plans to turn himself in to the authorities for being Ramsés' accomplice, Leona asks him to reconsider his decision. Lola apologizes to her mother for all the damage she caused her. Calixto wakes up and discovers that he has lost all his limbs. Ana Julia tells Gael that she is heartbroken over his decision, but surprises him by calling him dad for the first time. Gael says goodbye to his family and turns himself in to the authorities. Columba, dressed as a nun, threatens Leona with a gun and assures her that her end has come. Gael is transferred to prison.
79	"¡Sean felices!"	8 June 2023	3.8
Leona takes advantage of Columba's carelessness to counterattack her, but she manages to escape when the police arrest Leona. Ramsés slaps Columba for her betrayal. Gael is beaten in jail for being the son of a criminal. Ramsés asks Columba to prove her loyalty by killing Calixto. Benjamín breaks down in tears upon being reunited with his family. Columba asks Ramsés to allow her to communicate with her children, she apologizes to them and swears to love them forever. Gael begs Leona to give herself a second chance with David. Ramsés kills Columba by burning her in a tanning bed. Gael asks David to fight for Leona's love and make her happy. Camila apologizes to Leona and assures her that she never thought of taking Ana Julia's love away from her. Benjamín forgives his father Gael and calls him dad for the first time.
80	"No necesito un hombre para ser feliz"	9 June 2023	4.0
Jeremías is beaten in jail and Gael comes to his defense. Clara apologizes to Leona for having judged her. Benjamín receives the news that he has a cornea donor. Leona agrees to marry David. After a successful surgery, Benjamín regains his vision. Ramsés orders for Gael to be killed. Leona arrives at the church ready to marry David, but changes her mind when she learns that he was Columba's accomplice in trying to separate her from Gael. Gael surprises everyone by showing up at the wedding, but Leona also turns him down and assures him that she only needs her children to be happy. Gael comes to blows with Ramsés. Leona and David manage to get to safety the young women who were about to be sold. Leona shoots Ramsés and swears to him that he will pay for killing her family, he ends up in a hospital with an unknown illness. Leona meets with David and Gael to thank them for their love and tells them that she is starting a new life with her children by her side.

== Reception ==
=== Ratings ===
Viewership and ratings per season of El amor invencible
Season	Timeslot (CT)	Episodes	First aired		Last aired		Avg. viewers (millions)
Season	Timeslot (CT)	Episodes	Date	Viewers (millions)	Date	Viewers (millions)	Avg. viewers (millions)
1	Mon–Fri 9:30 p.m.	80	20 February 2023	3.9	9 June 2023	4.0	3.48

=== Awards and nominations ===
Year	Award	Category	Nominated	Result	Ref
2023	Produ Awards	Best Supporting Actor - Superseries or Telenovela	Víctor González	Nominated	
2023	Produ Awards	Best Directing - Superseries or Telenovela	Eric Morales, Bonnie Cartas and Carlos Alcázar	Nominated	
2023	Produ Awards	Best Fiction Producer - Superseries or Telenovela	Juan Osorio	Nominated	
2023	Produ Awards	Best Screenplay - Superseries or Telenovela	Hugo Moreno Cano, Martha Jurado, Marisela Rodríguez, Juan Osorio, Claudia Vázquez, Lilian Gatica, and Eduardo Rubio	Nominated	
2024	Premios Juventud	They Make Me Fall In Love	Angelique Boyer & Daniel Elbittar	Won	
