= List of programs broadcast by América Televisión =

América Televisión logo since 2016

This is a list of television programs currently airing (in premiere or reruns), scheduled to air, or previously aired on América Televisión, a Peruvian channel.

== Current programming ==
Title	Premiere date	Reference
Telenovelas
La vida que me robaste	September 8, 2026	
Destilando amor	May 27, 2026	
Los hilos del pasado	October 15, 2026	
Drama series
La rosa de Guadalupe	June 9, 2008	
Amores que matan	November 23, 2024	
Solamente Milagros	January 4, 2025	
Como dice el dicho	June 6, 2026	
Comedy
Al fondo hay sitio	August 13, 2025 (First stage)	
Al fondo hay sitio	March 16, 2026 (Season 13)	
El Chavo del Ocho	June 17, 2025	
El Chapulín Colorado	June 21, 2025	
Talk/reality shows
Veredicto final	January 3, 2026	
Esto ya es personal	February 28, 2026	

== Former programming ==
=== Acquired programming ===
==== Telenovelas ====
Title	Transmission date	Fact	Reference
A que no me dejas	November 2, 2015 - May 10, 2016	Premiere	
Abismo de pasión	March 5 - October 19, 2012	Premiere	
Al diablo con los guapos	October 22, 2007 - June 30, 2008	Premiere	
Al final del arco iris	February 2 - June 1, 1983	Premiere	
Alborada	March 27 - August 7, 2006	Premiere	
Alma de hierro	September 3, 2008 - November 13, 2009	Premiere	
Amanecer	November 20, 2025 - March 30, 2026	Premiere	
Amar otra vez	March 15 - August 27, 2004	Premiere	
Amar otra vez	November 5, 2012 - August 30, 2013	Repetition	
Amar sin límites	January 16 - July 17, 2007	Premiere	
Amarte es mi pecado	February 9 - June 21, 2004	Premiere	
Amarte es mi pecado	September 16 - December 3, 2024	Repetition	
Amor amargo	March 12 - July 9, 2025	Premiere	
Amor bravío	June 5, 2012 - February 1, 2013	Premiere	
Amor de barrio	July 13 - December 16, 2015	Premiere	
Amor prohibido	June 2 - October 17, 1980	Premiere	
Amor Real	August 14, 2003 - February 6, 2004	Premiere	
Amor sin maquillaje	January 28 - February 22, 2008	Premiere	
Amorcito corazón	September 17, 2012 - Abril 30, 2013	Premiere	
Amores con trampa	July 21, 2015 - January 22, 2016	Premiere	
Amores de mercado	January 17 - July 9, 2007	Premiere	
Amores verdaderos	October 22, 2012 - July 11, 2013	Premiere	
Apuesta por un amor	February 3 - August 11, 2005	Premiere	
Apuesta por un amor	October 31, 2011 - June 4, 2012	Repetition	
Atrévete a Soñar	September 3, 2009 - May 7, 2010	Premiere	
Bajo la misma piel	May 26 - September 12, 2003	Premiere	
Barata de primavera	September 7, 1981 - April 8, 1982	Premiere	
Barrera de amor	May 2 - August 25, 2006	Premiere	
Bianca Vidal	May 23 - December 2, 1983	Premiere	
Brousko	June 23 - December 30, 2016	Premiere	
Cachito de cielo	October 1, 2012 - March 15, 2013	Premiere	
Caer en tentación	February 19 - July 23, 2018	Premiere	
Camaleones	September 13, 2010 - March 25, 2011	Premiere	
Chispita	May 17, 1983 - February 17, 1984	Premiere	
Cita a ciegas	November 25, 2019 - March 2, 2020	Premiere	
Código postal	April 9, 2007 - January 10, 2008	Premiere	
Colorina	June 16, 1980 - June 12, 1981	Premiere	
Colorina	May 14 - December 5, 1984	Repetition	
Como tú no hay 2	December 23, 2020 - April 23, 2021	Premiere	
Contra viento y marea	May 16 - November 11, 2005	Premiere	
Contra viento y marea	November 3, 2011 - May 4, 2012	Repetition	
Corazón de oro	June 10 - October 14, 2026	Premiere	
Corazón indomable	February 4 - September 19, 2014	Premiere	
Corazón indomable	February 5 - September 13, 2024	Repetition	
Corazón salvaje (1977 TV series)	January 29 - May 31, 1979	Premiere	
Corazón salvaje	November 16, 2009 - May 27, 2010	Premiere	
Corazón salvaje	August 28 - November 29, 2017	Repetition	
Corazones al límite	June 6 - December 23, 2005	Premiere	
Cuando los hijos se van	August 1 - November 15, 1983	Premiere	
Cuando me enamoro	December 13, 2010 - August 24, 2011	Premiere	
Cuidado con el angel	December 1, 2008 - September 2, 2009	Premiere	
De que te quiero, te quiero	September 17, 2013 - June 19, 2014	Premiere	
Déjame vivir	January 17 - May 20, 1983	Premiere	
Destilando amor	August 6, 2007 - April 9, 2008	Premiere	
Destilando amor	September 28, 2011 - June 29, 2012	Repetition	
Destilando amor	July 13, 2023 - February 2, 2024	Repetition	
Doménica Montero	November 20, 1978 - January 26, 1979	Premiere	
Doménica Montero	March 31 - June 9, 2026	Premiere	
Dos hogares	February 15 - September 28, 2012	Premiere	
Duelo de Pasiones	February 1 - August 2, 2007	Premiere	
El amor ajeno	January 2 - June 1, 1984	Premiere	
El amor invencible	July 4 - October 24, 2023	Premiere	
El amor no tiene precio	September 16, 2005 - October 13, 2006	Premiere	
El amor no tiene receta	May 23 - October 4, 2024	Premiere	
El color de la pasión	July 2 - December 19, 2014	Premiere	
El maleficio	December 5, 1983 - July 18, 1984	Premiere	
El maleficio (2023 TV series)	January 29 - May 22, 2024	Premiere	
El Manantial	March 18 - July 29, 2002	Premiere	
El Manantial	October 7, 2010 - February 11, 2011	Repetition	
En tierras salvajes	September 18 - December 1, 2017	Premiere	
Enamorándome de Ramón	July 3 - September 15, 2017	Premiere	
Espejismo	January 15 - May 7, 1982	Premiere	
Fuego ardiente	April 26 - August 27, 2021	Premiere	
Fuego en la sangre	April 2, 2008 - January 22, 2009	Premiere	
Fuego en la sangre	January 24 - November 2, 2012	Repetition	
Fuego en la sangre	June 1 - September 30, 2016	Repetition	
Gabriel y Gabriela	March 2 - May 30, 1983	Premiere	
Guadalupe (Mexican TV series)	October 3, 1984 - March 18, 1985	Premiere	
Ha llegado una intrusa	October 3, 1983 - February 28, 1984	Premiere	
Hasta que el dinero nos separe	March 28, 2011 - February 14, 2012	Premiere	
Hatırla Sevgili	September 21 - October 21, 2020	Premiere	
Heridas de amor	August 2, 2006 - February 6, 2007	Premiere	
Hoy voy a cambiar	November 7 - December 5, 2017	Premiere	
Inocente de ti	March 16 - September 21, 2005	Premiere	
Juegos del destino	May 10 - August 31, 1982	Premiere	
Juro Que Te Amo	October 7, 2008 - April 24, 2009	Premiere	
La desalmada	October 4, 2021 - February 7, 2022	Premiere	
La doble vida de Estela Carrillo	July 4 - August 25, 2017	Premiere	
La esposa virgen	August 8 - November 4, 2005	Premiere	
La fea más bella	August 28, 2006 - August 31, 2007	Premiere	
La fiera (Mexican TV series)	June 18, 1984 - February 18, 1985	Premiere	
La fuerza del destino	May 23 - November 11, 2011	Premiere	
La Gata	October 30, 2014 - April 24, 2015	Premiere	
La Gata	November 5, 2018 - April 26, 2019	Repetition	
La herencia	June 23 - September 16, 2022	Premiere	
La jaula de oro	June 16 - October 7, 1997	Premiere	
La jaula de oro	July 12 - October 6, 2010	Repetition	
La jefa del campeón	July 24 - October 23, 2018	Premiere	
La madrastra(2005 TV series)	November 7, 2005 - May 1, 2006	Premiere	
La madrastra(2005 TV series)	January 1 - March 20, 2008	Repetition	
La madrastra(2005 TV series)	September 8, 2014 - February 20, 2015	Repetition	
La madrastra	September 19 - November 25, 2022	Premiere	
La Malquerida	August 21, 2014 - February 11, 2015	Premiere	
La mujer del Vendaval	March 18 - September 27, 2013	Premiere	
La mujer en el espejo	June 19, 2006 - January 22, 2007	Premiere	
La mujer en el espejo	September 17, 2007 - February 1, 2008	Repetition	
La Otra	June 10 - October 17, 2002	Premiere	
La Otra	November 4, 2005 - March 14, 2006	Repetition	
La Otra	August 5 - December 7, 2010	Repetition	
La que no podía amar	January 11 - August 24, 2012	Premiere	
La reina soy yo	January 22 - May 15, 2020	Premiere	
La sombra del pasado	February 6 - July 14, 2015	Premiere	
La Tempestad	July 9 - November 29, 2013	Premiere	
La venganza (1977 TV series)	January 16 - June 22, 1978	Premiere	
La verdad oculta	July 31, 2006 - January 19, 2007	Premiere	
Las Amazonas	June 23 - September 14, 2016	Premiere	
Las dos caras de Ana	December 4, 2006 - May 22, 2007	Premiere	
Las tontas no van al cielo	March 24 - October 6, 2008	Premiere	
Las vías del amor	October 18, 2002 - September 12, 2003	Premiere	
Llena de amor	September 20, 2010 - May 20, 2011	Premiere	
Lo imperdonable	May 18 - November 5, 2015	Premiere	
Lo que la vida me robó	December 2, 2013 - August 28, 2014	Premiere	
Mañana es para siempre	January 15 - September 8, 2009	Premiere	
Mañana es para siempre	April 28 - September 23, 2016	Repetition	
Mar de amor	December 28, 2009 - August 27, 2010	Premiere	
María la del barrio	June 3, 1996 - May 16, 1997	Premiere	
María la del barrio	December 28, 2009 - May 5, 2010	Repetition	
María la del barrio	June 6 - October 31, 2012	Repetition	
María la del barrio	May 11 - September 16, 2015	Repetition	
María la del barrio	September 4, 2017 - January 12, 2018	Repetition	
María la del barrio	June 18 - November 5, 2025	Repetition	
María, María y María	March 25 - May 16, 1983	Premiere	
María, María y María	July 4 - September 30, 1983	Repetition	
Mariana de la Noche	January 26 - August 27, 2004	Premiere	
Mariana de la Noche	2009	Repetition	
Mariana de la Noche	November 23, 2015 - May 31, 2016	Repetition	
Mentir para vivir	July 8 - November 15, 2013	Premiere	
Mi camino es amarte	February 22 - July 3, 2023	Premiere	
Mi corazón es tuyo	January 13 - June 30, 2015	Premiere	
Mi fortuna es amarte	February 8 - June 22, 2022	Premiere	
Mi hermana la nena	April 15 - July 12, 1985	Premiere	
Mi marido tiene familia	January 21, 2019 - January 21, 2020	Premiere	
Mi pecado	September 1, 2009 - February 12, 2010	Premiere	
Minas de pasión	October 7, 2024 - March 11, 2025	Premiere	
Mision S.O.S	January 29, 2005 - April 8, 2006	Premiere	
Muchacha de barrio	June 16, 1980 - January 2, 1981	Premiere	
Mujer de madera	August 12, 2004 - June 3, 2005	Premiere	
Mujeres de negro	January 2 - March 5, 2018	Premiere	
Mundo de Fieras	March 5 - August 3, 2007	Premiere	
Mundos opuestos (telenovela)	June 23 - November 17, 1978	Premiere	
Muñeca	June 2 - December 9, 1983	Premiere	
Ni contigo ni sin ti	July 11 - October 28, 2011	Premiere	
Pablo y Andrea	March 25 - December 2, 2006	Premiere	
Pacto de amor	September 5, 1978 - February 9, 1979	Premiere	
Palabra de mujer	February 4 - June 6, 2008	Premiere	
Para Volver a amar	January 17 - August 9, 2011	Premiere	
Pasión	October 1, 2007 - February 11, 2008	Premiere	
Pasión y poder	January 9 - May 1, 1989	Premiere	
Pasión y poder	November 23, 2015 - May 24, 2016	Premiere	
Pasiones encendidas	February 12 - July 11, 1979	Premiere	
Pasiones encendidas	December 12, 1983 - May 9, 1984	Repetition	
Peregrina	March 9 - August 3, 2006	Premiere	
Piel de otoño	May 31 - October 6, 2005	Premiere	
Piel de otoño	June 27 - November 2, 2011	Repetition	
Por ella soy Eva	September 30, 2013 - May 18, 2014	Premiere	
Porque el amor manda	October 21, 2013 - April 17, 2014	Premiere	
Qué bonito amor	January 14 - June 28, 2013	Premiere	
Qué pobres tan ricos	May 21, 2014 - January 12, 2015	Premiere	
Que te perdone Dios	April 29 - September 4, 2015	Premiere	
Querida enemiga	July 1 - November 28, 2008	Premiere	
Quiero amarte	November 18, 2013 - July 7, 2014	Premiere	
Rafaela	August 10, 2011 - January 24, 2012	Premiere	
Rayito de luz	December 18, 2000 - January 9, 2001	Premiere	
Rebelde	December 26, 2005 - December 2, 2006	Premiere	
Rina	May 10 - October 2, 1984	Premiere	
Rosalía (TV series)	July 4 - December 29, 1983	Premiere	
Rosalinda (Mexican TV series)	April 12 - August 6, 1999	Premiere	
Rosángela	July 12, 1982 - January 4, 1983	Premiere	
Rubí	August 16, 2004 - February 4, 2005	Premiere	
Rubí	July 12 - December 31, 2007	Repetition	
Rubí	January 17 - June 24, 2011	Repetition	
Rubí	January 2 - April 4, 2017	Repetition	
Rubí	October 31, 2022 - February 17, 2023	Repetition	
Sandra y Paulina	April 4 - July 1, 1983	Premiere	
Sıla	August 10, 2015 - March 24, 2016	Premiere	
Simplemente María	December 21, 2015 - June 22, 2016	Premiere	
Sin rastro de ti	7 - December 29, 2017	Premiere	
Sin tu mirada	December 4, 2017 - May 16, 2018	Premiere	
Soltero con hijas	May 18 - September 15, 2020	Premiere	
Soñadoras	Diciembre 1, 1998 - September 3, 1999	Premiere	
Sortilegio	August 31, 2009 - January 21, 2010	Premiere	
Soy tu dueña	May 24 - December 10, 2010	Premiere	
Te acuerdas de mí	January 17 - April 22, 2022	Premiere	
Te doy la vida	September 16 - December 11, 2020	Premiere	
Teresa	December 8, 2010 - July 8, 2011	Premiere	
Teresa	November 6, 2025 - May 26, 2026	Repetition	
Tierra de esperanza	October 25, 2023 - January 26, 2024	Premiere	
Toda una vida	5 - March 22, 1984	Premiere	
Tormenta en el Paraiso	March 17 - December 5, 2008	Premiere	
Tres veces Ana	September 15, 2016 - March 6, 2017	Premiere	
Triunfo del amor	November 23, 2010 - August 5, 2011	Premiere	
Tú o nadie	October 14, 1985 - January 20, 1986	Premiere	
Tú o nadie	1995	Repetition	
Tú o nadie	January 2 - February 24, 2006	Repetition	
Un camino hacia el destino	May 11 - November 2, 2016	Premiere	
Un gancho al corazón	April 27, 2009 - January 15, 2010	Premiere	
Un refugio para el amor	April 29 - October 18, 2013	Premiere	
Una limosna de amor	September 1, 1982 - January 17, 1983	Premiere	
Velo de Novia	January 4 - July 9, 2010	Premiere	
Verano de amor	February 15 - September 10, 2010	Premiere	
Vino el amor	March 16 - July 7, 2017	Premiere	
Y mañana será otro día	August 27 - November 2, 2018	Premiere	
Yo amo a Juan Querendon	May 23, 2007 - March 14, 2008	Premiere	
Yo no creo en los hombres	December 16, 2014 - May 4, 2015	Premiere	

==== Drama series ====
Title	Transmission date	Fact
Mujer, casos de la vida real	May 3, 2004 – March 3, 2006	Premiere
Mujer, casos de la vida real	December 2, 2006 – March 2, 2007	Repetition
Mujer, casos de la vida real	January 25 - March 2, 2012	Repetition
