= TVyNovelas Award for Best Male Revelation =

Mexican television award

- Awarded for: Best performance by an actor in a debut role
- First award: 1983; Rafael Sánchez Navarro; Mañana es primavera
- Currently held by: 2017; Carlos Rivera; El hotel de los secretos

These men won the TVyNovelas Award for executing the best performance by a man in his debut telenovela.

== Winners and nominees ==
=== 1980s ===
Winner	Nominated
1st TVyNovelas Awards
Rafael Sánchez Navarro for Mañana es primavera	Humberto Zurita for El derecho de nacer; Martín Cortés for Al final del arco iris
2nd TVyNovelas Awards
Sergio Goyri for El maleficio	Rafael Sánchez Navarro for Bodas de odio; Eduardo Yáñez for El maleficio
3rd TVyNovelas Awards
Manuel Saval for Los años felices	Tony Bravo for Tú eres mi destino
4th TVyNovelas Awards
Arturo Peniche for Vivir un poco	Alberto Mayagoitia for Vivir un poco; Luis Xavier for Tú o nadie; Pedrito Fernández for Juana Iris
5th TVyNovelas Awards
Odiseo Bichir for Monte Calvario	David Ostrosky for Marionetas; Ernesto Laguardia for Pobre juventud; Humberto Elizondo for Cuna de lobos
6th TVyNovelas Awards
Armando Araiza for Quinceañera	Miguel Rodarte for Cómo duele callar; Roberto Vander for Victoria
7th TVyNovelas Awards
Ari Telch for Dos vidas	Boy Olmi for El pecado de Oyuki; Miguel Pizarro for Pasión y poder

=== 1990s ===
Winner	Nominated
8th TVyNovelas Awards
Eduardo Palomo for La casa al final de la calle	Alfredo Adame for Mi segunda madre; Rafael Rojas for Teresa
9th TVyNovelas Awards
Eduardo Capetillo for Alcanzar una estrella	Alejandro Ibarra for Alcanzar una estrella; Orlando Carrió for Mi pequeña Soledad; Rodrigo Vidal for Cuando llega el amor; Tomás Goros for Destino
~~1992~~
11th TVyNovelas Awards
Cristian Castro for Las secretas intenciones	Alexis Ayala for Baila conmigo; Gerardo Gallardo for Baila conmigo
12th TVyNovelas Awards
Ariel López Padilla for Corazón salvaje	César Évora for Corazón salvaje; Fernando Colunga for Más allá del puente
13th TVyNovelas Awards
Flavio Cesar for Agujetas de color de rosa	Fabián Robles for El vuelo del águila; Radamés de Jesús for Volver a Empezar
14th TVyNovelas Awards
Francisco Gattorno for La dueña	Juan Manuel Bernal for Lazos de amor; Orlando Miguel for Lazos de amor
15th TVyNovelas Awards
Carlos Ponce for Sentimientos ajenos	Gerardo Quiroz for Confidente de secundaria; Gustavo Ganem for Azul
~~1998 and 1999~~

=== 2000s ===
Winner	Nominated
~~2000~~
19th TVyNovelas Awards
Valentino Lanús for Primer amor... a mil por hora	Jaime Camil for Mi Destino Eres Tú; Pablo Montero for Abrázame muy fuerte
20th TVyNovelas Awards
Gabriel Soto for Amigas y rivales	Christopher von Uckermann for Aventuras en el tiempo; Rafael Amaya for Salomé
21st TVyNovelas Awards
Christian Chávez for Clase 406	Julio Bracho for La Otra; Julio Mannino for Niña amada mía
22nd TVyNovelas Awards
Jan for Amarte es mi pecado	Ari Borovoy for Clap, el lugar de tus sueños; Mauricio Martínez for Clap, el lugar de tus sueños
~~2005 to 2008~~
27th TVyNovelas Awards
Eddy Vilard for Alma de hierro	Osvaldo de León for Palabra de mujer; Ricardo Margaleff for Al diablo con los guapos

=== 2010s ===
Winner	Nominated
28th TVyNovelas Awards
Sebastián Zurita for En nombre del amor	Diego Amozurrutia for Mi pecado; Pepe Wee for Camaleones
29th TVyNovelas Awards
Paul Stanley for Soy tu dueña	Brandon Peniche for Niña de mi corazón; José Carlos Femat for Zacatillo, un lugar en tu corazón
30th TVyNovelas Awards
Pablo Lyle for Una familia con suerte	Juan Diego Covarrubias for Una familia con suerte; Mané de la Parra for Esperanza del corazón
31st TVyNovelas Awards
Axel Ricco for Corona de lágrimas	Alberto Agnesi for Abismo de pasión; Erik Díaz for Un refugio para el amor
~~2014 and 2015~~
34th TVyNovelas Awards
José Carlos Farrera for La sombra del pasado	Ignacio Casano for A que no me dejas; Aldo Guerra for Amores con trampa; José Manuel Lechuga for La vecina; Danilo Carrera for Pasión y poder
35th TVyNovelas Awards
Carlos Rivera for El hotel de los secretos	Federico Ayos for Corazón que miente; Juan Martín Jáuregui for La candidata; Juan Martín Jáuregui for Sin rastro de ti; Santiago Ramundo for Sueño de amor

== Records ==
- Most nominated actors: Rafael Sánchez Navarro with 2 nominations.
- Youngest winner: Armando Araiza, 18 years old.
- Youngest nominee: Christopher von Uckermann, 15 years old.
- Oldest winner: Héctor Soberón, 33 years old.
- Oldest nominee: Alberto Agnesi, 34 years old.
- Actors nominated for the same role without winning:
  - Humberto Elizondo (Cuna de lobos, 1987) and Ignacio Casano (A que no me dejas, 2016)
- Actors winning this category, despite having been as a main villain: Ariel López Padilla (Corazón salvaje, 1994)
- Actors was nominated in this category, despite having played as a main villain:
  - Rafael Sánchez Navarro (Bodas de odio, 1984)
  - Jaime Camil (Mi Destino Eres Tú, 2001)
  - Julio Bracho (La Otra, 2003)
- Foreign winning actors:
  - Carlos Ponce from Puerto Rico
  - Francisco Gattorno from Cuba
