= TVyNovelas Award for Best Female Revelation =

Mexican television award

- Awarded for: Best performance by an actress in a debut role
- First award: 1983; 43 years ago Laura Flores; El derecho de nacer
- Currently held by: 2017; Bárbara López; Vino el amor

These women won the TVyNovelas Award for executing the best performance by a woman in her debut telenovela.

== Winners and nominees ==
=== 1980s ===
Winner	Nominated
1st TVyNovelas Awards
Laura Flores for El derecho de nacer	Leticia Perdigón for Vivir enamorada; Olga Breeskin for Al final del arco iris
2nd TVyNovelas Awards
Julieta Egurrola for Bodas de odio	Erika Buenfil for El maleficio
3rd TVyNovelas Awards
Anna Silvetti for La pasión de Isabela	Gabriela Ruffo for La traición; Leticia Calderón for Amalia Batista
4th TVyNovelas Awards
Ofelia Cano for De pura sangre	Cristina Peñalvert for El ángel caído; Jacaranda Alfaro for De pura sangre; Olivia Collins for Angélica
5th TVyNovelas Awards
Gabriela Rivero for El camino secreto	Alejandra Ávalos for El padre Gallo; Claudia Ramírez for Lista negra; Rosa María Bianchi for Cuna de lobos
6th TVyNovelas Awards
Thalía for Quinceañera	Cynthia Klitbo for Cómo duele callar; Flor Trujillo for Victoria
7th TVyNovelas Awards
Elvira Monsell for Amor en silencio	Cecilia Gabriela for El pecado de Oyuki; Lola Merino for Pasión y poder

=== 1990s ===
Winner	Nominated
8th TVyNovelas Awards
Salma Hayek for Teresa	Chantal Andere for Dulce desafío; Gina Moret for Mi segunda madre
9th TVyNovelas Awards
Mariana Garza for Alcanzar una estrella	Alejandra Procuna for Cenizas y diamantes; Angélica Ruvalcaba for Alcanzar una estrella; Gabriela Hassel for La fuerza del amor; Paola Ochoa for Mi pequeña Soledad
10th TVyNovelas Awards
Tiaré Scanda for Muchachitas	Kate del Castillo for Muchachitas
11th TVyNovelas Awards
Yolanda Andrade for Las secretas intenciones	Nicky Mondellini for María Mercedes; Paulina Rubio for Baila conmigo
12th TVyNovelas Awards
Ana Colchero for Corazón salvaje	Angélica Rivera for Sueño de amor; Yolanda Ventura for Corazón salvaje
13th TVyNovelas Awards
Natalia Esperón for Agujetas de color de rosa	Claudia Silva for Volver a Empezar; Irán Castillo for Agujetas de color de rosa
14th TVyNovelas Awards
Angélica Rivera for La dueña	Maite Embil for La Paloma; Patricia Manterola for Acapulco, cuerpo y alma
15th TVyNovelas Awards
Patricia Navidad for Cañaveral de pasiones	Aylin Mujica for Canción de amor; Nora Salinas for Confidente de secundaria
16th TVyNovelas Awards
Bárbara Mori for Mirada de mujer	Karla Álvarez for Mi querida Isabel; Michelle Vieth for Mi pequeña traviesa
17th TVyNovelas Awards
Sabine Moussier for El Privilegio de Amar	Aracely Arámbula for Soñadoras; Adriana Fonseca for La usurpadora

=== 2000s ===
Winner	Nominated
18th TVyNovelas Awards
Anahí for Mujeres engañadas	Mariana Seoane for Amor gitano
19th TVyNovelas Awards
Ana Layevska for Primer amor... a mil por hora	Belinda for Amigos x siempre; Montserrat Oliver for Ramona
20th TVyNovelas Awards
Susana González for Entre el amor y el odio	Andrea Torre for Sin pecado concebido; Angélica Vale for Amigas y rivales; Sara Maldonado for El juego de la vida
21st TVyNovelas Awards
Mayrín Villanueva for Niña amada mía	Sherlyn for Clase 406; Paola Treviño for Las vías del amor
22nd TVyNovelas Awards
Jacqueline Bracamontes for Alegrijes y Rebujos	Alessandra Rosaldo for Amarte es mi Pecado; Kika Edgar for Clap, el lugar de tus sueños
~~2005 to 2007~~
26th TVyNovelas Awards
Eiza González for Lola, érase una vez	Ariadne Díaz for Muchachitas como tú; Gloria Sierra for Muchachitas como tú
27th TVyNovelas Awards
Zuria Vega for Alma de hierro	Altair Jarabo for Al diablo con los guapos; Violeta Isfel for Las tontas no van al cielo

=== 2010s ===
Winner		Nominated
28th TVyNovelas Awards
	Samadhi Zendejas for Atrévete a soñar	Gabriela Carrillo for Mi pecado; Malillany Marín for Hasta que el dinero nos separe
29th TVyNovelas Awards
	Fátima Torre for Soy tu dueña	Christina Mason for Llena de amor; Thelma Madrigal for Para volver a amar
30th TVyNovelas Awards
Carmine, co-winner	Alejandra García for Una familia con suerte and Laura Carmine for Ni contigo ni sin ti	Carmen Aub for Esperanza del corazón
31st TVyNovelas Awards
	Cassandra Sánchez Navarro for Corona de lágrimas	Esmeralda Pimentel for Abismo de pasión; Sofía Castro for Cachito de cielo; Tania Lizardo for Un refugio para el amor
~~2014 and 2015~~
34th TVyNovelas Awards
	Ela Velden for Muchacha italiana viene a casarse	Jessica Decote for Amores con trampa; Ana Paula Martínez for Antes muerta que Lichita; Edsa Ramírez for La vecina; Irina Baeva for Pasión y poder
35th TVyNovelas Awards
	Bárbara López for Vino el amor	Jessica Segura for Corazón que miente; Regina Blandón for El hotel de los secretos; Michelle González for La candidata; Alejandra Robles Gil for Sin rastro de ti

== Records ==
- Most nominated actress: Angélica Rivera with 2 nominations.
- Youngest winner: Samadhi, 14 years old.
- Youngest nominee: Ana Paula Martínez, 9 years old.
- Oldest winner: Montserrat Oliver, 35 years old.
- Oldest nominee: Gina Morett, 41 years old.
- Actresses that won the award for the same role: Thalía (Quinceañera, 1988) and Ana Layevska (Primer amor... a mil por hora, 2001)
- Actresses who won this category, despite portrayed a main villain:
  - Anna Silvetti (La pasión de Isabela, 1985)
  - Elvira Monsell (Amor en silencio, 1989)
  - Ana Colchero (Corazón salvaje, 1994)
- Actresses nominated in this category, despite portraying a main villain:
  - Chantal Andere (Dulce desafío, 1990)
  - Alejandra Procuna (Cenizas y diamantes, 1991)
  - Paulina Rubio (Baila conmigo, 1993)
  - Nicky Mondellini (María Mercedes, 1993)
  - Claudia Silva (Volver a Empezar, 1995)
  - Nora Salinas (Confidente de secundaria, 1997)
  - Eugenia Cauduro (Alguna vez tendremos alas, 1998)
  - Aracely Arámbula (Soñadoras, 1999)
  - Lili Goret (Juro que te amo, 2009)
  - Malillany Marín (Hasta que el dinero nos separe, 2010)
  - Carmen Aub (Esperanza del corazón, 2012)
- Foreign-winning actress:
  - Anna Silvetti from Spain
  - Sabine Moussier from Germany
  - Bárbara Mori from Uruguay
  - Ana Layevska from Ukraine
  - Laura Carmine from Puerto Rico
