= TVyNovelas Award for Best Antagonist Actor =

Mexican television award

- Awarded for: Best performance by an actor in a antagonic role
- First award: 1983; Miguel Palmer; Al final del arco iris
- Currently held by: 2020; Rodrigo Murray; Médicos

== Winners and nominees ==
=== 1980s ===
Winner	Nominated
1st TVyNovelas Awards
Miguel Palmer for Al final del arco iris	Ignacio López Tarso for El derecho de nacer; Rogelio Guerra for Vanessa
2nd TVyNovelas Awards
Humberto Zurita for El maleficio	Miguel Manzano for El amor ajeno
3rd TVyNovelas Awards
Sergio Jiménez for La traición	Claudio Brook for La pasión de Isabela; José Elías Moreno for Amalia Batista
4th TVyNovelas Awards
Enrique Álvarez Félix for De pura sangre	Alejandro Camacho for Angélica; Manuel Ojeda for De pura sangre; Salvador Pineda for Tú o nadie
5th TVyNovelas Awards
Alejandro Camacho for Cuna de lobos	Claudio Brook for El camino secreto; Gregorio Casal for Cicatrices del alma; José Alonso for Monte calvario
6th TVyNovelas Awards
Sebastián Ligarde for Quinceañera	Enrique Álvarez Félix for Tal como somos; Joaquín Cordero for Cómo duele callar
7th TVyNovelas Awards
Enrique Rocha for Pasión y poder	Salvador Sánchez for El pecado de Oyuki; Sergio Jiménez for Encadenados

=== 1990s ===
Winner	Nominated
8th TVyNovelas Awards
Fernando Ciangherotti for Mi segunda madre	José Alonso for La casa al final de la calle; Sergio Klainer for Dulce desafío
9th TVyNovelas Awards
Enrique Rocha for Yo compro esa mujer	Ernesto Gómez Cruz for La fuerza del amor; Fernando Balzaretti for Destino; Juan Carlos Casasola for Cuando llega el amor; Sergio Bustamante for Cenizas y diamantes
10th TVyNovelas Awards
Gonzalo Vega for En carne propia	Alejandro Camacho for Muchachitas; Jorge Salinas for Mágica juventud
11th TVyNovelas Awards
José Elías Moreno for De frente al sol	Marco Muñoz for Valeria y Maximiliano; Rafael Rojas for Baila conmigo
12th TVyNovelas Awards
Sebastián Ligarde for Entre la vida y la muerte	Enrique Rocha for Dos mujeres, un camino; Humberto Elizondo for Los Parientes Pobres
13th TVyNovelas Awards
Alejandro Camacho for Imperio de cristal	Bruno Rey – El vuelo del águila; Rafael Sánchez Navarro for Volver a Empezar; Toño Infante for Marimar
14th TVyNovelas Awards
Salvador Sánchez for La dueña	Alejandro Tommasi for Retrato de familia; Guillermo García Cantú for Acapulco, cuerpo y alma
15th TVyNovelas Awards
Roberto Ballesteros for Cañaveral de pasiones	Alejandro Camacho for La sombra del otro; Juan Ferrara for La antorcha encendida
16th TVyNovelas Awards
Héctor Suárez Gomiz for Salud, dinero y amor	Alberto Estrella for Alguna vez tendremos alas; Salvador Pineda for Esmeralda
17th TVyNovelas Awards
Enrique Rocha for El Privilegio de Amar	Juan Pablo Gamboa for La usurpadora; Luis Gatica for La mentira

=== 2000s ===
Winner	Nominated
18th TVyNovelas Awards
Manuel Ojeda for Laberintos de pasión	Humberto Elizondo for Nunca te olvidaré; Víctor Noriega for Mujeres engañadas
19th TVyNovelas Awards
César Évora for Abrázame muy fuerte	José Carlos Ruiz for La casa en la playa; Mauricio Islas for Primer amor, a mil por hora; Odiseo Bichir for Amigos x siempre
20th TVyNovelas Awards
Alejandro Tommasi for El Manantial	Alberto Estrella for Entre el Amor y el Odio; Sergio Goyri for Sin pecado concebido
21st TVyNovelas Awards
Enrique Rocha for Las vias del amor	Juan Pablo Gamboa for Niña amada mía; Sergio Sendel for La Otra
22nd TVyNovelas Awards
César Évora for Mariana de la noche	Héctor Suárez for Velo de novia; Odiseo Bichir for Amarte es mi Pecado
23rd TVyNovelas Awards
Fabián Robles for Apuesta por un amor	Carlos Cámara Jr. for Mujer de madera; Manuel Landeta for Rubí
24th TVyNovelas Awards
Sergio Goyri for Piel de otoño	Enrique Rocha for Rebelde; Guillermo García Cantú for La madrastra; Luis Roberto Guzmán for Alborada
25th TVyNovelas Awards
César Évora for Mundo de fieras	Mauricio Aspe for Las dos caras de Ana; Raúl Magaña for La fea más bella; René Strickler for Amar sin limites; Sergio Sendel for Heridas de amor
26th TVyNovelas Awards
Sergio Sendel for Destilando Amor	Fabián Robles for Muchachitas como tú; José Elías Moreno for Pasión
27th TVyNovelas Awards
Guillermo García Cantú for Fuego en la sangre	Alejandro Tommasi for Tormenta en el paraíso; Alexis Ayala for Juro Que Te Amo

=== 2010s ===
Winner	Nominated
28th TVyNovelas Awards
David Zepeda for Sortilegio	Cristián de la Fuente for Corazón salvaje; Rogelio Guerra for Mañana es para siempre
29th TVyNovelas Awards
Juan Carlos Barreto for Para volver a amar	Alexis Ayala for Llena de amor; Manuel Landeta for Teresa; Sergio Goyri for Soy tu dueña
30th TVyNovelas Awards
Juan Ferrara for La fuerza del destino	Jorge Ortiz de Pinedo for Dos hogares; Lisardo for Esperanza del corazón
31st TVyNovelas Awards
Marcelo Córdoba for Por Ella Soy Eva	César Évora for Amor bravío; Salvador Zerboni for Abismo de pasión
32nd TVyNovelas Awards
Manuel Ojeda for La Tempestad	Diego Olivera for Mentir para vivir; Erick Elías for Porque el amor manda; Iván Sánchez for La Tempestad
33rd TVyNovelas Awards
Flavio Medina for Yo no creo en los hombres	Alberto Estrella for La malquerida; Alexis Ayala for Lo que la vida me robó; Sergio Sendel for Lo que la vida me robó
34th TVyNovelas Awards
Fernando Colunga for Pasión y poder	Eduardo Santamarina for Antes muerta que Lichita; Julián Gil for Hasta el fin del mundo; Alexis Ayala for La sombra del pasado; Alejandro Ávila for Que te perdone Dios
35th TVyNovelas Awards
Juan Carlos Barreto for La candidata	Alejandro Tommasi for Corazón que miente; Jorge Poza for El hotel de los secretos; José Elías Moreno for Sin rastro de ti; Julián Gil for Sueño de amor
36th TVyNovelas Awards
Danilo Carrera for La doble vida de Estela Carrillo	Arath de la Torre for Caer en tentación; Alfredo Gatica for Enamorándome de Ramón; Pedro Moreno for Me declaro culpable; Eduardo Santamarina for Sin tu mirada
37th TVyNovelas Awards
Alejandro Nones for Amar a muerte	Alexis Ayala Hijas de la luna; Óscar Schwebel for Like; Germán Bracco for Mi marido tiene familia; Julián Gil for Por amar sin ley

=== 2020s ===
Winner	Nominated
38th TVyNovelas Awards
Rodrigo Murray for Médicos	Diego Amozurrutia for Cuna de lobos; Emmanuel Palomares for Vencer el miedo; Jorge Poza for Ringo; Sergio Sendel for El corazón nunca se equivoca

== Records ==
- Most awarded actor: Enrique Rocha, 4 times.
- Most nominated actors: Enrique Rocha and Alejandro Camacho with 6 nominations.
- Most nominated actor (never winner): Alexis Ayala with 4 nominations.
- Actors have won all nominations: Sebastián Ligarde and Juan Carlos Barreto, 2 times. Alejandro Nones and Rodrigo Murray, 1 time.
- Youngest winner: Danilo Carrera, 29 years old.
- Youngest nominee: Jose Elias Moreno, 28 years old.
- Oldest winner: Manuel Ojeda, 73 years old.
- Oldest nominee: Miguel Manzano, 77 years old.
- Actors winning after short time: Enrique Rocha by (Pasión y poder, 1989) and (Yo compro esa mujer, 1991), 2 years difference.
- Actors winning after long time: Manuel Ojeda by (Laberintos de pasión, 2000) and (La Tempestad, 2014), 14 years difference.
- Actors that winning the award for the same role: Enrique Rocha (Pasión y poder, 1989), César Évora (Mundo de fieras, 2006) and Fernando Colunga (Pasión y poder, 2016)
- Actors nominated for the same role without winning:
  - Alejandro Camacho (Muchachitas, 1992) and Fabián Robles (Muchachitas como tú, 2008)
  - Marco Muñoz (Valeria y Maximiliano, 1993) and Sergio Sendel (Heridas de amor, 2007)
- Foreign winning actors:
  - Roberto Ballesteros from Peru
  - César Évora from Cuba
  - Marcelo Córdoba from Argentina
  - Danilo Carrera from Ecuador
  - Alejandro Nones from Venezuela
