= 1st TVyNovelas Awards =

1983 Mexican TV awards

- Date: June 1983
- Location: Mexico City, Mexico

Highlights
- Most awards: Mañana es primavera (3)
- Most nominations: El derecho de nacer (5)

The 1st TVyNovelas Awards was an academy of special awards to the best soap operas and TV shows. The awards ceremony took place in 1983 in Mexico City.

Mañana es primavera won 3 awards, the most for the evening. Other winners El derecho de nacer won 2 awards, including Best Telenovela, and Al final del arco iris, Chispita, El amor nunca muere, Gabriel y Gabriela, Toda una vida and Vanessa won 1 each.

== Summary of awards and nominations ==
Telenovela	Nominations	Awards
El derecho de nacer	5	2
Mañana es primavera	4	3
Al final del arco iris	4	1
Vanessa	4	1
Gabriel y Gabriela	3	1
El amor nunca muere	2	1
Chispita	1	1
Toda una vida	1	1
Vivir enamorada	1	0

== Winners and nominees ==
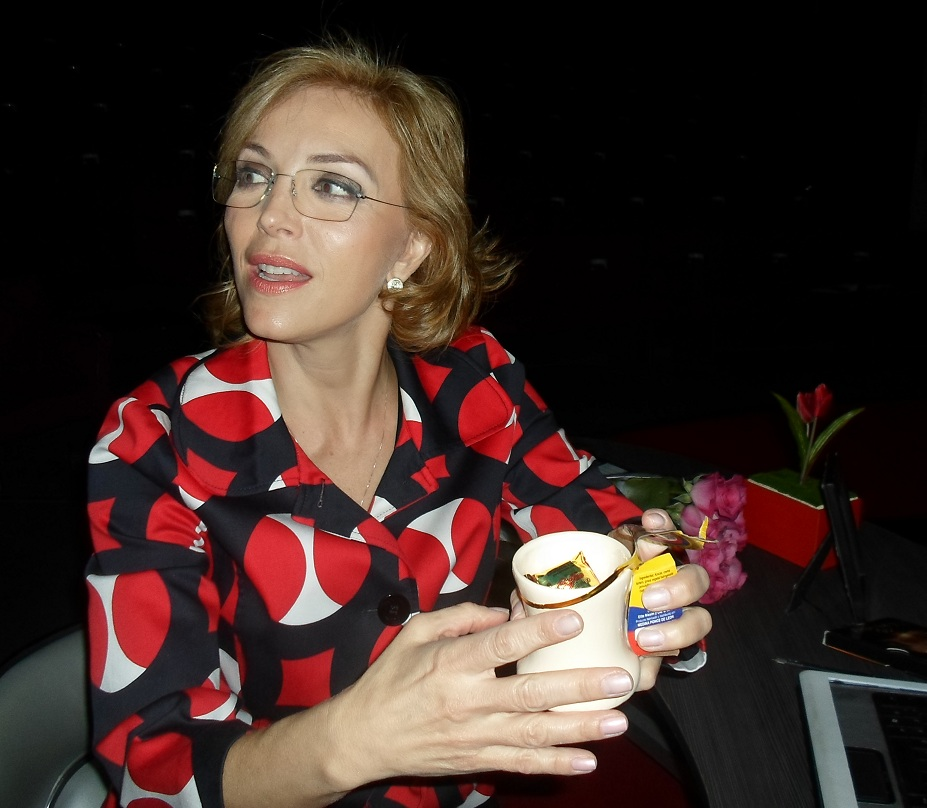
Laura Flores (shown in 2012) was 19-years-old when she won for Best Female Revelation.

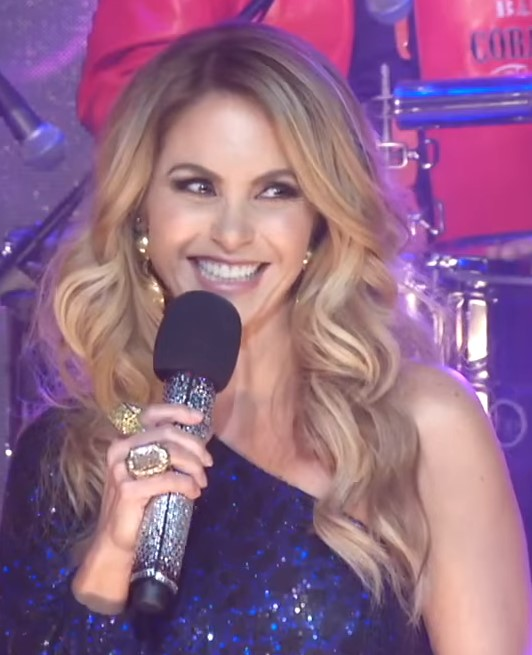
Lucero (shown in 2017) was 13-years-old when she won for Best Child Actress.

Best Telenovela	Best Production
El derecho de nacer; Gabriel y Gabriela; Mañana es primavera	Guillermo Diazayas – Toda una vida
Best Actress	Best Actor
Silvia Pinal – Mañana es primavera; Ana Martín – Gabriel y Gabriela; Christian Bach – El amor nunca muere	Jorge Martínez de Hoyos – Gabriel y Gabriela; Héctor Bonilla – Vanessa; Sergio Jiménez – El derecho de nacer
Best Antagonist Actress	Best Antagonist Actor
Sylvia Pasquel – El amor nunca muere; Ana Silvia Garza – Vanessa; Magda Guzmán – Al final del arco iris	Miguel Palmer – Al final del arco iris; Ignacio López Tarso – El derecho de nacer; Rogelio Guerra – Vanessa
Best Female Revelation	Best Male Revelation
Laura Flores – El derecho de nacer; Leticia Perdigón – Vivir enamorada; Olga Breeskin – Al final del arco iris	Rafael Sánchez Navarro – Mañana es primavera; Humberto Zurita – El derecho de nacer; Martín Cortés – Al final del arco iris

=== Other Awards ===
Best Debut Actress	Best Debut Actor
Viridiana Alatriste – Mañana es primavera	Alfredo Alegría – Cachún cachún ra ra!
Best Child Actress	Best Child Actor
Lucero – Chispita	Carlos Espejel – Chiquilladas

=== Comedy and Variety Programs ===
Best Comedy Program	Best Variety Program
Cachún cachún ra ra!	XE-TU
Best Comedy Actress	Best Comedy Actor
Lucila Mariscal – La carabina de Ambrosio	Rodolfo Rodríguez – Cachún cachún ra ra!
Best Hostess	Best Host
Erika Buenfil – XE-TU	Raúl Velasco – Siempre en domingo
Revelation as a Host	Revelation in Music
René Casados – XE-TU	Crystal
Best Children's Program	Best Child Singer
Chiquilladas	Luis Miguel

=== Special awards ===
- Audience's Favorite Star: Lucía Méndez for Vanessa
- Lifetime Artistic Achievement Award to a Female Artist: Isabela Corona
- Lifetime Artistic Achievement Award to a Male Artist: Ernesto Alonso
- Best Television Vedette: Lilia Deneken

=== "Shows" of the Year ===
- Elías Selem's Jazz Band
- Los Five Fingers
- Víctor Guzmán's Band
- Wizard Chen Kai
- Yoshio
