= TVyNovelas Award for Best Antagonist Actress =

Mexican television award

- Awarded for: Best performance by an actress in an antagonic role
- First award: 1983; Silvia Pasquel; El amor nunca muere
- Currently held by: 2020; Sandra Echeverría; La usurpadora

== Winners and nominees ==
=== 1980s ===
Winner	Nominated
1st TVyNovelas Awards
Sylvia Pasquel for El amor nunca muere	Ana Silvia Garza for Vanessa; Magda Guzmán for Al final del arco iris
2nd TVyNovelas Awards
Rocío Banquells for Bianca Vidal	Rosario Gálvez for El maleficio; Úrsula Prats for El amor ajeno
3rd TVyNovelas Awards
Rebecca Rambal for Guadalupe	Gabriela Ruffo for La traición; Claudia Islas for Tú eres mi destino
4th TVyNovelas Awards
Rebecca Jones for El ángel caído	Beatriz Sheridan for Vivir un poco; Patsy for Los años pasan; Úrsula Prats for Tú o nadie
5th TVyNovelas Awards
María Rubio for Cuna de lobos	Lilia Aragón for Cuna de lobos; Malena Doria for Herencia maldita; Úrsula Prats for Monte calvario
6th TVyNovelas Awards
Laura Zapata for Rosa salvaje	Isabela Corona for Victoria; Úrsula Prats for Pobre señorita Limantour
7th TVyNovelas Awards
Margarita Sanz for Amor en silencio	Alma Muriel for El extraño retorno de Diana Salazar; Claudia Islas for Pasión y poder

=== 1990s ===
Winner	Nominated
8th TVyNovelas Awards
Susana Dosamantes for Morir para vivir	Alejandra Maldonado for Mi segunda madre; Gabriela Goldsmith for Simplemente María
9th TVyNovelas Awards
July Furlong for Mi pequeña Soledad	Alma Muriel for Yo compro esa mujer; Mariagna Prats for Destino; Nailea Norvind for Cuando llega el amor; Rosa María Bianchi for Mi pequeña Soledad
10th TVyNovelas Awards
Cynthia Klitbo for Cadenas de amargura	Marisol Santacruz for Mágica juventud; Rosa María Bianchi for Vida robada
11th TVyNovelas Awards
Laura Zapata for Maria Mercedes	Anna Silvetti for De frente al sol; Rebecca Jones for La sonrisa del Diablo
12th TVyNovelas Awards
Diana Bracho for Capricho	Chantal Andere for Los Parientes Pobres; Laura Flores for Clarisa
13th TVyNovelas Awards
María Rubio for Imperio de cristal	Chantal Andere for Marimar; Julieta Egurrola for Prisionera de amor
14th TVyNovelas Awards
Itatí Cantoral for María la del Barrio	Cynthia Klitbo for La Dueña; Yolanda Andrade for Retrato de familia
15th TVyNovelas Awards
Chantal Andere for Sentimientos Ajenos	Ana Patricia Rojo for Bendita mentira; Azela Robinson for Cañaveral de Pasiones
16th TVyNovelas Awards
Cynthia Klitbo for Alguna vez tendremos alas	Eugenia Cauduro for Alguna vez tendremos alas; Laura Zapata for Esmeralda
17th TVyNovelas Awards
Cynthia Klitbo for El Privilegio de Amar	Adamari López for Camila; Karla Álvarez for La Mentira

=== 2000s ===
Winner	Nominated
18th TVyNovelas Awards
Mónika Sánchez for Laberintos de pasión	Alma Muriel for Nunca te olvidaré; Nora Salinas for Rosalinda
19th TVyNovelas Awards
Itatí Cantoral for Sin pecado concebido	Susana Zabaleta for Mi Destino Eres Tú; Yadhira Carrillo for El precio de tu amor
20th TVyNovelas Awards
Nailea Norvind for Abrázame muy fuerte	Joana Benedek for Amigas y rivales; Karyme Lozano for El Manantial
21st TVyNovelas Awards
Sasha Montenegro for Las Vías del Amor	Emilia Carranza for Niña amada mía; María Victoria for De pocas, pocas pulgas
22nd TVyNovelas Awards
Angélica Rivera for Mariana de la Noche	Chantal Andere for Amor real; Cynthia Klitbo for Velo de novia; Laisha Wilkins for Bajo la misma piel
23rd TVyNovelas Awards
Helena Rojo for Inocente de Ti	Maya Mishalska for Mujer de madera; Mónika Sánchez for Apuesta por un amor
24th TVyNovelas Awards
Daniela Romo for Alborada	Cynthia Klitbo for Peregrina; Jacqueline Andere for La Madrastra; Lilia Aragón for La esposa virgen
25th TVyNovelas Awards
Edith González for Mundo de fieras	Fabiola Campomanes for Duelo de Pasiones; Margarita Magaña for La verdad oculta; Patricia Navidad for La fea más bella; Sabine Moussier for Amar sin limites
26th TVyNovelas Awards
Chantal Andere for Destilando Amor	Adamari López for Bajo las riendas del amor; Daniela Castro for Pasión
27th TVyNovelas Awards
Diana Bracho for Fuego en la sangre	Adamari López for Alma de hierro; Cynthia Klitbo for Palabra de mujer

=== 2010s ===
Winner	Nominated
28th TVyNovelas Awards
Leticia Calderón for En nombre del amor	Altaír Jarabo for En nombre del amor; Aracely Arámbula for Corazón salvaje; Violeta Isfel for Atrévete a soñar
29th TVyNovelas Awards
Rocío Banquells for Cuando me enamoro	Azela Robinson for Llena de amor; Jacqueline Andere for Soy tu dueña; Margarita Magaña for Teresa
30th TVyNovelas Awards
Daniela Romo for Triunfo del amor	Chantal Andere for Rafaela; Laisha Wilkins for La fuerza del destino; Olivia Collins for Dos hogares
31st TVyNovelas Awards
Leticia Calderón for Amor bravío	Mariana Seoane for Por ella soy Eva; Sabine Moussier for Abismo de pasión
32nd TVyNovelas Awards
Marjorie de Sousa for Amores verdaderos	Altaír Jarabo for Mentir para vivir; Claudia Álvarez for Porque el amor manda; Esmeralda Pimentel for De que te quiero, te quiero
33rd TVyNovelas Awards
Daniela Castro for Lo que la vida me robó	Azela Robinson for Yo no creo en los hombres; Claudia Ramírez for El color de la pasión; Mayrín Villanueva for Mi corazón es tuyo
34th TVyNovelas Awards
Laura Carmine for A que no me dejas	Marisol del Olmo for Amor de barrio; Ingrid Martz for Antes muerta que Lichita; Alejandra Barros for La sombra del pasado; Grettell Valdez for Lo imperdonable
35th TVyNovelas Awards
Azela Robinson for Vino el amor	Diana Bracho for El hotel de los secretos; Nailea Norvind for La candidata; Ana Layevska for Sin rastro de ti; Sabine Moussier for Sueño de amor
36th TVyNovelas Awards
Daniela Castro for Me declaro culpable	Julieta Egurrola Caer en tentación; Luz Elena González for Enamorándome de Ramón; África Zavala for La doble vida de Estela Carrillo; Lola Merino for Mi marido tiene familia
37th TVyNovelas Awards
Claudia Martín for Amar a muerte	Mariluz Bermúdez Hijas de la luna; Ilza Ponko for La Piloto; Bárbara Islas for Mi marido tiene familia; Grettell Valdez for Tenías que ser tú

=== 2020s ===
Winner	Nominated
38th TVyNovelas Awards
Sandra Echeverría for La usurpadora	Gloria Stalina for La reina soy yo; Luz Edith Rojas for Ringo; Nicole Vale for Vencer el miedo; Nailea Norvind for Cuna de lobos

== Records ==
- Most awarded actress: Laura Zapata, Cynthia Klitbo, Diana Bracho, María Rubio, Itatí Cantoral, Chantal Andere, Daniela Romo, Rocío Banquells, Daniela Castro and Leticia Calderón, 2 times.
- Most nominated actress: Cynthia Klitbo with 8 nominations.
- Most nominated actresses without a win: Alma Muriel, Lilia Aragón, Úrsula Prats and Jacqueline Andere with 3 nominations.
- Αctresses have won all their nominations: Leticia Calderon, Daniela Romo, María Rubio, Rocio Banquells, and Itati Cantoral, 2 times. Claudia Martín and Sandra Echeverría, 1 time.
- Youngest winner: Itati Cantoral, 21 years old.
- Youngest nominee: Nailea Norvind, 20 years old.
- Oldest winner: Diana Bracho, 65 years old.
- Oldest nominee: Isabela Corona, 75 years old.
- Actress winning after short time:
  - Leticia Calderón by (En nombre del amor, 2010) and (Amor bravío, 2013), 3 years difference.
  - Daniela Castro by (Lo que la vida me robó, 2015) and (Me declaro culpable, 2018), 3 years difference.
- Actress winning after long time: Rocío Banquells by (Bianca Vidal, 1984) and (Cuando me enamoro, 2011), 27 years difference.
- Actresses that winning the award for the same role: Laura Zapata (María Mercedes, 1993) and Helena Rojo (Inocente de ti, 2004).
- Actresses nominated for the same role without winning:
  - Beatriz Sheridan (Vivir un poco, 1985) and Jacqueline Andere (La madrastra, 2005)
  - Nailea Norvind (Cuando llega el amor, 1990) and Adamari López (Bajo las Riendas del Amor, 2007)
  - Azela Robinson (Cañaveral de pasiones, 1997) and Sabine Moussier (Abismo de pasión, 2013)
  - Karla Álvarez (La mentira, 1998) and Grettell Valdez (Lo imperdonable, 2015)
- Foreign winning actresses:
  - Sasha Montenegro from Italy
  - Marjorie de Sousa from Venezuela
  - Laura Carmine from Puerto Rico
  - Azela Robinson from United Kingdom
