= Alba Nydia Díaz =

Puerto Rican actress

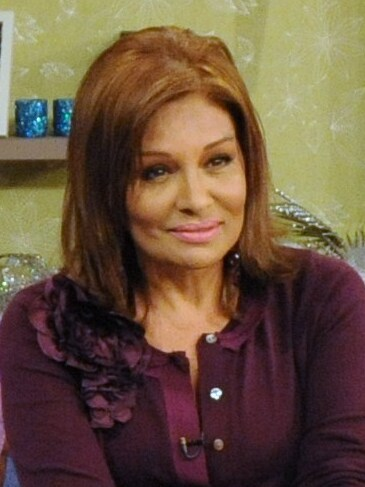
- Díaz in 2011
- Born: April 27, 1955 (age 71); Caguas, Puerto Rico
- Occupation: Actress
- Years active: 1969–present

Alba Nydia Díaz (born April 27, 1955) is a Puerto Rican actress who has worked in Puerto Rico and Mexico.

== Early years ==
Díaz was born in Caguas, Puerto Rico. Graduated from Gautier Benítez High School in Caguas. The roles she portrayed in her early days and years after were not leading roles, from Conciencia Culpable (Guilty Conscience), in 1969, through Cristina Bazán, in 1977.

== Acting career on television ==
After Ja-ja, ji-ji, jo-jo con Agrelot was introduced in 1970, Díaz was given a recurrent role opposite José Miguel Agrelot. During the 1970s, she appeared in Mexican soap operas including Colorina (Goldfinch), with Mexican actress Lucía Méndez, El derecho de nacer (The Right to be Born), and El maleficio (The Curse), also taped and broadcast by Televisa.

By the end of the 1970s, Díaz was performing in leading roles in the telenovelas: La Jibarita (The Country Girl), taped in Dominican Republic, Modelos S.A. (Models S.A.) opposite Fernando Allende and Giselle Blondet, and Cuando Despierta un Amor (When a love arouses), opposite Braulio Castillo Jr., both taped in Puerto Rico.

== Acting career on stage ==
Díaz has also performed on stage in Puerto Rico, including in La Pasión según Antígona Pérez (The Passion of Antígona Pérez), La Casa de Bernarda Alba (The House of Bernard Alba), La Carreta (The Oxcart), Zorba the Greek, Electra, Tiempo Muerto (Dead Season), and Frida Kahlo Viva la Vida.

== Producer ==
Díaz has her own film production company called Copelar, with her actress partner Sonia Valentín. She has starred in and produced several television movies, such as Sudor Amargo (Bitter Sweat) and Las Combatientes (The Combatants).

== Television host ==
Díaz hosted the daily talk show Entre Nosotras (Among Us) with actresses Valentin and Noris Joffre, among other personalities. It was broadcast by Televicentro in Puerto Rico and WAPA America, throughout the United States.

== Filmography ==
Television performances
Year	Title	Role
1978	Cristina Bazán	Taina
1980	Colorina	Liza
1980	Al final del arco iris	Adriana
1980	La otra mujer	Susana
1980	El ídolo	Alana
1981	El derecho de nacer	Virginia
1983	El maleficio	Sara
1985	Tanairí	Altagracia
1989	La conciencia de Lucía	
1995	Señora Tentacion	Azabache
1995	Al son del amor	
1998	Flores de la noche	Mryriam
1999	Cuando despierta el amor	
2003	Psicosis	Irene
2004	Las combatientes	Noemi

Film performances
Year	Title
1973	Adios, New York, adios
1993	A Flight of Hope
2003	Bitter Sweat
2003	Plaza vacante
