= Giovanni Medina =

Mexican businessman, columnist and political advisor (born 1989)

Giovanni Medina (born December 28, 1989) is a Mexican businessman, entrepreneur, columnist and political advisor. He is known for his involvement with the National Regeneration Movement (Morena).

== Early life and education ==
Giovanni Medina was born on December 28, 1989, in Mexico City, Mexico. He holds a Bachelor's degree in Law and a Master’s degree in Public Administration and Finance.

== Career ==
Medina has worked as an investor and entrepreneur within Mexico’s private sector. He is a member of various business associations and has been featured as a regular columnist in El Financiero, where he contributes analyses on political and economic affairs. He is also frequently invited to participate in televised and print-media debates on outlets such as Milenio and La Saga.

=== Social activism ===
Medina has also been active in philanthropic work: he organised the #QuédateEnCasaYoTeApoyo COVID-19 relief initiative in April 2020, which media reports say provided food and financial assistance to over 1,000 families, and he has supported annual school-supply/uniform drives and offered pro bono family-law advice through affiliated charities. He also in partnership with Montserrat Oliver promotes annual school-supply and uniform drives for primary-school students and offers pro bono legal services on family-law matters. He is affiliated with multiple charitable organizations and advocates for environmental protection.

== Political involvement ==
On October 2, 2011, Giovanni Medina became involved with the National Regeneration Movement (Morena) when it was established as a civil association. On July 10, 2014, Morena was officially registered as a political party, marking the beginning of Medina's formal association with its political activities. Medina was a member of Claudia Sheinbaum’s presidential campaign team, serving in roles that the press and profiles describe as including strategy, coordination, communications and spokesperson duties during the campaign period beginning in mid-2023; Sheinbaum was named MORENA’s presidential candidate on 6 September 2023 and went on to win the general election held 2 June 2024.

He was an outreach and coordination figure who acted as an enlace with social, business and media sectors during the selection and electoral phases of the campaign. On June 2, 2024, Sheinbaum was elected President of Mexico, a milestone in the political movement in which Medina played a supporting role.

Outside politics Medina is described as a regular columnist and opinion contributor (notably for El Financiero) and as a contributor to outlets such as 24 Horas and Líderes Mexicanos, and he has frequently appeared as a panelist on political-analysis programmes including Adela Micha’s La Saga.

== Personal life ==
Medina has one son, Emmanuel (born 2014), with singer and actress Ninel Conde. His past relationships include Romina Mircoli (2012) and, by some accounts, actress Geraldine Bazán. In 2020, he was named Father of the Year by Cosas magazine.

Since early 2025, he has been linked romantically with actress Irina Baeva.
