= Pasión y poder (2015 TV series) =

2015 telenovela

- Also known as: Passion and Power
- Genre: Telenovela
- Created by: Marrisa Garrido
- Written by: Ximena Suárez; Janely E. Lee; Alejandra Díaz; Vanessa Valera
- Directed by: Salvador Garcini; Alejandro Gamboa
- Starring: Jorge Salinas; Fernando Colunga; Susana González; Marlene Favela
- Music by: Giblerto Novelo
- Opening theme: "Pasión y poder"
- Country of origin: Mexico
- Original language: Spanish
- No. of episodes: 136

Production
- Executive producer: José Alberto Castro
- Producers: Ernesto Hernández; Fausto Sainz
- Editors: Juan Ordoñez; Héctor Flores
- Camera setup: Multi-camera
- Running time: 42-45 minutes
- Production company: Televisa

Original release
- Network: Canal de las Estrellas
- Release: October 5, 2015 – April 10, 2016

Related
- Lo imperdonable; El hotel de los secretos; Pasión y poder; Mundo de fieras

Pasión y poder (English title: Passion and Power) is a Mexican telenovela produced by José Alberto Castro for Televisa. It is a remake of the Mexican telenovela Pasión y poder, produced in 1988. It was created by Marrisa Garrido and developed by Ximena Suárez.

The series stars Jorge Salinas as Arturo, Fernando Colunga as Eladio, Susana González as Julia and Marlene Favela as Nina.

== Plot ==
Pasión y poder revolves around family dramas and corporate powers of two rival families. The rivalry that originated many years ago, when Arturo Montenegro and Eladio Gómez Luna both fell in love with the beautiful Julia Vallado. Eladio ultimately married her. Years later, Julia Vallado is a very unhappy woman having to suffer from abuse and therefore endures the wickedness of her husband, with her only consolation, is the love of his son David, a complete antithesis of his father. Arturo however is married to Nina a very ambitious woman who even though is in love with Arturo wallows in all his riches. Together they have three children, Eric the eldest who is wicked and tries hard to follow in his father's footsteps. Regina the second oldest who is very kind, beautiful and hardworking and the last born being Daniella who is ambitious like her mother with a wicked heart and jealous of Regina's undeniable beauty. Arturo also has an older son Miguel from a woman who died before he married Nina. Miguel is secretly in love with Consuelo Eric's wife who also has to endure Eric's wickedness unaware that he is having an affair with a model called Montserrat. Regina is engaged and ready to be married by his fiancé Joshua who ultimately crashes his bike with David Gomez Luna (Eladio's son) hence causing an accident that will tie their lives forever. The accident causes the two rival families to meet once more in the hospital. David is badly injured while Joshua is discharged immediately only to be seduced by Daniella hence ending up kissing to Regina's dismay who finds them in the act and ends up breaking her engagement. Tired of his father's wickedness and comparing him to Franco Eladio's godson who unlike David is entirely loyal to Eladio he decides to leave for a vacation. There, David meets Daniella Montenegro and they start a romance but Daniella ends the relationship realizing David was not rich enough. David is therefore brokenhearted and realizes that all Montenegros are evil. After getting a job offer as an engineer he accepts only to find out he is partnered with Regina Montenegro. Their work relationship starts off as a rocky start since David thinks that Regina is very much wicked like her sister Daniella. Over time they grow closer David realizing that Regina is hardworking and kindhearted hence their relationship grows into an undeniable love. They are followed by the dilemma of confessing their love to their families hoping that it would be a chance for peace between them. However it would seem impossible for them since Daniella who regrets dumping David tries every thing possible to win him back. Elsewhere Arturo and Julia rekindle their feelings for each hence making Nina and Eladio to join forces and prevent the two from being together.

== Cast ==
=== Main ===
- Jorge Salinas as Arturo Montenegro
- Fernando Colunga as Eladio Gomez Luna
- Susana González as Julia Vallado de Gomez Luna
- Marlene Favela as Nina de Montenegro

=== Also main ===
- Michelle Renaud as Regina Montenegro
- Altaír Jarabo as Consuelo Martínez
- José Pablo Minor as David Gómez Luna
- Alejandro Nones as Erick Montenegro
- Danilo Carrera as Franco Herrera
- Fabiola Guajardo as Gabriela Díaz
- Marco Méndez as Agustín Ornelas
- Jaume Mateu as Miguel Montenegro
- Irina Baeva as Daniela Montenegro
- Enrique Montaño as Justino
- Geraldo Albarrán as El Callao
- Boris Duflos as Francisco
- Raquel Olmedo as Gisela Fuentes
- Luis Bayardo as Humberto Vallado
- Alejandro Aragón as Aldo
- Raquel Garza as Petra / Samanta
- Ericka García as Maribel
- Pilar Escalante as Ángeles
- Óscar Medellín as Joshua Solares
- Daniela Fridman as Marintia
- Jorge Bolaños as Santos
- Victoria Camacho as Montserrat Moret
- Gema Garoa as Clara Álvarez
- Issabela Camil as Caridad

=== Recurring ===
- Fabián Pizzorno as Ashmore
- Mara Matosic

== Awards and nominations ==
Year	Award	Category	Recipient	Result
2016	34th TVyNovelas Awards	Best Telenovela of the Year	Pasión y poder	Won
2016	34th TVyNovelas Awards	Best Cast	Pasión y poder	Won
2016	34th TVyNovelas Awards	Best Actor	Jorge Salinas	Nominated
2016	34th TVyNovelas Awards	Best Antagonist Actor	Fernando Colunga	Won
2016	34th TVyNovelas Awards	Best Leading Actor	Luis Bayardo	Nominated
2016	34th TVyNovelas Awards	Best Co-lead Actor	José Pablo Minor	Won
2016	34th TVyNovelas Awards	Best Supporting Actress	Fabiola Guajardo	Won
2016	34th TVyNovelas Awards	Best Female Revelation	Irina Baeva	Nominated
2016	34th TVyNovelas Awards	Best Male Revelation	Danilo Carrera	Nominated

== Broadcast ==
The series originally aired from October 5, 2015, to April 10, 2016, in Mexico on Canal de las Estrellas. The series premiered on November 3, 2015, to April 28, 2016, in United States on Univision. The series was once retransmitted on September 9, 2019, to March 11, 2020, in United States on Unimas.

=== Ratings ===
Timeslot (ET/PT)	No. of episodes	Premiered		Ended	
Timeslot (ET/PT)	No. of episodes	Date	Premiere Ratings	Date	Finale Ratings
Monday to Friday 9:25PM	136	October 5, 2015	21.4	April 10, 2016	—N/a
