= El amor nunca muere =

El amor nunca muere may refer to:

- Love Never Dies (1955 film) (El amor nunca muere), a 1955 Argentine romantic drama film
- El amor nunca muere (TV series), a Mexican telenovela
