= Vanessa (Mexican TV series) =

- Rogelio Guerra and Lucía Méndez in the soap opera
- Genre: Telenovela
- Created by: Antonio Texeira Filho
- Written by: Luis Reyes de la Maza
- Directed by: Raul Araiza Jr. Herval Rossano; Manolo García
- Starring: Lucía Méndez; Héctor Bonilla; Rogelio Guerra; Angélica Aragón; Nuria Bages; Antonio Brillas
- Opening theme: Vanessa by Bebu Silvetti
- Country of origin: Mexico
- Original language: Spanish
- No. of episodes: 172

Production
- Executive producer: Valentín Pimstein
- Cinematography: Manuel Ruiz Esparza

Original release
- Network: Canal de las Estrellas
- Release: February 11 – October 1, 1982

Related
- Idolo de pano (1975); Sonho meu (1993)

Vanessa is a Mexican telenovela produced by Valentín Pimstein for Televisa in 1982. Is a remake of the successful Brazilian telenovela Idolo de Pano.

It starred by Lucía Méndez, Héctor Bonilla, Rogelio Guerra, Angélica Aragón and Nuria Bages.

== Plot ==
Vanessa is a young girl who lives with her father José de Jesús and his brother Juan. Both work at the railway, and have a small house near the tracks. In order to help them, Vanessa gets a job in the textile factory of Cecile Saint Michel, run by a powerful and successful woman who lives in a huge mansion with her grandchildren Pierre and Luciano.

== Cast ==
- Lucía Méndez as Vanessa
- Héctor Bonilla as Luciano
- Rogelio Guerra as Pierre
- Angélica Aragón as Luisa
- Nuria Bages as Jane
- Antonio Brillas as José de Jesus
- Aurora Clavell as Rosa
- Isabela Corona as Dona Cecile de St. Michel
- Carlos Cámara as Dr. Servin
- Alma Delfina as Lolita
- Pedro Juan Figueroa as Wagner
- Virginia Gutiérrez as Magda
- Fernando Larranga as Dr.Fuentes
- Antonio Medellín as Guillermo
- Flor Procuna as Martha
- Adriana Roel as Amelia
- Abraham Stavans as Nicolás
- Sylvia Suárez as Armida
- Alejandro Camacho as Juan
- Rosalía Valdéz as Irma
- Maricarmen Martínez as Cristina
- Ana Silvia Garza as Elsa
- Patricia Ancira as Ana
- Roxana Saucedo as Flavia
- Mirrah Saavedra as Rita
- Mariana Gajá as Vanessa's daughter
- Miguel Cane as Pierre (age 7)
- Christopher Lago as Luciano (age 7)
- Emilio Gaete as Mauricio Subercaseaux

== Awards ==
Year	Award	Category	Nominee	Result
1983	1st TVyNovelas Awards	Best Actor	Héctor Bonilla	Nominated
1983	1st TVyNovelas Awards	Best Antagonist Actress	Ana Silvia Garza	Nominated
1983	1st TVyNovelas Awards	Best Antagonist Actor	Rogelio Guerra	Nominated
