= El derecho de nacer (1981 TV series) =

- Genre: Telenovela
- Created by: Fernanda Villeli
- Story by: Félix B. Caignet
- Directed by: Raúl Araiza
- Starring: Verónica Castro; Ignacio López Tarso
- Opening theme: "Ven" by Verónica Castro
- Country of origin: Mexico
- Original language: Spanish
- No. of seasons: 1
- No. of episodes: 95

Production
- Executive producer: Ernesto Alonso
- Production company: Televisa

Original release
- Network: Canal de las Estrellas
- Release: November 2, 1981 – August 31, 1982

Related
- Soledad; Gabriel y Gabriela

El derecho de nacer (English title:The right to be born) is a Mexican telenovela produced by Ernesto Alonso for Televisa in 1981. Based on the Cuban radionovela of the same name written by Félix B. Caignet adapted for TV by Fernanda Villeli and directed by Raúl Araiza.

Verónica Castro and Sergio Jiménez starred as protagonists, Erika Buenfil and Humberto Zurita starred as co-protagonist on their debut, while Ignacio López Tarso, Beatriz Castro and Malena Doria starred as main antagonists. With the participations of the first actresses María Rubio and Socorro Avelar.

== Plot ==
The story begins as a young woman seeks counsel by her doctor after she is left pregnant and debating if she should have an abortion. Her doctor calms her and tells her that he wants to share a story with her before she makes her decision. The doctor's name is Alberto Limonta and he begins recounting the story of the Del Junco family..... Don Rafael Del Junco (Ignacio López Tarso) is the severe patriarch of a respected Veracruz family and demands absolute obedience from his two daughters María Elena and Matilde (real-life sisters Verónica and Beatriz Castro) and his wife Dona Constancia. María Elena manages to have an affair with a traveling salesman named Alfredo Martinez, played by Salvador Pineda. Martinez abandons her after knowing that she is pregnant with his child.

Don Rafael, in all of his fury sends María Elena and her black nanny María Dolores (Socorro Avelar) into hiding to avoid any scandals to his family. The two women are kept prisoners by Bruno, the foreman (Julio César Inbert), who is instructed by Don Rafael to kill the baby as soon as it is born. María Dolores manages to arrange the disappearance of the baby boy and instead flees to Mexico City while the boy Albertico played by Verónica Castro's real-life son Cristian Castro. Albertico Limonta, who took the last name of Maria Dolores, knows nothing about the existence of María Elena.

The storyline has Alberto going back to Veracruz as he takes a job as a resident at the city hospital. It is there where he meets a young girl Amelia, who falls in love with him, but refuses to marry when she learns that Alberto has a black mother. As Alberto decides not to reveal that Maria Dolores is not his real mother, Cristina, a hospital volunteer, played by Erika Buenfil falls in love with him. Cristina is the adopted and grown up daughter of Matilde, who happens to be Alberto's real life aunt.

Alberto develops a relationship with the Del Junco family as Cristina introduces him to everyone. The Del Juncos', with exception of spiteful Matilde are taken by the young man. Maria Elena in fact, feels a special bond for her niece's boyfriend. Maria Elena is by then a nun living in a convent resigned a long time ago to never finding her son and her beloved nana.

A dramatic turn of events happens when Don Rafael del Junco pays an unsuspecting Maria Dolores a visit after he is given an emergency blood transfusion by Alberto. The meeting of these two characters is the paramount event of the entire drama as Maria Dolores reveals to Don Rafael that Doctor Alberto Limonta, the blood donor is in fact the Del Junco heir sent to his death by his own grandfather.

Don Rafael gets home and has a stroke which leaves him immobilized and unable to speak. This ploy prologued the drama for months in which Alberto and Cristina's love story takes a secondary role to the quest by Don Rafael's desire and his inability to tell Maria Elena that Albertico is her son. Maria Elena, eventually meets Maria Dolores who reveals that she had to flee Veracruz to save the child. In a highly emotional episode, Maria Elena, and Maria Dolores tell Alberto the entire truth.

Alberto instead of happiness feels sadness and resentment as he believes that Cristina is his first cousin making them an unlikely pair to marry. It is then when Matilde plagued by remorse and sadness confesses to Cristina that she is adopted; hence, permitting the two to marry. Don Rafael now able to speak, wants Alberto to take the Del Junco name to which Alberto refuses and decides to keep Limonta instead as he had grown up with him.

== Cast ==
- Verónica Castro as María Elena del Junco
- Sergio Jiménez as Jorge Luis Armenteros
- Ignacio López Tarso as Don Rafael del Junco
- María Rubio as Clemencia del Junco
- Humberto Zurita as Alberto Limonta
- Salvador Pineda as Alfredo Martínez
- Socorro Avelar as María Dolores Limonta
- Erika Buenfil as Isabel Cristina del Río
- Beatriz Castro as Matilde del Junco
- Cristian Castro as Alberto (child)
- Malena Doria as Sor Julia
- Laura Flores as Amelia Montero
- Miguel Macía as Alejandro Sierra
- Miguel Ángel Ferriz as Osvaldo Martínez
- Fernando Balzaretti as Ricardo del Río
- Alba Nydia Díaz as Virginia
- Manuel Ojeda as Armando
- Julio César Inbert as Bruno
- Eduardo Liñán as Father Juan
- Flor Trujillo as Magali
- Adriana Lafan as Marina
- Hector Saez as Ramón
- Carlos Ignacio as Raúl
- Roberto Antunez as Alfonso Cabrera
- Martha Patricia as Asunción
- Maristel Molina as Sor Amparo
- Andaluz Russel as Lolita
- José Luis Duvall as Salvador
- Julio Monterde as Nicolás Montero
- Rosalba Hernández as Nurse
- Alberto Parra as Tony
- Jorge del Campo as Pepe
- Macario Álvarez as Lic. Álvarez
- Fabio Ramírez as Uncle Pepe
- Margarita de la O as Josefa
- Silvia Manríquez as Tete
- Lorena Rivero as Gina
- Carmen Rodríguez as Alma
- Adrián Sotomayor as Adrián
- Enrique Mazin as Doctor Jorge
- Patricia Renteria as Rosita
- Félix Santaella as Pedro Reyna
- Norma Herrera as María
- Héctor Suárez as Héctor
- Aurora Medina as Lucía
- Michel Castro as Alberto (newborn)
- José Luis Llamas as Advisor in AA
- María Belzares as Benita
- Lili Garza as Invited
- Beatriz Ornella as Invited
- Melba Luna as Mercedes
- Raquel Pankowsky as Cristina (mother)
- Rigoberto Carmona as Waiter

== Other versions ==
Films

- El derecho de nacer in 1952. Starring Jorge Mistral, Gloria Marín and Martha Roth.
- El derecho de nacer in 1966. Starring Aurora Bautista, Julio Alemán and Maricruz Olivier.

Telenovelas

- El derecho de nacer in 1966. Starring María Teresa Rivas and Enrique Rambal.
- El derecho de nacer in 2001. Starring Kate del Castillo and Saúl Lisazo.

== Awards ==
| Year | Award | Category | Nominee | Result |
|---|---|---|---|---|
| 1983 | 1st TVyNovelas Awards | Best Telenovela of the Year | Ernesto Alonso | Won |
| 1983 | 1st TVyNovelas Awards | Best Actor | Sergio Jiménez | Nominated |
| 1983 | 1st TVyNovelas Awards | Best Antagonist Actor | Ignacio López Tarso | Nominated |
| 1983 | 1st TVyNovelas Awards | Best Female Revelation | Laura Flores | Won |
| 1983 | 1st TVyNovelas Awards | Best Male Revelation | Humberto Zurita | Nominated |
| 1983 | Premios Recalling the 80's | Best Telenovela of decade of the 80's | Ernesto Alonso | Nominated |
| 1983 | Premios Recalling the 80's | Best Telenovela of the '83 | Ernesto Alonso | Won |
| 1983 | Premios Recalling the 80's | Best Actress of the '83 | Verónica Castro | Won |
| 1983 | Premios Recalling the 80's | Best Antagonist Actor of decade of the 80's | Ignacio López Tarso | Nominated |
| 1983 | Premios Recalling the 80's | Best Leading Actor | Ignacio López Tarso | Won |
| 1983 | Premios Recalling the 80's | Best Actor Revelation decade of the 80's | Humberto Zurita | Won |
