= No tienes derecho a juzgarme =

Mexican telenovela

- Genre: Telenovela
- Directed by: José Morris
- Starring: Enrique Rocha
- Country of origin: Mexico
- Original language: Spanish

Production
- Running time: 60 minutes

Original release
- Network: Canal de las Estrellas
- Release: 1979

No tienes derecho a juzgarme (English: You have no right to judge me) is a Mexican telenovela produced by Televisa for Canal de las Estrellas in 1979.

== Cast ==
- Enrique Rocha
- Alberto Insua
- Mary Montiel
- Chela Nájera
- José Baviera
- Eric del Castillo
