= Mañana es primavera =

Mexican telenovela

- Genre: Telenovela
- Created by: Juan Gene; Norberto Vieyra
- Directed by: Sergio Jimenez
- Starring: Silvia Pinal; Gustavo Rojo; Viridiana Alatriste; Ofelia Guilmáin; Norma Lazareno; Gonzalo Vega
- Country of origin: Mexico
- Original language: Spanish

Production
- Executive producer: Silvia Pinal
- Cinematography: Carlos Guerra

Original release
- Network: Canal de las Estrellas
- Release: October 4, 1982

Mañana es primavera (English title: Tomorrow is spring) is a Mexican telenovela produced by Silvia Pinal for Televisa in 1982.

It starred by Silvia Pinal, Gustavo Rojo, Viridiana Alatriste and Ofelia Guilmáin.

== Cast ==
- Silvia Pinal as Amanda Serrano
- Gustavo Rojo as Alfredo
- Viridiana Alatriste as Laura
- Ofelia Guilmáin as Doctor
- Norma Lazareno as Sonia
- Gonzalo Vega as Bruno
- Maria Eugenia Avendaño as Ma. Julia
- Wolf Rubinsky as Raúl
- Connie de la Mora as Emilia
- Rafael Sánchez Navarro as Eduardo
- Ramiro Oliveros as Rodrigo Oliveros
- Lizzeta Romo as Alicia Baena
- Rebecca Rambal as Adriana
- Lily Inclán as Doña Eva
- María Prado as Trini
- Eduardo Palomo as Fernando
- Adriana Parra as Carmen
- Polly as Cecilia

== Awards ==
Year	Award	Category	Nominee	Result
1983	1st TVyNovelas Awards	Best Telenovela of the Year	Silvia Pinal	Nominated
1983	1st TVyNovelas Awards	Best Actress	Silvia Pinal	Won
1983	1st TVyNovelas Awards	Best Male Revelation	Rafael Sánchez Navarro	Won
