= Mi pequeña Soledad =

Mexican telenovela

- Genre: Telenovela; Romance; Drama
- Created by: Jorge Lozano Soriano
- Written by: Marissa Garrido; René Muñoz; Dolores Ortega; Rosario Velicia; Magda Crisantes
- Directed by: Beatriz Sheridan
- Starring: Verónica Castro; Omar Fierro; Salvador Pineda; Antonio De Carlo; Angélica Rivera; Paola Ochoa; Roberto Ballesteros
- Theme music composer: Eduardo Magallanes
- Opening theme: Mi pequeña Soledad by Verónica Castro
- Country of origin: Mexico
- Original language: Spanish
- No. of episodes: 160

Production
- Executive producer: Verónica Castro
- Producers: Angelli Nesma Medina; José Alberto Castro
- Production locations: Mexico City, Mexico
- Cinematography: Ernesto Arreola
- Running time: 21-22 minutes
- Production company: Televisa

Original release
- Network: Canal de las Estrellas
- Release: May 14 – December 21, 1990

Related
- Cuando llega el amor; Cadenas de amargura

Mi pequeña Soledad (My little Soledad) is a Mexican telenovela produced by Verónica Castro for Televisa in 1990.

Verónica Castro starred as protagonist, while Rosa María Bianchi, Salvador Pineda, July Furlong and Roberto Ballesteros starred as antagonists.

== Plot ==
As a young girl, Isadora (Verónica Castro) is voted to become the Silver Queen in Taxco, a Mexican village known for its silver handicrafts. The night before the coronation, in an act of jealousy, Isadora's former boyfriend Gerardo (Salvador Pineda) rapes her. For weeks Isadora refuses to tell anyone, but because of the strong love and trust she feels for her fiancé José Luis (Antonio De Carlo), she decides to tell him about it.

Just before the wedding, Gerardo confronts José Luis and provokes a fight. José Luis never arrives at the church for his wedding, and is later found stabbed to death. Isadora is carrying Gerardo's child, and her stepmother Piedad (Rosa María Bianchi) is terrified that this will force Gerardo to marry her.

Piedad is jealous of Isadora, and decides to get rid of the child at the first opportunity. Isadora leaves her family and moves to the city. Several years later, Soledad (also played by Verónica Castro) has grown into a kind and beautiful woman, and she moves to the city where she and Isadora meet.

== Cast ==
- Verónica Castro as Isadora Fernández Sierra de Arizmendi/Soledad "Sol" Contreras Hidalgo/María Soledad Salazar Fernández
- Omar Fierro as Lic. Carlos Arizmendi
- Salvador Pineda as Gerardo Salazar Ballesteros
- Antonio De Carlo as José Luis Garza
- Angélica Rivera as Marisa Villaseñor
- Paola Ochoa as Malú Contreras
- Roberto Ballesteros as Mateo Villaseñor Lomeli
- Rosa María Bianchi as Piedad Sinisterra Vda De Fernández
- July Furlong Natalia Villaseñor Lomeli
- Carlos Bracho as Hernán Villaseñor Aguirre
- Elsa Cárdenas as Bárbara
- Silvia Caos as Elodia Abascal
- Orlando Carrió as Fernando Abascal
- Mapita Cortés as Blanquita
- Gabriela Goldsmith as Ana Silvia Arizmendi Ventura
- Alicia Fahr as Lidia
- Cecilia Gabriela as Clara
- Ana Bertha Lepe as Lolita Arizmendi
- Rafael Rojas as Lalo
- Roxana Saucedo as Sirena
- Juan Carlos Serrán as Sebastián Díaz
- Edmundo Arizpe
- Rafael Baledón as Don Manuel Fernández
- Alicia del Lago as Pura
- Laura Flores as Dulce María
- Sergio Sendel as Gustavo "Tavo"
- Martha Zamora as Amparo Contreras
- Alberto González as Ernesto
- Javier Herranz as Guido
- Norma Lazareno as Yolanda Salazar Ballesteros
- Alexandra Loretto as Josefina
- Rubén Morales as Alberto
- René Muñoz as Gayetano
- Ricardo Pal as Mario
- Ernesto Rivas as Fay Contreras
- Karen Sentíes as Employee
- Óscar Vallejo as boy in Acapulco
- Juan Zaizar as Employee
- Socorro Bonilla as Toña
- Alexis Ayala as Jorge "Coque" Abascal

== Awards ==
Year	Award	Category	Nominee	Result
1991	9th TVyNovelas Awards	Best Telenovela of the Year	Verónica Castro	Nominated
1991	9th TVyNovelas Awards	Best Actress	Verónica Castro	Won
1991	9th TVyNovelas Awards	Best Antagonist Actress	July Furlong	Won
1991	9th TVyNovelas Awards	Best Antagonist Actress	Rosa María Bianchi	Nominated
1991	9th TVyNovelas Awards	Best Co-lead Actor	Salvador Pineda	Won
1991	9th TVyNovelas Awards	Best Young Lead Actress	Angélica Rivera	Nominated
1991	9th TVyNovelas Awards	Best Young Lead Actor	Rafael Rojas	Nominated
1991	9th TVyNovelas Awards	Best Female Revelation	Paola Ochoa	Nominated
1991	9th TVyNovelas Awards	Best Male Revelation	Orlando Carrió	Nominated

== Theme song ==
- The theme songs is "Mi pequeña Soledad" sung by (Verónica Castro)
- Also in the Telenovela Chiquita Pero Picosa sung by (Verónica Castro)
- This theme song became, and remains, Veronica's signature song.
