= Noris Joffre =

Puerto Rican actress and comedian (born 1966)

Noris Marie Joffre Albuerne (born Theresa Ann Ryan, October 27, 1966) is an American-born Puerto Rican actress and comedian.

Joffre was born Theresa Ann Ryan in Miami, Florida on October 27, 1966. She is the biological child of a Panamanian father, Carlos Guillermo Escalante, who was a Vietnam War veteran, and an Irish mother, Kathleen Messier (née Ryan), who had Joffre when she was 17 years old. Her maternal grandparents forced her mother to give Joffre up for adoption, because she was a minor at the time and because they disapproved of their daughter's relationship with a Latino man. She was adopted by a Cuban family and was raised in Bayamón, Puerto Rico. Her biological parents later formed families of their own, while still being in love with each other. Joffre's biological maternal grandmother later committed suicide after her half-brother was born, out of grief and regret for having forced her daughter to give up for adoption.

She is an actress in both comedy and drama; she took her first steps in Puerto Rican art at the Esther Palés Academy of Varieties and at the Universidad del Sagrado Corazón.

Her professional life has been centered in Puerto Rico, where she may be best known for her comedic depiction of former Governor Sila Calderón. She has worked on local TV stations as well as local theater. She is currently a co-host of a daily daytime show, Entre Nosotras on WAPA-TV. Joffre is married to actor José Brocco.
