= July Furlong =

- Born: Norma Ojeda Furlong; Mexico City, Distrito Federal
- Years active: 1968-1997
- Children: Kathia

Norma Ojeda Furlong is a writer, journalist and former Mexican actress and singer.

Sister of the singer Oscar Athie, she started her career in 1968 in the Mexican TV show La hora de Raúl Astor. Her first role in a telenovela was in 1973. In the 1970s and 1980s, starred in many Mexican films and telenovelas as Mi pequeña Soledad (1990) with Verónica Castro and Muchachitas (1991). Her last TV role was in Al norte del corazón in 1997.

July began a writer and journalist career in 1992. In 2000 write her first political book Testiminios de fin de siglo.

== Films ==
- Mi nombre es Sergio, soy alcohólico (1981)
- Chin Chin el Teporocho (1976)
- Un amor extraño (1975)
- Besos, besos... y más besos (1973)
- Lux aexterna (1973)
- Ya sé quién eres (te he estado observando) (1971)
- El cielo y tú (1971)
- Más allá de la violencia (1971)
- El paletero (1971)
- La agonía de ser madre (1970)
- Las chicas malas del Padre Méndez (1970)
- La guerra de las monjas (1970)
- Los problemas de mamá (1970)
- La puerta y la mujer del carnicero (1968)
- Esta noche sí (1968)

== Telenovelas ==
- Al norte del corazón (1997) .... Marcela
- Con toda el alma'' (1996) .... Doctora
- Muchachitas (1991) .... Verónica Sánchez Zúñiga #1
- Mi pequeña Soledad (1990) .... Natalia
- Ave Fenix (1986) .... Cristina
- Principessa (1984) .... Elina
- Guadalupe (1984) .... Sara
- Por amor (1982) .... Marcia
- Cancionera (1980) .... Paloma
- La llama de tu amor (1979)
- Humillados y ofendidos.... (1977)
- Ven conmigo.... (1975) .... Vicky
- Paloma.... (1975) .... Isabel
- La hiena (1973) .... Rosaura
- El edificio de enfrente (1972)
- El amor tiene cara de mujer (1971) .... Cristina
- Velo de Novia (1971)

== TV shows ==
- Mujer, casos de la vida real (1994)
- Miércoles a go-go
- Orfeón a go-go
- La hora de Raúl Astor
