= Enrique Rocha =

Mexican actor (1940–2021)

- Born: Enrique Miguel Rocha Ruiz; January 5, 1940; Silao, Guanajuato, Mexico
- Died: November 7, 2021 (aged 81); Mexico City, Mexico
- Occupation: Actor
- Years active: 1963–2021

Enrique Rocha (January 5, 1940 – November 7, 2021) was a Mexican actor. He made his debut in the film industry in the film Guadalajara en Verano directed by Julio Bracho in the last decade of the Golden Age of Mexican cinema.

== Filmography ==
=== Television roles ===
Year	Title	Role	Notes
1965	La mentira		
1966	Cristina Guzmán		
1973	La hiena	Marcial García	
1974	Mundo de juguete	Tío Leopoldo "Polo" Balboa	
1975	Satánico Pandemonium	Luzbel/Lucifer	
1977	Marcha nupcial	Fernando	
1979	Vamos juntos	Juan Cristóbal	
1979	No tienes derecho a juzgarme		
1980	Espejismo		
1983	Cuando los hijos se van	Álvaro	
1985	El ángel caído	Álvaro	
1986	Lista negra	Daniel	
1987	Cómo duele callar	Villegas	
1988	Pasión y poder	Eladio Gómez Luna	80 episodes
1988	Hora marcada		Episode: "Concierto para mano izquierda"
1989	Mujer, casos de la vida real		Episode: "Descubrirse"
1990	Yo compro esa mujer	Rodrigo Montes de Oca	140 episodes
1993	Dos mujeres, un camino	Don Ismael Montegarza	
1996	La antorcha encendida	Virrey Félix María Calleja	
1997	Pueblo chico, infierno grande	Ruán	
1997	Mi pequeña traviesa	Antonio	
1999	Serafín	Lucio	
1998–1999	El privilegio de amar	Don Nicolás Obregón	103 episodes
2000	Por un beso	Mariano Díaz de León	98 episodes
2002	Las vías del amor	Don Sebastián Mendoza Romero	112 episodes
2004	Rubí	Narrador	Television film
2004–2006	Rebelde	Don León Bustamante	
2007	Amor sin maquillaje	Steve	25 episodes
2007	Lola, érase una vez	Dios	
2007	Objetos perdidos	Narrador	15 episodes
2009	Verano de amor	Don Víctor Roca	120 episodes
2009–2010	Corazón salvaje	Don Rodrigo Montes de Oca	135 episodes
2011	Una familia con suerte	Don Napoleón Villarreal	
2012–2013	Amores verdaderos	Don Aníbal Balvanera	151 episodes
2014–2015	Muchacha italiana viene a casarse	Don Vittorio	155 episodes
2017	Érase una vez	Narrator	11 episodes
2017–2018	Me declaro culpable	Don Mauro Monroy	Antagonist
