= Irina Baeva =

Russian actress (born 1992)

- Ирина Витальевна Баева
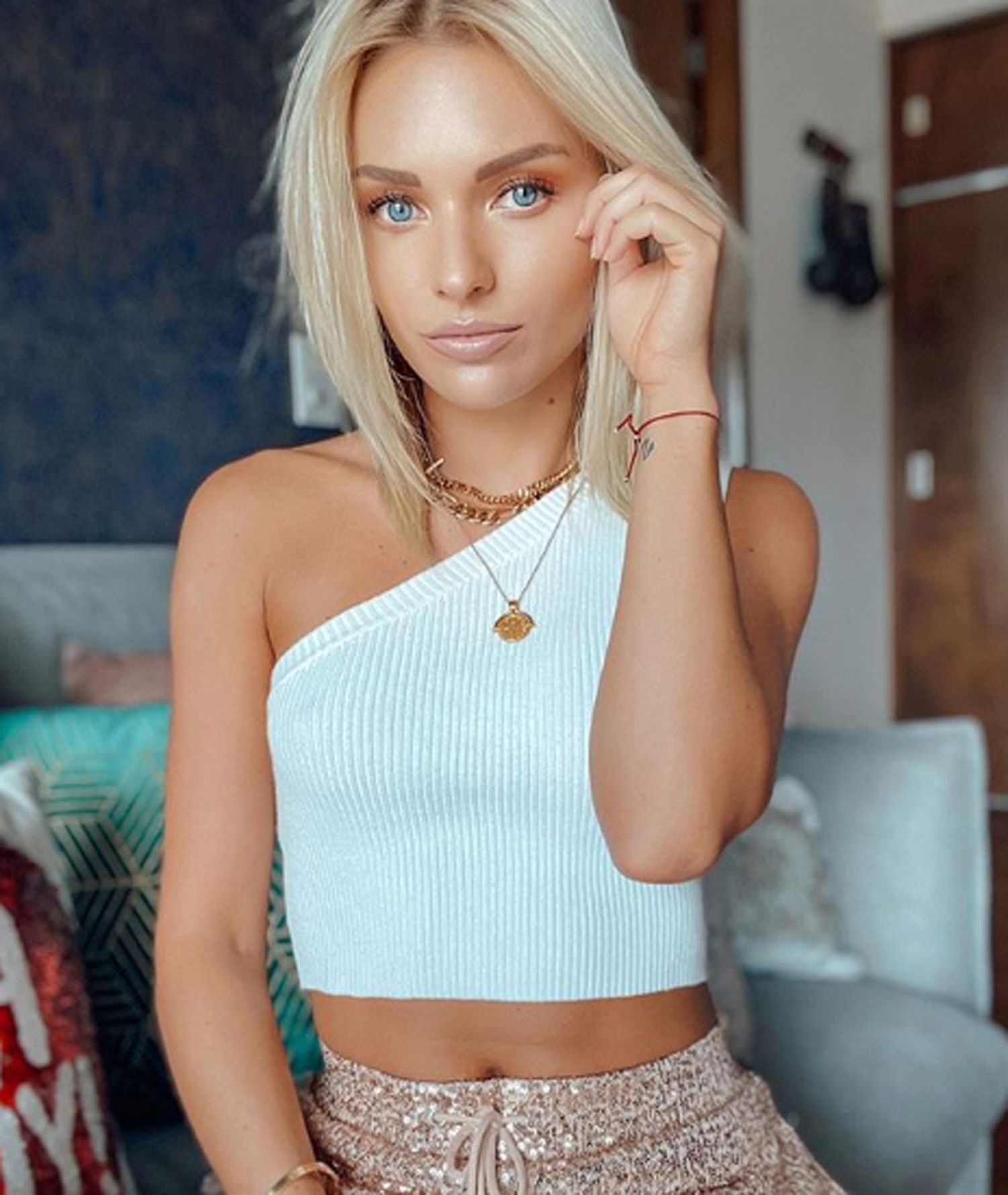
- Born: Irina Vitalevna Baeva; October 25, 1992 (age 33); Moscow, Russia
- Education: Moscow State University
- Occupations: Actress; model
- Years active: 2014–present
- Partner: Gabriel Soto (2018–2024)

Irina Vitalevna Baeva (Russian: Ирина Витальевна Баева; born October 25, 1992) is a Russian actress and model best known for her roles in Mexican telenovelas.

== Biography ==
Baeva completed her primary and secondary education in Moscow, Russia. She studied Spanish, and learned to speak watching Mexican telenovelas. She also studied Journalism and Public Relations at Moscow State University, but left her studies to move to Mexico City.

== Career ==
In 2012, Baeva moved to Mexico City to study acting at the Centro de Educación Artística (CEA) of Televisa. Her debut on the small screen was in the telenovela Muchacha italiana viene a casarse, where she shared credits with Livia Brito and José Ron. In 2015, Baeva was cast in the telenovela Pasión y poder, produced by José Alberto Castro, where she portrayed the role of Daniela Montenegro, for which she received a nomination at the 34th TVyNovelas Awards for Best Female Revelation. In 2016, Baeva starred as the main protagonist of the telenovela Vino el amor with Gabriel Soto.

== Filmography ==
Film performance
Year	Title	Role	Notes
2022	Valentino, Be Your Own Hero or Villain	Sarah Marure	

Television performance
Title	Year	Role	Notes
Muchacha italiana viene a casarse	2015	Katia Ruiz	Recurring role; 13 episodes
Pasión y poder	2015–2016	Daniela Montenegro Pérez	Supporting role; 126 episodes
Vino el amor	2016–2017	Luciana Muñoz Estrada	Lead role; 139 episodes
Renta congelada	2017	Daniela "Danny"	Episode: "De chile, dulce y pozole"
40 y 20	2017	Masha	Episode: "El club de los 33"
Me declaro culpable	2017-2018	Natalia Urzúa Monroy	Main role; 62 episodes
El Dragón: Return of a Warrior	2019–2020	Jimena Ortiz	Main role; 73 episodes
Soltero con hijas	2019–2020	Masha Simonova	Main role; 87 episodes
Amor dividido	2022	Debra Puig	Main role; 107 episodes
Nadie como tú	2023-2024	Romina Ortuño Vieri	Main role
La historia de Juana	2024	Paula Fuenmayor	Main role
¿Quién es la máscara?	2024	Camilo Mandrilo	Season 6 contestant
Tan cerca de ti, nace el amor	2026	Kassandra	
