= Cuando los hijos se van (TV series) =

- Genre: Telenovela; Drama
- Written by: Norberto Vieyra
- Directed by: Héctor Bonilla
- Starring: Saby Kamalich; Raúl Ramírez; Alejandro Camacho; Enrique Rocha; Silvia Pasquel; Anabel Ferreira; Roberto Ballesteros
- Country of origin: Mexico
- Original language: Spanish

Production
- Executive producer: Silvia Pinal
- Production company: Televisa

Original release
- Network: Canal de las Estrellas
- Release: 1983 – 1983

Related
- Gabriel y Gabriela; Bodas de odio; Cuando los hijos se van (1941 film) Cuando los hijos se van (1968 film)

Cuando los hijos se van (English title: When the kids leave) is a Mexican telenovela produced by Silvia Pinal for Televisa in 1983.

Saby Kamalich and Raúl Ramírez starred as protagonists, while Roberto Ballesteros starred as main antagonist.

== Plot ==
Julio and Francisca have a strong marriage and five grown children, and there lies the problems (in their children):

When she was young and naive, Teresa fell in love with Álvaro, a married man, but 10 years later can't maintain the facade in front of the family, and confesses everything. Even though she tries to leave Álvaro, she can't because her love is true and completely reciprocated.

Kiko, another son, uses and abuses Susana's love, who loves him dearly. He turns his back to love, only to receive Susana's financial support, and then becomes the hunted hunter as he ends up falling in love with her. But Kiko has made too many mistakes in his life, and thinks it would be unfair for Susana to tie herself to a man like him.

Hilda has a perfect romance: she loves Jorge, a good young, professional man who is very proper. She has a white wedding and an irreproachable life.

For Ignacio, love means working things out with himself. He gains confidence in himself and begins to resolve his terrible inferiority complex. And then there is Claudia, the girl who loves him for his beautiful spirit.

Maria Graciela is in love for the first time, with Ricardo. She is all passionate kisses, languishing glances, loud sighs and childish tantrums, but is it really love or infatuation?

== Cast ==
- Saby Kamalich as Francisca Mendoza
- Raúl Ramírez as Julio Mendoza
- Silvia Pasquel as Teresa Mendoza
- Enrique Rocha as Álvaro
- Alejandro Camacho as Ignacio Mendoza
- Anabel Ferreira as Hilda Mendoza
- Roberto Ballesteros as Julio Francisco "Kiko" Mendoza
- Rosenda Monteros as Aunt Elvira
- Margarita Sanz as Rebeca
- Mónica Prado as Susana
- Mercedes Olea as María Graciela Mendoza
- Jorge Pais as Damián
- Crystal as Claudia
- Claudio Báez as Jorge Guerra
- Demián Bichir as Ricardo
- Simone Brook as Martha
- Eloísa Capdevilla as Doña Matilde
- Deborah Conde as Dominga
- Alfonso Barclay as Alfonso
- Alejandra Guzmán as Alejandra
- Luis Enrique Guzmán as Chito
- Raúl Marcelo as Abel
- Carmen Rodríguez as Diana
- Lucero Lander as Lolita
- Uriel Chávez as Vicente
- Judith Velasco Herrera as Vicente's wife
- Sara Guasch
