= XE-TU =

Mexican television series

- Created by: Reynaldo López
- Presented by: René Casados
- Country of origin: Mexico
- No. of seasons: 6

Production
- Executive producer: Carla Estrada
- Producer: Reynaldo López
- Running time: About 30 minutes

Original release
- Network: Canal de las Estrellas
- Release: 1982 – 1987

XE-TU was a Spanish-language television program broadcast by Televisa in Mexico from 1982 to 1987. It was created by Reynaldo López and produced by Carla Estrada.

== Format ==
XE-TU was a variety weekly show, which had contests, music and entertainment acts, which was hosted by René Casados, Erika Buenfil, Victoria Ruffo, Gabriela Rivero, Marcela Páez, Daniel Martín, Jorge Alberto Aguilera, Roxana de Antuñano, Adela Noriega, Gabriela Michel, among others. It had a duration of half an hour and it became a very popular program in the youth segment.

The program was broadcast from Monday to Friday at 7:00 p.m. through the Canal de las Estrellas (channel 2). Several music and acting Mexican stars emerged from the show.

Casados at the beginning of the broadcasts, would say as part of his greeting "always smile and the force will be with you", which was a catch phrase that became popular in Mexico during those years.

Some of the contests names were: "The girl XE-TU", where the young winner participated all week doing spots in the program. "Your possible dream", where the guest actress or actor was separated by a wall from the three contestants, and therefore cannot be seen, would ask them questions to finally decide with whom they most identify and thus gain the opportunity to spend a full day together. "Sing, Sing", where the participants put their skills as a singer to the test, helping to discover artists such as Fey and Edith Márquez. "Traveling with XE-TU", consisted of two teams formed by four contestants each, which competed to answer questions of general culture, and where the invited musical artist became part of the program's host team.

Celebrities were invited such as: Miguel Bosé, Luis Miguel, José José, Hombres G, Daniela Romo, Lucía Méndez, Emmanuel, Miguel Ríos, Parchís, Timbiriche, Manuel Mijares, Massiel, Flans, Sombrero Verde, among others.

== Legacy ==
Televisa did a remake of XE-TU with Gloria Trevi as the host, which was called "XE-TU Remix" and lasted from September 16, 1996, to January 3, 1997; however, it could never reach the ratings and popularity of the original show.
