= El amor nunca muere (TV series) =

- Genre: Telenovela
- Created by: Caridad Bravo Adams
- Written by: Violante Villamil
- Directed by: Alfredo Saldaña
- Starring: Christian Bach; Frank Moro; Silvia Pasquel
- Country of origin: Mexico
- Original language: Spanish
- No. of episodes: 195

Production
- Executive producer: Ernesto Alonso
- Cinematography: Ramón Gama
- Running time: 21–22 minutes

Original release
- Network: Canal de las Estrellas
- Release: 1982 – 1983

Related
- La mentira (1952 film); La mentira (1965); Calúnia (1966); La mentira (1970 film); La mentira (1998); El juramento (2008); Cuando me enamoro (2010); Lo imperdonable (2015)

El amor nunca muere (English title: Love Never Dies) is a Mexican telenovela produced by Ernesto Alonso for Televisa in 1982. Is an adaptation of the work of Caridad Bravo Adams entitled La mentira.

Christian Bach and Frank Moro starred as protagonists, while Silvia Pasquel and Rebecca Jones starred as main antagonists.

== Cast ==
- Christian Bach as Cecilia
- Frank Moro as Guillermo
- Silvia Pasquel as Carolina
- Aarón Hernán as Teodoro
- Emilia Carranza as Sara
- Tony Bravo as José Beltran
- Olivia Buzzio as Gloria
- Mario Cid as Father Marcial
- Eduardo Yáñez as Alfonso
- Guillermo Aguilar as Duval
- Laura León as Azucena
- Rebecca Jones as Mary Ann
- Francisco Avendaño as Ricardo
- Fabio Ramírez as Santiago
- Aurora Cortes as Nana Gume
- Fernando Sainz as Ronnie
- Ignacio Rubiell as Genaro
- Tito Duran as Julio
- Bárbara Córcega as Zakuk
- Juan Diego as Tobi

== Awards ==
Year	Award	Category	Nominee	Result
1983	1st TVyNovelas Awards	Best Actress	Christian Bach	Nominated
1983	1st TVyNovelas Awards	Best Antagonist Actress	Silvia Pasquel	Won
