= Carlos Rivera =

Mexican singer (born 1986)

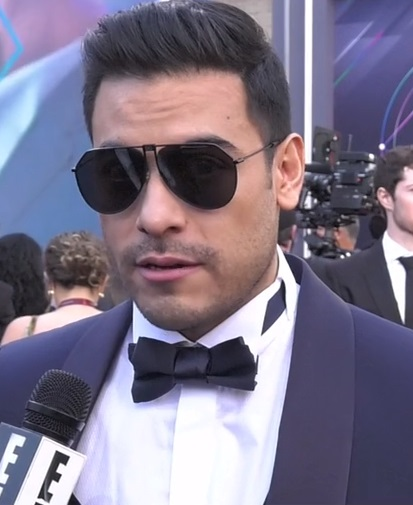
- Rivera in 2021
- Born: Carlos Rivera Guerra; March 15, 1986 (age 39); Huamantla, Tlaxcala, Mexico
- Spouse: Cynthia Rodríguez (m. 2022)
- Musical career
- Genres: Pop, Latin, Mariachi, Musical
- Occupations: Singer, actor, songwriter
- Years active: 2004–present
- Label: Sony BMG
- Website: carlosrivera.com.mx

Carlos Augusto Rivera Guerra (born March 15, 1986) is a Mexican singer who rose to fame by winning the third generation of La Academia. He has released four studio albums and participated in six theatre productions.

== Early life ==
Rivera was born March 15, 1986, in Huamantla, Tlaxcala, Mexico. His wit made him a hometown celebrity from a young age, and continued after winning singing competitions and hosting a radio show on Radio Huamantla. His big break came in 2004. After many try-outs and auditions, he garnered a spot in the reality television singing competition La Academia, produced by TV Azteca. After a series of challenges and critiques, including solos and duets, Rivera won over 80% of the votes from the judges and was crowned the winner for season three. After the win, Rivera was named "Huamantla's Favorite Son", by members of Huamatla's City Council.

== Career ==
In 2005, he signed with Sony Music and began working on a self-titled album. That year he recorded "Y Si tu Supieras" for the feature film Mar de Sueños. The song was nominated for Best Original Song at the 2006 Diosas de Plata, an annual Mexican award ceremony hosted by the Mexican Film Journalism Association.

While working on the album, Rivera worked in theater. In 2006, he starred in the musical Besame Mucho, and the following year performed in Orgasmos La Comedia. By 2008, at 22 years old, Rivera had become the world's youngest actor to play the male lead in Beauty and the Beast, the first major Broadway-like production produced by Disney in Mexico.

Rivera starred in his fourth theater production, Mamma Mia! in 2009. The project garnered him a nomination in the Best Co-Actor of the Year category by the Association of Journalists Theater.

His second studio album, Mexicano, was recorded in 2010 and like its predecessor, which includes hits like "Te me vas" and "No soy el aire," it was certified gold. The project was produced by Kiko Campos.

=== The Lion King ===
In 2011, Rivera became the first Mexican actor to star in a Disney production outside of Mexico.

Over the next two years, more than a million people saw Rivera in the role of Simba. He sold out approximately 700 shows at the Lope de Vega Theater on the famous Gran Via de Madrid, and won Best New Actor at the 2012 Broadway World Spain Awards.

In 2013, Rivera focused on his last Lion King production and the release of his third studio album, El hubiera no existe. The album, which was certified gold in Mexico, was also released in Spain, Argentina, Venezuela, Central America and Portugal.

=== El Hubiera No Existe ===
El Hubiera No Existe marked the beginning of collaborations with Mario Dom, Franco De Vita, Leonel García and Pablo Preciado. The album produced a hits including "Fascinación," "Solo Tú," "Gracias a ti," "El hubiera no existe," "Por ti," "Que fue de nuestra vida," a duet with De Vita, and "No deben marchitar" with India Martinez.

Rivera's world tour, the "El Hubiera No Existe Tour," produced 60 sold-out shows in cities including Madrid, Barcelona, Valencia, Buenos Aires and Guadalajara.

=== 2014– ===
In 2014, Rivera participated as a judge in Spain's version of The Voice. That same year he celebrated 10 years as an artist and released a live album, Con Ustedes... Carlos Rivera En Vivo, recorded during his second performance at the Teatro Metropólitan in Mexico City.

In 2015, Rivera joined the Lion King cast again, in Mexico, where the project was the highest grossing in the country's history.

Rivera performed in more than 300 shows from 2015 to 2016, and combined with Spain's production, he acted in over 1,000 theater shows, enjoyed by approximately 1.4 million guests.

He is the only actor in the world to have starred in two original Disney productions of The Lion King, and the only protagonist to record on two soundtracks, as well as participating in the lyric adaptation of the original songs for the Spanish version.

In 2016, Rivera costarred in the telenovela El hotel de los secretos, produced by Televisa. In February, he released his fourth studio album, Yo Creo, which debuted at number1 in AMPROFON's Top Sales Chart in Mexico and No. 1 on iTunes’ General Chart in Spain.

Rivera recorded a song for the Argentinian soap opera Los ricos no piden permiso.

Rivera has collaborated with artists including the late Juan Gabriel, Maluma, Banda el Recodo, Thalía, José José, Pandora, Reyli Barba, Ana Torroja, Marta Sánchez, Franco De Vita, Ana Carolina and Daniel Boaventura (Brazil), Paulo Gonzo (Portugal), Abel Pintos (Argentina), Laura Pausini (Italy) and India Martínez (Spain).

== Filmography ==
List of appearances and roles in feature films and television
Year	Title	Role	Notes
2010	Héroes verdaderos	Carlos Navarro	Voice role
2016	El hotel de los secretos	Andrés Salinas	80 episodes
2019	El rey león	Simba adulto	Voice/Singing Role
2020	Yo vivo: Documental	El mismo	Protagonista
2020	A Celebration of the Music of Coco	Himself	Recording of live concert at the Hollywood Bowl

== Awards ==
Premios TVyNovelas

Year	Category	Nominated works	Result
2017	Best Co-lead Actor	El hotel de los secretos	Won
2017	Best Male Revelation	El hotel de los secretos	Won

- First place in the third generation of La Academia (US$270,000) (2004)
- Award from the teachers' union of Tlaxcala (2005)
- Mexican President Enrique Peña Nieto presented Rivera with the Artistic Merit Award at the Premios Antena.

== Discography ==
=== Studio albums ===
- 2007: Carlos Rivera
- 2010: Mexicano
- 2013: El Hubiera No Existe
- 2016: Yo Creo
- 2018: Guerra
- 2020: Si Fuera Mia EP
- 2021: Crónicas de una Guerra
- 2021: Leyendas Vol. 1
- 2023: Sincerándome
- 2025: ¿Qué Significa El Amor?

=== As lead artist ===
List of singles as lead artist, with selected chart positions and certifications, showing year released and album name
Title	Year	Peak chart positions						Certifications	Album
Title	Year	MEX	ARG	COL	SPA	US Latin	US Latin Pop	Certifications	Album
"Y si tu supieras"	2006	—	—	—	—	—	—		Carlos Rivera
"Te me vas"	2006	—	—	—	—	—	—		Carlos Rivera
"La Malagueña"	2010	—	—	—	—	—	—		Mexicano
"Amar y Vivir"	2011	—	—	—	—	—	—		Non-album single
"Fascinación"	2013	—	—	—	43	—	—		El Hubiera No Existe
"Sólo Tú"	2014	—	—	—	38	—	—		El Hubiera No Existe
"¿Cómo Pagarte?"	2015	—	—	—	—	—	—		Yo Creo
"Quedarme Aquí"	2015	—	—	—	—	—	—		Yo Creo
"Que Lo Nuestro Se Quede Nuestro"	2016	—	—	—	—	—	—		Yo Creo
"Por Si Volvieras" (with José Luis Rodríguez)	2017	—	—	—	—	—	—		Inmenso
"Lo Digo" (featuring Gente de Zona)	2017	30	—	27	—	—	—		Yo Creo
"Maldito Miedo" (with Banda El Recodo)	2017	—	—	—	—	—	—		Non-album single
"No Voy a Cambiarte" (with Marcela Morelo)	2017	—	—	—	—	—	—		Los 20 de Morelo
"Cielito Lindo"	2018	—	—	—	—	—	—		Non-album single
"La solución" (with Laura Pausini)	2018	—	—	—	40	—	—		Fatti sentire ancora
"Qué Ironía" (with Thalía)	2019	—	—	—	—	—	—		Valiente
"El Destino" (with Natalia Jiménez)	2019	—	—	—	—	—	—		México de Mi Corazón
"O Holy Night" (with Natalia Jiménez)	2019	—	—	—	—	—	—		Non-album singles
"Noche de Paz" (with Yuri and Arthur Hanlon)	2019	—	—	—	—	—	—		Non-album singles
"El Niño del Tambor"	2019	—	—	—	—	—	—		Non-album singles
"Perdiendo la Cabeza" (with Becky G and Pedro Capo)	2020	1	39	7	— (Note: "Perdiendo la Cabeza" did not chart on the Spanish Singles chart, though did peak at number 24 on the Spanish Airplay chart.)	— (Note: "Perdiendo la Cabeza" did not chart on the Billboard Hot Latin Songs, though did peak at number 22 on the Latin Pop Airplay chart.)	22	AMPROFON: Platinum+Gold	Crónicas de una Guerra
"Ya Pasará"	2020	—	—	—	—	—	—		Crónicas de una Guerra
"100 Años" (with Maluma)	2020	1	—	29	—	38	—		Crónicas de una Guerra
"—" denotes a recording that did not chart or was not released in that territory.

=== As featured artist ===
Year	Song	Album
2019	Empecemos A Vivir" (Gian Marco featuring Carlos Rivera)	Intuición

== Theatre ==
- 2006: Bésame Mucho
- 2007: Orgasmos La Comedia
- 2008: La Bella y la Bestia
- 2009: Mamma Mia!
- 2011: El Rey León (Spain)
- 2015: El Rey León (México)

== Sources ==
- Profile at the La Academia site (in Spanish)
- Official website
- CarlosRivera.com.mx/foro Official Forum (in Spanish)
