= Lista negra =

- Genre: Telenovela; Drama
- Created by: Carlos Enrique Taboada
- Directed by: Julio Castillo
- Starring: Eduardo Palomo; Luz María Jerez; Enrique Rocha; Magda Guzmán; Juan Antonio Edwards; Tony Carbajal; Lilia Michel
- Country of origin: Mexico
- Original language: Spanish

Production
- Executive producer: Francisco Burillo
- Cinematography: Gilberto Macin
- Production company: Televisa

Original release
- Network: Canal de las Estrellas
- Release: 1986 – 1987

Related
- Seducción

Lista negra (English title:Black list) is a Mexican telenovela produced by Francisco Burillo for Televisa in 1986. It is an original story by Carlos Enrique Taboada and directed by Julio Castillo.

Eduardo Palomo and Luz María Jerez starred as protagonists, while Enrique Rocha starred as main antagonist.

== Plot ==
Hugo Lauri is a reporter investigating the murder of a woman while traveling aboard the luxury yacht "Ulysses". Ten years earlier, the yacht left Puerto Vallarta, full of rich passengers. The maiden voyage of "Ulysses" was intended to start a business of tours with yacht passengers as potential customers. However, the tranquility of the trip ended when Nora Capelli, a girl on board crashed into the sea and drowned.

Although the circumstances of his death were shrouded in mystery, the police closed the case and filed it as a tragic accident. Now, Hugo is determined to clarify the case. However, several wealthy and influential people start dying, and Hugo discovers that all these people were passing on board the "Ulysses".

== Cast ==
- Eduardo Palomo as Hugo Lauri
- Luz María Jerez as Violeta
- Enrique Rocha as Daniel
- Magda Guzmán as Angélica
- Juan Antonio Edwards as Simón
- Tony Carbajal as Pablo
- Lilia Michel as Leonora
- Rolando de Castro as Octavio
- Gerardo Murguía
- Emma Teresa Armendáriz as Doña Trini
- Jorge Mateos as Don Joaquín
- Claudia Ramírez as Nora Capelli
- Héctor Sáez as César
- Edith González as Mary
- Jorge Fink as Chano
- Miguel Priego as Ricardo
- Mauricio Davison as Teodoro
- Karla Lárraga as Blanca
- Cristina Peñalver as Mercedes
- Gilberto Macín
- Javier Ernez
- Pedro Zavala as Agustín Roel
