= El hotel de los secretos =

Mexican telenovela

- Genre: Telenovela
- Created by: María Renée Prudencio Mier
- Written by: Gerardo Pérez Zermeño; Carmen Madrid; Carlos Pascual
- Story by: Ramón Campos; Gema R. Neira
- Directed by: Francisco Franco; Ana Lorena Pérez-Ríos
- Creative director: Jimena Galeotti
- Starring: Irene Azuela; Erick Elías; Diana Bracho; Daniela Romo
- Opening theme: "El hotel de los secretos"
- Composer: Eduardo Murguía Pedraza
- No. of seasons: 1
- No. of episodes: 80

Production
- Executive producer: Roberto Gómez Fernández
- Producer: Silvia Cano
- Cinematography: Manuel Barajas; Vivián Sánchez Ross; Daniel Ferrer
- Editors: Juan José Segundo; Julio Abreu
- Camera setup: Multi-camera
- Production company: Televisa

Original release
- Network: Univision
- Release: January 25 – May 20, 2016

Related
- Gran Hotel

El hotel de los secretos is a Mexican telenovela produced by Roberto Gómez Fernández for Televisa. It is an adaptation of the Spanish series Gran Hotel, created by Ramón Campos and Gema R. Neira.

The series stars Irene Azuela, Erick Elías, Diana Bracho and Daniela Romo.

== Plot ==
The series begins with the chance encounter of two strangers on a train. Even though Isabel Alarcón (Irene Azuela) comes from a wealthy family and Julio Olmedo (Erick Elías) doesn't even have a hat of his own, much less the money to buy a ticket, there is a lot of chemistry between them from the start.

They part as abruptly as they met, with no hope of seeing each other again. Julio continues on foot to the Gran Hotel, where he hopes to find his sister, Cristina (Ximena Herrera). Upon arrival, he learns that she has been fired from her job and has subsequently disappeared. Julio senses that something is wrong and, in order to investigate, he manages to get hired as a waiter at the establishment.

Meanwhile, to his surprise, Isabel arrives at the hotel and it is revealed that she is the daughter of Doña Teresa (Diana Bracho), the stern Alarcón matriarch and owner of the place.

Behind a dignified and prosperous façade, Doña Teresa's family hides abundant dark secrets. The upcoming episodes tell a sordid story of deceit, family intrigue, ghosts of the past, betrayal and even murder, all centered on the very respectable and elegant Gran Hotel. As the world seems to crumble around them, Julio and Isabel must overcome class differences, social prejudices and family loyalties, as well as their own past, while fighting for their great love.

== Cast ==
=== Main ===
- Irene Azuela as Isabel Alarcón
- Erick Elías as Julio Olmedo
- Diana Bracho as Teresa de Alarcón
- Daniela Romo as Ángela Gómez

=== Also main ===
- Jorge Poza as Diego Montejo
- Carlos Rivera as Andrés Salinas
- Dominika Paleta as Sofía Alarcón
- Alejandro de la Madrid as Alfredo Vergara
- Ilse Salas as Belén García
- Pablo Cruz-Guerrero as Felipe Alarcón
- Jesús Ochoa as Detective Serapio Ayala
- Eduardo España as Dagoberto Suárez
- Juan Carlos Barreto as Lupe
- Luis Gatica as Genaro
- Claudia Ríos as Melibea
- Regina Blandón as Matilde Salaberri
- Josh Gutiérrez as Jacinto
- Arantza Ruiz as Violeta
- Silvia Mariscal as Elisa
- Luis Couturier as Benjamín Nieto
- Queta Lavat as Mrs. Limantour
- Juan Ferrara as Lázaro

=== Recurring and guest stars ===
- Yam Acevedo as Leonora
- Antonio Alcántara as Cornelio Valladares
- Rafael Amador as Dr. Vallejo
- Antón Araiza as Father Alfonso
- Moisés Arizmendi as Olegario
- Paloma Arredondo as Micaela
- Francisco Avendaño as Judge Fausto Barreda
- Elizabeth Ávila as Soledad
- Odín Ayala as Melesio Arenas
- Carlos Barragán as Don Carlos
- Fernanda Borches as Jorge Arenas / Manuela Arenas
- Pablo Bracho as Justo Olmedo
- Benny Bucio as Melquiades Arenas
- Víctor Carpinteiro as Pablo Salinas
- Horacio Castelo as Doctor
- Sofía Castro as Eugenia
- Omar Ceballos as Witness
- Daniel Chávez Camacho as Driver
- Quetzalli Cortés as Soldier 1
- Marcia Coutiño as Beatriz
- Marisol del Olmo as Emma
- Sergio Gallardo as Mateo
- Antonio Gallegos as Miguel Arenas
- Mauricio García Lozano as Conductor Alcalá
- Nuria Gil as Remedios
- Lucía Guilmáin as Doña Consuelo Escandón
- Daniel Haddad as Pierre Paulet
- Ximena Herrera as Cristina Olmedo
- Alexander Hotlmann as Gumaro Rangel
- Ilse Ikeda as Natalia
- Alonso Iñíguez as Lauro
- Pilar Ixquic Mata as Doña Juana
- Manuel Jiménez Fraire as Miner
- Marlene Kalb as Victoria
- Eduardo Liñán as Evaristo
- Esteban Maggio as Esteban Alcázar
- Montserrat Marañón as María Reyes
- Mario Molina as Mailman
- José Elías Moreno as Judge
- Mahoalli Nassourou as Cordelia
- David Orci as Telegraphist
- Ariane Pellicer as Helena
- María Penella as Rocío
- Gonzalo Peña as Ignacio
- Álex Perea as Gabriel
- Claudia Ramírez as Cecilia Gaitán
- Edsa Ramírez as Clara
- Christian Ramos as Cipriano
- Laura Rincón as Hotel guest
- Hernán Romo as Mariano Arenas
- Joan Santos as Feliciano
- Bárbara Singer as Mercedes
- Enrique Singer as Don Rómulo Alarcón
- Juan Verduzco as Javier
- Erwin Veytia as Garrido
- Adrián Villanueva as Adrián
- Rodrigo Virago as Pascual
- Santiago Zenteno as Cristóbal

== Production ==
Production began on October 26, 2015 at Televisa San Ángel's Studio 10 and concluded on May 16, 2016. The production team and cast spent seven months filming the soap opera.

The series was shot using cinematographic techniques and the directors of photography were Luis García and Diego Tenorio; the stage direction was under the responsibility of Francisco Franco and Ana Lorena Pérez-Ríos.

250 people worked on the costumes, creating more than 13,000 pieces.

=== Development ===
The series is set in Mexico at the beginning of the 20th century. The main setting for the telenovela was a neoclassical building constructed in 1910 and at the time home to the largest psychiatric hospital in Mexico.

La Castañeda, currently located in Amecameca, State of Mexico, was the main location for the development of the telenovela. The Santa María Regla Hacienda, situated in Hidalgo, was the setting that was primarily adapted for the town that appeared in the series. To create the fictional town of San Cristóbal Tlaxico, settings such as a bar, offices, a brothel, a bakery, a telegraph office, a pharmacy, a market, the seamstress's house, a store and street vendors were recreated.

The series was filmed in various locations such as: Mexico City, Morelos, Hidalgo, the State of Mexico, Aguascalientes and Televisa San Ángel studios.

== Music ==
El hotel de los secretos

Soundtrack album by Various artists
- Released: June 21, 2016
- Recorded: 2015–2016
- Label: Fonarte Latino

The soundtrack is titled the same as the soap opera and was released on June 21, 2016, under the Fonarte Latino record label.

=== Track listing ===
No.	Title	Length
1.	"El hotel de los secretos" (Jorge Eduardo Murguía, Mauricio L. Arriaga and Ricardo Larrea)	1:32
2.	"Lugar mágico" (Jorge Eduardo Murguía, Mauricio L. Arriaga and Ricardo Larrea)	2:20
3.	"Emociones encontradas" (Jorge Eduardo Murguía, Mauricio L. Arriaga and Ricardo Larrea)	1:28
4.	"Tensiones y engaños" (Jorge Eduardo Murguía, Mauricio L. Arriaga and Ricardo Larrea)	2:31
5.	"Mentiras" (Jorge Eduardo Murguía, Mauricio L. Arriaga and Ricardo Larrea)	1:35
6.	"Asesinato y muerte" (Jorge Eduardo Murguía, Mauricio L. Arriaga and Ricardo Larrea)	1:39
7.	"Investigadores" (Jorge Eduardo Murguía, Mauricio L. Arriaga and Ricardo Larrea)	1:43
8.	"Interesada" (Jorge Eduardo Murguía, Mauricio L. Arriaga and Ricardo Larrea)	1:51
9.	"Enamorados" (Jorge Eduardo Murguía, Mauricio L. Arriaga and Ricardo Larrea)	2:01
10.	"El tren del pueblo" (Jorge Eduardo Murguía, Mauricio L. Arriaga and Ricardo Larrea)	1:47
11.	"Travesuras románticas" (Jorge Eduardo Murguía, Mauricio L. Arriaga and Ricardo Larrea)	1:10
12.	"Sensualidad" (Jorge Eduardo Murguía, Mauricio L. Arriaga and Ricardo Larrea)	1:28
13.	"Peleas y apuestas" (Jorge Eduardo Murguía, Mauricio L. Arriaga and Ricardo Larrea)	1:12
14.	"Tomando el control" (Jorge Eduardo Murguía, Mauricio L. Arriaga and Ricardo Larrea)	1:45
15.	"El hotel de los secretos (Segunda temporada)" (Jorge Eduardo Murguía, Mauricio L. Arriaga and Ricardo Larrea)	1:19
16.	"Buscando culpables" (Jorge Eduardo Murguía, Mauricio L. Arriaga and Ricardo Larrea)	2:37
17.	"Peligro y escape" (Jorge Eduardo Murguía, Mauricio L. Arriaga and Ricardo Larrea)	1:36
18.	"Dolor y soledad" (Jorge Eduardo Murguía, Mauricio L. Arriaga and Ricardo Larrea)	2:21
19.	"Amor verdadero" (Jorge Eduardo Murguía, Mauricio L. Arriaga and Ricardo Larrea)	2:07
20.	"Alegría y dicha" (Jorge Eduardo Murguía, Mauricio L. Arriaga and Ricardo Larrea)	1:29
21.	"Dulzura y cariño" (Jorge Eduardo Murguía, Mauricio L. Arriaga and Ricardo Larrea)	2:04
22.	"Juntos para siempre" (Jorge Eduardo Murguía, Mauricio L. Arriaga and Ricardo Larrea)	1:40
23.	"Seducción e intriga" (Jorge Eduardo Murguía, Mauricio L. Arriaga and Ricardo Larrea)	1:14
24.	"Misterios ocultos" (Jorge Eduardo Murguía, Mauricio L. Arriaga and Ricardo Larrea)	2:08
25.	"El hotel de los secretos (Resumen)" (Jorge Eduardo Murguía, Mauricio L. Arriaga and Ricardo Larrea)	1:28

== Awards and nominations ==
Year	Award	Category	Nominated	Result
2016	TV Adicto Golden Awards	Best Actress in a TV Series	Diana Bracho	Won
2016	TV Adicto Golden Awards	Best TV Series	El hotel de los secretos	Won
2017	TVyNovelas Awards	Best Telenovela	Roberto Gomez Fernandez	Nominated
2017	TVyNovelas Awards	Best Actress	Irene Azuela	Nominated
2017	TVyNovelas Awards	Best Actor	Erick Elías	Nominated
2017	TVyNovelas Awards	Best Antagonist Actress	Diana Bracho	Nominated
2017	TVyNovelas Awards	Best Antagonist Actor	Jorge Poza	Nominated
2017	TVyNovelas Awards	Best Leading Actress	Daniela Romo	Nominated
2017	TVyNovelas Awards	Best Leading Actor	Jesús Ochoa	Nominated
2017	TVyNovelas Awards	Best Co-lead Actress	Ilse Salas	Nominated
2017	TVyNovelas Awards	Best Co-lead Actor	Carlos Rivera	Won
2017	TVyNovelas Awards	Best Supporting Actor	Eduardo España	Nominated
2017	TVyNovelas Awards	Best Young Lead Actor	Josh Gutiérrez	Nominated
2017	TVyNovelas Awards	Best Female Revelation	Regina Blandón	Nominated
2017	TVyNovelas Awards	Best Male Revelation	Carlos Rivera	Won
2017	TVyNovelas Awards	Best Original Story or Adaptation	María Renée Prudencio Mier	Nominated
2017	TVyNovelas Awards	Best Direction	Francisco Franco; Ana Lorena Pérez-Ríos	Nominated
2017	TVyNovelas Awards	Best Direction of the Cameras	Vivián Sánchez Ross; Manuel Barajas; Daniel Ferrer	Nominated
2017	TVyNovelas Awards	Best Cast	Roberto Gómez Fernández	Nominated
2017	Latin ACE Awards	Best Soap	El hotel de los secretos	Won
2017	Latin ACE Awards	Best Actor	Erick Elías	Won
2017	Latin ACE Awards	Best Supporting Actress	Diana Bracho	Won
2017	Latin ACE Awards	Best Character Actress	Daniela Romo	Won
2017	Latin ACE Awards	Best Direction	Francisco Franco; Ana Lorena Pérez-Ríos	Won
