= Toda una vida =

Mexican telenovela

- Genre: Telenovela; Drama
- Directed by: Miguel Alemán Velasco; Carlos S. Zuñiga
- Starring: Ofelia Medina; Arturo Alegro; Jorge Arvizu; Miguel Ayones; Georgina Barragán; Rolando Barral
- Country of origin: Mexico
- Original language: Spanish
- No. of episodes: 23

Production
- Executive producer: Guillermo Diazayas
- Running time: 30 minutes
- Production company: Televisa

Original release
- Network: Canal de las Estrellas
- Release: 1981 – 1981

Toda una vida (English title:A Whole Life) is a Mexican telenovela produced by Guillermo Diazayas for Televisa in 1981. It is inspired by the real historical figure of María Conessa. It starred Ofelia Medina, Arturo Alegro, Dolores Beristáin, Georgina Barragán and Delia Casanova.

== Cast ==
- Ofelia Medina as Alejandra Pastora
- Arturo Alegro as Salvador Díaz Mirón
- Jorge Arvizu as Don Francisco I. Madero
- Miguel Ayones as Martín
- Georgina Barragán as Genara
- Rolando Barral as Rene Racquer
- Mary Begoña as Felisa
- Dolores Beristáin as Romualda
- Delia Casanova as Moravia Castro
- Manolo Coego as Don Julián Mauti
- Sergio Corona as Pedro de Montejo
- Eduardo Fajardo as Arnulfo
- María Fernanda as Imperio
- Luis García
- Alfonso Iturralde as Joaquín
- Evangelina Martínez as Magdalena
- José Luis Padilla as Don Porfirio Díaz
- Miguel Palmer as Sergio
- Armando Pascual as Antonio
- Luis Rábago as Ricardo
- Conrado San Martín as Roque
- Margarita Sanz as Soledad
- Miguel Suárez as Ramón
- Salvador Sánchez as Lucio
- Gonzalo Vega as Eduardo
- Ariadne Welter as Virginia Fábregas
