= Danilo Carrera =

Ecuadorian actor, model, and TV presenter

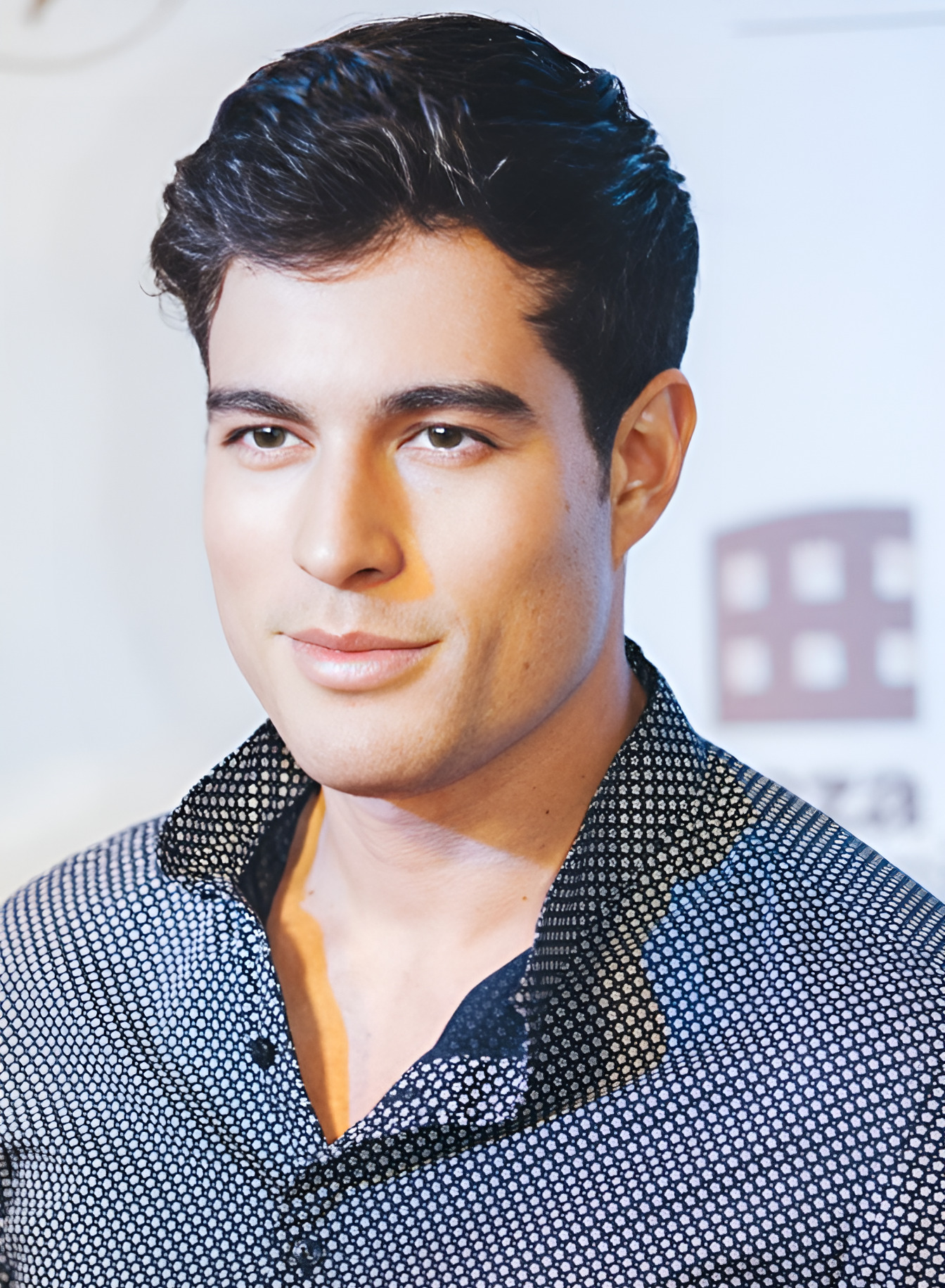
- Born: Danilo Xavier Carrera Huerta; January 17, 1989 (age 36); Guayaquil, Ecuador
- Occupation(s): Actor, presenter, model
- Years active: 2012–present

Danilo Xavier Carrera Huerta (born January 17, 1989) known as Danilo Carrera, is an Ecuadorian actor, presenter and model.

== Biography ==
Carrera was born in Guayaquil, Ecuador, to Xavier Carrera and Elsita Huerta. He is the oldest of five children, with siblings Leopoldo, Xavier, Felipe and Juan. Carrera studied in Balandra Cruz School of Southern Ecuador. He began his career in modeling in Ecuador, appearing in fashion shows, commercials for Toni, and also worked with De Prati and Abercrombie & Fitch. One of his greatest passions is football. In 2007 he was part of the Ecuadorian team Emelec sub-18, which were crowned champions. In 2008 Carrera joined the Ecuadorian team Barcelona Sporting Club in which he played until 2009. Apart from pursuing his career in acting, Carrera continues playing football in a local team in Miami.

== Filmography ==
| Year | Title | Role | Notes |
|---|---|---|---|
| 2012 | Relaciones peligrosas | Leonardo "Leo" Maximo | Recurring role |
| 2012 | Grachi | Axel Vélez | Recurring role; 55 episodes |
| 2014 | Cosita linda | Federico "Fede" Madariaga | Recurring role |
| 2015 | Pasión y poder | Franco Herrera Fuentes | Main role; 134 episodes |
| 2016 | Ruta 35 | Wilson | Recurring role |
| 2016 | Sin rastro de ti | Mauricio Santillana | Main role; 16 episodes |
| 2017 | La doble vida de Estela Carrillo | Danilo Cabrera Toribio | Main role |
| 2018 | Hijas de la luna | Sebastián Oropeza Ruiz | Main role |
| 2020 | Vencer el miedo | Omar Cifuentes Leal | Main role |
| 2020 | Quererlo todo | Mateo Santos Coronel | Main role |
| 2021 | Contigo sí | Álvaro Villalobos Hurtado | Main role |
| 2022 | Vencer la ausencia | Ángel Funes | Main role |
| 2023 | El amor invencible | Adrián Hernández/David Alejo | Main role |
| 2023–present | Hoy Día | Himself | Co-host |
| 2024 | Sed de venganza | Francisco Ramírez / Emilio Montenegro | Main role |
| 2025 | Velvet: El nuevo imperio | Carlos Aristizábal | Main role |
