= Cómo duele callar =

Mexican telenovela

- Genre: Telenovela
- Created by: René Muñoz
- Directed by: Miguel Córcega
- Starring: Alma Muriel; Enrique Rocha; Nuria Bages; Cynthia Klitbo; Edgardo Gazcón; Joaquín Cordero; Guillermo García Cantú
- Country of origin: Mexico
- Original language: Spanish

Production
- Executive producer: Eugenio Cobo
- Cinematography: Alejandro Frutos

Original release
- Network: Canal de las Estrellas
- Release: March 26 – October 23, 1987

Related
- Cicatrices del alma; El rincón de los prodigios

Cómo duele callar (English: How it Hurts to Keep Quiet), is a Mexican telenovela produced by Eugenio Cobo for Televisa in 1987.

Cynthia Klitbo, Graciela Mauri, Leonardo Daniel and Edgardo Gazcón as protagonists, while Joaquín Cordero and Guillermo García Cantú star as the antagonists.

== Plot ==
In a small town in Veracruz the story of three family groups bound by secrets, passions, hatred and resentment develops. The first of these consists of two sisters, unscrupulous Aurelia (Alma Muriel) and submissive Eugenia (Nuria Bages) who live alone on the farm of his own, both lay their eyes on the foreman of it, Villegas (Enrique Rocha), a man of passions that will become the source of conflict between the two sisters.

== Cast ==
- Alma Muriel as Aurelia
- Enrique Rocha as Villegas
- Nuria Bages as Eugenia
- Cynthia Klitbo as Cristina Cisneros
- Joaquín Cordero as Rosendo Cisneros
- Norma Lazareno as Mercedes de Cisneros
- Leonardo Daniel as José Luis
- Graciela Mauri as Rosario
- Edgardo Gazcón as Armando
- Ana Bertha Lepe as Jacinta
- Guillermo García Cantú as Mauro
- Mónica Miguel as Casimira
- Juan Felipe Preciado as Domingo
- René Muñoz as Rufino
- Ricardo de Loera as Pancho
- Genoveva Pérez as Justina
- Graciela Bernardos as Filomena
- Federico Romano as Quirino
- Miguel Rodarte as Félix
- Eugenio Cobo as Padre Antonio
- José Antonio Estrada as Sargento Moreno
- Guillermo Melo Guzmán as Detective
