= Mundo de fieras (Mexican TV series) =

- Genre: Telenovela; Romance; Drama
- Created by: Liliana Abud; Ligia Lezama; Marissa Garrido; Alberto Migré
- Written by: Mauricio Aridjis; Julián Aguilar
- Directed by: Alberto Díaz; Jorge Édgar Ramírez
- Starring: Edith Gonzalez; César Évora; Ernesto Laguardia; Gaby Espino; Helena Rojo; Azela Robinson; Laura Flores; René Casados; Sebastián Rulli; Sara Maldonado; Michelle Vieth
- Opening theme: "Antes de que te vayas" by Marco Antonio Solís
- Country of origin: Mexico
- Original language: Spanish
- No. of episodes: 120

Production
- Executive producer: Salvador Mejía Alejandre
- Producer: Bosco Primo de Rivera
- Production locations: Filming; Televisa San Ángel; Mexico City, Mexico; Locations
- Cinematography: Jesús Acuña Lee; Jesús Nájera
- Editors: Marco Antonio Rocha; Pablo Peralta; Alfredo Frutos
- Camera setup: Multi-camera
- Running time: 41–44 minutes
- Production company: Televisa

Original release
- Network: Canal de las Estrellas
- Release: July 31, 2006 – January 19, 2007

Related
- Mundo de fieras

Mundo de fieras (English: Love and Cruelty) is a Mexican telenovela produced by Salvador Mejía Alejandre for Televisa that premiered on July 31, 2006, and ended on January 19, 2007. It is a remake of the Venezuelan telenovela Mundo de fieras, produced in 1991. The telenovela stars César Évora, Gaby Espino, Edith González, Ernesto Laguardia, Helena Rojo and Michelle Vieth.

== Plot ==
Gabriel and Demián are identical twins but very different. Gabriel grew up in high society while his brother grew up in poverty which caused him to have a grudge against Gabriel and want to destroy him.

Gabriel was a widower who remarried the hysterical Joselyn. An accident makes Joselyn miscarry and causes disability to Luisito, her son with Gabriel. Joselyn blames her husband and makes his life miserable, with help from her mother Miriam and her daughter Karen from her first marriage. They are the "beasts" that destroy Gabriel.

One day a humble young woman named Mariángela comes to the mansion to teach Luisito, and Gabriel falls in love with her. The "beasts" take charge to destroy Mariángela, especially when they discover that she is the illegitimate daughter of Don Clemente, Miriam's husband and father of Joselyn.

== Cast ==
=== Main ===
- César Évora as Gabriel Cervantes-Bravo / Demián Martínez Guerra
- Edith González as Joselyn Rivas del Castillo Arizmendi de Farías / de Cervantes-Bravo
- Gaby Espino as María Ángela Cruz/María Ángela Rivas del Castillo Cruz
- Ernesto Laguardia as Leonardo Barrios Arizmendi
- Helena Rojo as Miriam Arizmendi Vda. de Rivas del Castillo
- Azela Robinson as Dolores Farías
- Laura Flores as Regina Farías de Martínez
- René Casados as Nicolás Navarro
- Sebastián Rulli as Juan Cristóbal Martínez Farias
- Sara Maldonado as Paulina Cervantes-Bravo Forlan
- Michelle Vieth as Karen Farias Rivas del Castillo

=== Supporting ===
- Margarita Isabel as Otilia Álvarez Vda. de Velásquez
- Claudio Báez as Don Federico Velásquez
- Javier Ruán as Padre Domingo
- Lupita Lara as Simona
- Juan Peláez as Clemente Rivas del Castillo
- Eric del Castillo as Don Germán
- Paty Díaz as Belén
- Odiseo Bichir as Tiberio Martínez Farías
- Alejandro Ruiz as Silvestre
- Sebastián as Luis "Luisito" Cervantes-Bravo Rivas del Castillo/Luis "Luisito" Cervantes-Bravo Velásquez
- Silvia Manríquez as Ingrid
- Elizabeth Aguilar as Chela
- Julio Vega as Mario
- Rodrigo Mejía as Rogelio Cervantes-Bravo Forlán
- Manuel Medina as Pedro
- Paola Treviño as Diana de Cervantes-Bravo
- Ricardo Vera as Dr. Fuentes
- Rocio Valente as Violeta
- Lidice Pousa as Elsa Barrios
- Alberto Salaberry as El Coyote
- Benjamín Rivero as Mastín
- Sheyla as Mayeya
- Reynaldo Rossano as Cortito
- Gustavo Sánchez Parra as El Chacal
- Carmen Salinas as Candelaria Gómez Vda. de Barrios

Special participation

- Dulce as Aurora Cruz
- Myrrha Saavedra as Soraya
- René Strickler as Edgar Farias
- Irán Castillo as Cecilia
- África Zavala as Aurora Cruz (young)

== Awards and nominations ==
Year	Award	Category	Nominee	Result
2007	25th TVyNovelas Awards	Best Telenovela of the Year	Mundo de fieras	Nominated
2007	25th TVyNovelas Awards	Best Antagonist Actress	Edith González	Won
2007	25th TVyNovelas Awards	Special Award for People's Favorite Star	Edith González	Won
2007	25th TVyNovelas Awards	Best Antagonist Actor	César Évora	Won
2007	25th TVyNovelas Awards	Best Leading Actress	Helena Rojo	Won
2007	25th TVyNovelas Awards	Best Supporting Actress	Laura Flores	Nominated
2007	25th TVyNovelas Awards	Best Direction	Jorge Édgar Ramírez	Nominated
2007	25th TVyNovelas Awards	Best Musical Theme	"Antes de que te vayas"	Nominated
2007	Bravo Awards	Best Telenovela	Salvador Mejía Alejandre	Won
2007	Bravo Awards	Best Antagonist Actor	César Évora	Won
2007	Bravo Awards	Best Leading Actress	Helena Rojo	Won
