= Al final del arco iris =

Mexican telenovela

- Genre: Telenovela
- Created by: María Zarattini; José Rendón
- Directed by: Alfredo Saldaña
- Starring: Olga Breeskin; Martín Cortés; Miguel Palmer
- Country of origin: Mexico
- Original language: Spanish
- No. of episodes: 180

Production
- Executive producer: Ernesto Alonso

Original release
- Network: Canal de las Estrellas
- Release: March 22 – November 26, 1982

Al final del arco iris (English: At the end of the rainbow) is a Mexican telenovela produced by Ernesto Alonso for Canal de las Estrellas in 1982. It starred Olga Breeskin, Martín Cortés, Magda Guzmán, Miguel Palmer and Úrsula Prats.

== Cast ==
- Olga Breeskin as Elsa Rivera
- Martín Cortés as Juan José
- Magda Guzmán† as Elvira Balmori
- Miguel Palmer† as Pablo
- Úrsula Prats as Alejandra
- Víctor Junco† as Federico
- Antonio Valencia as Esteban
- Angélica Chain as Myriam
- Ramón Pons as Mauricio
- Alba Nydia Díaz as Adriana
- Vicky de la Piedra as Guillermina
- Carmen del Valle as Estela
- Roberto Antúnez† as Asunción
- Susana Cabrera as Lucha
- Javier Ruán† as Leopoldo Rivera "El Pollo"
- Yolanda Liévana as Zuilma
- Ana Patricia Rojo as Caramelo
- Carlos Espejel as El Chicles
- José Chávez as Gregorio Pineda
- Carmen Cortés as Piedad
- Miguel Manzano† as Marcelo
- Eduardo Liñán as Luis Ernesto Samper
- Sergio Zuani as Filemón

== Awards ==
Year	Award	Category	Nominee	Result
1983	1st TVyNovelas Awards	Best Antagonist Actress	Magda Guzmán	Nominated
1983	1st TVyNovelas Awards	Best Antagonist Actor	Miguel Palmer	Won
1983	1st TVyNovelas Awards	Best Female Revelation	Olga Breeskin	Nominated
1983	1st TVyNovelas Awards	Best Male Revelation	Martín Cortés	Nominated
