= Pasión y poder =

Mexican telenovela

- Genre: Telenovela
- Created by: Carmen Ochoa; Alejandro Orive
- Screenplay by: Marissa Garrido
- Directed by: Pedro Damian y Juan Carlos Muñoz
- Starring: Diana Bracho; Enrique Rocha; Carlos Bracho; Claudia Islas
- Country of origin: Mexico
- Original language: Spanish
- No. of episodes: 80

Production
- Executive producer: Carlos Sotomayor
- Producer: Rafael Urióstegui
- Cinematography: Albino Corrales
- Camera setup: Multi-camera

Original release
- Network: Canal de las Estrellas
- Release: August 8 – November 25, 1988

Related
- Mundo de fieras (2006); Pasión y poder (2015)

Pasión y poder (English: Passion and Power), is a Mexican telenovela produced by Carlos Sotomayor for Televisa in 1988.

The series stars Diana Bracho, Enrique Rocha, Carlos Bracho and Claudia Islas.

== Plot ==
The story revolves around the family dramas and businesses of two rival families. The long-enduring rivalry started many years ago, when Arturo Montenegro and Eladio Gómez Luna fought over the beautiful Ana Laura Montesinos Casino. She ended up marrying Eladio. Years later, Ana Laura is an unhappy woman stuck in an abusive marriage, her only consolation her son Federico, who is a total antithesis of his father.

After being widowed by his first wife, Arturo married the shallow Nina Guerra with whom he had three kids: Rogelio, Ana Karen y Paulina. Arturo, who is always focused on his business doesn't realise that Pedro, his son from his first marriage is being treated cruelly by his stepmother and her children. His only allies at home are his sister Ana Karen and his sister-in-law Alicia Moncada. When Ana Karen falls madly in love with Federico Gómez-Luna, the son of her father's enemy, Pedro offers her his support.

Touched by her kindness towards him, Pedro falls in love with Alicia despite her being married to his brother Rogelio. Empowered by her love he gets the courage to stand up to his siblings. Arturo learns to love his son just as he is and decides to win back Ana Laura. However, Eladio will not let them be happy and will do anything in his power to destroy the Montenegros.

== Cast ==
- Diana Bracho as Ana Laura Gómez Luna
- Enrique Rocha as Eladio Gómez Luna
- Carlos Bracho as Arturo Montenegro
- Paulina Rubio as Paulina Montenegro
- Lola Merino as Ana Karen Montenegro
- Alejandro Landero as Federico Gómez Luna
- Patricia Rivera as Patricia
- Mariagna Prats as Alicia
- Constantino Costas as Rogelio Montenegro
- Miguel Pizarro as Pedro Montenegro
- Martín Barraza as Ariel Gómez Luna Durán
- Antonio Brillas as José Perea
- César Castro as Leonardo
- Delia Casanova as Soledad
- Yolanda Mérida as Rosario
- Claudia Islas as Nina Montenegro
- Ivette Proal as Marina
- Gustavo Navarro as Carlos
- Juan Carlos Muñoz as Jaime Guarnerius
- Pilar Escalante as Raquel
- Xavier Ximénez as Anselmo
- Patricia Lukin as Vanessa
- Emilio Guerrero as Teniente Morales
