= 19th TVyNovelas Awards =

2001 Mexican TV awards

- Date: May 8, 2001
- Location: Mexico D.F.
- Hosted by: Jacqueline Bracamontes, Alfredo Adame, Raúl de Molina, Adriana Riveramelo, Lorena Herrera, Toño de Valdés, Ernesto Laguardia & Montserrat Olivier

Highlights
- Most awards: Abrázame muy fuerte (9)
- Most nominations: Abrázame muy fuerte (17)

Television/radio coverage
- Network: Canal de las Estrellas

The 19th TVyNovelas Awards were an academy of special awards to the best soap operas and TV shows. The awards ceremony took place on May 8, 2001, in Mexico D.F. The ceremony was televised in Mexico by Canal de las Estrellas.

Jacqueline Bracamontes, Alfredo Adame, Raúl de Molina, Adriana Riveramelo, Lorena Herrera, Toño de Valdés, Ernesto Laguardia and Montserrat Olivier hosted the show. Abrázame muy fuerte won 9 awards, the most for the evening, including Best Telenovela. Other winners Primer amor, a mil por hora won 7 awards and Amigos x siempre, Locura de amor, Mi destino eres tú and Ramona won 1 each.

== Summary of awards and nominations ==
Telenovela	Nominations	Awards
Abrázame muy fuerte	17	9
Primer amor, a mil por hora	12	7
Mi destino eres tú	7	1
Amigos x siempre	5	1
Ramona	3	2
El precio de tu amor	3	0
Locura de amor	2	1
La casa en la playa	2	0
Carita de ángel	1	1

== Winners and nominees ==
=== Telenovelas ===
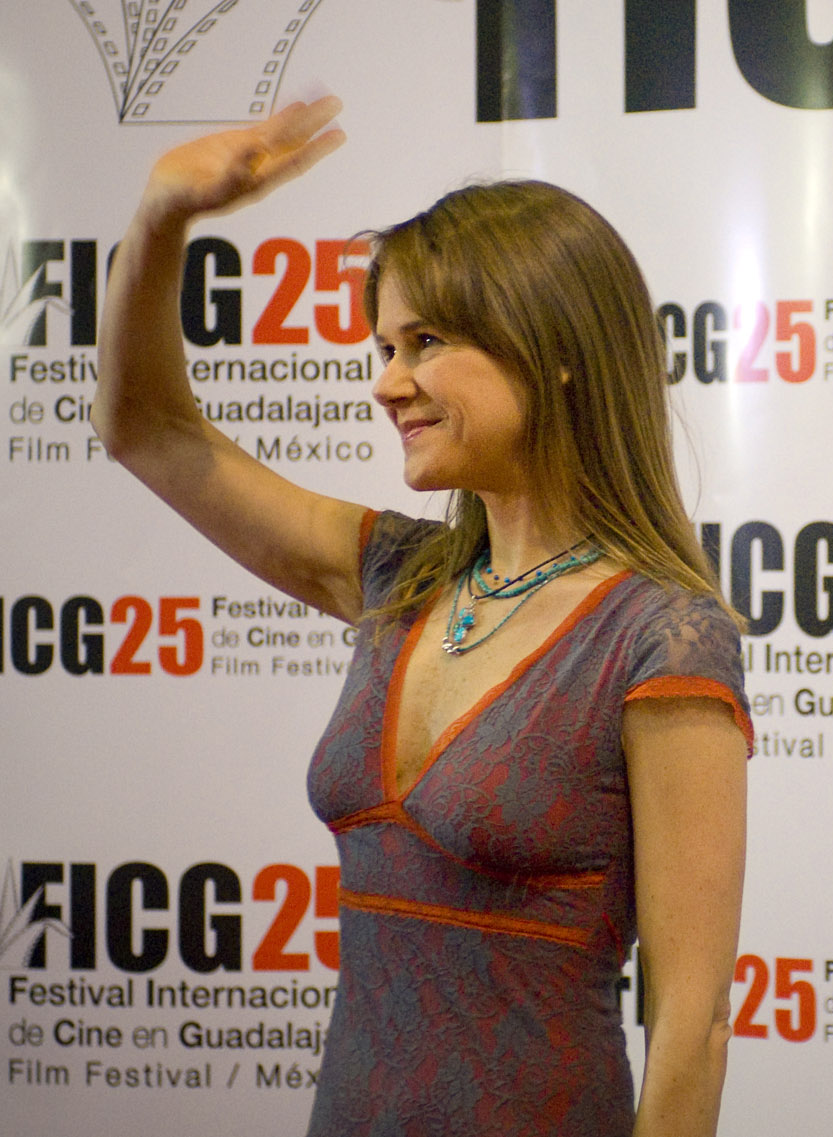
Nailea Norvind, winner for Best Antagonist Actress.

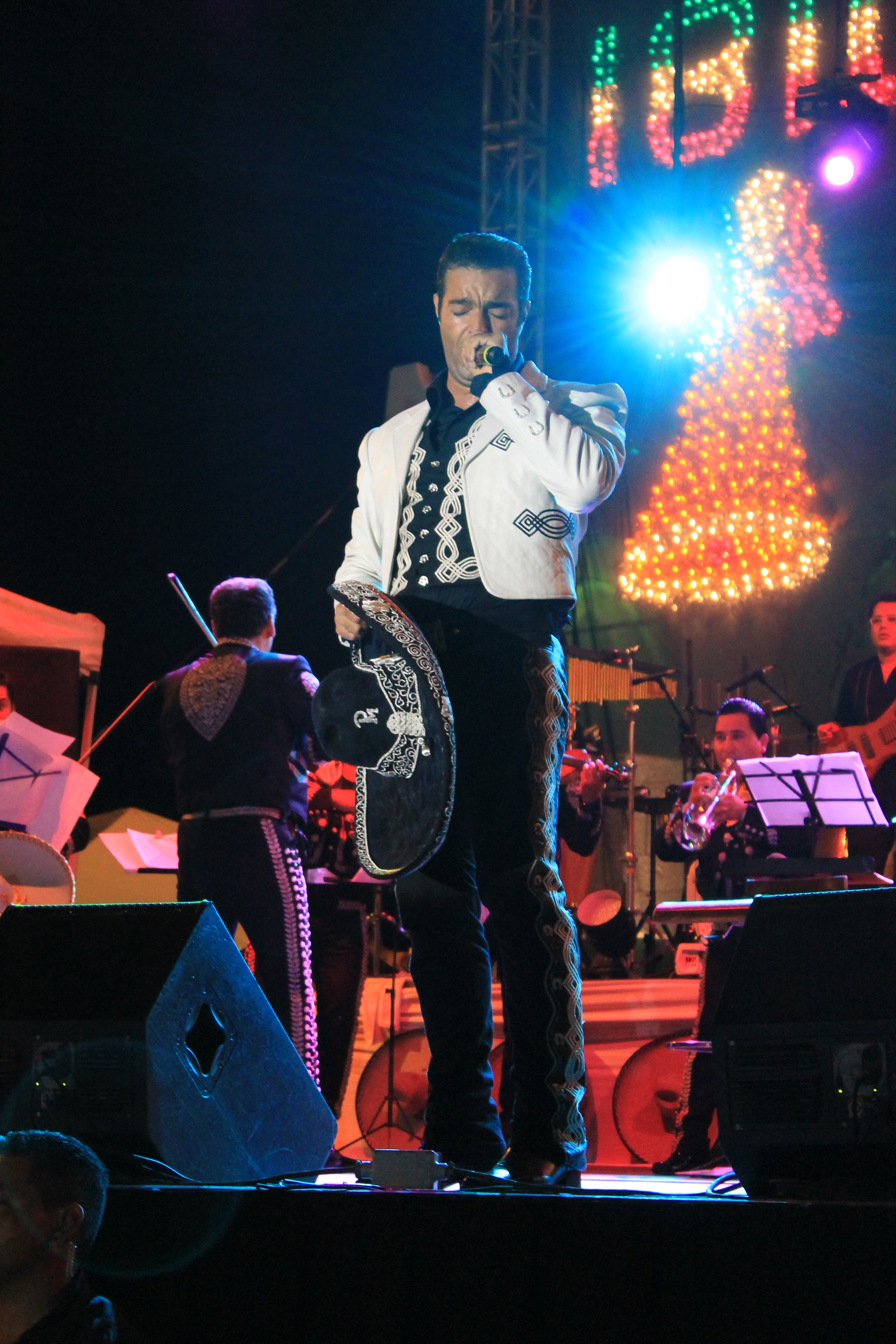
Pablo Montero, winner for Best Supporting Actor.

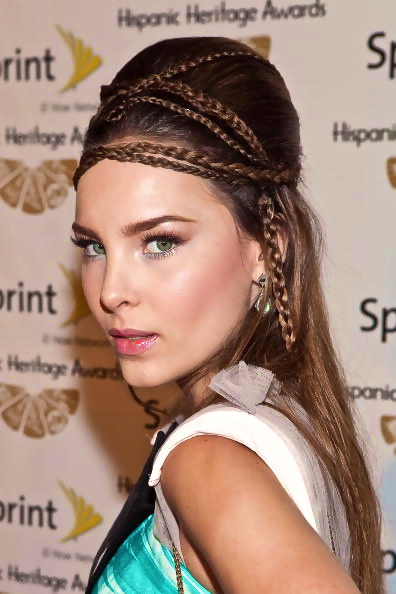
Belinda, winner for Best Child Performance.

Best Telenovela	Best Musical Theme
Abrázame muy fuerte; Locura de amor; Primer amor, a mil por hora	"Enloquéceme" — OV7 – Locura de amor; "Abrázame muy fuerte" — Juan Gabriel – Abrázame muy fuerte; "A mil por hora" — Lynda – Primer amor, a mil por hora
Best Actress	Best Actor
Lucero – Mi destino eres tú; Anahí – Primer amor, a mil por hora; Aracely Arámbula – Abrázame muy fuerte	Fernando Colunga – Abrázame muy fuerte; Ernesto Laguardia – Amigos x siempre; Jorge Salinas – Mi destino eres tú
Best Antagonist Actress	Best Antagonist Actor
Nailea Norvind – Abrázame muy fuerte; Susana Zabaleta – Mi destino eres tú; Yadhira Carrillo – El precio de tu amor	César Évora – Abrázame muy fuerte; Mauricio Islas – Primer amor, a mil por hora; Odiseo Bichir – Amigos x siempre
Best Leading Actress	Best Leading Actor
Helena Rojo – Abrázame muy fuerte and Ramona; Carmen Montejo – Amigos x siempre; Marga López – La casa en la playa	Joaquín Cordero – Abrázame muy fuerte and Carita de ángel; César Évora – Abrázame muy fuerte; Ignacio López Tarso – La casa en la playa
Best Supporting Actress	Best Supporting Actor
Arleth Terán – Primer amor, a mil por hora; Carmen Salinas – Abrázame muy fuerte; Yadhira Carrillo – El precio de tu amor	Pablo Montero – Abrázame muy fuerte; Fabián Robles – Primer amor, a mil por hora; Manuel Ojeda – El precio de tu amor
Best Female Revelation	Best Male Revelation
Ana Layevska – Primer amor, a mil por hora; Belinda – Amigos x siempre; Montserrat Olivier – Ramona	Valentino Lanús – Primer amor, a mil por hora; Jaime Camil – Mi destino eres tú; Pablo Montero – Abrázame muy fuerte

=== Others ===
Best Action Sequence	Best Fight
Kuno Becker and Mauricio Islas – Primer amor, a mil por hora; Fernando Colunga – Abrázame muy fuerte; Lucero – Mi destino eres tú	Kuno Becker and Mauricio Islas – Primer amor, a mil por hora; César Évora and Pablo Montero – Abrázame muy fuerte; Jorge Salinas and Jaime Camil – Mi destino eres tú
Best Kiss	Best Child Performance
Ana Layevska and Valentino Lanús – Primer amor, a mil por hora; Aracely Arámbula and Fernando Colunga – Abrázame muy fuerte; Lucero and Jorge Salinas – Mi destino eres tú	Belinda – Amigos x siempre
Best Direction	Best Direction of the Cameras
Miguel Córcega – Abrázame muy fuerte	Carlos Sánchez Ross and Vivian Sánchez Ross – Primer amor, a mil por hora
Best Original Story or Adaptation	Best Art Design and Decor
Liliana Abud – Abrázame muy fuerte	Ramona
Best Entertainment Show	Best Host
Otro rollo	Adal Ramones – Otro rollo
Best Reality Show	Best Melodramatic Show
Pedro Torres – Big Brother	Silvia Pinal – Mujer, casos de la vida real
Best Comedy Actress	Best Comedy Actor
Consuelo Duval – La hora pico	Eugenio Derbez – Derbez en cuando

=== Special awards ===
- Best Foreign Telenovela: Yo soy Betty, la fea
- Best Foreign Actress: Ana María Orozco for Yo soy Betty, la fea
- Best Foreign Actor: Jorge Enrique Abello for Yo soy Betty, la fea
- Best Sports Program: Televisa Deportes
- Best Sports Commentator: Toño de Valdés

=== Absent ===
People who did not attend the ceremony and were nominated in the shortlist in each category:

- Helena Rojo (Lucy Orozco received the award in her place)
