= Emmanuel Palomares =

Venezuelan television actor and model (born 1990)

- Born: July 13, 1990 (age 35); Valera, Trujillo, Venezuela
- Occupations: Actor, model
- Years active: 2010 – present

Emmanuel Palomares (born July 13, 1990, in Valera, Trujillo, Venezuela) is a Venezuelan television actor and model.

== Education and career ==
He began his career, aged 18, in the juvenile series Corazones extremos, broadcast by Venevisión.

He took acting classes in the Luz Columba school with Professor Nelsón Ortega.

In 2013, he was selected by Eugenio Cobo to enter Televisa's Centro de Educación Artística (CEA) in Mexico City, Mexico.

=== Filmography ===
Television performance
Year	Title	Roles	Notes
2012	Nacer contigo	Miguel Ángel	Series regular
2014–2015	Como dice el dicho	Juan Ignacio Gustavo Ángel	Episode: "Mira por donde vas" Episode: "Es tan difícil decir la verdad" Episode: "Mientras cuentas las estrellas"
2015	La rosa de Guadalupe	Antonio Salomón	Episode: "Una carta de amor" Episode: "Un mundo sin obstáculos"
2015	Escándalos	Mateo Bautista Brand	Episode: "La fraternidad"
2015	Pasión y poder	Johnny	Guest star
2016	Corazón que miente	Lisandro Moliner Bustos	Series regular; 62 episodes
2016	Mujeres de negro	José Rivera	Series regular; 42 episodes
2017	En tierras salvajes	Uriel Santana	Series regular; 70 episodes
2018	Y mañana será otro día	Rafael de la Maza	Series regular; 76 episodes
2020	Vencer el miedo	Rommel Guajardo	Main role; 47 episodes
2020–2021	Vencer el desamor	Gael Falcón Albarrán / Rommel Guajardo	Series regular; 93 episodes
2021	¿Quién es la máscara?	Hot Dog	Season 3
2022	La herencia	Simón del Monte	Main role
2023	Perdona nuestros pecados	Andrés Martínez	Main role
2024	Vivir de amor	José Emilio Aranda Rivero Cuéllar	Main role
2024	Las hijas de la señora García	Nicolás Portilla	Main role
2025	Los hilos del pasado	Carlos Navarro	Main role
2026	Tierra de amor y coraje	Juan	Main role

== See also ==
- List of Venezuelan actors
