= Cold Mountain =

Cold Mountain may refer to:

== Art, entertainment and media ==
- Cold Mountain (novel), a 1997 novel by Charles Frazier
  - Cold Mountain, fictional name for Bethel community of Canton, North Carolina
- Cold Mountain (film), a 2003 film adaptation of Charles Frazier's novel
  - Cold Mountain (soundtrack), the soundtrack to the film
- Cold Mountain (opera), a 2015 opera by Jennifer Higdon
- Cold Mountain Penitentiary, the prison featured in the novel The Green Mile and its film adaptation
- Cold Mountain, a series of paintings by American abstract artist Brice Marden
- Cold Mountain, a seasonal craft beer by Highland Brewing Company of Asheville, NC

== Places ==
- Cold Mountain (North Carolina), 1,840 m (6,030 ft), located within the Pisgah National Forest
- Cold Mountain (Slovenia) (Slovene: Mrzla gora), 2,203 m, located in the Kamnik Alps
- Cold Mountain (California), a mountain in Tuolumne County, within Yosemite National Park

== People ==
- Hanshan (poet), a Chinese poet whose name literally means "Cold Mountain"

== See also ==
- Mendonça (disambiguation), a Portuguese surname that means "cold mountain"
- Mendoza (disambiguation), a Spanish surname that means "cold mountain"
