= Eugenia Cauduro =

Mexican actress and model

- Born: Eugenia Cauduro Rodriguez; December 20, 1968 (age 57); Mexico City, Mexico
- Occupations: Actress; former model; dancer
- Years active: 1997-present
- Children: Luciana; Patricio
- Parent(s): Ernesto Cauduro Gemoets; Silvia Rodríguez Porras
- Relatives: Adriana Cauduro (Sister)

Eugenia Cauduro Rodríguez (Spanish pronunciation: [ewˈxenja kawˈðuɾo]; born December 20, 1968) is a Mexican actress and former model.

== Career ==
Ever since she was a small child, Cauduro studied classical ballet and jazz. Cauduro participated in ballet as a child and spent six years with the National Mexican Dance Company (in Spanish, Compañía Nacional de Danza de México) until she was 20 years old. She began modeling at the age of 15 and later studied acting in Televisa's Centro de Educación Artística. In 1988, she was chosen to represent Mexico in a calendar from Japan Air Lines.

In 1990, Cauduro represented Mexico in an international beauty pageant held in Panama and was second place as "La Mejor Modelo Latina" in a group of thirty participants from many countries. From 1992 to 1995, she represented the image of Televisa in a series of appearances that showcased many of Mexico's marvels. While being the image of Televisa, she studied acting with actor/director Sergio Jimenez and the actress Adriana Barrasa. From there, Cauduro continued studying with Patricia Reyes Espindola. After acting in plays, she made her small-screen debut in 1997 with the telenovela Alguna vez tendremos alas, in which she played Magdalena Arredón.

Cauduro studied industrial design in the National Autonomous University of Mexico (UNAM).

Since that time, Eugenia has become one of the most recognizable actresses in Mexico. Eugenia's recent work includes a telenovela, Quererlo Todo, which has been awaiting release in 2020.

== Personal life ==
Eugenia Cauduro is the daughter of Ernesto Cauduro Gemoets and Silvia Rodríguez Porras, and the sister of Adriana Cauduro. Her mother had been a ballerina and her maternal grandfather, Dagoberto Rodriguez, had been a well-known Mexican actor. Eugenia's uncle, Rafael Cauduro, is a painter who is recognized internationally.

She has two children, Patricio and Lucina.

== Filmography ==
| Year | Telenovela | Role | Notes |
|---|---|---|---|
| 1997 | Alguna vez tendremos alas | Magdalena Arredón Mejía | Main cast |
| 1998 | Una luz en el camino | Luisa Fernanda | Supporting role |
| 1999 | Nunca te olvidaré | Silvia Requena Ortiz | Main cast |
| 1999-2000 | DKDA: Sueños de juventud | Angela Rey de Arias/Kara Giacometti | Main role |
| 2000-01 | El precio de tu amor | Gabriela Galván | Main role |
| 2003 | Niña Amada Mia | Julia Moreno | Supporting role |
| 2003-04 | Alegrijes y rebujos | Mercedes Goyeneche de Dominguez #1 | Main cast |
| 2005-06 | El Amor no Tiene Precio | Araceli Montalbán | Main cast |
| 2007-08 | Tormenta en el Paraiso | Analy Mayú de Lazcano | Guest role |
| 2008-09 | Un Gancho al Corazon | Gabriela "Gabi/Gabiro" Palacios de Ulloa | Supporting role |
| 2010-11 | Teresa | Vanesa Coronel de Alcázar | Supporting role |
| 2011 | Como dice el dicho | Berta | 3 episodes |
| 2012 | Abismo de pasion | Dolores "Lolita" Martínez de Chinrios | Main cast |
| 2012-13 | Qué Bonito Amor | Gloria Reyes | Supporting role |
| 2013 | Gossip Girl Acapulco | Leonora Fuenmayor | Recurring role |
| 2014 | El color de la pasión | Magdalena Murillo | Main cast |
| 2016 | Un camino hacia el destino | Marissa Ruiz de Gomez | Supporting role |
| 2017 | Papá a toda madre | Aurora Silvetti de López-Garza | Guest role |
| 2018 | Hijas de la luna | Teresa Pérez | Supporting role |
| 2019-2020 | Médicos, línea de vida | Patricia Antúnez de Guerrero | Recurring role |
| 2020-2021 | Quererlo todo | Esmeralda Santos Coronel | Supporting role |
| 2022 | Amor dividido | Cielo Sanchez | Supporting role |
| 2023 | Pienso en ti | Loreta Ortiz | Supporting role |
| 2024 | Vivir de amor | Cristina Rivero Cuéllar | |
| 2025 | A.mar, donde el amor teje sus redes | Gertrudis | |
| 2026 | Hermanas, un amor compartido | Nadia Celorio de Beristáin | |
