= Vivir de amor =

- Genre: Telenovela
- Based on: Laços de Sangue by Pedro Lopes
- Developed by: Katia Rodríguez Estrada; Doménica Tarello
- Written by: Enna Márquez; Alberto Aridjis; Carolina Mejía Lartilleux
- Directed by: Fernando Nesme; Sandra Schiffner
- Starring: Kimberly Dos Ramos; Gala Montes; Emmanuel Palomares; Juan Diego Covarrubias; Josh Gutiérrez; Eugenia Cauduro; René Strickler; Bárbara Islas; Gabriela Spanic
- Theme music composer: Miguel Bosé; Juan Carlos Calderón
- Opening theme: "Te amaré" by Laura Pausini & Miguel Bosé
- Ending theme: "Gloria y Sergio" by Gala Montes
- Composer: Álvaro Trespalacios
- Country of origin: Mexico
- Original language: Spanish
- No. of seasons: 1
- No. of episodes: 130

Production
- Executive producer: Salvador Mejía
- Producer: Laura Mezta Cordero
- Editor: Mark Rouch
- Camera setup: Multi-camera
- Production company: TelevisaUnivision

Original release
- Network: Las Estrellas
- Release: 29 January – 26 July 2024

Vivir de amor (English title: Living for Love) is a Mexican telenovela produced by Salvador Mejía for TelevisaUnivision. It is based on the 2010 Portuguese telenovela Laços de Sangue, created by Pedro Lopes. The series stars Kimberly Dos Ramos and Emmanuel Palomares. It aired on Las Estrellas from 29 January 2024 to 26 July 2024.

== Plot ==
Twenty years ago, Elena's family falls apart when her daughter Frida is kidnapped and presumed dead, leaving her with just Angelli, her youngest daughter. Meanwhile, Alma and Antonio mourn the death of their daughter, but just after burying her, they find Frida and pass her off as their daughter Rebeca. Years later, Rebeca discovers her true origin and decides to take revenge when she learns that, while she grew up in great poverty, her sister Angelli has lived surrounded by luxury.

== Cast ==
=== Main ===
- Kimberly Dos Ramos as Angelli del Olmo Sandoval
- Gala Montes as Rebeca Sánchez Trejo / Frida del Olmo Sandoval
- Emmanuel Palomares as José Emilio Aranda Rivero Cuéllar
- Juan Diego Covarrubias as Luciano Garza Treviño
- Josh Gutiérrez as Misael Rivero Cuéllar
- Eugenia Cauduro as Cristina Rivero Cuéllar
- René Strickler as Adolfo Pastrana
- Bárbara Islas as Doris Mendoza
- Gabriela Spanic as Mónica Rivero Cuéllar
- Mariluz Bermúdez as Fátima Aranda Rivero Cuéllar
- Amairani as Elena Sandoval del Olmo
- Magda Karina as Alma Trejo
- Isadora González as Gildarda "Gi" Corcuera
- Isabel Madow as Wanda Carmín
- Mauricio Aspe as Armando Cienfuegos
- Malillany Marín as Jimena Díaz
- Adanely Núñez as Guadalupe Méndez Trejo
- Roberto Romano as Bruno Fonseca
- Mauricio García Muela as Iker Beltrán
- Krizia Preciado as Romina Castillo
- Marco León as Sebastián Briseño del Olmo
- Patricio José as Renato Esquivel
- Mirta Renée as Marisa García
- Fidel Zizumbo as Santiago del Olmo Sandoval
- Renata Chacón as Matilde Garza Castillo
- Alessio Valentini as Lucas Farías Méndez
- Mateo Camacho as Gabriel Álvarez
- Paola Hasany as Sandra Fernández
- Leo Casta as Brayan Maldonado
- Orlando Santana as Memo
- Emilio Palacios as Ramiro López
- Yael Fernández as Axel
- André Sebastián as Pedrito
- Regis as Loli García
- Emi Ducoing as Javier Garza Castillo
- Alessandro Islas as David
- Eric del Castillo as Emilio Rivero Cuéllar

=== Recurring and guest stars ===
- Christian de la Campa as Ulises del Olmo
- Josselyn Garciglia as Dulce Aranda Rivero Cuéllar
- Francisco Gattorno as Antonio Sánchez
- Enrique Montaño as Luis Farias
- Perla Corona as Agent Corral
- Manuel Riguezza as Carmelo Jiménez
- Marcelo Buquet as Mauricio
- Milia Nader as La Pinky
- Jackie Sauza as Julia

== Production ==
=== Development ===
On 31 August 2023, it was announced that Salvador Mejía had begun pre-production on his upcoming telenovela. Filming of the telenovela began on 6 November 2023 and concluded in April 2024.

=== Casting ===
On 9 October 2023, Gabriela Spanic, Amairani, Magda Karina, Eugenia Cauduro, Francisco Gattorno and Eric del Castillo were announced as part of the cast. On 11 October 2023, Emmanuel Palomares was confirmed in the lead role. On 17 October 2023, Kimberly Dos Ramos was announced to star opposite of Palomares, with Gala Montes and Josh Gutiérrez being cast as the antagonists of the story.

== Ratings ==
Season	Timeslot (CT)	Episodes	First aired		Last aired	
Season	Timeslot (CT)	Episodes	Date	Viewers (millions)	Date	Viewers (millions)
1	Mon–Fri 4:30 p.m.	130	29 January 2024	4.5	26 July 2024	2.6

== Episodes ==
No.	Title	Original release date
1	"Le robamos la vida a Rebeca"	29 January 2024 (Note: Premiered early online through Las Estrellas website on 26 January 2024.)
Frida gets careless and is kidnapped by a couple; Elena and Ulises desperately search for her. Alma and Antonio rescue Frida, but Alma thinks she is Rebeca, the daughter she recently lost. Years later, José Emilio tells Angelli that he wants to be with her for the rest of his life, so he proposes that she be his wife. Rebeca hears Alma and Antonio say that she is not their real daughter and confronts them.
2	"Yo soy Frida del Olmo"	30 January 2024
Alma tries to make Rebeca understand all the love she and Antonio have given her since she was a child, but Rebeca disowns them. Antonio shows Rebeca some clippings of the del Olmo family and assures her that he believes she is Frida. Rebeca visits the places where she was last with her parents and relives the day she was separated from her family. Rebeca arrives at the del Olmo house just as Angelli is leaving and an accident almost occurs.
3	"Le voy a quitar todo a Angelli"	31 January 2024
Monica intrigues against Angelli in front of the family again, but José Emilio puts a stop to it. Doris asks Rebeca to be careful with Angelli because she will not allow her to disrupt her life, but Rebeca is determined to do anything. Misael complains to José Emilio for not taking responsibility for the ranch, but Fátima offers to work there to prove who she is. Fátima's car breaks down and Luciano arrives to help her. Elena and Angelli visit Frida's grave, but Rebeca follows them and suffers when she sees that she is presumed dead.
4	"Yo voy a ser tu esposa, José Emilio"	1 February 2024
Angelli suffers when she sees her mother grieving for her sister and asks for the miracle of seeing Frida again. Don Emilio reacts, but when he sees José Emilio, he tells him what Misael did. Rebeca deliberately bumps into José Emilio to meet him; upon seeing him, she surprisingly kisses him. Rebeca is determined to get Angelli out of her way and orchestrates a plan to do so.
5	"Eres un ángel, Rebeca"	2 February 2024
Elena thanks Rebeca for saving her life and offers her a job at the restaurant. Misael orders Santiago to rob Don Emilio's house; on his way out of the restaurant, he runs into Rebeca. Fátima discovers that Luciano is married and complains to him for deceiving her. Santiago enters Don Emilio's house with Misael's help, but Misael betrays him in the end.
6	"La muerte de Dulce"	5 February 2024
Rebeca looks for Elena to reveal her identity, but Angelli interrupts them. The doctor informs Sebastián that Dulce has died; Cristina and José Emilio are shocked by the news. José Emilio says goodbye to Dulce, assuring Sebastián and Cristina that he will find the person responsible for her death. Cristina cries as she remembers the moments she spent with Dulce.
7	"Me gustas, Rebeca"	6 February 2024
Rebeca goes to Dulce's funeral to offer her condolences to José Emilio; Angelli is surprised to see that they know each other. Misael confesses to Rebeca that he likes her and asks her to invite him to her house; she teases him and they end up kissing. Rebeca asks Doris for help to destroy Santiago's life and thus end Angelli. Cristina is heartbroken over Dulce's death; Adolfo sees her and offers his affection.
8	"La suerte está del lado de Rebeca"	7 February 2024
Rebeca justifies herself to Elena for failing her at work and asks for another chance. Rebeca listens to Santiago when he confronts Misael for killing Dulce and will use the information to her advantage. Angelli goes to the casino to pay Santiago's gambling debt, but he makes her believe it is the first time it has happened. Mónica swears to Misael that she will not let Angelli take what belongs to them.
9	"Quiero que estemos juntos siempre, José Emilio"	8 February 2024
Rebeca plans to tell José Emilio that Angelli is hiding the man who killed his sister Dulce. Angelli and José Emilio go on a romantic walk where they promise to be together for a lifetime. Misael invites Rebeca to his apartment and they sleep together. By decision of Don Emilio, José Emilio is chosen to take charge of the company, despite the opposition of Mónica and Misael.
10	"Nos vamos a casar este fin de semana"	9 February 2024
José Emilio desperately searches for his grandfather in the city, Angelli finds him in the market. Fátima makes it clear to Bruno that she does not want to marry him; Bruno gets angry and Luciano listens. José Emilio proposes to Angelli to get married as soon as possible because his greatest wish is to always be by her side. Luciano is bitten by wolves after defending his children from the attack.
11	"Nada puede detener nuestro amor"	12 February 2024
Luciano thanks Fátima for what she did to protect his family against the wolves, but Maty rejects her for making her father forget her mother. Rebeca asks Misael to confide in her and he unburdens himself by revealing what happened to Dulce. Luciano tells Fátima that his relationship with Romina is over; she thinks their love can't be, but they end up kissing. Angelli sees Santiago's tattoo and confronts him about killing Dulce.
12	"Los declaro marido y mujer"	13 February 2024
Santiago blackmails Angelli and she tells José Emilio that the wedding must be called off. Despite knowing the truth, Angelli agrees to marry José Emilio. Renato consoles Angelli as he sees her sad on her wedding day, but José Emilio sees them and confronts them. After the wedding, José Emilio surprises Angelli with a romantic room covered with rose petals and they make love.
13	"Te perdí la confianza, Angelli"	14 February 2024
Angelli and José Emilio celebrate their honeymoon on the beach, where they toast to their feelings. José Emilio finds Rebeca's letter and questions Angelli if it is true that Santiago killed Dulce. José Emilio complains to Angelli for hiding from him what Santiago did and for being his accomplice, Angelli swears that she tried to tell him the truth and apologizes for what Santiago did.
14	"Te vas a pudrir en la cárcel, Santiago"	15 February 2024
José Emilio informs the police that it was Santiago who killed Dulce and demands justice. José Emilio chases Santiago to make him pay for what he did to Dulce; the police arrive and arrest him. Rebeca, to make Angelli suffer more, tries to murder her own mother.
15	"Quiero salvar nuestro matrimonio"	16 February 2024
Angelli tries to make José Emilio understand her innocence, but he assures her that their relationship is over. Don Emilio and Cristina try to open José Emilio's eyes, but he is determined to hate Angelli. Angelli learns that José Emilio has gone to live at the farm and fears losing him forever, so she decides to travel to the farm to bring him to his senses.
16	"Nuestra historia de amor terminó, Angelli"	19 February 2024
Misael confesses to Mónica all his crimes and she swears that she will help him not to be discovered. Angelli swears to José Emilio that she will stop looking for him until Santiago's innocence is cleared up. Luciano questions José Emilio and makes him see his mistake in rejecting Angelli. Angelli gets stranded on the road and, while trying to return in the rain, falls into the river.
17	"No puedo vivir sin ti, Angelli"	20 February 2024
José Emilio finds Angelli in the river and saves her life. José Emilio manages to get Angelli to respond; she is happy to see that he is by her side. Rebeca begs Misael to get Santiago out of jail immediately or Angelli will ruin the whole plan by testifying. Misael, with Bruno's help, sends a message to Santiago to keep quiet.
18	"¿No tienes corazón, Rebeca?"	21 February 2024
José Emilio suffers at the thought that because of him Angelli almost died and swears to love her forever. Luciano reveals to José Emilio that he is in love with his sister. Santiago survives the attack, but Misael needs to get him out of prison to stop him from talking. Rebeca swears to Alma and Antonio that they will pay for kidnapping her; Antonio faints and Rebeca enjoys his pain.
19	"Te quiero fuera de mi vida, Angelli"	22 February 2024
Mónica tells Rebeca that she will help her become José Emilio's wife in exchange for getting Angelli out of their lives. Rebeca tells José Emilio that Angelli helped Santiago escape. José Emilio blames Angelli for being Santiago's accomplice and asks her to stay away from him. Elena complains to Angelli for causing Santiago's arrest and disappearance.
20	"Me quedé huérfana, José Emilio"	23 February 2024
Alma prays for Rebeca's health, because she knows that she has been diagnosed with a mental disorder since she was a child. Antonio tells Alma that Rebeca has already found her family and dies. Lupita confronts Rebeca for causing Antonio's death, but Alma defends her. Fátima and Luciano carve their initials in a tree to cement their love.
21	"Quiero ser tu mujer, José Emilio"	26 February 2024
Angelli questions Rebeca about her friendship with José Emilio; Rebeca lies to her and Angelli remembers Renato's words. José Emilio tries to save the life of Azabache, his horse, but seeing his poor condition, he decides to put him out of his misery. Rebeca gets José Emilio drunk to seduce him and take him to bed; Angelli enters and is shocked to see them together. José Emilio wakes up after getting drunk and is shocked to see that he spent the night with Rebeca.
22	"Quiero el divorcio José Emilio"	27 February 2024
Rebeca tells José Emilio that they gave themselves to love and believes she is in love with him, but is shocked by his answer. Mónica learns that Misael embezzled 50 million dollars from the company. Rebeca justifies herself to Angelli for messing with José Emilio, but Angelli doesn't believe her and fires her from the restaurant. José Emilio tries to explain to Angelli what happened with Rebeca, but she rejects him and tells him that it is best to get a divorce.
23	"La nueva dueña soy yo"	28 February 2024
Angelli complains to José Emilio about the pain he has caused her and that he will soon receive the divorce documents. Rebeca swears to Misael that she had nothing to do with José Emilio and asks him to continue with his plan. Rebeca suggests to Mónica to buy the shares of Angelli's restaurant to get rid of her once and for all. Angelli is shocked to discover that Rebeca bought most of the shares of the restaurant.
24	"Le haré creer a José Emilio que él es el papá"	29 February 2024
Misael warns Romina that if she continues to get involved in matters unrelated to her, he will put her in jail. Don Emilio makes his grandson see that Santiago is innocent, José Emilio regrets not believing Angelli. Rebeca confirms that she is expecting a child and confesses to Doris that she will make José Emilio believe that he is the father. Mónica accepts in front of Angelli that she bought the restaurant, but in exchange for not firing her, she asks that she never goes near her family again.
25	"¿Quién es éste hombre?"	1 March 2024
Rebeca warns Brayan that if he tries to hurt her she will report him and makes it clear that she will not give him any money. Rebeca assures Angelli that there can't be two bosses in the restaurant, so she gives her the option of working in the kitchen as a dishwasher or to fire her. José Emilio assures Rebeca that he will not stop looking for Angelli, she advises him not to beg her anymore. Cristina accepts that Mauricio be reunited with his children, the first to see him is José Emilio.
26	"Esta fue tu idea, no lo vayas a arruinar"	4 March 2024
José Emilio refuses to let his father live at home again, but Cristiana reveals to him that Mauricio is very ill. Rebeca prevents Misael from kissing her, as she fears they will be discovered by the family; however, Mauricio witnesses their encounter. José Emilio arrives at the courthouse to find Renato embracing Angelli, he is filled with jealousy and demands that he stay away from his wife. Mónica and Rebeca join forces to hurt Cristina, but in reality Mónica wants Rebeca away from her plans.
27	"Perdóname, Angelli"	5 March 2024
José Emilio explains to Angelli what really happened with Rebeca and assures her that he is the love of her life. Mauricio confronts Mónica because he knows that she and Rebeca planned the attack against Cristina. Adolfo asks José Emilio to give Mauricio a chance, but he is firm with his refusal.
28	"¿Qué te hice para que me odies así?"	6 March 2024
Rebeca messes up the restaurant to force Angelli to do her job. Fátima decides to give her relationship with Luciano a break so that he can think about whether he wants to be with her or with the mother of his children. The notary informs that Don Emilio's signature is legitimate and now José Emilio will be president of the company. Alma confronts Rebeca for deceiving the Del Olmo's and demands her to tell them the truth or she will do it herself.
29	"Quiero volver a confiar en ti, José Emilio"	7 March 2024
Mauricio tells Cristina how much he misses her and how good it makes him feel to be by her side. Angelli is shocked to see the bouquet of flowers that José Emilio sent her; Rebeca is upset to with the gesture. José Emilio discovers that Gabriela was responsible for the fraud and notifies the authorities to arrest her. José Emilio gives Angelli the signed divorce complaint, but she agrees to get back together with him.
30	"Vamos a retomar nuestra luna de miel"	8 March 2024
José Emilio suggests Angelli to escape to the farm to be alone and surprises her with a romantic evening, they both decide to resume their honeymoon. Rebeca finds Angelli and José Emilio's divorce papers signed and is happy to see that he is available. Mauricio tells Mónica that he has proof of Misael's embezzlement and that if she doesn't give him money, he will send them both to jail.
31	"Estoy embarazada, José Emilio"	11 March 2024
Mónica sells her shares to Angelli, who takes the opportunity to put Rebeca in her place. Fatima regrets breaking up with Luciano and asks to get back together with him. Cristina surprises Rebeca with a piece of jewelry; Fátima is upset to see her mother's affection for Rebeca. Rebeca surprises all the Del Olmo's by revealing that she is expecting José Emilio's child; Angelli tells him that it would be best to break up for good.
32	"Mauricio no nos va a volver a molestar"	12 March 2024
Misael informs Mónica that the baby Rebeca is expecting is his; Mónica is upset, but Misael complains to her about the past. Mauricio demands the blackmail money from Rebeca, but she refuses to give it to him and takes the opportunity to run him over. José Emilio receives notice of the divorce that Angelli filed for and suffers when he learns that they are no longer husband and wife. José Emilio takes Rebeca to the hospital; she asks him to take care of her baby and to marry her if everything goes well.
33	"La vida de Rebeca corre peligro"	13 March 2024
Mónica suggests that Rebeca bribe the doctor to say that her health is in danger and thus secure José Emilio. Rebeca apologizes to José Emilio for everything that has happened, because she has loved him from the first moment she saw him. Cristina asks José Emilio to take responsibility and marry Rebeca, but he rejects the idea. The doctor performs an ultrasound on Rebeca so that she and José Emilio can listen to the baby's heartbeat.
34	"¡Frida es Rebeca!"	14 March 2024
Renato, seeing what Angelli is going through, offers to be her support in difficult times. Angelli questions Rebeca about her hatred towards her and Rebeca assures her that she will tear her to pieces because she destroyed her life. Later, Angelli discovers that Rebeca is not really Alma's daughter. Angelli visits the grave of the real Rebeca and upon seeing the date of her death, she discovers that Alma stole Frida and Rebeca is her sister.
35	"Frida está viva y nos ha engañado a todos"	15 March 2024
Angelli wants to question Alma to find out the truth, but, not finding out anything, she looks for clues from Rebeca's past. Angelli finds Alma's newspaper clippings and steals them; upon seeing them, she finds a ribbon from Frida's doll and accepts that Rebeca is her sister. Alma catches Rebeca in Misael's arms and, upon hearing that the baby is his, confronts her daughter. After being threatened by Alma, Rebeca is determined to get her out of her way.
36	"Ya sé que eres Frida, mi hermana"	18 March 2024
Rebeca initiates the plan to get Alma out of the way by adding a dangerous substance to her food. José Emilio and Rebeca get married in a civil wedding, but Angelli comes to tell José Emilio that his wife is an impostor. Rebeca complains to Angelli for having had a life full of luxury while she suffered in poverty. Elena judges Angelli for interrupting Rebeca's wedding and judging her without knowing everything she suffered as a child.
37	"Soy la hermana perdida de Angelli"	19 March 2024
Elena asks Angelli to stop thinking about herself because she believes that the most important thing is that Frida is back in their lives. Rebeca receives an anonymous letter unmasking her and, being cornered by José Emilio, she has no choice but to confess that she is Frida del Olmo. José Emilio complains to Rebeca for hiding her identity; she tries to blame Angelli for everything, but José Emilio doesn't believe her. Bruno flirts with Monica and she ends up kissing him passionately.
38	"Voy a anular el matrimonio"	20 March 2024
Alma tells Angelli how she found Rebeca and how she brought her back to life. José Emilio does not know what to do after discovering who Rebeca really is, but Cristina asks him to calm down because she knows Rebeca is a good person. José Emilio confronts Rebeca for faking her illness and assures her that he will end their marriage. José Emilio seeks out Angelli to apologize for having doubted her because Rebeca is an impostor.
39	"¿Cuáles son tus intenciones, Rebeca?"	21 March 2024
Angelli refuses to get back together with José Emilio because he is still married and is going to be a father. Elena tells Angelli that if she doesn't give Rebeca a chance, she will put Alma in prison. Angelli reluctantly agrees to attend the dinner Elena arranged for Rebeca. At the family dinner, Angelli demands that Rebeca tell everyone what she was looking for by approaching them without revealing her true identity.
40	"Todo se paga en esta vida"	22 March 2024
Fátima asks José Emilio to make sure that the baby Rebeca is expecting is his, since she heard Mónica and Misael talking about it. Mauricio returns to Cristina's side, but when Rebeca sees him, she is shocked. José Emilio asks Rebeca for a paternity test of the baby. Luciano asks Fátima to stop running away and let themselves be carried away by the love they feel. Rebeca, upon discovering that Alma is planning to reveal her secret, spikes her drink with a substance to shut her up for good.
41	"Si fuiste tú, lo vas a pagar"	25 March 2024
Angelli finds Alma in critical condition; José Emilio arrives and they decide to take her to the hospital. Rebeca arrives at the hospital showing concern for Alma; the doctor informs them that she was poisoned. Agent Corral sends for Rebeca to find out what happened to Alma because someone wanted to kill her. Lupita learns that Alma is fighting for her life and, in front of José Emilio and Angelli, confronts Rebeca for what she did to her aunt.
42	"El destino se empeña en que estemos juntos"	26 March 2024
Romina tries to seduce Luciano to revive their marriage, but he rejects her because he only sees her as the mother of his children. Rebeca pours poison into one of Alma's utensils so that the police suspect it was an accident and not an attempted murder. José Emilio looks for Angelli in Valle de Bravo to talk about their love, but she rejects him.
43	"No me importa morir si es por ti"	27 March 2024
José Emilio is determined to do anything to talk to Angelli, but she refuses to listen to him. José Emilio begins to get sick from being in the rain. Rebeca, seeing Angelli asleep in José Emilio's arms, pulls out a gun determined to kill her sister. Renato and Angelli enjoy the fair together; he saves her from slipping and takes the opportunity to kiss her in front of José Emilio and Rebeca.
44	"Yo a ti no te amo"	28 March 2024
José Emilio confronts Renato for kissing Angelli, but Rebeca takes advantage of the moment to complain to her sister for spending the night with her husband. Mónica informs Misael that the company's fraud has been exposed and he is in danger. Rebeca wants to clarify her situation with José Emilio and he makes it clear that he does not love her. Renato advises Angelli to forget about José Emilio and believes that the best option is to give him a chance at love.
45	"Nuestro matrimonio se acabó"	29 March 2024
José Emilio talks to Rebeca about the future of their relationship and tells her that he does not plan to stay by her side. Rebeca surprises her siblings when she arrives at their house and confesses that they will now live together, but Angelli is not convinced. José Emilio learns that Rebeca has left home and does not intend to fall into her game, so he calls her to demand a divorce. Rebeca can't help but feel hatred for Angelli and begins to destroy her sister's room.
46	"No mereces ser madre, Rebeca"	1 April 2024
Rebeca tells José Emilio that if he doesn't want to be by her side, it would be best to terminate her pregnancy. Angelli does not feel safe living in the same house with Rebeca and discovers the damage she did to her bedroom. Mauricio takes revenge on Rebeca by giving her a substance to end her pregnancy; Rebeca suffers when she learns that she lost the baby. Rebeca asks Misael to kill Mauricio for causing her to lose her baby.
47	"Rebeca sigue embarazada"	2 April 2024
Misael hits Mauricio for what he did to his baby, but Mónica stops him from hurting him. Rebeca suffers from losing her baby, but swears that José Emilio will never know the truth. Angelli agrees to stay by José Emilio's side as long as he is a free man. The doctor informs José Emilio that Rebeca put her life in danger, but that the baby is safe and sound.
48	"No vas a poder conmigo, Rebeca"	3 April 2024
Rebeca threatens José Emilio with killing herself if he insists on abandoning her and the baby; he eventually gives in. Angelli slaps José Emilio when she learns that he has already reconciled with Rebeca. Rebeca threatens Angelli with harm if she continues looking for José Emilio, but Angelli finally puts a stop to her. Elena gives Rebeca a credit card and Rebeca swears that this is the beginning of her revenge.
49	"No cabemos en un mismo lugar"	4 April 2024
Elena announces to the family that Rebeca will return to work at the restaurant, so Angelli decides to quit. Mauricio tells Cristina that Mónica and Misael made an attempt on his life and holds them responsible if anything happens to him. Alma wakes up from her coma. Angelli tells Renato about her resignation and confesses to feeling emotionally drained. Angelli gathers her things and leaves her home; Elena makes her see that Rebeca is the only victim.
50	"Quiero darme una oportunidad contigo"	5 April 2024
Rebeca asks Doris for help to find someone who can give them a baby to trick José Emilio. Angelli has a new house and Renato helps her paint it and fix it up. José Emilio asks Angelli for a chance, but she makes it clear that she wants nothing to do with him because now she has Renato by her side. Lupe informs Rebeca that Alma woke up and wants to see her; Alma fears for her life.
51	"Esta vez el final será diferente"	8 April 2024
Rebeca takes Santiago to play poker at a casino and he gambles again with large amounts of money. Angelli suffers for having broken up with José Emilio and thinks she may never forget him despite being with Renato. Rebeca believes that José Emilio is still with Angelli and looks for proof among his things, without imagining that she would find the papers that prove Misael's crime.
52	"Brindar por una larga vida"	9 April 2024
Rebeca spoils Renato's food in order to confront him and make it clear who is the owner of the restaurant. Rebeca complains to Angelli for upsetting her mother; Elena supports her by telling Angelli that she is the one who hurts her the most. Gi recognizes Mauricio at the restaurant and reveals, in front of Cristina, that he and Mónica had a relationship in the past. Mauricio apologizes to his children for abandoning them; they accept and embrace him, but ask for time.
53	"Venganza por despecho"	10 April 2024
Rebeca seeks out Brayan to ask him to keep an eye on Angelli to find out if she is sneaking around with José Emilio. José Emilio assures Renato that Angelli will never love him, but Angelli demands that he stay out of her life. Mónica confesses to Cristina that she always knew she was Adolfo's lover, but that she kept quiet and took him away from her to get revenge on her. Santiago suggests to Renato to propose marriage to Angelli so that she can get away from José Emilio and fall in love with him.
54	"El bebé de Rebeca no es tuyo"	11 April 2024
Luciano confesses to Fátima his jealousy at knowing she was with another man and kisses her. Misael surprises Mauricio and kills him in revenge for what he did to his baby. Alma confesses to José Emilio and Angelli that the baby Rebeca is expecting is not his; Brayan prevents her from revealing more of Rebeca's secrets. José Emilio wants to alert Angelli about Rebeca, but she blocks him from having contact with her.
55	"Al final, Rebeca se salió con la suya"	12 April 2024
José Emilio confronts Rebeca for making him believe that he is the father of her baby and assures her that he will give her a paternity test. Rebeca, knowing that José Emilio and Angelli are seeing each other secretly, promises to make Angelli regret everything she has done to her. Romina assures Luciano that if he does not go with her to Monterrey and try to recover his marriage, she will return to the city with everything and her children. Rebeca complains to Angelli for kissing José Emilio, but in the argument Rebeca rolls down the stairs.
56	"Lo que sigue es el divorcio"	15 April 2024
Rebeca accuses Angelli of pushing her down the stairs and fears 'losing' her baby. Angelli swears that Rebeca threw herself down the stairs. José Emilio learns that Rebeca lost the baby and asks the doctor to see the body, but is shocked to see that Rebeca ordered her baby to be cremated. Misael begs Rebeca to run away with him. José Emilio defends Angelli from Rebeca's accusations and assures her that the best thing to do is to separate.
57	"La culpa es una cruz muy pesada"	16 April 2024
Angelli suffers as Elena believes more in Rebeca and accuses her of being a murderer. A nurse informs José Emilio that several witnesses saw Angelli push Rebeca and are determined to testify to put her in jail. Angelli believes that Rebeca could accuse her of ending her baby's life. Rebeca learns that there are videos of her accident and believes that José Emilio is afraid that she will report Angelli.
58	"De ti depende que Angelli esté libre o presa"	17 April 2024
Adolfo tells Mónica that their marriage was a big mistake and she blames Cristina for her suffering. José Emilio has a dream where Angelli is locked up in jail begging for her freedom. Renato confronts José Emilio for the harm he has caused Angelli and orders him to stop Rebeca from hurting her. Rebeca tells José Emilio that if he insists on getting a divorce, she will denounce Angelli for pushing her down the stairs.
59	"Rebeca te contagió su locura"	18 April 2024
Fátima is so devastated by Mauricio's death that she almost causes an accident. Rebeca kisses José Emilio in front of everyone, but Fátima gets upset and puts a stop to her. Angelli tells Fátima that the only reason José Emilio is still by Rebeca's side is because of love. Rebeca sees José Emilio in Angelli's arms and decides to take revenge on him, accusing Cristina of Mauricio's death.
60	"Adiós para siempre"	19 April 2024
Cristina confesses to José Emilio and Fátima what Mauricio did years ago to end up in prison. Angelli thanks Renato for all his patience and love and promises him that she will do everything to make their relationship work.
61	"¡Soy inocente!"	22 April 2024
Sebastián informs José Emilio that there is no more money to pay the employees; José Emilio confronts Misael for not doing anything about it. The police arrive with a search warrant to check Cristina's house because she is suspected of Mauricio's death. Renato decides to reveal his past to Angelli and fears that she will reject him when she learns that he dated Rebeca. The police find the gun in Cristina's room and arrest her for Mauricio's death; Cristina swears she is innocent.
62	"Condenada al infierno"	23 April 2024
José Emilio swears to Cristina that he will get her out of jail even if he has to take the blame for Mauricio's death. Brayan asks his accomplices to convince Lucas to go see him in jail to set a trap and kill him once and for all. Rebeca, Misael and Monica celebrate that Cristina will pay for Mauricio's death; the police report that everything incriminates her. Adolfo confesses to Cristina that he could never love Mónica because the one he really loves is her.
63	"¿Te quieres casar conmigo?"	24 April 2024
José Emilio tries to convince Angelli to be happy together, but she asks him to focus on his marriage and let her go. Elena complains to Angelli for wanting to destroy Rebeca and assures her that she does not know her as a daughter. Adolfo, tired of Mónica's attacks, assures her that he will divorce her, but she makes it clear that he will not see a penny of her money. Renato serenades Angelli and surprises her with an engagement ring; José Emilio is shocked to see them.
64	"Hablar de hombre a hombre"	25 April 2024
Angelli asks Renato for forgiveness because she cannot marry him without love, but promises to do everything to make it happen. Mónica visits Cristina in jail to tease her and assure her that she will stay with the man she loves. José Emilio looks for Renato to tell him what Angelli means to him because she is the woman he loves most in life. Fátima finds Misael coming out of Rebeca's room and confronts them.
65	"Acepto casarme contigo"	26 April 2024
Rebeca demands Angelli to stay away from José Emilio for good or she will pay for it. Adolfo notifies Cristina that her raincoat and the gun were used by the murderer to take Mauricio's life and for this she could spend a long prison sentence. Rebeca proposes José Emilio a deal to be in peace; she kisses him and he is carried away by passion. Angelli receives a video of Rebeca kissing José Emilio and decides to accept Renato's marriage proposal. Cristina remembers the day Mauricio accused Mónica and Misael of attempted murder; she tells Adolfo and they both vow to find the culprit.
66	"¡Bienvenida a prisión!"	29 April 2024
While Cristina is transferred to prison, Mónica is afraid of being discovered and asks Misael to find another culprit for Mauricio's death. Angelli finds Santiago in the casino; she confronts him for so many lies and asks him to go to a specialist. Brayan takes advantage of Lucas visiting him in prison to take revenge for betraying him.
67	"En la vida siempre hay una solución"	30 April 2024
José Emilio asks Renato to take good care of Angelli because she is a great woman. One of the guards, with the help of a prisoner, steals Cristina's shoes and now she will have to walk barefoot in prison. Mónica asks Misael to teach Cristina a lesson in prison so that Adolfo can be in love with a marked woman. José Emilio discovers that Pedrito is living on the street and proposes to adopt him to protect him.
68	"Voy a hacer de tu vida un infierno"	1 May 2024
Pedrito thanks José Emilio for his intention to adopt him, but he wants to stay in the neighborhood because his mother might come back for him. Rebeca demands Angelli tell José Emilio that she is marrying Renato for love and congratulates her on her upcoming wedding. Wanda picks up a rattle that Pedrito dropped and is shocked to see that it is the same one her baby boy had the day Mónica took him from her. José Emilio demands that Rebeca leave him alone, but she complains to him for continuing to see Angelli on the sly.
69	"La nueva accionista Rivero Cuéllar"	2 May 2024
Rebeca gets Petra to take Mauricio's watch so that she can be framed for his death. Renato is anxious to join his life to Angelli's and questions her about the date she wants to get married. Rebeca signs Cristina's power of attorney to take ownership of her shares in the family business. La Escorpiona, with the help of the warden, look for the best moment to confront Cristina and send her a message from Mónica.
70	"Rebeca nos va a hacer un daño terrible"	3 May 2024
Yadhira comes to Cristina's rescue and confronts La Escorpiona to prevent her from hurting her. Angelli tells Gi that she senses that Rebeca has more harm to do. Doris finds a letter and a box of chocolates, but throws them away believing they are from Iker, not imagining that Sebastián left them for her. Angelli is shocked to find her house destroyed by Rebeca's orders, who sent her a welcome to the neighborhood.
71	"Te vas a hundir tú sola"	6 May 2024
Don Emilio complains to Rebeca for taking advantage of Cristina's pain to take her shares. Rebeca takes over her position as partner of the company and warns everyone that anyone who doesn't work will be fired. Mónica slaps Rebeca for taking Cristina's shares, but Rebeca is determined to strike back. Angelli suffers from not being able to get a supplier to distribute her products, not imagining that José Emilio will help her.
72	"Enferma de odio y envidia"	7 May 2024
José Emilio calls Renato to provide him the information of the supplier who can help Angelli, but Renato refuses his help. Alma gives her will to Angelli and asks her to watch out for Rebeca because she was the one who tried to kill her. Luciano discovers that Romina stole his money and orders her to leave the house immediately. Mónica decides to kill Cristina with her own hands for ruining her marriage to Adolfo.
73	"Pagar por los pecados"	8 May 2024
José Emilio prevents Mónica from hurting Cristina, but Mónica assures him that his mother is not as good as she seems. Alma seeks out agent Corral to tell her that she deserves to be locked up in jail for stealing Frida del Olmo. Cristina reveals to Don Emilio that José Emilio is not Mauricio's son, but Adolfo's son. Mónica and Bruno kiss passionately, but Adolfo catches them and forces Mónica to sign the divorce.
74	"Le voy a quitar la presidencia"	9 May 2024
Angelli tries to approach Elena, but her mother rejects her and does not want to talk to her. Misael complains to Rebeca for hiring Romina, but she tells him that she needs her to carry out her plan to take down José Emilio. José Emilio discovers that Angelli has not called the supplier who could help her and fears that Renato has not given her his contact. Sebastián declares his love to Doris and gives her a kiss, but she surprises him with a passionate one. Renato asks Angelli to marry him in a month.
75	"Poco te va a durar esa felicidad"	10 May 2024
Cristina reveals to Adolfo that when they separated she was pregnant and he is José Emilio's real father. Agent Corral shows José Emilio that a red-haired woman ran over Mauricio; he does not hesitate to think it was Rebeca. Rebeca gets tired of Angelli trying to take José Emilio away from her and assaults her, but Angelli fights back. Renato informs Elena of his marriage to Angelli and takes the opportunity to tell her who Rebeca really is.
76	"Lo mejor es cortar los lazos que nos unen"	13 May 2024
Elena, advised by Rebeca, asks Angelli to sell her part of the restaurant to her because she is becoming more and more disappointed in her. José Emilio interrogates the woman who witnessed the attack against Mauricio; she confirms that Rebeca ran him over. Misael questions Rebeca about her obsession with José Emilio and she accepts that she loves him as she has never loved anyone before. Cristina reveals to Elena all the evil Rebeca has done to the Rivero Cuellar family. Angelli refuses to sell her shares in the restaurant to Elena and instead decides to give them to her for free.
77	"Por fin vas a pagar el daño que has hecho"	14 May 2024
Agent Corral arrests Rebeca for the attempted murder of Mauricio; José Emilio announces to the family that there is a witness who saw her the night of the crime. Rebeca swears she is innocent, but José Emilio disowns her and assures her that she will pay for what she did to his father. Later, Rebeca is moved to see José Emilio visit her in the police station, but he swears that she will never see him again. Angelli and Renato agree to get married over the weekend.
78	"Se va a desatar un infierno"	15 May 2024
Rebeca assures that the Rivero Cuellar family paid the redhead to testify against her, but Agent Corral questions her about how she knew about the color of the witness' hair. José Emilio asks Sebastián to return to the company because Rebeca will serve a long sentence. Rebeca warns Misael that if he doesn't get her out of jail, she will send a recording where he confesses to having killed Mauricio. On Rebeca's orders, Brayan's accomplices burn down the cooperative; Angelli notices, but cannot escape the fire. Rebeca swears to Elena that she is innocent, but her mother assures her that justice will take care of her.
79	"Bienvenida al reclusorio de mujeres"	16 May 2024
Angelli wakes up in the hospital and thanks Renato for saving her from the fire, but he does not tell her that it was actually José Emilio who saved her. Rebeca is transferred to prison, where she runs into La Escorpiona, who shows her who is in charge. Adolfo informs Rebeca that José Emilio will divorce her, but Rebeca makes it clear that if he insists on the plan, she and Angelli will be in jail together. Angelli assures Jimena that even if José Emilio divorces Rebeca, she will never get back together with him.
80	"¡Adolfo es tu verdadero padre!"	17 May 2024
The investigator informs Angelli that some lighters and traces of a liquid were found in the cooperative, confirming that someone started the fire. With Cristina's help, José Emilio obtains a video that proves that Rebeca threw herself down the stairs on purpose. José Emilio notifies Rebeca of the divorce proceedings and reveals that there is a video that proves that she threw herself down the stairs. Cristina reveals to José Emilio that Adolfo is his real father. Rebeca pays Yadhira to protect her in jail and asks her to teach La Escorpiona a lesson.
81	"Que Rebeca sea liberada de inmediato"	20 May 2024
Mónica goes crazy when she learns that José Emilio is Adolfo's son and tries to attack Cristina. Yadhira betrays Rebeca out of loyalty to Cristina and delivers her into the clutches of La Escorpiona, who beats her up. The witness changes her statement and denies that Rebeca ran over Mauricio; the judge orders Rebeca to be released. Rebeca insults Doris for believing more in Angelli, but Doris is not willing to remain her friend and ends their friendship.
82	"Deja de hacerte el héroe con Angelli"	21 May 2024
José Emilio swears to Rebeca that she will pay for her crimes and he, Cristina and Don Emilio demand that she never return to their house again. Elena confronts Rebeca for having lied to her and confesses the disappointment she feels when she learned who she really is. Angelli hugs José Emilio for helping her unmask Rebeca, but Renato sees them. Rebeca asks Romina for help to get money to strip José Emilio of his shares. Renato confronts José Emilio for wanting to get Angelli back, but Don Emilio puts a stop to him for disturbing the peace in his house.
83	"Quiero que seas mi esposa"	22 May 2024
Adolfo tries to talk to Misael about his relationship with Cristina, but his son rejects him for always preferring José Emilio. Rebeca fires Angelli from the restaurant, but Santiago defends her and warns Rebeca that he will not allow her to assault his sister. Rebeca puts a substance in Elena's tea to control her and keep her on her side. Misael takes advantage of the fact that Rebeca is now a free woman to show her an engagement ring and beg her to be his wife. Adolfo tries to talk to José Emilio, but he tells him that he will always see him as a father and they embrace.
84	"¡Detengan esta guerra!"	23 May 2024
Rebeca tells Misael that it is not the right time to get married. Elena apologizes to Angelli for mistrusting her and asks her to get closer to Rebeca. Brayan is released from prison ready to take revenge against those who betrayed him. Pedrito does not want to see Wanda because he does not forgive her for touching his things; Alma scolds him for treating people badly. Romina manages to get into the company's account and notifies Rebeca, who orders her to transfer everything to her account.
85	"Rompo mi compromiso contigo"	24 May 2024
Rebeca tells Elena that it was Santiago who stole the money and that there is a witness that can confirm it. José Emilio finds Rebeca in Misael's arms and he tells her that they are dating; José Emilio complains to him for trusting someone like her. José Emilio makes it clear to Rebeca that he will not allow her to take his shares from him. Although Fátima reveals José Emilio's sacrifice, Renato is not willing to let Angelli out of his life. While José Emilio suffers for not being able to be near Angelli, she throws away the rings he gave her and is determined to let him go forever.
86	"Nos va a dar el zarpazo"	27 May 2024
Adolfo asks Misael to stay away from Rebeca because, when he least realizes it, she will betray him and leave him with nothing. Rebeca calls on the partners of the company to remove José Emilio from the presidency because his management has been dangerous. Rebeca manages to get the notary to agree that José Emilio be removed from the presidency and claims that she is the best qualified person to replace him as president, but Mónica teases her by saying that she only has experience selling tomatoes and onions. Don Emilio remembers everything and blames Misael for having committed fraud against the company.
87	"Vengo a impedir la boda"	28 May 2024
Don Emilio assures Rebeca that, as long as he lives, she will never run his company. José Emilio tells Rebeca that he will get back what belongs to him and Cristina shows her support for her son. José Emilio cannot stand the idea of Angelli joining her life to Renato's. Misael disowns Adolfo for preferring José Emilio. José Emilio surprises Angelli at her wedding and begs her not to marry Renato.
88	"La respuesta de Angelli es no"	29 May 2024
José Emilio challenges Angelli to marry Renato if she really loves him and seeing her hesitant, he begs her to run away. Mónica implores Misael to forget about Rebeca as he needs to regain credibility with his grandfather, Misael criticizes her for only caring about the company and not him. During the wedding, the priest asks Angelli if she accepts to marry Renato, she remains silent and Renato takes advantage of her silence to say no.
89	"Lo siento mucho Angelli"	30 May 2024
Renato confesses to Angelli that José Emilio sacrificed his love in exchange for her not going to jail. Renato announces that his wedding to Angelli has been cancelled, Rebeca calls him unmanly but he assures her that he doesn't care what she thinks. Misael can't get over Rebeca's betrayal and gets rid of her clothes, but not before warning that her time has come. Angelli arrives at Sebastián's apartment looking for José Emilio, who reveals that he left with the missionaries. Romina informs Rebeca that her contract was stopped because Don Emilio did not authorize the salary she promised her.
90	"Rebeca nunca se acostó con José Emilio"	31 May 2024
Julia congratulates José Emilio for saving the wounded man. Misael announces to Don Emilio that he is determined to defend his family from Rebeca's attacks and to make him trust him, he gives up his shares in the company. Mónica takes advantage of the situation Romina is going through and convinces her to be her ally in bringing Rebeca down. Rebeca arrives at Angelli's house to make fun of the fact that José Emilio is going to seek comfort in another woman, Doris defends Angelli and reveals that Rebeca never slept with José Emilio. Maty and her brother organize a romantic evening for Luciano so that he will declare his love again to Fátima.
91	"Me gustas muchísimo"	3 June 2024
Doris reveals to Angelli that the son Rebeca lost was Misael's, but she lied to remain with José Emilio. Don Emilio informs all the shareholders that Misael will remain in the company, Rebeca refuses, but he assures her that as a majority shareholder he has the right to make decisions. Julia confesses to José Emilio that she likes him very much and is sure that he could be the man who makes her trust in love again. Rebeca assures Misael that she can denounce him since she witnessed Dulce's death. Rebeca receives a call from her lawyer to inform her that because she cheated on José Emilio, she will not receive any financial benefit from her divorce.
92	"No le hagan daño a Rebeca"	4 June 2024
Elena asks Rebeca to do everything she can to get along with Santiago and Angelli, otherwise, it will not be convenient for her to stay at the restaurant. José Emilio, feeling unwell because of his fever, confuses Julia with Angelli, but she does not contradict him and asks him to fight for his life. Wanda takes Loly and Pedrito to visit Don Emilio, but when they arrive, they meet Mónica who does not hesitate to treat them with disdain. Angelli arrives at the cabin where José Emilio is staying and finds him kissing Julia. Luciano lends his card to Maty to buy a video game online, but it is all a set-up by Brayan.
93	"No me casé con Renato"	5 June 2024
Julia, upon learning that Angelli has arrived to be with Emilio, asks her to help her save him. Don Emilio shares with Cristina and Mónica that he has a special connection with Pedrito since he sees him as if he were his great-grandson. José Emilio manages to feel better and discovers that Angelli is by his side, she reveals to him that she did not marry Renato and is willing to win back his love. Gigi shows Doris the result of the DNA test where she confirms that Armando is her father, but Doris rejects him. Mónica meets with Rufino and demands him to confirm if Pedrito is the same child his grandmother raised.
94	"¿Dónde está mi hijo?"	6 June 2024
José Emilio begins to convulse with a fever. Misael complains to Wanda for leaving and not letting his son grow up by his side, she reveals that Mónica took him from her when he was a newborn. Mónica confirms that Pedrito is her grandson and is determined to get him back before Misael finds out, but plans to get Wanda out of her way. Misael demands that Mónica reveal his son's whereabouts; Wanda implores for a miracle to find her son. The Monarch of the community links the souls of José Emilio and Angelli through a ritual where the two once again vow eternal love.
95	"Angelli y yo nos reconciliamos"	7 June 2024
Mónica begins to feel ill and is rushed to the hospital. Misael reveals to his father that he had a son, but does not know of his whereabouts since his mother took it upon herself to keep him out of his life. Romina manages to win custody of Maty and Xavi from Luciano. José Emilio and Angelli arrive in town to communicate with their families and announce their reconciliation.
96	"¡Esas deben ser las pruebas!"	10 June 2024
Rebeca asks Doris to investigate José Emilio's whereabouts, she opposes and Rebeca threatens her. Elena confronts Santiago for lying to her and discovering that he returned to gambling, he denies all accusations and assures her that Rebeca is the only one to blame since she has manipulated her. Romina obtains important information about Mónica and gives it to Rebeca, who will take advantage of the fact that there are no family members in the house to put her new plan into action. Rebeca arrives at the Rivero Cuellar house ready to find the evidence that could link Misael to Dulce's death.
97	"Merezco llevar mi verdadero nombre"	11 June 2024
Pedro asks for a miracle so that Wanda can soon be with her son and he can be reunited with his mother. Angelli and José Emilio discover that Julia was stung by a scorpion and they must find the antidote to save her. Rebeca argues with Santiago and threatens to destroy him, Elena listens to her and assures her that she will stop the process to recognize her as her daughter Frida. Rebeca gives Elena some drops that make her hallucinate, she leaves the house and is run over. Angelli senses that her mother is in danger.
98	"¿Por qué me traicionaste?"	12 June 2024
Mónica shows Misael an image of his son Pedro and assures him that he lives in the same neighborhood as Wanda. When Sebastián learns that Doris only used him to get information about José Emilio, he kicks her out of his house and warns her that he wants nothing to do with her. Misael arrives at the neighborhood where Pedrito lives and confirms what Mónica said, Wanda always knew about his son's whereabouts and only lied to him to get closer to him. Misael complains to Rebeca for betraying him, she asks him for a chance, but he is determined to get her out of his way.
99	"Su amor ya engendró su primer fruto"	13 June 2024
After saying goodbye to Angelli and José Emilio, the Monarch of the community announces that Angelli is pregnant. Elena confesses to Gigi that she is sorry for hurting Angelli and fears she will never see her again, Angelli surprises her at the hospital. Elena tells Angelli that Rebeca spiked her drink with a substance that made her lose her mind. Cristina arrives at Mónica's room and finds her kissing Adolfo, she leaves so as not to interrupt them, but Adolfo tries to give her an explanation. José Emilio sees Renato again and thanks him for not marrying Angelli, Renato assures him that Angelli would never have been happy by his side.
100	"No eres digna de llevar nuestro apellido"	14 June 2024
Misael warns Rebeca that he will not fall into her traps and that she only serves to satisfy his pleasures. Rebeca visits her mother in the hospital, but when she enters her room she finds out that Angelli and José Emilio are together. Alma and Doris arrive at the hospital ready to reveal all the misdeeds that Rebeca has committed against her family, Angelli is sure that her sister does not deserve to carry her last name.
101	"Esto se acabó para siempre"	17 June 2024
Doris does not allow Rebeca to insult Alma and slaps her. Mónica convinces Bruno to approach Pedrito and obtain a sample for analysis to confirm that the boy is Misael's son. Mónica humiliates Rebeca with her comments, but Rebeca warns her that if she continues to meddle in her personal affairs she will pay for it with Misael's life. Alma challenges Rebeca by assuring her that she is no longer afraid of her, but regrets that no one in her family wants to be by her side, Rebeca warns her that it will be the last day she sees her. Angelli begs her mother to denounce Rebeca because she can't let her continue hurting more people.
102	"Esa mujer atentó contra mi persona"	18 June 2024
Mónica decides to see the contents of Romina's safe and discovers that Bruno is cheating on her. José Emilio warns Rebeca not to try to hurt Angelli, she assures him that she is not afraid of him and plans to seek Elena's forgiveness. Doris contacts Rebeca to inform her that Alma was found passed out and that thanks to the fact that she was taken to the hospital, her life was saved. José Emilio prevents Rebeca from hitting Angelli and they request a restraining order to keep Rebeca away from the Del Olmo family.
103	"Yo no nací mala"	19 June 2024
The healer congratulates Angelli and José Emilio on the arrival of their first child, Rebeca cannot believe that her sister is pregnant. Alma tells Elena that Rebeca has always criticized the family she was raised in because she never forgave them for taking her away from her real parents.
104	"Ese hijo debió ser mío"	20 June 2024
Rebeca bursts into tears when she learns that Alma has passed away and blames the doctors for not saving her life. Misael gives Bruno the documents for the supposed loan they will ask for from the stock company, but in reality it will be to launder the money from the fraud he committed. Rebeca is uncomfortable at Alma's funeral because she is not well received by all the neighbors. Rebeca discovers that Brayan is investigating the farm and suspects that he is trying to burglarize it, so she offers her help. Rebeca surprises Angelli in the office and threatens to hurt her, since she will not allow the child she is expecting to be born, much less denounce her.
105	"Angelli no aparece por ningún lado"	21 June 2024
Angelli tries to escape to safety, but Rebeca threatens to shoot her and puts her in Brayan's truck against her will. José Emilio notices that Angelli is late in returning to the office and begins to look for her, Rebeca gets rid of her sister's cell phone so that it will not be traced. Rebeca leaves Angelli a tarantula so that she won't feel alone in the house where she has kidnapped her. Mónica wishes that Rebeca deprived Angelli of her freedom, as this will be the only way she will be able to get her hands on her.
106	"Has hecho que yo te odie"	24 June 2024
Angelli asks Rebeca to come to her senses and let her return home since her whole family must be looking for her, Rebeca opposes and threatens to hurt her and her child. During the search for Angelli, José Emilio finds the envelope with the pregnancy test and confirms that she is expecting his child. Rufino sends Mónica the evidence that Rebeca has kidnapped Angelli, so now she plans to unmask her to get her out of her way. José Emilio begins the search to find Angelli, so he starts screaming her name, she hears him, but cannot communicate.
107	"No voy a permitir que Rebeca recargue su odio contra ti"	25 June 2024
Rebeca enjoys all the pain she is causing Angelli, she asks her to let her go and in exchange, she will not press charges against her. Mónica manipulates Rebeca into revealing what she did to Angelli, but in exchange for her silence, she asks her to give her the shares of the company she took from Cristina and to stay away from Misael. After a heated argument with Rebeca, Angelli manages to escape from the house where she was being held hostage but suffers a fall, José Emilio finds her and asks for help to rescue her. Rebeca flees with Brayan to avoid being arrested, but during the chase they suffer an accident; Brayan abandons Rebeca.
108	"Su hija perdió la memoria"	26 June 2024
Angelli is interrogated by the authorities if she saw the faces of the people who were holding her captive, she remembers Rebeca's threat and denies that she was deprived of her freedom. Mónica arrives at the neighborhood ready to take Pedrito because she has the documents proving that he is her grandson. Wanda cannot believe that she has finally found her son; however, she keeps silent that she is Pedrito's mother because Mónica has discredited her. Angelli fears that she has lost her baby after the fall she suffered, but during a check-up she and José Emilio hear her baby's heart for the first time. Rebeca is confused and says her name is Frida Del Olmo, the doctor informs Elena that her daughter lost her memory after the blow to her head.
109	"¡Vas a ir a la cárcel Rebeca!"	27 June 2024
Mónica surprises Misael by confirming that Pedrito is his son. Pedrito rejects Misael and when he leaves the office he runs into Don Emilio who immediately takes care of him and learns that he is his great-grandson. Wanda confesses to Marisa that Pedrito is her son. Misael asks Don Emilio for advice on how to be a good father. Brayan unmasks Rebeca with the supposed idea that she has lost her memory and informs her that the police suspect that she is linked to Angelli's disappearance. Angelli has the evidence to prove that Rebeca harmed Alma, as well as Elena and Mauricio, so she is willing to send her in jail.
110	"Usted queda en calidad de detenida"	28 June 2024
Rebeca denies in front of the authorities that she killed Alma and is sure that Angelli is only accusing her because she does not want her as a sister. Alma's spirit appears to Rebeca and asks her to repent for the evil she has caused before it is too late, she begins to scream and realizes that no one is there. Monica visits Rebeca in the hospital to demand that she sign the succession of shares as they had agreed, otherwise she will make public the photos that prove she was the one who kidnapped Angelli. José Emilio is surprised that Pedrito is in his grandfather's house, Cristina and Don Emilio share the news that he is Misael's son. Agent Corral informs Rebeca that she will be detained while the investigation into what happened with Alma is carried out.
111	"O te olvidas de ella o te retiro mi apoyo"	1 July 2024
Misael takes advantage of Rebeca's amnesia to make her believe that they are a couple, she does not hesitate to ask for his help, but he declines because he does not want problems with his family. Angelli arrives at the hospital to complain to Rebeca for sending her photos of when she was kidnapped, Rebeca is sure that it was Mónica who sent them. José Emilio demands an explanation from Misael about the mortgage payments since the only thing he is causing is the interest to multiply. Romina complains to Bruno about the kiss he gave Mónica. Mónica makes it clear to Romina that Bruno only used her to get to know Rebeca's movements.
112	"Bruno te está jugando sucio"	2 July 2024
After learning that Rebeca suffered an accident and lost her memory, Doris visits her in the hospital and expresses her support for the great affection she has for her. Misael tears up Wanda's DNA test and threatens to put her in jail so that she will never go near Pedrito. Romina contacts Misael to confess that Mónica was the one who set her up so she wouldn't reveal the truth about Rebeca and also pressured her on the day of the shareholders meeting. Misael arrives at Bruno's apartment and upon entering the bedroom finds him in bed with Mónica. José Emilio delivers an image to agent Corral as proof of Angelli's disappearance, she assures him that it is the proof they needed and details that Rebeca will soon be transferred to prison.
113	"Necesitas ayuda profesional"	3 July 2024
Mónica looks for Misael to clarify what happened with Bruno, he despises her and assures her that he denies that a woman like her is his mother. Misael decides to cut his fringe, which was a symbol of union between Mónica and him, Don Emilio, seeing that there is a distance between them, asks them to fix their problems. After it is proven that Rebeca has amnesia, the judge grants her bail so that she can carry out her legal process in freedom. Rebeca is convinced that her mother will accept her legal custody; however, Elena assures her that she needs the help of a professional.
114	"¿Soy hijo de Mauricio Aranda?"	4 July 2024
Misael surprises Rebeca when he tells her that he accepted her custody because of his love for her and it is time to start being happy, she asks him to forgive her if she hurt him. Rebeca seeks out Angelli and José Emilio with the intention of apologizing, they demand that she stop lying about her amnesia and accept that killed Alma. Mónica reveals to Cristina and Adolfo that Misael's biological father is Mauricio and confesses that she made the whole family believe that she was expecting Adolfo's child in order to marry him; Misael overhears the conversation. Mónica has a heated argument with Cristina and makes evident the resentment she has for her sister, who was always the perfect daughter and preferred by their parents. Mauricio does not forgive Mónica for agreeing to murder Mauricio.
115	"Me tengo que deshacer de las evidencias"	5 July 2024
Rebeca threatens Mónica with giving evidence to the Rivero Cuéllars that Misael was the one who killed Dulce, Mónica makes her a deal and asks her to meet her at Bruno's apartment. Rebeca gives the documents to Mónica, but knowing she is in danger, she defends herself and shoots her. Misael confesses to Elena that he is in love with Rebeca, Elena assures him that she is willing to support them in everything even if Angelli and Santiago are against it. Cristina receives the results of her medical exams and confirms that she has cancer, the doctor recommends her to start treatment as soon as possible. Bruno arrives at his apartment and notices that Mónica is injured, but when he tries to revive her he is surprised by the police, he assures them that he is innocent.
116	"Perdóname Misael"	8 July 2024
Romina fears going to jail for being Rebeca's accomplice, but when she tries to leave her apartment she is arrested for the accident she caused Maty. Misael receives a call to inform him that Mónica is hospitalized because she was the victim of an attack, Rebeca confirms that she was unable to kill her. Misael swears to Mónica that the person who hurt her will go to jail, she does not hesitate to ask for forgiveness and assures him that she is a vulnerable woman, but she always wanted him to see her strong. Mónica begs Misael to beware of the vultures because they only want to take what belongs to her, she begins to feel ill and the doctors are unable to revive her.
117	"Encuentra al verdadero asesino"	9 July 2024
Misael confesses to Rebeca that he has a son and that now that they are together, he wants to give Pedrito a family. Bruno swears to Misael that he is innocent since he did not murder Mónica, but Agent Corral informs him that there is a witness who testified about the threat that Mónica received from him. Rebeca summons the Rivero Cuellar family to inform them that she is worried about Misael, he begins to investigate who is guilty of Mónica's death.
118	"Tengo información sobre el préstamo de Misael"	10 July 2024
Don Emilio convinces his family to trust Rebeca again, since there is a possibility that she is innocent of everything she is accused of, and she is the only person close to his grandson Misael. Rebeca calls Pedrito by name, Misael confirms that she faked her amnesia to deceive everyone. Pedrito begs Misael to return him to Don Emilio because he is happy with him and assures him that he does not want to live with him and even less with Rebeca. Bruno asks José Emilio for help and in exchange he is willing to provide him with information about Misael's loan. Misael returns to live with Rebeca at his grandfather's house.
119	"¿Qué podría decirte Bruno?"	11 July 2024
Don Emilio convinces Misael that Wanda should have a closer relationship with Pedrito, so he agrees to let her stay at the house for a few days. Adolfo begs Misael to put the conflicts they had behind them because he wants to make up for lost time and what he wants most is to see him happy. Rebeca informs Misael that his accounts will be reviewed by José Emilio. Brayan succeeds and destroys the harvest, Gabriel confirms to Maty that the employee they just hired is planning to rob the farm.
120	"La boda de José Emilio y Angelli se canceló"	12 July 2024
Angelli lets José Emilio know that Bruno hurt Sandy the same night Mónica was killed. Angelli receives an invitation supposedly from José Emilio, but it is actually from Rebeca as she will not allow her sister to remarry him. José Emilio discovers that Angelli and Renato are seeing each other on the sly, Angelli shows him that she received an invitation supposedly from him and they both confirm that Rebeca set them up. Fátima announces to the family that more than half of the harvest that was destined to pay for the extra orders was lost, Misael is upset and assures that she should never have been in charge of the farm. Iker presents a report where he proves that the payments of the corporation were manipulated and reveals that the only guilty party is Bruno.
121	"Ya no voy a pasarte ni una más"	15 July 2024
José Emilio gives Misael and Rebeca the tickets he had intended for his honeymoon since he canceled his wedding with Angelli, but in reality he does it to keep them away so they don't interrupt his wedding. José Emilio asks Bruno for the evidence he says he has against Misael, but in exchange, Bruno wants his freedom and assures José Emilio that he will hand over everything. Rebeca calls the restaurant to say goodbye to her mother, but Sandy reveals that she is busy with Angelli's wedding, so she and Misael decide to cancel their trip. Rebeca arrives at Angelli's wedding to congratulate her sister, but Angelli slaps her and unmasks her for the trap she set at the hotel and warns her that she will not allow her to hurt her son. Santiago threatens Misael with revealing to the Rivero Cuellar family who paid him to commit the robbery and who was responsible for Dulce's death.
122	"Es a Santiago al que tengo que callar"	16 July 2024
After being threatened by Santiago, Misael is determined to get him out of the way, so he asks Rufino to take charge. Adolfo informs the family that Mónica was murdered by a woman, as Bruno arrived at her apartment after the police received the alert call. Misael pays Rufino for his work and the police find Santiago's body, Elena is worried as she does not know anything about her son.
123	"Te voy a encontrar traicionera"	17 July 2024
When she confirms that there is no evidence that would compromise her with the authorities, Romina is determined to expose Rebeca and Misael, so she writes a letter to José Emilio. José Emilio reads Romina's letter and confirms that Misael is the only one responsible for the fraud since he opened a company with the money he stole. Misael, knowing that he is about to be caught, decides to flee the country, but first he proposes to Rebeca, who takes advantage of his carelessness to steal the evidence against him. Agent Corral shows José Emilio and the family images of the person who killed Mónica, they confirm that it is Rebeca and let Misael know. After what happened to her brother Santiago, Angelli files a complaint against Rebeca for having kidnapped her.
124	"Te tengo en mis manos"	18 July 2024
Misael follows Rebeca's steps and discovers that she also deceived him, but she does not suspect anything. Misael confronts Rebeca over the phone for having stolen documents from the company and in the face of danger decides to run her over to finish her off. José Emilio confronts Misael for having stolen from the company for his own benefit, but tries to justify himself. Despite discovering Misael's betrayal, Don Emilio does not intend to abandon him and continues to believe in his innocence. Elena prays for Rebeca's health, while her life is at stake in the operating room.
125	"Quedaste coja de por vida Rebeca"	19 July 2024
The doctor informs Elena that they were able to rescue Rebeca's leg; however, she will limp for the rest of her life. Misael confronts Rebeca about her deceptions and assures her that she will pay dearly for having taken Mónica's life; she learns that she will not be able to walk. After seeing that she is beginning to lose her hair, Cristina decides to shave it off. When Pedrito learns that a woman was to blame for separating him from Wanda, he forgives her; Misael asks his son to forgive him as well. Cristina takes advantage of the family's reunion to announce that she has cancer, José Emilio and Fátima give her all their support and affection, Misael admires his aunt's strength.
126	"Nadie va a poder separarnos"	22 July 2024
Brayan confirms to Rebeca that it was a light-eyed man who ran over her, she concludes that it was Misael. Rebeca has another hallucination and swears that if she couldn't be a mother, she won't let Angelli be one either. Angelli gives birth to her son and Rebeca escapes from the psychiatric hospital ready to ruin her happy moment. Misael realizes that José Emilio and Angelli's baby is in danger.
127	"Tu primo fue quien le disparó a Dulce"	23 July 2024
Misael calls hospital security to prevent Rebeca from kidnapping his Angelli's baby; Rebeca claims it is her son. Angelli arrives at the hospital where her brother is to share the news of the birth of her baby, Santiago wakes up from his coma when he feels her presence. Santiago confesses to José Emilio that he was present the night Dulce lost her life and the only one to blame is Misael. After learning that Misael is to blame for Dulce's death, José Emilio confronts him for murdering his sister, Don Emilio is disappointed in his grandson.
128	"Me voy a vengar de Angelli y José Emilio"	24 July 2024
Don Emilio confesses to Misael that he wants to forgive him, but the best thing to do is to stay away from him because he does not know how long it will take him to get over this pain. Rebeca will no longer be imprisoned for the homicide against Alma, since the judge ruled that she suffers from a mental disorder. Misael tells José Emilio that he is sorry for all the damage he caused to the family and assures him that he will pay back all the money he stole. Three years later, Rebeca surprises Angelli and José Emilio at their son's school.
129	"Si te atrapan no te voy a poder ayudar"	25 July 2024
Rebeca contacts Brayan to begin her revenge, but he asks for a large sum of money to help her. Cristina confronts Misael about the wound he caused when he took Dulce's life, he assures her that he is sorry and if he could turn back time he would give his life. Rebeca manages to disguise herself as a clown to kidnap José Emi, Angelli asks her not to hurt him; however, she abandons her nephew to repeat the story of her childhood. Misael asks Rebeca to forget about her revenge against Angelli and José Emilio, so he proposes to run away with him.
130	"Quiero vivir de amor para siempre"	26 July 2024
Elena apologizes to Angelli for always believing Rebeca more than her, but Angelli knows how much it hurt her mother to have lost Frida and they forgive each other. Rebeca and Misael take an eternal sleep potion to make the family believe that they died on their wedding day, but in reality they do it to escape from the law and Rebeca can take revenge on Angelli. At the funeral, Angelli forgives Rebeca for making her life miserable and wishes she had come to her senses before doing wrong. Misael leaves a farewell letter apologizing for killing Dulce and the damage he did to the company. Rebeca wakes up three meters underground and begs Brayan to dig her up. He decides to take Rebeca out first but mistakenly digs up Misael instead. Lacking oxygen, Rebeca takes her last breath and dies. Upon opening Misael's coffin, Brayan finds his corpse wrapped in money and decides to steal it, but Misael wakes up and pulls out a gun, Brayan tries to stop him from doing something and they struggle. Misael is shot dead in the coffin surrounded by his money and Brayan, escaping from the law, suffers an accident and dies. After so much suffering caused by Rebeca and Misael, Angelli agrees to marry José Emilio and in front of the altar, they swear that their love will be eternal.
