= Juan Diego Covarrubias =

Mexican actor

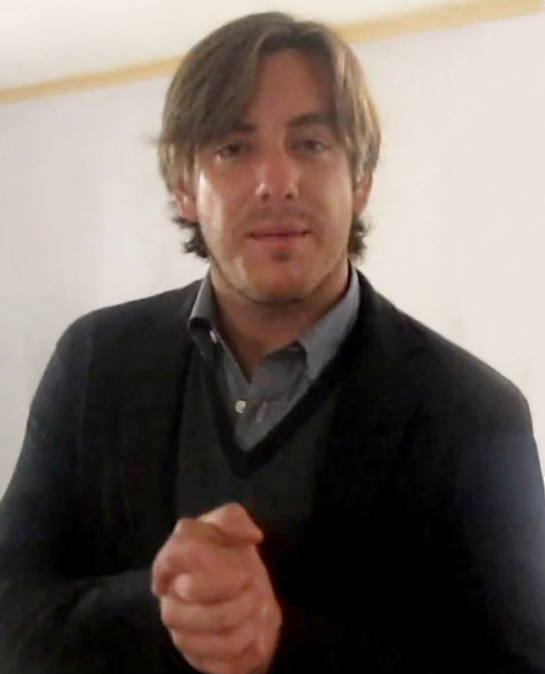
- Born: Juan Diego Covarrubias Aceves; March 24, 1987 (age 39); Guadalajara, Jalisco, Mexico
- Other name: Cova
- Occupation: Actor
- Years active: 2008–present
- Spouse: Edna Monroy (m. 2018; div. 2019)
- Partner: Renata Haro (2020–2026)
- Children: 3

Juan Diego Covarrubias (born Juan Diego Covarrubias Aceves on March 24, 1987) is a Mexican actor.

== Early life and career ==
Born in Guadalajara, Covarrubias studied at the prestigious boys school, Instituto Cumbres San Javier. He studied at the CEA of Televisa and later landed a role in the teen telenovela Atrévete a soñar, playing Johnnie. Later he joined the cast of the play Bella & Bestia. In 2010 Covarrubias appeared in the telenovela Teresa, playing a young man named Julio. One year later he played Alfredo Irabién Arteaga in the telenovela Una familia con suerte, produced by Juan Osorio.

Covarrubias also participated in the telenovela Amor Bravio produced by Carlos Moreno Laguillo, where he worked with Cristian de la Fuente, Silvia Navarro, and Leticia Calderón. In 2013 he starred in the telenovela De que te quiero, te quiero with Livia Brito, produced by Lucero Suárez.

== Filmography ==
Films
Year	Title	Role	Notes
2015	A la mala	Álvaro	Debut film
2022	¡Qué despadre!	Gabriel	Nominated - Best Supporting Actor at the Diosas de Plata

Television
Year	Title	Role	Notes
2009	Atrévete a soñar	Johnny	"Parte I: Inesperado reencuentro" (Season 1, Episode 0)
2010	Teresa	Julio	Recurring role Nom—Premios People en Español for Best Supporting Actor
2011-2012	Una familia con suerte	Alfredo Irabién Arteaga "El Rey de Copas"	Main cast Nom—TVyNovelas Awards for Best Male Revelation; Nom—Kids Choice Awards México for Favorite Supporting Actor
2012	Amor bravío	Yago Albarrán Mendiola	Supporting role
2013-2014	De que te quiero, te quiero	Diego Cáceres / Rodrigo Cáceres	Lead role Won—TVyNovelas Awards for Best Lead Actor; Won—New York Latin ACE Awards for Best Actor
2015-2016	La vecina	Antonio Andrade	Lead role
2017–present	Renta congelada	Fernando	Lead role
2017-2018	Me declaro culpable	Paolo Leiva Ruiz	Main cast
2019	Mi marido tiene más familia	Carlos Rojas	Supporting role
2019	Cita a ciegas	Carolo	Guest star
2020-2021	Vencer el desamor	Eduardo Falcón Albarrán	Main cast
2021	Diseñando tu amor	Claudio Barrios	Lead role
2024	Vivir de amor	Luciano Garza Treviño	Main cast
2024	Las hijas de la señora García	Leonardo Portilla	Main cast
2025	Papás por siempre	Bill	
2026	Sabor a ti	Tomás Sarmiento	
