= Mendoza =

Mendoza may refer to:

== Places ==
=== Argentina ===
- Greater Mendoza, the name given to the large urban conurbation around the city of Mendoza, Argentina
- Mendoza, Argentina, the capital of the province of Mendoza
- Mendoza Department, subdivision of the Mendoza Province
- Mendoza Province
- Mendoza River, a river in the Mendoza Province
- Mendoza wine, a wine region located in the Mendoza province

=== Other places ===
- Mendoza, Panama, a corregimiento in La Chorrera District, Panamá Oeste Province, Panama
- Mendoza, Peru, capital of Rodríguez de Mendoza Province, Peru
- Rodríguez de Mendoza Province, a province of the Amazonas Region, Peru
- Mendoza, Álava, Basque Country, Spain
- Mendoza, Texas, a community in Caldwell County, Texas, U.S.
- Mendoza College of Business, at the University of Notre Dame, Indiana, U.S.
- Mendoza, Uruguay, a town in Florida, Uruguay
- Mendoza del Valle del Momboy, Valera Municipality, Trujillo State, Venezuela

== People ==
- Mendoza (name), a Basque surname, and a list of people with the name
- House of Mendoza, a family of Spanish nobles who originated from Álava, Basque Country, Spain

== Other uses ==
- 3868 Mendoza, a main-belt asteroid
- Codex Mendoza, an Aztec codex, created fourteen years after the 1521 Spanish conquest of Mexico
- Fat Dog Mendoza, animated series
- Jackson Mendoza, short-lived Australian pop duo
- Monkey stick, called mendoza or mendozer, a traditional English percussion instrument
- Mendoza (The Mysterious Cities of Gold), a French-Japanese animated series that ran from 1982 to 1983
- Mendoza (spider), a genus of jumping spiders
- Mendoza Line, a baseball term
- Productos Mendoza, a sports rifle and arms manufacturer in Mexico
- Universidad de Mendoza, Mendoza, Argentina

== See also ==
- Mandoza (1978–2016), South African kwaito recording artist
- Mendonça, a Portuguese variation of the surname
