= Los hilos del pasado =

- Genre: Telenovela
- Based on: Cristal by Delia Fiallo
- Developed by: José Alberto Castro; Vanesa Varela
- Written by: Patricio Saiz; Fabiola López Neri
- Directed by: Salvador Garcini; Luis Manzo
- Starring: Yadhira Carrillo; David Zepeda; Eduardo Santamarina; Emmanuel Palomares; Bárbara López
- Theme music composer: Fernanda Castro; Gelin Hau
- Opening theme: "Hilos del pasado" by Cristian Castro & Fernanda Castro
- Composers: Armando López Perez; Carlos Daniel Garibay Galicia; Francisco Cadenas Jaimes
- Country of origin: Mexico
- Original language: Spanish
- No. of seasons: 1
- No. of episodes: 60

Production
- Executive producer: José Alberto Castro
- Producers: Ernesto Hernández; Fausto Sainz
- Editors: Juan Ordóñez; Héctor Flores; Arturo Rodríguez; Alejandro Iglesias; Mauricio de Jesús Manzano
- Camera setup: Multi-camera
- Production company: TelevisaUnivision

Original release
- Network: Univision
- Release: 10 September – 5 December 2025

Related
- El privilegio de amar (1998); Triunfo del amor (2010)

Los hilos del pasado (English: Threads of the Past) is a Mexican telenovela produced by José Alberto Castro for TelevisaUnivision. It is based on the 1985 Venezuela telenovela Cristal, created by Delia Fiallo. The series stars Yadhira Carrillo, Bárbara López, Emmanuel Palomares and David Zepeda. It aired on Univision from 10 September 2025 to 5 December 2025. In Mexico, the series aired on Las Estrellas from 27 October 2025 to 16 January 2026.

== Cast ==
=== Main ===
- Yadhira Carrillo as Carolina Guillén
  - Gia Franceschi as young Carolina
- Eduardo Santamarina as Manuel Navarro
- David Zepeda as Father Salvador Villaseñor
  - Manuel Duarte as young Salvador
- Emmanuel Palomares as Carlos Navarro
- Bárbara López as Cristina
- Natasha Dupeyrón as Tamara Ontiveros
- Azela Robinson as María Luisa
- Laura Flores as Elena
- Mark Tacher as Leonardo
- Rafael Inclán as Benjamín
- Raquel Garza as Catalina
- Daniel Tovar as Ricardo
- José Pablo Minor as Alonso
- Lorena Meritano as Jaqueline
- Eugenio Bartilotti as Tony
- Clarisa González as Romina Navarro
- Daniela Martínez as Marisol
- Valeria Masini as Lorena
- Joaquín Calatayud as Omar
- Sergio Goyri as Ramiro

=== Recurring and guest stars ===
- Luz María Aguilar as Mother Superior
- Rodrigo Murray as Roberto
- Rosita Bouchot as Martita
- Pía Sanz as Violeta
- Ruth Rosas as Mother Consuelo
- Hany Portocarrero as Sandra
- Erika de la Rosa as Roberta
- Nailea Norvind as Rebeca Ontiveros

== Production ==
=== Development ===
In February 2025, José Alberto Castro announced he would be producing a remake of the 1998 telenovela El Privilegio de Amar, itself an adaptation of the 1985 Venezuelan telenovela Cristal. The working title of the telenovela was Los hilos del destino. On 13 May 2025, the telenovela was presented at TelevisaUnivision's upfront for the 2025–2026 television season, announcing Los hilos del pasado as the official title.

=== Casting ===
On 3 March 2025, Yadhira Carrillo was announced in the lead role of Carolina Guillén, making her return to acting after seventeen years. Carrillo made a cameo appearance as Carolina in the final episode of Las hijas de la señora García. On 5 April 2025, Eduardo Santamarina was cast in the role of Carolina's husband. On 11 April 2025, Bárbara López and Emmanuel Palomares were cast in leading roles. The complete cast was announced on 16 April 2025. On 2 May 2025, Natasha Dupeyrón was cast in the role of Tamara.

=== Filming ===
Filming of the telenovela began on 21 April 2025 in forum 15 of Televisa San Ángel. In May, filming occurred on the beaches of Isla Mujeres in Quintana Roo. From 2 to 11 August 2025, filming occurred in Varenna, Villa Erba, and Milan in Italy. Later that month, filming took place in Miami.

== Episodes ==
No.	Title	U.S. air date	Mexico air date	U.S. viewers (millions)	Mexico viewers (millions)
1	"Amor primero"	10 September 2025	27 October 2025	N/A	4.58
2	"Mujer de carácter"	11 September 2025	28 October 2025	N/A	4.35
3	"Mucha ilusión"	12 September 2025	29 October 2025	N/A	4.31
4	"Otra oportunidad"	15 September 2025	30 October 2025	N/A	4.18
5	"Mujeres de carácter"	16 September 2025	31 October 2025	N/A	4.49
6	"Caminos cruzados"	17 September 2025	3 November 2025	N/A	4.23
7	"Madre preocupada"	18 September 2025	4 November 2025	N/A	4.20
8	"Confesionario"	19 September 2025	5 November 2025	N/A	4.47
9	"El hijo de la jefa"	22 September 2025	6 November 2025	N/A	4.22
10	"Insiste"	23 September 2025	7 November 2025	N/A	4.27
11	"Mujer del pasado"	24 September 2025	10 November 2025	N/A	4.19
12	"Nace una estrella"	26 September 2025	11 November 2025	N/A	4.32
13	"Imperdonable"	29 September 2025	12 November 2025	N/A	4.24
14	"Mujeriego"	30 September 2025	13 November 2025	N/A	4.26
15	"Miami"	1 October 2025	14 November 2025	N/A	4.23
16	"Error de modelo"	2 October 2025	17 November 2025	N/A	4.16
17	"Perdón"	3 October 2025	18 November 2025	N/A	4.29
18	"Lo que nos une"	6 October 2025	19 November 2025	N/A	4.29
19	"Sentimiento difícil"	7 October 2025	20 November 2025	N/A	4.13
20	"Una posibilidad"	8 October 2025	21 November 2025	N/A	4.03
21	"Explicaciones"	9 October 2025	24 November 2025	1.37	4.26
22	"Fiesta de cumpleaños"	10 October 2025	25 November 2025	1.32	4.28
23	"Dolor del pasado"	13 October 2025	26 November 2025	1.45	4.35
24	"El abrazo"	14 October 2025	27 November 2025	1.07	4.28
25	"De hijo a padre"	15 October 2025	28 November 2025	1.21	4.28
26	"En la playa"	16 October 2025	1 December 2025	1.03	4.34
27	"El día después"	17 October 2025	2 December 2025	1.18	4.45
28	"La peor noticia"	20 October 2025	3 December 2025	1.22	4.37
29	"Conversaciones"	21 October 2025	4 December 2025	1.21	4.31
30	"Hasta el limite"	22 October 2025	5 December 2025	1.26	4.15
31	"El precio de tu hija"	23 October 2025	8 December 2025	1.10	TBA
32	"Amigo del pasado"	27 October 2025	9 December 2025	1.27	4.70
33	"Siempre desconfianza"	28 October 2025	10 December 2025	1.39	4.08
34	"La boda sin amor"	29 October 2025	11 December 2025	1.37	3.73
35	"Esposa difícil"	30 October 2025	12 December 2025	1.33	4.50
36	"Viaje a Europa"	31 October 2025	15 December 2025	1.26	4.17
37	"Amor en Italia"	31 October 2025	16 December 2025	1.26	4.69
38	"No más sueños"	3 November 2025	17 December 2025	1.35	4.55
39	"En el automóvil"	4 November 2025	18 December 2025	1.43	TBA
40	"Perderlo todo"	5 November 2025	19 December 2025	1.30	TBA
41	"La imprudencia"	6 November 2025	22 December 2025	1.38	TBA
42	"Solo mentiras"	7 November 2025	23 December 2025	1.37	TBA
43	"Ojo por ojo"	10 November 2025	24 December 2025	1.44	TBA
44	"El hotel"	11 November 2025	25 December 2025	1.40	TBA
45	"Tenerlo de regreso"	12 November 2025	26 December 2025	1.57	TBA
46	"No estás sola"	14 November 2025	29 December 2025	1.42	TBA
47	"El otro nacimiento"	17 November 2025	30 December 2025	N/A	TBA
48	"Nada cambia"	18 November 2025	31 December 2025	N/A	TBA
49	"Conferencia de prensa"	19 November 2025	1 January 2026	N/A	TBA
50	"La gran verdad"	20 November 2025	2 January 2026	N/A	TBA
51	"Las explicaciones"	21 November 2025	5 January 2026	N/A	4.41
52	"Ayuda importante"	24 November 2025	6 January 2026	N/A	4.54
53	"Decisión tomada"	25 November 2025	7 January 2026	N/A	4.75
54	"Perder la razón"	27 November 2025	8 January 2026	N/A	4.89
55	"Milán"	28 November 2025	9 January 2026	N/A	4.71
56	"El incendio"	1 December 2025	12 January 2026	N/A	4.51
57	"Traición cercana"	2 December 2025	13 January 2026	N/A	4.83
58	"Llega la justicia"	4 December 2025	14 January 2026	N/A	TBA
59	"Sufrimiento total"	5 December 2025	15 January 2026	N/A	4.99
60	"Un último obstáculo"	5 December 2025	16 January 2026	N/A	4.71

== Release ==
Los hilos del pasado premiered first in the United States on Univision on 10 September 2025. In Mexico, the series premiered on Las Estrellas on 27 October 2025.

== Reception ==
=== Mexico ratings ===
Viewership and ratings per season of Los hilos del pasado
Season	Timeslot (CT)	Episodes	First aired		Last aired		Avg. viewers (millions)
Season	Timeslot (CT)	Episodes	Date	Viewers (millions)	Date	Viewers (millions)	Avg. viewers (millions)
1	Mon–Fri 9:30 p.m.	46	27 October 2025	4.58	16 January 2026	4.71	4.38

=== Awards and nominations ===
Year	Award	Category	Nominated	Result	Ref
2026	Premios Juventud	My Favorite Actress	Yadhira Carrillo	Nominated	
2026	Premios Juventud	My Favorite Actor	Emmanuel Palomares	Nominated	
2026	Produ Awards	Best Family Telenovela	Los hilos del pasado	Pending	
2026	Produ Awards	Best Lead Actor - Family Telenovela	Eduardo Santamarina	Pending	
2026	Produ Awards	Best Lead Actor - Family Telenovela	Emmanuel Palomares	Pending	
2026	Produ Awards	Best Supporting Actress - Family Telenovela	Natasha Dupeyrón	Pending	
2026	Produ Awards	Best Supporting Actor - Family Telenovela	Mark Tacher	Pending	
