= Ramona (2000 TV series) =

- Genre: Telenovela; Romance; Drama
- Created by: Helen Hunt Jackson
- Based on: Ramona by Helen Hunt Jackson
- Written by: Lucy Orozco; Humberto Robles; Francisco Sánchez; José Tamez
- Directed by: Alberto Cortés; Nicolás Echevarría; Felipe Nájera
- Starring: Kate del Castillo; Eduardo Palomo; Helena Rojo; René Strickler; Sergio Sendel
- Theme music composer: Ricardo Gallardo
- Opening theme: Ramona by Tambuco
- Country of origin: Mexico
- Original language: Spanish
- No. of episodes: 74

Production
- Executive producer: Lucy Orozco
- Producers: Humberto Robles; Juan Manuel Orozco
- Production locations: Durango, Mexico
- Cinematography: Jesús Nájera Saro; Óscar Morales
- Camera setup: Multi-camera
- Running time: 21-22 minutes (episodes 1-10); 41-44 minutes (episodes 11-74)
- Production company: Televisa

Original release
- Network: Canal de las Estrellas
- Release: April 3 – July 14, 2000

Related
- Ramona (1910); Ramona (1916); Ramona (1928); Ramona (1936)

Ramona is a Mexican telenovela produced by Lucy Orozco for Televisa based on the 1884 novel Ramona by Helen Hunt Jackson. It premiered on April 3, 2000 and ended on July 14, 2000. The series stars Kate del Castillo, Eduardo Palomo, Helena Rojo, René Strickler and Sergio Sendel. It was the last telenovela of Eduardo Palomo, who died in 2003 of a heart attack.

== Plot ==
Ramona returns to the family ranch after years of being educated by nuns. Ramona reunites with her mother and brother and childhood friend, the Indian Alejandro. Ramona falls in love with Alejandro and the couple is faced with the prejudices of being an interracial couple.

The family selects a suitable husband for Ramona and a wedding is planned. Family secrets come to light exposing the truth of Ramona's birth and her Indian heritage. The ill-fated romance continues when Alejandro kidnaps Ramona at the altar.

The two enjoy a short-lived honeymoon before Alejandro is taken captive by the authorities and is hanged. Ramona returns home to live with her mother and Felipe who has loved her since childhood. Ramona is pregnant with Alejandro's child, so she and Felipe get married.

This ill-fated romance is played out against the backdrop of the impending statehood of the Mexican territory, which ultimately becomes what is most often referred to as California.

== Cast ==
- Kate del Castillo as Maria Ramona Moreno Gonzaga
- Eduardo Palomo as Alejandro de Asís
- Helena Rojo as Doña Ramona Gonzaga Vda. de Moreno
- René Strickler as Felipe Moreno Gonzaga
- Sergio Sendel as Rex/Jack Green
- Antonio Medellín as Don Pablo de Asís
- Rafael Inclán as Juan Canito
- Angelina Peláez as Martha Canito
- Vanessa Bauche as Margarita Canito
- René Casados as Angus O'Fail
- Ricardo Blume as Ruy Coronado
- Felipe Nájera as Fernando Coronado
- Gabriela Murray as Analupe Coronado
- Nicky Mondellini as Beatriz de Echague
- Chela Castro as Perpetua de Echague
- Luis Couturier as César de Echagüe
- Juan Ríos Cantú as El Norteño
- Álvaro Carcaño as Father Salvatierra
- Kristoff as Davis
- Raúl Ochoa as Merryl
- Ramón Menéndez as Dr. Thomas
- Isela Vega as Matea
- Shaula Vega as Manuela
- Roberto "Flaco" Guzmán as Nepo
- Andrés García Jr. as Billy Dubois
- Luis Bayardo as Father Sarriá
- Paty Díaz as Carmen
- Oscar Traven as Abraham McQueen
- Montserrat Olivier as Doris
- Eugenio Cobo as General Alonso Moreno
- Jorge Capin as Pepe
- Tony Dalton as Tom
- Antonio Escobar as Antonio
- Francisco Casasola as Lobo Solitario
- Martín Rojas as Sebastián Lorenzo
- Andreas Pearce as Prescott
- Christian Tappan as Colorado
- Zamorita as Negro Memphis
- Ernesto Bog as Marcos
- José Luis Avendaño as Lucio
- Alicia del Lago as Sofía
- Marcela Morett as Yahale
- Hilda Nájera as Polita
- Maja Schnellman as Betty
- Ximena Adriana as Delgadima
- Luis de Icaza as Douglas
- Claudio Sorel as Dr. Oviedo
- Daniel Gauvry as Dr. Brown

== Awards ==
Year	Award	Category	Nominee	Result
2001	19th TVyNovelas Awards	Best Female Revelation	Montserrat Olivier	Nominated
2001	19th TVyNovelas Awards	Special Award for Best Art Design and Decor	Ricardo Navarrete; Manuel Domínguez	Won
