= Las hijas de la señora García =

- Genre: Telenovela
- Based on: Mrs. Fazilet and Her Daughters by Sırma Yanık
- Developed by: José Alberto Castro; Vanesa Varela
- Written by: Patricio Saiz; Ricardo Avilés; María Chávez
- Directed by: Salvador Garcini; Fez Noriega
- Starring: María Sorté; Guillermo García Cantú; Ela Velden; Oka Giner; Brandon Peniche; Juan Diego Covarrubias; Emmanuel Palomares
- Theme music composer: Gloria Trevi
- Opening theme: "Cueste lo que cueste" by Gloria Trevi
- Composers: Armando López Perez; Carlos Daniel Garibay Galicia; Francisco Cadenas Jaimes
- Country of origin: Mexico
- Original language: Spanish
- No. of seasons: 1
- No. of episodes: 82

Production
- Executive producer: José Alberto Castro
- Producers: Ernesto Hernández; Fausto Sainz
- Editors: Juan Ordóñez; Héctor Flores; Arturo Rodríguez
- Camera setup: Multi-camera
- Production company: TelevisaUnivision

Original release
- Network: Las Estrellas
- Release: 11 November 2024 – 2 March 2025

Las hijas de la señora García (English: Mrs. García and Her Daughters) is a Mexican telenovela produced by José Alberto Castro for TelevisaUnivision. It is based on the 2017 Turkish series Mrs. Fazilet and Her Daughters, created by Sırma Yanık. The series stars María Sorté, Ela Velden and Oka Giner. It aired on Las Estrellas from 11 November 2024 to 2 March 2025.

== Plot ==
Ofelia García is a woman who dreams of luxury and wealth, and to fulfill her dreams she uses her youngest daughter Mar. She takes her to castings so that she can become famous and, although Mar is a beautiful woman, she has not been able to get anywhere. In contrast, Valeria, Mrs. García's eldest daughter, is a woman with a natural but hidden beauty, who takes care of her family. For her there is no choice but to work hard, which makes her clash a lot with her mother, because it reminds her a lot of her late husband.

Arturo Portilla, the son of one of the most important textile families in the country, announces that there will be a search to find the woman who will be the next image of their sportswear line and Ofelia sees this as the perfect opportunity to change her life so that she and her daughters can leave poverty behind. Meanwhile, the Portilla family is going through one of the worst moments in their lives, with the death of Cecilia, the matriarch of the family. Leonardo is the eldest son, but everyone knows that Paula, his wife, is with him out of interest. Arturo is an inveterate womanizer. Nicolás is the most responsible of them all and the youngest is Camila, who has never wanted to work in the company.

The destinies of the two families are united when Ofelia fills in as housekeeper at the Portilla's mansion and decides to take Mar with her, with the intention of introducing her to the family, since she is determined that Mar will be the image of the new clothing line. At the same time, the tough personality of Valeria, who meets Arturo at the gym where she works, changes Arturo's way of being and as time goes by, he falls in love with her, without imagining that Nicolás also finds love with Valeria, who captures his heart because of the way she is. To top it off, Luis Portilla, moved by Mar's sweetness, decides to protect her when she is most vulnerable and to everyone's surprise, he makes a decision that changes the lives of the two families, without imagining the complications it will unleash.

== Cast ==
=== Main ===
- María Sorté as Ofelia García
- Guillermo García Cantú as Luis Portilla
- Ela Velden as Mar Sánchez García
- Oka Giner as Valeria Sánchez García
- Brandon Peniche Arturo Portilla
- Juan Diego Covarrubias as Leonardo Portilla
- Emmanuel Palomares as Nicolás Portilla
- Mónica Dionne as Graciela Portilla
- Geraldine Bazán as Paula Escalante de Portilla
- Álex Perea as Juan Chávez
- Luis Gatica as Jacinto Chávez
- Roxana Castellanos as Susana Guzmán
- Macarena Miguel as Camila Portilla
- Alejandra Jurado as Amparo
- Claudia Bouza as Priscila Góngora
- Nuria Bages as Rocío Lara

=== Recurring and guest stars ===
- Laura Flores as Cecilia Borbón de Portilla
- Arlette Pacheco as Gloria González
- Manuel Alcaraz as Saúl Jiménez
- Daniela Martínez as Michelle
- Sian Chiong as Mateo Jiménez
- Yadhira Carrillo as Carolina Guillén

== Production ==
=== Development ===
In May 2024, it was reported that José Alberto Castro would be producing a telenovela titled Señora. In July 2024, it was announced that the telenovela would be a remake of the 2017 Turkish television series Mrs. Fazilet and Her Daughters. Filming began on 5 August 2024, with Las hijas de la señora García being confirmed as the title of the telenovela.

=== Casting ===
On 3 July 2024, María Sorté was announced in the lead role, with Juan Diego Covarrubias cast in a main role. A week later, Oka Giner, Ela Velden, Brandon Peniche, Álex Perea, Emmanuel Palomares, Guillermo García Cantú and Geraldine Bazán were cast in main roles. Additional cast members were announced on 5 August 2024.

== Episodes ==
No.	Title	Original release date	Mexico viewers (millions)
1	"La pobreza acabó con mi belleza"	11 November 2024 (Note: Premiered early online through Las Estrellas website on 8 November 2024.)	2.09
Priscila complains to Arturo for partying with other women, publicly humiliating her by posting it on social media. Ofelia asks Mar to stay away from Juan since he is not the man who will give her the millionaire lifestyle she deserves; Mar is furious to see how her mother mistreats Juan. Valeria collides with Arturo at the gym and upon seeing her injury, he offers to help her.
2	"Tu belleza nos va a cambiar la vida"	12 November 2024	2.23
Valeria's boss orders her to return home while her wound heals and to take advantage of the time to reconsider her aesthetic appearance as a gym employee. Juan tells Mar that he has a plan so that they can be together without having to hide from their mothers. Luis fears that Arturo's ideas will end up hurting the brand, since it is the first time he takes charge of a project in the company. Mar is late for the audition and Ofelia is forced to blackmail Arturo in order to get her daughter a chance.
3	"Bienvenida a su nueva casa, Señora García"	13 November 2024	2.23
Juan arranges for Susana to miss her job interview at the Portilla family's house and Ofelia attends instead. Ofelia arrives at her job interview and celebrates that she is on the verge of achieving all her goals and ambitions; she manages to gain Cecilia's respect and is filled in on all the tasks she will have to perform at the mansion. Luis arrives home and when he greets Cecilia, he finds her passed out.
4	"Entre ricos hay mucha envidia"	14 November 2024	2.45
Despite their efforts, the paramedics declare Cecilia dead, devastating the Portilla family with the news. Mar confesses to Ofelia that she is in love with Juan and Ofelia shows her the future that awaits her if she decides to marry him. Camila sees Paula mocking her grief and confronts her by blaming her for her mother's death. Luis is horrified to see Ruth at Cecilia's funeral, but she is glad to have been able to see her son up close.
5	"Lo que sientes no se cura"	15 November 2024	1.96
Paula learns that Cecilia was suffering from a terminal illness and decides to reveal the secret without first consulting Luis. Ofelia returns to the Portilla family home to demand that the agreement to replace Gloria while she is away be respected. Valeria uses her grief over the loss of her father to offer her condolences to Arturo. Thanks to her new job, Ofelia convinces Mar to give in to ambition to get ahead in life.
6	"Tienes que ser más lista"	18 November 2024	1.97
Valeria assures that Ofelia is responsible for her father's death because of her insatiable ambition while he was working tirelessly. Juan confronts Ofelia and ask her straight out why she opposes his relationship with Mar. Luis finds Rocío outside his house demanding to see her son; Ofelia sees them and decides to stay to be well aware of everything that happens in the mansion. Mar accidentally collides with Paula and she explodes for having ruined her clothes; she recognizes her as one of the models in Arturo and Nicolás' contest.
7	"Ustedes nadan en dinero"	19 November 2024	1.99
Valeria accompanies Arturo home to make sure he arrives safely, but they end up suffering an accident. Ofelia suffers when she sees that Mar's only ambition is to be happy with Juan, regardless of the fact that they live in poverty. Ofelia swears to Nicolás that she will bring justice against the Portilla family if anything bad happens to Valeria. The doctor warns that thanks to a donor, Arturo will be able to undergo surgery and will have a good chance of surviving his accident.
8	"Esto apenas comienza"	20 November 2024	N/A
Valeria wakes up in the hospital and worries more about Arturo's health than her own well-being. Susana arrives home and learns that Juan hid everything from her about Gloria's job that Ofelia ended up receiving. Ofelia makes sure to receive the press when Valeria leaves the hospital to make the most of her moment of fame. Arturo decides to answer the journalists' questions by pretending that Valeria is his girlfriend.
9	"Todo va a salir a la luz"	21 November 2024	2.29
Graciela thanks Ofelia for Mar's sacrifice, but does not let her forget that she is at the Portilla mansion for work. Paula manipulates Leonardo to act against his siblings so that he can inherit the Portilla family legacy. Valeria visits the Portilla mansion to confront Nicolás for his humiliation at the hotel. Despite being remorseful for the scandal, Ofelia returns Nicolás his money to show that she will always support her daughter. Arturo believes he is falling in love with Valeria and offers her a job to spend more time with her.
10	"El lugar que me corresponde"	22 November 2024	2.17
Ofelia learns that Mar got into trouble because of Paula's orders and vows to take revenge. Now that she knows that Valeria and Arturo are dating, Ofelia confronts him to find out what his intentions are with her daughter. Juan proposes to Mar that she become his wife to prevent anything or anyone from separating them again. Susana assures Mar that she has become as ambitious as Ofelia and threatens her to stay away from Juan forever.
11	"La suerte no es la misma para todos"	25 November 2024	2.42
Gloria learns who Mrs. García really is and decides to return to the Portilla mansion to put a stop to her deceit. Arturo notices the flooding at Valeria's house and decides to help her solve her plumbing problem. Nicolás complains to Arturo for continuing to see Valeria despite the problems this has caused in the company and the family. Arturo warns Ofelia about the flood in her house and offers her family to live in the Portilla mansion.
12	"Era una mujer muy diferente"	26 November 2024	2.24
Although Valeria decides to stay at home, Ofelia and Mar pack their bags to start their new life at the Portilla mansion. Priscila takes advantage of her visit to Camila to convince Arturo to get back together. While Mar cleans Camila's bedroom, she sees her and confronts her, believing that she broke in to steal her dresses. Valeria's sickness worsens to such a degree that she begins to hallucinate that her late father has returned to see her.
13	"El corazón cegado por el dinero"	27 November 2024	2.37
Gloria manages to regain consciousness and mentions Ofelia, which Susana takes as a revelation of her guilt. Priscila decides to peek into Arturo's room, but is surprised to see that Valeria was with him earlier. Seeing Priscila's pain, Camila decides to support her in separating Arturo and Valeria or she will no longer consider him her brother. In tears, Susana confronts Ofelia, accusing her in front of the neighbors that she is to blame for all the misfortunes her family is going through.
14	"Perdóname, papá"	28 November 2024	N/A
Despite the evidence, Paula fails to prove that Mar stole Cecilia's perfume, making a fool of herself in front of Graciela. Ofelia visits Valeria in her old house and confesses why it is difficult for her to maintain a good relationship with her. Thanks to Susana's intrigues, Chelo decides to take steps to remove Valeria from her childhood home. Paula warns Camila about the perfume theft and in a fit of anger, Camila attacks Mar without caring about the consequences.
15	"Aunque sea tenía un techo"	29 November 2024	2.30
Ofelia takes advantage of Camila's pain to demand that she leave Mar alone. Ofelia learns that they lost their house because of Susana and threatens her with revenge. Luis realizes the mistake he made in raising his children and demands that they change their ways or leave the house. Valeria refuses Ximena's help and ends up back at home, but sleeping outside.
16	"Eres nuestra última esperanza"	2 December 2024	N/A
Seeing himself obliged to solve Mar's problems, Juan decides to steal his great-grandmother's jewelry in order to replace Cecilia's perfume. Arturo surprises Valeria with the news that he bought her house so that she can stop worrying about having a roof over her head. Valeria refuses to believe that Arturo's feelings for her are real and decides to reject the house. Ofelia is furious when she finds the engagement ring that Juan gave Mar.
17	"Se robaron mi razón de vivir"	3 December 2024	2.21
Seeing how each one suffers in their respective homes, Mar and Juan decide to escape together to start a new life. Ofelia attacks Susana, claiming that she had something to do with Mar's abduction. Ofelia confesses her regret for having beaten her daughter and Valeria confirms that Mar did decide to leave of her own free will. Mar and Juan confess all the love they feel for each other and sleep together for the first time.
18	"¡Nos asaltaron!"	4 December 2024	2.40
Arturo confesses his feelings to Valeria, but she slaps him. Mar learns that Juan is wanted by the police for having committed a crime. Arturo shows Valeria that sometimes weakness is proof of strength. Nicolás reveals to Ofelia that Arturo is the person who bought her old house.
19	"Las oportunidades que te da la vida"	5 December 2024	N/A
Mar is surprised by Ofelia's reaction when she returns home after running away with Juan. Upon leaving the hospital, Juan is intercepted by the police for the alleged crime Ofelia blames him for. Susana begs Ofelia to take pity on Juan and free him, but she enjoys watching her suffer.
20	"Nunca vuelvo a confiar en ti"	6 December 2024	N/A
Arturo feels so confident of winning Valeria's heart that he bets his winnings with Nicolás. Juan gets involved in a prison fight and ends up being blamed for starting it all. Mar feels betrayed by Valeria when she sees that she was selected as the face in Arturo's campaign. Valeria despises Arturo for having used the photo he took of her outside her house without permission.
21	"Quiero un millón de pesos"	9 December 2024	N/A
Luis decides to withdraw all the company's support from his sons in order to continue with his clothing line. Knowing that she has everything to gain, Ofelia demands one million pesos for having used Valeria as a model. Valeria refuses to have anything to do with Arturo's campaign no matter how much money she will be paid. Arturo shows Luis his reasons for choosing Valeria as a model.
22	"¡Yo no hice nada!"	10 December 2024	N/A
Valeria goes to a work appointment without knowing it is at Priscila's house, who is ready to confront her. Arturo learns that his campaign is a success, but he is in trouble for using Valeria's image without her permission. Priscila's father makes sure Valeria pays for asSaúlting his daughter. Arturo is so sure of Valeria's innocence that he vows to Ofelia to do whatever it takes to free her.
23	"Una mujer única"	11 December 2024	N/A
Arturo makes a scene in order to be taken to the police station to keep Valeria company. While helping Valeria get out of prison, Nicolás regrets having judged her as a social climber. Priscila is willing to free Valeria from the accusations against her in exchange for Arturo leaving her to return to her side. Nicolás is forced to apologize to Valeria in the hope that he will be able to convince her to participate in the campaign.
24	"Ninguna como Ofelia García"	12 December 2024	N/A
Valeria agrees to help Nicolás as long as he refuses the million-dollar deal they had made with Ofelia. Ofelia meets Rocío again, but this time she does not allow her to flee without telling her who she really is. Saúl manages to meet with Arturo to catch up on their lives and get closer to Paula. Camila confirms her decision to help Juan when she learns that he is in prison thanks to Ofelia and Mar's actions.
25	"Lo hice por ti"	13 December 2024	N/A
Jacinto confronts Ofelia to demand that Mar stay away from Juan and stop visiting him in jail. Paula reveals to Chema an alleged fraud by Arturo that could endanger the family and the company. Arturo proves that Priscila's accusations against Valeria are lies. Valeria confirms that Arturo's feelings are real by seeing how he managed to prove her innocence and thanks him by confessing her love.
26	"La verdad siempre se sabe"	16 December 2024	N/A
Despite enjoying her kiss with Arturo, Valeria assures him that it will never happen again. Paula receives a bold gift from Saúl that provokes suspicions of a terrible secret. Juan questions Camila about Mar to find out if it is true that there is someone else in her life. Mar decides to get out of doubt and takes a pregnancy test, which turns out to be positive.
27	"Acabar con la maldita pobreza"	17 December 2024	N/A
Priscila attacks Valeria and fills the house with turpentine to kill her. Ofelia takes advantage of the opportunity left by Priscila and burns down her house, thus killing all the pain of the past. The doctor warns Luis to avoid all the stress in his life or he might suffer a heart attack from which he will not survive. Mar confesses to Ofelia that she is pregnant.
28	"No soy cruel, soy realista"	18 December 2024	N/A
Ofelia throws all the consequences of Mar's pregnancy in her face, assuring her that she ruined her life because of an oversight. The doctor warns Francisco that Priscila has suffered a psychotic break and must be seen urgently by a specialist. Valeria complains to Arturo for having accompanied Priscila while the rest of the team worked to find the ideal outfit for her. Ofelia finds Mar outside the women's health clinic and Mar tells her that her criticisms led her to make this decision.
29	"¿Por qué no puedo tenerte, Valeria?"	19 December 2024	N/A
Luis manages to stop Mar from jumping off the bridge and offers her his friendship so that she won't try it again. Seeing Valeria's sadness, Nicolás demands that Arturo respect her decision and stay away from her. Susana learns that Juan was hospitalized and seeing Valeria, she doesn't hesitate to make her pay for the damages caused by Mar and Ofelia.
30	"Puedo tomar mis propias decisiones"	20 December 2024	N/A
Valeria finds in Nicolás the confidence to explain why she refuses to change her hair. Seeing Valeria's performance in front of the camera, Arturo decides to take it in his hands and photograph her the way only he knows how. Arturo invites Saúl to dinner at the house and Paula is surprised for fear that he will reveal the past they shared. Luis warns his children of his decision to make changes in his life to teach them a lesson.
31	"Voy a protegerte casándome contigo"	23 December 2024	N/A
Luis knows that the only way to save Mar is to marry her. Luis proposes to Mar to fake their marriage because he wants to teach his children a lesson, but he wants the child she is carrying in her womb to carry his last name. Camila visits Juan at his house and tells him that Mar has been dating her father and that she is going to marry him. Valeria freaks out when she learns that Mar is going to marry Luis and holds her mother responsible for her sister's decision.
32	"Es hora de negociar"	24 December 2024	N/A
Valeria scorns her mother for forcing Mar to marry an older man, Ofelia feels insulted and slaps her. Camila insults Mar for wanting to marry her father, but Mar warns her that now she must respect her because she is about to become the lady of the house. Ofelia seeks out Luis to ask for a guarantee for Mar, since she wants him to pay for every day they are married, but he will not be blackmailed. Juan congratulates Ofelia for marrying Mar to the man she really wanted for her daughter.
33	"Mar y Luis unen sus vidas para siempre"	25 December 2024	N/A
Valeria complains to her mother for hiding from her that Mar terminated her pregnancy, Ofelia holds her responsible for that decision since she also stole her sister's dreams. Susana is sure that Ofelia was the one who caused Gloria's accident, so she mentions her name and Gloria begins to remember her. Mar upon seeing her mother assures her that she fulfilled her wish of having a great life, Ofelia congratulates her because she is about to become Luis Portilla's wife. Camila arrives at her father's wedding and announces to everyone present that she married Juan, Mar bursts into tears when she hears the news.
34	"La señora de la casa"	26 December 2024	N/A
Mar cries inconsolably when she confirms that she has lost Juan, Ofelia looks for her daughter, but Mar blames her for ruining his life. Mar arrives at the hospital to check on Luis' health, but Leonardo assures her that she doesn't belong there; Ofelia comes to her daughter's defense. Juan reveals to his parents that he married Camila and that they will now live under the same roof. Ofelia convinces Mar to spend the night in her bedroom and start enjoying her new life.
35	"¿Quién es mi hijo?"	27 December 2024	N/A
Susana lashes out against Ofelia and assures Mar that it was her mother who caused Gloria's accident, Ofelia asks for proof of her accusations. Mar, seeing all the problems the Portilla family has, is terrified, but Paula takes advantage of her vulnerability to gain her trust and get closer to her. Juan assures Mar that she married Luis only for money and to follow her mother's orders, she slaps him and makes it clear that even though he married Camila, she doesn't hate him. Rocío asks Ofelia to help her investigate who her son is, Arturo or Nicolás.
36	"Haré lo que sea necesario"	30 December 2024	N/A
Luis takes Mar to a paradise beach and she is fascinated when she sees the ocean for the first time. Nicolás decides to hire a consultant out of his own pocket to teach Valeria how to be a professional model. Luis begins to see Juan as a danger to his family and assures Mar that he will never bother her again. Rocío reveals to Ofelia that Luis is much more dangerous than he seems.
37	"Todo cae por su propio peso"	31 December 2024	N/A
Rocío reveals to Ofelia how she lost everything to Luis and she assures her that she will do everything to find out the truth. Paula decides to listen to Saúl and go to his house to put an end to his threats. Ofelia regrets having taken Mar to the Portilla mansion and imposing that luxurious life as a goal. Ofelia finds a letter from Nicolás to Cecilia in which he questions her motives for sending him to study so far away from home.
38	"¡Mar es mi esposa!"	1 January 2025	N/A
Leonardo and Arturo set a trap for Saúl to make him pay for his crime. Graciela begs Luis to end his marriage to Mar so he can concentrate on his children's problems. Leonardo questions Paula about her motives for showing up at Saúl's house. Nicolás invites Valeria to dinner to celebrate her progress in modeling classes.
39	"Esa señora es de peligro"	2 January 2025	N/A
Nicolás visits Cecilia's grave hoping for some clarity about his love situation. Graciela shares with Luis her fear regarding Ofelia's insatiable curiosity. Mar shows her solidarity with Paula and offers her friendship to deal with her problems. Graciela gives Rocío one more chance to get away from the Portilla family for good.
40	"Mi razón para seguir adelante"	3 January 2025	N/A
Susana asks Camila to help her iron Juan's clothes while she cooks. Ofelia warns Paula not to think for a second that she believed her story that she was assaulted by Saúl. Mar goes for her first ultrasound and discovers her maternal instinct when she hears her baby's heart. Nicolás has a plan to force Valeria and Arturo to tell each other everything they have to say.
41	"Aprovechar el tiempo perdido"	6 January 2025	N/A
42	"La viuda de Portilla"	7 January 2025	N/A
43	"La dueña de esta casa"	8 January 2025	N/A
44	"Hay que respetar a los muertos"	9 January 2025	N/A
45	"El padre de mi hijo es..."	10 January 2025	N/A
46	"Lucharemos por lo nuestro"	13 January 2025	N/A
47	"Una segunda oportunidad"	14 January 2025	N/A
48	"Tengo el alma cansada"	15 January 2025	N/A
49	"Aléjate de mi esposo"	16 January 2025	N/A
50	"Prefiero tu odio"	17 January 2025	N/A
51	"La vida es un regalo"	20 January 2025	N/A
52	"Un hogar lleno de amor"	21 January 2025	N/A
53	"Eres frío y calculador"	22 January 2025	N/A
54	"¡Fuera de mi casa!"	23 January 2025	N/A
55	"Ahora estás sola"	24 January 2025	N/A
56	"No hay dolor que se compare"	27 January 2025	N/A
57	"¿Me quieres volver loca?"	28 January 2025	N/A
58	"Unidas tú y yo"	29 January 2025	N/A
59	"Lo que Ofelia se merece"	30 January 2025	N/A
60	"¿Cómo puedo vivir sin ustedes?"	31 January 2025	N/A
61	"El olvido es como la muerte"	3 February 2025	N/A
62	"¿Por qué me crees tan tonta?"	4 February 2025	N/A
63	"Todo mundo te va a conocer"	5 February 2025	N/A
64	"¡Con la cabeza en alto!"	6 February 2025	N/A
65	"¿Qué le hiciste a mi papá?"	7 February 2025	N/A
66	"Que todo se caiga en pedazos"	10 February 2025	N/A
67	"Nadie se mete con mis hijas"	11 February 2025	N/A
68	"Tienes un embarazo ectópico"	12 February 2025	N/A
69	"Sus secretos los pueden destruir"	13 February 2025	N/A
70	"Tenemos todo en contra"	14 February 2025	N/A
71	"Tú no eres mi mamá"	17 February 2025	N/A
72	"Perdí a mi hijo"	18 February 2025	N/A
73	"Nicolás no te es indiferente"	19 February 2025	N/A
74	"El hombre perfecto"	20 February 2025	N/A
75	"Un amor bonito"	21 February 2025	N/A
76	"Por fin estás acorralada"	24 February 2025	N/A
77	"Acabemos con esta mentira"	25 February 2025	N/A
78	"Necesito saber la verdad"	26 February 2025	N/A
79	"Reconstruir a la familia"	27 February 2025	N/A
80	"Merezco estar sola"	28 February 2025	N/A
81	"Me equivoqué"	2 March 2025	6.74
82	"Vamos a llegar muy lejos"	2 March 2025	6.74

== Reception ==
=== Ratings ===
Viewership and ratings per season of Las hijas de la señora García
Season	Timeslot (CT)	Episodes	First aired		Last aired		Avg. viewers (millions)
Season	Timeslot (CT)	Episodes	Date	Viewers (millions)	Date	Viewers (millions)	Avg. viewers (millions)
1	Mon–Fri 9:30 p.m.	15	11 November 2024	2.09	2 March 2025	6.74	2.22

=== Awards and nominations ===
Year	Award	Category	Nominated	Result	Ref
2025	Produ Awards	Best Family Telenovela	Las hijas de la señora García	Nominated	
2025	Produ Awards	Best Lead Actress - Family Telenovela	Oka Giner	Won	
2025	Produ Awards	Best Lead Actor - Family Telenovela	Emmanuel Palomares	Won	
