= Montserrat Oliver =

Mexican fashion model and business entrepreneur

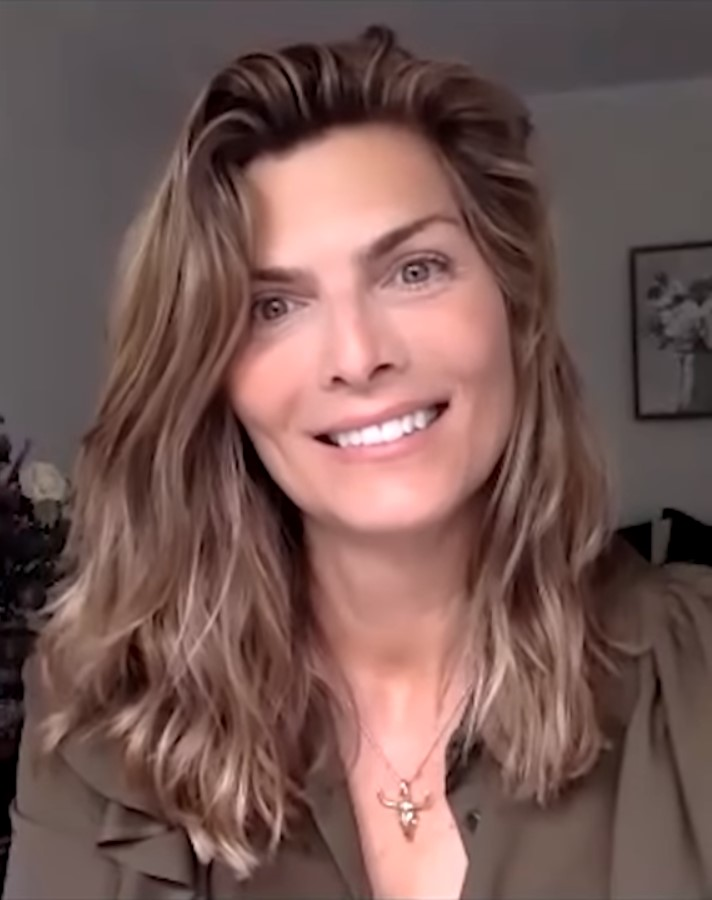
- Oliver in 2020
- Born: Montserrat Lourdes Socorro Oliver Grimau; April 13, 1966 (age 60); Monterrey, Nuevo León, Mexico
- Occupations: Fashion model, business entrepreneur, actress, talk-show host
- Years active: 1982–present
- Height: 5 ft 9 in (1.75 m)
- Spouse: Yaya Kosikova (m. 2020)
- Website: www.montserratoliver.net

Montserrat Oliver (born Montserrat Lourdes Socorro Oliver Grimau on April 13, 1966) is a Mexican fashion model, business entrepreneur, actress, and talk-show host.

== Life and career ==
Oliver started her modeling career at the age of 16. She quickly landed a Vogue cover, a magazine in which she was featured numerous times throughout her professional life.

Her first relevant role was in the early years 90's, in the famous mexican "Brandy Presidente" (a liquor from Pedro Domecq distillery) tv commercial, with a high impact phrase : "obviamente Presidente". This commercial was an important impulse in her modeling career.

Early in her career, Oliver moved to Miami where she modeled for magazines such as Elle and Top Model. While in Miami, she was cast for a role in the Fox series Fortune Hunter. She also hosted the Telemundo show Basta for two years.

After several years in the United States, Montserrat returned to Mexico City where she appeared in Ramona, the first of many telenovelas for the Spanish-language broadcast network Televisa, which included "Sin Pecado Concebido", "Mujeres" and "La Madrastra". After Ramona, Oliver starred in her own Televisa show, "Las Hijas de la Madre Tierra", which she co-produced and co-hosted with close friend Yolanda Andrade. The show aired for eight years in Mexico and in various countries around the world.

During this time, Montserrat also served as national spokesperson and brand image for selected global companies, like Coca-Cola, L’Oréal Paris, and Lancôme among others. She is currently the brand image for Scotia Bank, Trident, and Clear shampoo.

Montserrat continued her relationship with Televisa as the network's live correspondent in historical television specials around the world like the Athens, Beijing and London Olympics in 2004, 2008 and 2012, as well as the Japan, South Africa and Brazil World Cups in 2002, 2010 and 2014 respectively. She has also been called upon to host live award shows as was the case in 1998 when she hosted the prestigious music festival Viña del Mar in Chile and in 2002 when she co-hosted the MTV Video Music Awards Latinoamérica in Miami.

Montserrat co-hosts with Yolanda Andrade the Televisa interview and musical late-night show Mojoe. She is openly lesbian and she is married to Slovak model Yaya Kosikova.

== Business ventures ==
In addition to her high-profile media presence in Mexico, Montserrat Oliver owns several businesses: a clothing line called Royal Closet, Barbara Coppel used to be her business partner; a line of sunglasses called MO Lunettes du Soleil; a talent agency, Jerry ML, which represents artists for commercial work throughout Mexico; and, a production company which specializes in producing commercials.

== Television ==
=== As actress ===
- Palabra de Mujer 2007–2008 (TV series) (Montserrat)
- La Madrastra 2005 (TV series) (Patricia Ibáñez)
- Mujeres 2005 (TV series) (Pamela)
- Gran musical 2003 (TV series)
- Sin pecado concebido 2001 (TV series) (Montserrat España)
- Ramona 2000 (TV series) (Doris)
- Hacer y Desacer 1997 (TV series) (Host)

=== As producer ===
- Las Hijas de la Madre Tierra 2000 (TV series) (Producer)

=== As herself ===
- reto 4 elementos naturaleza extrema (host) (herself) 2018-
- Mojoe Present (TV series) (Host)
- Otro rollo... Historia en diez 2005 (TV movie)
- Otro rollo con: Adal Ramones 2005 (TV series)
- El show de Cristina 2004 (TV series)
- Rebelde 2004 (TV series)
- 100 mexicanos dijeron Televisa Deportes vs Los Comediantes 2004 (TV series)
- Big Brother VIP 3 2004 (TV series)
- Big Brother VIP: México Gran final del Circo de Big Brother VIP and Final 2004/1 y La guerra 2004 (TV series)
- Hoy 2004 (TV series)
- Clase 406 2002 (TV series)
- MTV Video Music Awards Latinoamérica 2002 2002 (TV special) (Presenter)
- Las hijas de la madre tierra 2000 (TV series) (Host)
