= Yadhira Carrillo =

Mexican actress and businesswoman (born 1972)

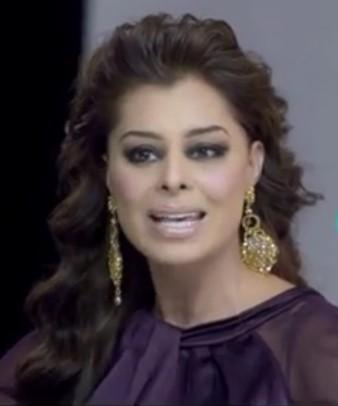
- Carrillo in 2021
- Born: Yadhira Carrillo Villalobos; May 12, 1973 (age 53); Aguascalientes, Mexico
- Occupations: Actress, model, businesswoman, presenter
- Spouses: Michael Kuhn (m. 1999; div. 2002) Juan Collado (m. 2012; div. 2025)
- Beauty pageant titleholder
- Title: Nuestra Belleza Aguascalientes 1994
- Years active: 1994–2008; 2025–present
- Major competitions: Nuestra Belleza Aguascalientes 1994 (Winner); Nuestra Belleza México 1994 (1st Runner-up)

Yadhira Carrillo Villalobos (born May 12, 1973) is a Mexican actress, model and beauty queen.

== Early career ==
Yadhira Carrillo was chosen Nuestra Belleza Aguascalientes in 1994, the state qualifier for the national Nuestra Belleza México, to determine Mexico's contestant for the Miss Universe 1995 competition. Carrillo finished as first-runner-up at the Nuestra Belleza México 1994.

After this, Carrillo entered the Centro de Educación Artística (CEA), planning for a career in performing arts.

== Acting career ==
After a "special appearance" in the telenovela Canción de amor, producer Carla Estrada offered Carrillo the supporting role of Teresa in the telenovela Te Sigo Amando (I still love you). She worked with Estrada again playing Josefina in María Isabel. After appearing in several episodes of Mujer, casos de la vida real, and portraying a villain in the TV-special Mas allá de la Usurpadora, she received her first co-starring role in El Niño que vino del mar (The Boy Who Came From The Sea).

Producer Ernesto Alonso hired Carrillo for the role of the antagonist in El precio de tu amor (The Price of Your Love). This was followed by a duo-role in the 2002 telenovela La Otra (The Other Woman), where she played two characters who are polar opposites; Carlota Guillen, a good natured daughter who is abused, subjugated and manipulated by her mother, and Cordelia Portugal, a manipulative gold digger.

In addition to her career in Mexico, Carrillo debuted abroad with a role in the Spanish telenovela El Secreto (The Secret), in which she plays a perverse ex fiancée of the protagonist, played by fellow Mexican actor Eduardo Capetillo. In 2004 Carrillo was the protagonist in Amarte es mi Pecado (Loving You is My Sin), and also played a special guest star role in Rubí, as Elena Navarro. In 2005 she starred in Barrera de Amor (Barrier of Love).

In March 2025, it was announced that Carrillo would return to acting after 17 years of hiatus, by starring in Los hilos del pasado, playing the role of Carolina Guillén. Carrillo first played the role of Carolina in a cameo appearance in Las hijas de la señora García.

== Personal life ==
She was married to Michael Kuhn. In 2012 she married Juan Collado, ex-husband of Leticia Calderón.

== Filmography ==
=== Film ===
Year	Title	Role	Notes
1998	La Primera Noche	The Cousin	

=== Television ===
Year	Title	Role	Notes
1996	Canción de amor	Margara	Episode: "1.1"
1996	Te sigo amando	Teresa	3 episodes
1997–1998	Maria Isabel	Josefina	3 episodes
1997–2001	Mujer, Casos de la Vida Real	Various roles	Episodes: "Lilia", "Una mirada dulce y desesperada" & "La flor de la vida"
1998–1999	El Privilegio de Amar	María José	40 episodes
1999	Más Alla de la Usurpadora	Raquel Andrea Garcia	
1999	El niño que vino del mar	Magdalena de la Soledad	Main cast
2000	La casa en la playa	Georgina Castro/Salas	4 episodes
2000	El precio de tu amor	Sandra Rangel	Main cast; 95 episodes
2001	El Secreto	Lydia	3 episodes
2001	Navidad sin fin	Toñita	2 episodes
2002	La hora pico	Various roles	Episode: "Invitada Yadhira Carrillo"
2002	La Otra	Carlota Guillén / Cordelia Portugal	Main role
2004	Amarte es mi Pecado	Leonora "Nora" Guzmán Madrigal de Horta	Main role
2004	Rubí	Elena Navarro	Special appearance; 47 episodes
2005–2006	Barrera de amor	María Teresa "Maité" Galván Martínez	Main role
2007	Amor sin maquillaje	Herself	Episode: "Amor Oculto"
2007–2008	Palabra de mujer	Fernanda Ortiz Barquín de Gil	Main role
2025	Las hijas de la señora García	Carolina Guillén	Episode: "Vamos a llegar muy lejos"
2025	Los hilos del pasado	Carolina Guillén	Main role

== Awards and nominations ==
Award	Year (Note: Indicates the year of ceremony. Each year is linked to the article about the awards held that year, wherever possible.)	Recipient(s) and nominee(s)	Category	Result	Ref.
Camino a Premios TVyNovelas	2010	Herself	Trayectory	Won	
El Heraldo de México Awards	2001	El Precio de tu Amor	Female Revelation	Won	
Premios ACPT	2003	Espíritu Travieso	Female Revelation	Won	
Premios INTE	2003	La Otra	Actress Of The Year	Nominated	
Premios Juventud	2004	Herself	Actress Who Steals The Screen	Won	
Premio Nacional de la Mujer	2011	Herself	Women Award	Won	
Premios TVyNovelas	2001	El Precio de tu Amor	Best Female Antagonist	Nominated	
Premios TVyNovelas	2001	El Precio de tu Amor	Best Co-star Actress	Nominated	
Premios TVyNovelas	2003	La Otra	Best Lead Actress	Won	
Premios TVyNovelas	2004	Amarte es mi Pecado	Best Lead Actress	Nominated	

== Notes ==
Awards and achievements
Preceded by -	Nuestra Belleza Aguascalientes; 1994	Succeeded by Leticía Soria Mereles
