= Mendoza del Valle del Momboy =

- Coordinates: 9.1822°N 70.6808°W

Mendoza del Valle del Momboy is a parish in Valera Municipality, Trujillo State, Venezuela.
