= Valera Municipality =

Valera Municipio Valera
- Municipality
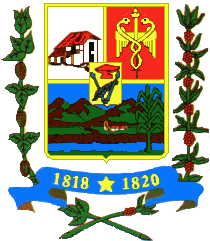
- Flag Seal

- Location of Valera Municipality within the state of Trujillo
- Country: Venezuela
- State: Trujillo

Government
  - Mayor: Alfredy Moreno Silva (PSUV)

Area
  - Total: 240 km^{2} (93 sq mi)

Population (2011)
  - Total: 250,000
  - Density: 1,000/km^{2} (2,700/sq mi)
- Demonym: Valerano
- Time zone: UTC−4 (VET)
- Website: www.municipiovalera.gov.ve

Valera is one of the twenty municipalities in the Venezuelan state of Trujillo. Its capital is the city of Valera. In the 2011 census, its population was 250,000. It has an area of 240 km^{2} (93 sq mi), giving it a population density of 567.2 inhabitants per km².

The municipality contains six parishes, Juan Ignacio Montilla, La Beatriz, La Puerta, Mendoza del Valle del Momboy, Mercedes Díaz and San Luis.
