= El precio de tu amor =

Mexican telenovela

- Directed by: Claudio Reyes Rubio
- Starring: Eduardo Santamarina; Eugenia Cauduro; Yadhira Carrillo; Manuel Ojeda; Roberto Ballesteros; Macaria
- Opening theme: "El precio de tu amor" by José Cantoral
- Country of origin: Mexico
- Original language: Spanish
- No. of episodes: 95

Production
- Executive producer: Ernesto Alonso

Original release
- Network: Canal de las Estrellas
- Release: September 4, 2000 – January 12, 2001

Related
- Al rojo vivo (1980-1981)

El precio de tu amor (The Price of Your Love), is a Mexican telenovela produced by Ernesto Alonso for Televisa in 2000. Eduardo Santamarina and Eugenia Cauduro as the protagonists, while Yadhira Carrillo star as the antagonists.

== Plot ==
Antonio Ríos is a mechanical Noble who has just inherited a fortune, but Sandra's niece who gave inheritance conquer try to take his inheritance from his uncle, Gabriela secretary accompanies Sandra, she and Antonio are in love but Sandra wonder the price his Love

== Cast ==
- Eugenia Cauduro as Gabriela Galván
- Eduardo Santamarina as Antonio Ríos
- Yadhira Carrillo as Sandra Rangel
- Manuel Ojeda as Octavio Rangel
- Roberto Ballesteros as Rodolfo Galván
- Macaria as Adelina
- Ninón Sevilla as Dalila
- Galilea Montijo as Valeria Ríos
- Alejandro Ávila as Guillermo San Miguel
- Samuel Gallegos as Plutarco
- Yolanda Ciani as Isabel
- Emilia Carranza as Yolanda
- Mariana Botas as Mary Ríos
- Rodrigo Rochet as Alejandro
- David Ramos as Carmelo
- Fernando Robles as Trinidad
- Lourdes Dechamps as Lolita
- Virginia Gimeno as La Chata
- Raquel Pankowsky as Meche
- María Prado as Doña Licha
- Carlos Yustis as Policarpo
- Jaime Lozano as Don Benigno
