= Herederos por accidente =

Mexican web television series

- Genre: Comedy drama
- Created by: Frank Ariza
- Directed by: Fernando Urdapilleta; Laura Marco
- Starring: Consuelo Duval; Maite Perroni; Cuca Escribano
- Country of origin: Mexico
- Original language: Spanish
- No. of seasons: 2
- No. of episodes: 26

Original release
- Network: Claro Video
- Release: 3 April – 27 October 2020

Herederos por accidente is a Mexican comedy-drama web television series created by Frank Ariza. The series has 2 seasons, each one with 13 episodes. All episodes of the series became available for streaming on Claro Video on 3 April 2020. The series stars Consuelo Duval, Maite Perroni, and Cuca Escribano.

== Cast ==
- Consuelo Duval
- Maite Perroni as Lu
- Michel Duval as Marco
- Jorge Caballero as Alex
- Camila Valero as Mafer
- Cuca Escribano as Rosa
- Luis Miguel Seguí as Diego
- Manuel Vera as Martín
- Horacio Colomé as Robert
- Xavier Cervantes as Don José Márquez de Guevara
- Alberto Collado as Jacinto
- Mara López as Carlota
- Carmen Muga as Rocío
- Norma Angélica as Amanda
- Álvaro Fontalba as Borja
- Sara Montalvo as Mercedes
- Walter Kapelas as Ambrosio
- Diego Luque as Manolito "El Tigre"

== Synopsis ==
After Don José's supposedly accidental death, a Mexican and a Spanish family end up fighting over his inheritance. The baby Lupe is expecting is the heir to this whole fortune. However, the two families hide great secrets.

== Season 1 ==
Season 1
Episode	Title
Episode 1	Dos entierros y un embarazo
Episode 2	Todos tenemos un secreto
Episode 3	Hermanos, flores y besos
Episode 4	Ahorita
Episode 5	Yo me case de blanco
Episode 6	Policías y ladrones
Episode 7	La vida es sueño
Episode 8	La última voluntad
Episode 9	Peligro de muerte
Episode 10	Entre gemelos anda el juego
Episode 11	La invasión
Episode 12	Un papel y una firma
Episode 13	Carrera de bebés

== Season 2 ==
Season 2
Episode	Title
Episódio 1	Que no cese la pachanga
Episode 2	Encuentros y desencuentros
Episode 3	Mentiras y firmas
Episode 4	Don Diego pierde el juicio
Episode 5	La boda del siglo
Episode 6	Sustos, sobresaltos y alguna despedida
Episode 7	Un bautizo de fuego
Episode 8	Dobles parejas
Episode 9	Pasiones desatadas
Episode 10	Operación espía
Episode 11	Buscando y desordenando
Episode 12	Volando voy
Episode 13	Los ángeles exterminadores
