= Hotel todo incluido =

- Genre: Fantasy; Romantic comedy
- Created by: Adriana Pelusi; Jorge Aragón
- Based on: Infelices para siempre by Miguel García Moreno and Adriana Pelusi
- Written by: Adriana Pelusi
- Directed by: Pitibol Ybarra
- Starring: José Eduardo Derbez; Sofía Castro; Consuelo Duval
- Composer: Pablo Borghi
- Country of origin: Mexico
- Original language: Spanish
- No. of seasons: 1
- No. of episodes: 16

Production
- Executive producers: José María Irisarri; Iñaki Gómez; Santiago de la Rica; Gonzalo Sagardía; Abraham Mancilla; Jorge Aragón
- Cinematography: Víctor Entrecanales
- Camera setup: Multi-camera
- Production company: Onza Américas

Original release
- Network: Vix
- Release: 28 August 2026

Hotel todo incluido is a Mexican romantic comedy television series based on the 2023 film Infelices para siempre. The series stars José Eduardo Derbez, Sofía Castro and Consuelo Duval. It premiered on Vix on 28 August 2026.

== Cast ==
=== Main ===
- José Eduardo Derbez as Sebastián Martínez
- Sofía Castro as Marcela
- Consuelo Duval as María José Márquez

=== Recurring and guest stars ===
- Harold Azuara as Dr. Cástulo Fernández
- Javier Ibarreche as Ángel
- Mónica del Carmen as Tere
- Joel Cederberg as Sven
- Daniel Bello as Carlos
- Mauricio Garza as Bruno Reyes Retana
- Ricardo Fastlicht as Alfredo García
- Ximena Lecuona as Nina
- Ofelia Medina as Laura Robles Torres
  - Yare Santana as young Laura
- Cynthia Klitbo
- Luz Aldan as Cindy
- Nicola Porcella as Paulo
- Michael Ronda as Manuel
- Mario Bezares

== Production ==
On 5 November 2025, it was announced that Vix was producing a series based on the 2023 film Infelices para siempre. José Eduardo Derbez and Sofía Castro were cast in the lead roles. Consuelo Duval reprises her role of María José. Ricardo Fastlicht took over the role of Alfredo from Adrián Uribe. Additionally, Ximena Lecuona replaced Isabella Vázquez in the role of Nina. Filming took place in Bilbao, Spain. On 1 July 2026, Hotel todo incluido was announced as the series title.
