= El maleficio (2023 TV series) =

- Genre: Telenovela
- Based on: El maleficio by Fernanda Villeli
- Developed by: José Alberto Castro; Vanessa Varela; Patricio Saiz; Fernando Garcilita
- Directed by: Salvador Garcini; Fez Noriega
- Starring: Fernando Colunga; Marlene Favela; Julián Gil
- Theme music composer: Roberto Sánchez Bustos
- Opening theme: "Bael"
- Composers: Armando López; Berenice González; Osvaldo García
- Country of origin: Mexico
- Original language: Spanish
- No. of seasons: 1
- No. of episodes: 82

Production
- Executive producer: José Alberto Castro
- Producers: Ernesto Hernández; Fausto Sainz
- Editors: Juan Ordóñez; Héctor Flores; Arturo Rodríguez
- Production company: TelevisaUnivision

Original release
- Network: Las Estrellas
- Release: 13 November 2023 – 3 March 2024

El maleficio (English: The Curse) is a Mexican telenovela produced by José Alberto Castro for TelevisaUnivision. It is based on the 1983 telenovela of the same name created by Fernanda Villeli. The series aired on Las Estrellas from 13 November 2023 to 3 March 2024. It stars Fernando Colunga and Marlene Favela.

== Plot ==
Enrique de Martino is a successful and mysterious businessman whose greatness is surrounded by a dark and well-kept secret. In contrast is Beatriz Almazán, a woman with a generous heart and dedicated to her family. Enrique and Beatriz's paths intertwine and love emerges, which throws Enrique's plans into disarray. Enrique worships the demon Bael, and he believes that Beatriz and her family are the key to ensuring Bael's continuity.

== Cast ==
- Fernando Colunga as Enrique de Martino
- Marlene Favela as Beatriz Almazán
- Julián Gil as Gerardo
- Jacqueline Andere as Nuria Montes
- Sofía Castro as Vicky Montes
- Alejandro Calva as Cayetano
- Alejandro Ávila as Joel
- Adrián Di Monte as Jorge de Martino
- Verónica Montes as Julia Peralta
- Jessica Coch as Diana
- Julio Vallado as Raúl de Martino
- Markín López as El Capitán
- Pedro de Tavira as Eduardo
- Mario Loria as Adrián
- Jaume Mateu as Fernando
- Kaled Acab as Juanito Montes
- Jesús Carus as Carlos
- Katia Bada as Ruth
- Nicole Curiel as Clara
- Michelle Durán as Roberta
- Mark Tacher as Álvaro
- Rafael Inclán as Darío
- Ana Belena as Nora Alarcón
- Sergio Basáñez
- Eugenio Cobo as Cardinal Mondragón
- Chantal Andere as Dolores
- Marcia Coutiño as Marcia
- Karla Cossio as Lucía
- Gerardo Murguía as Cardinal Neri
- Sergio Goyri as Humberto Zamora

== Production ==
=== Development ===
In October 2018, it was announced that Televisa would produce a reboot of the 1983 telenovela El maleficio, as part of the Fábrica de sueños franchise. On 4 January 2023, José Alberto Castro was announced as executive producer of the reboot. Filming of the series began in July 2023.

=== Casting ===
On 21 July 2023, Fernando Colunga and Marlene Favela were announced in the lead roles, alongside Jacqueline Andere, who played main character Beatriz de Martino in the original series. On 24 July 2023, Rafael Inclán, Sergio Basáñez, Sofía Castro, Julio Vallado and Kaled Acab were announced as part of the cast. On 3 August 2023, it was announced that Mark Tacher had joined the cast. On 4 August 2023, it was announced Julián Gil has joined the cast. An extensive cast list was published by People en Español on 21 September 2023.

== Episodes ==
No.	Title	Original release date	Mexico viewers (millions)
1	"Soy Enrique de Martino"	13 November 2023 (Note: Premiered early online through Las Estrellas website on 10 November 2023.)	2.7
Gerardo steals several valuable artifacts from a house in ruins and when he leaves, the same man in the painting warns him that the objects could bring an evil spell. Enrique arrives home and confirms that his children have preferred to lock themselves in their room instead of spending time with him and he is fed up with the loneliness. Raúl tells Enrique that the only thing he could give him to improve their relationship is an explanation about his mother's death. Juanito gets lost in Enrique's family crypt and when Enrique returns him to his mother, he is impressed by Beatriz's beauty.
2	"No he dejado de pensar en ti, Beatriz"	14 November 2023	2.6
Seeing Raúl's desire to reconnect with his father, Jorge advises him to attend Enrique's organization meetings and become more involved with the attendees. Gerardo asks Enrique to involve his sons more to maintain the legacy in the organization, but Enrique makes it clear that he has sacrificed more than anyone else. As Juanito searches for his cat, he is stalked by a specter that turns into a snake; Nuria warns Beatriz about her son's imagination. Enrique decides to send Beatriz a bouquet of flowers to show his interest in her.
3	"Estoy dispuesto a todo, Beatriz"	15 November 2023	2.7
Gerardo explains to Enrique how important it is for his two sons to get involved in the organization so that one of them can inherit the power he carries inside. Álvaro tries to approach Juanito offering his friendship and looking for a mutual interest in order to have something more serious with Beatriz. Vicky finds an opportunity to get closer to Jorge, but quickly becomes disillusioned with him when she has to deal with Ruth, his girlfriend. Álvaro proposes to Beatriz to formalize their relationship and asks her to live together.
4	"Me encargaré de que Beatriz no me pueda olvidar"	16 November 2023	2.4
Gerardo explains to Capitán how Enrique will find the right person to whom he will give his power. Capitán finds the man responsible for putting the organization at risk by leaking confidential information. Vicky and Juanito suffer in their own way the loss of their father, as they still can't get over it. Enrique surprises Beatriz when she arrives home and she shares her fears and the strength her children give her.
5	"No puede pasar nada entre nosotros, Enrique"	17 November 2023	2.1
Beatriz tries to put a stop to Enrique's interest but he warns her that he will not give up easily. Beatriz confesses to Álvaro about Enrique's visit and he claims tells her that he has known him for a long time. Gerardo warns Enrique that maybe the reason why some business deals have gone bad for him is that his successor will soon show up. Jorge remembers that Raúl was not so introverted as a child and Enrique explains that he witnessed his mother's death.
6	"Bael todo el tiempo nos observa"	20 November 2023	2.3
Seeing the success and following Jorge's advice, Raúl decides to give the organization's meetings a chance. After discovering his betrayal, Enrique takes Guillermo out of the organization but not before imposing a punishment on him. Vicky is left outside of the club because she is late, but she meets Raúl, who remembers seeing her from the cemetery and offers his company. Juanito has another dream where he sees Bael and when he wakes up, he asks Beatriz to look for Enrique.
7	"No veo en Raúl lo mismo que en ti"	21 November 2023	2.0
Enrique recognizes Raúl's effort in public speaking, but demands that he step out of his comfort zone to reach the high standards of the De Martino family name. Unaware that it is Beatriz, Álvaro's boss demands that he fire the person responsible for the loss of an important client. Beatriz learns that her boss has asked for her termination, but Álvaro assures that he is willing to do anything to avoid it, including resigning. Enrique visits Beatriz and when she tries to stop him from looking for her, he explains that his visit is for Juanito.
8	"Acéptame una invitación a cenar, Beatriz"	22 November 2023	2.4
Enrique asks Beatriz to consider a date with him, assuring her that he will take her to her favorite place and if not, he will not look for her again. Juanito brings the album that Enrique gave him to school and quickly attracts the attention of his classmates, making them become his friends. Jorge takes Raúl to a bar and thanks to Ruth's help, he gets him a friend with whom he can spend time. Enrique surprises Beatriz by fulfilling his bet to take her to dinner at her favorite place.
9	"Me da miedo Enrique de Martino"	23 November 2023	2.3
Beatriz thanks Enrique for their date. Beatriz confesses to Nuria that she is afraid of falling in love with Enrique. Jorge is reunited with Mónica, an old friend, which makes Ruth feel displaced in her boyfriend's heart. In his dreams, Raúl recalls one of his last memories with his mother where she rejects him while running away from someone.
10	"No hay nada más fuerte que el poder de Bael"	24 November 2023	2.3
Enrique hears Raúl's dream about his mother and fears that he has remembered everything about the day she died. Despite the news of the new investors, Beatriz is fired for losing an important client. Enrique feels free of Bael's influence for the first time and Gerardo warns him that the succession of power may be closer than he thinks. Raúl searches the house for his mother's belongings and becomes obsessed with finding answers to her death.
11	"La suerte se le está terminando a Álvaro"	27 November 2023	2.4
Joel is determined to get the organization's support so he gives Gerardo the sentence that accuses him of fraud and the latter seeks to use the information in his favor. Thinking he is Enrique de Martino, Juanito interrupts the conversation between Nuria and Álvaro and confesses all the details about the dinner that Enrique offered at his house. Beatriz arrives with Álvaro at the SegurVida event to ask for another chance to get her job back, but both are surprised to learn that Enrique is the new owner of the company. After being named the new owner, Enrique approaches Beatriz's table to greet her and learns that she has been fired. He immediately gives her her place and invites her to his table, despite Álvaro's jealousy.
12	"Enrique es un ángel en tu vida"	28 November 2023	2.4
After another disturbing nightmare, Raúl wakes up to find the picture frame with his mother's image on the floor. Gerardo meets with Dr. Valdez to explain Raúl's case and instructs him to keep him informed so that it does not have repercussions on the organization. After being counseled by his father and brother, Raúl goes to therapy where he comes clean about the nightmares and sudden flashbacks he has been having. Juanito faces an out-of-the-ordinary situation, while Enrique dreams about him and his possible successor.
13	"Puedo ser mejor que Enrique de Martino"	29 November 2023	2.0
Enrique asks for a sign to know why Juanito manifested in his vision and calls Gerardo to try to find the answer. After having passed the test of trust, Gerardo summons Joel to welcome him to the organization and takes the opportunity to ask him about Adrián. Tired of Álvaro's jealous rantings, Beatriz again makes it clear that there is nothing more between her and Enrique and decides to put an end to their relationship. Jorge disagrees that his brother should be considered to lead the organization and makes it clear to Gerardo that he is willing to do anything to succeed his father.
14	"No tienes permitido ser débil, Raúl"	30 November 2023	2.4
Under pressure to meet the deadline, Raul has a paranormal experience at a manifestation on his computer. Enrique surprises Beatriz with a date showing her the city and confesses how much he is attracted to her. Enrique is tired of Raul's weakness and with Bael's power, he puts him in his place. After Enrique shares his concern for his sons, Gerardo makes it clear that there are priorities and that he cannot develop any affection.
15	"Entenderé si no quieres volverme a ver"	1 December 2023	2.4
Enrique makes Juanito's day when he takes him to the Estadio Azteca to celebrate with his friends. Beatriz shows her appreciation. After thanking him for the birthday gift, Juanito tells Enrique how worried he is about his mother. Raúl tells Gerardo about what he discovered and Gerardo questions him about his concerns. After confessing that it is about his mother, Gerardo tells Raúl that it is time to release his memories. Beatriz talks to Enrique and agrees to have more outings with him. Gerardo again warns Enrique that he should be more patient with Raúl.
16	"Yo quiero ser como tú, Enrique de Martino"	4 December 2023	2.1
Enrique confronts Jorge and confirms that his son does not have the capacity to lead the organization. Beatriz gets tired of Álvaro's jealousy and decides to end their relationship, he warns her that he will show her that Enrique is not the man he seems to be. Beatriz confesses to Nuria that she broke up with Álvaro, she is happy to hear about her niece's decision. Gerardo takes Raúl to the house where his mother died and he relives the moment of her death.
17	"Renovar la fe en Bael"	5 December 2023	2.0
Gerardo encourages Raúl to discover his father's secret and advises him to do whatever Enrique tells him to do. Enrique interferes in his sons' fight, Raúl confronts him for hiding the truth about his mother's death. Raúl begs his father to let him join the organization, Enrique accepts, but makes it clear that he will not allow deception. Raúl returns to the organization and in front of everyone, he promises to always be part of it.
18	"Estoy lista para nuestro destino, Enrique"	6 December 2023	2.0
Jorge is jealous of Enrique's attention to Raúl and questions him about his sudden interest in the organization. Ruth complains to Jorge for taking Mónica to his house instead of her and compares herself to his mother, as she feels she is also going crazy. Beatriz confesses to Enrique that she has begun to fall in love with him and is ready to see what fate has in store for them. Álvaro assures Beatriz that her relationship with Enrique will not last long, assuring her that they are too different people.
19	"Cuando Bael se manifiesta, lo hace contundente"	7 December 2023	2.2
Gerardo tries to set Jorge and Raúl against each other by assuring Jorge that Raúl intends to replace him in the company. Beatriz shares with Vicky that if she wants a lasting relationship with Enrique, she must show herself as she is. During dinner at Beatriz's house, Enrique senses Bael's presence as he sits next to Juanito and sees it as a sign. After his date with Beatriz, Enrique arranges to transfer Álvaro to Monterrey to keep him away from her.
20	"La vida de Eduardo ya no será igual"	8 December 2023	2.3
Vicky's friends convince her to solve a stolen exam, the coordinator discovers her and puts her academic future at risk. Beatriz fears Enrique is behind her sudden promotion at work and believes it is a way to buy her affection. Beatriz meets Julia, her rival for Enrique's love, but does not allow herself to be so easily intimidated. Seeing how glamorous Enrique's event is, Beatriz considers canceling their date so as not to embarrass him.
21	"Este beso es como una obra de arte"	11 December 2023	2.4
Enrique demands Jorge to change his attitude towards Raúl, but he remains suspicious of his brother. Enrique sends Beatriz a group of experts to fix her so that she can impress all his guests at the gala. Julia tries to mock Beatriz, but Beatriz defends herself. During their private tour of the gallery, Enrique appeases Beatriz's jealousy with their first kiss.
22	"¿Quién es Bael?"	12 December 2023	2.2
Jorge demands that Raúl explain his sudden interest in the company and the organization in exchange, he will keep quiet about his visits to the old apartment. Álvaro insinuates that Beatriz is with Enrique out of interest and she slaps him. In his visit with Nora's psychologist, Raúl discovers that Bael tormented his mother to death. Enrique and Beatriz face the reporters and confess their love for each other.
23	"El amor es una blasfemia para Bael"	13 December 2023	2.4
Julia is jealous when she discovers that Enrique's relationship with Beatriz is more serious than she thought. Raúl suspects that Jorge is behind the disappearance of his mother's psychologist and complains to him for having betrayed his trust. Gerardo calls Enrique out for talking about love with Beatriz, as he assures him that he is breaking the pact he made with Bael. Upon learning of the pain Juanito is suffering at school, Enrique offers his help to deal with the problem and put an end to it once and for all.
24	"Entregar el alma a las fauces de Bael"	14 December 2023	1.9
Enrique talks to his children about his relationship with Beatriz, but Raúl interrupts him, making his position on a stepmother clear. Enrique and Beatriz agree to take their respective children out to dinner so they can get to know each other and begin to unite the families. Raúl infiltrates Enrique's office and discovers who is the force that haunted Nora in her last days. Beatriz's necklace causes Raúl to remember more about Nora's last days and he realizes that his father is Bael's chosen one.
25	"Pagarás por ofender a Bael"	15 December 2023	2.0
Raúl confronts Enrique for sacrificing his mother in exchange for power and Bael seizes Enrique to finish off his son. Capitán warns Enrique that there is a possibility that Raúl may not have survived the accident. Enrique calls Bael out for attacking Raúl and scorns him for breaking the pact not to harm his children. Capitán informs Enrique that Raúl's body was not found in the accident, so there is a possibility that he may have survived.
26	"No volveré a contactar a Bael"	18 December 2023	2.1
Jorge searches for Raúl in the old apartment they had, but upon recognizing his disappearance, he prays for his brother to be found well. Capitán informs Enrique that one of the city's cameras shows a clue to Raúl's location. Beatriz wakes up in the middle of the night and upon checking her children's rooms, she discovers a strange presence in Juanito's room, unaware that it is Enrique's ex-wife. Enrique explains to Beatriz the argument between him and Raúl and warns her about a dark side he is trying to protect her from.
27	"Contigo puedo cruzar el infierno, Beatriz"	19 December 2023	N/A
Gerardo reminds Enrique that Bael should be the most important thing in his life and offers him the possibility of integrating Beatriz into the organization if he wants to be with her. Gerardo asks for Julia's help to prevent Enrique from putting the organization at risk. Raúl seeks refuge so that Bael does not harm him and finds support from Father Cayetano. Beatriz visits Enrique, but is surprised to see that he is busy with Julia.
28	"Lo único que puede salvar a Enrique es el amor"	20 December 2023	N/A
Raúl wishes Father Cayetano to save Enrique from the torments that await him with Bael. Gerardo pressures Enrique to instruct Jorge about the company and the organization, as he is sure that Bael will choose him as his successor. Beatriz confesses to Enrique that she was jealous seeing him with Julia and asks to be the only woman in his life. Raúl makes sure Enrique stops the search he ordered to prevent him from hurting innocent people.
29	"Somos los hijos de Bael"	21 December 2023	N/A
Gerardo takes Jorge to Enrique's private room, where he shows him everything that Bael has done to improve the lives of the members of the organization. Jorge asks Gerardo to prepare him to become Enrique's successor and thus have Bael's power. Enrique dreams of Juanito in the organization. Beatriz is disappointed in Enrique when she discovers that the flower arrangement he sent her was really for Julia.
30	"No me busques más, Enrique"	22 December 2023	N/A
Raúl comments with Father Cayetano about Jorge and his interest in saving him from darkness. Enrique looks for Beatriz in the office and she confronts him for cheating on her, provoking Bael's fury. Beatriz regrets her breakup with Enrique and believes she has lost him forever. Jorge begins his apprenticeship on Bael's teachings and Gerardo assures him that he will make him his best carrier.
31	"Tengo que estar cerca de Juanito"	25 December 2023	N/A
Upset by the end of Beatriz's relationship with Enrique, Vicky blames her for the breakup and after a strong exchange of words, she assures her that she hates her. While getting ready for bed, Juanito discovers a strange message on the bathroom mirror that frightens him. In confidence with Diana, Beatriz confides that she and her family resent having separated from Enrique and that the guilt is beginning to wear her down. Faced with the obstacles in setting up a construction project, Enrique decides to take matters into his own hands. After coming into contact with Bael, Enrique unleashes a fire where Ávalos, a politician and also his enemy, is trapped.
32	"Debe haber una forma de acabar con Bael"	26 December 2023	N/A
Gerardo assures Jorge that Bael's favors are unlimited, so he can live with many privileges. Enrique assures Beatriz that he loves her, so he promises never to hurt her. Juanito confesses to Vicky that it was him who asked Enrique to look for his mother. Vicky accompanies her aunt Nuria to the church and there she sees Raúl again, she greets him gladly, but Father Cayetano prevents them from continuing their conversation. Enrique arrives at Father Cayetano's church with the intention of entering, but when he tries to knock there is something that prevents him and he leaves the place.
33	"Todos somos esclavos de Bael"	27 December 2023	N/A
Enrique takes Beatriz to a hotel to show her that she is the woman of his life, so they both get carried away by passion. Juanito discovers another message in his notebook, the teacher believes that the classmates who are bothering him wrote it, but he tries to defend them. Gerardo confesses to Capitán that he discovered that Enrique is working behind his back and that bothers him, since he is not in control of anything. Gerardo summons Jorge to his business center to teach him how to please his clients so that they will believe that he has the ability to make their desires and fantasies come true.
34	"El sucesor es uno de tus hijos"	28 December 2023	N/A
Enrique asks for Bael's help to find Raul, but he finds Juanito in his vision and he wakes up tired from the dream he had. Enrique visits Juanito when he finds out he is sick and between dreams, he calls him dad. Bael uses Enrique to get closer to Juanito in order to heal him. Bael fulfills Enrique's request and shows him that he has chosen his new successor.
35	"La tentación tiene muchos rostros"	29 December 2023	N/A
Beatriz confronts the mothers of the classmates who bother Juanito and puts them in their place. Enrique feels ready to take a step forward in his relationship with Beatriz and proposes moving in together. Gerardo takes advantage of a business dinner and teaches Jorge how to take advantage of Bael's power to gain people's trust. Juanito is horrified when he sees for the first time the face of the entity that has manifested itself before him.
36	"La voluntad de Bael"	1 January 2024	N/A
Beatriz worries that Juanito's fear is real, remembering that days before, she also thought she saw the silhouette of a woman in her son's bedroom. Bael answers Gerardo's pleas by showing Jorge and Juanito competing for the place of the successor. Gerardo asks Enrique to stay close to Beatriz in order to gain control over Juanito and thus, fulfill Bael's will. Vicky accompanies Nuria to church and upon seeing Raúl again, she confronts him for having lied to her about who he really is.
37	"Beatriz ¿quieres casarte conmigo?"	2 January 2024	N/A
On Enrique's orders, Jorge seeks out Vicky so he can get to know her better; she sees it as an opportunity to make him fall in love. Enrique plans a romantic and unforgettable trip to New York for Beatriz. The ambassador is willing to pay any price necessary to become president and does not hesitate to ask for Enrique's help. Enrique takes Beatriz to the highest point of New York to ask her to be his wife.
38	"Bael es más poderoso que nunca"	3 January 2024	2.2
Enrique is unable to talk about his past with Beatriz and proves it by not being able to say Nora's name. Jorge reveals the type of women he is attracted to, which coincidentally describes Vicky perfectly. Vicky scares Leo the cat out of Juanito's room but Bael keeps a close eye on him. Accidentally, the ambassador mentions Enrique's organization in front of Beatriz and gets her attention, revealing one of Enrique's many mysteries.
39	"El mundo en nuestras manos"	4 January 2024	2.3
Adrián is rewarded with a huge contract thanks to his first contribution to the organization. Carlos is given everything to manage the finances of the De Martino Tower and decides to take a share for his own benefit and steal Ruth's love. The New York businessmen commemorate their alliance with the De Martino company with a shocking welcome display. Jorge lets out a confession of how attractive he finds Vicky.
40	"Hay miles de mujeres atrás de Enrique"	5 January 2024	2.1
Julia investigates what Enrique's true interest is with Beatriz but getting no answers, she fears that their relationship will destabilize the organization. Enrique invokes the power of Bael to make Dr. Sixto learn what can happen if he does not fulfill his pact. Nuria pressures Beatriz to become more involved in Enrique's world and business to keep him away from other women who desire him. Julia intimidates Beatriz to convince her to leave Enrique.
41	"Juanito, serás como mi hijo"	8 January 2024	2.4
Juanito begins to realize the power he has when he confronts his classmates. Gerardo assures Enrique that the services he has rendered to Bael will soon be rewarded with the life he has always dreamed of. Enrique knows the importance of Juanito's education and proposes to Beatriz to enroll him in the best school, what she doesn't know is that it is part of the organization's plan. Father Cayetano learns of Enrique's wickedness and does not hesitate to warn Nuria about the danger to her niece's family.
42	"Profanar el nombre de Bael"	9 January 2024	2.8
Thanks to Father Cayetano, Nuria learns that Enrique de Martino belongs to an organization that worships a demon and that his intentions with Beatriz are not good, so she decides to confront him. After convincing Nuria that everything Father Cayetano told her is a lie, Enrique orders for her to be followed to find out the identity of the priest who knows his secret. Julia is not willing to let Enrique marry Beatriz, and shows up at his office to seduce him.
43	"Nadie puede controlar el poder de Bael"	10 January 2024	2.7
Enrique doesn't allow himself to be seduced by Julia and makes it clear to her that it is Bael's will to marry Beatriz and he is not willing to contradict him. Juanito is more aware of how powerful he is and decides to take revenge on his classmates by causing an accident. Father Cayetano doesn't want more people to worship Bael and seeks help from the church. Beatriz sees the face of the deceased Nora while trying on her wedding dress.
44	"Sentirás el poder de Bael"	11 January 2024	2.6
Faced with the idea of Jorge being Bael's new successor, Enrique denies Gerardo the opportunity to guide him. After Gerardo's indoctrination and Enrique's acceptance, Jorge takes his oath before Bael. Juanito arrives at his new school where the principal welcomes him and assures him that his classmates will protect him. Beatriz and her family move into Enrique's house, and Vicky finds out that Raúl is Enrique's son.
45	"Bael solo tortura almas"	12 January 2024	2.7
While Juanito looks for his bedroom in Enrique's house, Nora's spirit continues to follow him. Jorge manages to find the church where Raúl works and is determined to convince him to return home. Seeing that Jorge has already entered into communion with Bael, Raúl prays to save his brother's soul. Father Cayetano confronts Enrique to prevent him from taking Raúl from the church and putting him in danger.
46	"La noche que atacó Bael"	15 January 2024	2.8
Raúl refuses to obey Enrique's orders, provoking Bael's anger, but Father Cayetano's faith saves them from the demon. Enrique orders an attack against Father Cayetano's church, who is horrified to see the demon at his door. Enrique is astonished to see that Bael was unable to destroy the church. Raúl returns home to convince Enrique to stop Bael's succession to Jorge.
47	"Los declaro marido y mujer"	16 January 2024	2.7
Gerardo requests the support of the Cardinal, who is also a member of the organization, to take care of the problem represented by Father Cayetano. Enrique and Beatriz get married accompanied by their friends and loved ones. Enrique shows Nuria that he is willing to support her in whatever she needs in order to see Beatriz happy. Enrique and Beatriz consummate their marriage in a romantic evening.
48	"El mundo entero estará a los pies de Bael"	17 January 2024	2.7
Thanks to Beatriz's wedding, Father Cayetano discovers that Enrique's organization is made up of extremely powerful people. Beatriz discovers that Juanito's notebooks are damaged and fears that her son will have problems at his new school. The Cardinal asks the Archbishop to keep him informed of Father Cayetano's concerns so that he can take charge and guide him personally. Juanito tries to catch his cat in his new home, but when he reaches the library, he hears Bael's voice.
49	"¡El sucesor es Juanito!"	18 January 2024	2.6
Bael again makes contact with Juanito, identifying himself as someone who can give him everything he desires. Bael surprises Eduardo by appearing before his eyes and inside the same church he thought he had protected. While Beatriz is in the shower, Nora decides to send her proof that she is with her and her family. Enrique contacts Bael and he shows him irrefutable proof that Juanito will be his next carrier.
50	"Deja a Juanito en paz, Bael"	19 January 2024	2.0
Enrique warns Gerardo all about his vision, but despite Bael's warning, he omits an important detail about the succession. Thomas gives his own daughter to the organization on a night dedicated to lust. Gerardo suspects that Enrique lied to him about Bael's will, as Jorge's attitude proves otherwise.
51	"Salvar sus almas de Bael"	22 January 2024	2.4
Dolores lets Juanito see that there is a reason why he has been standing out above his new classmates. Gerardo assures Enrique that Raúl has been able to develop his power of leadership since he began living in the church. Julia tries to advise Beatriz about her upcoming trip with Enrique and assures her that there is no place she hasn't visited with her husband.
52	"Soy el único digno del poder de Bael"	23 January 2024	2.5
Beatriz puts a stop to Julia's teasing by making clear the big difference between the two of them. Gerardo questions Bael's decisions for choosing Enrique as his bearer and not him. Helen demonstrates that she hates Thomas for giving her to Bael as an offering. Bael takes the form of his first bearer to hold Enrique accountable for his actions.
53	"Nada ni nadie te puede salvar de Bael"	24 January 2024	2.6
Bael points out to Enrique that he is breaking his pact by being in love with Beatriz and warns him that if he wishes, he could take everything away from him. Juanito notices that Gerardo is wearing the same gold bracelet as Enrique and by touching it, he shows him that Bael's power flows within him. Enrique confesses to Beatriz that like her, he suffered a stormy past of deprivation before achieving sudden success.
54	"Vas a perder a Beatriz"	25 January 2024	2.7
Julia takes her punishment and proves to Gerardo that for her there is no one above Bael, not even Enrique. Enrique tries to accompany Beatriz to the Vatican, but Bael shows him that their separation is inevitable. Gerardo warns Raúl about the punishment Bael will impose on him, but Raúl assures him that he has the power of God on his side. Daniel tries to force himself on Vicky, but Jorge arrives in time to save her.
55	"¿Crees poder controlar a Bael?"	26 January 2024	2.5
Enrique warns Beatriz that whenever she likes, she can take the jet and go on a trip, even though he is not included in the plan. Bael takes Ana's life as a sacrifice for helping Joel win the election. Julia warns Gerardo that at any moment, Enrique could dispense of his services as an advisor in the organization and he takes it as an offense to Bael. Raúl tries to make Jorge react by confessing the truth about their mother's death.
56	"Bael solo quiere un alma pura"	29 January 2024	2.5
Jorge regrets that Enrique sacrificed Nora, assuring that without realizing it, he also gave up Raúl. Nuria believes that Dolores is giving special attention to Juanito as a way to scam Beatriz and confronts her about it. Jorge asks Gerardo to go ahead with his preparation even though Enrique has refused. Bael locks Enrique in the mirror to get closer to Beatriz.
57	"Te he estado esperando, Juan"	30 January 2024	2.5
Dolores suggests to Gerardo to accelerate Juanito's preparation to prevent his family's love from taking him away from the path established by Bael. Julia gives Beatriz the opportunity to be friends in order to guide her towards a better relationship with Enrique. Cayetano shows before the high council the evidence of Bael's return but the cardinal ridicules him by pointing out his alcoholism. Dolores admits Juanito to an individual class taught by Bael.
58	"Sin mí no eres nada, Bael"	31 January 2024	2.4
Enrique breaks his pact with Humberto by asking him to surrender to the U.S. government in order for the organization to advance in the country. Cardinal Neri announces that he has been designated as the pope's first watchman, putting Cardinal Mondragón's interests at risk. Humberto reminds his daughter of the contingency plan he prepared in case Enrique dares to betray him. Enrique demands Bael to stay away from Juanito under the threat of breaking their pact and preventing his presence in the world.
59	"¿Quién es Nora?"	1 February 2024	2.5
Beatriz tries to reconcile with Vicky, but she complains to her mother for not letting her enjoy the life they have since she married Enrique de Martino. Thomas is forced to admit Helen to a psychiatric hospital so as not to ruin his political ambitions. Cayetano uses the sermon to spread a warning among his faithful about the dangers that lurk. Juanito seeks consolation with Beatriz for the torment they are going through and accidentally, they decipher the message written in their notebooks.
60	"Usar la fuerza de Bael"	2 February 2024	2.5
Julia tries to seduce Enrique by reminding him of how they used to enjoy the sins that satisfy Bael. Cayetano prays to God for the power to fulfill his commission and receives a clear sign that his prayers were heard. Beatriz asks Cayetano for support in dealing with the supernatural forces that haunt her home, giving him a way to get closer to Enrique. Enrique invokes the power of Bael to make Humberto pay for the offenses against him.
61	"Tú no puedes tener miedo, Juanito"	5 February 2024	2.3
Gerardo is sure that Father Cayetano's faith is not unbreakable and is willing to make him suffer. Beatriz tells Enrique that paranormal events are haunting her and Juanito, and that Nora is the name that keeps appearing. Jorge goes a step further in his plans and asks Ruth to be his wife. Enrique realizes that Nora's soul is still grieving for what he did to her and again asks for an apology.
62	"Con Bael a su lado, nada es imposible"	6 February 2024	2.5
Jorge tells his friends that Ruth agreed to be his wife and Carlos cannot hide his disappointment. Enrique and Father Cayetano see each other face to face; however, neither of them talk about their past in front of Beatriz. Gerardo is not convinced that Juanito is the best choice to become Enrique's successor and wants himself to be the one to have that honor. In order to obtain Enrique's bracelet, Father Cayetano succumbs to Bael's temptation.
63	"Quebrarse ante la tentación de Bael"	7 February 2024	2.4
Father Cayetano falls into Enrique's trap and Bael has a clear path to appear in front of him. Ruth is afraid of what is behind Jorge's marriage proposal and assures Carlos that she really loves him. Enrique fears that Jorge wants to follow in his footsteps in the organization and asks him not to. Father Cayetano is humiliated knowing that he fell into sin by trying to take Enrique's bracelet.
64	"Sé quién eres, Nora"	8 February 2024	N/A
After learning that Mondragón officiated at the wedding of Enrique and Beatriz, Cayetano has no doubt that he is an infiltrator. Gerardo wants to climb up the organization and does not mind using Jorge to hurt Enrique. Gerardo can't wait any longer to take Enrique's place and Bael gives him a vision. Certain that the ghost is Nora, Enrique's ex-wife, Beatriz begs her to leave her alone.
65	"Aquí tienes a Ruth, Bael"	9 February 2024	N/A
In his eagerness to obtain Bael's power, Jorge sacrifices Ruth thinking that it will work for him as it did for his father. After Ruth's death, Jorge realizes that Bael will not give him his power. Disappointed that Jorge wants to follow in his footsteps, Enrique takes his bracelet from him and asks him to stay away from the organization. Enrique assures Gerardo that if he had known the high price he would pay to be Bael's successor, he would not have accepted.
66	"Siempre voy a estar contigo, Jorge"	12 February 2024	N/A
Jorge discovers Carlos' betrayal and orders his arrest for Ruth's death. Eduardo arranges a meeting between Raúl and Enrique behind Cayetano's back. Vicky consoles Jorge for the loss of Ruth and in her approach, takes the opportunity to kiss him. Dolores uses Ruth's death to teach Juanito about death and how to conquer his fear.
67	"Despídete de Raúl, Enrique de Martino"	13 February 2024	N/A
Juanito talks to Enrique about Jorge as if he has a new understanding about the death of Ruth. Eduardo betrays Raúl's trust and arranges a meeting between Enrique and him. Jorge takes Raúl back to the De Martino mansion, where he encounters his mother's spirit and collapses. Enrique demands that the person responsible for the attack against Raúl be found to make him pay for messing with his son.
68	"Demuéstrame tu poder, Bael"	14 February 2024	N/A
Raúl sees Nora's spirit behind Beatriz and calls her mother, leaving Beatriz confused. Jorge offers Bael his eternal service in exchange for saving Raúl's life. Bael sends a message through Juanito to remind Jorge of his promise. Raúl points out to Enrique that there is still goodness within him and it is not too late to undo his pact with Bael.
69	"Bael quiere cerca a Beatriz"	15 February 2024	N/A
Cayetano sets a trap for Mondragón to unmask him as one of Bael's followers. Jorge lets Vicky see his romantic interest in her while she cannot hide her feelings for Raúl. Julia visits Enrique at his house but Beatriz gets tired of her impudence and demands her to leave. Gerardo finds out that Bael caused the accident that left Beatriz a widow.
70	"Los demonios se alimentan de las culpas"	16 February 2024	N/A
Beatriz interrupts the organization's meeting with her arrival and Enrique, annoyed, puts a stop to his wife's jealousy. Julia takes advantage of the argument between Enrique and Beatriz to seduce him. Raúl discovers that Juanito was enrolled in a school of the organization and fears for the academic preparation he is receiving. Cayetano visits Juanito's school and from the moment he meets Dolores, he realizes Bael's influence over the children.
71	"¡Huye Beatriz!"	19 February 2024	N/A
Enrique tells Beatriz that he has made a decision regarding the future of their relationship, even though she does not like it. Gerardo offers Enrique the idea of getting rid of Beatriz to stay alone with Juanito, but he demands that he never mess with his wife again. Beatriz awakens from a dream to see Nora's spirit standing in front of her, asking her to follow her. Nora's spirit warns Beatriz to get away from Enrique and Bael as quickly as possible.
72	"Te entrego a esta mujer virgen, Bael"	20 February 2024	N/A
Jorge warns Gerardo that he plans to win Bael's favor by delivering Vicky's purity. Cayetano suggests to Beatriz that she change Juanito's school, arguing that his teaching is not in line with her family's values. Vicky refuses to continue to blindly obey Beatriz's rules when she sees that none of this has paid off in gaining her trust. Jorge abuses Vicky to prove to Bael that he is faithful to his power.
73	"A Nora la enloqueció un demonio"	21 February 2024	N/A
Juanito offers Dolores a great clue to find Bael's steel. Eduardo gives in to Gerardo's pressure and agrees to be Bael's faithful servant. Raúl confesses to Beatriz the real reason for his mother's death. Vicky questions Jorge about what happened the night before but he evades her by assuring her that everything she wanted happened.
74	"El mal tiene muchas caras"	22 February 2024	N/A
Gerardo confesses to Bael that he has dedicated himself to causing trouble between the De Martino brothers to make them destroy each other. Raúl convinces Vicky to confess what happened to her. Raúl confronts Jorge about what he did to Vicky and reveals the reason why he defends her. Enrique decides to kick Jorge out of his house without worrying about his fate.
75	"¿Quién es Bael, Enrique?"	23 February 2024	N/A
Gerardo suggests to Jorge to end Enrique de Martino's reign so that he can takeover the organization. Jorge complains to Enrique for having preferred Beatriz over Bael and the mention of the demon makes her shudder. Juanito confirms that Jorge is behind the pain Vicky is feeling and vows to make him pay. Nuria regrets having kept Enrique's secret and seeks comfort with Cayetano.
76	"El diablo ronda buscando a quién devorar"	26 February 2024	2.9
The ghost of Nora awakens Vicky in the middle of the night and realizing she can see her, she desperately asks for her help. Jorge gathers certain members of the organization to recruit them in his favor and remove Enrique as head of the organization. Beatriz prays with a Bible in hand for a sign of what she faces and is surprised to see her prayer answered. Gerardo is taken to the crypt where Bael's favorite artifact is hidden, which will allow him to acquire all his powers.
77	"Bael es un demonio"	27 February 2024	2.9
In view of the discussion between Enrique and Gerardo, Bael manifests himself by demanding that they bring the dagger to his presence. Cayetano is disappointed in Eduardo when he discovers that he is already collaborating with Bael's sons. Jorge gathers the members of the organization to announce his plan to remove Enrique as head of the organization. A mysterious presence makes sure that Beatriz listens to Nora's tapes where she explains who exactly Bael is.
78	"¡Bael vive en mí!"	28 February 2024	3.0
Eduardo refuses to continue helping the organization and Dolores decides to put an end to him. Julia warns Enrique about Jorge's secret meetings and asks him to solve the problem head-on, as Bael would do. Tired of keeping secrets, Enrique comes clean with Beatriz about the root of his power and his pact with Bael. Bael shows Gerardo the events that will happen for Juanito to become the new successor.
79	"Yo me quedo con Enrique"	29 February 2024	2.8
Nora manifests herself again to Beatriz, asking her to listen to her recordings to learn the truth about Enrique. Beatriz despises Nuria when she learns that she already knew about the pact between Enrique and Bael and still manipulated her to marry him. Beatriz tries to explain to Juanito her separation from Enrique but is surprised to see that he prefers to stay with his stepfather. Enrique tries to reason with Jorge but he warns him that he will only stop if he names him as his successor.
80	"Por Beatriz estoy dispuesto a todo"	1 March 2024	2.9
Bael demands that Enrique give him Beatriz in sacrifice in order to go ahead with the succession. Dolores calms Juanito's fear of being separated from Enrique by assuring him that he will do Bael's bidding. Beatriz seeks Cayetano's advice and he assures her that her love is the most powerful force to fight against Bael. Julia realizes that Enrique will never be able to feel for her what he feels for Beatriz and, devastated, she ends her pact with Bael and turns to dust.
81	"Servir a Bael"	3 March 2024	3.0
82	"Ya sé dominar el miedo"	3 March 2024	3.0
Nora warns Vicky about the dangers her family faces and asks her to flee as quickly as possible from the organization. Dolores shows her true face to Cayetano, who confronts her without fear, but an accident causes her imminent end. Gerardo's sacrifice triggers Bael's manifestation. Enrique refuses to go ahead with the succession and is willing to do anything to protect his family from Bael. Juanito knows that the succession did take place, for despite the fact that there are no apparent signs, he is the new bearer of Bael.

== Reception ==
=== Ratings ===
Viewership and ratings per season of El maleficio
Season	Timeslot (CT)	Episodes	First aired		Last aired		Avg. viewers (millions)
Season	Timeslot (CT)	Episodes	Date	Viewers (millions)	Date	Viewers (millions)	Avg. viewers (millions)
1	Mon–Fri 9:30 p.m.	58	13 November 2023	2.7	3 March 2024	3.0	2.44

=== Awards and nominations ===
Year	Award	Category	Nominated	Result	Ref
2024	Produ Awards	Best Lead Actress - Telenovela	Verónica Montes	Nominated	
