= Michel Duval =

Mexican actor, singer, songwriter, composer and model

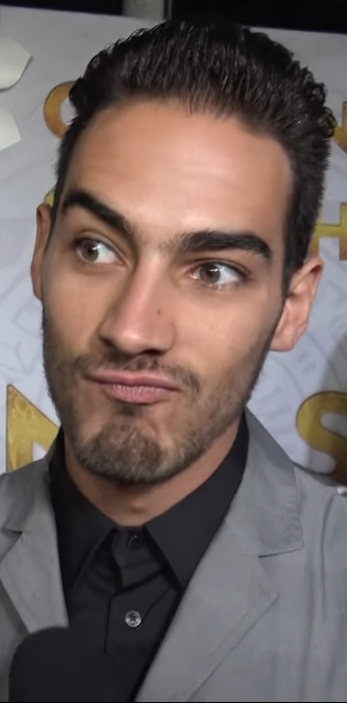
- Born: Michel Maya Dussauge; February 10, 1994 (age 32); Mexico City, Mexico
- Occupations: Actor, singer, model
- Years active: 2012–present
- Notable work: Señora Acero as Salvador Acero
- Height: 1.79 cm (5 ft 10 in)
- Mother: Consuelo Duval

Michel Duval (born Michel Maya Dussauge, February 10, 1994) is a Mexican actor, singer, songwriter, composer and model, who is best known for portraying Salvador Acero in Telemundo's Senora Acero.

== Early life ==
Michel Duval was born on February 10, 1994, with the name of Michel Dussauge. He is the son of actress and comedian Consuelo Duval. He started acting at a very young age, and during that time, he discovered that his passion was art. He studied at Televisa's Centro de Educación Artística (CEA) and he also went for a time to the American Academy of Dramatic Arts. After appearing in Atrévete a soñar, Duval made his debut in the telenovela Lo imperdonable (2015). He also made brief appearances in various shows in Mexico. He got a role in the MTV Latin America series Último año where he played Miguel Angel Valdez in the pilot episode. After the success of Último año, he decided to move to Los Angeles, California to pursue a new career where he studied acting and was able to start a musical career. In theater, he acted in Romeo and Juliet and Pericles in New York City. Duval's best work to date was the major role of Salvador Acero, the son of Sara Aguilar, in the hit Telemundo action drama Señora Acero (2015–2018), starring Blanca Soto and Carolina Miranda. In late 2018, he starred on Syfy's Deadly Class, which aired from January to March 2019. He has also shared credits with his mother Consuelo Duval in the 2020 comedy-drama Herederos por accidente, alongside Maite Perroni and Cuca Escribano.

In 2021, he was cast as Andy Cruz in Telemundo's romantic comedy Parientes a la fuerza, with Bárbara de Regil, Guy Ecker and Carmen Aub. Later on, Duval reunites with Señora Acero co-star Oka Giner in Televisa's Marea de pasiones (2024), alongside Matías Novoa.

== Personal life ==
In 2016, Duval was in a relationship with his Señora Acero co-star Carolina Miranda. They later broke up in 2019. He is currently single. His maternal last name Dussauge have a French origin, from the Saône-et-Loire region.

== Selected filmography ==
Year	Project	Role	Notes
2012	La rosa de Guadalupe	Toño	Episode: "El amor como lo veo yo"
2012	Último año	Miguel Ángel Valdés	Recurring role
2015	Lo imperdonable	Teo	Recurring role; 35 episodes
2015–2018	Señora Acero	Salvador Acero Aguilar	Main role (seasons 2–5); 266 episodes
2017	Queen of the South	Enrique "Kique" Jiménez	Recurring role; 5 episodes
2019	Deadly Class	Chico	Main role
2020	Diablero	Alejandro / Tepoz / Ahuizotl	Main role; 5 episodes
2020	Herederos por accidente	Marco Antonio Márquez Ochelli de la Garza	Main role
2021–2022	Parientes a la fuerza	Andrés "Andy" Cruz Paneta	Main role
2024	Marea de pasiones	Tiago Grajales	
2025	Mi verdad oculta	Bruno Lizárraga Arenas	Main role

== Awards and nominations ==
Year	Award	Category	Works	Result
2016	Premios Tu Mundo	Revelation of the Year	Señora Acero	Nominated
2017	Premios Tu Mundo	Favorite Actor	Señora Acero	Nominated
2017	Premios Tu Mundo	I'm Sexy and I know it	Señora Acero	Nominated
