= Vino el amor =

Mexican telenovela

- Genre: Telenovela
- Based on: La chúcara by Julio Rojas Gutiérrez
- Written by: Janely Esther Lee Torres; Vanesa Varela Magallón; Fernando Garcilita; Julio César Nájera
- Directed by: Salvador Sánchez; Santiago Barbosa; Bernardo Nájera; Jorge Amaya
- Starring: Gabriel Soto; Cynthia Klitbo; Azela Robinson; Irina Baeva; Mar Contreras; Moisés Arizmendi; Verónica Jaspeado; Kimberly Dos Ramos; Christian de la Campa; Juan Vidal; José Eduardo Derbez; Gloria Aura; Sofía Castro; Raúl Coronado; Mario Loria; Luciano Zacharski; Yanet Sedano; Óscar Bonfiglio; Bárbara López; Juan Carlos Serrano
- Theme music composer: José Luis Roma; Paolo Stefanoni; Eduardo Tagle
- Opening theme: "Vino el amor" by Río Roma
- Country of origin: Mexico
- Original language: Spanish
- No. of episodes: 141

Production
- Executive producer: José Alberto Castro
- Producers: Ernesto Hernández; Fausto Sainz
- Production locations: Querétaro, Mexico; Sonoma and Napa, California, United States
- Editors: Juan Ordóñez; Héctor Flores; Arturo Rodríguez
- Camera setup: Multi-camera
- Production company: Televisa

Original release
- Network: Las Estrellas
- Release: 8 August 2016 – 19 February 2017

Vino el amor (English: Along Came Love) is a Mexican telenovela produced by José Alberto Castro for Televisa. It is a remake of the 2014 Chilean telenovela La chúcara by Julio Rojas Gutiérrez. The series stars Irina Baeva and Gabriel Soto. It aired on Las Estrellas from 8 August 2016 to 19 February 2017. In the United States, it aired on Univision from 25 October 2016 to 8 May 2017.

Vino el amor won four awards out of nine nominations at the Premios TVyNovelas 2017, including the Best Antagonist Actress award for Azela Robinson.

== Plot ==
David is a winery owner who lost his wife Lisa in a suspicious accident perpetrated by her obsessive sister Graciela. David becomes so depressed that he neglects his children, Fernanda and Bobby, and the vineyard he loves so much. His sinister mother-in-law Lilian and supposed best friend Juan try to take advantage of the situation to steal David's fortune, but an unexpected arrival to the vineyard alters their plans.

Luciana is a cheerful and impetuous youngster who lived in the vineyard with her family several years ago. She and her father Marcos were deported to Mexico by the orders of Lilian, whose goal is to get rid of the entire family as she sent officials to arrest them despite having their documents in order and were in progress of becoming U.S. citizens. Lilian always wanted revenge against Luciana's mother Marta due to the fact that her husband had cheated on her. After her father died, Luciana returns as a beautiful young woman and disrupts David's life.

Despite their love-hate relationship, Luciana changes everything for the better and David learns to appreciate life and starts to love again by gaining Luciana's affection. However, with Lilian's hatred towards the lower class, Graciela's obsession with David, and Fernanda's dislike for Luciana, the trio plan to prevent Luciana from ever staying in the United States.

== Cast ==
=== Main ===
- Gabriel Soto as David Robles
- Cynthia Klitbo as Marta Estrada de Muñoz
- Azela Robinson as Lilian Palacios
- Irina Baeva as Luciana Muñoz
- Mar Contreras as Susan O'Neal Williams
- Moisés Arizmendi as César Callejas
- Verónica Jaspeado as Sonia Ortiz
- Kimberly Dos Ramos as Graciela Palacios
- Christian de la Campa as Juan Téllez
- Juan Vidal as Brian Gutiérrez
- José Eduardo Derbez as León Muñoz
- Gloria Aura as Perla Vidal
- Sofía Castro as Fernanda Robles
- Raúl Coronado as Miguel Díaz
- Mario Loria as Ramón Flores
- Luciano Zacharski as Carlos "Tano" Flores
- Yanet Sedano as Carolina "Carito" González
- Óscar Bonfiglio as Adolfo Ballesteros
- Bárbara López as Érika Ballesteros
- Juan Carlos Serrano as Mark Evans

=== Recurring and guest stars ===
- Alejandro Ávila as Marcos Muñoz
- Laura Carmine as Lisa Palacios de Robles
- Emilio Beltrán Ulrich as Bobby Robles
- Natalia Juárez as Caroline
- Samantha Siqueiros as Katy
- Andrés Roma as Peter

== Production ==
Vino el amor is based on the 2014 Chilean telenovela La chúcara, created by Julio Rojas Gutiérrez. This adaptation is written by Janely Esther Lee Torres and Vanesa Varela Magallón. Salvador Sánchez and Santiago Barbosa served as scene directors, with Jorge Amaya and Bernardo Nájera as camera directors.

=== Development ===
The development of Vino el amor focuses on the issues of Mexican emigration to the United States in search of "the American dream" and how these Latinos are being humiliated and offended by police officers and ruthless people. It also tackled other topics such as bipolarity. Majority of the filming occurred in the vineyards of Napa, Sonoma and San Francisco, California at the United States. The telenovela was also filmed in Mexico City and Tijuana, with part of the cast filmed scenes in Foro 14 of Televisa San Ángel.

=== Casting ===
On May 25, 2016, TVyNovelas Magazine confirmed that Gabriel Soto and Irina Baeva were cast in the lead roles. On June 8, 2016, José Alberto Castro confirmed that Kimberly Dos Ramos and Christian de la Campa were cast as the antagonists of the telenovela; both actors had an exclusive contract with Telemundo and therefore they decided to accept Televisa's job offer. Luciano Zacharski, who previously worked for TV Azteca for years, and Juan Vidal were also confirmed as part of the cast. On June 30, 2016, Laura Carmine was confirmed to guest star in the first few episodes where she played as the wife of Gabriel Soto's character.

For Kimberly Dos Ramos, Vino el amor has made her character to be hated just like Marjorie de Sousa's antagonist role in the telenovela Amores verdaderos (2012). The character of Graciela contributed a lot to the telenovela to help people who suffer from bipolarity to confront their situation. Dos Ramos stated: "It is gratifying to know that in some way my character can help the relatives of those who suffer from bipolarity seek solutions." In late September 2016, Dos Ramos caused controversy in an episode where she was topless, this being an idea of Televisa to be able to increase its ratings in its productions.

== Reception ==
In the United States, Vino el amor was very well received by the American public only in its premiere that measured 2,143,000 total viewers. It was one of the most viewed productions of Univision.

== Awards and nominations ==
Year	Award	Category	Nominated	Result
2017	35th TVyNovelas Awards	Best Telenovela of the Year	José Alberto Castro	Nominated
2017	35th TVyNovelas Awards	Best Antagonist Actress	Azela Robinson	Won
2017	35th TVyNovelas Awards	Best Leading Actress	Cynthia Klitbo	Nominated
2017	35th TVyNovelas Awards	Best Supporting Actress	Verónica Jaspeado	Won
2017	35th TVyNovelas Awards	Best Supporting Actor	Juan Vidal	Won
2017	35th TVyNovelas Awards	Best Young Lead Actress	Sofia Castro	Nominated
2017	35th TVyNovelas Awards	Best Female Revelation	Bárbara López	Won
2017	35th TVyNovelas Awards	Best Original Story or Adaptation	Vino el amor	Nominated
2017	35th TVyNovelas Awards	Best Direction of the Cameras	Salvador Sánchez and Santiago Barbosa	Nominated
