= Tierra de amor y coraje =

- Genre: Telenovela
- Based on: Irmãos Coragem by Janete Clair
- Developed by: José Alberto Castro; Fernando Garcilita
- Written by: María Chavez; Ricardo Aviles; Carlos Marín
- Directed by: Luis Manzo; Santiago Barbosa
- Starring: Brandon Peniche; Emmanuel Palomares; Emilio Osorio; Sofía Castro; Sergio Goyri
- Theme music composer: César G. Ross; Pablo Pinilla Osuna; Lara Pinilla; Adrián Ghiardo; Pablo Pinilla
- Opening theme: "Libertad y coraje" by César G. Ross
- Composers: Armando López Pérez; Carlos Garibay Galicia; Julio Blanco Vázquez
- Country of origin: Mexico
- Original language: Spanish
- No. of seasons: 1
- No. of episodes: 77

Production
- Executive producer: José Alberto Castro
- Producers: Ernesto Hernández; Fausto Sáinz
- Cinematography: Gerónimo Denti Generali
- Editors: Juan Ordóñez; Héctor Flores; Arturo Rodríguez; Alejandro Iglesias; Mauricio Manzano
- Camera setup: Multi-camera
- Production company: TelevisaUnivision

Original release
- Network: Vix
- Release: 7 August – 20 November 2026

Tierra de amor y coraje (English: Land of Love and Courage) is a Mexican telenovela produced by José Alberto Castro for TelevisaUnivision. It is based on the 1970 Brazilian telenovela Irmãos Coragem, created by Janete Clair. The series stars Emmanuel Palomares, Brandon Peniche, Emilio Osorio and Sofía Castro. It aired on Vix from 7 August 2026 to 20 November 2026.

== Plot ==
The telenovela follows the lives of the Coraje brothers: Juan, a strong man committed to defending the family ranch; Jerónimo, a strategist focused on securing the future of the business; and Lalo, the youngest of the family, who is still trying to find his path. Their lives change with the arrival of Clara Barrios, an intelligent and determined woman who returns to Arizona to take on the legacy of her father, Rogelio Barrios, a powerful businessman willing to do anything to achieve his goals. The Coraje and Barrios ranches have been neighbors and rivals for years. What appears to be a dispute over access to the river is only the beginning of a much deeper conflict.

When Clara and Juan meet for the first time, an immediate tension arises that will mark the beginning of an intense relationship. While Jerónimo is captivated by Clara's intelligence and determination, and Lalo develops feelings that go beyond admiration, a dark secret begins to come to light. Rogelio Barrios has set his sights on the Coraje family's lands after discovering hidden mineral wealth in the region, triggering a series of events that threaten to destroy both families. Amid secrets, betrayals, and power struggles, Clara and Juan discover that behind their rivalry lies a connection they cannot ignore.

== Cast ==
=== Main ===
- Brandon Peniche as Jerónimo Coraje
- Emmanuel Palomares as Juan Coraje
- Emilio Osorio as Eduardo "Lalo" Coraje
- Sofía Castro as Clara Barrios
- Sergio Goyri as Rogelio Barrios
- Iván Arana as Falcón
- Dalilah Polanco as Jovita
- Moisés Arizmendi as Paco
- Mar Contreras as Estrella Barrios
- Arantza Ruiz as Jackie
- Federico Ayos as Jim
- Claudia Zepeda as Lina
- Mar Bonnelly as Adela
- Daniela Martínez as Rita
- Minnie West as Daniela
- Arena Ibarra as Debbie
- Claudia Bouza as Paula
- Edmundo Siller as Pedro
- Leo Casta as Toño
- Patricia Navidad as Roxie

=== Recurring and guest stars ===
- Arturo Peniche as Manuel
- Natalia Esperon as Patricia
- Eugenio Cobo as Rafael
- Luis Uribe as the Mayor
- Mario Loria as the Sheriff
- Christian de la Campa as Mark Corrales
- Santiago Zenteno as Esteban

== Production ==
=== Development ===
In December 2025, José Alberto Castro announced he would produce a remake of the Brazilian telenovela Irmãos Coragem. Filming of the telenovela took place from 5 February 2026 to 13 July 2026. On 19 March 2026, Tierra de amor y coraje was announced as the title of the telenovela.

=== Casting ===
In December 2025, Emmanuel Palomares, Brandon Peniche, Emilio Osorio were announced in the lead roles. On 6 February 2026, Sofía Castro was announced to star opposite of Palomares, Peniche and Osorio.

== Ratings ==
=== Mexico ratings ===
Viewership and ratings per season of Tierra de amor y coraje
Season	Timeslot (CT)	Episodes	First aired		Last aired		Avg. viewers (millions)
Season	Timeslot (CT)	Episodes	Date	Viewers (millions)	Date	Viewers (millions)	Avg. viewers (millions)
1	Mon–Fri 9:30 p.m.	31	5 October 2026	4.21	TBA	TBD	3.92

== Episodes ==
No.	Title	Original release date	Las Estrellas air date	Mexico linear viewers (millions)
1	"Familia en problemas"	7 August 2026	5 October 2026	4.21
2	"La gran tragedia"	7 August 2026	6 October 2026	3.79
3	"Mujer a cargo"	7 August 2026	7 October 2026	3.90
4	"Recuperar a los caballos"	7 August 2026	8 October 2026	3.75
5	"Como en los viejos tiempos"	7 August 2026	9 October 2026	3.89
6	"En la feria"	14 August 2026	12 October 2026	3.73
7	"Trabajo en equipo"	14 August 2026	13 October 2026	4.02
8	"En el río"	14 August 2026	14 October 2026	N/A
9	"Un héroe"	14 August 2026	15 October 2026	3.80
10	"Amor de tres"	14 August 2026	16 October 2026	3.76
11	"El enemigo cerca"	21 August 2026	19 October 2026	3.58
12	"Planes de construcción"	21 August 2026	20 October 2026	3.98
13	"La periodista"	21 August 2026	21 October 2026	4.03
14	"Decir adiós"	21 August 2026	22 October 2026	4.03
15	"Autoridad corrupta"	21 August 2026	23 October 2026	3.79
16	"Odio del pasado"	28 August 2026	26 October 2026	3.93
17	"Ese beso"	28 August 2026	27 October 2026	3.83
18	"La bendición"	28 August 2026	28 October 2026	3.67
19	"Favor especial"	28 August 2026	29 October 2026	4.01
20	"Decisión arriesgada"	28 August 2026	30 October 2026	3.49
21	"Ayuda inmediata"	4 September 2026	2 November 2026	3.54
22	"Impacto total"	4 September 2026	3 November 2026	4.15
23	"Un socio extra"	4 September 2026	4 November 2026	3.78
24	"Esperanza"	4 September 2026	5 November 2026	3.92
25	"La despedida"	4 September 2026	6 November 2026	3.75
26	"De padre a hija"	11 September 2026	9 November 2026	3.76
27	"Mucha información"	11 September 2026	10 November 2026	4.05
28	"Crece la familia"	11 September 2026	11 November 2026	3.84
29	"Lejos de todo"	11 September 2026	12 November 2026	3.77
30	"Detención inmediata"	11 September 2026	13 November 2026	3.79
31	"Denuncia anónima"	18 September 2026	16 November 2026	3.43
32	"Diferentes apoyos"	18 September 2026	17 November 2026	3.46
33	"Fuera de prisión"	18 September 2026	18 November 2026	TBD
34	"Un intruso"	18 September 2026	19 November 2026	TBD
35	"El amor primero"	18 September 2026	TBA	TBD
36	"Mejor adiós"	25 September 2026	TBA	TBD
37	"Error de jinete"	25 September 2026	TBA	TBD
38	"Nuevas tierras"	25 September 2026	TBA	TBD
39	"Amenaza constante"	25 September 2026	TBA	TBD
40	"Escena sensual"	25 September 2026	TBA	TBD
41	"Ahora o nunca"	2 October 2026	TBA	TBD
42	"Fragmentación"	2 October 2026	TBA	TBD
43	"Primero la ley"	2 October 2026	TBA	TBD
44	"El enemigo cerca"	2 October 2026	TBA	TBD
45	"Una boda intima"	2 October 2026	TBA	TBD
46	"Recolección de firmas"	9 October 2026	TBA	TBD
47	"Lo poco que nos queda"	9 October 2026	TBA	TBD
48	"Nueva construcción"	9 October 2026	TBA	TBD
49	"Locura de amor"	9 October 2026	TBA	TBD
50	"Atropellada"	9 October 2026	TBA	TBD
51	"El padre verdadero"	16 October 2026	TBA	TBD
52	"Lo más sagrado"	16 October 2026	TBA	TBD
53	"Información delicada"	16 October 2026	TBA	TBD
54	"Plan en conjunto"	16 October 2026	TBA	TBD
55	"Una multa impagable"	16 October 2026	TBA	TBD
56	"Papá por la fuerza"	23 October 2026	TBA	TBD
57	"Corazones destruidos"	23 October 2026	TBA	TBD
58	"Decisión mortal"	23 October 2026	TBA	TBD
59	"Más vale tarde que nunca"	23 October 2026	TBA	TBD
60	"La verdad de la amante"	23 October 2026	TBA	TBD
61	"Decepción paternal"	30 October 2026	TBA	TBD
62	"Corazón cerrado"	30 October 2026	TBA	TBD
63	"Investigar las tierras"	30 October 2026	TBA	TBD
64	"Manipulación total"	30 October 2026	TBA	TBD
65	"Capítulo 65"	30 October 2026	TBA	TBD
66	"Sociedad terminada"	6 November 2026	TBA	TBD
67	"Daño súbito"	6 November 2026	TBA	TBD
68	"Ven conmigo"	6 November 2026	TBA	TBD
69	"Una muerte más"	6 November 2026	TBA	TBD
70	"Lucha de poderes"	6 November 2026	TBA	TBD
71	"Sin invitación"	13 November 2026	TBA	TBD
72	"Sin refugio"	13 November 2026	TBA	TBD
73	"Esta es tu casa"	13 November 2026	TBA	TBD
74	"El gran escándalo"	13 November 2026	TBA	TBD
75	"La propuesta"	20 November 2026	TBA	TBD
76	"La misma cuerda"	20 November 2026	TBA	TBD
77	"Todo el coraje"	20 November 2026	TBA	TBD

== Release ==
Tierra de amor y coraje premiered first on Vix in the United States on 7 August 2026, and in Mexico on 4 September 2026.

The series made its broadcast television premiere in the United States on Univision on 7 September 2026, and in Mexico on Las Estrellas on 5 October 2026.
