= Sofía Castro =

Mexican actress (born 1996)

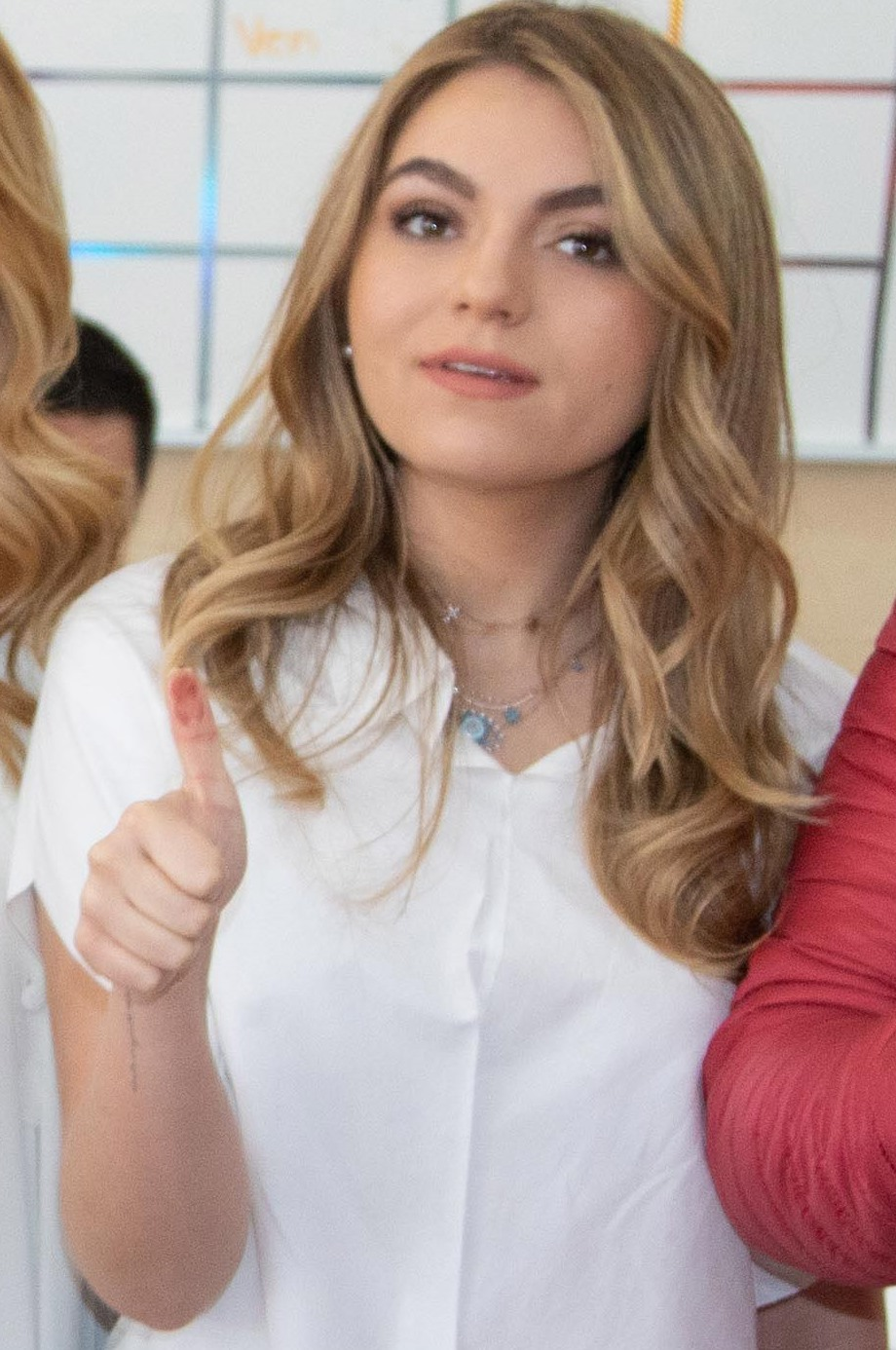
- Castro in 2018
- Born: Angélica Sofía Castro Rivera; 30 October 1996 (age 29); Mexico City, Mexico
- Years active: 2010–present
- Parents: José Alberto Castro (father); Angélica Rivera (mother)
- Family: Verónica Castro (aunt); Cristian Castro (cousin)

Angélica Sofía Castro Rivera (born 30 October 1996), known professionally as Sofía Castro, is a Mexican actress. She is the daughter of Angelica Rivera and José Alberto Castro. She is the former step-daughter of former president Enrique Peña Nieto.

== Filmography ==
=== Television ===
Year	Title	Role	Notes
2007	La hora pico	Herself	TV series
2007-2008	Lola, érase una vez	Beatriz Lorenzo Morales	Special appearance
2007-2008	Skimo	Wendy	TV series
2008-2009	La rosa de Guadalupe		Various Episodes
2009-2010	Verano de amor	Romina Zarate Blas	Special appearance
2010-2011	Teresa	Lilia	Supporting role
2011-2012	Esperanza del corazón	Eglantina	Supporting role
2012	Cachito de cielo	Sofía "Sofi" Salvatierra	Supporting role
2012-2013	Como dice el dicho		3 episodes
2013-2014	Por siempre mi amor	Dafne Quintana Herrera	Antagonist
2016	El hotel de los secretos	Eugenia	Supporting role
2016-2017	Vino el amor	Fernanda Robles	Main role
2019-2020	El Dragón: Return of a Warrior	Kenia	Supporting role
2021	Malverde: El Santo Patrón	Lucrecia Luna	Main role
2023	Tierra de esperanza	Valentina Rangel	Supporting role
2023	El maleficio	Vicky Montes	
2025	Con esa misma mirada	Antonia Hidalgo	
2026	Tierra de amor y coraje	Clara	Lead role
2026	Hotel todo incluido	Marcela	Main role

== Awards and nominations ==
Year	Award	Category	Telenovela	Result
2013	Premios TVyNovelas	Best Female Revelation	Cachito de cielo	Nominated
2013	Premios People en Español	Best New Talent	Cachito de cielo	Nominated
2017	Premios TVyNovelas	Best Young Lead Actress	Vino el amor	Nominated
