= Juan Vidal =

Mexican actor

- Born: 12 February 1977 (age 49); Santo Domingo, Dominican Republic
- Education: Centro de Educación Artística
- Occupation: Actor
- Years active: 1995–present

Juan Vidal (born 12 February 1977 in Santo Domingo, Dominican Republic), is a Dominican actor currently based in Mexico.

He became known in his native country after winning the Mister Dominican Republic contest in 1995. Subsequently, he participated in the Mister World in Turkey, but he was not chosen. He studied acting and dramaturgy at the Centro de Educación Artística of Televisa.

== Career ==
He began his acting career in the United States on the CBS series The Guiding Light. In 1999, he moved to Mexico, where it has become known for participating in several telenovelas of Televisión Azteca. His entire acting career has been mostly in Mexico, although he has also participated in several theater plays in United States and the Dominican Republic. Vidal has been the only TV Azteca actor to be recognized at the TVyNovelas Awards, although currently it does not have an exclusive contract with the network.

== Filmography ==
Film roles
Year	Title	Roles	Notes
2004	Desnudos	Roberto	
2008	Mea Culpa	Guillermo	
2009	Carpe Diem	Stewart	
2018	Cofradía	Ian	

Television roles
Year	Title	Roles	Notes
2001	Como en el cine	Federico	
2006	Decisiones	Charlie	Episode: "El misterio de Natalia"
2006	Las dos caras de Ana	Cristóbal Acosta	
2007	Acorralada	Enrique "Kike" Díaz	
2009	Alma indomable	Raúl Urbaneja	
2010	La loba	Alberto Colombo	
2010	Cada quien su santo	Ciro	Episode: "Modelo 76"
2012	La mujer de Judas	Leoncio	
2013	Destino	Germán Aguirre De Alba	
2014	Las Bravo	Secundino Godínez "Adonis"	
2015–2016	Tanto amor	Rafael Lombardo	
2016–2017	Vino el amor	Gutiérrez	Series regular; 95 episodes
2017	Mi marido tiene familia	Julián	Recurring role (season 1); 34 episodes
2018	La Piloto	Bastian Regueros	Series regular (season 2); 47 episodes
2019–2020	Soltero con hijas	El Calamal	
2021–2022	Parientes a la fuerza	Wesley	
2022	Junta de vecinos	Dr. Elías Gamero	
2023	Los 50	Himself	Contestant
