= Así en el barrio como en el cielo =

Mexican telenovela

- Genre: Telenovela
- Created by: Guillermo López; Leticia López Margali
- Directed by: Fabián Corres; Juan Patrón Fox
- Starring: Juan Manuel Bernal; Verónica Merchant; Patricia Bernal; José Alonso; Marcela Guirado; Luciano Zacharsky
- Opening theme: "Nadie como tú" by Yahir
- Country of origin: Mexico
- Original language: Spanish
- No. of episodes: 120

Production
- Executive producer: Fides Velasco
- Producer: Jacky Castro
- Running time: 42-60 minutes
- Production company: TV Azteca

Original release
- Network: Azteca Trece
- Release: February 16 – July 31, 2015

Así en el barrio como en el cielo (English: So in the neighborhood as in heaven) is a Mexican telenovela produced by Fides Velasco for TV Azteca. It is an original story of Guillermo Ríos, Leticia López Margalli and Eugenio Derbez.

Marcela Guirado, Luciano Zacharsky and José Alonso star as the protagonists, with the antagonistic participation of Patricia Bernal.

The storyline includes the legendary Avándaro rock festival ("The Mexican Woodstock") of 1971 as its background.

== Cast ==
- Juan Manuel Bernal as Jesús El Gallo López
- Verónica Merchant as Aurora de Ferrara
- Patricia Bernal as Francesca Ferrara
- José Alonso as Expedito López
- Marcela Guirado as María López
- Luciano Zacharsky as Octavio Ferrara
- Fernando Luján as Marcelo Ferrara
- Bárbara del Regil as Lucía Fernanda Mercado
- Mariana Torres as Jacky López
- Roberta Burns as Bernarda López
- Carmen Delgado as La Pechu
- Alejandro Cuetara as Héctor Ferrara
- Armando Torrea as Flavio Ferrara
- Gerardo Lama as Patricio Ferrara
- Fran Meric as Casandra Legarreta
- Itari Marta as Verónica Ferrara
- Paloma Woolrich as Jacinta López
- Héctor Kotsifakis as Demóstenes
- Ximena Ramos as Paola "Pollola" Lopez
- Alenka Rios as Heidy Castro
- Alma Rosa Añorve as Joaquína
- Luis Carlos Muñoz as Kevin
- Pablo Portillo as Donky
- Rodolfo Valdés as Claudio
- Hugo Albores - El Enchilado
- Abel Fernando - El Bulldog
- Alessandra Pozzo - Yolanda
- Carlos Álvarez - Dr. Briseño
- Guillermo Ríos - Anselmo Chavero / Antonio
- Marliese Edelmann - Sofía
- Greg Kaufmann as Alfin
- Mariana Castillo as Franccesca Ferrara (Young)
- Karelly Gillies as Extra "Daira"
- Valeria Lorduguin as Perla
