= Unhappily Ever After (film) =

Infelices para siempre
- Theatrical release poster
- Directed by: Noé Santillán-López
- Written by: Miguel García Moreno; Adriana Pelusi
- Produced by: Candy Alvarado; Jorge Aragón; Eric Arcos Maldonado; Guadalupe Sosa; Saul Sosa; Celines Toribio
- Starring: Adrián Uribe; Consuelo Duval; Angélica Aragón; Livia Brito
- Cinematography: Daniel Anguiano
- Edited by: Camilo Abadía; Juan Manuel Figueroa; Rodrigo Zozaya Mac Gregor
- Production company: NoDancingToday
- Distributed by: Videocine
- Release date: January 26, 2023
- Running time: 90 minutes
- Country: Mexico
- Language: Spanish
- Box office: $5,6 million

Unhappily Ever After (Spanish: Infelices para siempre) is a 2023 Mexican romantic comedy film directed by Noé Santillán-López and written by Miguel García Moreno & Adriana Pelusi. Starring Adrián Uribe, Consuelo Duval, Angélica Aragón and Livia Brito. It premiered on January 26, 2023, in Mexican theaters.

== Synopsis ==
María José and Alfredo have been married for almost 20 years but they can't stand each other anymore. Pooling their savings, their children give them a trip to Puerto Peñasco to the same hotel where they celebrated their honeymoon. However, the couple will be tormented by a spell that will hold them in a time loop on the day of their anniversary, in order to get out they must remember the reasons why they got married.

== Cast ==
The actors participating in this film are:

- Adrián Uribe as Alfredo García
  - Carlos Gaticas as Young Alfredo García
- Consuelo Duval as María José Márquez
  - Paly Duval as Young María José
- Niko Antonyan as Tolstoi
- Angélica Aragón as Grandmother
- Luis Arrieta as Ignacio Rosas
- Livia Brito as Carmen Pelusi
- Carolina Miranda as Bicha
- Lindsey Rojas as Volleyball Player
- Ruy Senderos as Bicho
- Jessica Taylor as Karla
- Ari Telch as Doctor Orozco
- Celines Toribio as Flight Attendant
- Isabella Vázquez as Nina
- Elizabeth Cervantes as Chamana

== Production ==
Principal photography began on July 18, 2019 and ended on August 15 of the same year in Puerto Peñasco, Mexico.

== Reception ==
Javier Quintanar Polanco from Crónica negatively criticized the film, pointing out the bumpy and contradictory script that reaches the ridiculous, the obfuscating editing and the little chemistry between its two main characters. On the other hand, Diana Conrado from the portal Por amor al cine favorably reviewed the film, highlighting the performances of the cast, especially the performances of the leading duo (Adrián Uribe & Consuelo Duval) calling them credible.

== Television series ==
Hotel todo incluido, a television series based on the film, premiered on Vix on 28 August 2026. Of the film's cast, only Consuelo Duval returned for the series. Adrián Uribe and Isabella Vázquez were replaced in the series by Ricardo Fastlicht and Ximena Lecuona respectively.
