= Tierra de esperanza =

- Genre: Telenovela
- Based on: La Tormenta by Humberto Olivieri
- Developed by: José Alberto Castro; Vanesa Varela
- Written by: Alejandro Pohlenz; María Chávez; Fabiola López Neri
- Directed by: Carlos Cock; Rubén Nelhiño Acosta
- Starring: Carolina Miranda; Andrés Palacios; Luis Roberto Guzmán; Mariana Seoane
- Theme music composer: Isidro Chávez Espinoza
- Opening theme: "La esperanza" by Espinoza Paz
- Composers: Armando López; Berenice González; Osvaldo García
- Country of origin: Mexico
- Original language: Spanish
- No. of seasons: 1
- No. of episodes: 60

Production
- Executive producer: José Alberto Castro
- Producers: Ernesto Hernández; Fausto Sainz
- Editors: Juan Ordóñez; Héctor Flores; Arturo Rodríguez
- Production company: TelevisaUnivision

Original release
- Network: Las Estrellas
- Release: 12 June – 1 September 2023

Tierra de esperanza (English: Land of Hope) is a Mexican telenovela produced by José Alberto Castro for TelevisaUnivision. The series is based on the 2005 American telenovela La Tormenta, created by Humberto Olivieri. It aired on Las Estrellas from 12 June 2023 to 1 September 2023. The series stars Carolina Miranda, Andrés Palacios, Luis Roberto Guzmán and Mariana Seoane.

== Premise ==
When her father is arrested for fraud, María Teresa (Carolina Miranda), a businesswoman, must step in and take over La Esperanza, a ranch left to her by her mother, where she meets Santos (Andrés Palacios), the ranch foreman with whom she will constantly disagree. The frequent conflicts between María Teresa and Santos eventually lead them to fall in love.

== Cast ==
- Carolina Miranda as María Teresa Arteaga
- Andrés Palacios as Santos Sandoval
- Luis Roberto Guzmán as Marco Rivas
- Mariana Seoane as Bernarda Rangel
- Sofía Castro as Valentina Rangel
- Martha Julia as Adriana Espinoza
- Nuria Bages as Remedios
- Natalia Esperón as Norma Jurado
- Daniel Tovar as Crisóforo "Cris" García
- Alejandro Tommasi as Esteban Arteaga
- Luz María Aguilar as Nany Páramo
- Carmen Becerra as Irasema Huerta
- Mimi Morales as Camila Díaz
- Israel Islas as El Chacal
- Erika García as Genoveva Mendoza
- Clarisa González as Regina Rangel
- Hildeberto Maya as Martín Trejo
- Nicolás Krinis as Cuenca
- Luis Gerardo León as Grimaldi
- Iván Ochoa as Pedro
- León Peraza as Aldo Cisneros
- Pedro Baldo as Clemente Ferrer
- Sergio Goyri as Rutilio Ferrer

== Production ==
In January 2023, it was reported that José Alberto Castro had begun pre-production on his next telenovela. On 7 March 2023, Carolina Miranda and Andrés Palacios were announced in the lead roles, with the working title of the telenovela being La campirana. Filming began on 13 March 2023 in Tlacotalpan, Veracruz. On 28 March 2023, Tierra de esperanza was announced as the official title of the telenovela.

== Episodes ==
No.	Title	Original release date	Mexico viewers (millions)
1	"La dueña de la hacienda"	12 June 2023 (Note: Premiered early online through Las Estrellas website on 9 June 2023.)	3.4
Esteban is arrested for fraud, his daughter María Teresa wants to get him out of jail as she is certain of his innocence. Esteban sends Maria Teresa to the ranch as it is the only chance they have to survive. Valentina sneaks off to Santos' house and kisses him despite Bernarda's disapproval. Adriana remembers when she killed Jerónimo, but made Marco believe that Santos was the culprit. María Teresa arrives at the ranch and is upset that she won't be able to enjoy the privileges she is used to. Upon her refusal to ride a horse, Santos makes María Teresa get home on her own. While walking alone, María Teresa is attacked by three men but Santos arrives and saves her. Valentina finds out that the owner of the ranch has arrived and gets jealous.
2	"Vengo a tomar las riendas de mi hacienda"	13 June 2023	3.5
Santos takes María Teresa to the center of Puerto Bravo, where she meets Marco and Adriana. Rutilio complains to Norma for supporting Clemente with the idea of becoming a painter. Adriana and Marco take María Teresa to the ranch and learn of her plans for her land. Santos begins to hear screams and runs to María Teresa's aid, who is terrified because she has a tarantula on her back. Marco learns that Camila is expecting his child. When Bernarda sees Valentina arguing with María Teresa about Santos, she does not hesitate to insult her, but María Teresa makes it clear that she is the owner of the ranch. Santos and María Teresa take a tour of the ranch. When Marco learns that his men tried to harm María Teresa, he kills them.
3	"Proteger las tierras de quien sea"	14 June 2023	3.2
After fainting, Santos takes María Teresa to his aunt to get a remedy for her. Valentina makes her anger evident at María Teresa's arrival at the ranch. Marco surprises María Teresa with a bouquet of flowers and reiterates that she is not alone, she thanks him for his kindness, but Santos questions his visit. Because of Marco, Jovita's house falls down and Santos tries to save her family, but María Teresa, fearing for him, comes in to rescue him. Rutilio invites Adriana on a date. Valentina complains to Santos about his closeness with María Teresa, he assures her that there is nothing between them. Marco pays Pepe to inform him of everything that happens at María Teresa's ranch. Marco shares with Rutilio his plan to finish with Santos so they can pass the merchandise through the river. Marco visits María Teresa at the ranch, but Santos kicks him out.
4	"Me siento muy atraído por ti"	15 June 2023	3.3
Santos tells María Teresa that Marco cannot be trusted and challenges her to learn the duties of the ranch so that she can command all the employees. Santos teaches María Teresa how to milk a cow, he gets close to her and she assures him that she is not an easy woman. María Teresa visits Marco's ranch and he takes the opportunity to confess his love for her, she thanks him for his sincerity, but tells him that she is engaged. Santos learns that armed men have entered María Teresa's land, she reports them to the authorities. Valentina questions Santos if he is in love with María Teresa, as she has seen them together frequently.
5	"Yo soy el encargado de cuidarla"	16 June 2023	3.0
Marco proposes a plan to Maria Teresa to take care of the river from armed people, she shares it with Santos, but he asks her not to trust him. Remedios, feeling attacked by Adriana, reminds her of the crime she committed. Remedios is a victim of Adriana and Irasema's viciousness, Santos witnesses everything and questions his aunt about the hatred that Adriana has for her. Santos assures María Teresa that he is committed to taking care of the land as well as her. Marco celebrates Camila's loss of her baby, she tells him that someday he will pay for all the damage he caused. Valentina apologizes to her mother, but they argue again because Bernarda wants to force the idea that all men are bad. Santos steals a kiss from María Teresa and she reciprocates.
6	"No pongas tus ojos ahí"	19 June 2023	3.0
María Teresa slaps Santos after he steals a kiss from her. Bernarda leaves a gun for Regina to protect herself from any man and gives her the authorization to shoot him. Esteban learns that the judge has accepted his house arrest. Regina keeps thinking about the boy she met. Santos is arrested for defending a woman from Tomás' harassment. Adriana enters Marco's office to find proof of the plan he is hiding from her. María Teresa learns that Santos is in jail and pays his bail. Valentina is willing to learn more about Clemente, but Regina asks her not to. Maria Teresa does not want to hear reasons about Santos' fight. Santos confesses to his aunt Remedios that he has strong feelings for María Teresa. Aldo surprises María Teresa at the ranch and kisses her in front of Santos.
7	"Al que se confía le va mal"	20 June 2023	3.2
Aldo assures María Teresa that Santos has a bad attitude, she defends him. Santos is saddened to learn that María Teresa is engaged and confirms that he should not have gotten his hopes up with her. Adriana tells Irasema that she will find a way to make all the women in town hate María Teresa. Marco visits María Teresa and makes her believe that Santos is a dangerous man and advises her to kick him out of the ranch. Adriana warns Marco that if she finds out he is getting more money she will not forgive him. Valentina surprises Santos in the river and steals a kiss from him.
8	"En este lugar mando yo"	21 June 2023	3.1
During dinner, Adriana gives Aldo an uncomfortable moment when she learns that he was one of María Teresa's employees. Aldo tries to seduce María Teresa but she rejects him. Remedios notices that Santos is sad about María Teresa's engagement. María Teresa realizes that Santos is jealous, she questions him, but he denies it. Adriana questions Rutilio about the business he has with Marco. Aldo asks María Teresa not to trust Santos, she refuses to fire him just because of what Marco and Trejo say about him. Regina believes that Clemente is dangerous, but Valentina asks her not to lose hope. Marco reveals to Aldo the reasons why he hates Santos.
9	"No voy a vender estas tierras"	22 June 2023	3.1
Santos tries to flirt with María Teresa and manages to make her nervous. Aldo lets María Teresa know that Santos is a murderer, she cannot believe the news and assures him that he is good. Aldo proposes to María Teresa to sell the ranch, she refuses since her mother inherited the land. Marco plans to kill Santos in order to cross his merchandise. Valentina reveals to Santos that she feels very lucky to have him in her life, she tries to sleep with him, but is rejected. Santos assures María Teresa that he is not a murderer and reveals how things happened with Marco's father. Santos gets upset with María Teresa for her distrust, Valentina seeing him angry, gives him a kiss, but they are seen by María Teresa.
10	"Tiren a matar"	23 June 2023	3.3
Marco reveals to Rutilio that he knows where he is going to bury Santos. María Teresa plans to cut the budget of the ranch, but Santos tells her that she will be the only one who benefits from this. Marco has everything ready to transport his merchandise. Marco's men enter La Esperanza and start shooting, Santos prepares to confront them. Valentina is in danger. Clemente takes care of Regina and finds out that she is deaf. Santos manages to defend María Teresa's land but faints.
11	"Me moría de miedo de perderte"	26 June 2023	2.8
María Teresa fears that Santos will not survive the attack. María Teresa confronts Rutilio about what happened at her ranch. María Teresa fears that the situation she is currently living in La Esperanza will force her to sell it, she tells Bernarda that it was a mistake to have come to the ranch. Maria Teresa unburdens herself with Marco and tells him that if things are not solved in the ranch, she will try to sell it. Santos visits María Teresa to comfort her, she thanks him for his courage to protect the ranch.
12	"Vamos a hacer justicia"	27 June 2023	3.1
Valentina tells Santos that some men tried to touch her without her consent when he was defending La Esperanza. Marco offers his help to María Teresa, Santos interrupts them and when they are left alone, Marco warns him to stay out of his business. Santos learns that María Teresa wants to sell the ranch and tries to convince her to continue fighting for her patrimony. Marco asks Adriana to get closer to María Teresa, but she is suspicious of the coincidence between the attack on the ranch and his departure. Santos surprises María Teresa by gathering the employees with offerings of valuable objects so that together, they can save the ranch.
13	"¿Tiene miedo de pasar la noche conmigo?"	28 June 2023	3.0
Unable to sell her merchandise in town, María Teresa decides to take advantage of Santos' charm to promote them in nearby towns. Valentina complains to Bernarda for not letting her go to sell and fears that the friendship between Santos and María Teresa will end in something else. Marco fulfills the agreement with Rutilio and delivers the man who tried to attack Maria Teresa. Unable to find another room at the inn, María Teresa and Santos are forced to stay together and share a bed.
14	"Ir en contra de la ley"	29 June 2023	2.9
María Teresa thanks Santos for everything he has done for her and the two share a moment. Santos comments to Valentina that he had to spend the night with María Teresa, Valentina is upset to think that there is something going on between the two of them. María Teresa goes the police station to identify the man who tried to harm her the day they entered the ranch. Rutilio tells María Teresa that Santos has yet to testify and his disappearance has made him a suspect. María Teresa tries to defend Santos against Commander Trejo's order, but Trejo pushes her, provoking Santos' fury.
15	"Lo trae en la sangre"	30 June 2023	2.9
Santos warns Clemente to be careful with Bernarda, as she is willing to do anything to protect her daughters. Santos tells María Teresa that everyone will have to work to move the ranch forward. Mr. Teo warns Santos and María Teresa that the whole town has already found out about their dirty business and no one wants to get involved with the ranch. Aldo visits Esteban to report on his investigation, but when Esteban tries to get up, he faints. Pedro returns to the ranch and informs Santos that his truck was stolen.
16	"Nada de lo que hago es suficiente"	3 July 2023	2.8
Upon learning of the theft, Santos decides to visit Danilo to try to explain that the situation has gotten out of hand. Chacal visits Marco to give him the payment for the sale of the stolen products. Upon learning that Esteban is in poor health, Bernarda desperately tries to contact him. Marco makes fun of the situation that the ranch is facing and Santos confronts him to prevent the other workers from losing faith. María Teresa tries to apply for a loan to save the ranch, but due to her father's mismanagement, she cannot apply for a loan.
17	"¿Qué está pasando entre el capataz y tú?"	4 July 2023	2.8
Remedios visits Delfino to settle Santos' debt and confronts him for doubting her nephew's word. María Teresa looks for Fabiola to propose a new business with which she assures she will save the ranch. Aldo gets fed up with María Teresa always defending Santos and asks her if she is being unfaithful to him. Marco demands Rutilio to organize a new route to transport Grimaldi's orders, as he makes him a lucrative business proposal. Santos is happy to see María Teresa again, as he claims that the flight almost cost him his life.
18	"Ya no eres la misma"	5 July 2023	2.8
María Teresa takes Santos to buy more suitable clothes for the meeting and is surprised to see the result of the change. Regina is confused to see Bernarda holding hands with Marco and questions her about it. Regina is afraid to go out with Clemente, as she doesn't know how they will communicate, but Valentina recommends her to follow her heart. Adriana knows that by helping Marco in his pursuit of María Teresa, sooner or later he will forget about the ranch, allowing her to keep the property. Aldo complains to María Teresa for rejecting him intimately, she gets fed up with his jealousy and asks him to end their engagement.
19	"¿Y si Marco es nuestro papá?"	6 July 2023	3.0
Regina realizes that Bernarda changes every time she is near Marco and shares with Valentina her concern that he is their father. Santos swears to María Teresa that he will do whatever it takes to make her always smile. Rutilio corners Bernarda proclaiming his desire, but she stops him. Regina manages to sneak out to have her first date with Clemente; despite the language barrier, they manage to understand each other. Adriana thanks Rutilio for his help with her request and tells him that she is looking for more than friendship with him.
20	"¡No quiero que te vayas!"	7 July 2023	3.1
María Teresa and Santos celebrate the signing of the contract and when they return home, they kiss. María Teresa and Santos enjoy breakfast, but Valentina's call upsets María Teresa when she remembers that Santos will not stop being a womanizer. Adriana and Irasema run into Grimaldi, who recognizes them under another name; they fear that their secret will be exposed and pretend not to know him. María Teresa decides to put her apartment up for sale to save the ranch. Santos warns Maria Teresa that Marco has more than one interest in her and she realizes that he is jealous.
21	"¿Por qué no te quedas esta noche conmigo?"	10 July 2023	3.0
Bernarda manages to talk to Esteban and is happy to hear that he is in better health. María Teresa and Santos enjoy an evening alone and sleep together. Camila asks for Remedios' help to expose Marco and make him pay for the death of her baby. Seeing that Clemente left no message for Regina, Valentina convinces her to write to him first to let him know how she feels. Before boarding the plane back to Puerto Bravo, Santos remembers María Teresa's words and realizes that he doesn't want to be separated from her either, because for the first time in his life, he is in love.
22	"El amor está enfrente de nosotros"	11 July 2023	3.0
Adriana asks Rutilio to take care of the new people who have arrived in town, and to investigate Remedios and her scams. Rutilio tries to seduce Norma, but she rejects him; the next day she complains about his infidelities. Remedios warns Santos that his relationship with María Teresa may be destined to fail since they live in different worlds. Santos returns to La Esperanza and Valentina finds out that he spent the night with María Teresa. Santos discusses with Bernarda his suspicions that Marco is interested in María Teresa. Bernarda is disappointed to realize that Marco has only been using her.
23	"Apostar todo"	12 July 2023	2.8
Clemente looks for the file on Jerónimo's death to calm the gossip that blames Santos and Remedios for the murder. Aldo apologizes to María Teresa for their last argument and begs her to reconsider their relationship. Grimaldi shows up at La Soledad looking for Adriana on Rutilio's orders, she is surprised to see him at her house. Santos tries to explain to María Teresa about his encounter with another woman, but she doesn't want to see him.
24	"Usted no sabe ser hombre de una mujer"	13 July 2023	3.0
Santos tries to confess his feelings to María Teresa, but she asks him to limit himself to talking only about work. Santos organizes a surprise dinner for María Teresa to tell her that he loves her. Adriana asks Rutilio to be careful with Grimaldi and tries to kiss him, but a jealous Norma interrupts them. Aldo is determined to move to the ranch to regain María Teresa's love. Santos regrets having missed his chance to confess to María Teresa how he feels about her.
25	"Me rompieron el corazón"	14 July 2023	2.9
Unaware that his daughter broke off her engagement, Esteban vows to do everything to make María Teresa marry Aldo. Aldo confronts Santos about the night he spent with María Teresa. Santos feels used when he realizes that the night he spent with María Teresa meant nothing to her. Santos kisses Valentina when he learns of her admiration. Santos will not allow María Teresa to marry Aldo without first fighting for her love.
26	"¿Quieres ser mi novia?"	17 July 2023	2.7
Aldo tells Santos that María Teresa needs to surround herself with people at her level and not just any man. After the discussion with Aldo, Santos agrees to a date with Valentina and asks her to be his girlfriend. Marco is convinced that the only one excited about a wedding is Aldo and not María Teresa, so he wants to win her over at all costs. María Teresa walks through the ranch and is surprised to see Santos kissing Valentina.
27	"Una tierra que no tiene ley"	18 July 2023	2.8
Marco insists on having María Teresa's land in his possession. Rutilio tries to take advantage of Bernarda, but she defends herself against his behavior. Santos seeks Bernarda's approval of his relationship with Valentina, but she objects. Bernarda informs Valentina that she does not agree with her relationship with Santos. Valentina does not want to be separated from Santos and leaves the house despite her mother's threats.
28	"¡Vamos a casarnos ya!"	19 July 2023	2.6
Santos confronts Bernarda about her distrust of men and she confesses the pain they have caused her. Aldo asks María Teresa to set a date for their wedding, she agrees to a civil marriage as soon as they deliver the first order. After the conversation with Bernarda, Valentina comes to the conclusion that her father may have assaulted her mother. Santos tells María Teresa that the new machinery has arrived and Aldo surprises him with the news that they will get married when they travel to the city. Valentina surprises Santos with the news that Bernarda has finally approved of their relationship.
29	"¿Estás segura de que te quieres casar?"	20 July 2023	3.0
Rutilio surprises Norma with romantic details so that she won't ask for a divorce. Santos confronts María Teresa about her marriage to Aldo and sows doubts about whether it is really what she wants. Santos fears not solving the problem the cows have and risking everything María Teresa has sacrificed so much for. Irasema confesses to Adriana that they most likely killed the man they sedated years ago and for that reason she is wanted by the police. María Teresa confesses to Nany her reasons for marrying Aldo, but in reality her heart belongs to Santos.
30	"Una boda arruinada"	21 July 2023	2.7
Irasema insinuates that Adriana had already killed someone before, Adriana threatens her not to say that again. Santos confesses to Remedios that he only accepted Valentina to fill the void left by María Teresa. The police interrupt María Teresa's wedding to arrest Aldo as he is accused of fraud. Santos surprises Valentina by announcing in front of all the ranch workers that they are officially dating. Santos learns that María Teresa did not marry Aldo and is happy with the news even though he is with Valentina.
31	"Es el fin para todos"	24 July 2023	2.6
Marco takes advantage of María Teresa's sadness to show his interest and eventually, make her fall in love. María Teresa is furious when she confirms that Aldo is behind the fraud against her father's company and slaps him for betraying her and her father. Seeing María Teresa's problems, Marco offers her his entire production to deliver the outstanding order, and assures her that her employees are not taking care of her ranch.
32	"Vamos a salvar a La Esperanza"	25 July 2023	2.8
Marco complains to Santos for failing María Teresa and warns him that his ranch will take care of the order. Marco encourages María Teresa and assures her that things will change from now on. Santos confronts María Teresa to find out if the night they spent together meant the same to her. Valentina learns that María Teresa did not get married and fears losing Santos.
33	"Las cosas caen por su propio peso"	26 July 2023	2.8
To guarantee payment of the debt, María Teresa gives Marco the deeds to the ranch 'La Esperanza'. Marco confesses to Bernarda that he is helping María Teresa to benefit her and will not give up until he regains her love. Valentina defends Santos from María Teresa's complaints, not knowing all the sacrifices she made for the ranch. Santos warns María Teresa that the misfortunes at the ranch have been provoked and swears that he will always look after her interests. Regina and Clemente meet in town, where he thanks her for showing him love and surprises her with a kiss.
34	"Inspección de sanidad"	27 July 2023	2.9
Regina agrees to be Clemente's girlfriend, but she asks him to keep things hidden while they get Bernarda to give them permission. Marco surprises María Teresa with a bouquet of flowers to brighten her day. Valentina tells Regina about seeing Marco with another woman and assures her that he is to blame for Bernarda's unhappiness. Rutilio warns María Teresa to stay out of trouble or he could easily have the ranch closed down. Bernarda and her daughters run into Rutilio at the ranch and she threatens him to stay away from them; Bernarda confesses to Valentina that he is the man who hurt her.
35	"Yo me sé cuidar sola"	28 July 2023	2.8
María Teresa finds out that Rutilio was the one who ordered the inspection of La esperanza to close it down. Clemente shares with Regina that he has found a way for her to hear, but she rejects him knowing that Bernarda will not authorize it. Seeing the way Santos defends María Teresa, Valentina feels jealous and suspects that something happened between the two of them on their trip to the city. Valentina questions Rutilio about his attack on Bernarda and to find out if he is her father, but Clemente interrupts them.
36	"Tú no tienes que ensuciarte las manos"	31 July 2023	2.9
Knowing that Rutilio attacked her mother, Valentina can't stand the idea that he could be her father; she explains to Regina the situation asks her to stay away from Clemente. Santos learns that María Teresa's wedding was cancelled because of Aldo's apprehension and is upset to think that she would have gone through with her engagement. Marco complains to María Teresa for working in the fields and tries to humiliate Santos, but she puts a stop to him and explains that she enjoys collaborating with her employees. María Teresa confesses to Santos that she did not want to marry Aldo, as her heart belongs to him.
37	"Es mejor no pensar en el hubiera"	1 August 2023	2.9
Maria Teresa is glad that Santos has found a woman like Valentina and asks him not to make sudden changes after his confession of love. Remedios asks Santos to be careful not to hurt Valentina. Ernesto offers María Teresa a considerable sum to renovate La Esperanza, but prefers to use it to pay off the debt to Marco. Santos receives word that the ranch is free of plague. Regina blames Valentina for separating her from Clemente and assures her that she will fight for his love. Norma wants to talk to Bernarda about Regina and the reason why Valentina demanded Clemente to stay away from her.
38	"Nos estamos dejando llevar por la pasión"	2 August 2023	2.6
Bernarda complains to Regina for hiding her relationship with Clemente, Regina takes the opportunity to question her about the identity of her father. Valentina deduces that she is Rutilio's daughter and suffers when she realizes that she is the daughter of her mother's attacker. Marco assures Bernarda that his help to La Esperanza has been for her and they sleep together. Valentina wakes up and finds a letter from Regina, when she gives it to Bernarda they realize that she ran away to be with Clemente.
39	"Es momento de que se sepa la verdad"	3 August 2023	2.8
Clemente confronts Bernarda to defend his relationship with Regina, but Bernarda confesses in front of the whole town why she cannot trust him. Clemente confronts Rutilio for hurting Bernarda and rejects him as his father. Adriana tempts Regina and Valentina with the opportunity of an independent life on her ranch with the intention of sending them to work with Grimaldi. Clemente reveals to Norma Rutilio's actions and his decision to make a life away from him.
40	"Todo esto va a ser mío"	4 August 2023	2.7
Esteban asks María Teresa to open her heart and allow herself to be happy again. Marco confesses to María Teresa his admiration and tries to seduce her with a kiss. Marco warns Santos that soon María Teresa will be his and with her, the ranch. María Teresa looks for Santos with the intention of talking business, but finds Valentina preparing a surprise for him. María Teresa suffers for seeing Santos happy with Valentina and decides to forget her feelings for him.
41	"Un clavo que saca otro clavo"	7 August 2023	2.7
Esteban runs into Valentina and when he learns that she is Bernarda's daughter, he is happy to finally meet her. Marco asks María Teresa for a chance to make her happy. Rutilio throws in María Teresa's face the favor he did her by not closing the ranch La Esperanza. Esteban meets an unknown woman who claims to have been held captive on the other side of the river. Regina visits Adriana's ranch and asks her for a job to improve her life.
42	"Mi matrimonio terminó por culpa tuya"	8 August 2023	2.6
Esteban demands that Rutilio investigate why there are people using the river for illicit purposes. Bernarda complains to Marco for cheating on her with María Teresa and warns him that the love she felt for him ended a long time ago. Clemente says goodbye to Regina to go to the city to start a new life and tells her that someday he will return for her. Marco kisses María Teresa in front of Santos, he gets jealous.
43	"El padre de Valentina eres tú"	9 August 2023	2.8
Rodrigo visits Rutilio to review his work thanks to the complaints imposed by Esteban. María Teresa thanks the support of all her team to move La Esperanza forward. Maria Teresa tells Santos her intention to fall in love with Marco and asks him to forget what happened in the city. Valentina questions Esteban about Bernarda, he advises her to be patient with her. Esteban asks Bernarda to talk to Valentina about her father, she confesses to him that he is Valentina's father.
44	"Hoy truena Santos"	10 August 2023	2.8
Esteban complains to Bernarda for having kept her secret for so long. María Teresa manages to settle the debt with Marco and asks him to return the deeds to La Esperanza, thus ruining his plans. Marco decides it is time to get rid of Santos to continue doing business with Grimaldi. Chacal provokes Santos by making insinuations about María Teresa's reputation, he confronts him with the intention of defending her. María Teresa does not believe Santos' accusations against Marco and decides it is best for him to leave La Esperanza before he gets into more trouble.
45	"No debería echarse a ese tipo como enemigo"	11 August 2023	2.7
María Teresa does not want to say goodbye to Santos and her pride does not allow her to apologize to him. Valentina refuses to separate from Santos and proposes to leave the ranch with him. Santos tells Esteban that he is in love with María Teresa even though he is in a relationship with Valentina. Marco tells Grimaldi that his partnership with Rutilio is over, Grimaldi warns him that Rutilio could be a dangerous enemy. Esteban confronts Rutilio for his frauds and for assaulting Bernarda, soon after, he is attacked and dies.
46	"¡Yo soy inocente!"	14 August 2023	2.7
María Teresa begins to worry about her father when he doesn't return for dinner and asks her employees to look for him. Trejo finds Esteban's body in Santos' truck and arrests him for being the culprit of his death. Rutilio insinuates that he knows that Marco is the real culprit in Esteban's death, as the events could not have come at a better time. María Teresa goes to the police station and confirms her father's death. María Teresa confronts Santos about her father's murder, he assures her that he is innocent.
47	"Eres lo único que le queda"	15 August 2023	3.1
María Teresa threatens to make Santos pay for her father's death if he is found to be the murderer. Remedios asks for support from the capital's police to prove Santos' innocence. Adriana suspects that Marco is behind Esteban's death, assuring that he is the only thing Maria Teresa has left. Valentina offers her condolences to Maria Teresa and Marco calls her out on her cynicism, assuring in front of everyone that Santos is to blame for Esteban's death. Valentina asks Rutilio as a favor from a daughter, to help her prove Santos' innocence, he makes it clear that he is not her father.
48	"¿Me comprarías mi esperanza?"	16 August 2023	3.2
Remedios promises Santos that she will prove his innocence. Valentina tries to make María Teresa understand that Santos is innocent, but Marco prevents her from listening to further explanations. Marco learns that Camila testified on Santos' behalf and warns her to keep quiet or she could be linked as an accomplice to the crime. María Teresa cannot bear the pain of staying in the ranch and considers the option of selling it. Mr. Villalobos warns María Teresa about the latest change in Esteban's will, in which he leaves almost half of his assets to Valentina.
49	"Duda razonable"	17 August 2023	3.3
Rutilio confronts Clemente for testifying on Santos' behalf and threatens to reprimand him unless he keeps quiet. Thanks to Marco's interference, the workers confront María Teresa demanding answers about who will be in charge of the land. Rodrigo proves that the evidence against Santos does not match the crime and demands that Rutilio release him. Rutilio is upset at Trejo for accepting the statements in favor of Santos. Santos learns that Marco took charge of La Esperanza with the consent of María Teresa and complains to her for distrusting his innocence.
50	"¡Esto cambia todo!"	18 August 2023	3.3
María Teresa regrets having doubted Santos for which she apologizes, but he rejects her. María Teresa confronts Valentina to know the reason why Esteban inherited half of his fortune to her and Bernarda clarifies that they are sisters. María Teresa is disappointed to learn that Valentina is her sister, because now it is impossible to love Santos. Marco comments that he feels reassured to see Santos behind bars, but María Teresa defends his innocence. Upon learning that Valentina is María Teresa's sister, Santos decides to confess his love for María Teresa and ends his relationship with Valentina.
51	"Hablar de mujer a mujer"	21 August 2023	3.2
Regina tells Bernarda that Clemente has found a medical procedure for her to be able to hear, Bernarda agrees to the surgery but without the help of the Ferrer family. María Teresa complains to Rutilio for not doing his job well and warns him that she will take advantage of her father's contacts in the government to investigate his administration. Marco complains to Bernarda for getting involved with Esteban and assures her that his father was right when he called her a gold digger. Rutilio complains to Norma for interfering in Santos' trial and implies that he knew he was innocent from the beginning. Valentina takes advantage of the newly equal position with María Teresa to ask her for answers about her feelings for Santos.
52	"Yo no soy tu madre biológica"	22 August 2023	3.1
María Teresa asks Valentina to forget about Santos to focus on building a sisterly relationship, but Valentina rejects her because of the pain she represents. Marco pressures María Teresa to sell La Esperanza but she rejects the idea. Bernarda confesses to Regina that she is not her biological mother. Remedios learns that Adriana is involved in human trafficking and warns her that she will find a way to denounce her for this and the death of her husband. Valentina makes clear to Marco his true place within La Esperanza as well as Santos' efforts to keep the ranch going over the years.
53	"Esto se acabó"	23 August 2023	3.3
Norma confronts Rutilio and Adriana for their betrayal. María Teresa decides to respect Esteban's last will and gives Bernarda the documents that guarantee that the house belongs to her, and recognizes Valentina as his heir. Valentina decides to use Esteban's inheritance in Regina's operation. Marco comments with Rutilio his suspicion that Bernarda is behind Esteban's death, because being Valentina his daughter, she has more to gain. María Teresa follows Valentina's recommendations and decides to terminate her working relationship with Marco and asks him to remove his employees from La Esperanza.
54	"Ojo por ojo"	24 August 2023	3.1
Remedios and Norma file a complaint against Adriana and Grimaldi, Trejo stops the process arguing that only the victim can file it. Cris convinces Susi to continue with the complaint, but El Chacal intercepts them, Cris stays to stop him and is injured. Santos finds Cris and takes him to Remedios to treat his wounds. Santos warns María Teresa that Marco is the one who has been crossing the river to send women to the border to work in the brothel. Marco refuses to lose María Teresa and decides to kill Santos, Valentina sees him and intervenes, saving his life.
55	"Valentina está muerta"	25 August 2023	3.5
Finding no help for Valentina, Santos decides to take her to Remedios' house, but she dies in his arms. Bernarda learns of Valentina's death and vows to get justice is done one way or another. María Teresa assures that El Chacal had something to do with Valentina's death after attacking Cris, but Marco's defense makes her suspect him. Rutilio visits Adriana after learning her true identity and assures her that things will change between them. Rutilio and Adriana decide to team up to carry out Grimaldi's business, but first they must get rid of Marco.
56	"Nunca he dejado de sentir algo por usted"	28 August 2023	3.6
Clemente thanks Bernarda for allowing him to be with Regina despite not accepting the relationship. Clemente suspects that everything bad that happens in La Esperanza is motivated by the border and that Rutilio could be behind it all. María Teresa thinks about the promise she made to Valentina before she died and admits she is afraid of not being able to make Santos happy. Norma confesses to Bernarda that she is aware of all of Rutilio's misdeeds and reiterates her support to put an end to him. María Teresa confesses to Santos that the real reason she broke up with Marco is because of the love she feels for him.
57	"Muerto el perro se acabó la rabia"	29 August 2023	3.4
Rutilio arrests Grimaldi and defends Adriana, arguing that she is also a victim, having been hired under false pretenses. After undergoing surgery, the doctor helps Regina hear for the first time. Clemente and Trejo warn María Teresa that someone close to her could be behind everything bad that has happened at La Esperanza. Remedios tries to settle once and for all the rivalry between Marco and Santos, so she unmasks Adriana as Marco's real murderer. Marco confronts Adriana for having killed his father to collect the inheritance and decides to murder her.
58	"Me voy de La Esperanza"	30 August 2023	3.6
Marco kills Adriana and decides to do justice by taking her body to the same place where she threw his father. Concerned for Bernarda's peace, Clemente vows to do everything to find and unmask the person responsible for Valentina's death. María Teresa confronts Marco about Santos' accusations and he attacks her; Santos arrives to save her. The board of directors informs María Teresa that after Esteban's death, the time has come for her to return to the capital to run the company. María Teresa discusses with Santos her decision to leave La Esperanza, and realizing that he could lose her forever, Santos confesses his love for her.
59	"Vas a pagar por lo que hiciste"	31 August 2023	3.7
María Teresa reaffirms her love for Santos and agrees to stay in Puerto Bravo to form a life together. Camila learns of Valentina's death and confesses to Clemente that she saw Marco armed the day of the tragedy. Pepe confesses to Santos and María Teresa that he helped Marco in his attacks against La Esperanza; she gets tired of waiting for justice by confirming his guilt in Valentina's death. María Teresa confronts Marco for interfering with La Esperanza; he tries to clear his conscience by freeing himself of all guilt. Bernarda confronts Marco for Valentina's death, he confesses that it was an accident and tries to flee.
60	"Una vida llena de amor"	1 September 2023	3.6
Marco tries to run over Bernarda, but dies when she shoots him. María Teresa and Santos defend Bernarda, arguing that it was self-defense. Rutilio confesses to Bernarda his guilt in Esteban's death and tries to fabricate evidence against her. Impatient to spend the rest of his life with María Teresa, Santos asks her to marry him; she accepts. Rutilio is transferred to the capital where he will be tried and imprisoned for all his crimes. María Teresa and Santos get married accompanied by family and friends.

== Reception ==
=== Ratings ===
Viewership and ratings per season of Tierra de esperanza
Season	Timeslot (CT)	Episodes	First aired		Last aired		Avg. viewers (millions)
Season	Timeslot (CT)	Episodes	Date	Viewers (millions)	Date	Viewers (millions)	Avg. viewers (millions)
1	Mon–Fri 9:30 p.m.	60	12 June 2023	3.4	1 September 2023	3.6	3.02

=== Awards and nominations ===
Year	Award	Category	Nominated	Result	Ref
2024	Produ Awards	Best Short Telenovela	Tierra de esperanza	Nominated	
2024	Produ Awards	Best Lead Actress - Short Telenovela	Carolina Miranda	Nominated	
2024	Produ Awards	Best Lead Actor - Short Telenovela	Andrés Palacios	Nominated	
