= José Alberto Castro =

Mexican producer and director

- Born: José Alberto Sáinz Castro; 31 May 1963 (age 62); Mexico City, Mexico
- Other names: El Güero
- Occupations: Producer, director
- Years active: 1984 – present
- Spouse: Angélica Rivera (m. 1994; div. 2008)
- Partner: Nadia Rowinsky (2008–2009) Angelique Boyer (2011–2014)
- Children: 3 (including Angélica Sofía)
- Relatives: Verónica Castro (sister); Cristian Castro (nephew)

José Alberto Castro (born José Alberto Sáinz Castro, 31 May 1963) is a Mexican producer and director.

== Biography ==
He is the brother of actresses Verónica Castro, Beatriz Castro, telenovela producer Fausto Gerardo Sáinz, and the uncle of Mexican singer Cristian Castro. He began his career in the production crew in the telenovela Mi pequeña Soledad.

He was married to Angélica Rivera from 1994–2008; the couple had three daughters. The couple divorced in 2008, and their marriage was annulled by the Catholic Church.

He worked as a producer of variety shows presented by Verónica Castro, such as the La movida (1991), Vero América va! (1992), En la noche (1994) and La tocada (1996).

In 1993 debut as executive producer of telenovelas in Valentina starring Verónica Castro, Juan Ferrara and Rafael Rojas.

== Filmography ==
Executive Producer, Production Manager, Documentary, Programs
Year	Title	Notes
1988	Mala noche no	Programs
1990	Mi pequeña Soledad	Production Manager
1991	La movida	Programs
1992	Y Vero América va!	Programs
1993	Furia musical	Programs
1993-1994	Valentina	Executive Producer
1994	En la noche	Programs
1995-1996	Acapulco, cuerpo y alma	Executive Producer
1996	La tocada	Programs
1996	Sentimientos Ajenos	Executive Producer
1997	Pueblo chico, infierno grande	Executive Producer
1998-1999	Ángela	Executive Producer
1999	Serafín	Executive Producer
1999-2000	Humor es... los Comediantes	Programs
2001	El tal Chou del once	Programs
2001	Sin pecado concebido	Executive Producer
2004	Rubí	Executive Producer
2005	Celebremos México: Hecho en México	Documentary
2006	Del otro lado	Documentary
2006–2007	Código Postal	Executive Producer
2007	Jefe de jefes	Documentary
2007–2008	Palabra de mujer	Executive Producer
2009–2010	Los exitosos Pérez	Executive Producer
2010–2011	Teresa	Executive Producer
2011–2012	La que no podía amar	Executive Producer
2012–2023	Corona de Lágrimas	Executive Producer
2014	La Malquerida	Executive Producer
2015–2016	Pasíon y poder	Executive Producer
2016–2017	Vino el amor	Executive Producer
2018–2019	Por amar sin ley	Executive Producer
2019–2020	Medicos linea de vida	Executive Producer
2021	La desalmada	Executive Producer
2022-2023	Cabo	Executive Producer
2023	Tierra de esperanza	Executive Producer
2023	El maleficio	Executive Producer
2024-2025	Las hijas de la señora García	Executive Producer
2025	Los hilos del pasado	Executive Producer
2026	Tierra de amor y coraje	Executive Producer

== Awards and nominations ==
=== Premios TVyNovelas ===
Year	Category	Telenovela	Result
1997	Best Telenovela of the Year	Sentimientos Ajenos	Nominated
2000	Best Special Production	Serafín	Won
2002	Best Telenovela of the Year	Sin pecado concebido	Nominated
2005	Best Telenovela of the Year	Rubí	Won
2011	Best Telenovela of the Year	Teresa	Nominated
2012	Best Telenovela of the Year	La que no podía amar	Nominated
2013	Best Telenovela of the Year	Corona de Lágrimas	Nominated
2016	Best Telenovela of the Year	Pasión y poder	Won
2017	Best Telenovela of the Year	Vino El Amor	Nominated

=== Premios People en Español ===
Year	Category	Telenovela	Result
2011	Best Telenovela	Teresa	Nominated
2012	Best Telenovela	La que no podía amar	Won
