= Luciano Zacharski =

Argentine actor

- Born: December 17, 1985 (age 39); Buenos Aires, Argentina
- Occupation: Actor
- Years active: 2011-present

Luciano Zacharski (born December 17, 1985, in Buenos Aires, Argentina), is an Argentine actor, currently resides in Mexico City, Mexico.

== Career ==
In 2010 he joined in the "Centro de Formación Actoral de TV Azteca". He has had several characters in the series Lo que callamos las mujeres, and has participated in several telenovelas such as Cielo rojo, Quererte así, Vivir a destiempo and Siempre tuya Acapulco. In 2014 to 2015, he recorded the telenovela Así en el barrio como en el cielo which is his first starring role on television and plays Octavio Ferrara.

== Filmography ==
=== Television ===
Year	Title	Role	Notes
2011	Cielo rojo	Álvaro Robledo	Recurring role
2012	Quererte así	Julián Valdés	Recurring role
2013	Vivir a destiempo	Eduardo Monroy	Recurring role
2014	Siempre tuya Acapulco	Jesús "Chuy" Pérez	Recurring role
2015	Así en el barrio como en el cielo	Octavio Ferrara	Lead role
2016–17	Vino el amor	Carlos	Recurring role
