= Parientes a la fuerza =

American telenovela

- Genre: Telenovela
- Created by: Sebastián Ortega
- Written by: Rosa Clemente; Raúl Prieto
- Directed by: Gustavo Loza; Danny Gavidia; Felipe Aguilar; Bernardo Mota
- Starring: Bárbara de Regil; Guy Ecker; Michel Duval; Chantal Andere; Carmen Aub; Lisa Owen
- Theme music composer: Jordi Bachbush
- Opening theme: "Parientes a la fuerza" by Andrea Basef
- Composer: Jordi Bachbush
- Country of origin: United States
- Original language: Spanish
- No. of seasons: 1
- No. of episodes: 100

Production
- Executive producers: Juancho Cardona; Manolo Cardona; Andrea Salas; Karen Barroeta; Marcos Santana
- Producer: Mariana Zubillaga
- Editor: Javier Campos López
- Production companies: 11:11 Films & TV; Telemundo Global Studios

Original release
- Network: Telemundo
- Release: 26 October 2021 – 21 March 2022

Parientes a la fuerza (English: Family by Force) is an American telenovela that aired on Telemundo from 26 October 2021 to 21 March 2022. The series is produced by 11:11 Films & TV for Telemundo. It stars Bárbara de Regil, Guy Ecker, Michel Duval, and Chantal Andere.

== Plot ==
George Cruz is a 50 year old Hollywood screenwriter who is suffering a midlife crisis under the shadow of his only success, the death of his mother, and his wife, Leticia, cheating on him. His frustration, loneliness, and feeling like a failure take him to Mexico where he meets Carmen Jurado, a Mexican singer that turns into his muse, artist, and great love. George regains his inspiration and happiness that make him feel alive.

== Cast ==
=== Main ===
- Bárbara de Regil as Carmen Jurado
- Guy Ecker as George Cruz
- Michel Duval as Andy Cruz
- Chantal Andere as Leticia Sanz
- Carmen Aub as Clío Bonnet
- Lisa Owen as Margarita Hernández de Jurado
- Antonio de la Vega as Robert Ferguson
- Salvador Zerboni as Juancho Hernández
- Macaria as Mamá Rosa
- Alejandro Ávila as Tenoch Cruz
- Sofía Garza as Yuliana Hernández
- Mauricio Garza as Tomás
- Roberta Damián as Paz Cruz
- Patricia Martínez as María Cruz
- Daniel Raymont as Kurt
- Ana Pau Castell as Lara Jurado
- Elsy Reyes as Tania
- Gustavo Egelhaaf as Emiliano
- Enoc Leaño as Aristides
- Luca Valentini as Rocco Cruz
- Toño Valdés as Pedro Cruz
- Verónica Montes as Sharpay
- Angely Gaviria as Gina
- Victor Jiménez as Don
- Fermín Martínez as Aurelio Ruiz
- Rodolfo Valdés as Rick Jones
- Juan Vidal as Wesley
- Nancy Taira as Sofía
- Tomás Rojas as Camilo Bustillo

=== Recurring ===
- Nashla Aguilar as Lulú
- Leonardo Álvarez as Alan Davila
- Iker García as Cameron
- Diana Quijano as Michelle Bonnet
- Ernesto Álvarez as Macario
- Hamlet Ramírez
- Miguel Islas as Pepe

== Reception ==
=== Ratings ===
The series premiered with a total of 999,000 viewers. The series was pulled from Telemundo's prime time schedule after thirteen episodes due to low ratings. On 15 November 2021 the series moved to the late night timeslot of 12am/11c.

=== Awards and nominations ===
Year	Award	Category	Nominated	Result	Ref
2022	Produ Awards	Best Music Theme - Superseries or Telenovela	Parientes a la fuerza	Nominated	
2022	Produ Awards	Best Music Composer	Jordi Bachbush	Nominated	

== Episodes ==
No.	Title	Original release date	U.S. viewers (millions)
1	"Una nueva oportunidad"	26 October 2021	0.99
George Cruz's life seems to be falling apart, but when he travels to Mexico on a special mission, he meets Carmen Jurado, a young singer who fills him with hope, and her family.
2	"Un amor complicado"	27 October 2021	0.95
Carmen and George start a new life, but problems are not long in coming, Tania seeks to displace her. Andy meets the woman of his dreams, he doesn't know that she is engaged.
3	"Familia"	28 October 2021	0.94
An unexpected visit abruptly changes things, George welcomes a new opportunity for Carmen to accept his marriage proposal. Leticia causes an awkward situation.
4	"Todos juntos"	29 October 2021	0.75
Carmen wants to make peace, but discovers that there will be more people at home. The Jurado's and the Cruz's will have to share space, Leticia declares war. George puts Tania in her place.
5	"La arpía"	1 November 2021	0.85
Carmen and her family prepare a surprise for George. Andy can't say no to a sincere proposal, his escape will be to look for Clío.
6	"Cuentas claras"	2 November 2021	0.77
George and Carmen announce that they are moving up the wedding date, Margarita takes measures to protect her daughter. Juancho confesses why the family cannot return to Mexico.
7	"Mala jugada"	3 November 2021	0.79
Carmen tells George what her uncle Juancho did, they manage to prevent the family from finding out. Pedro rescues his sister, but Tommy and Paz will have to answer to their father.
8	"Chantaje"	4 November 2021	0.77
George's children want to manipulate him, they pressure Carmen to make a decision, and follow Leticia's advice and threaten Carmen. Clío makes public her new relationship, Andy freaks out.
9	"Saldos pendientes"	5 November 2021	0.72
Juancho must pay his debt, Carmen has the solution. Clío's antics on social media have consequences.
10	"Reacción exagerada"	8 November 2021	0.71
Carmen wants to tell George what happened, but Paz beats her to it. Juancho and Leticia seal an agreement, they will keep silent.
11	"El único culpable"	9 November 2021	0.72
Juancho assumes responsibility before George, he will have to pay the price for his mistake, but before doing so he asks Leticia for something. Andy supports Carmen, she is sorry for what she did.
12	"Un problema tras otro"	10 November 2021	0.75
Carmen visits Kurt asking for a new chance, but only receives bad news. Thanks to his brother, George finds Carmen, and Andy is hurt. Margarita talks to her daughter.
13	"La servidumbre"	11 November 2021	0.77
Seeing her grandmother in uniform, Carmen is filled with anger; her complaint falls on deaf ears.
14	"Sin papeles"	15 November 2021	N/A
The firm's lawyer gives Carmen some bad news. Leticia tries to win her ex-husband back, but he is clear about his feelings. Clío marks her territory, Andy and the movie are hers.
15	"Una oferta sincera"	16 November 2021	N/A
Upon learning of Carmen's problem, thanks to her brother, George decides to make her a proposal. Leticia must settle her debt with the lawyer Bustillo. Tommy defends Lara.
16	"La solución de Andy"	17 November 2021	N/A
Carmen is furious, she makes it clear that she is not a gold digger. Andy has an idea that can fix things. Margarita is looking for Juancho.
17	"Una idea absurda"	18 November 2021	N/A
George is indignant when Carmen confesses that she is considering marrying his son. Tania insists on intriguing, but Carmen doesn't fall for her game. A hidden camera shows everything.
18	"Institución sagrada"	19 November 2021	N/A
Carmen comes clean with George, she knows she shouldn't have even considered Andy's proposal, they come to an agreement and announce how they will solve the immigration problem. Margarita objects.
19	"Terreno peligroso"	22 November 2021	N/A
While Tenoch explains to Carmen the risks of an arranged marriage, George asks Margarita for help in convincing her daughter to return to the house. Lara confronts her mother.
20	"Una pareja feliz"	23 November 2021	N/A
George and Carmen announce that they have reconciled and will live together. Leticia wants to avoid it at all costs and calls Juancho.
21	"Por amor"	24 November 2021	N/A
Just before the wedding, an immigration agent shows up at George's house, wanting to question Carmen. Andy arrives with good news, but doesn't get the answer he expected.
22	"Todo por un beso"	25 November 2021	N/A
Carmen advises Andy to show his love without imagining what is coming. George witnesses a shocking scene, he feels betrayed. Margarita surprises Tenoch with her reaction.
23	"Una oportunidad"	26 November 2021	N/A
Carmen asks Clío for help and explains why she needs the job, just at that moment an immigration agent arrives at the studio. George complains to his son for not telling him the truth.
24	"Una montaña rusa"	29 November 2021	N/A
Clío confesses her secret to Andy, now he must decide. George tells his wife that he witnessed the kiss, but Carmen complains that he didn't see her reaction.
25	"Una mala idea"	30 November 2021	N/A
The reporters put Clío in a difficult situation, Andy improvises to get her out of trouble and makes a proposal. Tania finds the perfect excuse to be alone with George.
26	"Con el viento a su favor"	1 December 2021	N/A
Leticia arrives in New York at the right time, George needs a translator and does not perceive the dark intentions of his ex. Carmen manages to sing at Tenoch's restaurant.
27	"Verdades a medias"	2 December 2021	N/A
Leticia makes George believe they spent the night together and manipulates him with lies. Kurt shows Carmen the evidence of the breach of contract. Lara is exposed on social media.
28	"Lo importante es el amor"	3 December 2021	N/A
George and Carmen reach an agreement, although his conscience pricks him. Lara makes a decision that drags Tommy down.
29	"Golpe al corazón"	6 December 2021	N/A
Leticia makes a drama scene in front of Carmen, but she makes it clear that she will only believe what George tells her. Clío responds to Andy's questioning, not telling the whole truth. Lara learns about the bet.
30	"Error"	7 December 2021	N/A
Tormented by guilt, George tells Carmen what happened with Leticia in New York, seeking to justify himself. Tommy confesses his feelings. Andy, worried, follows in Clío's footsteps.
31	"Recuerdos borrosos"	8 December 2021	N/A
Paz does not allow herself to be manipulated and talks to her father, George demands an explanation from Leticia. Andy discovers Clío's secret, he feels an obligation to support her.
32	"Una voz conocida"	9 December 2021	N/A
Carmen sings in the restaurant, she doesn't know she is being recorded. Félix asks George a direct question, he tells his wife what is going on. Alan wants to teach Lara a lesson.
33	"Sin secretos"	10 December 2021	N/A
Carmen tells her family that there was something between George and Leticia, and announces that she is leaving the house. Leticia gets excited about the trip to Moscow.
34	"Fraude"	13 December 2021	N/A
George is not only a victim of blackmail, but also falls into a trap, everyone is exposed. Clío loses control and blames Carmen. Tania takes advantage of the situation, but is stopped.
35	"Buscando una solución"	14 December 2021	N/A
George explains to his wife that the journalist tried to blackmail him and that he has proof, Carmen meets with Felix, but he tries to manipulate her. Clío speaks out in front of the media, Andy intervenes.
36	"Pura mala intención"	15 December 2021	N/A
Following the plan, Kurt counts on Carmen's innocence. Leticia lies to avoid problems.
37	"Un paso adelante"	16 December 2021	N/A
Andy's plan works, Kurt is ridiculed and Carmen takes advantage of the opportunity, demanding changes in her contract. Tania receives a hard blow and looks for an ally.
38	"Rodeados de intrigas"	17 December 2021	N/A
Clío is furious when she learns that her mother is exposed, Andy does not know he is being followed and Félix manages to get new evidence. Carmen advises her brother to make a decision.
39	"Una nueva vida"	20 December 2021	N/A
Leticia seeks Carmen to put pressure on her, she decides to talk directly to George. Andy comes clean with Clío. Félix commits a reckless act.
40	"Una medida necesaria"	21 December 2021	N/A
A call from George touches Carmen's heart deeply, Andy is there to comfort her. Yuliana asks for a second chance.
41	"Una ex insidiosa"	22 December 2021	N/A
Carmen looks for George to talk, but finds the celebration organized by Leticia. Andy makes a serious complaint to Tania and takes action.
42	"Entre la espada y la pared"	23 December 2021	N/A
Félix manages to provoke a new scandal, Carmen wants to give an explanation and counts on Andy to clear everything up, but a demand from Clío changes things. Juancho and Leticia are in danger.
43	"Escritor sumiso"	24 December 2021	N/A
George accepts Leticia's proposal to change environment, but Paz's announcement will be an obstacle. Following Tania's instructions, Félix insists on unmasking Carmen.
44	"Una actriz sincera"	27 December 2021	N/A
Clío makes a move that allows her to look like a victim, but she does not measure the consequences. Carmen falls into the trap, Tania and Kurt take advantage of the situation.
45	"Limando asperezas"	28 December 2021	N/A
As agreed, Clío arrives at the press conference to announce the new star of the film and leaves everyone shocked. Carmen shares her fears with Andy.
46	"No más mentiras"	29 December 2021	N/A
Andy can no longer deny his feelings and talks openly with his father. George listens to what Carmen has to say. Paz seeks support from her mother-in-law, she will do whatever it takes to protect Pedro.
47	"Libre"	30 December 2021	N/A
Carmen appears for the last time in costume and says goodbye to her character, unaware that George will give her a document that could change her life. Leticia gives her ex a trip to the past.
48	"No alcanza el amor"	3 January 2022	N/A
George is surprised when Carmen returns the divorce papers. Andy confronts Félix to stop harassing him. Leticia takes a step closer to her ex.
49	"Fuera de tiempo"	4 January 2022	N/A
An unforeseen action by Andy makes Carmen react. Leticia's strategy works, so she seizes the moment.
50	"Una decisión absurda"	5 January 2022	N/A
Carmen feels betrayed by the love of her life, George tries to justify himself and talks straight to Leticia. Andy looks for Clío, but she tells him she doesn't want any trouble, she asks him to leave.
51	"Un hijo desleal"	6 January 2022	N/A
A manipulated video is the evidence with which Félix exposes Carmen and Andy, George reacts violently.
52	"No me gusta mentir"	7 January 2022	N/A
Carmen confesses in a press conference what kind of relationship she has with Andy, but George feels it is too late. Paz asks her father for help, she wants to prevent Pedro from altering her plans.
53	"Declaración pública"	10 January 2022	N/A
Lara advises Carmen to record a video to post on social media. Kurt and Tania are exposed and ask for help. Leticia organizes a celebration, but George prefers to sneak away.
54	"La confesión de Andy"	11 January 2022	N/A
Andy wants to hide from Carmen, but when she offers her support, he has no choice but to tell the truth.
55	"Cambio de foco"	12 January 2022	N/A
For the sake of her career, Carmen will have to make changes in her life and cut ties. Clío tells George what she knows, he is surprised by his son's attitude.
56	"Patrañas"	13 January 2022	N/A
Andy explains to his father that Félix was blackmailing him and takes responsibility for what happened, then George receives the divorce papers. Paz is exposed to Pedro and asks for forgiveness.
57	"Recelo"	14 January 2022	N/A
Clío apologizes to George for not telling him about her illness and Andy misunderstands things when he sees them together. Rick surprises Carmen not only with matters of work, but of the heart.
58	"Clío es peligrosa"	17 January 2022	N/A
Andy is worried about the closeness between his dad and Clío. Alan makes fun of Tommy and a fight between them ends badly. Tania tries to impose herself as manager.
59	"Enfrentados"	18 January 2022	N/A
George makes it clear that he will do anything to protect Carmen. Tenoch asks Mama Rosa for Margarita's hand.
60	"New York, New York"	19 January 2022	N/A
Refusing at first, Carmen accepts an invitation to dinner.
61	"Estrategia"	20 January 2022	N/A
Juancho becomes Carmen's new driver and passes important information to George. Pedro wants to know what is going on between Margarita and Tenoch.
62	"Los fantasmas del pasado"	21 January 2022	N/A
Andy reads the letter where Michelle explains why she left him Clío's diary. Rick asks Carmen if something happened with George.
63	"La guerra de los tacos"	24 January 2022	N/A
Mamá Rosa's decision to become independent becomes a serious problem that confronts Margarita against her. Andy gives Carmen some advice after hearing her confession.
64	"Una relación extraña"	25 January 2022	N/A
Andy manages to get close to Clío, but she puts a condition that he disagrees with. Rick announces to Carmen the new twist he has in store for her career. Yuliana exposes Leticia.
65	"Exceso de trabajo"	26 January 2022	N/A
Kurt continues to act dishonestly and tricks Carmen by offering her some vitamins. Leticia cannot escape the blackmail against her.
66	"Un año de ausencia"	28 January 2022	N/A
George accidentally learns of Rick's plans for Carmen. Clío and Andy join forces for a good cause. Robert confesses to Juliana about his inheritance.
67	"Un riesgo imprudente"	31 January 2022	N/A
Clío seeks George's help, she needs to protect her mother. A visit to the doctor increases Paz's fears and Cameron tries to calm her down.
68	"Mi Ángel"	1 February 2022	N/A
Everyone is looking for Michelle. Carmen will have to deal with a situation she doesn't know about and avoid danger. Andy is jealous of the closeness between his father and Clío and asks for an explanation.
69	"Sentimientos a flor de piel"	3 February 2022	N/A
George can't control himself and makes a confession to Carmen, Leticia overhears their conversation. Under pressure, Pedro reveals his grandmother's secret.
70	"El verdadero padre"	4 February 2022	N/A
Leticia tries to speed up the wedding between Paz and Cameron, but George disagrees. Andy discovers Michelle's secret.
71	"Entre delincuentes"	7 February 2022	N/A
Gina becomes Kevin's bait to take revenge on Pedro, Mama Rosa asks for help. At the hospital, and to protect the Jurado's, Rick stands up to the police.
72	"Al rescate"	8 February 2022	N/A
Carmen is worried and talks to George to avoid more problems. Andy realizes how he feels and comes clean with Clío.
73	"Arriba las manos"	9 February 2022	N/A
George is on the phone with Carmen when an armed man enters the house. While Andy turns to his uncle Tenoch, Kurt finds Clío, his threats are serious.
74	"Amor del bueno"	11 February 2022	N/A
Danger brings George and Carmen closer; although she believes that nothing should change, Leticia will not stay calm, she proposes an alliance. Cameron's words go straight to Paz's heart.
75	"Boda expresa"	14 February 2022	N/A
Although she is worried about her friendship with Cameron, Paz makes an announcement that shocks her parents and confronts them.
76	"Doble cara"	15 February 2022	N/A
Carmen and Yuliana confirm with their own eyes their suspicions about Leticia.
77	"Otra traición"	16 February 2022	N/A
George has no more doubts about Leticia. Andy is not afraid to confront Kurt.
78	"Diagnóstico oportuno"	17 February 2022	N/A
Leticia finds a way to avoid a confrontation with George. Rick insists on the subject of the tour to put pressure on Carmen.
79	"Revelaciones"	18 February 2022	N/A
When discovered, Rick conceals himself by telling George that he wants to talk to him. Andy is no longer alone in his crusade against Kurt.
80	"Una segunda chance"	21 February 2022	N/A
Carmen announces that she is willing to give herself another chance at love, while Juancho warns about the danger his niece is in.
81	"Terapia de armonización"	22 February 2022	N/A
George's idea of finding ways to speed up Leticia's recovery becomes a problem, he only thinks of protecting Carmen. A mysterious woman appears to confront Rick.
82	"La víctima de Rick"	23 February 2022	N/A
While Carmen talks to the press about her relationship with Rick, George meets with Susana and listens to her story.
83	"Mi secreto"	24 February 2022	N/A
A revelation from Susanna could change Rick's plans. Marlene files a complaint against Tommy Cruz. Roco distances himself from the Jurado family.
84	"Razones de peso"	25 February 2022	N/A
Carmen demands an explanation from her ex as she doesn't understand why he is so aggressive. While George seeks Susana's support, Leticia gives Rick a serious warning.
85	"Farsante"	28 February 2022	N/A
Rick follows Leticia's advice and lies to Susana to avoid problems, but doubts worry Carmen.
86	"Mentiras y rupturas"	1 March 2022	N/A
Carmen asks a direct question and Susana tells her half the truth. Lara has proof to save Tommy. George asks for forgiveness.
87	"¿Estás fingiendo?"	2 March 2022	N/A
George learns what Leticia said about Carmen and questions her memory loss.
88	"Una doble cara"	3 March 2022	N/A
Juancho accuses Rick and he swears that he is innocent in front of Carmen, but then assumes his guilt and maintains his threat against the Jurado family. Leticia can't continue to deceive Paz.
89	"Asesino"	4 March 2022	N/A
Willing to do anything for the woman he loves, Andy threatens Kurt, he will not rest until he sees him in jail. George tracks down Camilo Bustillos.
90	"Vivan los novios"	7 March 2022	N/A
Shortly before the wedding, Paz tells her father a truth. Margarita announces that she will move in with Tenoch, but someone disagrees and Carmen will have to negotiate.
91	"No es falta de amor"	8 March 2022	N/A
George is looking for an excuse to get Carmen out of the party, his intentions are clear, but she has doubts.
92	"Más que cómplices"	9 March 2022	N/A
Juancho and Leticia fall into George's trap, they are exposed and try to justify themselves, but George doesn't want any more explanations.
93	"Los amantes"	10 March 2022	N/A
The Jurado's find out about the love affair between Juancho and Leticia. George will go after Carmen and will not let anyone stop him.
94	"Abuso de poder"	11 March 2022	N/A
Clío rejects Kurt's offer and gives him a warning. Abusing his position, Rick fills Carmen's agenda with activities, as he wants to keep control of the situation.
95	"Enfocada"	14 March 2022	N/A
Despite the setbacks, George manages to talk to Carmen and tell her everything that has happened, but she only thinks about her career.
96	"Bajo control"	15 March 2022	N/A
Rick must answer a direct question. Carmen clarifies who makes the decisions about her life.
97	"El hombre que amo"	16 March 2022	N/A
Carmen arrives at George's house to make up for lost time, Rick can't control his anger and tries to impose himself using the tour as an excuse. Clío calls Andy to tell him how she feels.
98	"Indefensa"	17 March 2022	N/A
Kurt wants to avoid any more mistakes, so he summons Clío through an anonymous message to solve the problem.
99	"Sorpresa"	18 March 2022	N/A
During the premiere of the movie, an unexpected appearance and a message on the big screen triggers a commotion.
100	"La felicidad"	21 March 2022	N/A
A new family member arrives unexpectedly, delaying George and Carmen's plans. Clío takes control of her life, with Andy's support. Juancho asks for a new opportunity.
