= Consuelo Duval =

Mexican comedian and actress (born 1969)

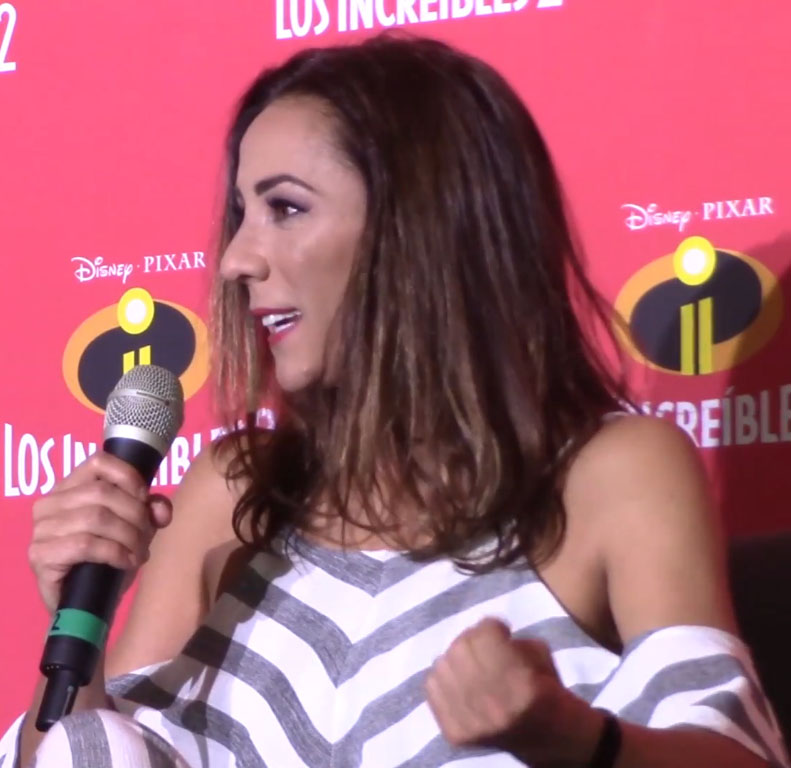
- Duval at a conference for Incredibles 2.
- Born: María del Consuelo Dussauge Calzada; 11 January 1969 (age 57); Parral, Chihuahua, Mexico
- Relatives: María Duval (aunt); Michel Duval (son)

Comedy career
- Years active: 1999-present
- Medium: Television
- Genres: Sitcom, character comedy

María del Consuelo Dussauge Calzada (born 11 January 1969), more commonly known by her stage name Consuelo Duval, is a Mexican comedian and actress of film, television, theatre, and voice-over. She is known for her various comic characters such as the overbearingly abusive housewife Federica P. Luche from the sitcom La familia P. Luche, the dim-witted, cross-eyed receptionist Sisi, and the amiable, uncultured naca Nacaranda from La hora pico.

== Early life ==
Duval was born in Parral, Chihuahua, Mexico, while her mother was visiting her grandmother. Her mother died in 1970 and she was raised by her father in Mexico City where they lived in the Unidad Habitacional Nonoalco-Tlatelolco. Duval has stated that her stage name is based on her paternal aunt, María Duval (María Dussauge Ortiz), a popular singer and actress.

== Career ==
=== Acting ===
Duval has appeared in many telenovelas, reality shows, and comedy programs since 1990. However, she has gained mainstream popularity in the sketch comedy television show La hora pico, co-starring Adrián Uribe, Miguel Galván, and Lorena de la Garza, where she portrays various comic characters such as Sisi, Nakaranda Estefanía Cacho Partida, La Cajera, Boatriz, Lahora (a parody of Laura Bozzo), among others. Duval had a recurring role as Damela Micha (a parody of Adela Micha) on El Privilegio de Mandar, produced by the same producers of La hora pico. The series' title is a pun on the title of a telenovela in which Duval appeared, El Privilegio de Amar. All of the aforementioned shows were produced by Carla Estrada.

Duval has worked with other Televisa producers and comedians, most notably Eugenio Derbez. She first portrayed Federica P. Luche on Derbez en cuando in 1998 and reprised the role on XHDRBZ. When La familia P. Luche eventually became a sitcom on its own, she received second billing behind Derbez. La Familia Peluche won a TVyNovelas Award for "Best Comedy Program".

She also appeared in Televisa's coverage of the 2000 Summer Olympics and 2002 FIFA World Cup, performing comedy sketches.

In 2013, Duval formed part of the supporting cast in Emilio Larrosa's telenovela Libre para amarte.

On April 5, 2023, Duval starred in the film Unhappily Ever After sharing credits with fellow comedian and actor Adrián Uribe and actress Livia Brito. Also in 2023, Duval and de la Garza were reunited as stars of a new series, Tal para cual, which she reprises her role from La hora pico as Nacaranda.

For her contributions to television, Duval's handprints have been placed on the Paseo de las Luminarias alongside those of her aunt.

=== Voice-over ===
Duval has dubbed, in Latin American Spanish, characters such as Helen Parr/Elastigirl from The Incredibles and Maggie in Home on the Range.
