= 11th TVyNovelas Awards =

1993 Mexican TV awards

- Date: March 29, 1993
- Location: Centro de Espectáculos "Premier", México D.F.
- Hosted by: Raúl Velasco, Liza Echeverría, Rebecca de Alba, Luis de la Corte & Lorena Tassinari

Highlights
- Most awards: De frente al sol (8)
- Most nominations: De frente al sol (12); María Mercedes (12)

Television/radio coverage
- Network: Canal de las Estrellas

The 11th TVyNovelas Awards were an academy of special awards to the best telenovelas and TV shows. The awards ceremony took place on March 29, 1993 in the Centro de Espectáculos "Premier" in Mexico D.F. The ceremony was televised in Mexico by Canal de las Estrellas.

Raúl Velasco, Liza Echeverría, Rebecca de Alba, Luis de la Corte and Lorena Tassinari hosted the show. De frente al sol won 8 awards, the most for the evening, including Best Telenovela. Other winners María Mercedes won 6 awards, El abuelo y yo won 3 awards, Las secretas intenciones won 2 awards and Baila conmigo won 1 award.

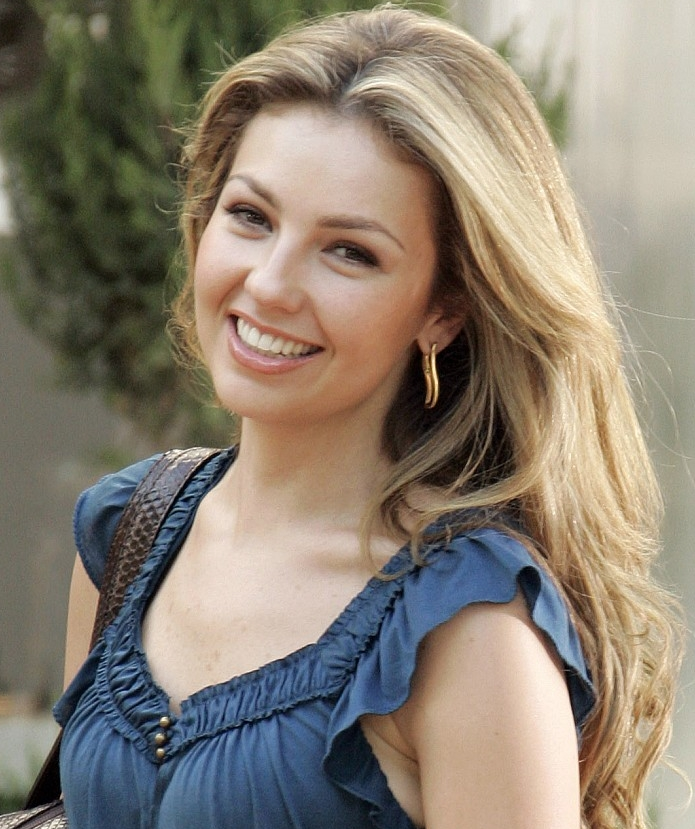
Thalía, winner for Best Young Lead Actress and Female Singer of the Year.

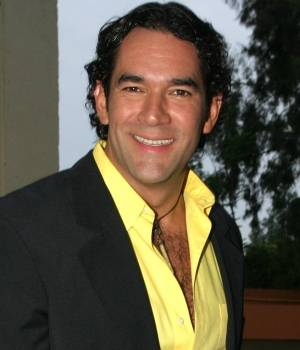
Eduardo Santamarina, winner for Best Young Lead Actor.

== Summary of awards and nominations ==
Telenovela	Nominations	Awards
De frente al sol	12	8
María Mercedes	12	6
Baila conmigo	9	1
El abuelo y yo	4	3
Valeria y Maximiliano	4	0
Las secretas intenciones	2	2
La sonrisa del diablo	2	0
Triángulo	1	0

== Winners and nominees ==
=== Telenovelas ===
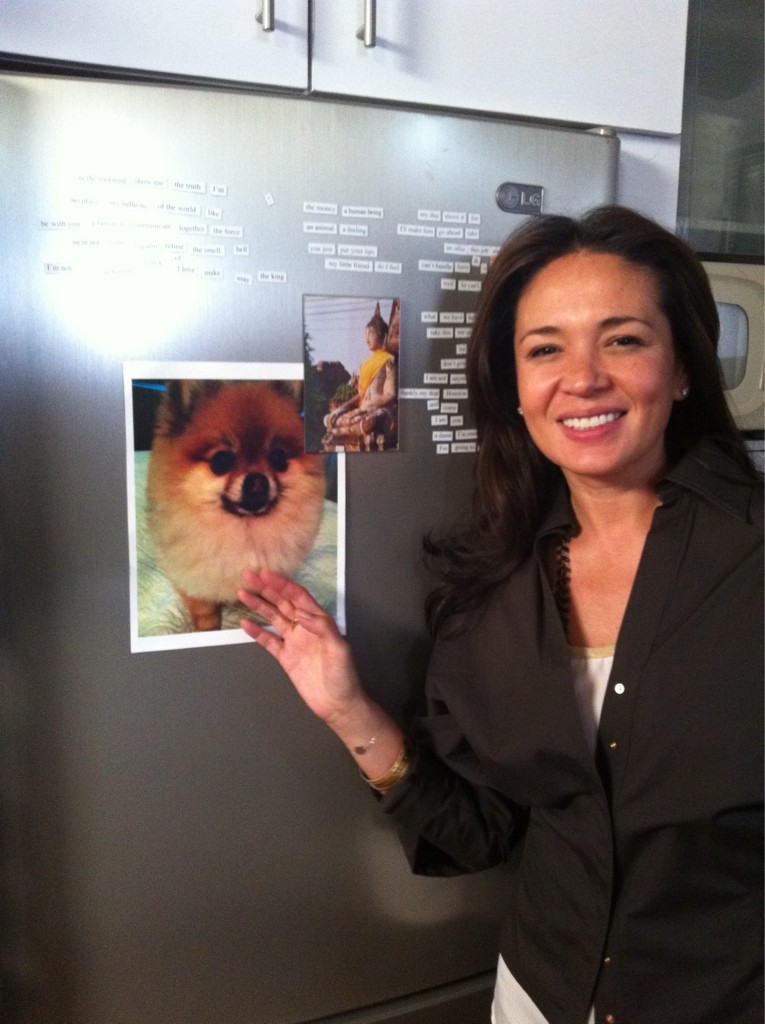
Yolanda Andrade, winner for Best Female Revelation.

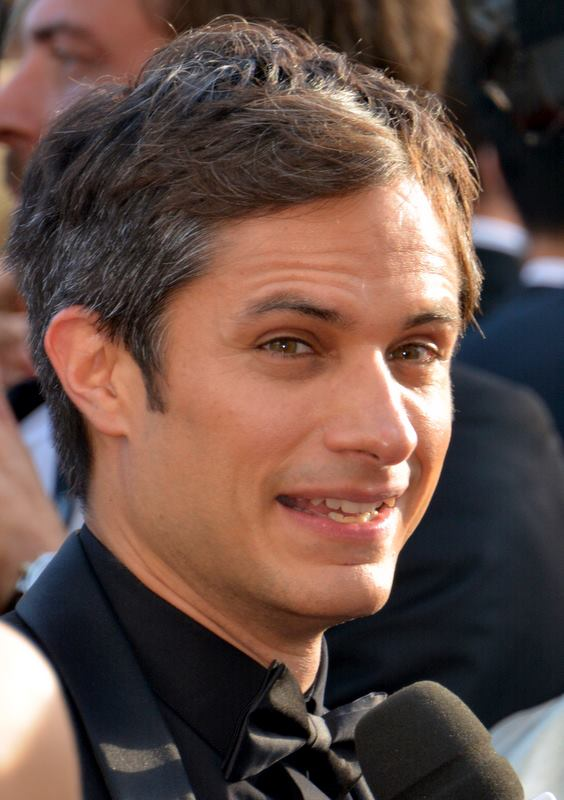
Gael García Bernal, winner for Best Child Performance.

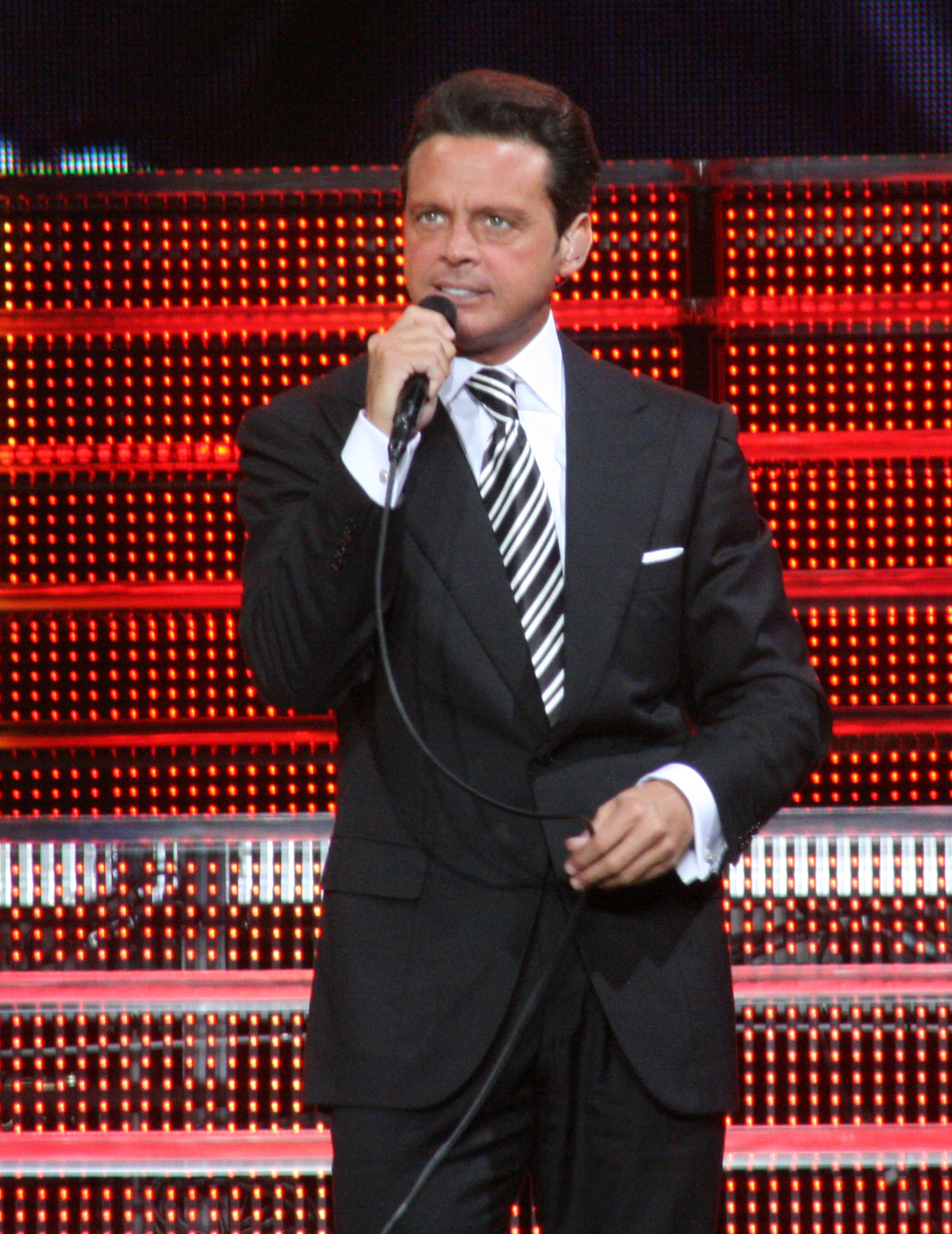
Luis Miguel, winner for Male Singer of the Year and awarded with a Special Award for Best Album of 1992.

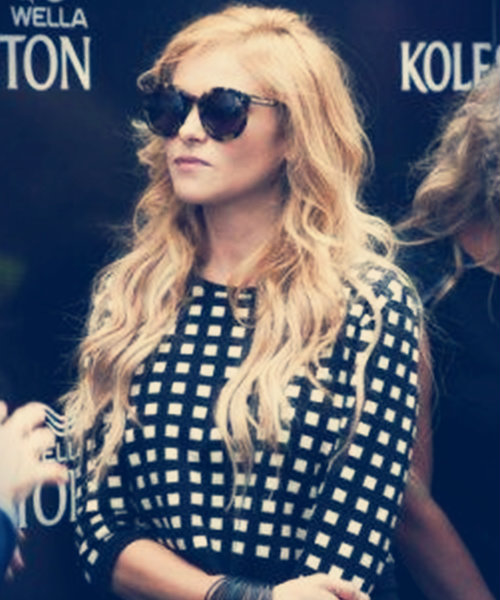
Paulina Rubio, winner for Female Singer Revelation of the Year.

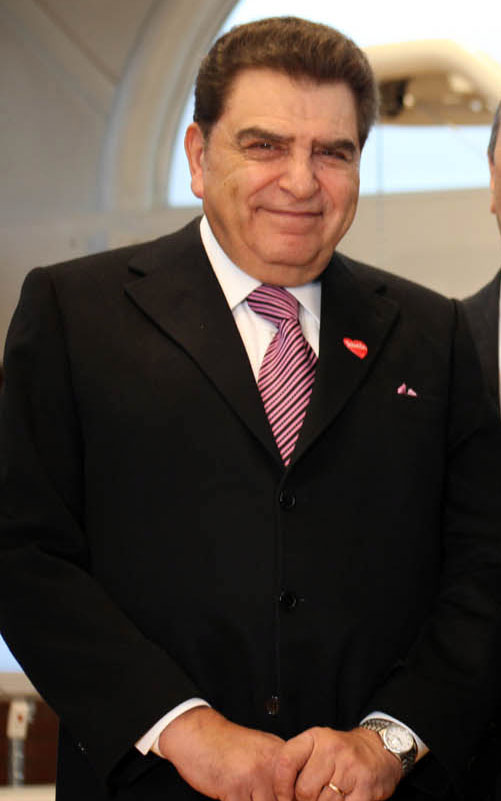
Mario Kreutzberger, awarded with Special Award for Best Host.

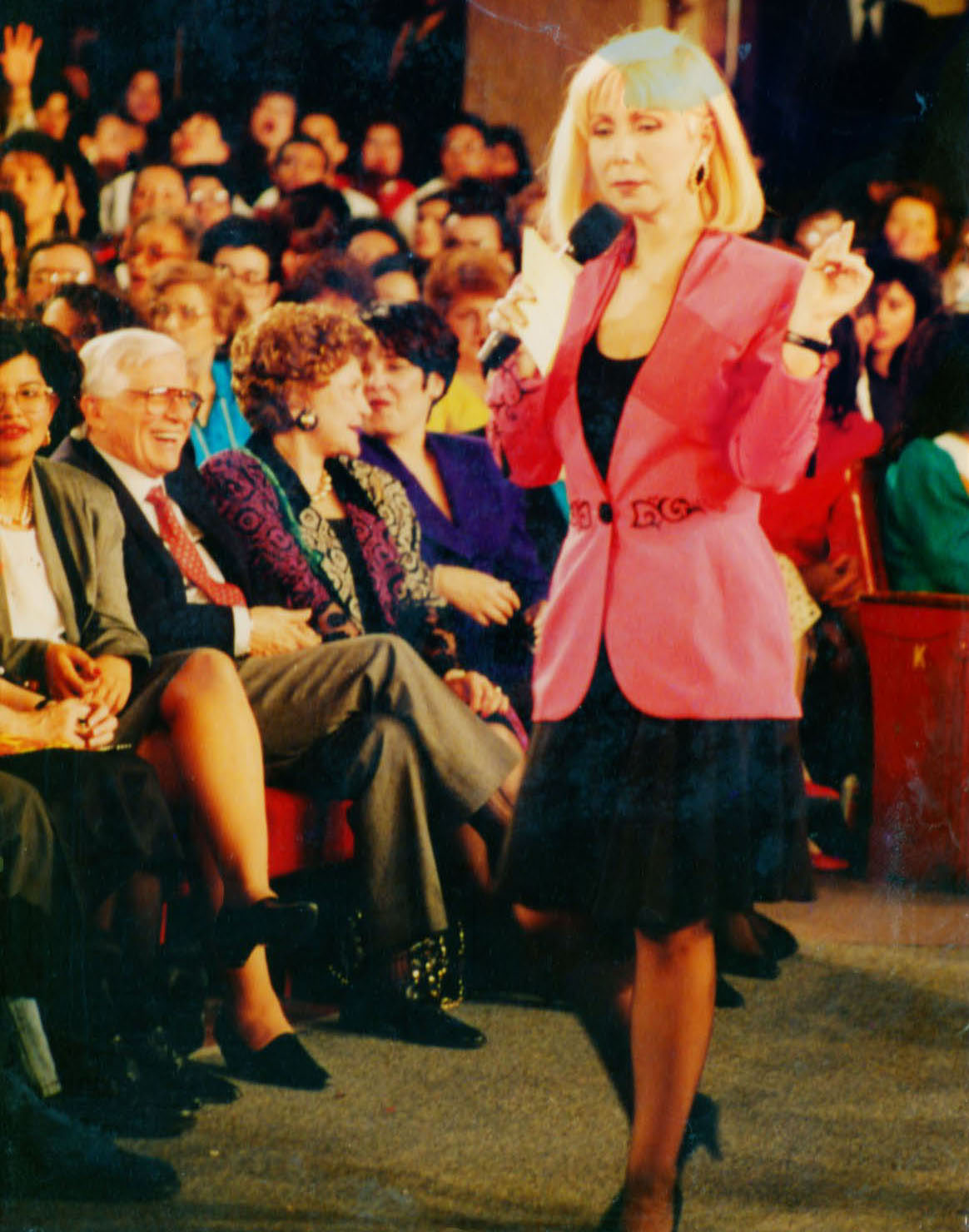
Cristina Saralegui, awarded with Special Award for Best Hostess.

Best Telenovela	Best Original Story or Adaptation
De frente al sol; María Mercedes; Valeria y Maximiliano	René Muñoz – De frente al sol
Best Actress	Best Actor
María Sorté – De frente al sol; Leticia Calderón – Valeria y Maximiliano; Thalía – María Mercedes	Arturo Peniche – María Mercedes; Alfredo Adame – De frente al sol; Juan Ferrara – Valeria y Maximiliano
Best Antagonist Actress	Best Antagonist Actor
Laura Zapata – Maria Mercedes; Anna Silvetti – De frente al sol; Lilia Aragón – De frente al sol	José Elías Moreno – De frente al sol; Marco Muñoz – Valeria y Maximiliano; Roberto Ballesteros – María Mercedes
Best Leading Actress	Best Leading Actor
Ada Carrasco – De frente al sol; Blanca Sánchez – La sonrisa del diablo; María Victoria – Baila conmigo	Jorge Martínez de Hoyos – El abuelo y yo; Enrique Álvarez Félix – La sonrisa del diablo; Joaquín Cordero – Baila conmigo
Best Supporting Actress	Best Supporting Actor
Carmen Salinas – María Mercedes; Gabriela Goldsmith – María Mercedes; Julieta Egurrola – Triángulo	Raúl Padilla "Chóforo" – María Mercedes; Adalberto Martínez "Resortes" – El abuelo y yo; Fernando Ciangherotti – María Mercedes
Best Young Lead Actress	Best Young Lead Actor
Thalía – María Mercedes; Bibi Gaytán – Baila conmigo; Itatí Cantoral – De frente al sol	Eduardo Santamarina – De frente al sol; Eduardo Capetillo – Baila conmigo; Rafael Rojas – Baila conmigo
Best Female Revelation	Best Male Revelation
Yolanda Andrade – Las secretas intenciones; Andrea Legarreta – Baila conmigo; Nicky Mondellini – María Mercedes	Cristian Castro – Las secretas intenciones; Alexis Ayala – Baila conmigo; Rodrigo Vidal – Baila conmigo
Best Debut Actress	Best Child Performance
Arcelia Ramírez – De frente al sol	Gael García Bernal – El abuelo y yo; Ludwika Paleta – El abuelo y yo
Best Direction	Best Direction of the Cameras
Mónica Miguel – De frente al sol	Patty Juárez – Baila conmigo

=== Others ===
Best Comedy Program	Best Musical and Variety Program
Todo de todo	Siempre en domingo
Best Special Program	Best Hostess
Feliz Año Nuevo 1993	Rebecca de Alba
Best Comedy Actress	Best Comedy Actor
Anabel Ferreira – ¡Anabel!	Jorge Ortiz de Pinedo – Dr. Cándido Pérez
Female Singer of the Year	Male Singer of the Year
Thalía	Luis Miguel
Revelation as a Female Singer	Revelation as a Male Singer
Paulina Rubio	Cristian Castro
Best Band	Best Smile
Magneto	Alfredo Adame

=== Special awards ===
- Best Telenovela by Televisa (delivered by the then owner of the company, Emilio Azcárraga Milmo): Los ricos también lloran (to Valentín Pimstein, Verónica Castro and Rogelio Guerra)
- Best Album of 1992: "Romance" by Luis Miguel
- Best Ranchero Singer: Lucero
- Best Hair of the Year: Chao and Daniela Leites
- Best Producer and Hostess: Verónica Castro
- Lifetime Artistic Achievement Award: Antonio Aguilar and Silvia Derbez
- Support and Rescue of Mexican Romantic Music "La Hora Azul": Carlos Amador, Jaime Almeida and Susana Dosamantes

=== International Segment ===
This segment was transmitted only in the United States by Univision:

- Best Telenovela: María Mercedes
- Revelation of the Year: Sonya Smith for Cara sucia
- Best Host: Don Francisco for Sábado Gigante
- Best Hostess: Cristina Saralegui for El Show de Cristina
- Best News Program: Noticiario Univisión

=== Absent ===
People who did not attend the ceremony and were nominated in the shortlist in each category:

- Anabel Ferreira
- Fernando Ciangherotti
- Luis Miguel
