= TVyNovelas for Best Telenovela of the Year =

== Winners ==
Year	Telenovela	Producer
1983	El derecho de nacer	Ernesto Alonso
1984	Bodas de odio	Ernesto Alonso
1985	La traición	Ernesto Alonso
1986	Vivir un poco	Valentín Pimstein
1987	Cuna de lobos	Carlos Téllez
1988	Quinceañera	Carla Estrada
1989	Amor en silencio	Carla Estrada
1990	Mi segunda madre	Juan Osorio
1991	Alcanzar una estrella	Luis de Llano Macedo
1992	Cadenas de amargura	Carlos Sotomayor
1993	De frente al sol	Carla Estrada
1994	Corazón salvaje	José Rendón
1995	Imperio de cristal	Carlos Sotomayor
1996	Lazos de amor	Carla Estrada
1997	Cañaveral de pasiones	Humberto Zurita; Christian Bach
1998	Esmeralda	Salvador Mejía
1999	El Privilegio de Amar	Carla Estrada
2000	Laberintos de pasión	Ernesto Alonso
2001	Abrázame muy fuerte	Salvador Mejia
2002	El Manantial	Carla Estrada
2003	La Otra	Ernesto Alonso
2004	Amor Real	Carla Estrada
2005	Rubí	José Alberto Castro
2006	Alborada	Carla Estrada
2007	La fea más bella	Rosy Ocampo
2008	Destilando amor	Nicandro Diaz
2009	Fuego en la sangre	Salvador Mejia
2010	Hasta que el dinero nos separe	Emilio Larrosa
2011	Para volver a amar	Roberto Gómez Fernández; Giselle González

== Records ==
- Producer with most awards: Carla Estrada with 8 awards
- Producer with most nominations: Ernesto Alonso with 17 nominations
