= 14th TVyNovelas Awards =

1996 Mexican TV awards

- Date: May 7, 1996
- Location: México D.F.
- Hosted by: Erika Buenfil & Eduardo Santamarina

Highlights
- Most awards: Lazos de Amor (7)
- Most nominations: Lazos de Amor (12)

Television/radio coverage
- Network: Canal de las Estrellas

The 14th TVyNovelas Awards were an academy of special awards to the best soap operas and TV shows. The awards ceremony took place on May 7, 1996 in Mexico D.F. The ceremony was televised in Mexico by Canal de las Estrellas.

Erika Buenfil and Eduardo Santamarina hosted the show. Lazos de Amor won 7 awards, the most for the evening, including Best Telenovela. Other winners La dueña and María la del barrio won 4 awards, Alondra and El premio mayor won 3 awards, Si Dios me quita la vida won 2 awards and Acapulco, cuerpo y alma and Bajo un mismo rostro won 1 each.

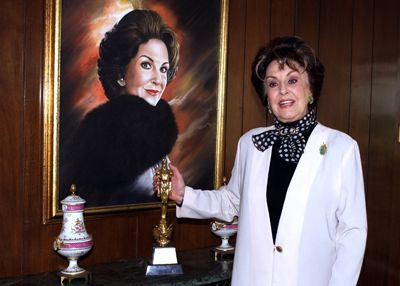
Marga López, winner for Best Leading Actress

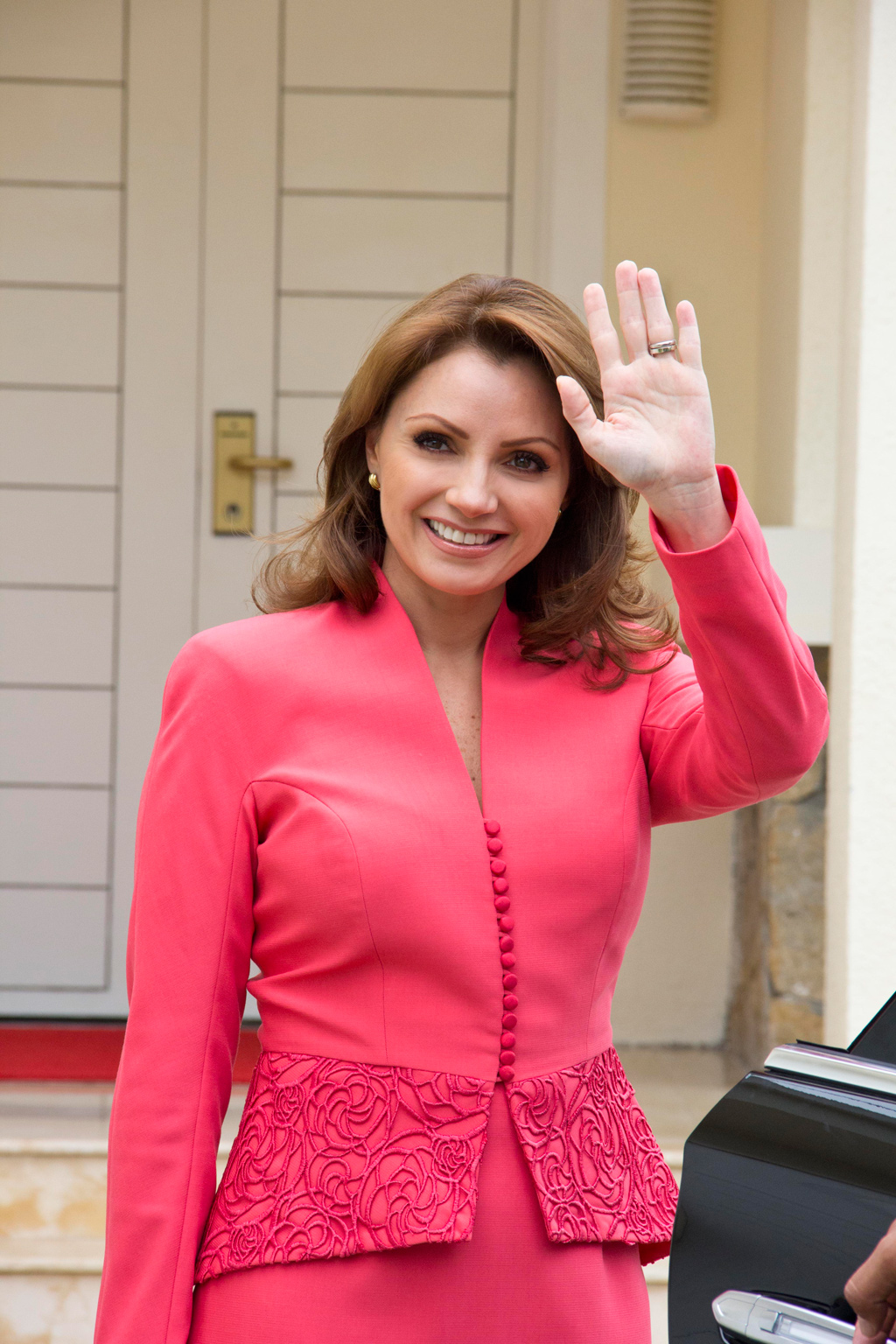
Angélica Rivera, winner for Best Female Revelation

== Summary of awards and nominations ==
Telenovela	Nominations	Awards
Lazos de amor	13	7
La dueña	8	4
Alondra	7	3
María la del barrio	6	4
Retrato de familia	4	0
El premio mayor	3	3
Si Dios me quita la vida	3	2
Acapulco, cuerpo y alma	3	1
Bajo un mismo rostro	1	1
La paloma	1	0
Caminos cruzados	1	0
María José	1	0

== Winners and nominees ==
=== Telenovelas ===
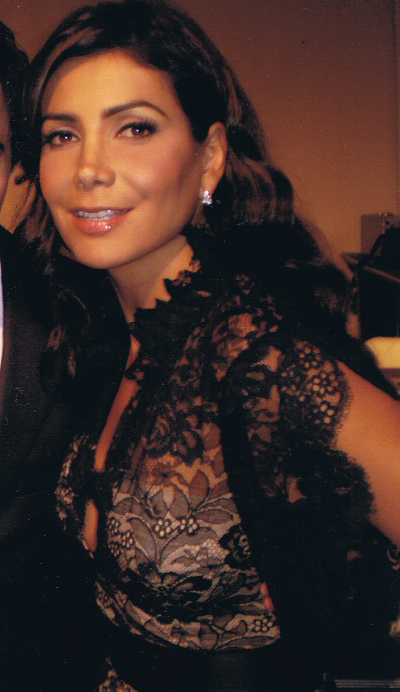
Patricia Manterola, winner for Best Debut Actress.

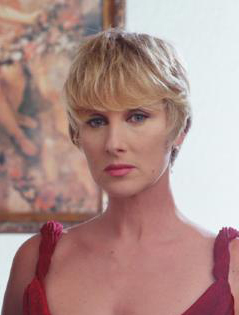
Christian Bach, winner for Best Production (with Humberto Zurita).

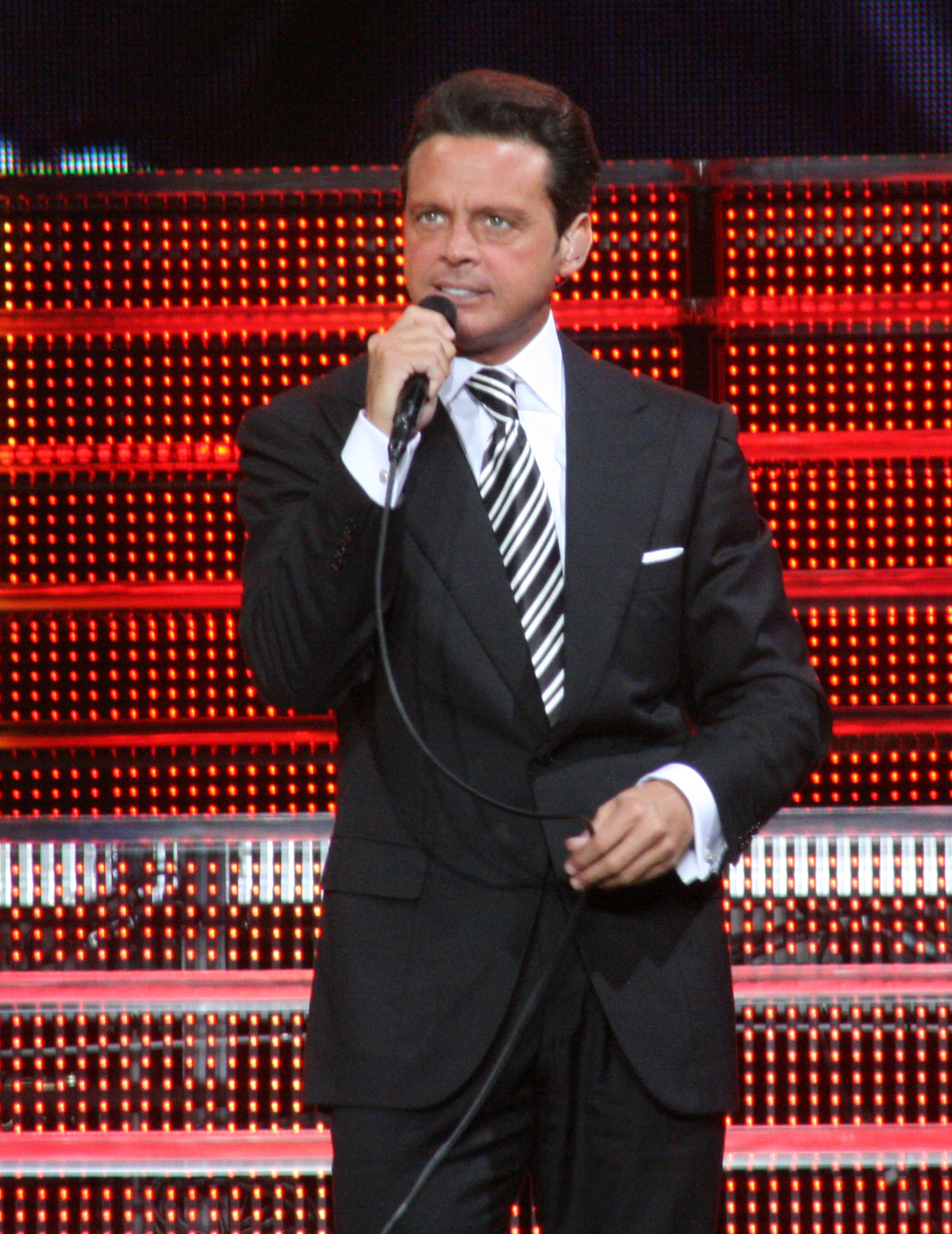
Luis Miguel, winner for Best Male Singer.

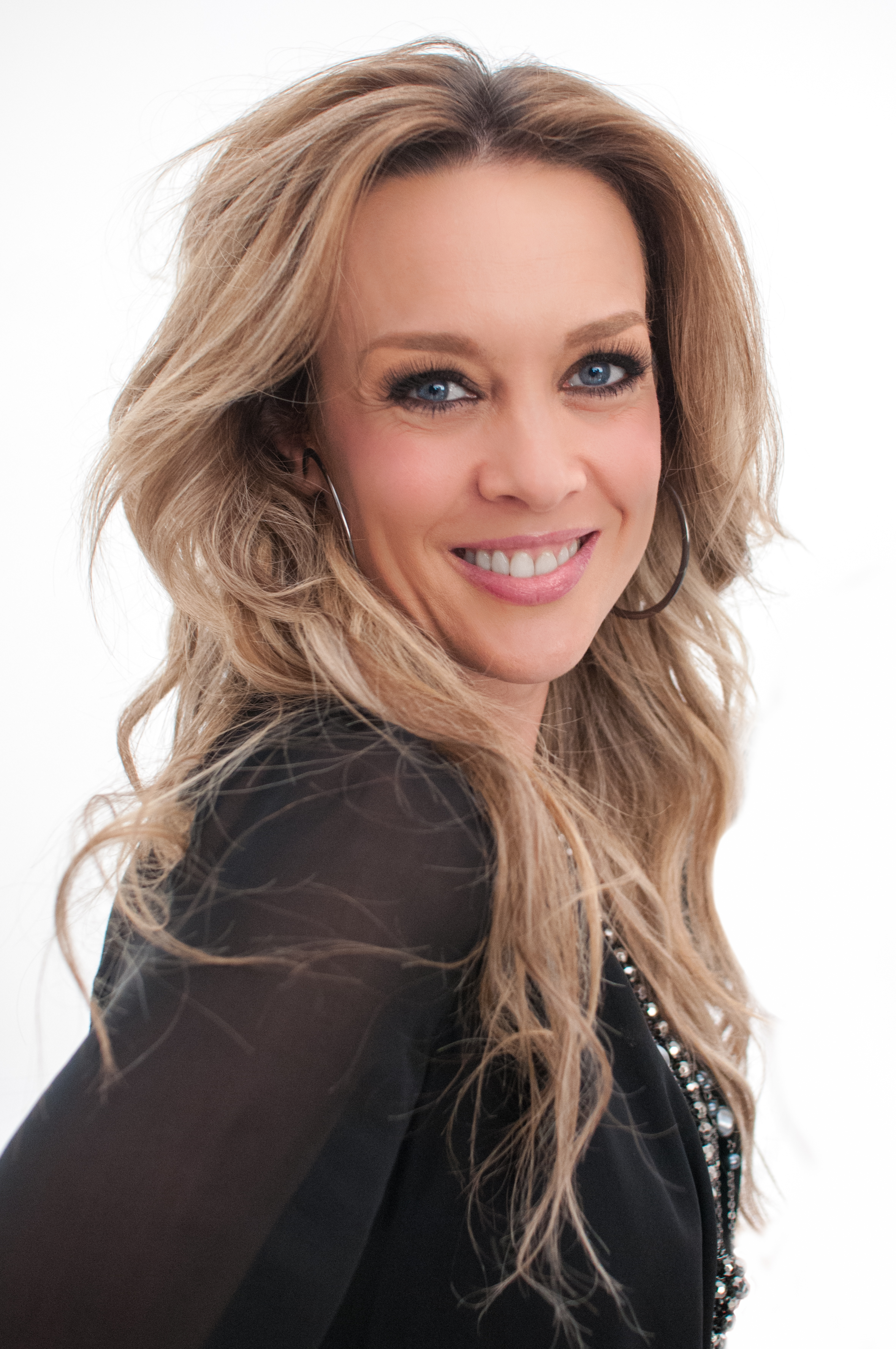
Fey, winner for Female Singer Revelation.

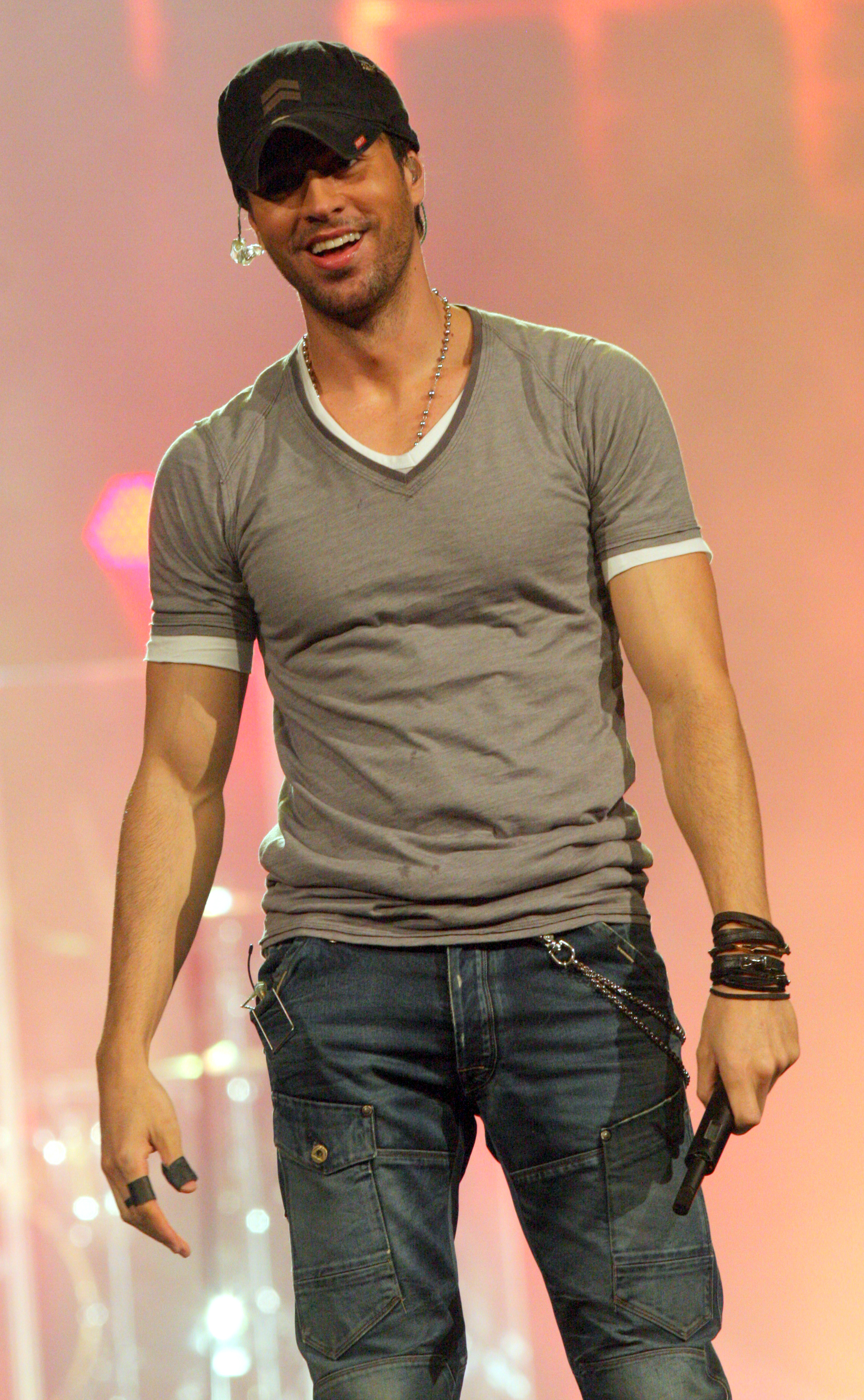
Enrique Iglesias, winner for Male Singer Revelation.

Best Telenovela	Best Production
Lazos de amor; La dueña; Retrato de familia	Christian Bach and Humberto Zurita – Bajo un mismo rostro
Best Actress	Best Actor
Lucero – Lazos de amor; Angélica Rivera – La dueña; Helena Rojo – Retrato de familia	Luis José Santander – Lazos de amor; Ernesto Laguardia – Alondra; Gonzalo Vega – Alondra
Best Antagonist Actress	Best Antagonist Actor
Itatí Cantoral – María la del barrio; Cynthia Klitbo – La dueña; Yolanda Andrade – Retrato de familia	Salvador Sánchez – La dueña; Alejandro Tommasi – Retrato de familia; Guillermo García Cantú – Acapulco, cuerpo y alma
Best Leading Actress	Best Leading Actor
Marga López – Lazos de amor; Irán Eory – María la del barrio; Silvia Derbez – Lazos de amor	Enrique Lizalde – Si Dios me quita la vida; Eric del Castillo – Alondra; Guillermo Murray – Lazos de amor
Best Supporting Actress	Best Supporting Actor
Verónica Merchant – Alondra; Carmen Salinas – María la del barrio; Maty Huitrón – Lazos de amor	Otto Sirgo – Lazos de amor; Miguel Pizarro – La dueña; Rafael Rojas – Si Dios me quita la vida
Best Young Lead Actress	Best Young Lead Actor
Ludwika Paleta – María la del barrio; Anahí – Alondra; Karla Talavera – Lazos de amor	Osvaldo Benavides – María la del barrio; Arath de la Torre – Caminos cruzados; Daniel Zamora – María José
Best Female Revelation	Best Male Revelation
Angélica Rivera – La dueña; Maite Embil – La paloma; Patricia Manterola – Acapulco, cuerpo y alma	Francisco Gattorno – La dueña; Juan Manuel Bernal – Lazos de amor; Orlando Miguel – Lazos de amor
Best Debut Actress	Best Debut Actor
Patricia Manterola – Acapulco, cuerpo y alma	Carlos Bonavides – El premio mayor
Best Musical Theme	Best Original Story or Adaptation
"Tengo todo contigo" — Alberto Ángel "El Cuervo" – La dueña	Yolanda Vargas Dulché – Alondra
Best Direction	Best Direction of the Cameras
Miguel Córcega and Mónica Miguel – Lazos de amor	Isabel Basurto and Alejandro Frutos – Lazos de amor

=== Others ===
Best Original Idea	Best Scenography
Emilio Larrosa, Verónica Suárez and Alejandro Pohlenz – El premio mayor	José Luis Gómez Alegría – El premio mayor
Best Costume Design	Best Decor
Silvia Terán and Lorena Pérez – Alondra	Sandra Cortés – Si Dios me quita la vida
Best Female Singer	Best Male Singer
Lucero	Luis Miguel
Female Singer Revelation	Male Singer Revelation
Fey	Enrique Iglesias

=== Special awards ===
- Telenovela with the Highest Rating: María la del barrio
- 10 Years of Permanence in the Air: Mujer, casos de la vida real
- Artistic Career: Javier López "Chabelo"
- The Most Sensual Lips: Marisol Santacruz
