= TVyNovelas Award for Best Direction =

Mexican television award

- Awarded for: Best director
- First award: 1985; Raúl Araiza for La Traición
- Currently held by: 2020; Francisco Franco Alba for La usurpadora

== Winners and nominees ==
=== 1980s ===
Winner	Nominated
3rd TVyNovelas Awards
Raúl Araiza for La traición	
4th TVyNovelas Awards
José Rendón for Tú o nadie and De pura sangre	Miguel Córcega for Esperándote; Rafael Banquells for Abandonada and Vivir un poco; Sergio Jiménez for Angélica
5th TVyNovelas Awards
Carlos Téllez and Antonio Acevedo for Cuna de lobos	Gonzalo Martínez Ortega for La gloria y el infierno; José Rendón for El Camino Secreto; Miguel Córcega for Marionetas; Sergio Jiménez for El engaño
6th TVyNovelas Awards
Raúl Araiza for Senda de gloria	
~~1989~~

=== 1990s ===
Winner	Nominated
8th TVyNovelas Awards
	Jorge Fons for La casa al final de la calle
9th TVyNovelas Awards
	Miguel Córcega for Cuando llega el amor
10th TVyNovelas Awards
	Luis Vélez for Cadenas de amargura
11th TVyNovelas Awards
	Mónica Miguel for De frente al sol
~~1994~~
13th TVyNovelas Awards
	Gonzalo Martínez and Jorge Fons for El vuelo del águila
14th TVyNovelas Awards
	Miguel Córcega and Mónica Miguel for Lazos de amor
15th TVyNovelas Awards
	Benjamín Cann and Claudio Reyes Rubio for Cañaveral de pasiones
16th TVyNovelas Awards
	Miguel Córcega for Esmeralda
17th TVyNovelas Awards
	Miguel Córcega and Mónica Miguel for El Privilegio de Amar

=== 2000s ===
Winner	Nominated
~~2000~~
19th TVyNovelas Awards
Miguel Córcega for Abrázame muy fuerte	
20th TVyNovelas Awards
Mónica Miguel for El manantial	
21st TVyNovelas Awards
Benjamín Cann for La otra	Alfredo Gurrola and Claudio Reyes Rubio for Niña amada mía; Luis Pardo and Juan Carlos Muñoz for Clase 406
~~2004 and 2005~~
24th TVyNovelas Awards
Eric Morales and Jorge Edgar Ramírez for La madrastra	Karina Duprez and Lilí Garza for Sueños y caramelos; Luis Pardo and Juan Carlos Muñoz for Rebelde; Mónica Miguel for Alborada
25th TVyNovelas Awards
Salvador Garcini and Rodrigo Zaunbos for La fea más bella	Alberto Díaz and Jorge Edgar Ramírez for Mundo de fieras; Claudio Reyes and José Ángel García for La verdad oculta; Gastón Tuset and Claudia Elisa Aguilar for Las dos caras de Ana; Sergio Cataño for Heridas de amor
26th TVyNovelas Awards
Miguel Córcega, Víctor Rodríguez and Ricardo de la Parra for Destilando amor	Lilí Garza and Mauricio Rodríguez and Yo amo a Juan Querendón; Mónica Miguel and Pasión
27th TVyNovelas Awards
Eric Morales and Xavier Romero for Alma de hierro	Edgar Ramírez and Alberto Díaz for Fuego en la sangre; Víctor Manuel Foulloux and Víctor Rodríguez for Cuidado con el ángel

=== 2010s ===
Winner	Nominated
28th TVyNovelas Awards
Mónica Miguel and Karina Duprez for Sortilegio	Aurelio Ávila and Jorge Fons for Mi pecado; Benjamín Cann and Alejandro Gamboa for Los exitosos Pérez
~~2011 and 2012~~
31st TVyNovelas Awards
Benjamín Cann and Rodrigo Zaunbos for Por Ella Soy Eva	Juan Carlos Muñoz and Alejandro Gamboa for Corona de lágrimas; Sergio Cataño and Claudio Reyes for Abismo de pasión
32nd TVyNovelas Awards
Benjamín Cann and Rodrigo Zaunbos for Mentir para vivir	Jorge Fons for Porque el amor manda; Salvador Garcini and Alejandro de la Parra for Amores verdaderos
33rd TVyNovelas Awards
Eric Morales and Xavier Romero for Yo no creo en los hombres	Francisco Franco and Juan Pablo Blanco for El color de la pasión; Benjamín Cann and Rodrigo Zaunbos for Qué pobres tan ricos; Jorge Fons, Aurelio Ávila and Lili Garza for Mi corazón es tuyo
34th TVyNovelas Awards
Lili Garza and Fernando Nesme for A que no me dejas	Benjamín Cann and Rodrigo Zaunbos for Antes muerta que Lichita; José Elias Moreno for La sombra del pasado; Claudia Elisa Aguilar and Juan Pablo Blanco for La vecina; Juan Carlos Muñoz and Luis Pardo for Muchacha italiana viene a casarse
35th TVyNovelas Awards
Eric Morales and Juan Pablo Blanco for La candidata	Francisco Franco and Ana Lorena Pérez Ríos for El hotel de los secretos; Walter Doehner and Ana Lorena Pérez Ríos for Sin rastro de ti; Claudio Reyes Rubio and Sergio Cataño for Tres veces Ana; Salvador Sánchez and Santiago Barbosa for Vino el amor
36th TVyNovelas Awards
Eric Morales and Juan Pablo Blanco for Caer en tentación	Benjamín Cann and Rodrigo Zaunbos for La doble vida de Estela Carrillo; Sergio Cataño for Me declaro culpable; Héctor Bonilla and Aurelio Ávila for Mi marido tiene familia; Benjamín Cann and Rodrigo Zaunbos for Papá a toda madre
37th TVyNovelas Awards
Alejandro Lozano, Carlos Cock, and Rolando Ocampo for Amar a muerte	Salvador Sánchez and Alejandro Gamboa for Hijas de la luna; Rolando Ocampo for La Piloto; Luis Pardo and Eloy Ganuza for Like; Aurelio Ávila, Francisco Franco, and Juan Pablo Blanco for Mi marido tiene familia

=== 2020s ===
Winner	Nominated
38th TVyNovelas Awards
Francisco Franco Alba for La usurpadora	Juan Carlos Muñoz and Rodrigo Curiel for Cita a ciegas; Eric Morales and Juan Pablo Blanco for Cuna de lobos; Claudia Elisa Aguilar and Jorge Robles for Ringo; Benjamín Cann and Fernando Nesme for Vencer el miedo

== Records ==
- Most awarded directors: Miguel Córcega and Mónica Miguel, 6 times
- Directors that won every nomination: Raúl Araiza and Luis Vélez, 2 times.
- Most nominated director: Miguel Córcega with 9 nominations.
- Most nominated directors without a win: Sergio Cataño with 4 nominations.
- Youngest winner: Claudio Reyes Rubio, 30 years old.
- Youngest nominee: Claudio Reyes Rubio, 36 years old.
- Oldest winner: Miguel Córcega, 78 years old.
- Oldest nominee: Jorge Fons, 76 years old.
- Directors winning after short time:
  - Benjamín Cann and Rodrigo Zaunbos by (Por Ella Soy Eva, 2013) and (Mentir para vivir, 2014), 2 consecutive years.
  - Eric Morales and Juan Pablo Blanco by (La candidata, 2017) and (Caer en tentación, 2018), 2 consecutive years.
- Directors winning after long time: Mónica Miguel by (De frente al sol, 1993) and (El manantial, 2002), 9 years difference.
