= Más allá del puente =

Mexican telenovela

- Genre: Telenovela
- Created by: René Muñoz
- Written by: Tere Medina
- Directed by: Mónica Miguel; Miguel Córcega
- Starring: María Sorté; Alfredo Adame
- Opening theme: "Más allá del puente" by María Sorté
- Country of origin: Mexico
- Original language: Spanish
- No. of episodes: 100

Production
- Executive producer: Carla Estrada

Original release
- Network: Canal de las Estrellas
- Release: November 8, 1993 – March 25, 1994

Related
- De frente al sol

Más allá del puente is a Mexican telenovela produced by Carla Estrada for Televisa in 1993. It is a sequel of the 1992 telenovela De frente al sol.

María Sorté and Alfredo Adame star as the main protagonists.

== Cast ==
- María Sorté as Alicia Sandoval
- Alfredo Adame as Eduardo
- Angélica Aragón as Chole
- Katy Jurado as La Jurada
- Susana Alexander as Leonor
- Lilia Aragón as Rosaura
- Ada Carrasco as Lich
- Amairani as Lupita (replaced Itati Cantoral)
- Socorro Avelar as Serafina
- Juan Manuel Bernal as Chinino
- Irán Castillo as Irán
- Fernando Colunga as Valerio
- Miguel Córcega as Hernán
- Eric del Castillo as Daniel
- Carlos Girón as Carlos
- Sergio Kleiner as Adrián
- Ana Bertha Espín as Señora Resendiz
- Omar Fierro as Felipe
- Mónica Miguel as Amaranta
- René Muñoz as Quijano
- Arcelia Ramírez as Carolina
- Eduardo Santamarina as Luis Enrique
- Felicia Mercado as Sara
- Patricia Navidad as Rosalía
- Jorge Russek as Don Fulgencio
- Mauricio Achar as Alex
- Lupita Lara as Úrsula
- Isabel Andrade as Eulalia
- Raúl Askenazi as Joel
- José Carlos Ruiz as Angel
