= Pablo Montero =

Mexican singer and actor

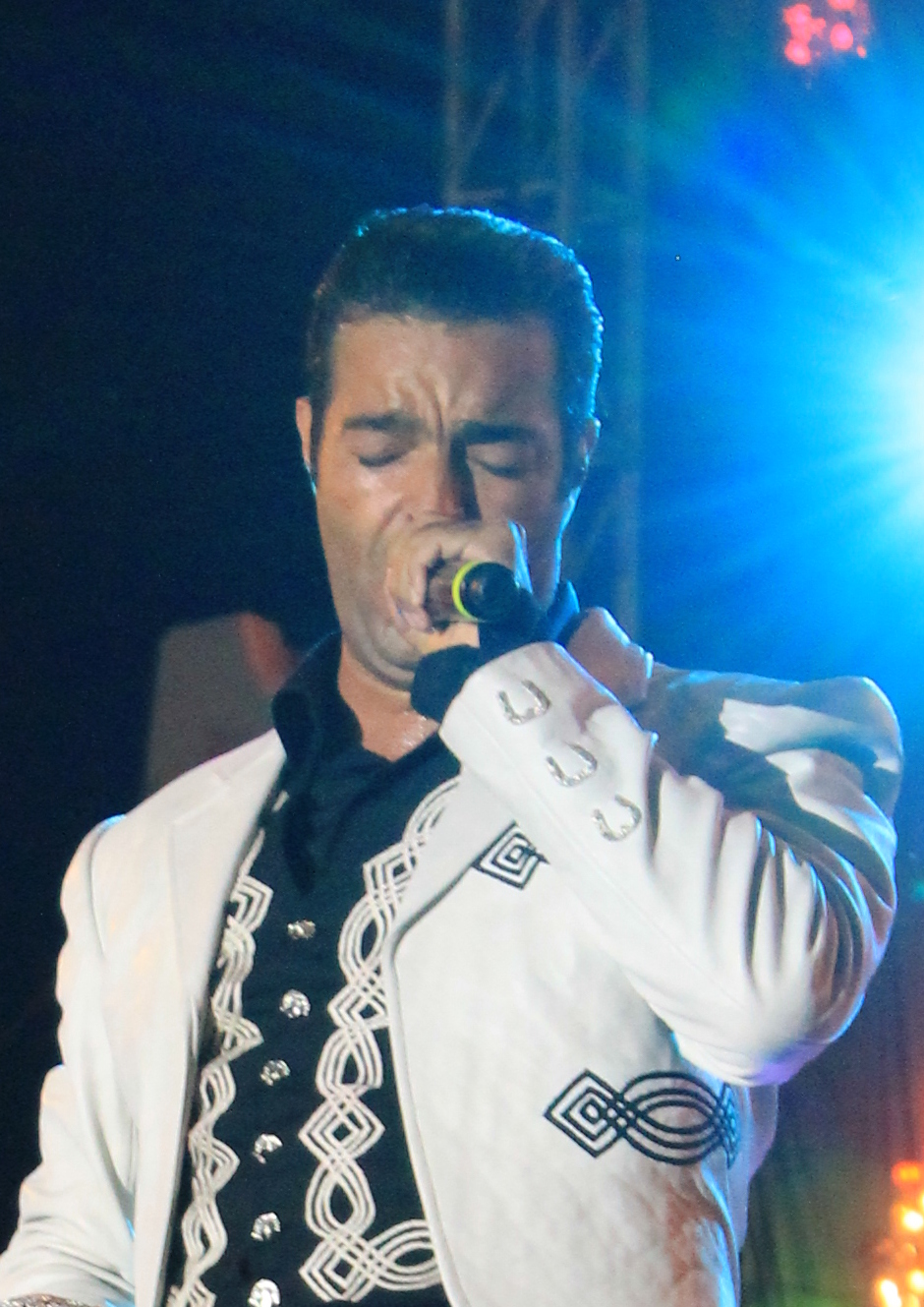
- Pablo Montero performing in Cancún, 2011

Background information
- Also known as: "The Ranchera Hunk"
- Born: Oscar Daniel Hernandez Rodríguez; August 23, 1974 (age 52); Torreón, Coahuila, Mexico
- Genres: Regional Mexican, Latin pop
- Occupations: Singer-songwriter, actor
- Years active: 1990–present
- Label: Univision Records
- Website: Profile at Univision

Pablo Montero (born Óscar Daniel Hernández Rodríguez August 23, 1974) is a Mexican singer and actor. Montero's primary profession is singing, but he also acts regularly in telenovelas produced by Televisa productions in supporting roles. Montero is widely recognized and considered one of the most popular supporting actors in telenovelas.

== Personal life ==
From about 2000 to 2003, Montero had a relationship with Aracely Arámbula. In 2006, there were rumors about a possible romance with his costar in Duelo de Pasiones, Ludwika Paleta, who was married to Mexican actor Plutarco Haza. Montero and Paleta denied the rumors until a video was made public in which they were seen making out. This is said to have caused Ludwika Paleta's separation from her husband. Paleta and Plutarco Haza later reconciled. On August 31, 2007, two days after Montero presented the nominees for the 2007 Latin Grammy Awards, Miami Police reported that they stopped Montero and a passenger after his white BMW SUV ran a red light. During the investigation, police reported discovering a clear bag that tested positive for cocaine, which Montero claimed as his.

However, in court the following month, Montero pleaded not guilty to cocaine possession, was found guilty, and was sentenced to probation, pending completion of a court mandated drug program. Montero was jailed in 2008 for violating the terms of his probation but was released on the condition that he complete a drug rehabilitation program. On February 20, 2009, Montero graduated from his drug treatment program.

He has a son, Daniel Hernandez Piedra, born 22 February 2006 and son Pablo Hernandez Vidal, born in 28.9.2007, with the actress Sandra Vidal and two daughters, Carolina Hernandez Van Wielink born 27.2 2012 and Daniela Hernandez Van Wielink born 24 May 2014 with ex-wife Carolina Van Wielink. In June 2010, his brother Oliver was murdered in an attempted robbery. On June 13, 2013, his brother Javier Hernández was also killed.

== Career ==
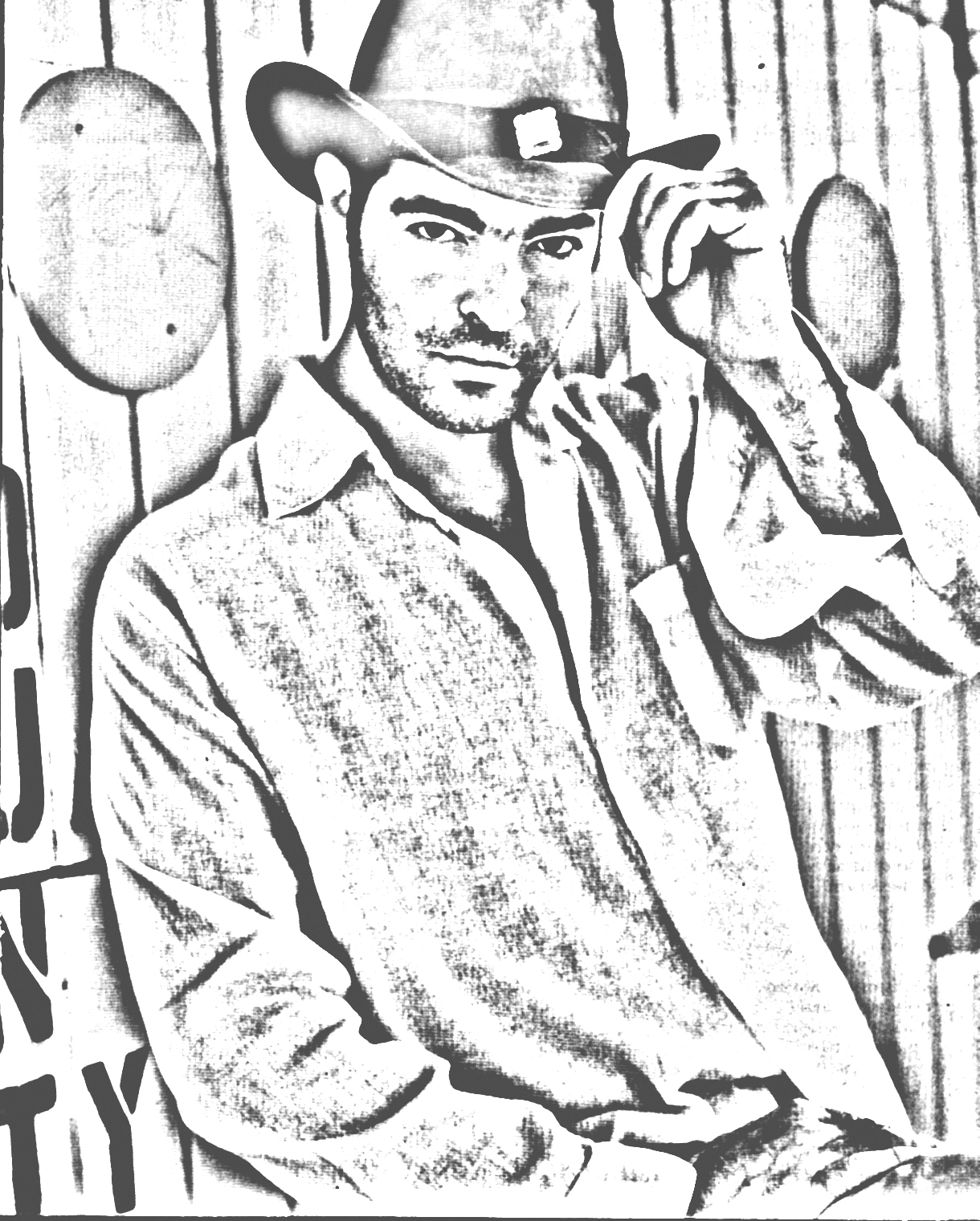
Pablo Montero

Known for his use of "charro" hats and black clothing during his concerts, he is a former teen idol and a paparazzi favorite in Mexico. He is also well known in the rest of Latin America, Australia, Europe, and the Hispanic community of the United States.

When Montero was a teenager, he had his first professional singing job as the lead singer of a group named "Trébol", which had a number one hit titled "Si tu Supieras" ("If You Knew").

Montero opted for a career as a solo artist shortly after this, struggling in local bars and clubs until he got his big break in 1999 when his album Donde Estas, Corazon? (Where Are You, My Love?) became the number one album on Mexico's charts. The album's success launched his image as a "ranchera hunk" and led to his acting debut in Vivo Por Elena (I Live for Elena), where he played a struggling young singer. This was followed by acting roles in Nunca te olvidaré (I Will Never Forget You), Abrázame muy fuerte (Hold me Tight), Rebeca, and Entre el Amor y el Odio.

His 2000 album, the self-titled Pablo Montero produced the number one hit "Que Voy a Hacer sin Ti?" ("What am I Going to do Without You?"). In 2001, Montero joined other artists invited to the White House South Lawn for a Cinco de Mayo fiesta, where he serenaded First Lady Laura Bush. Pablo Montero was followed by 2002's "Pidemelo Todo" ("Ask Me for Everything"), which also included a number one hit single in "Hay Otra en tu Lugar" ("There's Another One in Your Place"). Also in this latter album was the great hit to the soap opera Gata Salvaje, which was titled the same as the soap opera and reached the top ten list on the charts. Later this year he was honored in Australia for his acting as Martin in Rebeca. He has composed the songs for various shows including Olvidarte jamás, Gata Salvaje, La Revancha, Abrázame muy fuerte, Duelo de Pasiones and the controversial movie El Crimen del Padre Amaro.

Montero spent most of 2003 touring and preparing an album that was dedicated to legendary Mexican singer Javier Solís. This album hit the markets later in the year and was well received on a national level. He was involved in a scandal during 2003 because he had apparently not paid his employees during instances that he had not required them, such as when he was on tour, and then fired them when they demanded payment. He lost the case and was forced to pay them a settlement. In 2005, Montero signed a recording contract with Univision Records. In that year, he released his first album for Univision Records, "A Toda Ley."

In 2005, he was featured in an ad campaign by clothing company Hanes with the slogan "Mira quien tiene Hanes" ("Look who has Hanes on now"). He and Aracely Arámbula were both featured in the Spanish-language version of the campaign. In 2006, Montero starred in the Mexican soap opera Duelo de Pasiones, which aired on Univision during 2007. In 2008, Pablo acted in Fuego en le sangre, as Franco Reyes, one of the protagonists of the telenovela, with Eduardo Yáñez and Jorge Salinas. In 2010 he worked in Triunfo del Amor with Victoria Ruffo, Maite Perroni, William Levy, Osvaldo Rios and Daniela Romo.

In mid-2012, a return to the character of "Coloso" in Salvador Mejía it convened to join Qué bonito amor a new version of La hija del mariachi, being his second antagonistic role / main villain next to Jorge, Danna García, Malliany Marin and Juan Ferrara. In 2014, he acted in Mi corazón es tuyo as Diego. Pablo reunited once again with Jorge.

In 2014, he was a special guest acting in Lo imperdonable as Demetrio Silveria, Martin's half brother, costarring with Ana Brenda Contreras and Iván Sánchez.

== Albums ==
- 1999: Donde Estás Corazón
- 2000: Que Voy A Hacer Sin Ti
- 2002: Pídemelo Todo
- 2003: Gracias...Homenaje A Javier Solís
- 2004: Con La Bendición De Dios
- 2005: A Toda Ley
- 2006: Que Bonita Es Mi Tierra
- 2007: Mi Tesoro Norteño
- 2008: Piquito De Oro: Mi Tesoro Norteño
- 2011: El Abandonado

== Filmography ==
Films
Year	Title	Role	Notes
2003	Mamá no te lo pierdas!	Himself	Television film
2005	Selena ¡vive!, acceso total	Himself	Television film
2006	Fiesta Mexicana ¡Un grito de alegría!	Himself	Television film
2007	¡Pedro Infante vive!	Himself	Television film
2014	Prax: un niño especial	Himself	Short film

Television
Year	Title	Role	Notes
1995–1996	Lazos de amor	Óscar Hernández	
1998	Vivo por Elena	Luis Pablo	
1999	Nunca te olvidaré	Álvaro Cordero	
2000–2001	Abrázame muy fuerte	José María Montes	Co-protagonist
2002	Entre el amor y el odio	Ánimas "Alma Caritativa"	
2003	Rebeca	Martín García	
2006	Olvidarte jamás	Himself	Musical guest
2006	Duelo de Pasiones	Emilio Valtierra	
2007	Yo amo a Juan Querendón	Himself	Musical guest
2008	Fuego en la sangre	Franco Reyes	Protagonist
2009	Nuestra belleza latina	Himself	Episode: "The Coaches Eliminate"
2010–2011	Triunfo del amor	Cruz Robles Martínez	
2012–2013	Qué bonito amor	Óscar Fernández	Supporting role/ villain
2014–2015	Mi corazón es tuyo	Diego Lascurain	Supporting role
2015	Lo imperdonable	Demetrio Silveria	Guest star; 3 episodes
2019–2020	Soltero con hijas	Rodrigo Montero	
2022	El último rey	Vicente Fernández	Main role

== Awards and nominations ==
=== TVyNovelas Awards ===
Year	Category	Telenovela	Result
1999	Best Co-star Actor	Vivo por Elena	Nominated
2001	Best Co-star Actor	Abrázame muy fuerte	Won

== Compilations ==
- Entrega Total...Los Éxitos (2005)
