= Abrázame muy fuerte (TV series) =

2000–2001 Mexican telenovela

- Genre: Telenovela
- Created by: René Muñoz
- Written by: Liliana Abud
- Story by: Caridad Bravo Adams
- Directed by: Miguel Córcega; Víctor Manuel Fouilloux; Édgar Ramírez
- Starring: Victoria Ruffo; Fernando Colunga; Aracely Arámbula; César Évora; Nailea Norvind; Osvaldo Ríos
- Theme music composer: Juan Gabriel; Eduardo Magallanes
- Opening theme: "Abrázame muy fuerte" performed by Juan Gabriel
- Ending theme: "Niña y mujer" performed by Aracely Arámbula
- Composer: Jorge Avendaño
- Country of origin: Mexico
- Original language: Spanish
- No. of episodes: 135

Production
- Executive producer: Salvador Mejía Alejandre
- Producer: Nathalie Lartilleux
- Cinematography: María Teresa Ortíz
- Editor: Marco Antonio Rocha
- Camera setup: Multi-camera

Original release
- Release: July 31, 2000 – February 2, 2001

Related
- Pecado mortal; Que te perdone Dios

Abrázame muy fuerte (Embrace Me) is a Mexican telenovela that aired from July 2000 to February 2001, under the production of Salvador Mejía Alejandre.

It stars Victoria Ruffo, Fernando Colunga, Aracely Arámbula, César Évora, Nailea Norvind and Osvaldo Ríos.

== Plot ==
Cristina (Victoria Ruffo) is a sweet and tender young girl, loved by everyone in "El Platanal", a beautiful estate owned by Don Severiano Álvarez (Joaquín Cordero), her father, a tough country man with a rigid character. Diego Hernández (Osvaldo Ríos), a strong young man who has fallen in love with Cristina, works as a foreman in this place. Given the love that Cristina also feels for Diego, she gives herself to him. Cristina confesses to her father that she is pregnant and that she loves Diego.

Severiano orders that Cristina and Raquela (Rossana San Juan), the maid, go to the capital for his daughter to have the child there. Due to the manipulations of Federico Rivero (César Évora), little María del Carmen returns to the estate as Raquela's daughter. Cristina, in order to be close to her daughter, is forced to marry Federico, a ruthless and ambitious man. From now on, before everyone's eyes, she will be the godmother of María del Carmen. Federico causes an accident as a result of which Cristina loses her sight; thus, her fortune passes into his hands.

Federico is happy with the arrival of his nephew, Carlos Manuel (Fernando Colunga), a handsome young man who has finished his medical studies abroad. Carlos Manuel falls in love with Déborah Falcón (Nailea Norvind), without knowing that she is the lover of his uncle. When Federico finds out about this relationship, he opposes it and looks for a way to separate Déborah from his nephew.

Simultaneously, the now adolescent María del Carmen (Aracely Arámbula) falls in love with Carlos Manuel from the moment she meets him, provoking the hatred of Déborah who, along with Federico, does everything possible to break up the young couple, managing to drift them apart, but without being able to make the love they feel for each other go out.

Carlos Manuel gets Ángel Luis Robles (Arnaldo André), his teacher and friend who is a specialist in ophthalmology, to analyze Cristina's case of blindness so that he can help him operate on her. Dr. Robles secretly falls in love with her and has a vested interest in her regaining her sight. Federico, eager to possess María del Carmen at any cost, tries to sexually abuse the young woman, but Cristina prevents it.

This awesome story, in which the purest feelings of the human being are shown, leads us to a series of surprises and emotions giving way to true love; the love that can only be felt when saying Embrace Me.

== Cast ==
=== Main ===
- Victoria Ruffo as Cristina
- Fernando Colunga as Carlos Manuel
- Aracely Arámbula as María del Carmen
- César Évora as Federico
- Nailea Norvind as Déborah
- Osvaldo Ríos as Diego

==== Recurring and guest stars ====
- Arnaldo André as Dr. Robles
- Helena Rojo as Damiana
- Alicia Rodríguez as Consuelo
- Emilia Guiú as Flora
- Joaquín Cordero as Severiano
- Rosita Quintana as Eduviges
- Lilia Aragón as Efigenia
- René Muñoz as Regino
- Alicia Montoya as Gumersinda
- Dacia González as Candelaria
- Pablo Montero as José María
- Rossana San Juan as Raquela
- Tina Romero as Jacinta
- Aurora Clavel as Vicenta
- Miguel Córcega as Father Ignacio
- Eduardo Noriega as Pancho
- Liza Willert as Clementina
- Mario Casillas as Mayor / Marcelino
- Toño Infante as Eulogio
- Ignacio Guadalupe as Benito
- Alejandro Villeli as Butler
- Verónika con K as Casilda
- Dacia Arcaráz as Gema
- Eduardo Rodríguez as Max
- José Antonio Ferral as Fayo Ruiz
- Jorge de Silva as Abelito
- Ricardo Chávez as Motor
- Esther Rinaldi as Nieves
- Emely Faride as Paquita
- Shirley as Florencia
- Patricia Ramírez as Patricia
- Paco Ibáñez as Juancho
- Pedro Romo as Apolinar
- Humberto Elizondo as Bernal
- Fabián Lavalle as Dr. Anaya
- Alberto Inzúa as Porfirio
- René Casados as Francisco José
- Toño Mauri as Father Moisés
- Carlos Amador as Nicolás
- Raúl Buenfil as El Dandy
- Rosita Pelayo as La Güera
- Sergio Reynoso as Hernán
- Manuel Capetillo as Miguel Salvador Zamudio
- Lalo "El Mimo" as Casimiro
- Carmen Salinas as Celia Ramos
- Don Ernesto Alonso as Father Bosco

== Awards and nominations ==
Year	Award	Category	Nominee(s)	Result
2001	TVyNovelas Awards			
2001	TVyNovelas Awards	Best Telenovela	Salvador Mejía Alejandre	Won
2001	TVyNovelas Awards	Best Actress	Aracely Arámbula	Nominated
2001	TVyNovelas Awards	Best Actor	Fernando Colunga	Won
2001	TVyNovelas Awards	Best Antagonist Actress	Nailea Norvind	Won
2001	TVyNovelas Awards	Best Antagonist Actor	César Évora	Won
2001	TVyNovelas Awards	Best Leading Actress	Helena Rojo	Won
2001	TVyNovelas Awards	Best Leading Actor	César Évora	Nominated
2001	TVyNovelas Awards	Best Leading Actor	Joaquín Cordero	Won
2001	TVyNovelas Awards	Best Supporting Actress	Carmen Salinas	Nominated
2001	TVyNovelas Awards	Best Supporting Actor	Pablo Montero	Won
2001	TVyNovelas Awards	Best Male Revelation	Pablo Montero	Nominated
2001	TVyNovelas Awards	Best Musical Theme	"Abrázame muy fuerte" by Juan Gabriel	Nominated
2001	TVyNovelas Awards	Best Original Story or Adaptation	Liliana Abud	Won
2001	TVyNovelas Awards	Best Direction	Miguel Córcega	Won
2001	TVyNovelas Awards	Best Kiss	Aracely Arámbula; Fernando Colunga	Nominated
2001	TVyNovelas Awards	Best Fight	César Évora; Pablo Montero	Nominated
2001	TVyNovelas Awards	Best Action Sequence	Fernando Colunga	Nominated
2001	El Heraldo de México Awards			
2001	El Heraldo de México Awards	Best Telenovela	Salvador Mejía Alejandre	Won
2001	El Heraldo de México Awards	Best Actress	Aracely Arámbula	Won
2001	El Heraldo de México Awards	Best Actor	Fernando Colunga	Won
2001	El Heraldo de México Awards	Best Musical Theme	"Abrázame muy fuerte" by Juan Gabriel	Won
2002	Latin ACE Awards			
2002	Latin ACE Awards	Best Actress	Aracely Arámbula	Won
2002	Latin ACE Awards	Best Actor	Fernando Colunga	Won
2002	Latin ACE Awards	Best Supporting Actor	César Évora	Won
2002	Latin ACE Awards	Best Direction	Miguel Córcega	Won

== International broadcast ==
=== Brazil ===
In Brazil, the telenovela was dubbed into Portuguese and broadcast by SBT as "Abraça-me muito forte" at 2001.

=== Indonesia ===
In Indonesia, the telenovela was dubbed into Indonesian and broadcast by SCTV as "Carmenita" from late 2000 to early 2001 every Monday to Friday at 5 p.m.

=== Lebanon ===
In Lebanon, it was dubbed into Arabic (Levantine Arabic) and broadcast by LBCI as "أبقى معي" (Abqā Maʿī, meaning "Stay with Me") at 2001.

=== Philippines ===
In the Philippines, it was dubbed into Tagalog and broadcast by GMA Network as "Maria del Carmen" from November 17, 2003 to May 20, 2004.

=== United Kingdom and Australia ===
In the United Kingdom, it was dubbed into English and broadcast by Channel 4 as "Hold Me Tight" from late 2001 to early 2002, also changes few character names e.g. Carmen became Carmel, Cristina became Christina, Federico became Frederick, Raquela became Rachel, José María became Joseph Mary.

In Australia, it has the same broadcasting like in United Kingdom, but broadcast by Seven Network at 2002.

== Remake ==
In 2015, Angelli Nesma Medina produced Que te perdone Dios for Televisa. Zuria Vega, Mark Tacher, Sergio Goyri and Rebecca Jones were cast as main protagonists.
