= Verónika con K =

Mexican actress, singer and TV hostess (born 1950)

- Born: Nicanora Verónica Hernández Ávila; February 14, 1950 (age 75); Santo Domingo, Oaxaca, Mexico
- Occupation(s): Actress, singer, TV hostess
- Years active: 1975–present
- Children: 2

Verónika con K (born Nicanora Verónica Hernández Ávila on February 14, 1950) is a Mexican actress, singer and TV hostess.

Verónika con K was born in Santo Domingo, Oaxaca, Mexico. She made her debut in the 1975 film Satânico Pandemonium. She also appeared in the films El guía de las turistas, ¡Oye Salomé!, La mujer del puerto and Hembras de tierra caliente.

In 1989 she appeared in a children's TV series, Carrusel, as Belén. She was also in Marisol, El Privilegio de Amar, Abrázame muy fuerte and Mariana de la noche.

In 2016 Verónika con K celebrated 45 years in show business.

In 2017 she returned to telenovelas in El vuelo de la victoria as Chencha, mother of Paulina Goto.

== Filmography ==
Year	Title	Role	Notes
1975	Satânico Pandemonium		Film
1976	El guía de las turistas		Film
1978	¡Oye Salomé!		Film
1986	Chispas de chocolate		1 episode
1989	La mujer del puerto		Film
1989/90	Carrusel	Belén de Rivera	Supporting role
1991	Hembras de tierra caliente		Film
1996	Marisol	Zalmudia	Recurring role
1996	Mi querida Isabel		
1997	Mi pequeña traviesa		
1998/99	El Privilegio de Amar	Caridad	Recurring role
2000/01	Abrázame muy fuerte	Casilda	Recurring role
2003	Velo de novia		
2003	Bajo la misma piel	Liz	Recurring role
2003/04	Mariana de la noche	Ruth Samanéz	Recurring role
2005/06	Alborada	Carmen	
2006/07	Muévete	Herself/hostess	TV show
2007	Destilando Amor		
2008	S.O.S.: Sexo y otros Secretos	Telenovela Actress	1 episode
2010/15	La rosa de Guadalupe	Agnes/Delphine	2 episodes
2017	El vuelo de la victoria	Crescencia "Chencha" Tonantzin	Supporting role
