= El Privilegio de Amar =

Mexican telenovela

- Genre: Telenovela
- Created by: Liliana Abud
- Based on: Cristal by Delia Fiallo
- Written by: Liliana Abud; Ricardo Fiallega; Marta Jurado
- Directed by: Miguel Córcega; Mónica Miguel
- Starring: Adela Noriega; Helena Rojo; Andrés García; Enrique Rocha; René Strickler; Cynthia Klitbo; Nuria Bages; César Évora
- Theme music composer: Jorge Avendaño
- Opening theme: "El privilegio de amar" by Mijares & Lucero
- Country of origin: Mexico
- Original language: Spanish
- No. of episodes: 155

Production
- Executive producer: Carla Estrada
- Producer: Arturo Lorca
- Production locations: Televisa San Ángel; Mexico City, Mexico
- Cinematography: Alejandro Frutos; Jesús Acuña Lee
- Editors: Juan Franco; Luis Horacio Valdés
- Camera setup: Multi-camera
- Running time: 41-44 minutes
- Production company: Televisa

Original release
- Network: Canal de las Estrellas
- Release: July 27, 1998 – February 26, 1999

Related
- Triunfo del amor (2010); Los hilos del pasado (2025)

El privilegio de amar (Literal English translation: The Privilege to Love, International English title: The Right to Love) is a Mexican telenovela produced by Carla Estrada for Televisa. It aired on Canal de las Estrellas from July 27, 1998 to February 26, 1999. El privilegio de amar is a remake of the 1985 Venezuelan telenovela Cristal. El privilegio de amar is the highest-rated television program in Mexico to date; it registered an average of 34.8 percent of TV audience. The telenovela received the TVyNovelas Award for Best Telenovela in 1999.

The telenovela tells the story of Luciana, a fashion designer who begins searching for the daughter she abandoned years earlier, unaware that the girl is none other than Cristina, a model in Luciana's fashion house who has fallen in love with her stepson.

It stars Adela Noriega, Helena Rojo, Andrés García, Enrique Rocha, René Strickler, Cynthia Klitbo, Nuria Bages and César Évora.

== Plot ==
The young seminarian Juan de la Cruz (Andrés Gutiérrez) arrives for a visit at the home of his mother, Ana Joaquina (Diana Bracho), a religious fanatic who has always imposed her will upon her son and pushed him to serve God. Working in Ana Joaquina's house is the young Luciana (Edith Márquez), a naive and dreamy girl who falls in love with Juan de la Cruz.

One night, carried away by youthful passion, they tenderly and innocently give in to their desires. Upon discovering that Luciana is pregnant, Ana Joaquina demands to know the identity of the child's father; when Luciana admits that it is Juan de la Cruz, Ana Joaquina fires Luciana, leaving her destitute.

After giving birth to a daughter, Luciana leaves her baby on the doorstep of a wealthy house with the hope that the little girl will be raised there, but she is instead taken to an orphanage. In order to survive, Luciana becomes involved with many undesirable men, including Pedro Trujillo (Pedro Weber "Chatanuga"), a terrible man who beats and abuses her.

Twenty years later, Cristina (Adela Noriega), Luciana's daughter, has grown up happily in the orphanage, although she has always been curious to know who her mother was; meanwhile, Luciana (Helena Rojo) is the owner of a popular fashion house and the wife of the well-known actor Andrés Duval (Andrés García), with whom she has two children, Lizbeth (Adriana Nieto) and Víctor Manuel (René Strickler).

Lizbeth, who is Luciana and Andrés' daughter, is whimsical and spoiled because she is accustomed to always having what she wants, while Víctor Manuel, who is Andrés' son from his first marriage, is like a son to Luciana and works at her fashion house.

Her happy and caring family makes Luciana begin searching for the daughter she abandoned many years ago; however, her family knows nothing about Cristina because Luciana has never revealed a single detail about her past out of fear of her husband's reaction. Cristina, upon leaving the orphanage, rents a small apartment along with Lorenza (Sabine Moussier) and Maclovia (Isadora González).

Lorenza is a beautiful young woman, provocative and very self-confident, whereas Maclovia is reserved, timid and intelligent. Lorenza meets Andrés and they become lovers as Andrés comes to desire the passion and love that Luciana never gave him; meanwhile, thanks to Lorenza, Cristina obtains a job as a model in Luciana's fashion house.

Cristina and Víctor Manuel fall in love and begin to date, but when Luciana learns about their relationship, she fires Cristina and tries to convince her son that he should marry Tamara (Cynthia Klitbo), who traps him with the lie that she is expecting a baby of his when, in fact, that baby is from Nicolás Obregón (Enrique Rocha), a friend of Andrés.

Cristina finds out that she is pregnant by Víctor Manuel but decides to remain silent out of respect for the family that he has formed. At this point, Alonso (Toño Mauri) comes into Cristina's life, offering her a name for her daughter and love for her; however, Cristina cannot reciprocate his feelings because she does not love him.

Over time, Cristina begins to fight for her daughter and becomes a successful woman. The status that she little by little gains as a model unites her again with Víctor Manuel who, living a life with Tamara, plans to leave her in order to be happy with Cristina and thus be able to enjoy together The Right to Love.

== Cast ==
=== Main ===
- Adela Noriega as Cristina Miranda
- Helena Rojo as Luciana Hernández de Duval
  - Edith Márquez as Young Luciana Hernández
- Andrés García as Andrés Duval
- Enrique Rocha as Nicolás Obregón
- René Strickler as Víctor Manuel Duval
- Cynthia Klitbo as Tamara de la Colina
- Nuria Bages as Miriam Arango
- César Évora as Father Juan de la Cruz Velarde
  - Andrés Gutiérrez Coto as Young Juan de la Cruz Velarde

=== Also main ===
- Mauricio Herrera as Franco
- Claudio Báez as Cristóbal
- Ramón Abascal as José María "Chema" López Ramos
- Sabine Moussier as Lorenza Torres
- Isadora González as Maclovia
- Adriana Nieto as Lizbeth Duval
- Pedro Weber "Chatanuga" as Pedro Trujillo
- Marga López as Ana Joaquina Velarde
  - Diana Bracho as Young Ana Joaquina Velarde

=== Recurring and guest stars ===
- Octavio Acosta as Doctor
- Guillermo Aguilar as Walter Gruber
- Ana María Aguirre as Sister Regina
- Beatriz Aguirre as herself
- Sheriff Alarcón as himself
- María Luisa Alcalá as Remedios Ramos
- Alfredo Alfonso as Doctor
- Aurora Alonso as Imelda Salazar
- Carlos Amador Jr. as Fidencio
- Yolanda Andrade as herself
- Roberto Antúnez as Father Marcelo
- Lilia Aragón as herself
- Marta Aura as Josefina "Chepa" Pérez
- Socorro Avelar as Rosa Hernández
- Francisco Avendaño as Dr. Jaime Dávila
- Manuel Ávila as Doctor
- Ángeles Balvanera as Petrona
- Katie Barberi as Paula
- Estela Barona as Gladiola
- Kuno Becker as himself
- Miguel Ángel Biaggio as Pancho
- José Ramón Blanch as Guard
- Óscar Βonfiglio as Fernando Bernal
- Raúl Buenfil as El Fresco
- Abril Campillo as La Güera
- Yadhira Carrillo as María José
- René Casados as himself
- Mario Casillas as Miguel Beltrán
- César Castro as Doctor
- Chela Castro as herself
- Verónika con K as Caridad
- Miguel Córcega as himself
- Gabriel de Cervantes as Ramiro García
- Gustavo del Castillo as Commander
- Marisol del Olmo as Antonia "Toña" Fonseca
- Jorge de Marín as Doctor
- Ricardo de Pascual as Dr. Heriberto Sevilla
- Rosa Elena Díaz as Luciana's lawyer
- Consuelo Duval as María Rosenda Sánchez
- Jean Duverger as Exposímetro
- Carla Estrada as herself
- José Antonio Ferral as Police officer
- Paola Flores as Juanita
- Esteban Franco as Police officer
- Virgilio García as Negro
- Susana González as herself
- Maribel Guardia as herself
- Lucía Guilmáin as Prisoner
- Arturo Guízar as Lawyer Guízar
- Tito Guízar as Agustín Gómez
- Virginia Gutiérrez as Sister Bernardina
- Ángel Heredia as Clerk
- Nelly Horsman as Cata
- Maty Huitrón as Bárbara Rivera
- Gustavo Adolfo Infante as himself
- Benjamín Islas as Raúl
- Martha Itzel as Dulce
- Ismael Larumbre as Doctor
- Néstor Leoncio as Dr. Ávila
- Mario Limantour as Sebas
- Eduardo Liñán as Dr. Valladares
- Saúl Lisazo as himself
- Eduardo López Rojas as Shaman
- Arturo Lorca as Don Isaís
- Rebeca Mankita as herself
- Silvia Manríquez as Luz María
- Beatriz Martínez as herself
- Toño Mauri as Alonso del Ángel
- Ramón Menéndez as Erasmo de la Colina
- Rafael Mercadante as Mauricio Trujillo
- Felicia Mercado as herself
- Ricky Mergold as Tobías "Tobi"
- Manuel Mijares as himself
- Mitzy as himself
- Pilar Montenegro as herself
- Julio Monterde as Father Celorio
- Beatriz Moreno as Doña Charo
- Fernando Morín as Priest
- Bertha Moss as herself
- Lourdes Munguía as Ofelia Ruvalcaba
- José María Napoleón as Silverio Jiménez
- Patricia Navidad as herself
- María Dolores Oliva as Woman in park
- Juan José Origel as himself
- Héctor Ortega as Valentín Fonseca
- Baltazar Oviedo as El Fresco's friend
- Arlette Pacheco as Begoña
- Alfredo Palacios as himself
- Héctor Parra as Lawyer Sandoval
- Arturo Paulet as Vigorito
- Genoveva Pérez as Chole
- Silvia Pinal as herself
- Dalilah Polanco as Casilda
- Polly as Hair salon owner
- Roberto Porter as Employee
- Anaís Salazar as Gisela
- Dolores Salomón as Woman in boutique
- Marisol Santacruz as herself
- Yamil Sesín as Client
- Claudia Silva as Lourdes Galindo
- María Sorté as Vivian del Ángel
- Héctor Suárez as himself
- Andrea Torre as Alejandra
- Gastón Tuset as Alfonso
- Luis Uribe as Raymundo Velarde
- Arturo Vázquez as Macario Jiménez
- Lorena Velázquez as Rebeca de la Colina
- Ricardo Vera as Doctor
- Rodrigo Vidal as Artemio Salazar
- Mayrín Villanueva as herself
- Jacqueline Voltaire as Jacqueline
- Maxine Woodside as herself
- Luis Xavier as Alberto Souza
- Rocío Yaber as Judge
- Sergio Zaldívar as Doctor
- Gustavo Zárate as Doctor

== Awards and nominations ==
Year	Award	Category	Nominee	Result
1999	17th TVyNovelas Awards	Best Telenovela	Carla Estrada	Won
1999	17th TVyNovelas Awards	Best Actress	Helena Rojo	Won
1999	17th TVyNovelas Awards	Best Actor	Andrés García	Won
1999	17th TVyNovelas Awards	Best Antagonist Actress	Cynthia Klitbo	Won
1999	17th TVyNovelas Awards	Best Antagonist Actor	Enrique Rocha	Won
1999	17th TVyNovelas Awards	Best Leading Actress	Marga López	Won
1999	17th TVyNovelas Awards	Best Supporting Actor	César Évora	Won
1999	17th TVyNovelas Awards	Best Young Lead Actress	Adela Noriega	Won
1999	17th TVyNovelas Awards	Best Young Lead Actor	René Strickler	Nominated
1999	17th TVyNovelas Awards	Best Revelation	Sabine Moussier	Won
1999	17th TVyNovelas Awards	Best Musical Theme	"El privilegio de amar" by Mijares and Lucero	Won
1999	17th TVyNovelas Awards	Best Musical Theme Composer	Jorge Avendaño	Won
1999	17th TVyNovelas Awards	Best Direction	Miguel Córcega; Mónica Miguel	Won
1999	Bravo Awards	Best Telenovela	Carla Estrada	Won
1999	Bravo Awards	Best Antagonist Actress	Cynthia Klitbo	Won
1999	Bravo Awards	Best Female Revelation	Sabine Moussier	Won
1999	Califa de Oro Awards	Outstanding Production	Carla Estrada	Won
1999	Califa de Oro Awards	Outstanding Performance	Adela Noriega	Won
1999	Califa de Oro Awards	Outstanding Performance	Andrés García	Won
1999	Califa de Oro Awards	Outstanding Performance	Enrique Rocha	Won
1999	Califa de Oro Awards	Outstanding Performance	Helena Rojo	Won
1999	Califa de Oro Awards	Outstanding Performance	Maty Huitrón	Won
1999	Califa de Oro Awards	Outstanding Performance	Mauricio Herrera	Won
1999	Califa de Oro Awards	Outstanding Performance	Ramón Abascal	Won
1999	Califa de Oro Awards	Outstanding Performance	René Strickler	Won
1999	Califa de Oro Awards	Outstanding Performance	Sabine Moussier	Won
1999	Califa de Oro Awards	Outstanding Performance	Toño Mauri	Won
1999	Califa de Oro Awards	Best Adaptation	Liliana Abud	Won
2003	Latin ACE Awards	Best Telenovela	El privilegio de amar	Won
2003	Latin ACE Awards	Best Actress	Adela Noriega	Won
2003	Latin ACE Awards	Best Supporting Actress	Cynthia Klitbo	Won
2003	Latin ACE Awards	Most Outstanding Character Actress	Marga López	Won
2003	Latin ACE Awards	Most Outstanding Character Actor	Enrique Rocha	Won
