= Alfredo Adame =

Mexican actor and producer (born 1958)

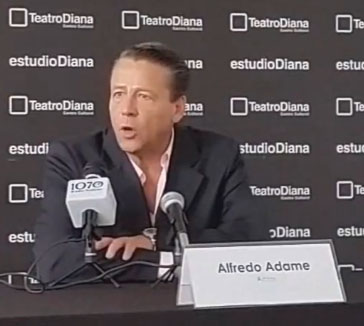
- Born: Alfredo Adame Von Knoop; 10 June 1958 (age 67); Guadalajara, Jalisco, Mexico
- Occupation(s): Actor, producer, host
- Years active: 1980–present

Alfredo Adame (Spanish pronunciation: [alˈfɾeðo aˈðame]; born Alfredo Adame Von Knoop on 10 June 1958) is a Mexican actor, producer, and host.

== Filmography ==
=== Films ===
Year	Title	Role	Notes
1987	Fuga al destino		Film debut
1992	Anatomía de una violación		
1993	Dos fantasmas sinvergüenzas		
1993	El salario de la muerte	Jorge	
1994	Perfume, efecto inmediato		
1995	Los cómplices del infierno		
1996	En las manos de Dios		
1999	Reclusorio III		

=== Television ===
Year	Title	Role	Notes
1988	Videocosmos	Himself	Host
1989	Mi segunda madre	Hans	
1990	Balada por un amor	Gustavo Elenes	
1990	La fuerza del amor	Felipe	
1991	Yo no creo en los hombres	Gustavo Miranda	
1992	De frente al sol	Eduardo	
1993	Videoteatros: Véngan corriendo que les tengo un muerto		
1993-1994	Más allá del puente	Eduardo	
1995	Bajo un mismo rostro	Diego	
1995-1996	Retrato de familia	Dr. Esteban Acuña	
1996	Tú y yo	Carlos Augusto Beltrán	
1997	Mujer, casos de la vida real		"El regalo" (Season 13, Episode 5)
1997	Alguna vez tendremos alas	Carlos Augusto	
1998-2002	Hoy	Himself	Host
2000	DKDA: Sueños de juventud	Worker	
2001	María Belén	Alfonso García Marín	
2002	Las vías del amor	Ricardo Domínguez	
2002	Viva la mañana	Himself	Host
2003	¡Ay, amor!	Himself	Host
2004	Don Francisco Presenta	Himself	Archive footage
2005	La pareja más pareja	Himself	Host
2002	Viva la mañana	Himself	Host
2005	La madrastra	Presentador	
2006	Súper mamá	Himself	Host
2008-2009	En nombre del amor	Rafael Sáenz	
2009	Sortilegio	Det. John Seagal	"Investigador al rescate" (Season 1, Episode 72)
2010-2011	Cuando me enamoro	Honorio Sánchez	
2011-2012	Dos Hogares	Armando Garza	
2011-2012	Como dice el dicho	Leo	"Contigo la milpa es rancho" (Season 1, Episode 21); "Amor de padre" (Season 2, Episode 36)
2012-2013	La mujer del Vendaval	Luciano Casteló	
2013-2014	Lo que la vida me robó	Benjamín Almonte	"Benjamín agoniza" (Season 1, Episode 1); "Oferta de Alejandro" (Season 1, Episode 4); "Dimitrio corre a Graciela" (Season 1, Episode 164)
2014-2015	La sombra del pasado	Padre Jerónimo Alcocer	
2015	A que no me dejas	Alfonso Fonseca Cortes	
2016	Las amazonas	Vicente Mendoza Castro	Guest star
2017	La doble vida de Estela Carrillo	Pedro Carrillo González	Guest star
2018	Por amar sin ley	Hugo	Guest star
2021	Perdiendo el juicio	Himself	Episode: "Alfredo Adame"
2022	Tal para cual	Himself	Episode: "El tatuaje fantasma"
2024-2025	La casa de los famosos	Himself	Houseguest (seasons 4–5)
2025	La Granja VIP	Himself	

=== As producer ===
Year	Title	Notes
2005	Viva la mañana	Producer
2007	Matutino Express	Producer
