= Orlando Miguel =

Cuban-Mexican actor

Orlando Miguel Rojas González (born July 18, 1969, in Havana, Cuba) is a Cuban-Mexican actor. He made his small-screen debut as the character Osvaldo Larrea in Lazos de Amor, alongside Lucero.

== Filmography ==
- Where Birds Go To Die (2022) ... Roberto
- Tierra de Reyes (2015) TV Series ..... Jack Malkovich
- Tu Voz Estereo (2011)
- Mujeres al Limite (2010)
- Terapia de Pareja (2010)
- Salvador de mujeres (2010) TV Series .... Felipe
- Rosario Tijeras (2010) TV Series .... Mr.Robinson
- Tiempo Final (2009) TV Series .... Agent Rodriguez
- La Marca del Deseo (2008) TV Series .... Alfredo Pardo
- Lorena (2005) TV Series .... Gerardo Ferrero
- Ángel de la guarda, mi dulce compañía (2003) TV Series .... Fernando
- La Venganza (2002) TV Series .... Felipe Valerugo Rangel
- Cómplices al rescate (2002) TV Series .... Pepe
- Carita de ángel (2000) TV Series
- DKDA: Sueños de juventud (1999) TV Series .... Jerónimo
- El niño que vino del mar (1999) TV Series .... Enrique Cáceres de Ribera
- Ángela (1998) TV Series .... Pedro Solórzano Mateos
- Una luz en el camino (1998) TV Series .... Miguel
- Pueblo chico, infierno grande (1997) TV Series .... Palemón Morales (father and son)
- Sentimientos Ajenos (1996) TV Series .... Darío
- Lazos de Amor (1996) TV Series .... Osvaldo Larrea
