= Lazos de Amor =

Mexican telenovela

- Genre: Telenovela
- Created by: Carmen Daniels
- Written by: Carmen Daniels; Tere Medina
- Screenplay by: Carmen Daniels
- Story by: Jorge Lozano Soriano
- Directed by: Miguel Córcega; Monica Miguel
- Starring: Lucero; Luis José Santander
- Theme music composer: José Cantoral
- Opening theme: "Lazos de amor" performed by Lucero
- Country of origin: Mexico
- Original language: Spanish
- No. of episodes: 100

Production
- Executive producer: Carla Estrada
- Producer: Arturo Lorca
- Cinematography: Isabel Basurto; Alejandro Frutos
- Editors: Juan Franco; Antonio Trejo
- Camera setup: Multi-camera
- Production company: Televisa

Original release
- Network: Canal de las Estrellas
- Release: 2 October 1995 – 23 February 1996

Related
- Tres veces Ana

Lazos de amor (English title: Τies of Love) is a Mexican telenovela produced by Carla Estrada for Televisa in 1995. It stars Lucero and Luis José Santander.

== Plot ==
The series centers around María Guadalupe, María Paula and María Fernanda, identical triplets (all played by Lucero) with non-identical, complex personalities. When they all were very young, they were victims of a car accident that killed their parents.

As a result of the accident, María Guadalupe is presumed dead when she disappears after falling into a river. Instead, she develops amnesia and forgets she has a family and two sisters. Ana Salas, who is going through a tragedy coping with her own mother's death, raises María Guadalupe as her own, even after becoming aware of her true identity.

María Fernanda is a sweet girl who hopes to find her sister, but as a result of the accident is left blind. María Paula is different from her sisters in that she's glamorous, selfish and extremely jealous; however, she also harbors a devastating secret about the accident.

After an illness brings María Guadalupe and Ana to México City, María Guadalupe falls in love with Nicolás, a cab driver and good-hearted man, who had just moved to México to live with his grandmother. Living in fear that someone may recognize her daughter, Ana restricts María Guadalupe's actions, but Nicolás's grandmother learns Ana's secret without saying a word.

The girls' grandmother, Mercedes, and their uncle, Eduardo, have been searching for missing María Guadalupe for years, and the story inches closer and closer to the revelation of the truth as the ties of love eventually draw the three sisters together, weaving through the lives of those that surround them in unexpected ways.

== Cast ==
=== Main ===
- Lucero as María Guadalupe Rivas Iturbe / María Fernanda Rivas Iturbe / María Paula Rivas Iturbe / Laura Iturbe de Rivas
- Luis José Santander as Nicolás Miranda

=== Also main ===
- Marga López as Mercedes Viuda de Iturbe
- Luis Bayardo as Edmundo Sandoval
- Demián Bichir as Valente Segura
- Maty Huitrón as Ana Salas
- Felicia Mercado as Nancy Balboa
- Guillermo Murray as Alejandro Molina
- Ana Luisa Peluffo as Aurora Campos
- Otto Sirgo as Eduardo Rivas
- Juan Manuel Bernal as Gerardo Sandoval
- Bárbara Córcega as Flor
- Crystal as Soledad Jiménez
- Nerina Ferrer as Irene
- Mariana Karr as Susana Ferreira
- Verónica Merchant as Virginia Altamirano
- Alejandra Peniche as Julieta
- Angélica Vale as Teresa "Tere"
- Guillermo Zarur as Professor Mariano López
- Orlando Miguel as Osvaldo Larrea

=== Recurring and guest stars ===
- Guillermo Aguilar as Pablo Altamirano
- Emma Teresa Armendáriz as Felisa
- Enrique Becker as Sergio
- Rozenda Bernal as Sonia
- Leticia Calderón as Silvia Pinal's assistant
- Víctor Carpinteiro as Javier
- Eugenio Cobo as himself
- Juan Carlos Colombo as Samuel Levy
- Luis de Icaza as Gordo
- Eric del Castillo as Priest
- Eugenio Derbez as himself
- Luis García as himself
- Ernesto Laguardia as Bernardo Rivas
- Monica Miguel as Chole
- Pablo Montero as himself
- Silvia Pasquel as herself
- Silvia Pinal as herself
- Fabián Robles as Genovevo "Geno" Ramos
- Erik Rubín as Carlos León
- Mónika Sánchez as Diana
- María Sorté as herself
- Karla Talavera as Rosi
- Paty Thomas as Cecilia
- Gastón Tuset as Néstor Miranda
- Raúl Velasco as himself
- Silvia Derbez as Milagros

== Controversial ending ==
In the final episode, Maria Paula locks her two sisters in the basement of her mansion and holds them hostage. As their uncle Eduardo tries to rescue them, Maria Paula shoots and kills him. In an off-screen melee, as Gerardo and Nicolas come to check on them well-being, another gunshot is heard by the viewing audience and both Maria Guadalupe and Maria Fernanda emerge from the room relatively unscathed, while Maria Paula is rolled out in a body bag along with Eduardo. Maria Guadalupe and Nicolas then have a typical fairy tale novela wedding. In the final scene, Maria Guadalupe and Nicolas are in a hotel room on their honeymoon, but when the camera zooms into Maria Guadalupe's face, she rubs her eyebrow with her pinky finger, which was Maria Paula's trademark idiosyncratic habit. This left viewers to speculate whether it was actually Maria Guadalupe instead of Maria Paula who died by gunshot wound and Maria Paula had assumed her identity.

The show's ending since then had left fans to debate over the fate of the two. Questions came up such as the timing of Maria Paula being able to change clothes, jewelry, makeup, and hair appearance with Maria Guadalupe before supposedly shooting her until help arrived, as well as how Maria Guadalupe was able to get loose and grab the gun to shoot Maria Paula. Also there's the fact that all three of the sisters rub their left eyebrow at some point in the telenovela.

In 2019 Lucero gave her opinion on who was the one that had survived in the final episode, believing that it was Maria Guadalupe.

== Awards and nominations ==
Year	Award	Category	Nominee	Result
1996	14th TVyNovelas Awards	Best Telenovela	Carla Estrada	Won
1996	14th TVyNovelas Awards	Best Actress	Lucero	Won
1996	14th TVyNovelas Awards	Best Actor	Luis José Santander	Won
1996	14th TVyNovelas Awards	Best Leading Actress	Marga López	Won
1996	14th TVyNovelas Awards	Best Leading Actress	Silvia Derbez	Nominated
1996	14th TVyNovelas Awards	Best Leading Actor	Guillermo Murray	Nominated
1996	14th TVyNovelas Awards	Best Supporting Actress	Maty Huitrón	Nominated
1996	14th TVyNovelas Awards	Best Supporting Actor	Otto Sirgo	Won
1996	14th TVyNovelas Awards	Best Young Lead Actress	Karla Talavera	Nominated
1996	14th TVyNovelas Awards	Best Male Revelation	Juan Manuel Bernal	Nominated
1996	14th TVyNovelas Awards	Best Male Revelation	Orlando Miguel	Nominated
1996	14th TVyNovelas Awards	Best Direction	Miguel Córcega; Mónica Miguel	Won
1996	14th TVyNovelas Awards	Best Direction of the Cameras	Isabel Basurto; Alejandro Frutos	Won
1996	29th Diosa de Plata Awards	Best Telenovela	Carla Estrada	Won
1996	29th Diosa de Plata Awards	Best Actress	Lucero	Won
1996	31st El Heraldo de México Awards^{[A]}	Best Telenovela	Carla Estrada	Won
1996	31st El Heraldo de México Awards^{[A]}	Best Actress	Lucero	Won
1996	6th Eres Awards	Best Telenovela	Carla Estrada	Nominated
1996	6th Eres Awards	Best Actress	Lucero	Won
1996	6th Eres Awards	Best Actor	Luis José Santander	Nominated
1996	6th Eres Awards	Best Telenovela Musical Theme	"Lazos de amor" by Lucero	Nominated
1996	Aplauso Awards	Best Telenovela	Carla Estrada	Won
1996	Aplauso Awards	Best Actress	Lucero	Won
1997	Latin ACE Awards	Best Scenic Program	Lazos de amor	Won
1997	Latin ACE Awards	Best Actress	Lucero	Won
1997	Latin ACE Awards	Best Direction	Miguel Córcega; Mónica Miguel	Won

== Album ==
Lazos de amor

Soundtrack album by Lucero
- Released: 1995
- Recorded: 1989−1995
- Genre: Pop
- Label: Melody

Lucero chronology
Siempre Contigo (1994)	Lazos de amor (1995)	Piel de Ángel (1997)

Singles from Siempre Contigo
- 1. "Lazos de Amor"

Due to the telenovela's success, Televisa published a soundtrack, which included previously released songs by Lucero as well as three versions of the theme song of the series.

No.	Title	Writer(s)	Length
1.	"Lazos de amor"	José Cantoral	3:24
2.	"Lazos de amor (Instrumental Sax.)"	Rafael Pérez Botija	4:24
3.	"Volvamos a empezar"	Rafael Pérez Botija	3:46
4.	"Lazos de amor (Reggae)"	Rafael Pérez Botija	2:54
5.	"Déjame ir (Remix Radio)"	Rafael Pérez Botija	5:00
6.	"Como perro al sol"	Rafael Pérez Botija	3:36
7.	"Caso perdido"	J.R. Flores and C. Valle	3:28
8.	"Sobreviviré"	Rafael Pérez Botija	3:19
9.	"Los parientes pobres"	Rafael Pérez Botija	4:07
10.	"24 horas"	Rafael Pérez Botija	3:58
11.	"Siempre contigo"	Rafael Pérez Botija	4:11
