= Aracely Arámbula =

Mexican actress, model and singer

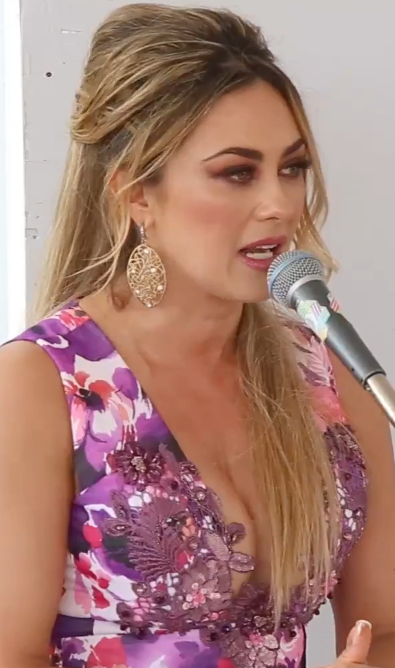
- Arámbula in May 2017
- Born: Aracely Arámbula Jáquez; March 6, 1975 (age 51); Chihuahua City, Mexico
- Other name: "La Chule"
- Occupations: Actress; model; singer; television personality; entrepreneur
- Years active: 1994–present
- Children: 2

Aracely Arámbula Jáquez (Spanish pronunciation: [aɾaˈseljaˈɾambula ˈʝaks]; born March 6, 1975), known professionally as Aracely Arámbula, is a Mexican actress, model, singer, television personality and entrepreneur.

== Life and career ==
=== Early life ===
Aracely Arambula Jáquez was born in Chihuahua City, Mexico, on March 6, 1975. At age 13, while attending high school, she began her road to fame, participating in beauty pageants. In 1996, Aracely won for "El rostro de El Heraldo de México", which launched her career.

=== Acting career ===
She began performing small roles in the telenovelas Prisionera de amor (1994), Acapulco, cuerpo y alma (1995) y Canción de Amor (1996). During her third year of studies at the Centro de Educación Artística of Televisa, Aracely received the opportunity to act in the telenovela Cañaveral de Pasiones.

In 1997 Aracely played the younger version of Veronica Castro's character in Pueblo Chico, Infierno Grande. Then she acted in telenovelas and Rencor apasionado, where she played her first antagonistic role. Aracely Arambula got her first starring role in the teen telenovela Soñadoras (1998) and then participated in Alma Rebelde (1999).

Her consecration as the protagonist came with Abrázame muy fuerte produced by Salvador Mejía, in 2000. Aracely continued its success with the latest telenovela of her first stint as television actress: Las vías del amor (2002), where she also sang the theme song. Besides music and television, Aracely entered the theater with productions such as Muchachos de Nueva York, Coqueluche, and Hermanos de Sangre.

In 2008, Aracely paused in her acting career, but she took her time fame as hostess of the program Todo Bebé. In 2009, Aracely Arambula returned to television sets to star in the umpteenth version of Corazón salvaje, where she had a double role. In 2010, Aracely Arambula debuted as the protagonist of the play Perfume de Gardênia which many considered the rival show of Aventurera.

In 2013, Aracely returned to telenovelas with La Patrona, produced by Telemundo and Argos, where she shares credits with Christian Bach and Jorge Luis Pila. In addition she sang two songs for the telenovela. Also, after the success obtained in La Patrona, Telemundo chose her as the lead in a melodrama based on the classic novel by Victor Hugo, Les Misérables, which was produced in 2014.

=== Music career ===
She began in music singing nursery rhymes as part of a tribute to Francisco Gabilondo Soler entitled Ellas Cantan Cri Cri. In 2001, Arambula was part of the Abrazame Muy Fuerte soundtrack.

In 2003, Aracely Arambula was nominated at the Billboard Latin Music Awards in the categories of Best Album, Best Duo and Best Regional Mexican Song with her production "Sólo Tuya" (2003); subsequently released the studio album Sexy, produced by Selena's brother, A. B. Quintanilla. Arámbula also writes songs and plays guitar.

Arambula has recorded two songs for La Patrona. These songs include "La patrona" (the theme song of the telenovela), and "Juntos tú y yo". Arambula is currently working on an upcoming studio album she plans to release in 2014. "We are working on the album and you will soon know the music, meanwhile, sounds in "La Patrona" two songs that I sing. Would be an unpublished and grupero, I like that style because I am north", said Arambula.

== Personal life ==
Arambula has also dabbled as an entrepreneur, lending her image for a perfume and cosmetics company in Mexico. Her brother, Dr. Leonardo Arámbula, has also served as her longtime manager. They own a spa in Mexico City together.

From 2005 to 2009, Arambula dated Luis Miguel. They have two sons Miguel (born January 1, 2007) and Daniel (born December 18, 2008).

== Filmography ==
Television roles
Year	Title	Roles	Notes
1994	Prisionera de amor	Unknown role	
1995	Acapulco, cuerpo y alma	Unknown role	
1996	Cañaveral de Pasiones	Leticia Cisneros	Special participation
1996	Canción de amor	Unknown role	
1996–1997	Mujer, Casos de la Vida Real	Unknown role	2 episodes
1997	Pueblo chico, infierno grande	Young Leonarda Ruán	Special participation
1997	El alma no tiene color	Maiguálida Roldán	Main cast
1998	Rencor apasionado	Mayteé Monteverde	Main role
1998-1999	Soñadoras	Jacqueline de la Peña	Main cast
1999	Alma rebelde	María Elena Hernández	Main cast
2000–2001	Abrázame muy fuerte	María del Carmen Hernández Álvarez de Rivero/ Maria Del Carmen Campuzano	Main cast
2002-2003	Las vías del amor	Perla Gutiérrez Vázquez	Main role
2009–2010	Corazón salvaje	Regina Montes de Oca / Aimée Montes de Oca	Main role
2013	La Patrona	Gabriela Suárez / Verónica Dantes "La Patrona"	Main role
2014–2015	Los miserables	Lucía "Lucha" Durán	Main role
2016–2020	La Doña	Altagracia Sandoval	Main role
2018	MasterChef Latino	Herself	Host (season 1)
2018	El Señor de los Cielos	Altagracia Sandoval	7 episodes
2022	La madrastra	Marcia Cisneros / Marisa Jones	Main role
2022	La rebelión	Mónica Bedolla	Main role
2025	Miss Universe Latina, el reality	Herself	Judge

Theater
Year	Title	Roles
2010–12, 2024-2025	Perfume de Gardênia	Gardenia Peralta
2014; 2022	Por qué los hombres aman a las cabronas	Dulce

== Dubbing ==
Year	Title	Character
2000	Saving Our Fragile Earth: Unico Special	Unico
2005	Onegai My Melody	Kuromi

== Discography ==
=== Albums ===
==== Studio albums ====
List of studio albums, with selected chart positions
Title	Album details	Peak chart positions	
Title	Album details	US Latin	MEX
Sólo tuya	Released: May 14, 2002; Formats: CD; Label: Disa Records	35	19
Sexy	Released: July 19, 2005; Formats: CD, Copy protected; Label: Capitol Records, EMI Latin	20	—
Linea de Oro	Released: July 10, 2007; Formats: CD; Label: Disa Records, UMGD	—	—
"—" denotes releases that did not chart or were not released in that territory.

==== Soundtrack albums ====
List of albums
Title	Album details
Abrazame Muy Fuerte	Released: May 15, 2001; Format: CD, digital download, cassette; Label: Sony BMG

=== Singles ===
==== As lead artist ====
List of singles, with selected chart positions and certifications
Title	Year	Peak chart positions		Album
Title	Year	US Latin	MEX	Album
"Te Quiero Mas Que Ayer" (feat. Palomo)	2002	27	9	Sólo tuya
"Ojalá"	2002	—	—	Sólo tuya
"Sexy"	2005	23	—	Sexy
"Bruja"	2005	—	—	Sexy
"Maldita Soledad"	2005	—	—	Sexy
"—" denotes releases that did not chart or were not released in that territory.

==== As featured artist ====
Title	Year	Album
"Arriba" (DJ Kane feat. Aracely Arámbula)	2005	Capítulo II: Brinca

==== Promotional singles ====
Title	Year	Album
"Las vías del amor"	2002	Linea de Oro
"La patrona"	2013	non-album song

=== Other appearances ===
Title	Year	Other artist(s)	Album
"La Maquinita"	1999	—N/a	Ellas Cantan a Cri Cri
"Niña y mujer"	2001	—N/a	Abrázame muy fuerte
"Miedo"	2001	—N/a	Abrázame muy fuerte
"Bla, bla, bla"	2001	—N/a	Abrázame muy fuerte
"Salva a tu México"	2011	María Victoria	¡Víva la Reina de México!
"Juntos tú y yo"	2013	—N/a	non-album song

=== Music videos ===
Title	Year	Notes
"Te quiero mas que ayer"	2002	
"Las vías del amor"	2002	Promotional video of the telenovela of the same name
"Sexy"	2005	

== Awards and nominations ==
Year	Award	Category	Nominated work	Result
1996	El Heraldo de México Awards	El rostro de El Heraldo de México (The face of El Heraldo de Mexico)	Herself	Won
1999	TVyNovelas Awards	Mejor Actriz Revelación (Best Female Revelation)	Soñadoras	Nominated
2001	TVyNovelas Awards	Mejor Beso (Best Liplock) (with Fernando Colunga)	Abrázame muy fuerte	Nominated
2001	TVyNovelas Awards	Mejor Actriz Protagónica (Best Lead Actress)	Abrázame muy fuerte	Nominated
2001	El Heraldo de México Awards	Mejor Actriz (Best Actress)	Abrázame muy fuerte	Won
2003	TVyNovelas Awards	Mejor Actriz Protagónica (Best Lead Actress)	Las vías del amor	Nominated
2003	Billboard Latin Music Awards	Mejor Disco (Best Album)	Sólo tuya	Nominated
2003	Billboard Latin Music Awards	Mejor Dúo (Best Duet) (with Palomo)	Sólo tuya	Nominated
2003	Billboard Latin Music Awards	Mejor Tema Regional Mexicano (Best Regional Mexican Song)	Sólo tuya	Nominated
2004	Premios Juventud	Chica Que Me Quita El Sueño (Dream Chic)	Herself	Nominated
2010	TVyNovelas Awards	Mejor Actriz Antagónica (Best Female Antagonist)	Corazón salvaje	Nominated
2010	TVyNovelas Awards	Mejor Actriz Protagónica (Best Lead Actress)	Corazón salvaje	Nominated
2013	Premios Tu Mundo	Protagonista Favorita (Favorite Lead Role)	La Patrona	Won
2013	Premios Tu Mundo	La Pareja Perfecta (The Perfect Couple) (with Jorge Luis Pila)	La Patrona	Won
2013	Premios People en Español	Mejor Actriz (Best Actress)	La Patrona	Nominated
2013	Premios People en Español	Pareja de año (Couple of the year) (with Jorge Luis Pila)	La Patrona	Nominated
2017	Premios Tu Mundo	Protagonista Favorita (Favorite Lead Role)	La Doña	Won
2017	Premios Tu Mundo	La Pareja Perfecta (The Perfect Couple) (with David Chocarro)	La Doña	Won

== Notes ==
- A: Top Latin Albums.
- B: Latin Songs.
