= María Sorté =

Mexican actress and singer

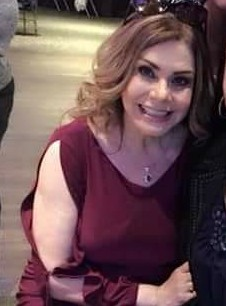
- Born: María Harfuch Hidalgo; May 11, 1955 (age 70); Camargo, Chihuahua, Mexico
- Occupations: Actress, singer
- Years active: 1974-present
- Spouse: Javier García Paniagua (m. 1978; died 1998)
- Children: Omar & Adrian García Harfuch
- Parent(s): José Harfuch Stefano; Celia Hidalgo
- Relatives: Six grandchildren

María Sorté (born María Harfuch Hidalgo on May 11, 1955) is a Mexican actress and singer.

== Biography ==
Sorté was born May 11, 1955, in Camargo, Chihuahua, Mexico. Her parents were José Harfuch Stefano and Celia Hidalgo. Her father's surname, "Harfuch", reflects his Lebanese ancestry. She came to Mexico City to study medicine. With her husband, Javier García Paniagua (a politician), she has two sons – Omar and Adrian. Javier died of a heart attack in 1998. Omar García Harfuch served as the Chief of Police in Mexico City from 2018 to 2023. She has six grandchildren.

== Filmography ==
=== Film ===
List of appearances and roles in feature films
Year	Title	Role	Notes
1976	Zona Roja	La Pancha	
1978	Los Triunfadores	Fernando's girlfriend	
1978	No tiene la culpa el Indio	Viuda	
1978	El fuego de mi ahijada	Alicia	
1979	Mexicano hasta las cachas	Mauro's Wife	
1981	El testamento	Martha	
1982	El barrendero	Chipinita	
1983	Con el cuerpo prestado	Carlota Beltrán	
1985	El embustero		
1985	El hombre de la mandolina	Rocio	
1986	Como si fuéramos novios	Mamá	
1986	El hijo del viento	Ana Luisa	
1990	La jaula de la muerte		
1993	Un ángel para los diablillos	Aurora; Isabel Martinez	
1996	En las manos de Dios		Writer/producer
2000	Religión, la fuerza de la costumbre	Rosy	
2000	Milenio, el principio del fin	Tere	
2000	Drogadicto	Rita	
2005	La hacienda del terror	Notary	
2006	Bienvenido Paisano	Cenobia	
2011	La estampa del escorpión 2	Doña María	
2013	Siete años de matrimonio	Edna	

=== Television ===
List of appearances in television series and specials
Year	Title	Role	Notes
1974	Mundo de juguete	Guillermina	Television debut
1979	Amor prohibido		
1980	Colorina	Mirna	
1982	Por amor	Belén	
1983	El maleficio	Patricia	
1985	Abandonada	María	
1989	Mi segunda madre	Daniela Lorente	
1991-04	Mujer, casos de la vida real	Various roles	"No quiero que sufran" (Season 7, Episode 2); "El regalo" (Season 13, Episode 5); "Nunca es tarde para el perdón" (Season 13, Episode 37); "El dolor de la belleza" (Season 18, Episode 59); "Días grises" (Season 21, Episode 2)
1992	De frente al sol	Alicia Sandoval	
1993–94	Más allá del puente	Alicia Sandoval	
1995	Lazos de amor	Herself	
1997	El secreto de Alejandra	María / Alejandra	
1998–99	El privilegio de amar	Vivian del Ángel	
1999	Cuento de Navidad	María	TV mini-series
2000	DKDA: Sueños de juventud	Rita Martínez	
2000	Mi destino eres tú	Amparo Calderón de Rodríguez	
2001	Mujer bonita	Sol	
2001	Sin pecado concebido	Amparo Ibáñez	
2002	Entre el amor y el odio	María Magdalena Moreno	
2003	Amor real	Rosaura	
2004	Mujer de madera	Celia de Gómez	
2005	Don Francisco Presenta	Herself	Archive footage
2006	La verdad oculta	Yolanda Rey	20 episodes
2006	Amar sin límites	Clemencia Huerta de Morán	
2008	Fuego en la sangre	Eva Rodríguez	
2009	Mujeres asesinas	María González	"María, pescadera" (Season 2, Episode 11)
2009–10	Mar de amor	Aurora de Ruiz	9 episodes
2012	Amor bravío	Amanda	135 episodes
2013	La Tempestad	Beatriz de Reverte	
2015	Que te perdone Dios	Helena Fuentes	93 episodes
2016	Corazón que miente	Carmen Oceguera	
2019- 20	Soltero con hijas	Úrsula Pérez	
2021	Diseñando tu amor	Consuelo Morales	
2023	Vencer la culpa	Amanda	
2024–25	Las hijas de la señora García	Ofelia García	Lead role
