= Lilia Aragón =

Mexican actress and politician (1938–2021)

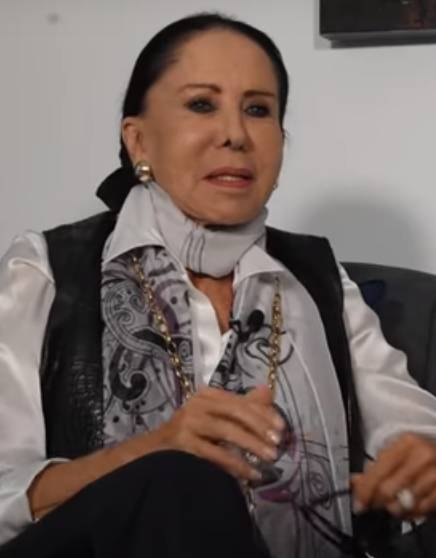
- Born: Lilia Isabel Aragón del Rivero; 22 September 1938; Cuautla, Morelos, Mexico
- Died: 2 August 2021 (aged 82); Cuernavaca, Morelos, Mexico
- Occupations: Actress and politician
- Years active: 1970–2021
- Political party: PRI
- Spouses: Enrique Soto (divorced) Guillermo Mendizábal (divorced)
- Children: 4
- Relatives: Yolanda Ventura (former daughter-in-law)

Lilia Isabel Aragón del Rivero (born 22 September 1938 – 2 August 2021) was a Mexican film, television, and stage actress and politician. She was the Secretary of the National Association of Actors.

She also served as Deputy of the LIX Legislature of the Mexican Congress representing the Federal District as replacement of Elba Esther Gordillo.

== Selected filmography ==
=== Telenovelas ===
Year	Title	Character	Note
2016	Mujeres de negro	Catalina Suárez Vda. de Lombardo	Antagonist
2016	Simplemente María	Constanza Viarnau Vda. de Montesinos	Special Appearance
2015	Hasta el fin del mundo	Yuba	Special Appearance
2012	Amores verdaderos	Odette Ruiz Vda. de Longoria	Antagonist
2011	Esperanza del corazón	"La Tocha"	Special Appearance
2005	La esposa virgen	Aurelia Betancourt Vda. de Ortiz	Main Antagonist
2004	Rubí	Nora de Navarro	Special Appearance
2003	Velo de novia	Enriqueta Valverde Vda. de Del Moral	Antagonist
2000	Abrázame muy fuerte	Efigenia de la Cruz y Fereira	Supporting Role
1997	Pueblo chico, infierno grande	La Tapanca	Supporting Role
1996	La sombra del otro	Marina Morales	Supporting Role
1993-94	Más allá del puente	Ofelia Villalba Vda. de Fuentes	Main Antagonist
1992	De frente al sol	Ofelia Villalba Vda. de Fuentes	Main Antagonist
1990	Cuando llega el amor	Helena Ríos / Hellen Rivers	Supporting Role
1986	Cuna de lobos	Rosalía Mendoza	Antagonist

=== Series ===
- Como dice el dicho (2012–2016) as Various characters

=== Film ===
- The Garden of Aunt Isabel (1971)
