= De frente al sol =

Mexican telenovela

- Genre: Telenovela
- Created by: René Muñoz
- Directed by: Mónica Miguel
- Starring: María Sorté; Alfredo Adame; Angélica Aragón; Arcelia Ramírez; Eduardo Santamarina
- Opening theme: "De frente al sol" by María Sorté
- Country of origin: Mexico
- Original language: Spanish
- No. of episodes: 95

Production
- Executive producer: Carla Estrada

Original release
- Network: Canal de las Estrellas
- Release: May 4 – September 11, 1992

Related
- Más allá del puente

De frente al sol is a Mexican telenovela produced by Carla Estrada for Televisa in 1992.

María Sorté, Alfredo Adame, Angélica Aragón, Arcelia Ramírez and Eduardo Santamarina star as the main protagonists.

== Cast ==
- María Sorté as Alicia
- Alfredo Adame as Eduardo
- Angélica Aragón as Chole
- Arcelia Ramírez as Carolina
- Eduardo Santamarina as Luis Enrique
- Sergio Kleiner as Adrián
- Lilia Aragón as Ofelia
- Ada Carrasco as Lich
- Miguel Córcega as Hernán
- Lupita Lara as Úrsula
- Mónica Miguel as Amaranta
- José Elías Moreno as Morán Mariño
- René Muñoz as Quijano
- Maritza Olivares as Elena
- Anna Silvetti as Noemí
- Itatí Cantoral as Lupita
- Romina Castro as Tina
- Leonardo Daniel as Young Adrián
- Eugenio Derbez as Crispín
- Alejandra Maldonado as Sara
- Mónica Prado as Estela
- Ricardo de Loera as Zamudio
- Tomás Goros as Eulogio
- Manuel Guízar as Guzmán
- Gloria Jordán as Mica
- Carlos Girón as Carlos
- Ariel López Padilla as Juan Carlos
- Sara Luz as Adela
- Eduardo Rivera as Jacinto
- Eric del Castillo as Daniel

== Sequel ==
In 1993 Televisa made a sequel to this telenovela entitled Más allá del puente starring María Sorté, Alfredo Adame, Angélica Aragón, Omar Fierro, Arcelia Ramírez and Eduardo Santamarina.
