= Carla Estrada =

Mexican television producer

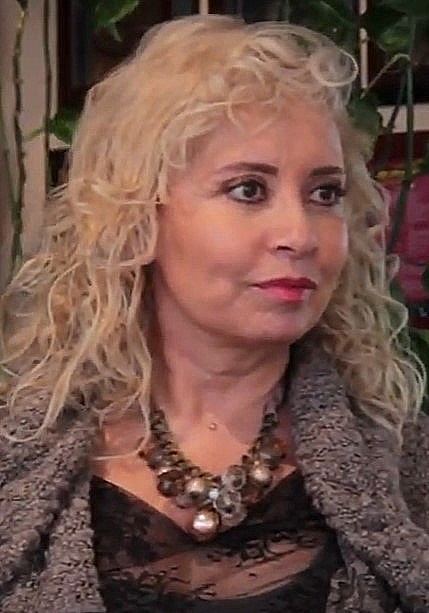
- Born: Carla Patricia Estrada Guitrón; March 11, 1956 (age 70); Mexico City, D.F., Mexico
- Occupation: Executive producer
- Years active: 1986–present
- Children: Carlos López Estrada

Carla Patricia Estrada Guitrón (born March 11, 1956) is a Mexican television producer, one of the foremost telenovela producers of Latin America.

== Biography ==
In 2005, the Mexican government decided to place a statue of the producer in one of Mexico City's most important parks and in January 2007 she appeared on People En Español's list of The 100 Most Influential Hispanics in the world. When aired in the United States, Estrada's telenovela Amor Real shocked the world by having higher ratings than all of the other television shows in America; placing Univision on top of American networks such as NBC and ABC.

Estrada went to the UAM in Xochimilco to study psychology. She decided not to follow that career soon after, however, and she asked to have her major changed. Given a choice of new classes she could take, she chose communications, in part because her father was a journalist and her mother an actress.

Before graduating from the UAM in 1978, Estrada had already been hired by Televisa. She made history at Televisa by becoming the first woman producer in Mexican television history, but her beginnings were humble: at first, no celebrity wanted to work with her. Over the years this has changed, however, and she has produced some of Mexico's (and Latin America's) most famous soap operas, while working with such famous actors as Adamari López, Adela Noriega, Lucero, Fernando Colunga, Gabriela Roel and many more. Estrada was asked to produce soap operas for Televisa by Victor Hugo O'Farril. Her first soap opera was Pobre Juventud. Before that, she had been the producer of the teen-oriented show, Xe-Tu, where many superstars, such as Gloria Trevi, participated.

Estrada has spoken about the abuse she had to go through during the production of Pobre Juventud, both on the mental and physical aspect. According to her, she was subjected to mistreatment by her own employees, who went as far as hitting her on her legs with a cable once, because they were not used to having a woman boss.

She has often spoken about the importance of transmitting positive messages through her shows and her fascination towards love stories.

Carla Estrada is considered by many, including personal friend Cristina Saralegui, to be the greatest soap opera producer in Mexico, and her soap operas generally have wide international acceptance. One of her projects, Amor Real, was once watched by 59 percent of the Mexican audience.

== Filmography ==
Executive producer, Comedy Series, Music Show, Contest, TV Show
Year	Title	Notes
1982-87	XE-TU	Executive producer
1986-87	Pobre juventud	Executive producer
1987	Pobre señorita Limantour	Executive producer
1987-88	Quinceañera	Executive producer
1988	Amor en silencio	Executive producer
1989-1990	Cuando llega el amor	Executive producer
1990-91	Amor de nadie	Executive producer
1992	De frente al sol	Executive producer
1993	Los Parientes Pobres	Executive producer
1993-94	Más allá del puente	Executive producer
1995	Alondra	Executive producer
1995-96	Lazos de Amor	Executive producer
1996-97	Te sigo amando	Executive producer
1997-98	María Isabel	Executive producer
1997-00	Picardía mexicana	Contest
1998-99	El Privilegio de Amar	Executive producer
2000	Mi Destino Eres Tú	Executive producer
2000-07	La hora pico	Comedy Series
2001-02	El Manantial	Executive producer
2002-07	La parodia	Comedy Series
2003	Amor real	Executive producer
2005-06	Alborada	Executive producer
2005-06	El Privilegio de Mandar	Comedy Series
2007-08	Pasión	Executive producer
2009	Sortilegio	Executive producer
2011	La vida es mejor cantando	Music Show
2012-13	Los doctores	TV show
2013-2016	Hoy	TV show
2016	Por siempre Joan Sebastian	Executive producer
2019	This Is Silvia Pinal	Executive producer

== Awards and nominations ==
=== Premios TVyNovelas ===
As Executive Producer
Year	Category	Telenovela	Result
1988	Best Telenovela of the Year	Quinceañera	Won
1989	Best Telenovela of the Year	Amor en Silencio	Won
1990	Best Telenovela of the Year	Cuando llega el amor	Nominated
1993	Best Telenovela of the Year	De frente al sol	Won
1994	Best Telenovela of the Year	Los Parientes Pobres	Nominated
1996	Best Telenovela of the Year	Lazos de Amor	Won
1998	Best Telenovela of the Year	María Isabel	Nominated
1999	Best Telenovela of the Year	El Privilegio de Amar	Won
2002	Best Telenovela of the Year	El Manantial	Won
2004	Best Telenovela of the Year	Amor Real	Won
2006	Best Telenovela of the Year	Alborada	Won
2008	Best Telenovela of the Year	Pasión	Nominated
2010	Best Telenovela of the Year	Sortilegio	Nominated

As Producer of TV Programs
Year	Category	Telenovela	Result
2003	Best Comedy Program	La Parodia	Won
2004	Best Comedy Program	La hora pico	Nominated
2004	Best Variety Program	La Parodia	Won
2006	Best Program Variety or Musical	La Parodia	Won
2006	Best Comedy Program or Series	La hora pico	Nominated
2006	Best Comedy Program or Series	El Privilegio de Mandar	Won
2007	Best Comedy Program	El Privilegio de Mandar	Nominated
2007	Best Comedy Program	La hora pico	Nominated
2007	Best Variety Program	La Parodia	Won
2012	Best Musical Talent Program	La vida es mejor cantando	Nominated
2013	Best Variety Program	Los Doctores	Nominated
2014	Best Variety Program	Hoy	Won
