= René Muñoz =

Cuban actor and screenwriter

- Born: February 19, 1938; Havana, Cuba
- Died: May 11, 2000 (aged 62); Mexico City, Mexico
- Years active: 1961-2000

René Muñoz (February 19, 1938 – May 11, 2000) was a Cuban actor and screenwriter of telenovelas and the cinema of Mexico.

He is most remembered for his role in the Spanish film Fray Escoba.

== Biography ==
He was born in Havana, Cuba but started his acting career in Spain with the film Fray Escoba of Ramón Torrado. He made two more films with him and then moved to Mexico to participate in Los hijos que yo soñé ("The sons I dreamed of") and the telenovela San Martín de Porres that made him famous in this country. He made his last film in the Mexico/United States production The Bees and focused on working on telenovelas. In 1987 he wrote his first scripts for telenovelas for Como duele callar and the first story written for a young audience Quinceañera. Quinceañera was the telenovela of the year, it featured singer Thalía in one of the main roles and catapulted the career of Adela Noriega in her first starring role. In 1992 he wrote the script for De frente al sol, a telenovela starred by Angélica Aragón in the role of an indigenous woman and its sequel Más allá del puente. In 1986 he adapted the script for Monte Calvario and in 1997 for its remake Te sigo amando. He took the role of Padre Murillo in both productions. He also was an actor, and performed in La Usurpadora as Mojarras.

He died of cancer in May 2000 in Mexico City, in full recording of the soap opera Abrázame muy fuerte.

== Films ==
- The Bees (1978) as a delegate
- Cuna de valientes (1972)
- El pocho (1970) as a delegate
- Un mulato llamado Martín (1970) as Fray Martín de Porres
- Los hijos que yo soñé (1965)
- Bienvenido, padre Murray (1964)
- Cristo negro (1963)
- Fray Escoba (1961) as Fray Martín de Porres

== Telenovelas ==
- Abrázame muy fuerte (2000-2001) as Regino
- Rosalinda (1999) as Abuelo Florentino Rosas
- La Usurpadora (1998) as Luis Felipe Benítez a.k.a. "El Mojarras"
- Te sigo amando (1996-1997) as Padre Murillo
- María la del Barrio (1995-1996) as El Veracruz
- Marimar (1994) as Padre Porres
- Más allá del puente (1993-1994) as Quijano
- De frente al sol (1992) as Quijano
- Carrusel de las Américas (1992) as Alvaro
- Mi pequeña Soledad (1990) as Gaetano
- Cuando llega el amor (1989-1990) as Chucho
- Quinceañera (1987-1988) as Tino
- Rosa salvaje (1987-1988) as Doctor
- Monte Calvario (1986) as Padre
- Pobre juventud (1986-1987) as Anselmo
- Vivir un poco (1985-1986) Telenovela
- El cielo es para todos (1979) as San Martín de Porres
- Corazón salvaje (1977-1978) as Esteban
- La venganza (1977) as Mohamed
- Los que ayudan a Dios (1973-1974) as Dr. César Grajales
- San Martín de Porres (1964-1965) as San Martín de Porres

== Scripts ==
=== Adaptation ===
- Que te perdone Dios (2015)
- Abrázame muy fuerte (2000)
- Primer amor... a mil por hora (2000)
- María Isabel, si tu supieras (1997)
- Te sigo amando (1997)
- Mi querida Isabel (1996)
- Mi pequeña Soledad (1990)

=== Original story ===
- Primer amor, a mil por hora (2000)
- Más allá del puente (1994)
- De frente al sol (1992)
- Quinceañera (1987)
- Cómo duele callar (1987)
