= Eduardo Santamarina =

Mexican actor

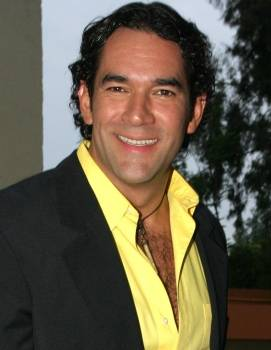
- Santamarina in 2011
- Born: Eduardo Hernández García Santamarina; 9 July 1969 (age 57); Veracruz, Veracruz, Mexico
- Occupation: Actor
- Spouses: Itatí Cantoral (m. 1999; div. 2004) Mayrín Villanueva (m. 2009)
- Children: 3
- Website: eduardosantamarina.net

Eduardo Hernández García Santamarina (Spanish pronunciation: [eˈðwaɾðo santamaˈɾina]; born 9 July 1969) is a Mexican film, theater, and television actor who is known for his leading roles in many telenovelas. Beside Televisa telenovelas, Santamarina appeared in some Telemundo telenovelas. He is married to Mexican telenovela actress Mayrín Villanueva.

== Acting career ==
Santamarina took acting classes at the Centro de Educación Artística (CEA) in Mexico City from 1989 to 1991. He made his acting debut in 1992 on the set of the telenovela De frente al sol, produced by Carla Estrada. His more notable roles to date were in the telenovelas Marisol in 1996 and Rubí in 2004. He made his feature film debuts in the Mexican films Baño de Mujeres and Ya No Los Hacen Como Antes, both released in 2002. He starred as the antagonist in Emilio Larrosa's telenovela: Libre para amarte.

== Personal life ==
Eduardo married actress Itatí Cantoral in 2000. She gave birth to the couple's twin boys José Eduardo and Roberto Miguel in August 2000. Both Santamarina and Cantoral filed for divorce in 2003 and the marriage was formally dissolved in 2004. While still married to Cantoral, he began an on-and-off relationship with actress Susana González until their well-publicized separation in November 2007.

Currently, he is married to his Yo amo a Juan Querendón co-star, actress Mayrín Villanueva. She gave birth to their daughter Julia on 18 July 2009, via Caesarean section.

== Filmography ==
| Year | Title |
|---|---|
| 2003 | Ladies Room |
| 2002 | Ya No Los Hacen Como Antes |
| 2004 | La Sombra del Sahuaro |
| 2005 | Seguridad Nacional |

== Telenovelas ==
| Year | Title | Role | Notes |
|---|---|---|---|
| 1992 | De frente al sol | Luis Enrique | Main cast |
| 1993–1994 | Más Allá del Puente | Luis Enrique | Main cast |
| 1994 | Prisionera de Amor | Rodrigo Miranda | Recurring role |
| 1994–1995 | El Vuelo del Águila | Dr. Ortega | Guest star |
| 1995 | La Dueña | Mauricio Padilla | Recurring role |
| 1996 | Marisol | José Andrés Garcés del Valle | Lead role |
| 1996 | La antorcha encendida | Félix | Guest star |
| 1997–1998 | Salud, Dinero y Amor | Jorge Miguel Fontanot | Lead role |
| 1998 | Rencor apasionado | Mauricio Gallardo Del Campo | Lead role |
| 1999 | Serafin | Miguel Armendariz | Lead role |
| 1999–2000 | Cuento de navidad | Angel | |
| 2000–2001 | El Precio de tu Amor | Antonio Ríos | Lead role |
| 2001 | Amigas y rivales | José Alcántara | Lead role |
| 2003–2004 | Velo de novia | José Manuel del Alamo/Jorge Robleto | Lead role |
| 2004 | Rubí | Alejandro Cárdenas Ruíz | Lead role |
| 2007–2008 | Yo amo a Juan Querendón | Juan Dominguez | Lead role |
| 2010 | Triunfo del amor | Don Octavio Iturbide | Guest star |
| 2011 | Ni contigo ni sin ti | Leonardo Cornejo Fernández | Lead role |
| 2012 | Por ella soy Eva | Diego Fonticoda | Recurring role |
| 2013 | Libre para amarte | Ramón Sotomayor | Lead role |
| 2015–2016 | Antes muerta que Lichita | Augusto de Toledo y Mondragón | Main cast |
| 2017–2018 | Sin tu mirada | Luis Ocaranza | Main cast |
| 2018–2020 | El Señor de los Cielos | Balthazar Ojeda | Main cast |
| 2018 | El secreto de Selena | Dr. Ricardo Martinez | Main cast |
| 2019 | La Reina del Sur | Mariano Bravo | Recurring role (season 2) |
| 2021 | Buscando a Frida | Abelardo Pons | Lead role |
| 2021 | La desalmada | Octavio Toscano | Main cast |
| 2023 | Nadie como tú | Raimundo Madrigal Canales | Main cast |
| 2025 | Juegos de amor y poder | Enrique Ferrer | Main cast |
| 2025 | Los hilos del pasado | Manuel Navarro | Main cast |
| 2026 | Sabor a ti | Maximiliano "Max" Sarmiento | Main Cast |
