= Mónica Miguel =

Mexican actress (1936–2020)

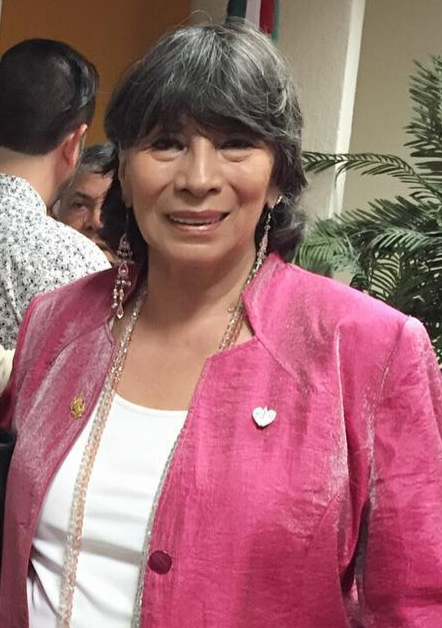
- Miguel in 2020
- Born: Gloria Chávez Miguel; 13 March 1936; Tepic, Nayarit, Mexico
- Died: 12 August 2020 (aged 84); Mexico City, Mexico
- Height: 1.60 m (5 ft 3 in)

Mónica Miguel (born Gloria Chávez Miguel; 13 March 1936 – 12 August 2020) was a Mexican actress, director, and singer.

== Career ==
Passionate about the arts and especially the theater, she would attend the occasional stage plays that came to Tepic. She joined a performance troupe that was supported by the local administration, but that support came to an end when the administration changed hands.

In pursuit of her artistic dreams on the stage, she traveled to Mexico City. She studied theater at the academy of the Asociación Nacional de Actores. Encouraged by colleagues, she traveled to Japan and then Italy, where she worked in film, theater, and television. There she recorded her first album. Her eight-year stay in Rome gave her maturity as a human being and as an artist. She gave recitals in Greece, Cyprus, and England.

After her return to Mexico, for her performances at the Insurgentes theater, in the works Vine, ví y mejor me fuí and La maestra bebe un poco, she received an award from the Unión de cronistas de Teatro (Union of Theater Critics). In 1981 she performed in "The Merry Wives of Windsor" together with Alfredo Sevilla, and Tara Parra Chela Nájera among others. In 1981, the Mexican Association of Theater Critics named her best actress and singer for her performance in Man of La Mancha.

In 1986, she received the María Tereza Montoya and Virginia Fábregas prizes for her acting in Aire frío.

Since 1988, she has directed many popular, internationally distributed soap operas. This work has earned her prizes from the Herald and New York Latin ACE Award. A promoter of the arts of her homeland, she promoted and supported the artistic and cultural values of her fellow countrymen, and was a member of ANDA (National Actors Association of Mexico).

== Death ==
Monica Miguel's death was announced by the Mexican Asociación Nacional de Intérpretes on 12 August 2020. The Organización Nayarita para Desarrollar el Arte (ONDA Nayarit) tweeted, "Con profunda pena notificamos el fallecimiento de la actriz, interprete y directora de escena Mónica Miguel. Descanse en paz. Nuestras más sentidas condolencias y solidaridad para su familia". ("It is with deep sadness that we notify the death of the actress, interpreter and stage director Mónica Miguel. Rest in peace. Our deepest condolences and solidarity for her family.")

== Filmography ==
=== As actress ===
Radionovelas

- Rayo de plata (Doce Balas contra el Mal)
- Kalimán – Profanadores de Tumbas ... Nila Tagore
- Kalimán – Las Momias de Machu-Pichu ... Pekembá
- Kalimán – La Reina de los Gorilas ... Sandra
- Kalimán – Los Samurais Mensajeros de la Muerte ... Diana Morris
- Kalimán – Más Allá del Más Allá ... The Queen of night

Film

- El tigre de Guanajuato (1965)
- El planeta de las mujeres invasoras (1967) – Fitia
- Night of the Serpent (1969) – Ignacio's wife
- Pistol for a Hundred Coffins (1971) – Jenny
- Bring Me the Head of Alfredo Garcia (1974) – Dolores de Escomiglia
- Víbora caliente (1976) – Ramona
- Oficio de tinieblas (1981) – Catalina Díaz Puíljo
- Under Fire (1983) – Doctora
- Gertrudis Bocanegra (1992) – Nana
- Más allá del muro (2009)
- Sueño en otro idioma (2017) – Jacinta

Telenovelas and series

- Entre brumas (1973)
- La casa de Bernarda Alba (1974, TV Movie) – Magdalena
- Orfeo 9 (1975, TV Movie) – Chiromante
- Winnetou el mescalero (1980, TV Movie) – Nalin Vincent
- Por amor (1982) – Ramona
- Amalia Batista (1983) – Matilde
- Abandonada (1985) – Lucía
- El engaño (1986) – Carmen
- Cómo duele callar (1987) – Casimira
- Yesenia (1987) – Trifenia
- Flor y canela (1988) – Ana
- Morir para vivir (1989)
- Cuando llega el amor (1990) – Yulma
- Amor de nadie (1990) – Socorro
- De frente al sol (1992) – Amaranta
- Más allá del puente (1993) – Amaranta
- Lazos de amor (1995) – Chole
- María Isabel (1997) – Chona
- Mujer, casos de la vida real (1999-2006)
- La casa en la playa (2000) – María Estrada
- Alborada (2005-2006) – Modesta
- Sexo y otros secretos (2008) – Mónica
- Sortilegio (2009) – Maya San Juan
- La fuerza del destino (2011) – Sanadora Seri
- La Tempestad (2013) – Madre Eusebia
- M.D.: Life on the Line (2019) – Doña Inés (fina appearance)

=== As director ===
- Director of dialog for Quinceñera (1987)
- Second part of Amor en silencio (1988)
- Flor y canela (1988-1989)
- Cuando llega el amor (1990)
- Amor de nadie (1990-1991)
- De frente al sol (1992)
- First part of Entre la vida y la muerte (1993)
- Los parientes pobres (1993)
- Más allá del puente (1993-1994)
- Alondra (1995)
- Lazos de amor (1995-1996)
- Te sigo amando (1996-1997)
- María Isabel (1997-1998)
- El privilegio de amar (1998-1999)
- La casa en la playa (2000)
- Mi destino eres tú (2000)
- El Manantial (2001-2002)
- Amor real (2003)
- Alborada (2005-2006)
- Pasión (2007-2008)
- Sortilegio (2009)
- Teresa (2010-2011)
- La Tempestad (2013)
- Lo imperdonable (2015)
- Silvia, frente a ti (2019)
