= Miguel Córcega =

Mexican actor (1929–2008)

Miguel Córcega (Spanish pronunciation: [miˈɣel ˈkoɾseɣa], October 29, 1929 in Mexico City – September 29, 2008 in Mexico City) was a Mexican telenovela actor and director. Córcega started his career in acting and directing during the 1940s.

== Biography ==
=== Film ===
In the 1960s, Córcega participated in the Viruta y Capulina films El dolor de pagar la renta and Dos pintores pintorescos. In the latter film, he co-starred as the villain, Lorenzo, a fortune hunter who murders a woman and tries to murder Capulina, whom he thinks is a witness of the crime.

=== Telenovelas ===
Córcega directed such Mexican telenovelas and soap operas as Lazos de Amor and El privilegio de amar. His acting credits included the television series Cadenas de amargura.

Later in life, Córcega appeared in Cuidado con el ángel in the role of Padre Anselmo. However, he was forced to retire from the popular television show due to illness. Corcega's role of Padre Anselmo in the show passed to actor Héctor Gómez.

=== Death ===
Miguel Córcega died of a stroke in Mexico City on September 29, 2008, at the age of 78.

His funeral was held at the Garden of Mexico pantheon in Mexico City.

== Selected filmography ==
- The Two Orphans (1950)
- The Medallion Crime (1956)
- Every Child a Cross to Bear (1957)
