= 18th TVyNovelas Awards =

2000 Mexican TV awards

- Date: May 30, 2000
- Location: Mexico D.F.
- Hosted by: Marco Antonio Regil & Adela Micha

Highlights
- Most awards: Laberintos de pasión (7)
- Most nominations: Laberintos de pasión (12)

Television/radio coverage
- Network: Canal de las Estrellas

The 18th TVyNovelas Awards were an academy of special awards to the best soap operas and TV shows. The awards ceremony took place on May 30, 2000 in Mexico D.F. The ceremony was televised in Mexico by Canal de las Estrellas.

Marco Antonio Regil and Adela Micha hosted the show. Laberintos de pasión won 7 awards, the most for the evening, including Best Telenovela. Other winners Mujeres engañadas won 5 awards, Tres mujeres won 3 awards, Amor gitano won 2 awards and DKDA: Sueños de juventud, Infierno en el paraíso, La vida en el espejo and Serafín won 1 each.

== Summary of awards and nominations ==
Telenovela	Nominations	Awards
Laberintos de pasión	12	7
Tres mujeres	10	3
Mujeres engañadas	8	5
La vida en el espejo	3	1
Rosalinda	3	0
Amor gitano	2	2
Nunca te olvidaré	2	0
Por tu amor	2	0
DKDA: Sueños de juventud	1	1
Infierno en el paraíso	1	1
Serafín	1	1

== Winners and nominees ==
=== Telenovelas ===
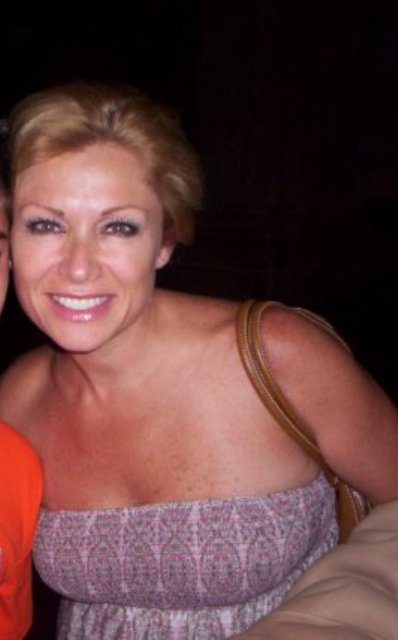
Leticia Calderón, winner for Best Actress.

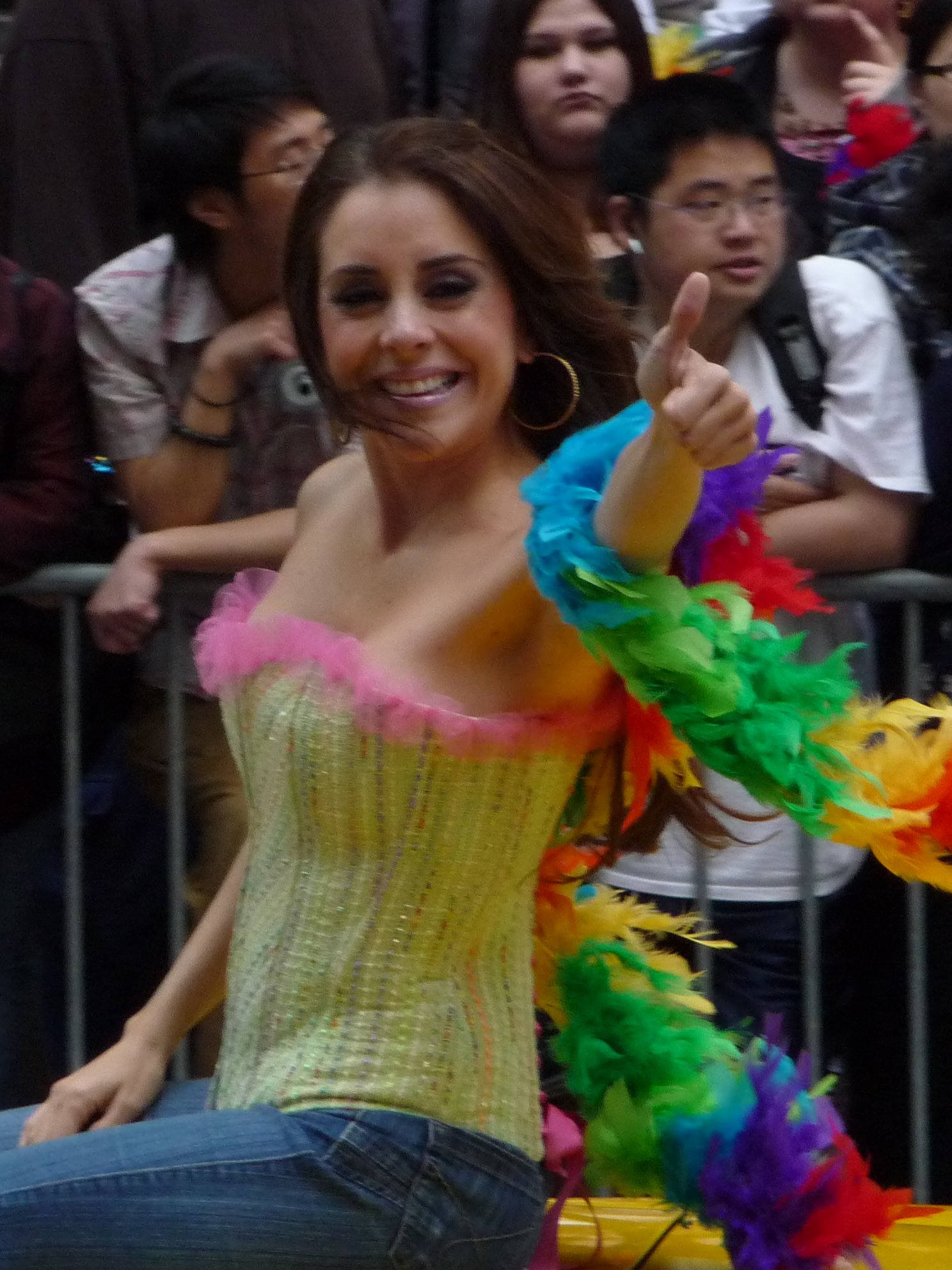
Karyme Lozano, winner for Best Young Lead Actress.

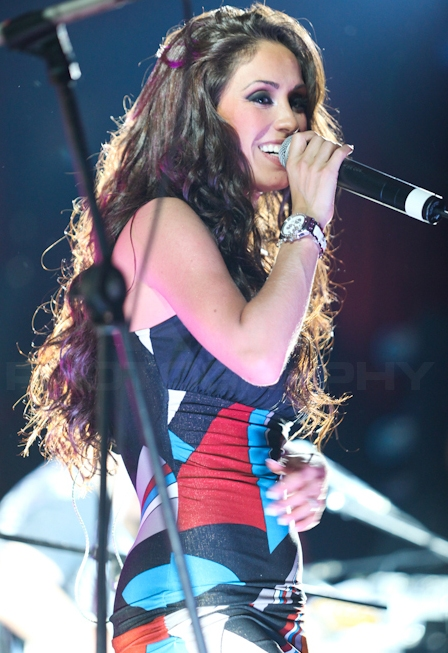
Anahí, winner for Best Revelation.

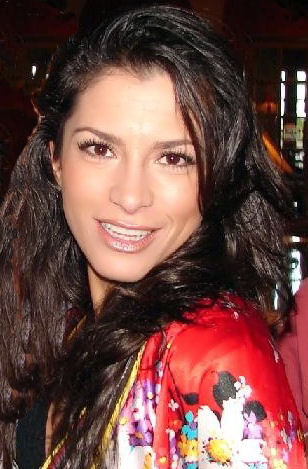
Alessandra Rosaldo, winner for Best Debut Actress.

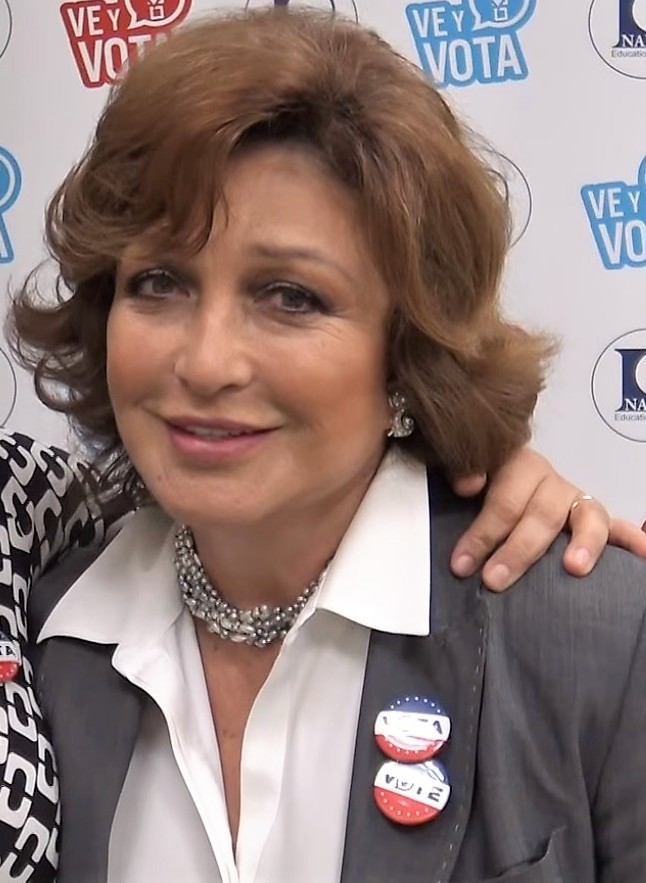
Angélica María, awarded with a Special Award for 50 Years of Career.

Best Telenovela	Best Original Story or Adaptation
Laberintos de pasión; Mujeres engañadas; Tres mujeres	Cuauhtémoc Blanco and Mª del Carmen Peña – Laberintos de pasión
Best Actress	Best Actor
Leticia Calderón – Laberintos de pasión; Erika Buenfil – Tres mujeres; Rebecca Jones – La vida en el espejo	Jorge Salinas – Tres mujeres; César Évora – Laberintos de pasión; Gonzalo Vega – La vida en el espejo
Best Antagonist Actress	Best Antagonist Actor
Mónika Sánchez – Laberintos de pasión; Alma Muriel – Nunca te olvidaré; Lupita Ferrer – Rosalinda	Manuel Ojeda – Laberintos de pasión; Humberto Elizondo – Nunca te olvidaré; Víctor Noriega – Mujeres engañadas
Best Leading Actress	Best Leading Actor
Norma Herrera – Tres mujeres; Irán Eory – Por tu amor; María Rubio – Laberintos de pasión	Eric del Castillo – Mujeres engañadas; Aarón Hernán – Laberintos de pasión; Joaquín Cordero – Por tu amor
Best Supporting Actress	Best Supporting Actor
Martha Roth – Mujeres engañadas; Angélica María – Rosalinda; Maite Embil – Tres mujeres	Héctor Bonilla – La vida en el espejo; Armando Araiza – Tres mujeres; Manuel Saval – Rosalinda
Best Young Lead Actress	Best Young Lead Actor
Karyme Lozano – Tres mujeres; Joana Benedek – Mujeres engañadas; Tiaré Scanda – Laberintos de pasión	Kuno Becker – Mujeres engañadas; Abraham Ramos – Laberintos de pasión; Jorge Salinas – Tres mujeres
Best Revelation	Best Debut Actress
Anahí – Mujeres engañadas; Arleth Terán – Tres mujeres; Sergio Sendel – Tres mujeres	Alessandra Rosaldo – DKDA: Sueños de juventud

=== Others ===
Best Musical Theme	Best Musical Theme Composer
"Laberintos de pasión" — Pedro Fernández – Laberintos de pasión	Jorge Avendaño — "Laberintos de pasión" – Laberintos de pasión
Best Direction	Best Direction of the Cameras
Sergio Jiménez – Mujeres engañadas	Pedro Damián and Carlos Sánchez Ross – Amor gitano
Best Extraordinary Production	Best Special Performance
José Alberto Castro – Serafín	Itatí Cantoral – Infierno en el paraíso
Best Comedic Performance	Best Host
Eugenio Derbez	Marco Antonio Regil

=== Special awards ===
- Best Art Design: Mirsa Paz for Amor gitano
- 50 Years of Career: Angélica María
- 25 Years of Musical Career: Emmanuel
- International Projection in Music: Pepe Aguilar
