= 13th TVyNovelas Awards =

1995 Mexican TV awards

- Date: April 29, 1995
- Location: México D.F.
- Hosted by: Edith González, Alfredo Adame & César Évora

Highlights
- Most awards: El vuelo del águila (10)
- Most nominations: Agujetas de color de rosa (14)

Television/radio coverage
- Network: Canal de las Estrellas

The 13th TVyNovelas Awards were an academy of special awards to the best soap operas and TV shows. The awards ceremony took place on April 29, 1995 in México D.F. The ceremony was televised in Mexico by Canal de las Estrellas.

Edith González, Alfredo Adame and César Évora hosted the show. El vuelo del águila won 10 awards, the most for the evening. Other winners Imperio de cristal won 7 awards, including Best Telenovela, Agujetas de color de rosa won 5 awards and Marimar and Volver a empezar won 1 each.

== Summary of awards and nominations ==
| Telenovela | Nominations | Awards |
|---|---|---|
| Agujetas de color de rosa | 14 | 5 |
| Imperio de cristal | 11 | 7 |
| El vuelo del águila | 10 | 10 |
| Marimar | 8 | 1 |
| Volver a empezar | 7 | 1 |
| Prisionera de amor | 2 | 0 |

== Winners and nominees ==
=== Telenovelas ===
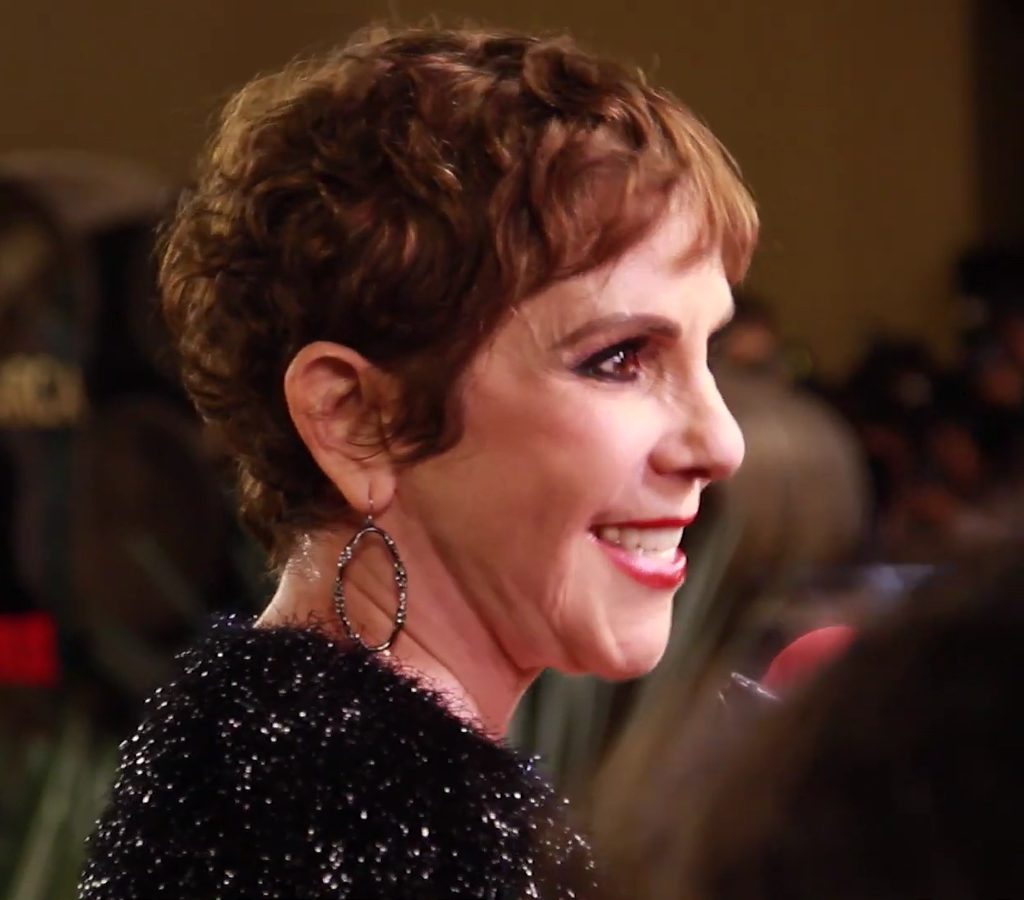
Rebecca Jones, winner for Best Actress.

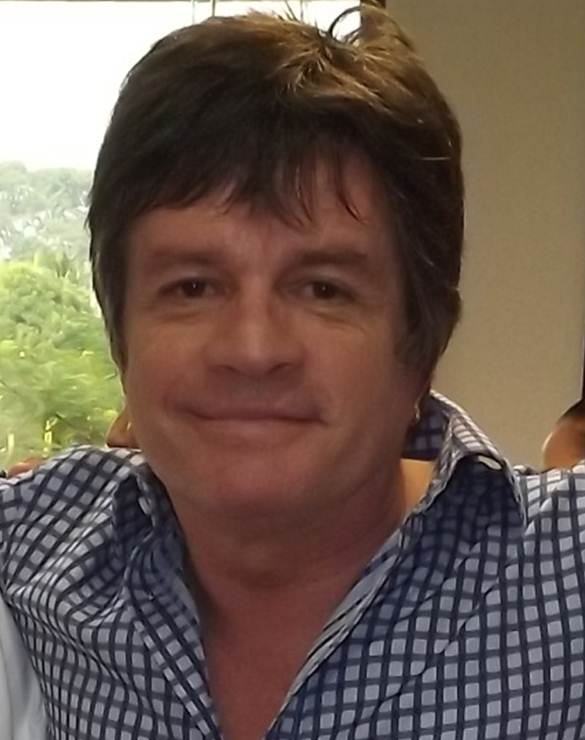
Alejandro Camacho, winner for Best Antagonist Actor.

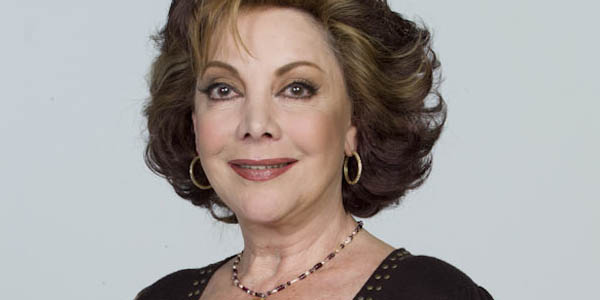
Jacqueline Andere, winner for Best Leading Actress.

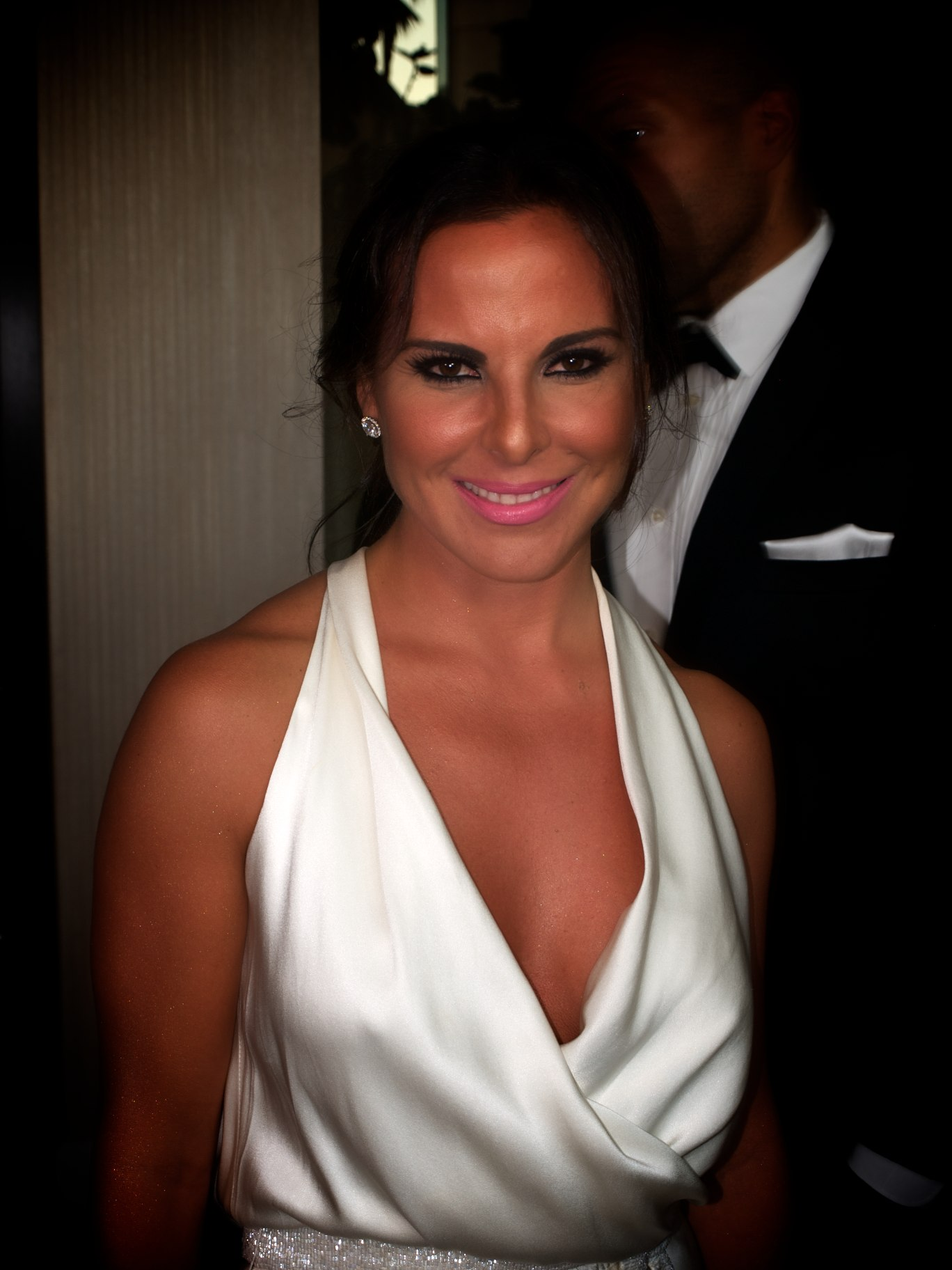
Kate del Castillo, winner for Best Young Lead Actress.

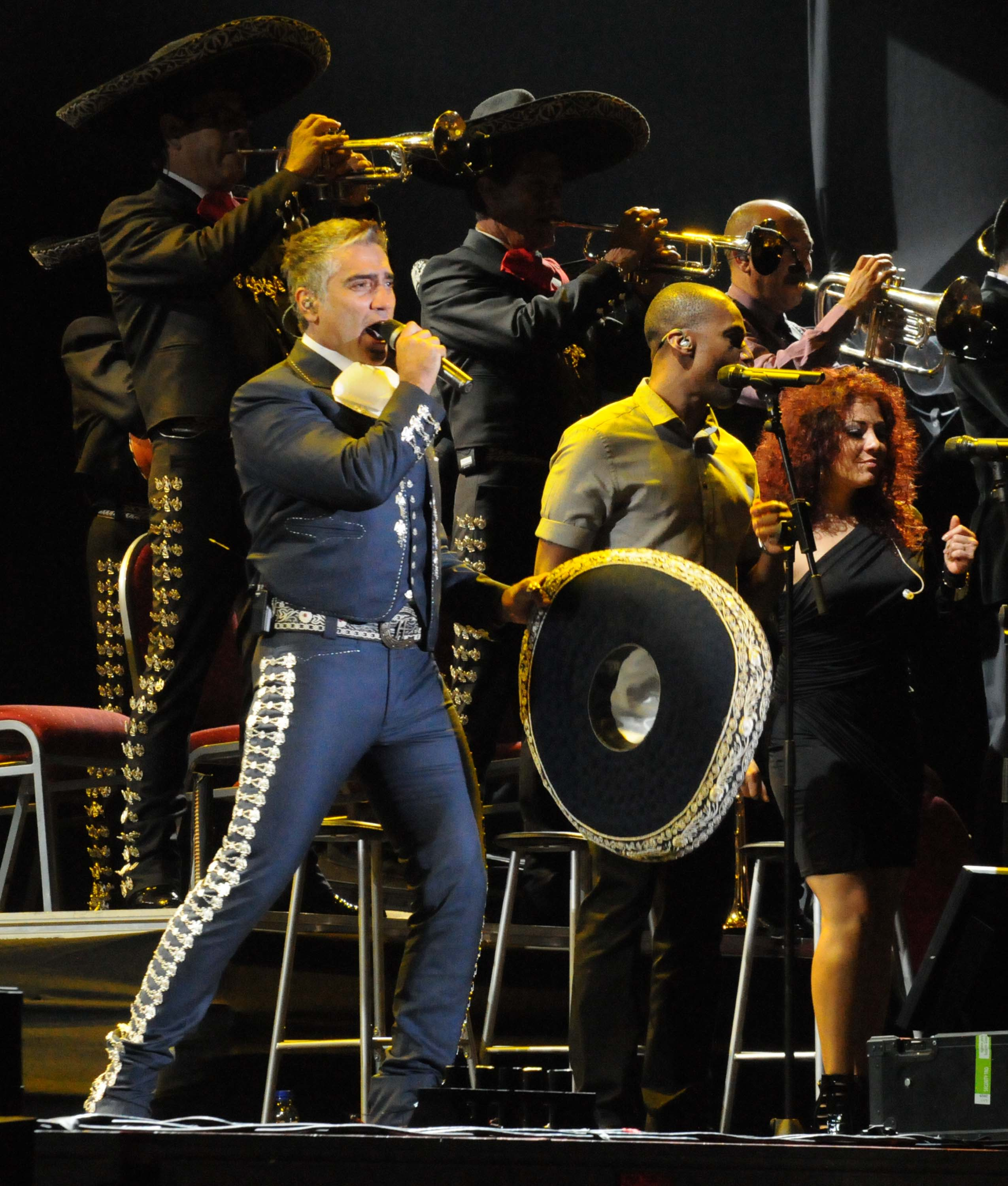
Alejandro Fernández, winner for Revelation as a Singer.

| Best Telenovela | Best Musical Theme |
|---|---|
| Imperio de cristal; Agujetas de color de rosa; Volver a empezar | "Don Porfirio" — Daniel Catán – El vuelo del águila |
| Best Actress | Best Actor |
| Rebecca Jones – Imperio de cristal; Angélica María – Agujetas de color de rosa; Thalía – Marimar | Humberto Zurita – El vuelo del águila; Ari Telch – Imperio de cristal; Eduardo Capetillo – Marimar |
| Best Antagonist Actress | Best Antagonist Actor |
| María Rubio – Imperio de cristal; Chantal Andere – Marimar; Julieta Egurrola – Prisionera de amor | Alejandro Camacho – Imperio de cristal; Rafael Sánchez Navarro – Volver a empezar; Toño Infante – Marimar |
| Best Leading Actress | Best Leading Actor |
| Jacqueline Andere – El vuelo del águila; Carmelita González – Volver a empezar; María Teresa Rivas – Agujetas de color de rosa | Ignacio López Tarso – Imperio de cristal; Alberto Vázquez – Agujetas de color de rosa; Tito Guízar – Marimar |
| Best Co-lead Actress | Best Co-lead Actor |
| Patricia Reyes Spíndola – El vuelo del águila; Cecilia Gabriela – Imperio de cristal; Frances Ondiviela – Marimar | Pedro Weber "Chatanuga" – Agujetas de color de rosa; Alejandro Tommasi – Imperio de cristal; Miguel Palmer – Marimar |
| Best Young Lead Actress | Best Young Lead Actor |
| Kate del Castillo – Imperio de cristal; Gabriela Hassel – Agujetas de color de rosa; Karla Álvarez – Prisionera de amor | Germán Gutiérrez – Imperio de cristal; Alexis Ayala – Agujetas de color de rosa; Guillermo García Cantú – Volver a empezar |
| Best Female Revelation | Best Male Revelation |
| Natalia Esperón – Agujetas de color de rosa; Claudia Silva – Volver a empezar; Irán Castillo – Agujetas de color de rosa | Flavio César – Agujetas de color de rosa; José María Torre – Agujetas de color de rosa; Radamés de Jesús – Volver a empezar |
| Best Child Performance | Best Original Story or Adaptation |
| Marisol Centeno – Agujetas de color de rosa; Felipe Colombo – Agujetas de color de rosa; Zoraida Gómez – Imperio de cristal | Enrique Krauze and Fausto Cerón-Medina – El vuelo del águila |
| Best Direction | Best Direction of the Cameras |
| Gonzalo Martínez Ortega and Jorge Fons – El vuelo del águila | Jesús Acuña Lee and Carlos Guerra – El vuelo del águila |

=== Others ===
| Best Production | Best Performance |
|---|---|
| Carlos Sotomayor – El vuelo del águila | Manuel Ojeda – El vuelo del águila |
| Best Comedic Performance | Best Female Singer |
| Eugenio Derbez – Al derecho y al derbez | Lucero |
| Revelation as a Singer | Most Versatile Band |
| Alejandro Fernández | Grupo Bronco |

=== Special awards ===
- Pioneer in Historical Telenovelas: Ernesto Alonso for El vuelo del águila
- Best Teen Telenovela: Agujetas de color de rosa
- Highest-rated Telenovela in Mexico: Volver a empezar
- Highest-rated Telenovela in the United States: Marimar
- Career as an Actress: Katy Jurado
- Career as an Actor: Tito Guizar
- Career as a Singer: Lupita D'Alessio
- Career as a Composer: Armando Manzanero

=== Absent ===
People who did not attend the ceremony and were nominated in the shortlist in each category:

- Emilio Larrosa
- Humberto Zurita
- Katy Jurado
- Patricia Reyes Spindola
- Pedro Weber "Chatanuga"
