= Zoila Quiñones =

Mexican actress (1940–2024)

Zoila Quiñones (16 April 1940 – 24 March 2024) was a Mexican actress and comedian.

== Biography ==
Zoila Quiñones was born in Mexico City, Mexico on 16 April 1940.

Quiñones is remembered as the character Adalina in the comedy Mi secretaria (English: My Secretary) which was on air between 1978 and 1986. Zoila portrayed a sweet-toothed, energetic secretary who maintained a great friendship with Lupita, the protagonist (played by Lupita Lara).

Additionally, she acted in various telenovelas from the 60s, on programs such as Lágrimas amargas (English: Bitter Tears), Ana del aire (English: Ana of the Air), Mañana será otro día (English: Tomorrow's Another Day), Más allá del puente (English: Beyond the Bridge), Soñadoras (English: Dreamers), Amigas y rivales (English: Friends and Rivals), La otra (English: The Other Woman) and En nombre del amor (English: In the Name of Love), among others.

Quiñones also stood out in dubbing, where she lent her voice to movies such as Tarzan's Greatest Adventure, Bus Stop, Quo Vadis, and the 1949 version of Little Women. She was the voice of Marcia Brady in the series The Brady Bunch and the second voice of Agent 99 in the series Get Smart.

Quiñones died on 24 March 2024, at the age of 83.

== Filmography ==
=== Telenovelas and series ===
- Telecomedia de Manolo Fábregas (1952)
- Janina (1962)
- Apasionada (1964) .... Lourdes
- Tormenta de pasiones (1965)
- Lágrimas amargas (1967)
- Un pobre hombre (1967) .... Luisa
- Águeda (1968) .... Carmen
- El padre Guernica (1968)
- La sonrisa del diablo (1970) .... Patricia
- Ana del aire (1974) .... Elena
- Mañana será otro día (1976–1977) .... Helenita
- Mi secretaria (1978–1986) .... Adalina
- Carrusel (1989–1990) Hospital Nurse
- Más allá del puente (1993–1994) .... Margarita
- Agujetas de color de rosa (1994–1995)
- Alondra (1995)
- Canción de amor (1996) .... Ofelia
- Soñadoras (1998–1999) .... Maite
- Mujeres engañadas (1999–2000) .... Concepcion's Mother
- Amigas y rivales (2001) .... Adelaida
- La otra (2002) .... Simona Díaz
- Mujer de madera (2004–2005) .... Adelaida Portillo
- Pablo y Andrea (2005) ... Concha
- Muchachitas como tú (2007) .... Professor Custodia Zamarripa
- En nombre del amor (2008–2009) .... Meche
- Hasta que el dinero nos separe (2009–2010) ....Ramírez's Mother
- Dos hogares (2011–2012)

== Dubbing ==
=== Films ===
- A Tale of Two Cities (1935) .... Lucie Manette
- Camille (1937) .... Camille's friend
- Courage of Lassie (1946) .... Kattie (Elizabeth Taylor)
- The Ghost and Mrs. Muir (1947) .... Anna Muir
- Little Women (1949) .... Elizabeth "Beth" March
- Red River (1949) .... Fen
- Quo Vadis (1951) .... Eunice
- The Greatest Show on Earth (1952) .... Trapeze Artist
- Bus Stop (1955) .... Elma Duckworth (Hope Lange)
- Tarzan's Greatest Adventure (1959) .... Angie
- Journey to the Center of the Earth (1959) .... Jenny Lindenbrook
- King of Kings (1961) .... Salomé (Brigid Bazlen)
- Geronimo (1962) .... Huera
- National Lampoon's Vacation (1983) .... Ellen Griswold (Beverly D'Angelo)

=== Television series ===
- Get Smart .... Agent 99 (Second voice) (Barbara Feldon)
- The Brady Bunch .... Marcia Brady (Maureen McCormick)
- Princess Comet .... Princess Comet (Yumiko Kokonoe)
- Land of the Giants .... Betty Hamilton

=== Episodic characters ===
- The High Chaparral .... Tina Granger (episode 37)

=== Animated series ===
- Pac-Man .... Sue
- Drak Pak .... Vampira
