= Amor gitano (TV series) =

Mexican telenovela

- Genre: Telenovela; Romance; Drama
- Written by: María Eugenia Cervantes; Katia R. Estrada; Katia Rodríguez
- Directed by: Pedro Damián
- Starring: Alejandro Camacho; Mariana Seoane; Mauricio Islas; Nailea Norvind
- Opening theme: Amor gitano by Carlos Enrique Iglesias
- Country of origin: Mexico
- Original language: Spanish
- No. of episodes: 55

Production
- Executive producer: Pedro Damián
- Producer: Georgina Castro
- Production locations: Filming; Televisa San Ángel; Mexico City, Mexico
- Cinematography: Carlos Sánchez Ross
- Running time: 41-44 minutes
- Production company: Televisa

Original release
- Network: Canal de las Estrellas
- Release: May 3 – July 16, 1999

Related
- La mujer de aquella noche (1969); Amor gitano (1983)

Amor gitano (English: Gypsy love) is a Mexican telenovela produced by Pedro Damián for Televisa in 1999. Is adapted the 1983 Argentinian telenovela Amor gitano original story by Delia González Márquez and the 1969 Puerto Rican telenovela La mujer de aquella noche original story by Olga Ruilopez.

On Monday, May 3, 1999, Canal de las Estrellas started broadcasting Amor gitano weekdays at 7:00pm, replacing Soñadoras. The last episode was broadcast on Friday, July 16, 1999 with Alma rebelde replacing it the following Monday.

It starred Alejandro Camacho, Mariana Seoane, Mauricio Islas and Nailea Norvind.

== Cast ==
- Mariana Seoane as Adriana Astolfi, Marquise of Astolfi, Countess of Farnesio, Countess of Minelli
- Mauricio Islas as Renzo, Count of Minelli
- Alejandro Camacho as Rodolfo Farnesio, Count of Farnesio
- Nailea Norvind as Isa Valenti, Marquise of Astolfi
- María Rubio as Isolda
- Maya Mishalska as Astrid de Marnier, Countess of Marnier, Countess of Minelli, Dowager Countess of Minelli
- Raquel Olmedo as Manina
- Manuel Ojeda as Pedro Minelli, Count of Minelli
- María Teresa Rivas as Aya Petra
- Héctor Gómez as Bernal
- Roberto Palazuelos as Claudio
- Alberto Estrella as Jonás
- Khotan as Humberto de Astolfi, Marquis of Astolfi
- Susana González as Zokka
- Ana Layevska as María
- Valentino Lanús as Patricio
- Juan Carlos Colombo as Martín
- Mario Prudom as Renán
- Humberto Yañez as Danilo
- Rubén Cerda as Fray Quintín
- Nuria Bages as Constanza de Astolfi, Dowager Marquise of Astolfi
- Alec Von Bargen as Dino
- Eduardo Arroyuelo as Daniel di Scarpa
- Karla Albarrán as Aya
- Iván Bronstein as Baltazar
- Andrea García as Lucrecia
- Sherlyn as Rosalinda
- Adriana Acosta as Cleopatra
- Gerardo Albarrán as Bernardo Le Baun
- Héctor Sánchez as Orlando
- Yadira Santana as Basiliza
- Enrique Borja Baena as Santiago

== Awards ==
| Year | Award | Category | Nominee | Result |
|---|---|---|---|---|
| 2000 | 18th TVyNovelas Awards | Best Direction of the Cameras | Pedro Damián; Carlos Sánchez Ross | Won |
| 2000 | 18th TVyNovelas Awards | Best Art Direction | Mirsa Paz | Won |
