= El vuelo del águila =

Television series

- Genre: Telenovela
- Created by: Enrique Krauze; Fausto Zerón Medina
- Written by: Liliana Abud; Eduardo Gallegos; Antonio Monsell; Tere Medina
- Directed by: Gonzalo Martínez Ortega; Jorge Fons; Claudio Reyes Rubio; Jesús Moreno; Federico Farfán
- Starring: Manuel Ojeda; Humberto Zurita; Jacqueline Andere; Mariana Levy
- Opening theme: "Don Porfirio" by Daniel Catán
- Country of origin: Mexico
- Original language: Spanish
- No. of episodes: 140

Production
- Executive producer: Ernesto Alonso
- Producer: Carlos Sotomayor
- Cinematography: Jesús Acuña Lee; Carlos Guerra Villareal
- Running time: 21-22 minutes
- Production company: Televisa

Original release
- Network: Canal de las Estrellas
- Release: July 4, 1994 – January 20, 1995

El vuelo del águila (The Flight of the Eagle) is a Mexican telenovela produced by Carlos Sotomayor under the supervision of Ernesto Alonso for Televisa in 1994-1995.

The series is based on the life of the General and later President of Mexico Porfirio Díaz, from whose name the term "Porfirian Era" or "Porfiriato" was derived to denote the period of his government, which dated from 1876 to 1911.

The main character was portrayed by Fabián Robles, Humberto Zurita and Manuel Ojeda during the different stages of his life.

== Plot ==
A military hero in the Reform Wars, Porfirio Díaz was also one of the strategists behind the overthrow of the empire by Republicans. Several times he tried to attain power through military coups, but was defeated until a last revolt in 1876 took him to the Presidency of the Republic.

Except for a short period of four years, he governed until 1911, when a takeover by Francisco I. Madero forced him into exile. He lived long enough to see his revolution fall apart and all of his gains destroyed by his own lengthy stay in power.

As a hero, Porfirio Diaz learns, fights, plots, governs, kills, pacificies, loves, suffers, cries, devotes himself to his work and does not abandon it until his own people rise to expel him.

== Cast ==
=== Main ===
- Manuel Ojeda as Porfirio Díaz (Adult)
- Humberto Zurita as Porfirio Díaz (Young)
- Jacqueline Andere as Carmen Romero Rubio (Adult)
- Mariana Levy as Carmen Romero Rubio (Young)

=== Recurring and guest stars ===
- Ismael Aguilar as Tomás Mejía
- Beatriz Aguirre as Agustina Castelló Rivas (Adult)
- Isabel Andrade as Desideria Díaz
- Roberto Antúnez as Cenobio Márquez
- Armando Araiza as Bolero
- Roberto Ballesteros as Vicente Guerrero
- Luis Bayardo as Francisco I. Madero
- Óscar Bonfiglio as Gustavo A. Madero
- Socorro Bonilla as Margarita Maza
- Diana Bracho as Sara Pérez Romero
- Claudio Brook as Manuel Romero Rubio
- Raúl Buenfil as Ignacio Zaragoza
- Quintín Bulnes as Henry Lane Wilson
- Juan Carlos Casasola as Francisco Zarco
- Mario Casillas as Carlos Pacheco
- Óscar Castañeda as Emiliano Zapata
- César Castro as Sebastián Lerdo de Tejada
- Martha Mariana Castro as Rafaela Quiñónes / Justa Saavedra
- Lumi Cavazos as Amada Díaz
- Jorge Celaya as Esteban Aragón
- Uri Chartarifsky as José
- Uriel Chávez as Homobono
- Eugenio Cobo as Venustiano Carranza
- Juan Carlos Colombo as Melchor Ocampo
- Carlos Corres as Justo Benítez (16 years old)
- Constantino Costas as Espinoza / Gorostiza
- Pedro Damián as José María Pino Suárez
- Roberto D'Amico as Manuel González Flores (Adult)
- Alma Delfina as Delfina Ortega Díaz
- Carlos East as Enrique Flores Magón
- Julieta Egurrola as Luisa Romero Rubio
- Humberto Elizondo as Manuel Mondragón
- Irán Eory as Agustina Castelló Rivas (Young)
- José Antonio Ferral as Father Pardo
- Laura Flores as Carlota of Mexico
- Esteban Franco as Félix Díaz
- Rocío Gallardo as Damiana
- Juan Pablo Garciadiego as Luis Mier y Terán
- Fidel Garriga as José María Iglesias
- Jaime Garza as Ricardo Flores Magón
- Luis Gimeno as Napoleon III
- Magda Giner as María Cañas Buch
- Miguel Gómez Checa as Marcos Pérez
- Ernesto Gómez Cruz as Benito Juárez
- Tomás Goros as Jesús González Ortega
- Salma Hayek as Juana Catalina Romero
- Mel Herrera as Porfirio Díaz Ortega
- Aarón Hernán as Bernardo Reyes
- Blanca Ireri as Delfina Ortega Díaz (9 years old)
- José Antonio Iturriaga as Flavio Maldonado
- Israel Jaitovich as Manuel González Flores (Young)
- Luz María Jerez as Doña Inés
- Eduardo Liñán as François Achille Bazaine
- Dulce María as Delfina Ortega Díaz (Child)
- Ángeles Marín as Nicolasa Díaz
- Beatriz Martínez as Princess Sophie of Bavaria
- Gonzalo Martínez Ortega as Pancho Villa
- Mario Iván Martínez as Maximilian I of Mexico
- Antonio Medellín as Felipe Berriozábal
- Ramón Menéndez as Manuel González de Cosío
- Raúl Meraz as Francisco León de la Barra
- Marystell Molina as Paula de Anda
- Roberto Montiel as Dr. Manuel Antonio Ortega
- Óscar Morelli as Ignacio Martínez de Pinillos
- José Luis Moreno López as Ignacio Mejía
- Frank Moro as Lorenzo
- Juan Carlos Muñoz as Miguel Miramón
- Montserrat Ontiveros as Nicolasa Díaz (16 years old) / Sofía Romero Rubio
- Claudia Ortega as Manuela Díaz (18 years old)
- Adalberto Parra as Juan Almonte
- Mariana Ramírez Navarrete as Luz Aurora Victoria Díaz
- Tito Reséndiz as Ignacio Comonfort
- Patricia Reyes Spíndola as Petrona Mori
- Bruno Rey as Victoriano Huerta
- Guillermo Rivas as Pelagio Antonio de Labastida y Dávalos
- Fabián Robles as Porfirio Díaz (15 years old)
- Julián Robles as Félix Díaz (15 years old)
- Juan Romanca as Guillermo Prieto
- Alejandro Ruiz as Justo Benítez
- Roberto Ruy as Juan
- Héctor Sáez as Jerónimo Treviño
- Polo Salazar as López Lazcano
- Óscar Sánchez as Durán Roa
- Salvador Sánchez as Ignacio Ramírez
- Sergio Sánchez as José Ives Limantour
- Eduardo Santamarina as Dr. Manuel Antonio Ortega Reyes
- Juan Carlos Serrán as Félix Zuloaga
- Evangelina Sosa as Delfina Ortega Díaz (Young)
- Moisés Suárez as José Agustín Domínguez y Díaz
- Roberto Tello as Melitón
- Gastón Tuset as Mariano Escobedo
- Zulema Williams as Vicenta
- Luis Xavier as Franz Joseph I of Austria

== Awards and nominations ==
Year	Award	Category	Nominee	Result
1995	13th TVyNovelas Awards	Pioneer in Historical Telenovelas	Ernesto Alonso	Won
1995	13th TVyNovelas Awards	Best Production	Carlos Sotomayor	Won
1995	13th TVyNovelas Awards	Best Performance	Manuel Ojeda	Won
1995	13th TVyNovelas Awards	Best Actor	Humberto Zurita	Won
1995	13th TVyNovelas Awards	Best Leading Actress	Jacqueline Andere	Won
1995	13th TVyNovelas Awards	Best Co-lead Actress	Patricia Reyes Spíndola	Won
1995	13th TVyNovelas Awards	Best Musical Theme	"Don Porfirio" by Daniel Catán	Won
1995	13th TVyNovelas Awards	Best Original Story or Adaptation	Enrique Krauze; Fausto Zerón-Medina	Won
1995	13th TVyNovelas Awards	Best Direction	Gonzalo Martínez Ortega; Jorge Fons	Won
1995	13th TVyNovelas Awards	Best Direction of the Cameras	Jesús Acuña Lee; Carlos Guerra	Won
1995	Bravo Awards	Best Actress	Patricia Reyes Spíndola	Won
1995	El Heraldo de México Awards	Best Telenovela	Ernesto Alonso	Won
1995	El Heraldo de México Awards	Best Actress	Patricia Reyes Spíndola	Nominated
1995	El Heraldo de México Awards	Best Actor	Ernesto Gómez Cruz	Nominated
1995	El Heraldo de México Awards	Best Actor	Humberto Zurita	Nominated
1995	El Heraldo de México Awards	Best Actor	Manuel Ojeda	Won
1996	Latin ACE Awards	Best Dramatized Cultural Program	Carlos Sotomayor; Gonzalo Martínez Ortega	Won
1996	Latin ACE Awards	Best Actress	Patricia Reyes Spíndola	Won
