= Abandonada (TV series) =

Mexican telenovela

- Genre: Telenovela; Drama
- Created by: Inés Rodena
- Written by: Carlos Romero; Tere Medina
- Directed by: Rafael Banquells
- Starring: María Sorté; José Alonso; Miguel Ángel Ferriz; María Rubio; Oscar Servin; Lupita Pallás
- Opening theme: Abandonada by María Sorté
- Country of origin: Mexico
- Original language: Spanish

Production
- Executive producer: Alfredo Saldaña
- Cinematography: Antonio Acevedo
- Production company: Televisa

Original release
- Network: Canal de las Estrellas
- Release: April 15 – September 30, 1985

Related
- Te amo; El ángel caído; Nunca te olvidaré; Mujer bonita (2001)

Abandonada (English title:Abandoned) is a Mexican telenovela produced by Alfredo Saldaña for Televisa in 1985. It is based on the radionovela "La mesera", which is the original story of Inés Rodena and adapted by Carlos Romero.

María Sorté and José Alonso starred as protagonists.

== Plot ==
Daniela is a young girl who falls in love with Mario Alberto, a young wealthy man. Carolina, the mother of Mario Alberto is strongly opposed to the relationship. Mario Alberto courts Daniela, gets her pregnant and then abandons her. Shattered, Daniela is unable to raise her child alone until Ernesto, a kindly man, reaches out and ends up falling for her. However, after the death of her son, Carolina blames Daniela for the misfortune and seeks revenge.

== Cast ==
- María Sorté as Daniela
- José Alonso as Ernesto
- Miguel Ángel Ferriz as Mario Alberto
- María Rubio as Carolina
- Oscar Servin as Joaquín
- Lupita Pallás as Cupertina
- Julio Monterde as Alberto
- Alejandra Ávalos as Alicia
- Mónica Miguel as Luisa
- Ariadna Welter as Lucrecia
- Ricardo Cervantes as Enrique
- Pedro Infante Jr. as Omar
- Yolanda Ciani as Marcia
- Antonio de Hud as Julián
- Gloria Silva as Blanca
- Antonio Henaine as Dionisio
- Antonio Brillas as Martínez
- Lili Inclán as Josefita
- Justo Martínez as Eleuterio
- Ana María Aguirre as Mariana
- Mariana Maesse as China
- Melba Luna as Dominga
- Rocío Sobrado as Milagros
- Edith Kleiman as Doctora
- Mary Paz Banquells as Margarita
- Armando Báez as Peña
- Yamil Atala as Chemo
- Diana Xochitl as Julia
- Alfonso Barclay as Elpidio
- Luz Elena Silva as Regina
- Olivia Chavira as Bernarda
- Imperio Vargas as Patricia
- Norma Iturbe as Carmela
- Romy Mendoza as Nelly
- Ana Gloria Blanch as Neighbor

== Awards ==
Year	Award	Category	Nominee	Result
1986	4th TVyNovelas Awards	Best Direction	Rafael Banquells	Nominated
