= Cuna de lobos =

- Genre: Telenovela
- Created by: Carlos Olmos
- Directed by: Carlos Téllez
- Creative director: Javier Terrazas
- Starring: Gonzalo Vega; Diana Bracho; Alejandro Camacho; Rebecca Jones
- Music by: Pedro Plascencia Salinas
- Country of origin: Mexico
- Original language: Spanish
- No. of episodes: 170 (original); 85 (rebroadcast)

Production
- Executive producer: Carlos Téllez
- Producer: Rubén Piña
- Production company: Televisa

Original release
- Network: Canal de las Estrellas
- Release: October 13, 1986 – June 5, 1987

Cuna de lobos (English: Den of Wolves) is a Mexican thriller telenovela created by Carlos Olmos and produced by Carlos Téllez for Televisa. It was originally broadcast by Canal de las Estrellas (now known simply as Las Estrellas) between 1986 and 1987. It focuses on the struggle for power within a wealthy Mexican pharmaceutical dynasty. Departing from the conventions of contemporary telenovelas, Cuna de lobos features elements of irony and murder, and it was the first Mexican telenovela broadcast in a primetime evening slot.

The series stars Gonzalo Vega as José Carlos, Diana Bracho as Leonora, Alejandro Camacho as Alejandro, Rebecca Jones as Vilma, and María Rubio as the matriarch Catalina Creel. Cuna de lobos was a ratings success in its native Mexico and Rubio's performance received particular attention. Such was her character's popularity that signs read Catalina Creel for President the day after the finale. The show was also broadcast in other countries such as Germany and Brazil and inspired a loose adaptation in Spain.

A pilot was filmed in 2010 for a new show titled Por derecho de sangre, but it never went to series. A remake titled Cuna de lobos premiered on Televisa in 2019.

== Synopsis ==
The show opens on Carlos Larios (Raúl Meraz) and the one-eyed Catalina Larios Creel (María Rubio), owners of the powerful Lar-Creel pharmaceutical company. Carlos accuses Catalina of lying to him. He says he is going to change his will and divorce her. Catalina picks up a vial of poison and declares to the camera: "No me dejas otra alternativa, Carlos. Es tu... o yo." (You leave me no other choice, Carlos. It's you... or me.) Carlos then dies in a suspicious car accident after having a heart attack.

Her plan backfires when she learns that his will bequeathed the company to the firstborn son of either of his children: Alejandro (Alejandro Camacho), Catalina's favorite, or José Carlos (Gonzalo Vega), her stepson. Alejandro's wife, Vilma (Rebecca Jones) infertile. He tells her they will secretly adopt a child and persuades her to feign a pregnancy of her own. Alejandro begins a secret romance with the working-class Leonora Navarro (Diana Bracho), who was present at Carlos's death. He brings her to the Larios family penthouse, claiming that his mother would not approve of their love. Leonora marries Alejandro in a fake wedding ceremony. Her godmother Doña Esperanza (Carmen Montejo) comes to live with her in the penthouse. Doña Esperanza suspects deception but has a stroke at the moment she might have exposed it.

The audience learns that Catalina's eyepatch conceals a perfectly healthy eye. She has spent decades falsely claiming that José Carlos blinded her with a spinning top, a lie that poisoned his standing in the family. She wears a blonde wig when conducting clandestine business. When Catalina discovers Alejandro's scheme, she judges him too reckless to be trusted. She stabs Vilma with a fire poker to reveal that the pregnancy is merely a pillow under Vilma's dress. When the heir is born, Alejandro takes the child from Leonora to present as Vilma's son. Catalina orders Leonora killed; Leonora escapes but is confined to a psychiatric institution.

A year later, Leonora seduces José Carlos to gain entry to the Larios mansion and seek revenge on Catalina. She finds herself genuinely falling in love and marries him. Leonora and Catalina wage a quiet war of attrition inside the mansion with neither able to move openly against the other. Leonora forms an alliance with Bertha (Rosa María Bianchi), Catalina's personal secretary, who has inside knowledge of Catalina's crimes and has lived in terror of her employer. The family starts to fracture when José Carlos learns that the child, little Edgar, is Leonora's biological son. Leonora arrives at Catalina's birthday costume party dressed in the blonde wig and trench coat from the latter's double life. The resulting confrontation leads Alejandro to learn that Catalina murdered his father. He sends little Edgar to his in-laws and distances himself from his mother.

Catalina tracks down Bertha, who has gone into hiding and runs a travel agency. She strangles Bertha's associate and runs Bertha off the road in a car crash. The accident inadvertently brings her to a clinic where a doctor reveals to José Carlos that his mother has perfect vision in both eyes. José Carlos confronts her alone at dinner, naming her as his father's murderer. The secret of the eye patch is spoken aloud between them.

With her family turning on her, Catalina makes one final move. She tampers with the fuel tank of the family plane, intending to kill José Carlos. Alejandro and Vilma are instead killed in the explosion. On receiving the news, Catalina dresses in her blonde wig, removes her eyepatch, and drinks the same poison she used to murder her husband. The series ends with an epilogue five years later: Leonora and José Carlos's young son finds Catalina's eyepatch in the room where she died. He places it over his own eye, and says, "Yo no soy Braulio, soy el pequeño Edgar." (I'm not Braulio, I'm little Edgar.)

== Cast ==
=== Main ===
- Gonzalo Vega as José Carlos
- Diana Bracho as Leonora
- Alejandro Camacho as Alejandro
- Rebecca Jones as Vilma
- María Rubio as Catalina

=== Recurring and guest stars ===
- Carmen Montejo as Esperanza
- Lilia Aragón as Rosalía
- Carlos Cámara as Gutiérrez
- Edna Bolkán as Paulina
- Humberto Elizondo as Suárez
- Rosa María Bianchi as Bertha
- Josefina Echánove as Elvia
- Ana Bertha Espín as Mayra
- Miguel Gómez Checa as Terán
- Blanca Torres as Cleotilde
- Enrique Muñoz as Curiel
- Luis Rivera as Mauricio
- Lourdes Canale as Carmelita
- Julia Alfonzo as Lutecia
- Raúl Meraz as Carlos

== Awards ==
Year	Award	Category	Nominee(s)	Result
1987	TVyNovelas Awards	Best Telenovela	Carlos Téllez	Won
1987	TVyNovelas Awards	Best Actress	Rebecca Jones	Won
1987	TVyNovelas Awards	Best Antagonist Actress	María Rubio	Won
1987	TVyNovelas Awards	Best Antagonist Actor	Alejandro Camacho	Won
1987	TVyNovelas Awards	Best Experienced Actress	María Rubio	Won
1987	TVyNovelas Awards	Best Original Story or Adaptation	Carlos Olmos	Won
1987	TVyNovelas Awards	Best Direction	Carlos Téllez	Won

== Production ==
Cuna de lobos was created by Carlos Olmos and directed and produced by Carlos Téllez. The pair met in the 1970s and collaborated on La pasión de Isabela in 1984. They developed a reputation for challenging genre formulas and completing scripts in advance to give their projects a cohesive vision. The character of Catalina Creel was inspired by Bette Davis, a U.S. film star. In The Anniversary, Davis played Mrs. Taggart, a manipulative widow with an eye patch; the final scene of Cuna de lobos is an homage to her character.

Televisa executives found Olmos and Téllez's idea for a thriller telenovela strange. Cuna broke with the romantic conventions of other telenovelas, and the project lacked a bankable star. Olmos asked Gonzalo Valdés Medellín who should play his villain. The latter was a fan of María Rubio from her performance on Rina in 1977. She accepted, believing that she was at the right age yet still had adequate energy to play the matriarch. Luis Reyes de la Maza, a playwright who had penned a series of successful scripts for Televisa and served as an executive, played a role in greenlighting the project. He was Rubio's husband at the time. Téllez cast a mixture of known stage actors like Alejandro Camacho and "new talent" like Rubio, Diana Bracho, and Rebecca Jones rather than rely on Televisa's roster of established names.

At Téllez's direction, costume designers evoked Joan Crawford's style from the 1940s and gave Catalina Creel shoulder pads to make her presence larger. Her high fashion with eye patches that matched her outfits became a signature element of the show. In a 2007 Televisa retrospective titled 50 Años de la telenovela (Fifty Years of the Telenovela), Víctor Hugo Rascón Banda, one of the show's writers, said he had not seen The Anniversary. He credited Olmos for Creel's sense of dark humor with her wardrobe. Alejandro Camacho attributed "a large dose of black humor" to the show's success and believed it changed the telenovela genre.

The role of Leonora was first offered to Angélica Aragón. She found the plot too similar to Vivir un poco, her previous project. "Imagine, I was looking for my children for a year, and now I had to look for others. I wanted to change a little." Diana Bracho was initially cast as the villainous Vilma. When Aragón declined to participate, production was delayed for two weeks before Bracho took on the role of Leonora and Rebecca Jones was cast as Vilma.

The cast recalled a chaotic production schedule. The number of episodes was increased as the show grew in popularity, but the actors were at first unaware of the show's reception as they continued filming. At one point Bracho, who was pregnant in real life while portraying her character as such on the show, faced an extrauterine pregnancy with internal bleeding. She was taken to the hospital and told that she could die within three hours. She had to remain in hospital for two to three weeks.

== Broadcast history ==
The show was broadcast as 170 half-hour installments between 1986 and 1987. This was shorter than the 200+ episodes of many contemporary telenovelas. Broadcasting at 9pm, it became the first telenovela shown in primetime and was noted for attracting both male and female viewers; up to that point, telenovelas were broadcast earlier in the day and watched by women. The first episode features Catalina Creel killing her husband in cold blood, also a first for Mexican television.

Cuna de lobos was later broadcast in the United States and debuted on the German broadcaster RTL on August 21, 1991. The German broadcast was shown as 85 episodes of 45 minutes each. It became an important cultural export, broadcast in some 185 countries by 2015. The Guardian listed it among influential telenovelas leading to a 2006 effort by the BBC to enter the format.

The show was retitled Ambição (Ambition) for broadcast on the Brazilian television network SBT. It ran from late 1991 to 1992, with a rebroadcast from 1992 to 1993. In the early 2000s, executives wanted to produce a local version of the show. They were unable to secure the rights because a remake would compete with rebroadcasts of the original.

The Spanish series La verdad de Laura was loosely based on Cuna de lobos. It was produced in 2002 by TVE and the production company Europroducciones with the collaboration of Televisa. This version stars Mónica Estarreado and Mariano Alameda. It attempted to bring the telenovela format, which had been looked down upon, to Spain. Variety observed that despite telenovelas' success on Spain's main over-the-air broadcaster, they "continue to fare poorly" on more upscale pay television channels. Starting as a replacement for El secreto, another telenovela by the same producer, La verdad de Laura increased its ratings share from 19.5% in its January premiere to 34.5% in July of that year. The finale was watched by 3.9 million people, corresponding to a 37.0% share.

== Reception ==
Cuna de lobos proved popular in its native Mexico. It was noted for husbands watching with their wives despite telenovelas being a traditionally feminine genre. The dark, campy tone differed from optimistic and romance-forward telenovelas rosas. It stood in particular contrast to the formulaic productions of Valentín Pimstein, a longtime Televisa producer whose credits included Los ricos también lloran. Pimstein shaped what was then the traditional mold for telenovelas, which Olmos and Téllez rejected with their thriller format. The Miami Herald reported on a new phenomenon for U.S. households in 1987: telenovelas broadcast in the evening. It referred to "the novela hour" as the time after 7pm when families stopped their business to watch shows like Cuna de lobos, drawing a distinction between long-running afternoon soap operas and the short, intense run of evening novelas. The paper credited novelas like Cuna with facilitating discussion of contemporary social issues across cultures.

As the show's popularity grew, Mexican newspaper headlines portrayed the murderous actions of Catalina Creel as if they were real events. Humberto Elizondo recalled being detained by customs officers in Tijuana on the night of the finale in 1987. They wanted to know how the show ended. The finale aired on Friday, June 5, 1987. It registered 64 points on contemporary television ratings, indicating a viewership of 100 million people not including the U.S. According to La Opinión, a Los Angeles newspaper aimed at a Spanish-speaking audience, the streets of Mexico were empty at 9pm while Cuna de lobos was on the air. It re-aired two days later to coincide with that year's soccer finals and attracted more viewers than the soccer match.

María Rubio recalled in an interview with Cristina Saralegui that, while traveling through the Mexican town of Nezahualcóyotl, she saw a blanket with the likeness of Catalina Creel. It urged her to run for president in the election of 1988. The day after the finale, signs read "Vote Catalina Creel for President". A Notimex obituary of Rubio in 2018 highlighted the Catalina Creel for President sign phenomenon and called her "the mother of the all telenovela villains".

Rubio wore her signature eye patch as a spokesperson for Mexicana de Aviación in the 1990s. She was unhappy when she became typecast as a villain, feeling that the public could not separate her Creel persona from the individual. She was unable to find work for five years before she traveled to Puerto Rico to film a miniseries. In their biography of Emilio Azcárraga Jean, Fernández and Paxman speculate that a fight with a Televisa executive may also have hurt her career, citing an interview where Rubio called the end of her time with Televisa a "divorce". Rubio later reunited with co-stars Alejandro Camacho and Rebecca Jones in 1994 for the soap opera Imperio de cristal.

For the fortieth anniversary of Cuna de lobos in 2026, Gala Montes donned an eye patch while presenting the telenovela Corazón de oro The series was rebroadcast on the cable channel TLnovela that year. Rubio herself had parodied her character on the Eugenio Derbez comedy show XHDRBZ in 2002, a segment called "Una de lobos". Reforma reported that the character's eye patch, blonde wig, and trench coat were still being referenced on Spanish-language social media in 2026.

== Analysis ==
The title Cuna de lobos refers to Leonora Navarro. Played by Diana Bracho, the young mother (cuna means cradle or crib in Spanish) wishes to protect her child. The direct female counterpart to Leonora is Vilma, brought to life by Rebecca Jones, whose inability to conceive a child leads to a confrontation where Leonora, as the lone wolf, must confront the other members of the pack. To this more conventional telenovela premise is added the villain of Catalina Creel, who became a sort of antihero to Mexican audiences while the country was in the midst of economic recession. Smith finds that the show "pioneered a hybridity of genre that would become common decades later, fusing the melodrama with the thriller and even elements of comedy", while Meléndez Escalante describes it as "an ironic pastiche of film noir, police procedural, and melodrama".

As the plot unfolds, the driving force is Creel, whose singular devotion to her only son Diana Bracho once described as asexual. This devotion caused her to conceal a healthy eye behind the lie of blindness and commit a series of murders, beginning with that of her own husband. Byron Davies situates her in the grand dramatic tradition of Alexis Carrington from Dynasty and J. R. Ewing from Dallas, noting that her "narcissism is more consistently executed" and her murders are "essential to ... understanding the show’s world as entirely constituted by such patterns".

The show was produced during a period of experimentation while Televisa's leadership was in transition. This sometimes avant garde work has been dubbed the Televisa Spring, when Alemán Velasco had creative license and the Televisa impresario Emilio Azcárraga Jean was busy with other endeavors. Wright calls the result "one of the most emblematic and most viewed Mexican soap operas of all time". Twenty years after the show premiered, the newspaper El Universal said that it had revolutionized telenovelas.

== Remakes ==
The success of Cuna de lobos led to several attempts at a remake. Carlos Olmos reportedly wrote half of the chapters for a new version before he died in 2003. Salvador Mejía, a producer of telenovelas, announced the filming of a pilot called Derecho de sangre in 2010. Danna García was asked to play a role similar to that of Leonora, but with a different name. William Levy, Rafael Amaya, Dominika Paleta, and Rebecca Jones were also among the cast, playing new versions of José Carlos, Alejandro Larios, Vilma Larios, and Catalina Creel respectively. Jones viewed her role as reimagining the character for a thirteen-episode series. This new character, named Deborah Crisan, wore a silver eye patch rather than color-coordinated ones and was intended to be very different from Creel. By October of 2011, Levy was still hoping to secure the rights for what was then called Por derecho de sangre. He would serve as producer alongside Óscar Torres with a planned release date of 2012.

Diana Bracho, who played Leonora in the original Cuna de lobos, was approached to appear in Por derecho de sangre. She felt that the character of Catalina Creel was being sexualized and the producers did not understand the character. Mejía went on to produce an unaired pilot starring Jones and invited Bracho to watch it. She later described her thoughts in an interview: "Terrible." Speculation in 2014 then turned to Daniela Castro of Cañaveral de Pasiones fame to play Creel in a future version.

Paz Vega was cast as Catalina for the 2019 version of Cuna de lobos. Vega told Notimex that her version of the character would be "sexier and more current" In line with Rubio's portrayal, she wore a series of leather eye patches and color-coordinated outfits. The show consisted of 25 episodes rather than the lengthier run time of traditional telenovelas in an effort to update the formula for the streaming era. It aired as the second installment of a programming block Televisa called "Fábrica de sueños, reescribiendo la historia" (Dream Factory, Rewriting [Hi]Story]). Writing in Milenio, Álvaro Cueva compared the new Cuna de lobos to Star Wars: The Force Awakens and similar attempts to bring old media to new audiences. He praised both the 1986 and 2019 iterations for a distinctly Mexican flavor over the more homogenized tendencies of telenovelas intended for cultural export. By contrast, Reforma noted its negative reception in a 2026 retrospective and called the remake forgotten. It debuted in Mexico at the top of its time slot with 5.8 million viewers.

== DVD ==
The first DVD of Cuna de lobos came out in 2002. It was a single-disc DVD that contained the entire telenovela edited down to a little over 230 minutes.

A second DVD release in 2006 spanned three discs. The director of Televisa Home Entertainment explained that the entire show would require thirty discs. The chapters were being edited by experts familiar with the script as part of a project to release two telenovelas or limited run series per month. Along with other telenovelas such as Mundo de Juguete and Rubí, the original instrumental music and soundtrack had been erased and substituted by new music. According to Televisa, record keeping was laxer before the 1990s. Sometimes the rights holder was unknown, or the licensing agreement had not foreseen DVD releases. Following the death of Pedro Plascencia Salinas, producer of the Cuna de lobos soundtrack, his licensing agreements fell to his wife. His mother, the Mexican actress and producer Carmen Salinas, stated, "They weren't going to pay anything for the rights because Televisa owns them. Perhaps they didn't know my daughter-in-law had already granted them."

As of 2020, a year after the remake's debut, that version of the show was unavailable while the original remained in circulation through both the truncated DVD set and episodes posted illicitly on the internet. For Smith this was "further proof of its close connection with Mexican audiences".
