= Julián Robles =

Julián Robles may refer to:

- Julián Robles (footballer)
- Julián Robles (actor)
