= La sonrisa del Diablo =

Mexican telenovela

- Genre: Telenovela; Romance; Drama
- Created by: Luisa Xamar
- Written by: Fernanda Villeli; Marcia Yance; Tere Medina
- Directed by: Arturo Ripstein
- Starring: Rebecca Jones; Ernesto Laguardia; Enrique Álvarez Félix; Jorge Vargas; Gabriela Hassel; Marcela Páez; Blanca Sánchez
- Opening theme: La sonrisa del diablo by Raúl Martell
- Country of origin: Mexico
- Original language: Spanish
- No. of episodes: 115

Production
- Executive producer: Ernesto Alonso
- Cinematography: Jesús Acuña Lee
- Running time: 21-22 minutes (episodes 1-45); 41-44 minutes (episodes 46-115)
- Production company: Televisa

Original release
- Network: El Canal de las Estrellas
- Release: February 24 – July 31, 1992

Related
- La sonrisa del Diablo (1970); Anjo Maldito (1983)

La sonrisa del Diablo (English: The Devil's Smile) is a Mexican telenovela directed by Arturo Ripstein and produced by Ernesto Alonso for Televisa in 1992.

Rebecca Jones starred as antagonistic protagonist, while Ernesto Laguardia, Enrique Álvarez Félix, Jorge Vargas, Gabriela Hassel, Marcela Páez and Blanca Sánchez starred as stellar performances.

== Plot ==
Déborah San Román is an attractive and ambitious young woman who does not distinguish between good and evil and stops at nothing, not even crime, to achieve her goals; She always sows destruction, suicides, moral and economic misery in her wake. The young girl needs male admiration to feel secure in herself, but when she gets bored of her crush, she does not hesitate to break up with him.

Déborah has never loved anyone, but the moment comes when she falls in love with Rafael Galicia, a young man as unscrupulous as her. Rafael is the owner of a famous antique store that he uses as a cover to sell stolen and contraband items with the intention of providing his brother with economic security, medical services and studies, since he is disabled as a result of a traffic accident that he caused.

During one of Rafael's frequent trips to the US border, Deborah meets Salvador Esparza, the man her sister, Laura, has fallen in love with. Salvador is a very rich widower, whom Deborah easily seduces with her charms, but Salvador's children, Beto and Patricia, detest her from the first moment, and even more so when she marries their father, because they sense that she is after their fortune. Laura, devastated by losing Salvador's love, tries to return to her town, but suffers an accident that leaves her amnesiac, and during that stage she enters a world until then unknown to her.

When Rafael returns, Déborah proposes that they have sex again but now in secret, since she has become a married woman. Meanwhile, Salvador will begin to discover Déborah's machinations and deceptions, who will continue to prejudice and betray everyone around her, but her love and honesty will defeat her.

== Cast ==
- Rebecca Jones as Deborah San Román
- Ernesto Laguardia as Rafael Galicia
- Enrique Álvarez Félix as Salvador Esparza
- Jorge Vargas as Carlos Uribe
- Gabriela Hassel as Marilí Uribe
- Marcela Páez as Laura San Román
- Blanca Sánchez as Martha Esparza
- Ramón Abascal as Beto Esparza
- Katia del Río as Patricia Esparza
- Emilia Carranza as Antonia Esparza
- Jaime Garza as Víctor
- Elena Silva as Beatriz Gorozpe
- Gilberto Román as Roberto Hiniestra
- Miguel Ángel Negrete as Federico Espino
- Marco Hernán as Ramón Durán
- Mauricio Bonet as Junior Rodríguez
- Isaura Espinoza as Leonor
- César Castro as Ingeniero Salgado
- Yolanda Ciani as Casandra Adler
- Rosario Gálvez as Lena San Román
- Anel as Perla
- Adriana Parra as Rocío
- Gerardo Hemmer as Genaro Galicia
- Ismael Larumbe as Torritos
- Aurora Cortés as Enedina
- Juan Carlos Serrán as Poncho
- Rosario Zúñiga as Connie
- Alejandro Camacho as Mr. Morelli (special appearance)
