= Fernando Robles (actor) =

Mexican actor

- Occupation: Actor
- Children: Fabián Robles; Julián Robles (actor)

Fernando Robles (born on 15 August 1940 in Portugal) is a Mexican actor known for his roles in the telenovelas.

== Filmography ==
Robles' best known roles are those in the telenovelas Laberintos de pasión, Sin pecado concebido, La otra, Doña Flor y sus dos maridos and Amor dividido.

== Family ==
Robles' children are sons Fabián (born 1974) and Julián.
