= Lágrimas amargas =

1967 Mexican telenovela

- Genre: Telenovela
- Country of origin: Mexico
- Original language: Spanish

Original release
- Network: Telesistema Mexicano
- Release: 1967

Lágrimas amargas is a Mexican telenovela produced by Televisa for Telesistema Mexicano in 1967.

== Cast ==
- Amparo Rivelles - Eva Yocastas
- Ofelia Guilmáin - Carola Baida
- Chela Castro - Bianca Baida
- César del Campo - Aldo Roth
- Jorge Vargas - Marcelo
- Luis Bayardo - Máximo Baida Roth
- Fedora Capdevilla - Lote
- Carlos Bracho - Ernest Monseny
- Tito Junco - Gral. Yocastas
- Sergio Jiménez - Jack
- Chela Nájera - Condesa
- Manolo García - Juliany
- María Rubio
- Jorge Mondragón
- Norma Jiménez Pons
- Wally Barrón
- Fanny Schiller
- Zoila Quiñones
