= Canción de amor =

Telenovela

- Genre: Telenovela; Romance; Drama
- Written by: Oswaldo Dragun
- Directed by: Alfredo Gurrola
- Starring: Eduardo Capetillo; Lorena Rojas; Joaquín Cordero; Nuria Bages; Alonso Echánove; Jaime Garza; Raul Julia-Levy
- Opening theme: Canción de Amor by Eduardo Capetillo
- Country of origin: Mexico
- Original language: Spanish
- No. of episodes: 90

Production
- Executive producer: Luis de Llano Macedo
- Producer: Marco Flavio Cruz
- Production locations: Filming; Televisa San Ángel; Mexico City, Mexico
- Running time: 41–44 minutes
- Production company: Televisa

Original release
- Network: Canal de las Estrellas
- Release: May 13 – September 13, 1996

Related
- Los cien días de Ana (1982)

Canción de amor (English: Love Song) is a Mexican telenovela directed by Alfredo Gurrola and produced by Luis de Llano Macedo for Televisa in 1996. It premiered on Canal de las Estrellas on Monday, May 13, 1996, and ended on Friday, September 13, 1996.

Eduardo Capetillo and Lorena Rojas starred as protagonists.

== Plot ==
Ana's world is upended when she falls deeply in love with Renzo, a charismatic rock singer whose music becomes the soundtrack of her tumultuous journey. Shortly after their fateful meeting, Ana receives a devastating diagnosis of leukemia, forcing her to confront the fragility of life. Yet, instead of surrendering, Ana chooses to live with unyielding passion, marrying Renzo and bringing their daughter into the world—a living testament to their extraordinary love.

Renzo becomes Ana's solace, her antidote against despair, while she is his unwavering pillar of strength, encouraging him to chase his dreams of musical success. Their love, though boundless, is tested as the weight of their responsibilities grows heavier, leading them to a heartbreaking separation. Ana believes that only time, growth, and maturity can mend their fractured bond, but she is painfully aware that time is not on her side.

As her illness advances, Ana engages in a battle against fate, wielding her vitality, beauty, and intelligence as her greatest weapons. In the face of overwhelming odds, she refuses to let her spirit waver, leaving behind a legacy of courage, love, and resilience that will forever shape the lives of those she touches.

== Cast ==
- Eduardo Capetillo as Lorenzo "Renzo"
- Lorena Rojas as Ana
- Joaquín Cordero as Norberto
- Nuria Bages as Nora
- Alonso Echánove as Ernesto #1
- Jaime Garza as Ernesto #2
- Raul Julia-Levy as Marcos Fuentes
- Pedro Weber "Chatanuga" as Elías
- Hugo Acosta as Dr. Ariel
- Leticia Sabater as Valeria
- Zoila Quiñones as Ofelia
- Laureano Brizuela as Álvarez
- Jorge Salinas as Damián
- Mauricio Islas as Edgar
- Aylín Mújica as Estrella
- Abraham Ramos as Adrián
- Mariana Seoane as Roxana
- Marcela Páez as Sylvia
- Javier Herranz as Antonio
- Marcela Pezet as Suzy
- Roberto Blandón as Javier
- Rosa María Bianchi as Alina
- Ana Bertha Espín as Juana
- Mónika Sánchez as Genoveva
- Guillermo García Cantú as Lic. Arizmendi
- Javier Gómez as Rodrigo Pinel
- Sergio Klainer as Diego
- Eduardo Liñán as Marco
- Gerardo Gallardo as Teodoro
- Alejandro Rábago as Genaro
- Óscar Traven as Arturo
- José María Yazpik as Swami
- Arlette Pacheco as Juliana
- David Ramos as Ramiro Flores
- Julio Monterde as José Antonio
- Paola Flores as Pánfila
- Raúl Meraz as Guillermo
- Juan Ignacio Aranda
- Marta Aura
- Amparo Garrido
- Lorenza Hegewish
- Luisa Fernanda
- Renato Bartilotti
- Fernando Sarfatti
- Dulce María
- Yadhira Carrillo
- Claudia Estrada
- Carlos Calderón
- Janina Hidalgo
- Giorgio Palacios
- Osc5ar Bonfiglio
- Claudia Troyo
- Verónica Jaspeado
- Laura Morelos
- Lourdes Aguilar
- Yuvia Cárdenas
- Jesús Lara
- Vicente Herrera
- Jaime Puga
- Raúl Vega
- Arturo Paulet
- Antonio Muñiz
- Aracely Arámbula
