= El alma herida =

- Genre: Telenovela; Romance; Drama
- Created by: Luis Zelkowicz
- Based on: La cruz de papel
- Directed by: Pablo Gómez Sáenz; Moisés Ortiz Urquidi
- Starring: Itati Cantoral; Gabriel Porras; Rebecca Jones
- Opening theme: El alma herida by Itatí Cantoral
- Ending theme: El alma herida by Itatí Cantoral
- Country of origin: United States
- Original language: Spanish
- No. of episodes: 151

Production
- Executive producers: Marcela Mejía; Carlos Payán; Epigmenio Ibarra
- Cinematography: Luis Ávila
- Running time: 42-45 minutes
- Production company: Telemundo

Original release
- Network: Telemundo
- Release: December 15, 2003 – July 26, 2004

El alma herida (English title: The Wounded Soul) is a 2003 Spanish language telenovela produced by the United States–based television network Telemundo Studios, Miami and Mexican Argos Comunicación. The telenovela is a remake of the Puerto Rican 1986 telenovela La cruz de papel. The telenovela aired on Telemundo from December 15, 2003 to July 26, 2004.

Itati Cantoral and Gabriel Porras starred as the protagonists, with Rebecca Jones and Alejandro Camacho starred as the adult protagonists, while Rodrigo de la Rosa starred as the main antagonist.

== Plot ==
A family, full of hope, makes the difficult decision to cross the border into the United States in search of the American dream, leaving everything behind without suspecting that fate will play a trick on them. Eugenia Granados, only eleven years old, her father Salvador Granados and her brother Daniel Salvador cannot cross the border because of police persecution. Her mother Catalina, a beautiful and noble young woman, is taken across the border by a coyote who is attracted to her; the coyote tries to abuse her, and when she resists, he stabs her in the stomach with a knife and leaves her abandoned. A young truck driver, Juan Manuel Mendoza (Gabriel Porras), appears from nowhere and, shocked by the situation, rescues Eugenia, Daniel and Salvador; after a series of trials, Salvador comes to believe that his beloved wife has died.

The pain and suffering of this family leads them to move with Juan Manuel, a shy young worker who becomes the family's main protector and employs Salvador. Eugenia is grateful to Juan Manuel, with whom she falls in love. Meanwhile, Catalina, across the border, keeps trying to find her family despite many difficulties. She earns a living as best she can until a man marries her to give her American citizenship and a small inheritance, which allows him to travel to Pátzcuaro, Michoacán, Mexico.

Meanwhile, Catalina believes that her family lives in the U.S. and decides to return. However, Salvador discovers that his wife is alive, but he believes she left him for another man. When Eugenia discovers that her mother is alive, she decides to look for her, but not before saying goodbye to Juan Manuel with a kiss and telling him she has always wanted him. He is totally confused by this, because she grew up and he never had eyes for anything other than friendship. When in Los Angeles, Eugenia dedicates herself to study and self-improvement. However, her correspondence with Juan Manuel increases his romantic illusions, encouraged by his promise of the future she has long dreamed of. What she does not suspect is that these letters are not from Juan Manuel, but from his younger brother, Alejandro, who takes everything as a simple game without knowing the illusions it creates.

Years later, Eugenia decides to return, just in time to Mexico and meet with Juan Manuel, but his arrival was totally unexpected and bewildering, making the two brothers fight to win her heart. Eugenia Juan Manuel is disappointed and returned to Los Angeles, he will search, and content themselves by Catalina and Eugenia news reunite. Area no opportunity to speak to Catalina the palms, until more and love can come together, but a series of conflicts with inordinate jealousy of Salvador, and the intrigues of a woman Cristina calculator and ambitious, soon separated. Catalina will have to decide between Frank respectful, noble, attractive man and loves her or Savior, the love of his life, who also loves her but has many problems. Eugenia realizes that his half brother Alexander mafioso be a torment in his life; Juan Manuel will leave by a disease which then pound. Eugenia and Catalina will have to make very important decisions to become happy and this mission will be very complicated because of their wounded souls.

== Cast ==
- Itatí Cantoral as Eugenia Granados Morales de Mendoza
- Gabriel Porras as Juan Manuel Mendoza
- Rebecca Jones as Catalina Morales de Granados/vda. de Smith
- Alejandro Camacho as Salvador Granados
- Damián Alcazar as Francisco "Frank" López
- Rodrigo de la Rosa as Alejandro Mendoza
- Marta Aura as Doña Guadalupe Reyes
- Wendy de los Cobos as Cristina
- Gloria Peralta as Adriana
- Dominika Paleta as Patricia Araiza
- Juan Carlos Martín del Campo as Daniel Salvador Granados
- Evangelina Martínez as Gudelia
- Guillermo Quintanilla as Cruz Salazar
- Elizabeth Cervantes as Berta Villegas
- María Aura as Isabel
- Fabian Peña as Guillermo López Rizo
- Fernanda as Clarita
- Amor Huerta as Eugenia Granados (child)
- Adrian Alonso as Daniel Granados (child)
- Evangelina Anderson
- Germán Valdés III as Alejandro Mendoza (young)
- Alex Ubago
- Arturo Ríos as Marcial Mendoza
- Rodolfo Arias as Julián Salazar
