= Amada enemiga =

Mexican telenovela

- Genre: Telenovela; Romance; Drama
- Created by: Inés Rodena
- Written by: Eduardo Quiroga; Lorena Salazar
- Directed by: José Acosta Navas; Sergio Cataño
- Starring: Dominika Paleta; Susana Dosamantes; Enrique Ibáñez; Guillermo Murray; Cecilia Gabriela
- Theme music composer: Ramón Caudet
- Opening theme: Amada enemiga Desesperadamente enamorado (only in United States) by Jordi
- Country of origin: Mexico
- Original language: Spanish
- No. of episodes: 91

Production
- Executive producer: Carlos Sotomayor
- Producer: Rafael Urióstegui
- Production locations: Filming; Televisa San Ángel; Mexico City, Mexico
- Cinematography: Carlos Sánchez Ross; Armando Zafra
- Running time: 41-44 minutes
- Production company: Televisa

Original release
- Network: Canal de las Estrellas
- Release: August 18 – December 5, 1997

Amada enemiga (English: Beloved Enemy) is a Mexican telenovela produced by Carlos Sotomayor for Televisa in 1997. This telenovela based on radionovela Cuando la rival es una hija by Inés Rodena.

On Monday, August 18, 1997, Canal de las Estrellas started broadcasting Amada enemiga weekdays at 7:00pm, replacing Gente bien. The last episode was broadcast on Friday, December 5, 1997 with Mi pequeña traviesa replacing it the following Monday.

Dominika Paleta, Susana Dosamantes and Enrique Ibáñez starred as protagonists, while the leading actor Guillermo Murray starred as main antagonist.

== Synopsis ==
Regina (Susana Dosamantes) is married to a much older man (Guillermo Murray). She leads a sedate life but longs for some passion. On a business trip to Miami, Regina meets Alonso (Enrique Ibañez), a much younger man, and they have a brief but torrid affair. On her return, Regina finds to her horror that Alonso is now working for her husband. To make matters worse, her daughter Jessica (Dominika Paleta) falls for her father's new employee. To save Regina's reputation, Alonso agrees to marry Jessica. The marriage ends up being a sham; however, he falls deeply in love with Jessica. They live a tumultuous romance, lose a baby. Then Regina becomes their surrogate, they get married and live their happy ever after with their child.

== Cast ==
- Dominika Paleta as Jessica Quijano Proal
- Susana Dosamantes as Regina Proal de Quijano
- Enrique Ibáñez as Alonso Velarde
- Guillermo Murray as Esteban Quijano
- Cecilia Gabriela as Cecilia Sandoval
- Hugo Acosta as Héctor
- Eduardo Noriega as Arcadio Lubo
- María Rubio as Reinalda Proal
- Roberto Palazuelos as Mauricio Martinez
- Luis Miguel as Mauricio
- Mauricio Aspe as Jorge Pruneda
- Rocío Sobrado as Rebeca Sandoval
- Teo Tapia as Alejandro
- Lucero Lander as Alicia Benitez
- Kenia Gazcón as Gilda Moreno
- Mariet Rodríguez as Alexandra Pruneda
- Israel Jaitovich as Francisco
- Vanessa Villela as Sara
- Carmen Amezcua as Elena Moreno
- Amara Villafuerte as Felisa
- Fabián Robles as Marcos Benitez
- Zully Keith as Rita de Pruneda
- Irlanda Mora as Fernanda
- Israel Jaitovich as Francisco
- Marco Uriel as Emiliano
- Martha Zamora as Malena
- Carlos Bracho as Abelardo
- Gustavo Negrete
