= Mañana será otro día =

Mexican television series

The title "Manana Sera Otro Dia" (anglicized for the Spanish "Mañana será otro día") is the name of a Mexican telenovela (a limited-run TV soap opera). It began in 1976, with principal actors Jacqueline Andere and Eduardo Fajardo. The title in English means "Tomorrow will be another day", similar to Scarlett O'Hara's famous lines, optimistic of future victory, in the 1939 film Gone with the Wind. In the Spanish title, the accented word "será" ("will be") is pronounced as "say-Rah" but often the word for day is not accented (as "dia").

The telenovela's runtime was 30 minutes, and it had 120 episodes. The TV series was produced in Mexico by Televisa S.A. de C.V. Viewers' reactions to the show have been highly favorable.

== Synopsis of plot storyline ==
Mariana is a young woman from a wealthy family living in the resort town of Puerto Vallarta, Mexico. She loves Arturo, also from a rich family, but their families are long-term enemies. The reason for the families' rivalry is that Mariana's mother Consuelo and his father Juan were once in love, but now have 2 separate families.

Young Mariana becomes pregnant with Arturo's child, but he instead marries another woman, Paola, who dies while giving birth to a girl, Sofía. Mariana leaves her family, while still pregnant, and travels inland to Mexico City, where she gives birth to Arturo's son, Roberto. However, Mariana's new baby is then kidnapped, and she will spend her life looking for him. Thinking of children separated from their mothers, she devotes herself to the care of orphans. Mariana's baby (Roberto) is left to be raised in an orphanage.

One day, Roberto meets Mariana and Sofía (his half-sister, Arturo's daughter). Mariana again meets Arturo, still thinking of her, and he wants to rekindle an affair with her. To regain Mariana's affection, he hires a boy, similar in age to Roberto, to pretend to be Mariana's lost son... However, the deceit will be discovered, and Mariana will find her true son Roberto, but she will remain alone.

== Cast ==
The following are the original cast members of the show:

- Jacqueline Andere .... Mariana
- Eduardo Fajardo .... Alfonso
- Rebeca Iturbide .... Consuelo
- Bertha Moss .... Hortensia
- Víctor Junco .... Juan
- Jorge Vargas .... Arturo
- Veronica Castro .... Gabriela
- Helena Rojo .... Paola
- Nelly Meden .... Patricia
- Ma. Fernanda Ayensa .... Patricia (young)
- María Rubio .... Olivia
- Valentin Trujillo .... Roberto
- Carlos Bracho .... Armando
- Susana Alexander .... Sofia
- Enrique Novi
- Zoila Quiñones
- Marty Cosens
- Rosario Granados .... Virginia

== Crew members ==
Writing credits
- Fernanda Villeli (original story/adaptation)
- Marissa Garido (original story/adaptation)

Cinematography
- Ernesto Alonso

Director
- Carlos David Ortigoza

Producer
- Ernesto Alonso

== See also ==
- "Que Sera, Sera" - song with anglicized title
