= Fabián Robles =

Mexican actor (born 1974)

Fabían Robles
- Born: April 16, 1974 (age 52); León, Guanajuato, Mexico
- Occupation: Actor
- Partner: Nadežda Stanković
- Parent: Fernando Robles (actor)
- Relatives: Julián Robles (actor)

Fabián Robles (born April 16, 1974 in León de los Aldama, Guanajuato, Mexico) is a Mexican actor. Robles began his career in 1994 by participating in the soap opera El vuelo del águila.

== Family and personal ==
Fabián Robles’ father is actor Fernando Robles, and his brother is Julián Robles, who is an actor, writer and director. They appeared together in El vuelo del águila (1994).

== Filmography ==
=== Films ===
Year	Title	Role	Notes
2005	La Troca de Sinaloa	Julián Garza	
2006	Guadalupe	Diego	
2008	Flores Magón	Ricardo Flores Magón	Short film
2009	Catarsis	Young Actor	Short film
2015	Juan y Vanesa	Juan	Post-production

=== Television ===
Year	Title	Role	Notes
1994	El vuelo del águila	Young Porfirio Díaz	
1995	Bajo un mismo rostro (TV series)	Teo	73 episodes
1995	Lazos de amor	Geno	
1996	Te sigo amando	Óscar	
1997	Amada enemiga	Marcos	
1997	Sin ti	Unknown role	
1997	Mi pequeña traviesa	Martín	
1999	Tres mujeres	Ángel Romero	
2000	Primer amor, a mil por hora	Santiago García "La Iguana"	
2001	Mujer, casos de la vida real	Unknown role	"Callejera" (Season 18, Episode 39)
2001	Primer amor, tres años después	Santiago García "La Iguana"	Television film
2002	Entre el amor y el odio	José Alfredo Moreno	
2002-2003	Clase 406	Giovanni Ferrer Escudero	
2004	Amy, la niña de la mochila azul	Bruno Cervantes	
2004	Apuesta por un amor	Álvaro Montaño	
2005	Contra viento y marea	Jerónimo	
2005	Vecinos	Charro Negro	"Mejor no celebremos México" (Season 1, Episode 11)
2006	La verdad oculta	Roberto Zárate	
2007	Muchachitas como tú	Federico Cantú	
2007-2008	Al diablo con los guapos	Rigoberto	
2008-2009	Mañana es para siempre	Vladimir Piñeiro	80 episodes
2009	Hermanos y detectives	Unknown role	"Tiempos difíciles" (Season 1, Episode 10)
2010	Soy tu dueña	Felipe Santibáñez	Supporting role
2010	Mujeres asesinas	Pitayo	"Las Cotuchas, Empresarias" (Season 3, Episode 14)
2011	El Equipo	Mateo Acona	15 episodes
2011-2012	La que no podía amar	Efraín Ríos	Supporting role
2012	Como dice el dicho	José	"El más amigo es traidor" (Season 2, Episode 67)
2013	Mentir para vivir	Piero Verástegui	Supporting role
2014	La malquerida	Braulio Jimenez "El Rubio"	Supporting role
2015	Que te perdone Dios	Julio Acosta / Julián Acosta Montero	Supporting role
2016	Estudio en la Calle St. Jude	Octavio	Pre-production
2017	En tierras salvajes	Víctor Tinoco	Supporting role
2018	Por amar sin ley	Sr. Pérez	Guest role
2018	Y mañana será otro día	Adrián Sarmiento	Supporting role
2022	Amor dividido	Kevin Hernández	Supporting role
2022	Mi camino es amarte	Aarón Peláez	
2026	El renacer de Luna	Jacobo "Boco" Conrado Cadena Montoya	

== Awards and nominations ==
=== TVyNovelas Awards ===
Year	Category	Telenovela	Result
1995	Best Male Revelation	El vuelo del águila	Nominated
2001	Best Co-star Actor	Primer amor... a mil por hora	Nominated
2005	Best Male Antagonist	Apuesta por un amor	Won
2008	Best Male Antagonist	Muchachitas como tú	Nominated
2014	Best Supporting Actor	La Malquerida	Nominated
