= Laberintos de pasión =

Mexican telenovela

- Genre: Telenovela
- Created by: Caridad Bravo Adams
- Written by: Cuauhtémoc Blanco; María del Carmen Peña
- Directed by: Claudio Reyes Rubio
- Starring: Leticia Calderón; Francisco Gattorno; César Évora; Manuel Ojeda; Mónika Sánchez; Pedro Armendáriz; Alma Delfina; Azela Robinson; Aarón Hernán; Abraham Ramos; María Rubio
- Opening theme: "Laberintos de pasión" by Pedro Fernández
- Composer: Jorge Avendaño
- Country of origin: Mexico
- Original language: Spanish
- No. of episodes: 80

Production
- Executive producer: Ernesto Alonso
- Producer: Luis Miguel Barona
- Production locations: Televisa San Ángel; Mexico City, Mexico; San Vicente, Mexico
- Cinematography: Juan Carlos Frutos; Víctor Soto
- Camera setup: Multi-camera
- Running time: 41–44 minutes
- Production company: Televisa

Original release
- Network: Canal de las Estrellas
- Release: October 4, 1999 – January 21, 2000

Laberintos de pasión (English: Labyrinths of Passion) is a Mexican telenovela produced by Ernesto Alonso for Televisa in 1999-2000. It aired on Canal de Las Estrellas from October 4, 1999 to January 21, 2000, weeknights at 8:00pm.

From Monday, August 21, 2000, to Tuesday, December 12, 2000, it aired in the United States weeknights at 9/8c on Univision.

Leticia Calderón, Francisco Gattorno, César Évora, Manuel Ojeda, Mónika Sánchez, Pedro Armendáriz, Alma Delfina, Azela Robinson, Aarón Hernán, Abraham Ramos and María Rubio starred in this telenovela.

== Plot ==
When they were children, Julieta (Leticia Calderón) and the brothers Pedro (Francisco Gattorno) and Cristóbal Valencia (Abraham Ramos) were friends, but Genaro (Manuel Ojeda), owner of "El Castillo" and the boys' father, pulled them apart. The painter Gabriel Almada (César Évora) takes care of little Julieta when her grandfather dies.

They leave the region and over the years she becomes a brilliant doctor. Moved by nostalgia, she decides to return to San Vicente, her hometown, and practice her profession there.

Gabriel accompanies her, but their return revives passions from the past. Genaro's hatred towards Gabriel is reborn, because he always knew that the painter was the true love of his wife, Sofía (Alma Delfina). This hatred is shared by Pedro, who once saw Gabriel kissing his mother.

Genaro brings his niece, Nadia (Mónika Sánchez), to "El Castillo" with the idea of solving his financial problems through the fortune that the young woman has inherited. On her side, Julieta discovers that her childhood friendship with Pedro has turned into a mature and well-requited love. But they are separated by Nadia, who has set her sights on him. Julieta, alone and hurt, takes refuge in Gabriel, but he has fallen in love with her.

Julieta finds herself between two conflicting emotions: her strong passion for Pedro and the peaceful and secure love that Gabriel offers her. Now, Julieta must choose between two loves.

== Cast ==
=== Main cast ===
- Leticia Calderón as Julieta
- Francisco Gattorno as Pedro
- César Évora as Gabriel
- Manuel Ojeda as Genaro
- Mónika Sánchez as Nadia
- Pedro Armendáriz as Father Mateo
- Alma Delfina as Sofía
- Azela Robinson as Carmina
- Aarón Hernán as Lauro
- Abraham Ramos as Cristóbal
- María Rubio as Ofelia

=== Supporting cast ===
- Eugenio Cobo as Arturo
- Tiaré Scanda as Rocío
- Socorro Bonilla as Matilde
- Silvia Manríquez as Sara
- Roberto Antúnez as Miguel
- Fernando Robles as Rosendo
- Héctor Sáez as Juan

=== Guest star ===
- Luz María Jerez as Marissa

== Awards and nominations ==
Year	Award	Category	Nominee(s)	Result
2000	TVyNovelas Awards	Best Telenovela	Ernesto Alonso	Won
2000	TVyNovelas Awards	Best Actress	Leticia Calderón	Won
2000	TVyNovelas Awards	Best Actor	César Évora	Nominated
2000	TVyNovelas Awards	Best Antagonist Actress	Mónika Sánchez	Won
2000	TVyNovelas Awards	Best Antagonist Actor	Manuel Ojeda	Won
2000	TVyNovelas Awards	Best Leading Actress	María Rubio	Nominated
2000	TVyNovelas Awards	Best Leading Actor	Aarón Hernán	Nominated
2000	TVyNovelas Awards	Best Young Lead Actress	Tiaré Scanda	Nominated
2000	TVyNovelas Awards	Best Young Lead Actor	Abraham Ramos	Nominated
2000	TVyNovelas Awards	Best Musical Theme	"Laberintos de pasión" by Pedro Fernández	Won
2000	TVyNovelas Awards	Best Musical Theme Composer	Jorge Avendaño	Won
2000	TVyNovelas Awards	Best Original Story or Adaptation	Cuauhtémoc Blanco; María del Carmen Peña	Won
2000	Bravo Awards	Best Actor	César Évora	Won
2000	Palmas de Oro Awards	Best Antagonist Actress	Azela Robinson	Won
2001	Latin ACE Awards	Best Actor	Francisco Gattorno	Won
2001	Latin ACE Awards	Best Co-lead Actor	Abraham Ramos	Won
