= Me llaman Martina Sola =

Mexican telenovela

- Genre: Telenovela
- Created by: Carlos Lozano Dana
- Directed by: Arturo Salgado
- Starring: Joaquín Cordero; Chela Castro
- Country of origin: Mexico
- Original language: Spanish

Production
- Executive producer: Raúl Astor
- Cinematography: Carlos Lozano Dana

Original release
- Network: Televisión Independiente de México
- Release: 1972

Me llaman Martina Sola is a Mexican telenovela produced by Raúl Astor for Televisión Independiente de México in 1972.

== Cast ==
- Joaquín Cordero - Rafael Corvalán
- Chela Castro - Martina Durán
- Claudia Islas - Irene
- José Luis Jiménez - Joaquín Durán
- María Rubio - Emma Solorio
- Guillermo Aguilar
- Lupe Andrade
- Héctor Andremar - Julio
- Mario Casillas
- Armando de Pascual
- María Eugenia Ríos
- Otto Sirgo
- Pedro Damián
- Pedro Armendáriz Jr. - Jaime Corvalán
