= Huracán (TV series) =

- Genre: Telenovela; Romance; Drama
- Written by: Orlando Merino; Jaime García Estrada
- Directed by: Salvador Sánchez; Alejandro Camacho
- Starring: Angélica Rivera; Eduardo Palomo; Alexis Ayala; Silvia Pasquel
- Theme music composer: Osni Casab
- Opening theme: Instrumental
- Country of origin: Mexico
- Original language: Spanish
- No. of episodes: 120

Production
- Executive producers: Rebecca Jones; Alejandro Camacho
- Production locations: Filming; Televisa San Ángel; Mexico City, Mexico; Locations; Mazatlán, Mexico; Mexico City, Mexico; Los Cabos, Mexico
- Running time: 41-44 minutes
- Production company: Televisa

Original release
- Network: Canal de las Estrellas
- Release: October 13, 1997 – March 27, 1998

Huracán (English: Hurricane) is a Mexican telenovela produced by Rebecca Jones and Alejandro Camacho for Televisa in 1997.

On Monday, October 13, 1997, Canal de las Estrellas started broadcasting Huracán weekdays at 10:00pm, replacing El alma no tiene color. The last episode was broadcast on Friday, March 27, 1998 with La usurpadora replacing it the following Monday.

Angélica Rivera and Eduardo Palomo starred as protagonists, while Alexis Ayala, Maya Mishalska and the leading actor Jorge Russek starred as antagonists.

== Plot ==
The story takes place in Mazatlán. Helena Robles is the illegitimate daughter of Alfonsina Robles and Fernan Vargaslugo, a rich man who, under the influence of his mother and sister, never had strength to recognize Helena as his daughter.

He married another woman and adopted a daughter, Larissa. Helena falls in love with Ulises Medina, a poor boy whose best friend is Raimundo Villareal, son of the impresario Nestor Villareal, the owner of the Nautilus companies. Nestor had intimate relations with the mother of Ulises when they were young, but he deceived her and now she hates all the Villareal family.

Ulises and Helena decide to escape together but their plan doesn't work and Ulises leaves alone, pursued by the police, because he robbed a ring from the true Helena's grandmother to give it to her as a present. Shortly after Helena leaves for Mexico. Nine years later Helena has become a famous biologist and Ulises is a sailor.

By chance they both return to Mazatlán at the same time, meet each other again and realize that their love is still alive. They start seeing each other again, but Raimundo and his sister Thelma are jealous because they are in love with Helena and Ulises. They try to separate the couple.

== Cast ==
- Angélica Rivera as Helena Robles
- Eduardo Palomo as Ulises Medina
- Alexis Ayala as Raymundo Villarreal
- Maya Mishalska as Thelma Villarreal de Vargaslugo
- Jorge Russek as Don Néstor Villarreal
- Alejandra Barros as Rocío Medina
- Alex Ibarra as Santiago Villarreal
- Eric del Castillo as Fernán Vargaslugo
- Beatriz Aguirre as Doña Irasema Vargaslugo
- Adriana Roel as Esperanza Ibarrola de Villarreal
- Luis Couturier as Guillermo Medina
- Sylvia Pasquel as Caridad Salvatierra de Medina
- Aarón Hernán as Don Leonardo Robles
- Norma Herrera as Alfonsina Taviani de Robles
- Pilar Pellicer as Ada Vargaslugo
- Ivette Proal as Larissa Vargaslugo
- Héctor Cruz Lara as Lobato Ramírez Villarreal
- Fernando Balzaretti as Ezequiel Vargaslugo
- Ludwika Paleta as Norma Vargaslugo
- Oscar Uriel as Eugenio Vargaslugo
- Marcela Páez as Maribel Solares de Medina
- Jesús Arriaga as Damián Medina
- Oscar Morelli as Don Mariano Medina
- Alejandra Procuna as Deyanira
- Gabriela Platas as Karina Robles
- Roberto D'Amico as José Jorge García
- Virginia Gutiérrez as Mother Brígida Ibarrola
- Sherlyn as Daniela Vargaslugo Villarreal
- Oscar Servin as Father Elías
- Alejandra Morales as Cynthia
- Manuel Benítez as Comandante Gregorio Quijano
- Esteban Franco as Jacinto
- Ignacio Guadalupe as Conrado
- Jorge Pais as Dr. Álvaro Carrasco
- Dulce María as Rocío Medina (child)
- Eric Sánchez as Eugenio Vargaslugo (child)
- Daniel Habif as Santiago Villarreal (child)
- Alfredo Alfonso as Dr. Mario Luna
- Elena Ballesteros as Ramona
- Graciela Bernardos as Milagros
- Luis Bernardos as Artemio Hernández
- Guadalupe Bolaños as Mother Carmela
- Ernesto Bretón as Eligio
- Zayda Castellón as Dora López
- Javier Chimaldi as Lino
- Constantino Costas as Walter Pereira
- Georgina del Rincón as Socorro
- Sheryl Mackay as Dolores
- Luis Guillermo Martell as Pepe
- Adán Martínez Cosain as Héctor
- Sara Montes as Ifigenia
- Rubén Morales as Froilán
- Fernando Morín as Narciso
- Gustavo Negrete as Lic. Félix
- Lisette Sáez as Ana
- Rocío Yaber as Inmaculada
- Rodolfo Jiménez as Ricardo

== Awards and nominations ==
Year	Award	Category	Nominee	Result
1998	16th TVyNovelas Awards	Best Leading Actor	Jorge Russek	Won
1998	16th TVyNovelas Awards	Best Young Lead Actress	Ludwika Paleta	Nominated
1998	El Heraldo de México Awards	Best Actress	Angélica Rivera	Nominated
1998	Diosa de Plata	Best Supporting Actress	Maya Mishalska	Won
