= Supermax (Spanish TV series) =

Spanish television series

- Genre: Drama
- Written by: Daniel Burman; María Paz León; Virginia Martínez; Marcos Osorio Vidal; Mario Segade
- Directed by: Daniel Burman; Hernán Goldfrid; Bruno Hernandez
- Starring: Santiago Segura; Cecilia Roth; Rubén Cortada
- Country of origin: Various
- Original language: Spanish
- No. of seasons: 1
- No. of episodes: 10

Production
- Production companies: Mediaset España Comunicación; Central Globo de Produção; Televisión Azteca; Televisión Pública Argentina; Teledoce

Original release
- Network: HBO Spain

Supermax is a television series created and directed by Daniel Burman and co-produced by Mediaset España Comunicación, Central Globo de Produção, Televisión Azteca, Teledoce, and Televisión Pública Argentina. The series follows the story of eight characters who purge their guilty for criminal acts they have committed in the past in a reality show recorded in an abandoned high security prison, where years before there was a big slaughter. It stars Santiago Segura, Cecilia Roth and Rubén Cortada.

The series premiered on September 15, 2017 on HBO Spain, later to be released on October 5, 2017 on Televisión Azteca.

== Plot summary ==
The series revolves around a maximum security prison that was the epicenter of a bloodshed in the 1990s, which caused its closure. Twenty years later, a producer decides to rent the space to produce an extreme reality show where eight eccentric people who are at a crossroads in their ordinary lives are chosen to play a game and find a way out.

== Cast ==
- Santiago Segura as Orlando Saslavsky
- Cecilia Roth as Pamela Dalmasso
- Rubén Cortada as Mercurio Salgado
- Alejandro Camacho as El Ingeniero
- Antonio Birabent as Sandro Tifón
- Lucas Ferraro as Martín
- Juan Pablo Geretto as Muriel Santa Lucía
- Nicolás Gold as Augusto
- Felipe Hintze as Damián
- Alexia Moyano as Anette Gijon
- Laura Neiva as Sunny Days
- Laura Novoa as Lorna
- Guillermo Pfening as Rex Pardo
- César Troncoso as Cholo Bernaza
