= Te amo (TV series) =

- Genre: Telenovela; Drama
- Created by: Jorge Lozano
- Written by: Oscar Lada Abot
- Directed by: Enrique Segoviano
- Starring: Lourdes Munguía; José Roberto; Aarón Hernán; María Rubio; Norma Lazareno; Porfirio Baz
- Country of origin: Mexico
- Original language: Spanish
- No. of episodes: 125

Production
- Executive producer: Guillermo Diazayas
- Cinematography: Enrique Segoviano
- Running time: 30 minutes
- Production company: Televisa

Original release
- Network: Canal de las Estrellas
- Release: 1984

Te amo (English title:I love you) is a Mexican telenovela produced by Guillermo Diazayas and directed by Enrique Segoviano for Televisa in 1984. It starred Lourdes Munguía, José Roberto, Aarón Hernán, María Rubio and Norma Lazareno.

== Cast ==
- Lourdes Munguía as Verónica
- José Roberto as Fernando
- Aarón Hernán as Matías
- María Rubio as Consuelo
- Norma Lazareno as Victoria
- Porfirio Baz as Esteban
- Beatriz Martínez as Regina
- Marta Aura as Mercedes
- Felipe Gil as Bernardo
- Adalberto Menéndez as Carlos
- Júlio Augurio as Cristóbal
- Dolores Beristáin as Aída
- Ricardo de León as Gabriel
- Marisa De Lille as Susana
- Elizabeth Dupeyrón
- Sonia Esquivel as Gladys
- Alberto Gavira as Castillo
- Kokin Li as El Chale
- Julio Monterde as Humberto
- Morenita as Gloria
- Elsie Méndez as Lucila
- Mercedes Navarro as Leticia
- Mercedes Olea as Julia
- Patricia Renteria as Magda
- Carmen Rodríguez de la Vega as Patricia
- Nallely Saldivar as Claudia
- Luz Elena Silva as María Elena
- Alejandra Ávalos as Cecilia
