= Israel Jaitovich =

- Born: Israel Jaitovich Cortés; 12 August 1969 (age 57); Tijuana, BC, Mexico

NASCAR Mexico Series career
- 61 races run over 8 years
- Car no., team: No. 01 (Israel Jaitovich)
- 2015 position: 23rd
- Best finish: 23rd (2015)
- First race: 2008 Puebla 150 (Puebla)
- Last race: 2015 RedCo 240 (Chiapas)
Wins	Top tens	Poles
0	1	0

Israel Jaitovich Cortés (born 12 August 1969 in Mexico City) is a Premios TVyNovelas award-winning Mexican actor, producer, writer and racing car driver. He produced and co-hosted the Televisa variety series Desmadruga2.

Jaitovich began his acting career in 1991, in the role of Nicolas on the telenovela Capricho, and has appeared on further Televisa programs, some of which have aired on Univision in the United States. His other Televisa appearances, mostly on the Canal de las Estrellas, were in Amada Enemiga, La Mentira, Infierno en el Paraiso, and Otro Rollo.

In 2003 he was given his own television series, El Bano, his debut as a producer. Desmadruga2, his most notable television, series premiered in 2007. This series received a Premios TVyNovelas award for Best Entertainment Program and has continues to broadcast on the Canal de Las Estrellas in Mexico and Univision in the U.S.

Jaitovich is also a racing car driver, and currently drives the No. 01 car in the NASCAR Mexico Series. Previously he raced in the Mexican Formula Three, and was a motorcycling racing champion. He is also involved in charitable events.

Jaitovich currently resides in Mexico City.
