= El ángel caído (TV series) =

- Genre: Telenovela; Drama
- Created by: María Guadalupe Arias Aranda
- Written by: Claudio Reyes Rubio
- Directed by: Manolo García
- Starring: Rebecca Jones; Alejandro Camacho; Eduardo Palomo; Cristina Peñalver; Lorenzo de Rodas; Enrique Rocha
- Country of origin: Mexico
- Original language: Spanish
- No. of episodes: 125

Production
- Executive producer: Francisco Burillo
- Production locations: San Luis Potosí, Mexico
- Production company: Televisa

Original release
- Network: Canal de las Estrellas
- Release: October 1, 1985 – March 24, 1986

Related
- La otra cara del alma (2012)

El ángel caído (English title:The fallen angel) is a Mexican telenovela produced by Francisco Burillo for Televisa in 1985.

Rebecca Jones starred as antagonistic protagonist, with Alejandro Camacho and Eduardo Palomo.

== Plot ==
María de los Ángeles Bustamante is known to all her people. The image that people have of her is of a good and honest woman. However, María de los Ángeles is actually a bitter person, capable of destroying anyone to get enough money to support herself. María de los Ángeles marries a man who inherits, and she kills him on their wedding night, then collects the inheritance.

After this act, María de los Ángeles looking to get more money, and so begins with plans to murder his uncle, who's named in his will as one of the heirs of his fortune. However, that heritage should also share with Toño, his cousin. That's when María de los Ángeles begins to make his life miserable, until finally one day decides to escape Toño and María de los Ángeles leaves town.

Toño comes to work at companies Roberto Florescano, and there falls in love Avelina, but she is committed to Roberto Florescano. Toño Avelina's daughter discovers that his uncle, and that she would inherit part of their heritage. Toño returns to town with Roberto and Avelina. Roberto falls in love with María de los Ángeles, while the other two try to discover the real María de los Ángeles.

== Cast ==
- Rebecca Jones as María de los Ángeles Bustamante
- Alejandro Camacho as Roberto Florescano
- Eduardo Palomo as Antonio "Toño" Arvide Quijano
- Cristina Peñalver as Avelina Galá
- Lorenzo de Rodas as Manuel Alfonso "El Gallo" Maldonado
- Enrique Rocha as Álvaro
- Fernando Ciangherotti as Ramón Florescano
- Aurora Alonso as Felicitas Nava
- Maritza Olivares as Remedios Nava
- Carlos Andrade as Víctor Manuel Márquez
- Blanca Torres as Doña Victoria Estévez de Quijano
- Nerina Ferrer as Nieves Galá
- Betty Catania as Elvira Márquez
- Jaime Lozano as Father Rosales
- Claudio Reyes Rubio as Patricio
- Ricardo de León as Demetrio
- Ángeles Marín as Anita
- Paty Thomas as Mercedes
- Marcela Camacho as Lucía
- Carlos Romano as Javier
- Víctor Vera as Lic. Macías
- Estela Barona as Rosalba
- Blanca Córdoba as Bertha
- Luis Couturier as Octavio Barrera/Agustín Arvide
- Ricardo De Loera as Sr. Castillo
- Luisa Huertas as Lic. Medina
- Leticia Calderón
- Daniel Martín
- Claudia Ramírez
- Manola Saavedra

== Awards ==
Year	Award	Category	Nominee	Result
1986	4th TVyNovelas Awards	Best Antagonist Actress	Rebecca Jones	Won
1986	4th TVyNovelas Awards	Best Young Lead Actor	Eduardo Palomo	Nominated
1986	4th TVyNovelas Awards	Best Female Revelation	Cristina Peñalver	Nominated
1986	4th TVyNovelas Awards	Best Male Revelation	Claudio Reyes Rubio	Nominated
