= La sonrisa del Diablo (1970 TV series) =

- Genre: Telenovela
- Country of origin: Mexico
- Original language: Spanish

Original release
- Network: Telesistema Mexicano
- Release: 1970

Related
- La sonrisa del Diablo

La sonrisa del Diablo is a Mexican telenovela produced by Televisa and transmitted by Telesistema Mexicano in 1970.

== Cast ==
- Maricruz Olivier as Deborah
- Narciso Busquets as Salvador
- Norma Herrera
- Andrés García
- Rosenda Monteros
- Fanny Schiller
- Jorge Vargas
