= Abraham Ramos =

Mexican actor

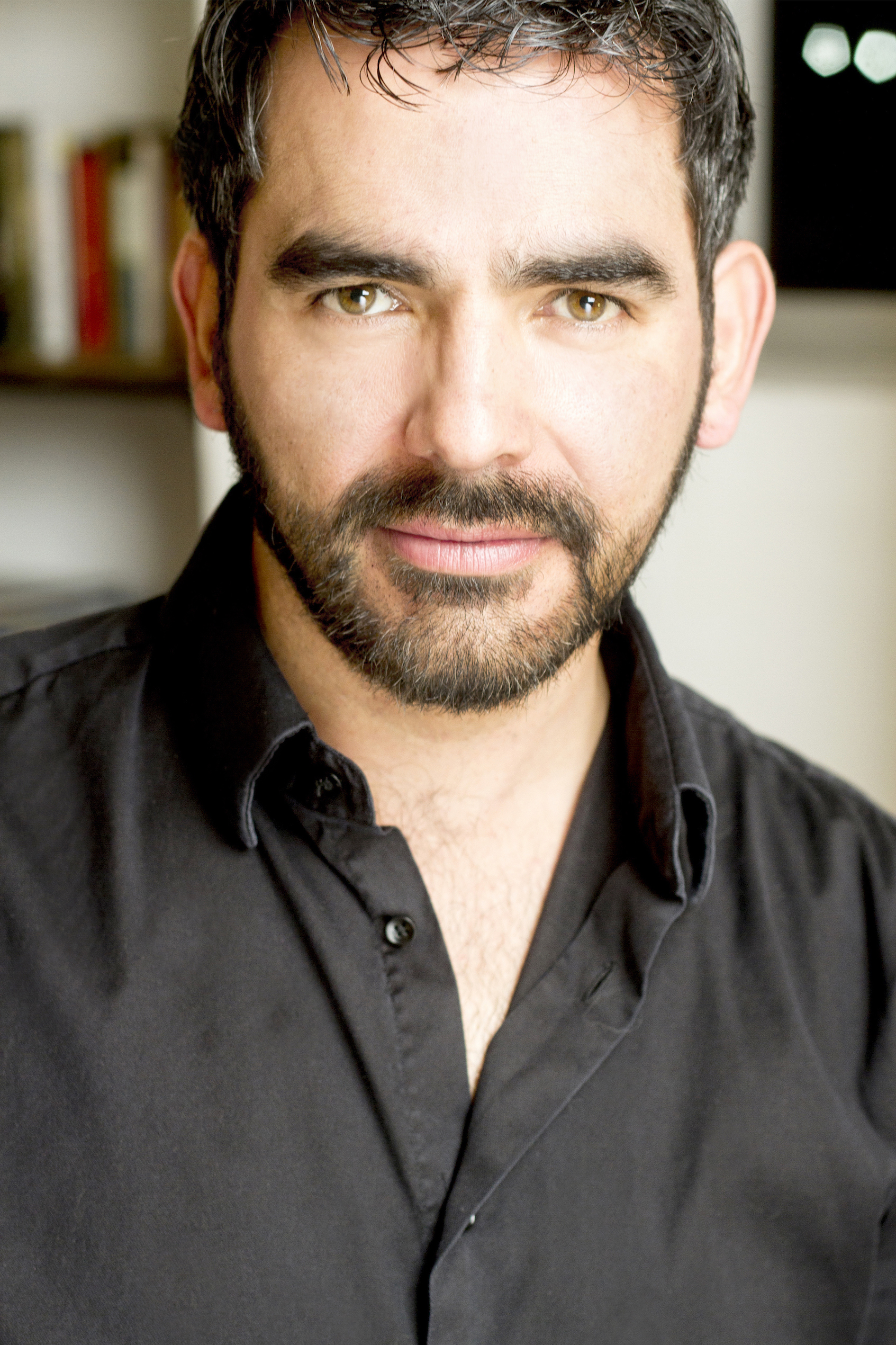
- Abraham Ramos
- Born: Abraham Ramos; 13 February 1974 (age 51); Mexico City
- Occupation: Actor

Abraham Ramos (born 13 February 1974 in Mexico City) is a Mexican actor who has appeared in many telenovelas and television series.

== Career ==
Abraham is the youngest of the four siblings. His first role was in Retrato de familia, a telenovela of Lucy Orozco, in 1995, together with Helena Rojo and Alfredo Adame. In 1995 he also acted in La paloma. Other telenovelas in which he has acted are: Canción de amor, Mi querida Isabel, María Isabel, Sin ti, Camila, Laberintos de pasión amongst others.

In 2002 he played the role of Enrique Mendoza in the telenovela Las vias del amor. His character was obsessed with Perla (Aracely Arambula) and went so far as to kill his father on their wedding night out of jealousy, but it was revealed in the ending of the telenovela that she was in fact his cousin.

In 2004 he played Efraín in the telenovela Inocente de ti together with Helena Rojo and Carolina Tejera.

In January 2012, Ramos confirmed that he was in a relationship with Olivia Collins, whom he had acted with in the series Dos hogares.

== Telenovelas ==
- Por amar sin ley (2018)....Abogado Ornelas
- Quiero amarte (2013/2014)....David Serrano
- Dos hogares (2011)....Claudio Ballesteros
- Cuidado con el ángel (2008)-(2009)....Adrián Gonzáles
- Al diablo con los guapos (2007)....Sergio
- Bajo las riendas del amor (2007)....Sebastián Corcuera
- Peregrina (2005)....Iván
- Inocente de ti (2004–2005)....Efraín
- Las vías del amor (2002)....Enrique
- Mujer bonita (2001)....Orlando
- Siempre te amaré (2000)....Leonardo Reyes
- Laberintos de pasión (1999–2000)....Cristóbal Valencia
- Camila (1998–1999)....Pablo
- Sin ti (1997–1998)....
- Maria Isabel (1997–1998)....Ramón
- Mi querida Isabel (1996–1997)....Rolando
- Canción de amor (1996)....Adrián
- Retrato de familia (1995–1996)....Jaime

== Television series ==
- Sin miedo a la verdad (2018-2019)...Ramón
- Como dice el dicho (2011–2015) 6 episodes
- Tiempo final (Fox) (2009) Capítulo "El Clown"
- Mujeres asesinas (2008)....Julián Castaño
- Mujer casos de la vida real 16 episodes (1995–2006)

== Movies ==
- La última llamada (1996).... Mario Cortés (age 20)
- Como tú me has deseado (2005)....Aníbal Soler
