= Rebecca Jones (Mexican actress) =

Mexican actress (1957–2023)

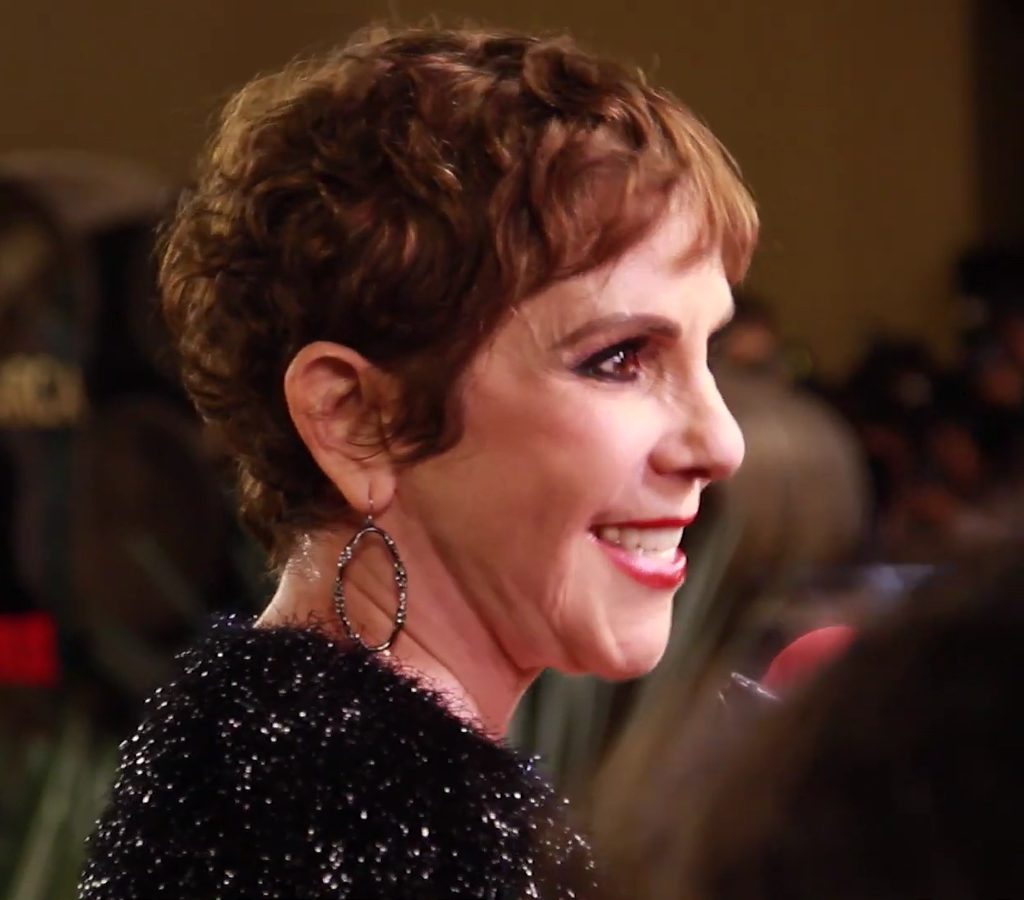
- Born: Rebecca Jones Fuentes Berain; May 21, 1957; Mexico City, Mexico
- Died: March 22, 2023 (aged 65); Laguna Beach, California
- Occupation: Actress
- Years active: 1982–2023
- Spouse: Alejandro Camacho (m. 1986; div. 2011)
- Children: Maximiliano Camacho Jones

Rebecca Jones Fuentes Berain (May 21, 1957 – March 22, 2023) was a Mexican actress. She was married for 25 years to actor Alejandro Camacho with whom she worked sharing credits in many telenovelas such as: El ángel caído, Cuna de lobos, Imperio de Cristal, Para volver a amar and Que te perdone Dios. Together they had a son named Maximiliano Camacho Jones.

== Life and career ==
Jones was the daughter of an American father and Mexican mother. Her family moved to California when she was young. Jones attended Laguna Beach High School, Saddleback College, and University of Southern California, and studied at the South Coast Actors Corporation. Her education included courses related to acting, literary analysis, scenography, lighting, and make-up.

In 1981, after working as a waitress, she returned to Mexico, and two years later she made her debut as an actress in El coleccionista (1983). She received several awards for her performance, including Revelation of the Year by the Union of Critics and Theatrical Chronicles.

In theater, she performed in La visita de la bestia, Pelearán a 10 rounds, Víctimas del amor, La declaración, Casémonos juntos, El sexo opuesto, Drácula, Cómo aprendí a manejar, and Rosa de dos aromas.

Jones died from ovarian cancer on March 22, 2023, at the age of 65.

== Filmography ==
=== Films ===
Year	Title	Role	Notes
1984	Gringo mojado	Lupita Blanco	Debut film
1986	Vacaciones separadas	Girl #2 at Pool	Uncredited
1989	Polvo de luz	Esposa del cineasta	
1994	Guerrero Negro		
1994	Amorosos fantasmas	Muchacha cola de caballo	
1994	Días de combate	Muchacha cola de caballo	
2003	El misterio del Trinidad	Isabel Aguirre	
2006	Alta infidelidad	Roxana	
2008	I'm Gonna Explode	Eva	
2012	La Cama	Emilia	
2013	The Last Call	Amanda	Nominated — Ariel Award for Best Supporting Actress

=== Television ===
Year	Title	Role	Notes
1982	El amor nunca muere	Mary Ann	Telenovela
1983–1984	El maleficio	Ruth Reyna	Telenovela, supporting role
1984	Opération O.P.E.N.	Virginia	1 episode: "Le secret d'Armadillo" (Season 1, Episode 4)
1984–1985	La traición	Georgina	Telenovela, supporting role
1985	Angélica	Silvia	Telenovela
1985	El ángel caído	María de los Ángeles Bustamante	Telenovela
1986–1987	Cuna de lobos	Vilma De la Fuente de Larios	Telenovela
1988	Dos vidas	Teresa	Telenovela, protagonist
1992	La sonrisa del Diablo	Déborah San Román	Telenovela
1994–1995	Imperio de cristal	Sofía Vidal	Telenovela, protagonist
1999	Buenas noches	Herself	TV-Series
1999–2000	La vida en el espejo	Isabel Franco	Telenovela, protagonist
2001	Lo que callamos las mujeres	Adriana	1 episode: "Doble jornada" (Season 1, Episode 70)
2002–2003	El país de las mujeres	Bernarda	Telenovela, protagonist
2003–2004	El alma herida	Catalina Morales	Telenovela, protagonist
2004	Passions	Lola	TV-Series, 5 episodes
2007	Jennifer López Presents: Como ama una mujer	Bárbara	TV mini-series
2010	Grandes finales de telenovelas	Vilma Gaxiola de Larios	TV documentary, archive footage
2010–2011	Para volver a amar	Antonia Palacios	Telenovela, protagonist
2013	Mojoe	Herself	TV-Series, 1 episode
2013	Pasión prohibida	Flavia Santillana	Telenovela
2014	Sr. Ávila	Dra. Mola	TV-Series, 9 episodes
2014–2015	Señora Acero	Enriqueta Sabido	Telenovela
2015	Que te perdone Dios	Renata	Telenovela, protagonist
2016–2017	La Doña	Yesenia Sandoval Ramos	Telenovela
2017–2018	Las Malcriadas	Catalina Basurto	Main role
2019	Doña Flor y sus dos maridos	Margarita Canul	Main role
2020	La Casa de las Flores	Victoria Aguirre	Main role
2021	¿Te acuerdas de mí?	Antonia Solís	Main role
2022	Cabo	Lucía	Main role
2023	‘’Nada Que Ver ‘’	Carolina	Supporting Role

=== As writer and producer ===
Year	Title	Notes
1993	¡Aquí espaantan!	Producer
1994	El tesoro de Clotilde	Producer
1994	Guerrero Negro	Producer
1998	Huracán	Writer/producer

== Awards and nominations ==
Year	Award	Category	Telenovela	Result
1986	TVyNovelas Awards	Best Female Antagonist	El ángel caído	Won
1993	TVyNovelas Awards	Best Female Antagonist	La sonrisa del Diablo	Nominated
1995	TVyNovelas Awards	Best Lead Actress	Imperio de Cristal	Won
1995	Premios El Heraldo de México	Best Actress	Imperio de Cristal	Won
2011	Premios El Heraldo de México	Best Actress	Para Volver a Amar	Nominated
2013	Premios Tu Mundo	The Best Bad Girl	Pasion prohibida	Nominated
2013	Premios Tu Mundo	First Actress	Pasion prohibida	Nominated
2014	Miami Life Awards	First Actress	Pasion prohibida	Nominated
2015	Premios Tu Mundo	First Actress	Senora Acero	Nominated
