= Julián Robles (actor) =

Mexican actor

- Occupation: Actor
- Parent: Fernando Robles (actor)
- Relatives: Fabián Robles

Julián Robles is a Mexican director, actor and screenwriter, mostly working in the telenovelas.

== Filmography ==
=== Actor ===
- El vuelo del águila (1994) — Félix Díaz (aged 15)

=== Director ===
- Flores Magon (2008)
- Catarsis (2010)
- Mimesis (2014) — with Ignacio López Tarso

=== Screenwriter ===
- La sombra del otro (1996)
- Sin pecado concebido (2001)
- Flores Magon (2008)
- Catarsis (2010)
- Mimesis (2014)

== Family ==
Julián is a son of the actor Fernando Robles and brother of the actor Fabián Robles (born 1974).
