= Imperio de cristal =

Mexican telenovela

- Genre: Telenovela
- Created by: Jaime García Estrada; Orlando Merino
- Story by: Alejandro Camacho; Rebecca Jones
- Directed by: Claudio Reyes Rubio
- Starring: Rebecca Jones; Alejandro Camacho; María Rubio; Ari Telch; Kate del Castillo; Ignacio López Tarso
- Music by: Bebu Silvetti
- Country of origin: Mexico
- Original language: Spanish
- No. of episodes: 120

Production
- Executive producer: Carlos Sotomayor
- Producer: Rafael Urióstegui
- Production locations: Mexico City, Mexico
- Cinematography: Carlos Guerra
- Production company: Televisa

Original release
- Network: Canal de las Estrellas
- Release: August 29, 1994 – February 17, 1995

Related
- Quiero amarte

Imperio de cristal (English title: Crystal Empire) is a Mexican telenovela produced by Carlos Sotomayor for Televisa in 1994.

Rebecca Jones, Alejandro Camacho, María Rubio, Ari Telch, Kate del Castillo and Ignacio López Tarso starred in this telenovela.

== Synopsis ==
Sofía Vidal (Rebecca Jones), her husband, Uriel (Constantino Costas), and their little daughter, Katia (Zoraida Gómez), attend a great party offered at the elegant mansion of the Lombardo family, powerful crystal entrepreneurs. After this, their life will never be the same.

Don César (Ignacio López Tarso), the patriarch of the Lombardos, discovers in Sofía the daughter of Elena (Rebecca Jones), his impossible love, who died tragically in an accident when Sofía was still a child. César, without Sofía knowing it, decides to protect her because of Elena's memory, which he cherishes still.

César is married in second nuptials to Livia Arizmendi (María Rubio), a former actress who dreams of recovering her career. Sofía's appearance seriously worries Livia, who considers her an intruder who could displace her, just as Elena would have done in the past. Livia, who hides a terrible secret involving Sofía, plots against her, trying to keep her out of the family.

Augusto (Alejandro Camacho), César and Livia's oldest son, is cruel and ambitious. His ultimate goal is to take hold of his father's empire by getting rid of Octavio (Alejandro Tommasi), César's son from his first marriage. Livia supports Augusto, since she hopes that once he has got the power, she will once again be able to become the great star she once was.

Julio (Ari Telch), the third son, returns after several years of studying abroad in order to marry his all-life girlfriend, Elisa (Ivette Proal). Julio is not keen on the family businesses, being this a reason for constant arguments with his father.

César and Livia's younger children are twins: Claudio (Germán Gutiérrez) and Narda (Kate del Castillo). Claudio suffers from infantile psychosis due to Augusto's abuse. As a result, he has been confined in a specialized institution for a long time, suffering from his family's rejection. Narda is a capricious and stubborn young woman, although she has also been a victim of her parents' lack of love.

Augusto becomes obsessed with Sofía and is determined to have her at any price, knowing besides that this is the way for his father to name him as his successor in the enterprises. Augusto does everything to end Sofía's marriage, until finally Uriel decides to abandon her and little Katia. Sofia and Julio meet and great passion arises between them to the extent that Julio is determined to face anything, even to put an end to his relationship with Elisa.

The rivalry between Augusto and Julio for Sofia's love lets forth a whirlwind of intrigue, corruption and violent struggle for power. Fragile, but dangerous as well, this crystal empire can be broken into a thousand pieces in the hands of the one who will try to possess it.

== Cast ==
=== Main ===
- Rebecca Jones as Sofía Vidal / Elena Vidal
- Alejandro Camacho as Augusto Lombardo
- María Rubio as Livia Arizmendi
- Ari Telch as Julio Lombardo
- Kate del Castillo as Narda Lombardo
- Ignacio López Tarso as César Lombardo

=== Recurring ===
- Aarón Hernán as Bernal
- Adriana Barraza as Flora
- Graciela Bernardos as Nora
- Óscar Bonfiglio as Germán
- Fabiola Campomanes as Juanita
- Emilia Carranza as Andrea
- Constantino Costas as Uriel
- Malena Doria as Trinidad
- Alan Fernando as Marco Aurelio
- Cecilia Gabriela as Esther
- Fidel Garriga as Rogelio
- Zoraida Gómez as Katia
- Dacia González as Renata
- Germán Gutiérrez as Claudio
- Lucero Lander as Diana
- Alicia Montoya as Antonia
- Aída Naredo as Lulú
- Ivette Proal as Elisa
- Alejandro Ruiz as Marcelo
- Héctor Sáez as Father Ángel
- Alejandro Tommasi as Octavio
- Amara Villafuerte as Mayra

== Awards and nominations ==
Year	Award	Category	Nominee(s)	Result	
1995	TVyNovelas Awards	Best Telenovela	Carlos Sotomayor	Won	
1995	TVyNovelas Awards	Best Actress	Rebecca Jones	Won	
1995	TVyNovelas Awards	Best Antagonist Actress	María Rubio	Won	
1995	TVyNovelas Awards	Best Antagonist Actor	Alejandro Camacho	Won	
1995	TVyNovelas Awards	Best Leading Actor	Ignacio López Tarso	Won	
1995	TVyNovelas Awards	Best Young Lead Actress	Kate del Castillo	Won	
1995	TVyNovelas Awards	Best Young Lead Actor	Germán Gutiérrez	Won	
1995	TVyNovelas Awards	Best Child Performance	Zoraida Gómez	Nominated	
1995	TVyNovelas Awards	El Heraldo de México Awards	Best Telenovela	Carlos Sotomayor	Nominated
1995	TVyNovelas Awards	El Heraldo de México Awards	Best Actress	Rebecca Jones	Won
1995	TVyNovelas Awards	Eres Awards	Best Actress	Kate del Castillo	Won
1995	Best Actor	Eres Awards	Ari Telch	Won	
