= María Rubio =

Mexican actress (1934–2018)

- Born: María Jesús Rubio Tejero; September 21, 1934; Tijuana, Baja California, Mexico
- Died: March 1, 2018 (aged 83); Mexico City, Mexico
- Occupation: Actress
- Years active: 1955–2012
- Spouse: Luis Reyes de la Maza (div.)
- Children: 2, including Claudio Reyes Rubio

María Rubio (September 21, 1934 – March 1, 2018) was a Mexican actress. She worked with Televisa on many telenovelas. She appeared as the villain Catalina Creel in the 1986–87 telenovela, Cuna de lobos.

== Filmography ==
General source for the tables below:

=== Films ===
Year	Title	Role	Notes
1966	El hijo de Huracán Ramírez	La gringa	
1970	La noche violenta		
1971	Intimidades de una secretaria		
1972	Nadie te querrá como yo	Madre Superior	
1976	La mujer es cosa de hombres		
1976	Morir, dormir, tal vez soñar		
1977	El bengador gusticiero y su pastelera madre		
1979	Cuarenta años sin sexo	Emilia	
1979	El rediezcubrimiento de México		
1980	Los primeros metros		
1981	Colegialas violadas	Countess Maria Gonzales	
1981	¿Por qué no hacemos el amor?		
1982	Las trampas del matrimonio		
1989	Venganza diabólica		
1990	Vivir o morir		
1992	Traficantes de niños		
1998	Fuera de la ley		
2005	Desdentado desde entonces		Short film

=== Television ===
Year	Title	Role	Notes
1955	Teatro fantástico		
1963	Doña Macabra		
1967	Lágrimas amargas		
1969	Sin palabras	Sara	
1969	Lo que no fue		
1970	La constitución	María	
1971	Muchacha italiana viene a casarse	Elena	
1971	Las máscaras		
1972	Me llaman Martina Sola		
1973	Entre brumas	Susan	
1974	Ana del aire	Nadia	
1975	El milagro de vivir		
1976	Mañana será otro día	Olivia	
1977	Rina	Rafaela	
1978	Sábado loco, loco	various	"Episodio 1" (Season 1, Episode 1)
1978	Pasiones encendidas	Lidia	
1980	Colorina	Ami	
1981	El derecho de nacer	Clemencia	
1984	Te amo	Consuelo	
1984	Tú eres mi destino	Úrsula	
1985	Abandonada	Carolina	
1986–1987	Cuna de lobos	Catalina Creel Vda. de Larios	
1988	"Color de Piel"	Alicia Umpierre de Gallardo	Filmed in Puerto Rico (see: Vicky Hernández (producer))
1994–1995	Imperio de cristal	Livia Arizmendi de Lombardo	
1997	Amada enemiga	Reinalda	
1997–1998	No tengo madre	Mamá Sarita	
1998	Desencuentro	Herself	
1999	Amor Gitano	Isolda	
1999–2000	Laberintos de pasión	Ofelia de Miranda	
2001–2002	Salomé	Lucrecía de Montesinos	
2002	XHDRbZ	Cacalina Creel	Episode: "Una de lobos"
2002	¡Vivan los niños!	Mrs. Arredondo	
2003	Mujer, Casos de la Vida Real	Mrs. Victoria	
2005	Desde Gayola	Tía Kika	
2006	Vecinos	Doña Socorro	Episode: "Aviso de desalojo"
2006–2007	Las dos caras de Ana	Doña Graciela Salgado Vda. de Alcaraz	
2007	La hora pico	Herself / Various roles	Episode: "Invited: María Rubio"
2007	Amor sin maquillaje	Herself	
2008	La rosa de Guadalupe	Cristina	Episode: "Cristinita"
2008	Querida enemiga	Hortensia Vallejo Vda. de Armendáriz	
2011–2012	Una familia con suerte	Inés de la Borbolla y Ruiz	
