= Mónika Sánchez =

Mexican actress (born 1974)

- Born: Mónika Analia Sánchez Torre; 3 December 1974 (age 51); Mexico City, Mexico
- Occupation: Actress
- Years active: 1992–present
- Spouse: Otto Seijas (m. 2008)
- Children: 3
- Parent(s): Fernando Sánchez-Mayans; Angela Torre
- Website: Official Website

Mónika Sánchez (born Mónika Analia Sánchez Torre on 3 December 1974 in Mexico City, Mexico) is a Mexican actress.

== Early life ==
Sánchez was born on 3 December 1974 in Mexico City. She is the daughter of Mexican writer and poet, Fernando Sánchez-Mayans and Angela Torre.

Moreover, she started acting and modeling at the Miami Community College and The Play House. This was when she realized that her main focus would be acting, so she then enrolled in the "Taller Artistico de Sergio Jimenez" at Televisa in Mexico City. Finally, Sánchez auditioned to be part of the CEA (Centro Educativo Artístico de Televisa), and began studying acting, TV techniques, theater, literature, English, dance, singing, culture, and many other arts. She began her career by doing castings, looking for opportunities, searching for producers and meeting them, and attending events where she could meet important people that could contribute to her future career as an actress.

== Career ==
Sánchez debuted in the 1992 telenovela Ángeles sin paraíso where she had a small participation. Then other opportunities followed: Buscando el paraíso, Corazón Salvaje, Caminos cruzados, Alondra, Lazos de Amor, Morir dos veces and Tú y yo. Sánchez starred as an antagonist in the telenovela Pueblo chico, infierno grande. The popularity of Sánchez for viewers, grew fast; and soon she was one of the most admired female antagonist in Mexíco. The mixture of sweetness and seduction that had not been seen before in a female antagonist, made her performances special and well-liked by viewers. She continued with great success again in antagonist roles in telenovelas: El diario de Daniela and Laberintos de pasión.

In 2000, TVyNovelas Awards recognized her as the Best Female Antagonist of the Year 2000 for her excellent work. In 2001, Sánchez played in the telenovela Salomé in the role of a fragile woman who dies for love. In 2003, she played in the telenovela La Otra; and 2004, Apuesta por un amor as the main antagonist and again in "La mariposa", that gave her another nomination as Best Female Antagonist of the Year 2005 in TVyNovelas Αwards, and followed two other appearances in the telenovela Amar sin límites in 2006 and Al diablo con los guapos in 2007.

After an absence in telenovelas for 4 years, she reappeared in Amores Verdaderos, produced by Nicandro Diaz Gonzalez, in the role of Cristina Balvanera Corona de Arriaga, with Eduardo Yáñez, Erika Buenfil, Sebastian Rulli and Marjorie de Sousa. In 2013, Sanchez had a special appearance in the telenovela Libre para amarte with singer Gloria Trevi, Gabriel Soto, and Eduardo Santamarina. In 2014 she played Gisela Cienfuegos in the telenovela La gata. Later in 2016-2017 she played Viridrina Betancourt in Tres veces Ana.

== Personal life ==
Sánchez in September 2008 she married the Venezuelan businessman Otto Seijas. They have three children: Santiago (born 2009), Angela Fernanda (born November 11, 2011) and Monika Constanza (born November 17, 2013).

== Filmography ==
Television
Year	Title	Role	Notes
1992-93	Ángeles sin paraíso	Andrea	Supporting Role
1993-94	Buscando el paraíso		Supporting Role
1993-94	Corazón Salvaje	Rosa	Supporting Role
1995	Caminos cruzados	Lucía	Supporting Role
1995	Alondra	Enriqueta	Supporting Role
1995-96	Lazos de Amor	Diana	Supporting Role
1996	Morir dos veces	Minerva	Supporting Role
1996-97	Tú y yo	Martha	Antagonist
1997	Pueblo chico, infierno grande	Indalecia Navas	Antagonist
1997-06	Mujer, casos de la vida real		12 Episodes
1998-1999	El diario de Daniela	Elena Ruiz	Main Antagonist
1999-2000	Laberintos de pasión	Nadia Román Valencia	Main Antagonist
2001	La Hora Pico (LHP)	Invited	1 Episode
2001-02	Salomé	Ángela Duval de Montesino	Special Appearance
2002	La Otra	Regina Salazar	Supporting Role
2002	Acapulco 2002		
2004-05	Apuesta por un amor	Eva Flores "La Mariposa"	Antagonist
2006-07	Amar sin límites	Silvana Lombardo	Antagonist
2007-13	La rosa de Guadalupe		1 Episode
2007-08	Al diablo con los guapos	Rosario Ramos #1	Supporting Role
2009	Mujeres Asesinas 2	Eva Cárdenas	Episode "Laura, confundida"
2012-13	Amores Verdaderos	Cristina Corona de Arriaga / Cristina Balvanera Corona de Arriaga	Supporting Role
2013-14	Libre para amarte	Zamira	Special Appearance
2014	Como dice el dicho	Rose	Episode "Una sola mano no aplaude"
2014	La gata	Gisela Cienfuegos	Antagonist
2016-17	Tres Veces Ana	Viridiana Betancourt	Supporting Role
2018	Eduacando a Nina	Paz Echegaray	Guest Star
2022-23	Mi camino es amarte	Amparo Santos de Hernández	Supporting Role

== Theater ==
Theater
Year
Mi quinto amor
Los signos del zodíaco
Eloísa bajo el almendro
Bajo las sábanas
El precio de la fama
Mujeres frente al espejo
Me enamoré de una bruja
Las Alas del Pez

== Awards and nominations ==
Year	Award	Category	Telenovela	Result
2000	Premios TVyNovelas	Best Female Antagonist	Laberintos de pasión	Won
2005	Premios TVyNovelas	Best Female Antagonist	Apuesta por un amor	Nominated

- Female Revelation Theatrical Journalists Association
- Revelation Youth Award 2001
- Mar Cruz Olivier Award
