= Alejandro Camacho =

Mexican actor and producer

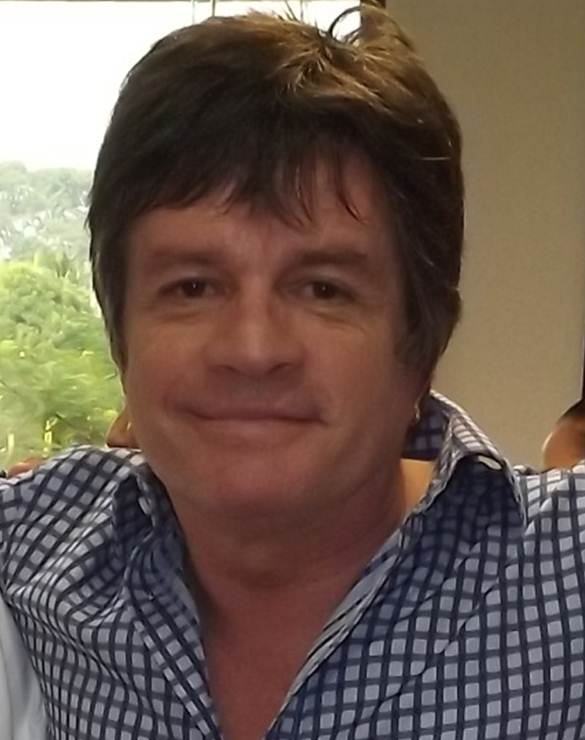
- Born: Alejandro Camacho Pastrana; July 11, 1954 (age 71); Mexico City, Mexico
- Occupations: Actor, producer
- Years active: 1980–present
- Children: 2

Alejandro Camacho Pastrana (born 11 July 1954) is a Mexican actor and producer.

== Filmography ==
=== Films ===
Year	Title	Role	Notes
1981	Alto riesgo	Obediente	Debut film
1981	Víctima de la seducción		
1982	En la tormenta		
1983	Los renglones torcidos de Dios		
1983	Bajo la metralla	Andrés	
1983	Silencio asesino	El Ruidos	
1984	Encuentro con la muerte		
1985	El hombre de la mandolina		
1985	La revancha		
1985	Forajidos en la mira		
1986	El maleficio 2: Los enviados del infierno	David	
1986	El tres de copas		
1987	Herencia maldita		
1989	Viaje directo al infierno	Carlos	
1989	Polvo de luz		
1990	La jaula de la muerte		
1990	Ciudad sin ley		
1992	Filtraciones		
1994	Guerrero Negro		
2003	Mujeres infieles II	Jorge	Segment: "Un hombre poderoso"
2003	Zurdo	Romo	
2004	Por mujeres como tú		
2004	Más allá del vacío		
2006	La brecha		
2006	El carnaval de Sodoma	Ponciano	
2007	Shirgo (La leyenda del Cagalar)	Octavio	
2007	Todos los días son tuyos	Carvajal	
2008	Divina confusión	Osiel	
2013	Sobre ella	Miguel	
2014	Seducción		
2017	Everybody Loves Somebody	Francisco	
2022	Incomplete Lovers	José	
2023	Mother's Day Is Cancelled	Francisco	

=== Television ===
Year	Title	Role	Notes
1980	Soledad		Television debut
1981	Juegos del destino	Álvaro	
1983	Cuando los hijos se van	Ignacio	
1984	La traición	Absalon	
1985	El ángel caído	Roberto Florescano	
1985	Angélica	Guillermo	
1986	Cuna de lobos	Alejandro Larios Creel	
1988	El extraño retorno de Diana Salazar	Dr. Omar Santelmo	
1991	Muchachitas	Federico Cantú	
1992	La sonrisa del Diablo	Hombre Misterioso	2 episodes
1994	Imperio de cristal	Augusto Lombardo	
1996	La sombra del otro	Iván	
1997	Mi pequeña traviesa	Dr. Raúl	
1999	Tres mujeres	Salvador Ortega	
1999	Amor gitano	Rodolfo Farnesio	
2003	Bajo la misma piel	Bruno Murillo Valdez	
2003	El alma herida	Salvador Grandos	
2008	Capadocia	José Burian	
2008-2009	Alma de hierro	José Antonio Hierro Ramírez	
2010-2011	Para volver a amar	Braulio Longoria Sampeiro	
2012	Abismo de pasión	Augusto Castañon	
2014-2015	Yo no creo en los hombres	Claudio Bustamante	
2015	Yo no creo en los hombres, el origen	Claudio Bustamante	Television film
2016	Entre correr y vivir	1 Mateo	
2017	La fiscal de hierro	Diego Trujillo	
2017	Supermax	El Ingeniero	
2018	Falsa Identidad	Augusto Orozco	
2020-2021	Imperio de mentiras	Eugenio Serrano	
2023	Minas de pasión	Julián Sánchez "El Tigre"	
2024	Marea de pasiones	Juan Marrero	
2026	Hermanas, un amor compartido	Leonel Montalvo Lizalde	
2026	Guardián de mi vida	Aramís Peralta-Avitia Cortázar	

=== Other works ===
Year	Title	Notes
1993	¡Aquí espaantan!	Producer
1994	El tesoro de Clotilde	Producer
1994	Guerrero Negro	Producer
1998	Huracán	Writer/director
2000	Magia	Cinematographer

== Awards and nominations ==
Year	Award	Category	Telenovela	Result
1986	TVyNovelas Awards	Best Male Antagonist	Angélica	Nominated
1987	TVyNovelas Awards	Best Male Antagonist	Cuna de lobos	Won
1992	TVyNovelas Awards	Best Male Antagonist	Muchachitas	Nominated
1995	TVyNovelas Awards	Best Male Antagonist	Imperio de cristal	Won
1997	TVyNovelas Awards	Best Male Antagonist	La sombra del otro	Nominated
2009	TVyNovelas Awards	Best Lead Actor	Alma de Hierro	Won
2011	TVyNovelas Awards	Best First Actor	Para Volver a Amar	Won
2013	TVyNovelas Awards	Best First Actor	Abismo de pasión	Won
