= List of Amor real characters =

This is a list of characters featured in the 2003 Mexican telenovela, Amor real.

== Cast ==
Main characters
Character	Notes	Portrayed by
Matilde Peñalver y Beristáin de Fuentes Guerra	Daughter of retired army general, Hilario Peñalver y Beristáin, and doña, Augusta Curiel. Matilde is a distinguished young lady, an aristocrat educated under the strict moral norms of the epoch. Nevertheless, she breaks the social code of her class by falling in love with a penniless soldier, Adolfo Solís. However, due to intrigues and family pressures, she is deceived and forced to marry a rich landlord, Manuel Fuentes Guerra, in order to save the family from bankruptcy.	Adela Noriega
Manuel Fuentes Guerra	Illegitimate son of a rich landlord, Joaquín Fuentes Guerra, and a poor indigenous villager, Rosario Aranda. Manuel spent his first years of life in poverty and became seemingly tough, but fair and generous. Later, he managed to graduate from medical school and become a surgeon. As an adult, he inherited a vast fortune from his father. Despite his loathing for aristocrats, he falls in love with Matilde Peñalver, believing the feelings are mutual.	Fernando Colunga
Adolfo Solís; Felipe Santamaría	Son of a once-respectable family who studied at the military school where he received military training and strict education. Adolfo is conservative, although not because of his conviction, but because of his obedience to military laws. He falls profoundly in love with Matilde Peñalver and refuses to break up their relationship, despite knowing her family would reject him, because of his poor economic status. Using her influences, Augusta Curiel, sends him to prison.	Mauricio Islas

Supporting characters
Character	Actor — Actress
Augusta Curiel de Peñalver y Beristáin	Helena Rojo
Humberto Peñalver y Beristáin	Ernesto Laguardia
Rosario Aranda	Ana Martín
Antonia Morales	Chantal Andere
Josefina de Icaza	Mariana Levy
Urbano de las Casas	Mauricio Herrera
Prudencia Curiel de Alonso	Ana Bertha Espín
Renato Piquet	Mario Iván Martínez
Marianne Bernier; Marie de la Roquette	Maya Mishalska
Sixto Valdez	Oscar Bonfiglio
Delfino Pérez	Adalberto Parra
Silvano Arzola	Héctor Saez
Catalina Heredia de Solís	Kika Edgar
Pilar Piquet de Márquez	Ingrid Martz
Damiana García	Beatriz Sheridan
Ramón Marquez	Carlos Cámara
Yves Santibáñez de la Roquette	Harry Geithner
Jana de la Corcuera	Leticia Calderón
José María de Icaza	Luis Xavier
Amadeo Corona	Rafael Rojas

Special appearances
Character	Actor — Actress
Joaquín Fuentes Guerra	Julio Alemán
General Hilario Peñalver y Beristáin	Ricardo Blume
Juana Domínguez Palafox	Yolanda Mérida
María Clara de Heredia	Raquel Morell
Gregorio Heredia	Paco Ibáñez
General Prisco Domínguez Cañero	Jorge Vargas
Remigio Quintero	Manuel Ibañez
Madre Superiora	Maty Huitrón
Gervasio	Gastón Tuset

Child characters
Character	Actor — Actress
Manuel Hilario Fuentes; Guerra Peñalver y Beristáin	Alejandro Felipe
María Fernanda Heredia	Fátima Torre

== See also ==
- Amor Real
