= 22nd TVyNovelas Awards =

2004 Mexican TV awards

- Date: March 3, 2004
- Location: Mexico D.F.
- Hosted by: Víctor Noriega & Laisha Wilkins

Highlights
- Most awards: Amor real (9)
- Most nominations: Amarte es mi pecado (11); Amor real (11)

Television/radio coverage
- Network: Canal de las Estrellas

The 22nd TVyNovelas Awards were an academy of special awards to the best soap operas and TV shows. The awards ceremony took place on March 3, 2004 in Mexico D.F. The ceremony was televised in Mexico by Canal de las Estrellas and in the United States by Univision.

Víctor Noriega and Laisha Wilkins hosted the show. Amor real won 9 awards, the most for the evening, including Best Telenovela. Other winners Amarte es mi pecado won 3 awards, Mariana de la noche won 2 awards and Alegrijes y rebujos won 1 award.

== Summary of awards and nominations ==
Telenovela	Nominations	Awards
Amor real	11	9
Amarte es mi pecado	11	3
Mariana de la noche	7	2
Alegrijes y rebujos	3	1
Clap, el lugar de tus sueños	3	0
Velo de novia	3	0
Bajo la misma piel	1	0

== Winners and nominees ==
=== Telenovelas ===
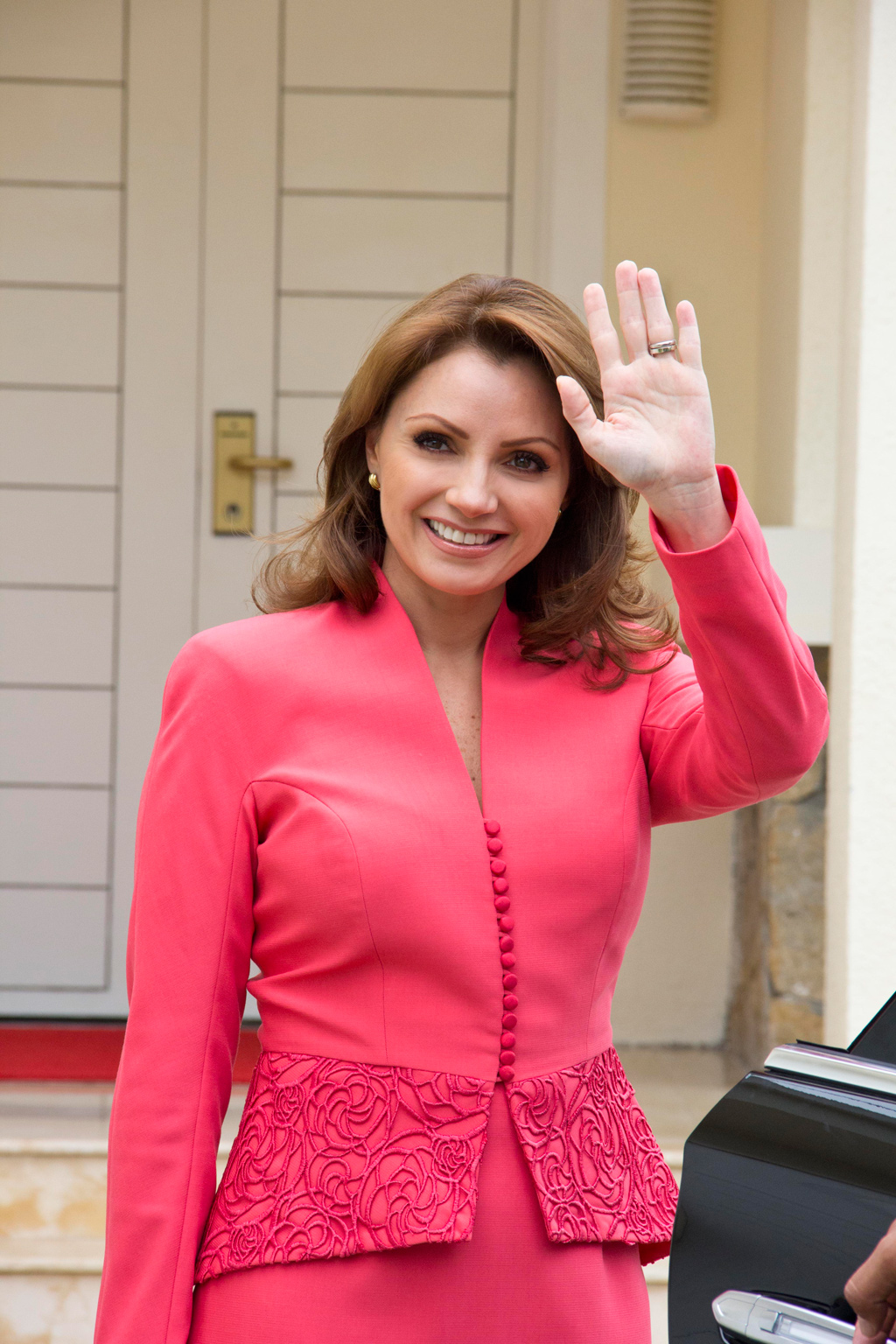
Angélica Rivera, winner for Best Antagonist Actress.

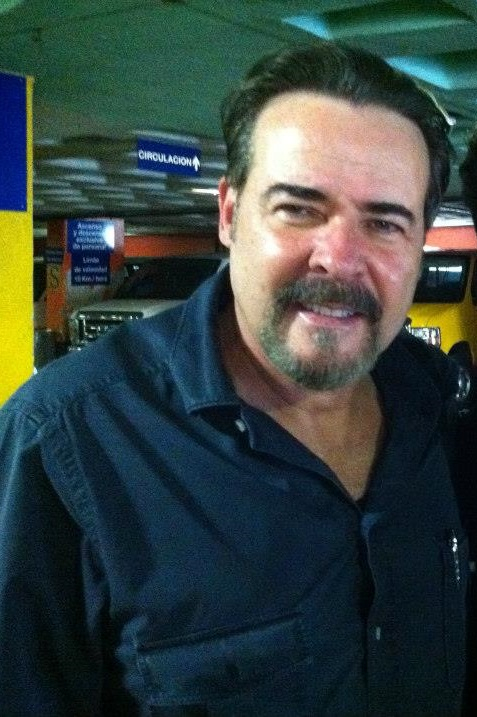
César Évora, winner for Best Antagonist Actor.

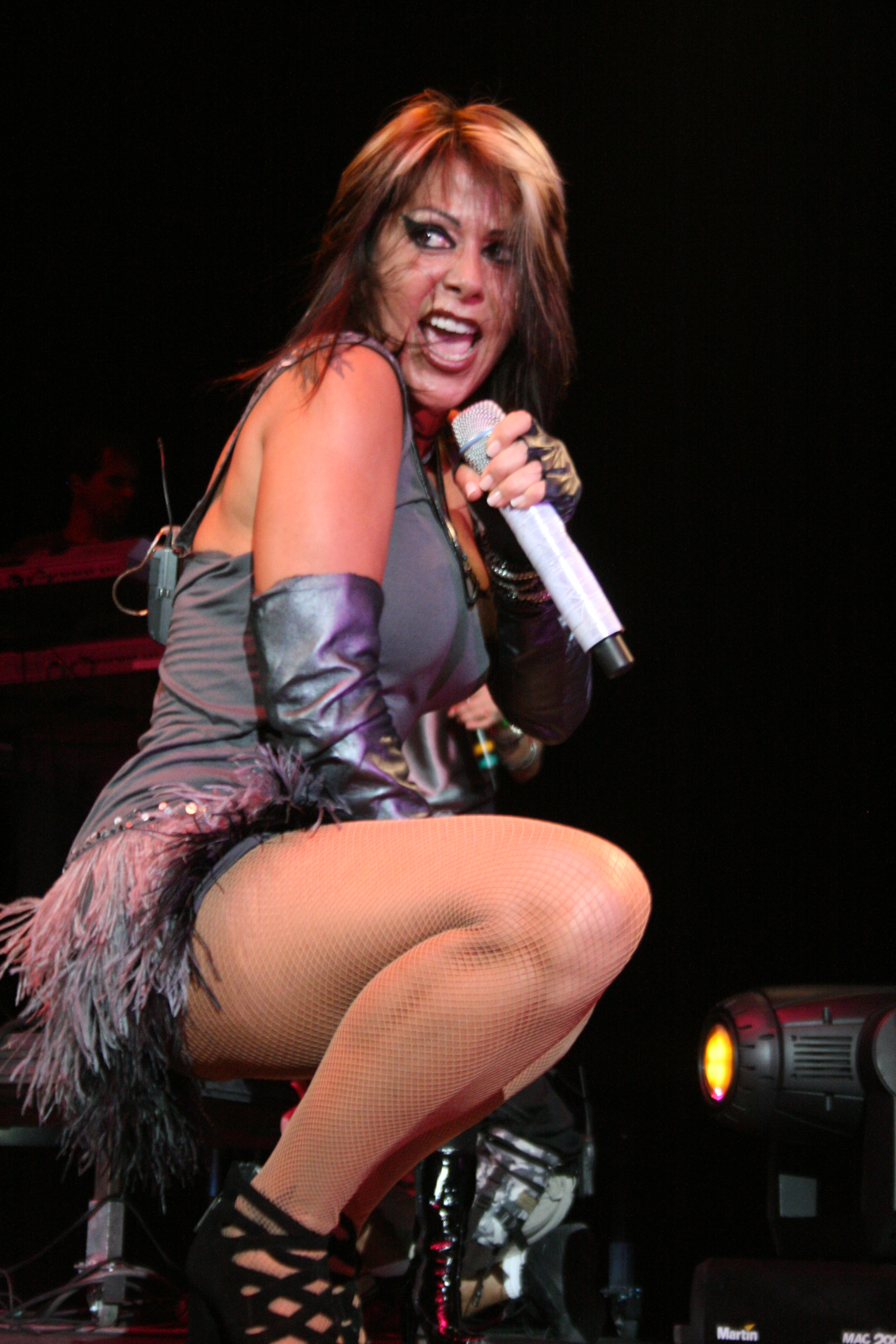
Alejandra Guzmán, winner for Best Singer of the Year.

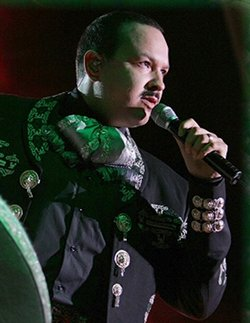
Pepe Aguilar, winner for Best International Singer of the Year.

Best Telenovela	Best Original Story or Adaptation
Amor real; Amarte es mi pecado; Mariana de la noche	María Zarattini – Amor real
Best Actress	Best Actor
Adela Noriega – Amor real; Susana González – Velo de novia; Yadhira Carrillo – Amarte es mi pecado	Fernando Colunga – Amor real; Jorge Salinas – Mariana de la noche; Sergio Sendel – Amarte es mi pecado
Best Antagonist Actress	Best Antagonist Actor
Angélica Rivera – Mariana de la noche; Chantal Andere – Amor real; Sylvia Pasquel – Amarte es mi pecado	César Évora – Mariana de la noche; Alejandro Camacho – Bajo la misma piel; Héctor Suárez – Velo de novia
Best Leading Actress	Best Leading Actor
Ana Martín – Amor real; Patricia Reyes Spíndola – Mariana de la noche; Sylvia Pasquel – Amarte es mi pecado	Carlos Cámara – Amor real; Héctor Ortega – Alegrijes y rebujos; José Carlos Ruiz – Mariana de la noche
Best Co-lead Actress	Best Co-lead Actor
Ana Bertha Espín – Amor real; Adriana Fonseca – Mariana de la noche; Tiaré Scanda – Amarte es mi pecado	Ernesto Laguardia – Amor real; Alexis Ayala – Amarte es mi pecado; Arath de la Torre – Alegrijes y rebujos
Best Female Revelation	Best Male Revelation
Jacqueline Bracamontes – Alegrijes y rebujos; Alessandra Rosaldo – Amarte es mi pecado; Kika Edgar – Clap, el lugar de tus sueños	Jan – Amarte es mi pecado; Ari Borovoy – Clap, el lugar de tus sueños; Mauricio Martínez – Clap, el lugar de tus sueños
Best Musical Theme	Best Musical Theme Composer
"Amarte es mi pecado" — Alessandra Rosaldo and Ricardo Montaner – Amarte es mi pecado; "Amor real" — Sin Bandera – Amor real; "De corazón a corazón (Inevitable)" — Darina – Velo de novia	Jorge Avendaño — "Amarte es mi pecado" – Amarte es mi pecado

=== Others ===
Best Comedy Program	Best Reality Show
La familia P.Luche; La escuelita VIP; La hora pico	Big Brother VIP
Best Singer of the Year	Best International Singer of the Year
Alejandra Guzmán	Pepe Aguilar
Debut as a Singer	Best Host or Hostess
Mariana Seoane	Adal Ramones

=== Special awards ===
- Telenovela with the Highest Rating in 2003: Amor real
- Best Production: La parodia
- Career as an Actress: Ofelia Guilmáin
- Career as an Actor: Aarón Hernán
- 30 Years of Career as an Actress and Singer: Daniela Romo
- Best Hostess and a Pioneer in the Internationalization of Telenovelas: Verónica Castro
- Children's Time Slot per Production: Rosy Ocampo
