= Pasión (TV series) =

- Genre: Telenovela; Historical fiction Romance; Drama
- Created by: María Zarattini
- Written by: Guenia Argomedo; Pilar Pedroza
- Directed by: Karina Dupréz; Mónica Miguel
- Starring: Susana González; Fernando Colunga; Daniela Castro; Sebastián Rulli; Juan Ferrara
- Theme music composer: Jorge Avendaño
- Opening theme: Pasión performed by Sarah Brightman and Fernando Lima
- Country of origin: Mexico
- Original language: Spanish
- No. of episodes: 95 (41-44 minutes)

Production
- Executive producer: Carla Estrada
- Producers: Guillermo Gutiérrez; Arturo Lorca
- Cinematography: Carlos Sánchez Ross; Alejandro Frutos
- Editors: Juan Franco; Luis Horacio Valdés
- Camera setup: Multi-camera
- Running time: 41-44 minutes (episodes 1-70, 86-90); 21-22 minutes (episodes 71-85, 91-115)
- Production company: Televisa

Original release
- Network: Canal de las Estrellas
- Release: September 17, 2007 – February 22, 2008

Pasión (English title: Passion) is a Mexican telenovela produced by Carla Estrada for Televisa in 2007. It is the fourth historical fiction telenovela produced by Carla Estrada after Alondra, Amor real and Alborada.

It's located in a colonial Mexico of 1740 where the love of "El Antillano" and Camila, a pirate and a poor girl who is bought by an old millionaire.

Susana González, Fernando Colunga and Sebastián Rulli starred as protagonists, while Daniela Castro, José Elías Moreno, Juan Ferrara and Maite Embil starred as antagonists.

== History ==
Production of Pasión began on April 23, 2007. On Monday, September 17, 2007, Canal de las Estrellas started broadcast it at 9:00 p.m., replacing Destilando Amor.

On Monday, September 17, 2007, Canal de las Estrellas started broadcasting Pasión weekdays at 9:00pm, replacing Destilando Amor. The last episode was broadcast on Friday, February 22, 2008 with Fuego en la sangre replacing it the following day.

On Tuesday, December 4, 2007, Univision started broadcasting Pasión weeknights at 9pm/8c, replacing Destilando Amor. The last episode was broadcast on Friday, April 25, 2008 with Fuego en la sangre replacing it Monday, April 28, 2008.

== Plot ==
Camila, the daughter of Don Justo Darién is celebrating her engagement to Santiago, the normal blacksmith when all of a sudden Don Jorge Mancera y Ruiz arrives. He has decided to have his “Droit du seigneur” with Camila. After Santiago is hurt, Camila agrees to go with him. Later, in Don Jorge's bedroom, the man drinks himself into a stupor and falls asleep without having touched her. Camila manages to escape and makes her way back to the village, only to find that nobody believes that she remains a virgin.

A few days later, the village is attacked by vicious pirates. Some of the villagers are led back to the ship to be sold as slaves in the Caribbean. Among them is Camila. She had been by Santiago's side while he remained in a coma due to his injury and everyone believed that he was about to die. She had run away to escape her grief and had been knocked unconscious and taken. On the way to the pirate's ship she is raped by the men who had taken her away. The captain of the pirate ship, known as "El Antillano" the handsome man, finds her attractive and in a brief moment of weakness, feels moved to protect her from her cruel fate, but that moment quickly passes. Camila is eventually sold to a bitter old man named Don Timoteo De Salamanca, whose plan is to leave his hated family in ruins by marrying his slave Camilla Darien and naming her his sole heir. His daughter Lisabeta, who was left blind due to an illness she suffered as a child, and his spinster sister Doña Francisca despise Camila. Lisabeta maintains a friendly relationship with her outcast cousin who was at first the fortune's heir before his father died and he was framed by a murder he did not commit. While on the run he was taken prisoner by a pirate and made to join their crew.

Not long after, Don Timoteo passes away and Camila finds herself free and in possession of a vast fortune. The hatred for Camila by Lisabeta and Doña Francisca grows since Don Timoteo had promised to leave his whole fortune to Lisabeta. Don Timoteo had also stated in his will that Camila could not give any part of her fortune away because then her freedom could be revoked and she could be made a slave again. With no other choice she plans to leave but before she does she secretly leaves a chestful of coins for Lisabeta and Francisca. She returns to her home, where she learns that everyone, including Santiago, believed her dead, and now he is married to her sister Rita. A short time later, Don Timoteo's nephew, Ricardo, turns up unexpectedly with Lisabeta and Doña Francisca so that they can argue that Camila was not Don Timoteo's legitimate wife since their marriage was never consummated and that the fortune must go back to Lisabeta. He is none other than "El Antillano". The handsome pirate once again feels the need to protect her. Camila knows that he has come to recover his family's money, yet against her better judgment, she falls in love with him, and he with her. Meanwhile, Santiago's old feelings for Camila are rekindled, and a fierce rivalry springs up between him and Ricardo.

Santiago professes his love to Camila, but her heart is torn in two as she knows she can no longer have him. Ricardo, a fugitive of the law and proud, indomitable rogue, has awakened her soul to a love that grows stronger with each passing day, and, for the first time, her body is stirred with the flames of burning passion.

Among the protagonists' family and friends are a number of supporting characters that bring more drama and love to the story. Among them is Ines, Santiago's naive little sister who submits to a night of passion with Camila's womanizing older brother Vasco and results in them being married by their families. While Ines is thrilled about having Vasco as her husband, he remains the same as he always has been and continues to chase after other women, among them is Ursula who is Don Jorge Mancera y Ruiz's only daughter. Ines, though, continues to believe that Vasco will one day love her just as much as she has loved him her whole life.

Another couple that the story focuses on is Ascanio and Manuela who, due to being in different social ranks, suffer continually because they cannot be together. Ascanio used to be a slave and was freed when Camila inherited her husband's fortune and decided to buy his freedom along with fellow slaves Jimena and Claudio. Manuela is the meek and physically abused only child of Don Alberto Lafont who constantly ridicules and beats her. Manuela falls in love with Ascanio and he with her but they are forced to meet and talk in secret since Manuela is a high born lady and her secret meetings with an ex-slave would damage her reputation and her father would most likely kill both of them.

Mario and Jimena are the two sarcastic best friends of main couple Camila and Ricardo. Mario has been by Ricardo's side as a pirate for many years and maintains a deep loyalty to him. While he is amused that Ricardo has fallen in love, he supports him however he can and strikes up a friendship with Jimena, who is Camila's best friend. Jimena has had a very difficult life prior to being sold as a slave but that has not let her bring her down. The two are often teasing their respective friends all the time but are also quick to defend them and come to their aid whenever they are needed. While their friends go through many obstacles, they are forced into the same situations time and time again until their innocent flirtations begin to form into something more.

The whole story is set in the time of young women in full skirts and gentlemen with a sword within arm's reach. The characters are thrown into various situations where love and passion prevail.

== Cast ==
=== Main ===
- Susana González as Camila Darién De de Salamanca/Camila Darién de de Salamanca y Almonte
- Fernando Colunga as Ricardo de Salamanca y Almonte "El Antillano"/Ricardo López de Carbajal
- Daniela Castro as María Lisabeta de Salamanca
- Sebastián Rulli as Santiago Márquez/Santiago Mancera y Ruiz
- Juan Ferrara as Jorge Mancera y Ruiz

=== Also main ===
- Rocío Banquells as Ofelia de Márquez
- José Elías Moreno as Alberto Lafont y Espinoza
- Gabriela Rivero as Fortunata Mendonza
- Raymundo Capetillo as Justo Darién
- Maty Huitrón as Francisca de Salamanca
- Mariana Karr as Sofía Mendoza de Mancera y Ruiz
- Kika Edgar as Inés Márquez de Darién
- Alberto Estrella as Mario Fuentes
- Maya Mishalska as Úrsula Mancera y Ruiz Mendoza
- Maite Embil as Rita Darién de Márquez/Rita Darién de Mancera y Ruiz
- Marcelo Córdoba as Ascanio González
- Marisol del Olmo as Jimena Hernández
- Anaís as Manuela Lafont y Espinoza
- William Levy as Vasco Darién
- Toño Infante as Gonzalo
- Lorena Enríquez as Conchita
- Antonio Brenan as Crispín
- Jorge Brenan as Pancho
- Alejandro Felipe as Paco Darién
- Arturo Vázquez as Pablo
- Carlos López Estrada as Claudio Fernández de la Cueva
- Germán Robles as Timoteo de Salamanca
- Eric del Castillo as Gaspar de Valdez
- Isela Vega as La Paisana

=== Special participation ===
- Luis José Santander as John Foreman
- Rafael Inclán as Pirate
- Emoé de la Parra as Mercedes Vda. de de Salamanca
- Jorge Trejo as Ángel
- Xorge Noble as Bermejo
- Alejandro Ávila as Juancho
- Hugo Macías Macotela as Marcelino
- Tina Romero as Faustina
- Iliana de la Garza as Cleotilde
- Toño Mauri as Álvaro Fernández de la Cueva
- Yoshio as El Chino
- Luis Couturier as Padre Lorenzo
- Evelyn Solares as Ágata
- Rafael Rojas as José María de Valencia
- María Dolores Oliva as Auxiliadora
- Kokin as Bartolomé

== Awards and nominations ==
Year	Award	Category	Nominee	Result
2007	Premios Califa de Oro	Best Telenovela of the Year	Carla Estrada	Won
2007	Premios Califa de Oro	Best Performance of the Year	José Elías Moreno	Won
2007	Premios Califa de Oro	Best Performance of the Year	Mariana Karr	Won
2007	Premios Califa de Oro	Best Performance of the Year	William Levy	Won
2007	Premios Califa de Oro	Best Performance of the Year	Sebastián Rulli	Won
2007	Premios Califa de Oro	Best Performance of the Year	Susana González	Won
2007	Premios Califa de Oro	Best Performance of the Year	Rocío Banquells	Won
2008	26th TVyNovelas Awards	Best Performance of the Year		
2008	26th TVyNovelas Awards	Best Telenovela of the Year	Carla Estrada	Nominated
2008	26th TVyNovelas Awards	Best Actress	Susana González	Nominated
2008	26th TVyNovelas Awards	Best Actor	Fernando Colunga	Nominated
2008	26th TVyNovelas Awards	Best Antagonist Actress	Daniela Castro	Nominated
2008	26th TVyNovelas Awards	Best Antagonist Actor	José Elías Moreno	Nominated
2008	26th TVyNovelas Awards	Best Co-star Actress	Marisol del Olmo	Won
2008	26th TVyNovelas Awards	Best Co-lead Actor	Sebastián Rulli	Nominated
2008	26th TVyNovelas Awards	Best Leading Actress	Isela Vega	Nominated
2008	26th TVyNovelas Awards	Best Leading Actor	Germán Robles	Won
2008	26th TVyNovelas Awards	Best Original Story or Adaptation	María Zarattini	Nominated
2008	26th TVyNovelas Awards	Best Direction	Mónica Miguel	Nominated
2008	26th TVyNovelas Awards	Best Direction of the Camaras	Alejandro Frutos	Nominated
2008	Premios Sol de Oro	Best Telenovela	Pasión	Won
2008	Premios Bravo	Male Revelation	William Levy	Won
2008	Premios Bravo	Male Generic Stellar Performance	José Elias Moreno	Won
2009	Premios ACE	Best Telenovela	Carla Estrada	Won
2009	Premios ACE	Best Co-lead Male	José Elias Moreno	Won
2009	Premios ACE	Best Characteristic Actor	Hugo Macías Macotela	Won
2009	Premios ACE	Best Direction	Mónica Miguel	Won
