= La Guzmán =

La Guzmán may refer to:

- La Guzmán: Primera Fila
- La Guzman, album by Alejandra Guzmán
- La Guzmán (TV series)
