= Fernando Colunga =

Mexican actor (born 1966)

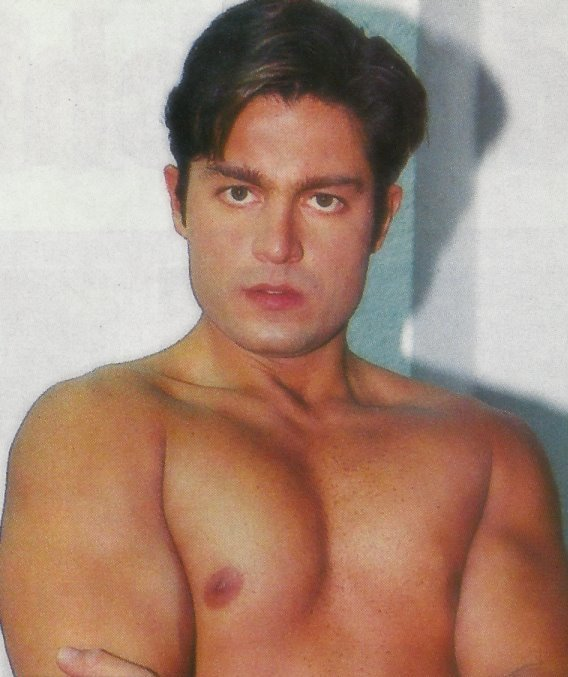
- Colunga in the 1980s
- Born: Fernando Colunga Olivares; 3 March 1966 (age 60); Mexico City, Mexico
- Citizenship: Mexico; United States
- Occupation: Actor
- Years active: 1987–present
- Website: www.colungateam.com

Fernando Colunga Olivares (Spanish pronunciation: [feɾˈnando koˈluŋɡa oliˈβaɾes]; born 3 March 1966) is a Mexican actor known for his work in Mexican telenovelas.

Colunga gained international fame for his role as Luis Fernando de la Vega in the hit Mexican telenovela María la del Barrio. He is also widely recognized for portraying Manuel Fuentes-Guerra in the historical drama Amor real, set in mid-19th century post-independence Mexico. In 2012, he starred as Jesús García in the romantic comedy telenovela Porque el amor manda.

Colunga received his formal acting education at the Centro de Educación Artística (CEA), a drama school run by Televisa in Mexico City.

== Career ==
Colunga worked as an actor in 1988, when he debuted twice as Eduardo Yañez's stuntman in the soap opera Dulce desafío. After that, he decided to start his acting career and enrolled in the Centro de Educación Artística de Televisa in 1990. In his early career, he was known to many audiences for his role in the Mexican version of Sesame Street. Colunga also starred in other shows, such as The Web, Marked Time, and All of It.

He starred in telenovelas, including Cenizas y diamantes, Madres egoístas and Maria Mercedes. Carla Estrada offered him a role in the soap opera, Más allá del puente, together with Maria Sorté in 1993–1994. After this telenovela, Colunga played a role in Marimar. In 1994, the film Bésame en la boca featuring Colunga and Paulina Rubio, was shown in the cinema. In 1995, Colunga played the role of Lieutenant Raul Gutierrez in Alondra, a period novel produced by Carla Estrada. He acted alongside Veronica Merchant, Gonzalo Vega, Ernesto Laguardia, Marga Lopez, Ana Colchero, Juan Manuel Bernal, Beatriz Sheridan, and Eric del Castillo.

In 1995–1996, Colunga got his first starring role with Thalía in the telenovela, Maria la del Barrio, giving life to Luis Fernando de la Vega. With this telenovela, Colunga began to be known internationally and established his sex symbol status.

He later starred in Esmeralda (1997) with Leticia Calderon, seen in countries as disparate as Indonesia and the Czech Republic. After the success of Esmeralda, he made a foray into theater with Original Sin Not where he starred with Chantal Andere, as Jenny and Bill, in an unhappy marriage in the process of destruction. His next show was in 1998, La Usurpadora, with Venezuelan actress Gabriela Spanic, Juan Pablo Gamboa, Chantal Andere, Alejandro Ruiz, Enrique Lizalde and Dominika Paleta. He played Carlos Daniel Bracho, a man who knows that the usurper, Paulina, has replaced his wife Paola, and is being blackmailed for it.

His next telenovela were Nunce Te Olvidare (1999) by Edith Gonzalez and Abrazame Muy Fuerte (2000) with Aracely Arambula, Victoria Ruffo, Cesar Evora and Nailea Norvind. After this, he spent time away from telenovelas to study acting and production. He also played a role in Navidad sin fin in 2001. In 2003, he worked in Amor real with Adela Noriega; a production of Carla Estrada, where he played Manuel Fuentes Guerra, the bastard son of a rich landowner. He starred alongside Mauricio Islas and Helena Rojo. In 2003, he won the TVyNovelas Award for Best Actor. After Amor Real, Colunga took some time from TV acting and concentrated on theater. Along with César Evora, he adapted screenplays and launched Death Trap.

After spending several months touring with his work, Colunga returned to television with the telenovela of Carla Estrada, Alborada (2005) and Pasion (2007). He shared the stage with actors like Valentino Lanús, Daniela Romo, Mariana Garza, Luis Roberto Guzmán, Vanessa Guzman, Arturo Peniche, Irán Castillo, Susana González, Sebastián Rulli, and Daniela Castro.

In 2008, he worked on the telenovela Manana Es Para Siempre sharing credits with Silvia Navarro and Lucero. This telenovela is produced by Nicando Diaz, in which he plays Eduardo Juarez, a man who, for his revenge against Barbara Greco (Lucero) changes his name to Franco Santoro. In 2010, he was the star of the telenovela Soy tu dueña produced by Nicandro Diaz; he shared credit with Lucero, Gabriela Spanic, and Jacqueline Andere.

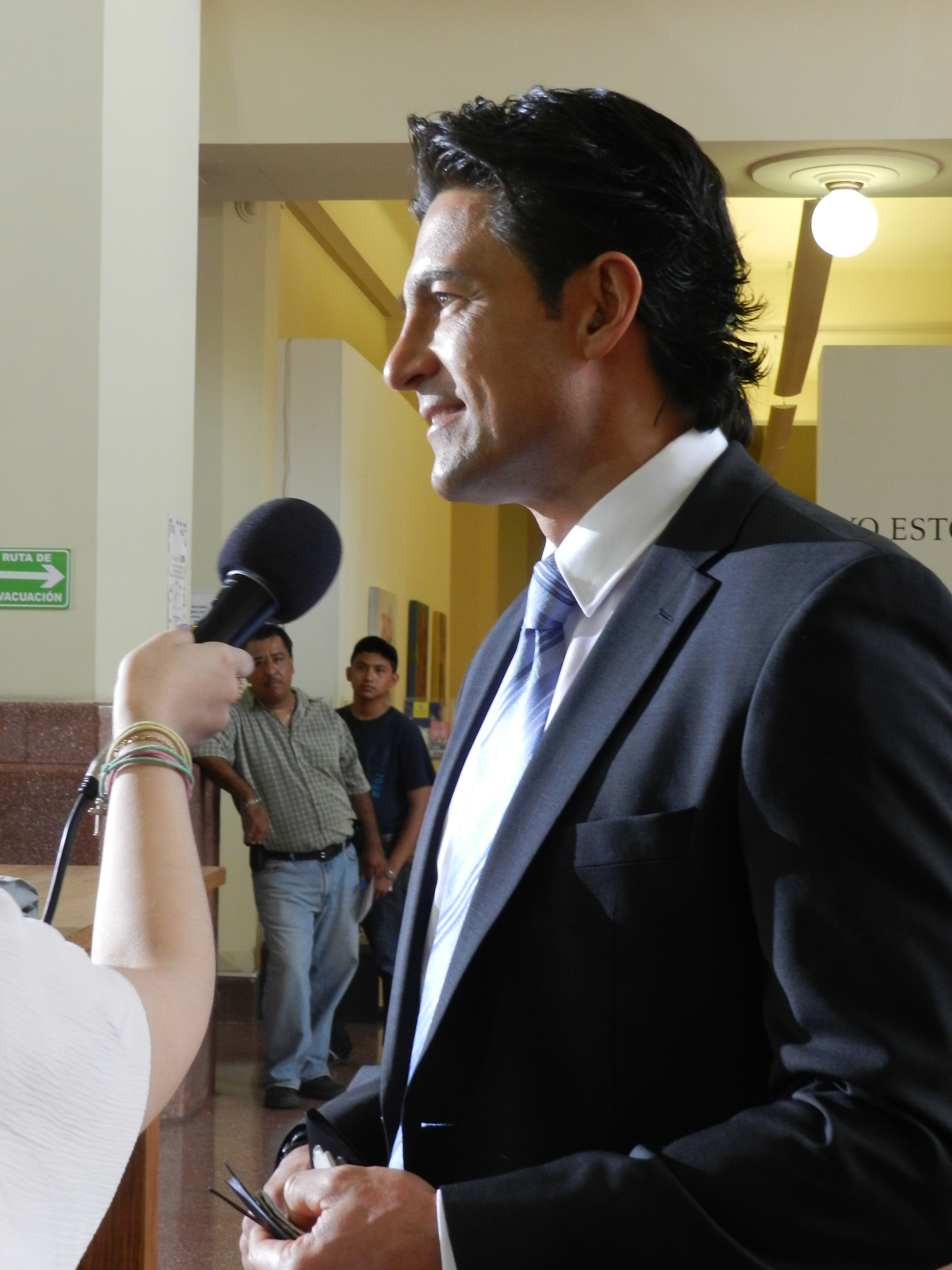
Fernando Colunga, 2012.

In 2012, he starred in Porque el amor manda with Blanca Soto, Erick Elias, and Claudia Alvarez, debuting in the genre of telenovela with a comic touch. Porque el Amor Manda is a Mexican telenovela produced by Juan Osorio. It was an adaptation of the 2011 Secretary. This starred Colunga and Blanca Soto, with Erick Elias and Claudia Alvarez, who play the main antagonists of the story.

In 2015, he worked on the telenovela Pasión y Poder sharing credits with Jorge Salinas and Susana González.

== Filmography ==
=== Films ===
Year	Title	Role	Ref.	Notes
1988	La guerrera vengadora	Unknown role		Mexico
1995	Bésame En La Boca	Arturo		Mexico
2007	Ladrón que roba a ladrón	Alejandro Toledo		United States
2009	Wild About Harry	Danny		Canada
2015	Ladrones	Alejandro Toledo		United States

=== Television performances ===
Year	Title	Role	Notes	Ref.
1988	Dulce desafío	Unknown	Stunt	
1990	Cenizas y diamantes	Unknown role		
1991	Alcanzar una estrella II	Unknown role		
1991	Madres egoístas	Jorge		
1992	María Mercedes	Chicho		
1993	Marianela	Pablo Ordoñez	Main role	
1993	Más allá del puente	Valerio		
1994	Mujer, casos de la vida real	Unknown role	Episode: "Te olvidaré"	
1994	Marimar	Adrián Rosales		
1995	María la del Barrio	Luis Fernando de la Vega	Main role	
1995	Alondra	Raúl Gutiérrez		
1997	Esmeralda	José Armando Peñarreal De Velasco	Main role	
1998	La Usurpadora	Carlos Daniel Bracho	Main role	
1998	Más allá de la Usurpadora	Carlos Daniel Bracho	Main role	Television film
1999	Cuento de Navidad	Jaime Rodríguez Coder		
1999	Nunca Te Olvidaré	Luis Gustavo Uribe Del Valle	Main role	
2000	Abrázame muy fuerte	Carlos Manuel Rivero	Main role	
2001	Navidad sin fin	Pedro		
2002	XHDRbZ	José	Episode: "Una de lobos"	
2003	Amor real	Manuel Fuentes Guerra	Main role	
2005	Alborada	Luis Manrique y Arellano	Main role	
2007	Pasión	Ricardo de Salamanca y Almonte/"El Antillano"	Main role	
2008	Mañana es para siempre	Eduardo Juárez Cruz / Franco Santoro	Main role	
2009	El Show de Cristina	Himself	Special	
2010	Soy tu dueña	José Miguel Montesinos	Main role	
2012	Porque el amor manda	Jesús García	Main role	
2015	Pasión y Poder	Eladio Gómez Luna	Main role	
2022	El secreto de la familia Greco	Aquiles Greco	Main role	
2023	El maleficio	Enrique de Martino	Main role	
2024	El Conde: Amor y honor	Alejandro Gaitán / Count Joaquín de Montenegro	Main role	
2025	Amanecer	Leonel	Main role	

== See also ==
- TVyNovelas Award for Best Lead Actor
