= Soraya Montenegro =

- María la del Barrio character
- Soraya Montenegro, played by Itatí Cantoral in the original telenovela, María la del Barrio
- Portrayed by: Itatí Cantoral (1995 version); Paw Diaz (2011 version); Fabiola Guajardo (Los ricos también lloran (2022 TV series)
- Duration: 1995–1996
- Created by: Valentín Pimstein
- Introduced by: Angelli Nesma Medina
- Crossover appearances: Orange Is the New Black (Cantoral's incarnation)
- Soraya Montenegro, played by Paw Diaz in the Philippine remake, Maria la del Barrio
In-universe information
- Parents: Nana Calixta
- Spouse: Luis Fernando de la Vega; Oscar Montalbán
- Stepchildren: Alicia Montalbán
- Aunts and uncles: Victoria de la Vega; Fernando de la Vega
- First cousins: Vanessa de la Vega; Vladimir de la Vega; Luis Fernando de la Vega

Soraya Montenegro is a fictional character in the Mexican telenovela María la del Barrio. Soraya is the typical villain of Mexican melodramas: she serves as a prominent antagonist and is characterized by violence, jealousy, and emotional instability. She was portrayed by Itatí Cantoral in the original Mexican series and became one of the most recognizable villains in telenovelas as a consequence of the popularity of María la del Barrio worldwide. Her popularity reached a new peak with the rise of social media, where her performances are enjoyed for being overly dramatic.

== Concept and creation ==
Soraya Montenegro was conceived by Mexican producer Valentin Pimstein as the antagonist of the first story arc of María la del Barrio, a remake of 1979 telenovela Los ricos también lloran. Soraya is loosely based on Esther Izaguirre, one of the villains of the old telenovela, but with considerable changes to her background, origin and mental state. Pimstein originally intended Soraya to die at the end of the first story arc. Nevertheless, he brought her back stating that Thalia needed a strong counterpart that could test her role as the heroine of the story.

== Character biography ==
=== Original series ===
Soraya Montenegro is the wealthy and evil niece of Victoria Montenegro de la Vega. She likes Luis Fernando and intends to marry him, but he falls in love with María instead. Soraya manages to marry Luis Fernando by faking a pregnancy, but he escapes when her lie is revealed. She tries to poison María and attempts to kill her accomplice before he turns her in, but falls from the apartment and is presumed dead.

During her absence, María and Luis Fernando are married. María gives away her newborn son, Fernando, while suffering a mental disorder. She is reunited with him, now nicknamed "Nandito", fourteen years later. It is revealed that Soraya did not die, but was taken to the United States for a long recovery. Soraya marries the wealthy Oscar Montalban, then murders him for his fortune. However, to keep his estate she must remain the guardian of Oscar's daughter, the disabled Alicia, and keep her nanny Esperanza. Soraya moves back to Mexico to resume her vengeance plots against María and Luis Fernando, but falls in love with the teenaged Nandito. Infuriated when Nandito falls in love with Alicia instead, she attacks him and Esperanza, leaving Nandito near death and causing Esperanza to suffer from amnesia. Soraya murders her mother Calixta and frames Nandito, but María takes the blame and goes to prison. María is eventually declared innocent, but Soraya captures her and takes her to a wood cabin, intending to burn it down with María inside. María is rescued by Luis Fernando, and Soraya dies instead in the fire.

=== Philippine remake ===
Soraya Montenegro - The rich niece of Victoria. Soraya is deeply infatuated with Luis and is jealous of Maria. Soraya attempts to ruin Maria's life and claim Luis as her own, but fails. Soraya goes insane after her nanny Calixta, who is later revealed to be her mother, died. Soraya visits the Del La Vegas and attempts to attack them with a knife and Maria attempts to stop her but Soraya pushes Maria away, hitting the wall and knocking her unconscious. Soraya is dragged away by Fernando and is arrested and the Del La Vegas threatens to place a restraining order on Soraya if she returns. Later, Soraya gives up her wicked ways and works at a hospital and encounters Maria. Soraya takes Maria's baby and gives it to Victoria. Soraya later dies from cancer.

== Remakes and reception ==
Soraya Montenegro is remembered as an archetypical example of a telenovela villain, famous for her overacting and overreactions. She stayed popular in the 2000s as many of her scenes became internet memes, even among teenagers that never watched that soap opera. One of the most famous scenes is when she discovered Nandito kissing Alicia, and started to attack everyone.

Itatí Cantoral played Soraya again in 2016, in a commercial for the fourth season of the Orange Is the New Black series. She appears as an inmate of the prison, mistreating the other inmates. The character was modified to fit the tone of the series, and became a convicted murderer. It was rumored that Cantoral would appear in commercials for further series in Netflix, but she denied those rumors.

Actress Daniela Luján played Soraya in a recreation of the scene where she attacks Nandito, Alicia and Esperanza, at the TV program Verdad o reto. Itatí Cantoral was present in the audience, and praised Luján's work.
