= Ana Patricia Rojo =

Mexican actress and singer (born 1974)

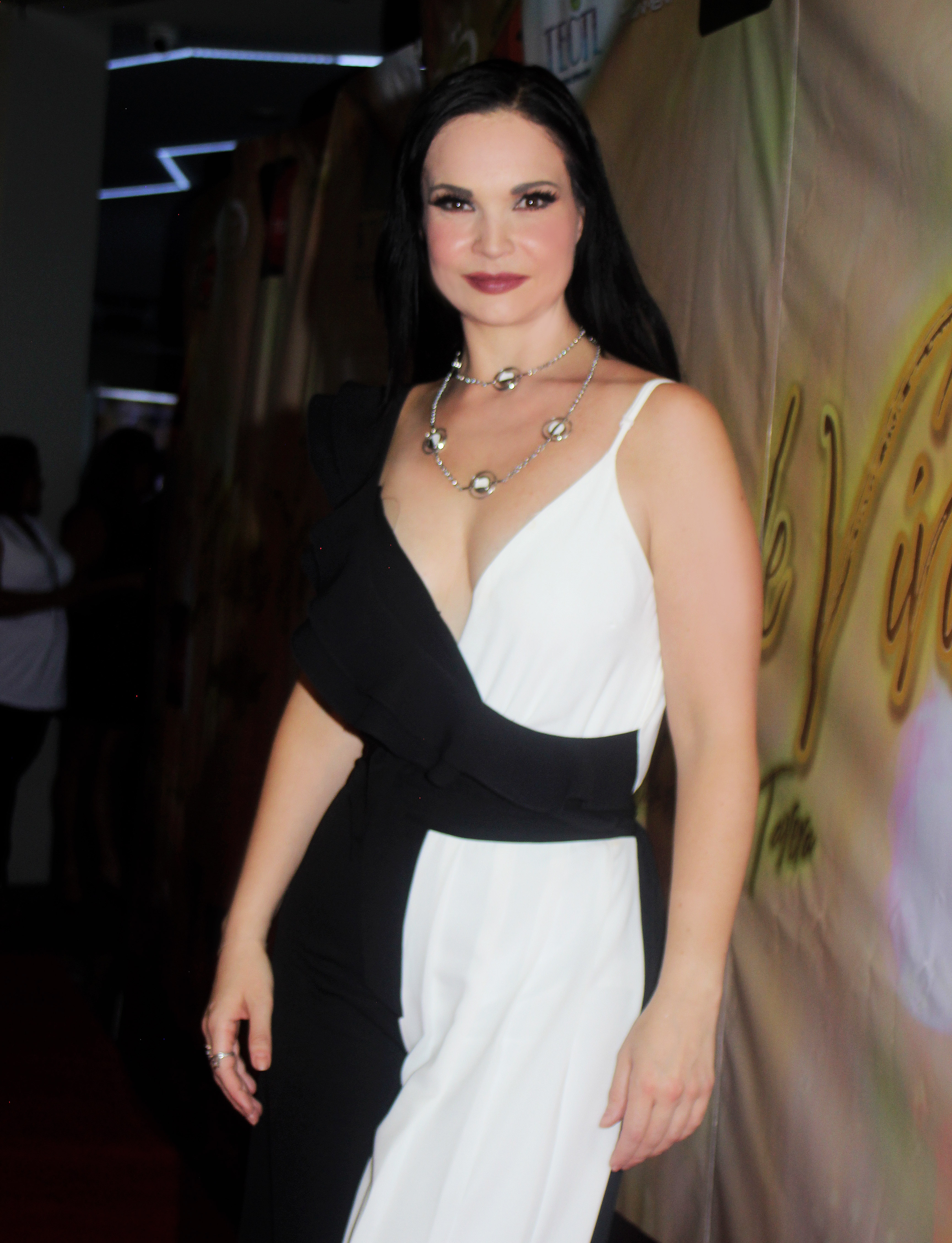
- Born: Ana Patricia Rojo Stein; February 13, 1974 (age 52); Villahermosa, Tabasco, Mexico
- Occupations: Actress, singer
- Years active: 1979–present
- Spouses: Andres Puentes Jr. (m. 2003; div. 2007) Jorge Grijalba (m. 2009; div. 2014)
- Children: Ana Sofía Grijalba (b. 2011); Ana María Grijalba (b. 2012)
- Parent(s): Gustavo Rojo; Carmela Stein
- Relatives: Alejandra Rojo (sister)

Ana Patricia Rojo Stein (born February 13, 1974) is a Mexican actress and singer.

She is famous for her participation in many telenovelas of Televisa, like María la del barrio as Penelope Linares (1995), Esmeralda as Georgina Pérez-Montalvo (1997), Destilando amor as Sofía Montalvo (2007), Cuidado con el ángel as Estefanía Rojas/Velarde (2008), as Raiza Canseco in Televisa's remake of Marimar, Corazón indomable (2013). Is the protagonist in the telenovela Mujer de Madera as Marisa Santibáñez, where replacement Edith Gonzalez (2004). Is the Main Antagonist in Un camino hacia el destino (2016). In (2019) she is part of the La Guzmán series, in which she has an important character, representing María de los Ángeles Torrieri. It is the first time that she has done a job as an actress in the Imagen Televisión chain.

== Filmography ==
=== Movies ===
Year	Title	Character	Note
2007	J-ok'el	Carmen Romero	Film
2004	La curva del olvido		Film
2000	Drogadicto		Film
1991	Dos locos en aprietos		Film
1991	Trágico carnaval		Film
1986	Como si fueramos novios	Laurita	Film
1984	No vale nada la vida		Film
1984	Veneno para las hadas	Verónica	Film
1982	Los cuates de la Rosenda		Film
1981	El robo imposible	Patty Bond	Film
1979	Los reyes del palenque		Film

=== Television ===
Year	Title	Character	Note
2025	Monteverde	Eva	Main cast
2024	Mujeres asesinas	Marina	Episode: "Esmeralda"
2023	MasterChef México Celebrity	Herself	Contestant (season 3)
2022	Amores que engañan	Edna	Episode: "Compañeros hasta la muerte"
2021-22	S.O.S me estoy enamorando	Inés Paredes Nava	Main cast
2019	La Guzmán	María de los Ángeles Torrieri	Main cast
2018	Por amar sin ley	Lina Ávalos	Guest Star
2016	Un camino hacia el destino	Mariana Altamirano	Main cast
2015	Que te perdone Dios	Efigenia de la Cruz y Ferreira	Supporting role
2014	Como dice el dicho	Angélica	Episode: "Bástele a cada día su afán"
2013	Corazón indomable	Raiza Canseco	Supporting role
2008-09	Cuidado con el ángel	Estefanía Rojas/Velarde	Main cast
2007	Destilando amor	Sofía Montalvo	Main cast
2004-05	Mujer de Madera	Marisa Santibáñez #2	Lead role
2003	Rebeca	Niurka Linares	Main cast
2001	El noveno mandamiento	Fabiola Durán	Main cast
2000	Carita de ángel	Nicole Romero Medrano	Main cast
1999	María Emilia: Querida	Mónica Pardo-Figueroa	Main cast
1998	Vivo Por Elena	Silvia Fonseca	Main cast
1997	Esmeralda	Georgina Pérez-Montalvo	Supporting role
1997	Mujer, casos de la vida real		TV series
1996	Bendita mentira	Mireya de la Mora	Main cast
1995	María José	Imperia Campuzano De la Cruz	Main cast
1995-96	María la del barrio	Penelope Linares	Supporting role
1993	Los Parientes Pobres	Griselda Olmos	Supporting role
1991	Al filo de la muerte	Mónica	Supporting role
1990	Un rostro en mi pasado	Miranda Zertuche Estrada	Supporting role
1989	Dulce desafío	Mirta	Supporting role
1983	El maleficio	Liliana	Main cast
1980	Al final del arco iris	Caramelo	Supporting role
1979	Honrarás a los tuyos	Magnolia	Guest star
