= María la del Barrio =

Mexican telenovela

- Genre: Telenovela
- Created by: Vivian Pestalozzi
- Screenplay by: Carlos Romero
- Story by: Inés Rodena
- Directed by: Beatriz Sheridan; Marta Luna
- Starring: Thalía; Fernando Colunga; David Ostrosky
- Theme music composer: Viviana Pimstein
- Opening theme: "María la del Barrio" performed by Thalía
- Composers: Emilio Estefan; Kike Santander
- Country of origin: Mexico
- Original language: Spanish
- No. of episodes: 185 (national version); 92 (international version)

Production
- Executive producer: Angelli Nesma Medina
- Producer: Valentín Pimstein
- Production locations: Mexico City, Mexico; Paris, France; Puerto Vallarta, Mexico; Brasília, Brazil; Madrid, Spain; Houston, United States
- Cinematography: Antonio Acevedo; Jesús Nájera Saro; Carlos Guerra Villareal; Alejandro Frutos
- Editor: Claudio González
- Camera setup: Multi-camera
- Production company: Televisa

Original release
- Network: Canal de las Estrellas
- Release: August 14, 1995 – April 26, 1996

Related
- Los ricos también lloran; Maria la del Barrio (2011)

María la del Barrio (Lit: Maria From the Slum/English title: Humble Maria) is a Mexican telenovela produced by Angelli Nesma Medina for Televisa in 1995. The series is based on 1979 Mexican drama series Los ricos también lloran. It stars Thalía, Fernando Colunga and Itatí Cantoral. It aired on Canal de las Estrellas from August 14, 1995 to April 26, 1996, replacing Si Dios me quita la vida and was replaced by La antorcha encendida.

It is considered the last of the unofficial Trilogía de las Marías of telenovelas starring Thalía (after María Mercedes and Marimar). María la del Barrio is considered one of the world's most popular and successful shows ever, having been broadcast in over 180 countries.

== Plot ==
María Hernández, a humble and uneducated dreamer, lives with her godmother Casilda on the outskirts of Mexico City and works as a picker of recyclable materials in a landfill. On María's 15th birthday, her godmother dies and asks Father Honorio to find a place for María to work and live. María is welcomed by Fernando De la Vega, a wealthy and influential businessman, who teaches her manners and treats her as family. However, his wife Victoria and maid Carlota despise María upon meeting her.

Luis Fernando, the eldest son of the De la Vega family, is dumped by his girlfriend Brenda and vows to avoid emotional involvement with women, choosing instead to toy with them. He initially engages with María for this purpose but ends up falling in love with her. Soraya Montenegro, Victoria's boastful and proud niece, is in love with Luis Fernando and wants to marry him. She despises María and calls her "marginal."

María gradually earns the friendship and trust of the mansion's residents and staff, including Victoria, who changes her attitude, Lupe the housekeeper, and the younger De la Vega children, Vladimir and Vanessa. Soraya exploits a drunk Luis Fernando, takes him to bed, and presents a fake pregnancy test, forcing him to marry her despite his love for María. To forget Luis Fernando, María dates Vladimir and takes etiquette classes from Doña Caro, hired by Don Fernando. Luis Fernando matures, stops drinking, and starts working at his father's company. He becomes suspicious of Soraya's pregnancy, and she then claims to have had a miscarriage.

Soraya moves into the De la Vega mansion with her nanny, Calixta, who has cared for her since childhood. Soraya frequently fights with María and wants to kill her. Calixta, who is a healer, helps Soraya by putting poisonous weeds in María's water, causing María to fall ill and be hospitalized. María discovers the cause of her illness. Calixta reveals to Soraya that she is her real mother, leading Soraya to angrily kick her out of the mansion. Soraya's lover, Osvaldo, learns of the evil plan and threatens to expose her unless she pays him. In a violent altercation, Soraya tries to kill Osvaldo but ends up falling from a window and is presumed dead. Meanwhile, Luis Fernando and María plan to marry, but a jealous Vladimir decides not to attend the wedding.

During their marriage, Luis Fernando suspects María and his brother Vladimir are lovers. When Vladimir visits the mansion to apologize for missing the wedding, Luis Fernando sees them embracing, leading to a misunderstanding and distancing himself from both. The De la Vega family temporarily moves to Spain, leaving María alone. She discovers she is pregnant and finds support from Lupe, the housekeeper. During her pregnancy, she suffers from bipolar disorder and fever. Just before giving birth, Luis Fernando files for divorce, prompting María to leave the mansion. She gives birth to a son, Fernando, in a hospital and, mentally unbalanced, wanders the streets with him. She unintentionally gives the baby to a woman named Agripina.

Luis Fernando finds María in a mental hospital and is told their son died. He adopts a baby girl named María de los Ángeles ("Tita"), Veronica's biological daughter. María searches for her lost son, leaving Tita with Luis Fernando daily. Meanwhile, Lupe hires her deceitful goddaughter Penélope to care for Tita. Penélope falls in love with Luis Fernando, and they become lovers. María discovers the affair, fires Penélope, and files for divorce. Luis Fernando apologizes, and María forgives him.

Fifteen years later, Fernando (Nando), now a lottery vendor, tries to steal money from María's house to buy medicine for his mother, Agripina, who is hospitalized. He is caught by María and Luis Fernando. Despite Nando's explanation, Luis Fernando takes him to the police. María convinces her husband to let Nando go. Later, María visits the hospital, recognizes Agripina, and learns she doesn't remember her. Concerned for Nando, María offers him a job at her house.

María supports her son Nando while hiding the truth about their relationship. Tita, now fifteen, mistakenly believes Nando is her mother's lover and tries to expose them. Penélope and her husband, José María "Papacito," who live in the same apartment as Nando, blackmail María by threatening to reveal Tita's adoption and the false affair unless they are paid. Finally, tired of Tita's misconceptions, María reveals to her that Nando is her lost son.

After María reveals to Nando that he is her son, he moves in with the De la Vega family. Luis Fernando, unaware of Nando's true identity, believes María brought her lover into their home and attempts to kill him. As he fires his gun, María screams that Nando is their son, leading to a reconciliation with her husband and reuniting Nando with his father. Penélope and José María are subsequently arrested for their crimes.

Soraya recovers from her accident and lives in Houston, Texas. She marries billionaire Oscar Montalbán, murders him, and inherits his wealth while caring for his disabled daughter, Alicia. Soraya returns to Mexico seeking revenge on María and the De la Vega family. She initially shows remorse to gain their trust, then seduces Nando, negatively influencing him and turning him against his parents.

Nando starts visiting Soraya's mansion, just to get drunk and serve as a sexual object, and eventually meets Alicia and her governess Esperanza, who advise him to stop coming and go home. María suspects Soraya is using Nando. Nando catches Soraya kissing a man named Aldo and leaves her. Soraya becomes depressed, realizing her former lover is now in love with Alicia, and forbids Alicia from seeing him.

Soraya arranges a party at her house to reconcile with Nando. During the party, Nando sneaks off to see Alicia. Soraya catches them kissing and has a psychotic episode, beats Alicia, hits Esperanza against the wall, and nearly stabs Nando to death with scissors. Alicia is saved by Aldo, and Nando is hospitalized. Esperanza and Nando are both left fighting for their lives. María reports Soraya, but she pretends to be innocent. Seeking revenge, Soraya encounters her mother, Calixta, who is now a poor beggar. When Calixta tries to approach her, Soraya pushes her, causing Calixta to hit her head and die.

Nando is initially accused of the crime, but María takes the blame and is imprisoned in a women's jail, where she meets with Penélope and a woman named Gracia. While in prison, María is humiliated and assaulted by inmates and a guard named Rosenda. After Rosenda is fired for assaulting Gracia, a fire breaks out in the prison. María saves Penélope but disappears in the flames and is presumed dead. Penélope, grateful for María's help, decides to change her life after being released. Days later, Dr. Daniel Ordóñez finds María wandering the streets with no memory and takes her in, where she becomes a nanny for his two children.

Cecilia, in love with Daniel, confronts María. When Daniel discovers Cecilia was poisoning his daughter to frame María, he throws Cecilia out of the house. After María has worked for weeks in Daniel's home, the prison director informs him that María is alive and possibly suffering from memory loss.

Nando and his father eagerly search for María in the streets but are interrupted when Agripina has a heart attack and is taken to the hospital, where they reunite with María. Meanwhile, Soraya, wanted for the murders of Oscar Montalbán and Dr. Mejia, flees from the police. She encounters María and devises a plan to kill her. Disguised as a nurse, Soraya claims to be a friend of the De la Vega family and tells María that Tita is ill, luring her to her cabin. Esperanza and Alicia observe this and contact the De la Vega family.

Agripina survives her heart attack. In the cabin, Soraya pushes María against a fireplace wall during a fight. When María awakens, she remembers everything, and a tearful Soraya confesses her crimes, going completely insane. With a pistol in hand, Soraya throws petrol around the cabin. Meanwhile, Soraya's maid reveals her location, and Luis Fernando and the police head to the cabin. Soraya, preferring death over returning to jail, throws a lit match on the ground, setting the cabin on fire.

Luis Fernando saves María from the burning cabin, and although María attempts to save her, Soraya is trapped in the flames and burns to death. Two months later, Luis Fernando and María celebrate a new, happy life with their children. Gracia, María's friend from prison, now works as a nanny to Daniel's children. Urbano and Felipa get together, and Agripina marries Veracruz. Nando dates Alicia, who undergoes surgery and is able to walk, and Tita dates Aldo. María reveals she is pregnant again.

== Cast ==
Actor	Character	Description
Thalía	María Hernández Rojas De de la Vega "María la del barrio"	Main female protagonist, goddaughter of Casilda, adoptive niece of Don Fernando, biological mother of Nandito, adoptive mother of Tita, in love with Luis Fernando, Luis Fernando's wife
Fernando Colunga	Luis Fernando de la Vega Montenegro	Main male protagonist, son of Don Fernando and Victoria, Vladimir and Vanessa's brother, ex-husband of Soraya, biological father of Nandito, adoptive father of Tita, in love with María, María's husband
Itatí Cantoral	Soraya Montenegro de la Vega / Soraya Montenegro Vda. de Montalbán	Victoria's niece, ex-wife of Luis Fernando, Oscar's widow, stepmother of Alicia, in love with Luis Fernando and biological daughter of Calixta
Irán Eory	Victoria Montenegro de la Vega	Mother of Luis Fernando, Vladimir and Vanessa, Soraya's aunt, mother-in-law of María, grandmother of Nandito, adoptive grandmother of Tita
Ricardo Blume	Don Fernando De la Vega	Husband of Victoria, father of Luis Fernando, Vladimir and Vanessa, adoptive uncle and father-in-law of María, grandfather of Nandito, adoptive grandfather of Tita
Héctor Soberón	Vladimir de la Vega Montenegro	Son of Don Fernando and Victoria, brother of Luis Fernando and Vanessa, also liked María
Meche Barba	Guadalupe "Lupe"	Housemaid of the De la Vega's, loves María like a daughter, godmother of Penélope
Silvia Caos	Calixta Popoca	Soraya's nanny and biological mother, deals with black magic
Aurora Molina	Casilda Pérez	María's godmother
Pituka de Foronda	Carolina Monroy "Seño Caro"	María's etiquette teacher
Tito Guízar	Father Honorio	Friend of Casilda
Montserrat Gallosa	Vanessa de la Vega Montenegro	Daughter of Don Fernando and Victoria, sister of Luis Fernando and Vladimir, in love with Pedro, Pedro's wife
Sebastián Garza	Pedro	Son of Rufina, friend of María, in love with Vanessa, Vanessa's husband
Rebeca Manríquez	Carlota	Servant of the De la Vega's
Beatriz Moreno	Felipa	Cook of the De la Vega's, in love with Urbano
Raúl Padilla "Chóforo"	Urbano González	Servant of the De la Vega's, in love with Fellipa
Alejandra Procuna	Brenda Ramos del Real	Luis Fernando's ex-girlfriend
Yadira Santana	Rufina	Mother of Pedro, friend of María
Carmen Salinas	Agripina Pérez	Neighbor and friend of Antonia, Veracruz and Caridad, adoptive mother of Nandito, married Veracruz
Juan Antonio Edwards	Dr. Rodrigo Suárez	Doctor of the De la Vega family
Jorge Cáceres	Osvaldo Treviño	Soraya's lover
Ana Patricia Rojo	Penélope Linares de Cano	Lupe's goddaughter, Tita's nanny, in love with Luis Fernando, Jose Maria's wife
René Muñoz	Veracruz	Neighbor and friend of Agripina, Antonia and Caridad, godfather of Nandito, married Agripina
Emilia Carranza	Raymunda del Castillo de Robles	Veronica's mother, Tita's biological grandmother
Ludwika Paleta	María de los Ángeles de la Vega Hernández "Tita"	Adoptive daughter of Luis Fernando and María, biological daughter of Clemente and Veronica, adoptive sister of Nandito, adoptive granddaughter of Don Fernando and Victoria, in love with Aldo
Osvaldo Benavides	Fernando Pérez / Fernando de la Vega Hernández "Nando / Nandito"	Lost son of María and Luis Fernando, adoptive son of Agripina, grandson of Don Fernando and Victoria, godson of Veracruz and Antonia, adoptive brother of Tita, in love with Alicia
Antonio Medellín	Dr. Carreras	Director of the psychiatric clinic
Lilia Michel	Sor Matilde	Director of the orphanage
Roberto Blandón	José María Cano "Papacito"	Penélope's husband
Jessica Jurado	Verónica Robles del Castillo de Barrena	Biological mother of "Tita", Raymunda's daughter, in love with Clemente, Clemente's wife
Ninón Sevilla	Caridad	Neighbour and friend of Agripina, Antonia and Veracruz
Claudia Ortega	Antonia	Neighbor and friend of Agripina, Caridad and Veracruz, godmother of Nandito
Manuel Saval	Oscar Montalbán	Father of Alicia, in love with Soraya, Soraya's husband
Ariadne Welter	Esperanza Calderón	Alicia's nanny
Yuliana Peniche	Alicia Montalbán Smith	Oscar's disabled daughter, stepdaughter of Soraya, in love with Nandito
Sebastián Ligarde	Lic. Gonzalo Dorantes	Old friend of Luis Fernando and Soraya, he helps Soraya with her plan for break-up Luis Fernando and Maria, in love with María
Daniel Gaurvy	Clemente Barrena	Biological father of Tita, in love with Veronica, Veronica's husband
Irlanda Mora	Grindelia Campusano "La Leona"	Prisoner and friend of Penélope
Patricia Martínez	Romelia Aguado	Prisoner and friend of Penélope
Rocío Sobrado	Gracia Valdez	Friend of Maria, become a nanny of Daniel's children
Evangelina Martínez	Berta	Prisoner and friend of Penélope
Beatriz Monroy	Tisica	Prisoner and friend of Penélope
Mauricio Aspe	Aldo Armenteros	Son of Abelardo, ex-lover of Soraya, in love with Tita
María Prado	Rosenda	Prison officer, hates María

=== Extended cast ===
Actor	Character	Description
Enrique Lizalde	Abelardo Armenteros	Lawyer of Soraya, father of Aldo
Eric del Castillo	Juez	The judge who presides over Soraya's assault trial
Arturo Muñoz	Dr. Ricardo Mejia	Soraya's accomplice who helped fake her death
Ariel López Padilla	Dr. Daniel Ordóñez	Perlita's and Carlito's father, saved María when she suffered from amnesia, in love with her
Frances Ondiviela	Cecilia	In love with Daniel
Esteban Moldovan	Carlitos Ordoñez	Son of Daniel, brother of Perlita
Natasha Dupeyrón	Perlita Ordóñez	Daughter of Daniel, sister of Carlitos
Marta Zamora	Carmen	Maid of Daniel

== Awards and nominations ==
Year	Award	Category	Nominee	Result
1996	14th TVyNovelas Awards	Best Antagonist Actress	Itatí Cantoral	Won
1996	14th TVyNovelas Awards	Best Leading Actress	Irán Eory	Nominated
1996	14th TVyNovelas Awards	Best Supporting Actress	Carmen Salinas	Nominated
1996	14th TVyNovelas Awards	Best Young Lead Actress	Ludwika Paleta	Won
1996	14th TVyNovelas Awards	Best Young Lead Actor	Osvaldo Benavides	Won
1996	14th TVyNovelas Awards	Telenovela with the Highest Rating	Angelli Nesma Medina	Won

== Remake ==
In 2011 ABS-CBN announced that Televisa had given them the permit to do a Philippine version of the series. The Philippine remake stars Erich Gonzales as the titular character with Enchong Dee as her leading man. Alicia and Nandito were not included in the Philippine remake.

== In popular culture ==
The soap opera was referenced in the 2023 movie Blue Beetle with the opening theme making a brief appearance in the movie.
