= El Conde: Amor y honor =

American TV series

- Genre: Drama
- Created by: Sandra Velasco; Alejandro Vergara
- Based on: The Count of Monte Cristo by Alexandre Dumas
- Written by: Alejandro Vergara; Laura Sosa; Magda Crisantes; Gisela Labrada; Felipe Silva; Sandra Velasco
- Directed by: Miguel Varoni; Danny Gavidia; Felipe Aguilar
- Starring: Fernando Colunga; Ana Brenda Contreras; Marjorie de Sousa; Chantal Andere; Víctor González; Sergio Sendel
- Opening theme: "Si Usted Fuera Yo" by Christian Nodal
- Composer: Enrique Díaz
- Country of origin: United States
- Original language: Spanish
- No. of seasons: 1
- No. of episodes: 75

Production
- Executive producers: Jorge Sastoque Roa; Karen Barroeta; Ximena Cantuarias; David Posada
- Cinematography: Andrés León Becker; Damián Aguilar; Juan Pablo Ambris
- Editor: Hader Antivar
- Production company: Sony Pictures Television

Original release
- Network: Telemundo
- Release: 1 July – 21 October 2024

El Conde: Amor y honor (English: The Count: Love and Honor) is an American telenovela produced by Sony Pictures Television for Telemundo. It is an adaptation of the 1844 novel The Count of Monte Cristo by Alexandre Dumas. The series stars Fernando Colunga and Ana Brenda Contreras. It aired from 1 July 2024 to 21 October 2024.

== Cast ==
=== Main ===
- Fernando Colunga as Alejandro Gaitán / Count Joaquín de Montenegro
- Ana Brenda Contreras as Mariana Zambrano
- Marjorie de Sousa as Cayetana Carrá
- Chantal Andere as Josefina de Zambrano
- Víctor González as Ricardo Sánchez
- Sergio Sendel as Gerardo Villarreal
- Sergio Reynoso as Alfredo Gallardo
- Roberto Romano as Felipe Zambrano
- Mario Loria as Rodrigo Gallardo
- Uriel del Toro as Antonio Rodríguez
- Leticia Perdigón as Adela
- Jessica Coch as Leticia de Gallardo
- Antonio Fortier as Rubén Cruz
- Begoña Narváez as Margarita
- Patricia Martínez as Lucrecia
- Magali Boysselle as Carmen
- Yany Prado as Violeta
- Enoc Leaño as Vicente García
- Alejandro Ávila as Guillermo "Memo" Garza
- Erika de la Rosa as Paulina de Zambrano
- Jason Romo as Pedro Campos
- Xabiani Ponce de León as David
- Saraí Meza as Sofía Zambrano
- Annie Cabello as Lorena Aguilar
- Job Huerta as Javier Gallardo
- Andrea Martí as Amaranta
- Ana Pau Castell as Dolores
- Luisa Galindo as Teresa
- Lu Rosette as Gabriela Villarreal

=== Guest stars ===
- Omar Fierro as Benjamín Zambrano
- Javier Díaz Dueñas as Leopoldo Villarreal
- Helena Rojo as Guadalupe de Gaitán
- Manuel Navarro as Amador Guzmán

== Production ==
=== Development ===
On 15 February 2022, the series was announced at Telemundo's virtual screening event. In May 2022, the series was presented during Telemundo's upfront for the 2022–2023 television season. Filming of the series began in June 2022 and concluded on 30 September 2022. On 26 January 2023, Telemundo released the first official trailer for the series.

=== Casting ===
On 15 February 2022, Fernando Colunga was announced as the lead role. On 26 May 2022, Ana Brenda Contreras was announced in a main role. On 28 May 2022, Marjorie de Sousa, Omar Fierro, Chantal Andere and Sergio Sendel were announced in main roles. On 13 June 2022, an extensive cast list was published in a press release.

== Episodes ==
No.	Title	Original release date
1	"Regreso del pasado"	1 July 2024
2	"Bajo la lluvia"	2 July 2024
3	"Indefenso"	3 July 2024
4	"Con el alma rota"	4 July 2024
5	"El maestro"	5 July 2024
6	"Un hombre nuevo"	8 July 2024
7	"El regreso a casa"	9 July 2024
8	"La jugada perfecta"	10 July 2024
9	"Alejandro"	11 July 2024
10	"Misteriosa celebración"	12 July 2024
11	"Golosinas para la codicia"	15 July 2024
12	"Uno menos"	16 July 2024
13	"Tu perfume"	17 July 2024
14	"Un amor que dio fruto"	19 July 2024
15	"Una nueva esposa"	22 July 2024
16	"Los planes de Mariana"	23 July 2024
17	"Un hombre peligroso"	24 July 2024
18	"Matrimonio en puertas"	25 July 2024
19	"El pasado regresa"	26 July 2024
20	"Soy yo"	29 July 2024
21	"Veneno"	30 July 2024
22	"Hay que luchar por el amor"	31 July 2024
23	"Juego sucio"	1 August 2024
24	"En busca de la verdad"	2 August 2024
25	"Una medida desesperada"	5 August 2024
26	"Un periodista valiente"	6 August 2024
27	"Aproximación peligrosa"	7 August 2024
28	"Lo que me pertenece"	8 August 2024
29	"Infiel"	9 August 2024
30	"El anzuelo"	12 August 2024
31	"Sentimientos a flor de piel"	13 August 2024
32	"Unidos por el amor"	14 August 2024
33	"El precio de la traición"	15 August 2024
34	"El dilema de Silvestre Dávalos"	16 August 2024
35	"Con el miedo en la piel"	19 August 2024
36	"Una bonita pareja"	20 August 2024
37	"La tabla de salvación"	21 August 2024
38	"El reclamo de un hijo"	23 August 2024
39	"Ofendida"	26 August 2024
40	"Soluciones radicales"	27 August 2024
41	"La historia se repite"	28 August 2024
42	"Buenas nuevas"	29 August 2024
43	"Engaño al descubierto"	30 August 2024
44	"Furia descontrolada"	2 September 2024
45	"Prisioneras"	3 September 2024
46	"Es por tu bien"	4 September 2024
47	"Víctimas de la maldad"	9 September 2024
48	"Monstruos"	11 September 2024
49	"La decisión de Sofía"	12 September 2024
50	"Una razón para luchar"	13 September 2024
51	"Bajo presión"	16 September 2024
52	"Atracción incontenible"	17 September 2024
53	"El protegido"	18 September 2024
54	"Añoranza"	19 September 2024
55	"La novia del capataz"	20 September 2024
56	"Todo cambia"	23 September 2024
57	"Despojada"	24 September 2024
58	"Un mensaje muy claro"	25 September 2024
59	"En busca de una explicación"	26 September 2024
60	"Eres tú"	27 September 2024
61	"La muerte acecha"	30 September 2024
62	"Atada por obligación"	1 October 2024
63	"Una desgracia tras otra"	2 October 2024
64	"Para siempre"	3 October 2024
65	"Es momento de pagar"	4 October 2024
66	"Depravadas"	7 October 2024
67	"Mi mujer se respeta"	8 October 2024
68	"Un altar para los enemigos"	9 October 2024
69	"Ira desenfrenada"	10 October 2024
70	"Traición imperdonable"	11 October 2024
71	"Silencio garantizado"	14 October 2024
72	"Asesino"	16 October 2024
73	"El hijo de tu enemigo"	17 October 2024
74	"Ajuste perverso"	18 October 2024
75	"Siempre hay otra oportunidad"	21 October 2024

== Reception ==
=== Ratings ===
Viewership and ratings per season of El Conde: Amor y honor
Season	Timeslot (ET)	Episodes	First aired		Last aired		Avg. viewers (millions)
Season	Timeslot (ET)	Episodes	Date	Viewers (millions)	Date	Viewers (millions)	Avg. viewers (millions)
1	Mon–Fri 10:00 p.m.	75	1 July 2024	N/A	21 October 2024	1.30	1.12

=== Awards and nominations ===
Year	Award	Category	Nominated	Result	Ref
2024	Produ Awards	Best Lead Actress - Telenovela	Ana Brenda Contreras	Nominated	
2024	Produ Awards	Best Lead Actor - Telenovela	Fernando Colunga	Nominated	
