= Frances Ondiviela =

Spanish-Mexican actress

- Born: Francisca Ondiviela Otero; May 19, 1962 (age 63); Las Palmas de Gran Canaria, Spain
- Citizenship: Spain; Mexico
- Children: Natalia Cosío Ondiviela (b. 1987) & Emiliano (b. 1995)

Francisca Ondiviela Otero (born May 19, 1962), known professionally as Frances Ondiviela, is a Spanish-Mexican actress known for starring in the telenovela Acorralada.

Ondiviela was born in Las Palmas de Gran Canaria. She studied theatre and acting in Spain and Mexico. She was Miss Spain 1980 and represented her country in Miss World 1980 and Miss Universe 1981.

== Biography ==
In 1980, at the age of 17, she became Miss Spain, and since then, having become well known, she has been part of the cast of various film, theater, and television productions.

She made her first appearance on screen in the 1982 film Jugando con la muerte (Playing with Death). A year later, she changed her name to Pat Ondiviela during her participation as a hostess on the game show Un, dos, tres... responda otra vez, filmed in Spain. During this stage of her life, she acted in several feature films, including Latidos de pánico, El Cid Cabreador, and Juana la Loca... de vez en cuando.

In the mid-1980s, he traveled to Mexico, where he studied theater, diction, voice, and radio.

In 1986, she made her debut in Carmen Armendáriz's production La hora marcada as the woman in black. She later hosted music programs and had her first role in the telenovela El pecado de Oyuki (1988-1989).

In 1989, she appeared in the telenovela Simplemente María (1989 TV series), then starred in Alcanzar una Estrella, and in 1991 in La pícara soñadora.

In 1992, she appeared in El abuelo y yo, and in 1993, she joined the cast of Entre la vida y la muerte. In 1994, she played Brenda in Marimar (Mexican TV series). In 1996, she played the antagonist Barbara in Luz Clarita.

In 2002, she played María Julia Rodríguez in the soap opera Gata salvaje.

In mid-2003, she returned to Mexico to make a special appearance in the telenovela Amor real with producer Carla Estrada and several one-off programs. In 2004, she joined the second part of Mujer de madera. In 2005, she filmed the telenovela Contra viento y marea; she worked with Silvia Pinal on the program Mujer, casos de la vida real, playing Muñeca de cristal, and her performance in this series earned her the Bravo Award for Best Actress in 2006.

In 2007, she was part of the production Acorralada, playing Octavia Irazábal.

In 2007, she played Teresa in Tormenta en el paraíso, produced by Juan Osorio. For this role, she received the Gráfica de Oro award for best actress and a nomination in the category of Best Supporting Actress at the 2009 TVyNovelas Awards, as well as the Universal Excellence Award for Tormenta en el paraíso for best actress and artistic career.

Among other performances are the different roles she played in the Mujer, Casos de la Vida Real, casos de la vida real (Woman, Real Life Cases). For her performance in this series, she won the Bravo Award for Best Actress in 2006.

Among the wide variety of awards she has received is the National Women's Award presented by the National Women's Chamber for her artistic career, which she received in 2009.

In 2009, she brought the character Rosaura Suárez to life in Emilio Larrosa telenovela Hasta que el dinero nos separe (Until Money Separates Us).

== Filmography ==
2021	Diseñando tu amor	Yolanda Platas	Recurring role
2019-2020	Médicos	Aurora Ocaranza	Guest role
2018	Las Buchonas	Magnolia	Supporting Role
2014–2015	Voltea pa' que te enamores (2014 TV series)	Pilar Amezcua	Supporting Role
2013–2014	Santa Diabla	Victoria Colleti	Main role
2013	Rosario	Teresa Martinez	Main role
2012	Un Refugio para el Amor	Julieta de Villavicencio	Recurring role
2011	Como dice el dicho	Brenda	2 episodes
2010	Llena de amor	Fedra Curiel	Guest role
2009	Hasta Que El Dinero Nos Separe	Rosaura Suarez de De la Grana	Supporting Role
2007–2008	Tormenta en el paraíso	María Teresa Andrade de Bravo	Lead role
2006	La Fea Más Bella	Diana Medina	Guest role
2005	Mujer, Casos de la Vida Real	Carmen Campuzano	
2005	Contra viento y marea	Licenciada Eva Mendoza	Guest role
2005	La Madrastra	Ella Misma	Guest role
2004	Mujer de Madera	Georgina Barrenechea	Supporting Role
2003	Amor Real	Marie De La Roquette	Guest role
2000	Siempre te amaré	Violeta Arismendi de Garrai	Recurring role
1999	Alma Rebelde	Isabela Chabela	Supporting Role
1998	Noche de paz	Chantal Pinuet	Film
1997-1998	Salud, Dinero y Amor	Adriana Rivascacho de Fontanot	Main role
1996-1997	Luz Clarita	Bárbara Lomeli	Main role
1996	María la del Barrio	Cecilia	Recurring role
1995	Bajo un mismo rostro	Melissa Papandreu	Supporting Role
1994	Marimar	Brenda Icaza	Recurring role
1993	Entre la vida y la muerte	Ivonne del Castillo	Main role
1992	El Abuelo y yo	Fernanda Rosales de Diaz-Uribe	Main role
1989-1990	Simplemente María	Natalia Preciado	Recurring role
1988	El pecado de Oyuki	Secretary	Supporting Role
