= Mujer de madera =

Mexican television series

- Poster with Edith González
- Genre: Telenovela
- Written by: Lorena Medina; Alejandro Pohlenz; Saúl Pérez
- Story by: Emilio Larrosa
- Directed by: José Dossetti; Salvador Garcini; José Ángel García
- Creative director: Ignacio Lebrija
- Starring: Edith González; Gabriel Soto; Jaime Camil; Ludwika Paleta; María Sorté; Maya Mishalska; Adamari López; Julio Alemán; Carlos Bracho; Claudio Báez; Carlos Cámara Jr.
- Theme music composer: Randy Borlow; Nicolás Tovar; Christian Castro
- Opening theme: "Mujer de madera" performed by Christian Castro
- Country of origin: Mexico
- Original language: Spanish
- No. of seasons: 1
- No. of episodes: 205

Production
- Executive producer: Emilio Larrosa
- Producer: Arturo Pedraza
- Cinematography: Gerardo Gómez; Luis Monroy
- Editors: Alfredo Frutos; Pablo Peralta; Marco Antonio Rocha
- Camera setup: Multi-camera

Original release
- Network: Canal de las Estrellas
- Release: April 26, 2004 – February 4, 2005

Mujer de Madera (English: Wooden Woman) is a Mexican telenovela, created and produced by Emilio Larrosa for Televisa in 2004.

It stars Edith González, Gabriel Soto, Jaime Camil, Ludwika Paleta, María Sorté, Maya Mishalska, Adamari López, Julio Alemán, Carlos Bracho, Claudio Báez and Carlos Cámara Jr.

González had to drop out of the telenovela due to her pregnancy and was replaced by Ana Patricia Rojo.

== Plot ==
Marisa (Edith González) was about to marry the love of her life Cesar (Jaime Camil) when the wedding was suddenly interrupted by a woman claiming to be pregnant with Cesar's baby. Distraught and heartbroken, Marisa then becomes a 'woman of wood': A woman hard to get to and who strives to continue her life alone. Cesar tries to amend his fault by marrying the mother of his daughter and tries to be happy. But he can't forget Marisa and turns to drinking. Carlos (Gabriel Soto) is an idealist fighting against illegal logging operations. Marisa and Carlos meet thanks to their common interest in discovering the truth behind the sell of illegal wood. Marisa discovers that her sister Aida (Ludwika Paleta) is in love with Carlos. Having had experience with men, Marisa decides to romance him to keep him away from her sister so she won't get hurt. Slowly but surely, the attraction between Marisa and Carlos grows and they begin to fall in love. Aida feels betrayed by her sister and the things get even more complicated when Cesar returns to Marisa's life.

Cesar's wife dies in an automobile accident and his little daughter Antonia, becomes temporarily paralyzed. Cesar decides to return to where it all started and will have to confront Marisa. Marisa is impacted with the return of Cesar; he discovers that she is a different woman but still the same one he loves. He is saddened to find out she loves Carlos and is willing to fight for her love. Piedad (Maya Mishalska) hates Marisa with a passion even though she's supposedly her aunt. She has a sick, obsessive love for Cesar and is, as Marisa will later discover, the main reason why Marisa and Cesar's wedding was interrupted. Will Marisa allow her relationship with Carlos to blossom even though her sister's heart is breaking into a million pieces? Or will Marisa forgive Cesar and give him another opportunity for him to prove if he really loves her as much as he says? But she is raped, becomes pregnant, and does not know who is the father.

Efrain (Carlos Cámara Jr.) starts an enormous fire at the ranch where Marisa is with her father. Thankfully, Cesar manages to save her before it was too late but the damage was already done. Marisa is left horribly disfigured, so much that she looks like a monster, totally unrecognizable. After several surgeries, Marisa wears a mask. After the mask is removed, Marisa looks like a complete different person. Marisa (now Ana Patricia Rojo) is even stronger and it will be harder for Carlos and Cesar to fight for her love. But after all Marisa only loves Cesar.

Carlos and Aida are happily in love. Cesar and Marisa are living a beautiful romance once again. Everything seems to be going well — so much so, that Cesar proposes once again to Marisa and she agrees. Cesar can't contain his joy as the date gets nearer, but what lies ahead is doom. Piedad is still sickly in love with him and tries one last desperate attempt to retain him at her side. Cesar becomes warned that if he married Marisa, his daughter will pay the price. The big day finally arrives. Cesar is shocked to discover that his daughter's nanny is part of Piedad's plot. If Cesar says "I do" at the altar, the nanny will inject a poisonous substance into his daughter and she would die a slow and painful death.

With all the pain in his heart, at the altar Cesar tells the priest that he does not accept Marisa as his wife. In front of the guests, Cesar tells Marisa how much he hates her and that he was only marrying her for revenge for all those years which she didn't correspond to his love. After leaving the wedding, Cesar and Antonia are kidnapped and held hostage by Piedad. Marisa is deeply emotionally hurt. Her wedding was interrupted again. Alone and sad, she is consoled by a fellow medic, Marco Antonio who falls in love with her. When Cesar is finally able to escape Piedad, he rushes to Marisa to explain what happened. Marisa believes him. But when he tries to kiss her, something pushes her away from him. Even though she loves him, a phobia has grown in her that is stronger than her. Every time she gets close to him, she remembers how he abandoned her for the second time at their wedding. Cesar is hurt and believes that she is in love with Marco Antonio.

Around this time, Piedad supposedly dies in an auto accident. After several arguments, Cesar and Marisa end their relationship and she begins dating Marco Antonio. But Marisa can't stop loving Cesar, and this makes Marco Antonio angry. Cesar meets Alondra and is immediately fascinated by her and starts a relationship with her. As much as he tries to make the relationship work, he can't forget Marisa. Alondra can tell. Cesar and Marisa beg each other for forgiveness and swear to never let anything separate them ever again. But Piedad is alive and more determined than ever to destroy Marisa and Cesar. She teams up with Marco Antonio to separate them. Will Piedad be able to separate Marisa and Cesar a third time? Will Marisa and Cesar finally be happy after all they've been through?

== Cast ==
=== Main ===
- Edith González / Ana Patricia Rojo as Marisa Santibáñez Villalpando
  - Natalia Juárez as Marisa Santibáñez in childhood
- Gabriel Soto as Carlos Gómez
- Jaime Camil as César Linares
- Ludwika Paleta as Aída Santibáñez Villalpando
- María Sorté as Celia de Gómez
- Maya Mishalska as Piedad Villalpando / Caridad Villalpando
- Adamari López as Lucrecia Santibáñez Villalpando
- Julio Alemán as Aarón Santibáñez
- Carlos Bracho as Ramiro Linares
- Claudio Báez as Benjamín Gómez
- Carlos Cámara Jr. as Efraín Gutiérrez Soto
- Lorena Tassinari as Rocío Domínguez
- Jorge Consejo as Flavio Garcini
- Lupita Lara as Lucía Ruíz
- Erika García as Andrea Gómez
- Pocholo as Felipe Calderón
- Andrea García as Alicia
- Irina Areu as Mago
- Alejandro Villeli as Cruz
- Roberto Tello as Buda
- Ricardo Barona as Sergio Portillo "El Perico"
- Michelle Ramaglia as Vicky Galván
- Silvia Ramírez as Carmen
- Mauricio Barcelata as Vicente
- Gabriela Zamora as Jennifer
- Karla Lozano as Antonia Linares
- Otto Sirgo as Leopoldo Rebollar
- Jorge Poza as Rogelio Rebollar
- Nailea Norvind as Viviana Palomares
- Roberto Blandón as Marco Antonio Yañez
- Frances Ondiviela as Georgina Barrenechea
- Adriana Laffan as Jimena
- Toño Infante as Angelo
- Juan Carlos Casasola as Heriberto
- Zoila Quiñones as Adelaida Portillo
- Gustavo Negrete as Edmundo Rivas-Cacho
- Anghel as Clarabella Portillo
- Rodolfo Velez as Maxiliano Portillo
- Mayrín Villanueva as Mariana Rodríguez
- Ricardo Silva as Ernesto
- Raúl Ochoa as Raúl
- Eduardo Cuervo as Horacio
- Elías Chiprout as Adán Barrenechea
- Claudia Troyo as Deby
- Hugo Aceves as Aldo
- Silke Ruiz as Montserrat Urrutia
- Paola Treviño as Alondra Rivas-Cacho
- Rudy Casanova as Nelson Winter "Combayo"

=== Recurring ===
- Pablo Magallanes as Valentin Calderón
- Rafael Inclán as Himself

== Production ==
=== Departure of Edith González ===
Edith González, the protagonist of the telenovela, had to drop out due to her pregnancy. Producer Emilio Larrosa searched for another actress to replace her. One possibility was to have Ludwika Paleta or Adamari López's characters as the new lead, but Larrosa decided to find a new actress. Among the actresses who were considered were Susana González, Ninel Conde and Itatí Cantoral.

On Thursday, July 1, 2004, it was announced that the actress Ana Patricia Rojo had been chosen to replace González.
