= Extraño en su pueblo =

Mexican telenovela

- Genre: Telenovela
- Written by: Celia Alcántara
- Directed by: Julio Castillo
- Country of origin: Mexico
- Original language: Spanish
- No. of episodes: 190

Production
- Executive producer: Ernesto Alonso
- Cinematography: Fernando Chacón

Original release
- Network: Canal de las Estrellas
- Release: 1974

Extraño en su pueblo (English: Stranger in the Village), is a Mexican telenovela produced by Ernesto Alonso for Televisa. Starring Rodolfo de Anda and Helena Rojo.

== Plot ==
Andrés Pereira is a man who has lived years away from his hometown San Lorenzo, learning different customs and adapting to a different lifestyle. However, when he decides to return ,he discovers that his way of life no longer fits with the villagers, and therefore will not be well received.

== Cast ==
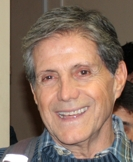
Héctor Bonilla is Jaime (The photograph of the actor of the decade of the 2010s).

Actor	Character
Rodolfo de Anda	Andrés Pereira
Helena Rojo	Isaura
Blanca Sánchez	Vanesa
José Gálvez	Gaspar
Aarón Hernán	Dr. Clarke
Héctor Bonilla	Jaime
Lucy Gallardo	Juana
Claudia Martell	Graciela
Rosalba Brambila	Luly
Sergio Jiménez	Dr. Pinheiro
Rosario Gálvez	Irene
Enzo Bellomo	Raúl Queiroz
Gladys Vivas	Estela Da Silva
Martha Patricia	Martha
Daniel Santalucía	Alberto
Fernando Rubio	Inspector
