= La Guzmán (TV series) =

- Genre: Biographical
- Written by: Verónica Bellver; Gabriela Rodríguez; Florencia Castillo; Olfa Masmoudi; Fernando Abrego; Álvaro Obregón
- Directed by: Camilo Vega; Mauricio Cruz
- Starring: Majida Issa; Carmen Madrid
- Opening theme: "Mírala, Míralo" by Alejandra Guzmán
- Countries of origin: United States; Mexico
- Original language: Spanish
- No. of seasons: 1
- No. of episodes: 59

Production
- Executive producer: Andrés Santamaría G.
- Production companies: Sony Pictures Television; Imagen Televisión

Original release
- Network: Imagen Televisión
- Release: 21 January – 11 April 2019

La Guzmán is a Spanish-language biographical television series produced by Sony Pictures Television and Imagen Televisión inspired by the life of iconic Mexican superstar Alejandra Guzmán. The series is directed by Mauricio Cruz and produced by Andrés Santamaría, and stars Majida Issa as the titular character, along with Carmen Madrid as Silvia Pinal. It premiered on 21 January 2019 and ended on 11 April 2019.

== Cast ==
=== Main ===
- Majida Issa as Alejandra Guzmán
- Erick Elías as Santiago Torrieri
- Carmen Madrid as Silvia Pinal
- Esteban Soberanes as Emilio Guzmán
- Ana Patricia Rojo as María de los Ángeles Torrieri
- Carla Carrillo as Renata
- Aleyda Gallardo as Nana Tere
- Carlos Aragón as Carlos
- Manuel Masalva as Luis Enrique Guzmán
- Salvador Amaya as Nacho Escalante
- Paula Serrano as Raquel
- Florencia Ríos as Paty
- Giuseppe Gamba
- Vicente Tamayo
- Neno Villegas
- Roberto Mateos as Lienzo
- Vanessa Ciangherotti as Desiree
- Elsa Jaimes as Olga

=== Recurring ===
- Paloma Ruiz de Alda as Cynthia
- Sofía Garza

== Ratings ==
Viewership and ratings per season of La Guzmán
Season	Episodes	First aired		Last aired		Avg. viewers (millions)
Season	Episodes	Date	Viewers (millions)	Date	Viewers (millions)	Avg. viewers (millions)
1	59	21 January 2019	0.82	11 April 2019	0.65	0.66

== Episodes ==
No.	Title	Original release date	Mexico viewers (millions)
1	"Déjame vivir mi vida"	21 January 2019	0.82
2	"Ser cruel para ser bondadoso"	22 January 2019	0.70
3	"El adiós"	23 January 2019	0.76
4	"Brindemos por el amor incondicional"	24 January 2018	0.78
5	"Demonio de Tazmania"	25 January 2019	0.70
6	"Tú eres mi rockstar"	28 January 2019	0.67
7	"Bye mamá"	29 January 2019	0.66
8	"La noto muy diferente"	30 January 2019	0.65
9	"Él es el amor de mi vida"	31 January 2018	0.74
10	"Quiero ser independiente"	1 February 2019	0.54
11	"Soy Alejandra Guzmán"	4 February 2019	0.65
12	"El primer disco"	5 February 2019	0.78
13	"No quiero herirla"	6 February 2019	0.76
14	"Ha nacido una estrella"	7 February 2019	0.85
15	"Luz de luna"	8 February 2019	0.79
16	"Llama por favor"	11 February 2019	0.63
17	"Posesiva, lunar y celosa"	12 February 2019	0.68
18	"Revelación"	13 February 2019	0.69
19	"Gira por Centroamérica"	14 February 2019	0.71
20	"Eternamente bella"	15 February 2019	0.54
21	"Hasta el final"	18 February 2019	0.54
22	"Acapulco"	19 February 2019	0.78
23	"Celos"	20 February 2019	0.67
24	"Siempre tú"	21 February 2019	0.65
25	"La traición"	22 February 2019	0.75
26	"Alta traición"	25 February 2019	0.78
27	"Larga distancia de ansiedad"	26 February 2019	0.73
28	"Libre"	27 February 2019	0.73
29	"Hacer el amor con otro"	28 February 2019	0.81
30	"Quiero que despiertes"	1 March 2019	0.55
31	"El primer paso"	4 March 2019	0.52
32	"El amor es el motivo"	5 March 2019	0.74
33	"Una nueva vida"	6 March 2019	0.69
34	"Una familia"	7 March 2019	0.77
35	"Se llamará Frida Sofía"	8 March 2019	0.68
36	"Consejo de madre"	11 March 2019	0.58
37	"Embarazo complicado"	12 March 2019	0.62
38	"El nacimiento de Frida Sofía"	13 March 2019	0.58
39	"Angustia maternal"	14 March 2019	0.67
40	"Nuevo productor musical"	15 March 2019	0.60
41	"Bautizo francés"	18 March 2019	0.64
42	"Medidas preventivas"	19 March 2019	0.60
43	"Libre para triunfar"	20 March 2019	0.56
44	"Regreso afortunado"	21 March 2019	0.63
45	"Eres padre y madre"	22 March 2019	0.65
46	"Afortunada resaca"	25 March 2019	0.46
47	"Tentación irresistible"	26 March 2019	0.53
48	"La Guzmán"	27 March 2019	0.58
49	"Bajo la tormenta"	28 March 2019	0.70
50	"Intento de extorsión"	29 March 2019	0.61
51	"Demasiada presión"	1 April 2019	0.65
52	"Tiempo de crecer"	2 April 2019	0.59
53	"A Miami"	3 April 2019	0.59
54	"Triunfo máximo"	4 April 2019	0.44
55	"Vivir requiere de valor"	5 April 2019	0.51
56	"Vencer a la muerte"	8 April 2019	0.53
57	"Veneno en la sangre"	9 April 2019	0.60
58	"Despedida con gratitud"	10 April 2019	0.57
59	"Ave fénix"	11 April 2019	0.65
