= Dulce desafío =

Mexican telenovela

- DVD cover of Dulce Desafío
- Genre: Telenovela; Romance; Drama
- Created by: Jorge Patiño
- Written by: Jorge Patiño
- Directed by: Arturo Ripstein
- Starring: Adela Noriega; Eduardo Yáñez; Enrique Lizalde; Sergio Klainer; Mercedes Olea; Olivia Collins; Beatriz Aguirre
- Theme music composer: Guillermo Méndez Guiú
- Country of origin: Mexico
- Original language: Spanish
- No. of episodes: 100

Production
- Executive producers: Julissa; Eugenio Cobo
- Cinematography: Alejandro Frutos
- Production company: Televisa

Original release
- Network: Canal de las Estrellas
- Release: November 28, 1988 – April 14, 1989

Related
- Locura de amor (2000)

Dulce desafío (English title: Sweet challenge) is a Mexican telenovela produced by Julissa and Eugenio Cobo for Televisa in 1988.

Adela Noriega and Eduardo Yáñez starred as protagonists, while Chantal Andere, Sergio Klainer and Mercedes Olea starred as antagonists. Enrique Lizalde starred as stellar performance.

== Plot ==
The story starts with Lucero Sandoval, a sixteen-year-old girl who lives with her father, Santiago Sandoval and her sister, Beatriz. Lucero's mother died when she was very little and that void shows through her rebellious behaviour. Her father decides to send her to a strict boarding school for problematic girls. The director of the school, Luis Mancera abuses his authority by making life impossible for the students of the school. Lucero becomes the heroine of the boarding school where she studies.

== Cast of Characters ==
Main cast

- Adela Noriega as Lucero Sandoval Barbosa
- Eduardo Yáñez as Enrique Toledo

Supporting cast

- Enrique Lizalde as Santiago Sandoval
- Sergio Klainer as Luis Mancera
- Mercedes Olea as Micaela Tellez
- Olivia Collins as Rosario Quintana
- Beatriz Aguirre as Doña Esther Sandoval
- Juan Carlos Serran as Federico Higuera
- Chantal Andere as Rebeca Centeno
- Ginny Hoffman as Marcela Zedena
- Rosa Furman as Doña Rosa
- Fefi Mauri as Toña
- Ana Patricia Rojo as Mirta Miranda
- Alberto Estrella as Ernesto Quiroz
- Armando Araiza as Francisco "Paco" Fernández
- Juan Carlos Bonet as Botho Arguedas
- Katia del Río as Angela Castro
- Angélica Rivera as María Inés
- Antonio Escobar as Sebastián
- Amairani as Rocío
- Celina del Villar as Carmen Ruelas
- Angélica Ruvalcaba as Luisa
- Paola Ochoa as Aracely Otero
- Mauricio Ferrari as Álvaro Ruelas
- Evangelina Martínez as Estela Sánchez
- Estela Barona as Verónica
- Martha Escobar as Fernanda Ojeda
- Ana Urquidi as Beatriz Sandoval

== Soundtrack ==
- Timbiriche – "Vive la Vida"
- Timbiriche – "Basta Ya"
- Timbiriche – "No Sé Si Es Amor"
- Timbiriche – "Paranoia"
- Timbiriche – "Todo Cambia"
- Timbiriche – "Tú y Yo Somos Uno Mismo"
- Timbiriche – "Ámame Hasta con los Dientes"
- Sasha Sokol – "La Leyenda"
- James Ingram – "Just Once"
- Krokus – "Our Love (Will Never Die)"
- Bonnie Tyler – "If You Were a Woman (And I Was a Man)"
- Billy Idol – "Rebel Yell"
- Gino Vannelli – "Hurts to Be in Love"

== Awards ==
Year	Award	Category	Nominee	Result
1990	8th TVyNovelas Awards	Best Telenovela of the Year	Julissa; Eugenio Cobo	Nominated
1990	8th TVyNovelas Awards	Best Antagonist Actor	Sergio Klainer	Nominated
1990	8th TVyNovelas Awards	Best Young Lead Actress	Adela Noriega	Won
1990	8th TVyNovelas Awards	Best Young Lead Actor	Eduardo Yáñez	Won
1990	8th TVyNovelas Awards	Best Female Revelation	Chantal Andere	Nominated
1990	8th TVyNovelas Awards	Best Debut Actress	Chantal Andere	Won
1990	8th TVyNovelas Awards	Best Direction of the Cameras	Alejandro Frutos	Won
