= Maya Mishalska =

Mexican actress

- Born: Miroslawa Maja Miszalska Harasymowicz; December 8, 1971 (age 54); Warsaw, Poland
- Occupations: Actress, violinist, TV presenter
- Years active: 1989-present

Maya Mishalska (born Miroslawa Maja Miszalska Harasymowicz on December 8, 1971, in Warsaw, Poland) is a Polish-born Mexican actress, violinist and TV presenter.

== Biography ==
She began playing the violin at the age of six. Through ten years of studies at the Music Conservatory, she looked for an opportunity to experiment in theatre. Her passion for acting surged after participating in a play by Federico Garcia Lorca.

A few years later, she arrived in Mexico City to begin acting studies. After enrolling in Televisa's Centro de Estudios Artisticos (CEA), her talent and beauty was noticed by producers. From that moment on, she has been busy appearing in various telenovelas, plays and films.

She speaks five languages: Polish, Spanish, French, English and a little Russian.

== Filmography ==
Year	Title	Role	Notes
1990	Destino	Odette Villatoro	Supporting role
1991	El jugador	French Girl	Film
1992	El abuelo y yo	Leticia	Supporting role
1994	Papá soltero	Elisa	5 Episodes
1994	Al derecho y al derbez		
1994	Novia que te vea	Rebeca "Rifke" Groman	Film
1994	La reina de la noche	Women	Film
1996	La sombra del otro	Bernardina del Castillo de Madrigal	Supporting role
1996	Concierto de Andrea Bocelli en San Juan de Ulúa	Herself/Presenter	Special Programs
1997	Huracán	Thelma Villarreal de Vargaslugo	Main cast
1997	Un baúl lleno de miedo	Emilia	Film
1998	Cilantro y perejil	Vicky	Film
1999	Amor Gitano	Astrid de Marnier, Countess de Marnier, Countess vda. de Minelli	Main cast
1999-00	Tres mujeres	Paulina	Supporting role
2000-03	Mujer, Casos de la Vida Real	Mirna	2 Episodes
2001	María Belén	Úrsula Araña	Main cast
2003	Amor Real	Marianne Bernier de la Roquette/Marie de la Roquette Fuentes Guerra	Main cast
2004-05	Mujer de Madera	Piedad Villalpando/Caridad Villalpando	Main cast
2005	100 Mexicanos Dijeron	Herself	TV Game Show
2007-08	Pasión	Úrsula Mancera y Ruiz Mendoza	Main cast
2008-09	Cuidado con el ángel	Blanca Silva de Contreras/Ivette Dorleaque	Recurring role
2011	Dos Hogares	Pamela Ramos	Recurring role
2012	Cachito de Cielo	Lucifer "Lucy"	Recurring role
2013	Corazón Indomable	Carmela	Recurring role
2014	Calakmul un tesoro para México un legado para la humanidad	Herself/Presenter	Special Programs
2014-15	Yo no creo en los hombres	Vera Duval	Guest star
2015-16	A que no me dejas	Maite	Recurring role
2017	Mi adorable maldición	Elsa Solana viuda de Villavicencio	Main cast
2023	Golpe de suerte	Constanza	

== Theater ==
- Aladino, el musical
- Pedro y el lobo (Sergei Prokofiev)
- Un hogar sólido (Elena Garro)
- La dama del alba (Alejandro Casona)
- Bodas de Sangre (Federico García Lorca)
- Blithe Spirit (Noël Coward)
- Las tres hermanas (Anton Chekhov)
- El retablo jovial (Alejandro Casona)
- Honor (Joanna Murray-Smith)
- Sueño De Una Noche Con Sabines - 2012 (Ignacio Lopez Tarso)
- Tick, Tack...Boom - 2014 (Sabina Berman)

== Awards and nominations ==
=== Premios TVyNovelas ===
Year	Category	Telenovela	Result
2005	Best Female Antagonist	Mujer de Madera	Nominated

Other Awards
Year	Category	Result
1994	Premio Ariel for Best Actress	Nominated
1995	Special Mention Chicago Press	Won
1998	Premios Diosa de Plata for Best Supporting Actress	Won
1999	Award of the Association of Theatre Critics for Revelation of the Year	Won
2003	Sol de Oro National Circle of Journalists	Won
2005	Golden Laurel Quality Mexico to Spain	Won
2006	Golden Laurel Quality Mexico to Spain	Won
2008	Sol de Oro National Circle of Journalists for Brilliant Artistic Career	Won
2008	Gold Chart Latin American Association of Professional Newspapers, Radio and TV for Best Performance in the Telenovela Pasión	Won
2014	Award for Excellence from the National Chamber of Women	Won
