= Amor real =

Mexican telenovela

- DVD cover of Amor real
- Genre: Telenovela
- Created by: María Zarattini
- Based on: Bodas de odio by Caridad Bravo Adams
- Written by: Víctor Manuel Medina
- Directed by: Eric Morales; Mónica Miguel
- Starring: Adela Noriega; Fernando Colunga; Mauricio Islas; Helena Rojo
- Music by: Jorge Avendaño
- Opening theme: "Amor real" by Sin Bandera
- Country of origin: Mexico
- Original language: Spanish
- No. of episodes: 95

Production
- Executive producer: Carla Estrada
- Producer: Arturo Lorca
- Cinematography: Jesús Acuña Lee; Alejandro Frutos
- Editors: Juan Franco; Luis Horacio Valdés
- Production company: Televisa

Original release
- Network: Canal de las Estrellas
- Release: June 9 – October 17, 2003

Related
- Bodas de odio; Lo que la vida me robó

Amor real (English: Real Love) (Note: Also dubbed as Royal Love in English.) is a Mexican telenovela produced by Carla Estrada for Televisa, broadcast by Canal de las Estrellas (now known simply as Las Estrellas). It originally aired from June 9 to October 17, 2003. Amor real is a historical drama set in the Mexican post-independence period of the mid-19th century. The telenovela aired on Univision in the United States, on REN TV in Russia and on La 1 in Spain, among others. It was successfully distributed to many countries worldwide. In 2005, Amor real was released on DVD and it became the first telenovela have English subtitles. Televisa has released an abridged DVD version of the telenovela in several countries.

The cast and crew of the telenovela received many accolades, including the TVyNovelas Award for Best Telenovela of the Year at the 2004 TVyNovelas Awards ceremony.

== Overview ==
In the mid-19th century, in a time of Victorian morality, challenging the rules of the aristocracy to which she belongs, Matilde Peñalver y Beristáin (Adela Noriega) falls in love with Adolfo Solís (Mauricio Islas), an army soldier with no fortune, trusting that her father, Hilario (Ricardo Blume) – a fair and kind man – will let her marry him. But her mother, Augusta (Helena Rojo), is determined to force Matilde to marry a rich man to save the family from bankruptcy. Manuel Fuentes Guerra (Fernando Colunga) is the perfect candidate. He is an honourable and handsome young man who has just inherited a vast fortune. Augusta ignores the fact that Manuel is the illegitimate son of Joaquín Fuentes Guerra (Julio Alemán), a powerful landlord who raped a native girl, and who only recognised Manuel as his heir on his deathbed.

Using all kinds of intrigues, Augusta and her son, Humberto (Ernesto Laguardia) send Adolfo to prison and convince Matilde that he is married and has children. Overwhelmed and in despair, Matilde surrenders to her mother's pressure and agrees to marry Manuel, especially after she learns that he has paid the family's debts. Adolfo escapes from jail and immediately goes to look for his beloved Matilde, who has just married Manuel. Desperate, Adolfo manages to secretly speak with Matilde to clarify the misunderstandings. Swearing they will love each other forever, they decide to run away, but Manuel discovers them. Deeply hurt, Manuel is not willing to give her up. He forces her to leave with him, despite her love for Adolfo. After arriving at Manuel's hacienda, Matilde has to put up with Antonia (Chantal Andere), the former administrator's daughter, who is in love with Manuel.

Meanwhile, Adolfo, after an intense and frantic search finds Matilde and, intending to bring her back, poses as Manuel's new administrator. Manuel, unaware of Adolfo's real identity, gets along with him giving him a special, friendly treatment. In spite of the situation, Adolfo has to admit that Manuel is a noble, fair man. At that point, Manuel and Matilde discover that they have been victims of Augusta and Humberto's deceit. As time goes by, the subtle attention and Manuel's avid desire end up conquering Matilde's heart. Suddenly one day, she realises that the love she felt for Adolfo has disappeared and that she's fallen in love with Manuel. Matilde tells Adolfo the truth and urges him to leave.

Heartbroken, Adolfo accepts the situation and leaves the hacienda at the same day as Matilde announces to her husband that she's pregnant. The couple's happiness does not last long, however, since Manuel discovers who his new administrator was and, in an instant, everything falls apart. Matilde's pleas and explanations cannot convince Manuel, he feels betrayed once again and cannot forgive her. Driven by anger, Manuel doubts his paternity and throws Matilde out of the hacienda. Soon after that, he starts a compromising relationship with Antonia that will later make his reconciliation with Matilde more difficult. Manuel and Matilde's relationship will suffer and prosper during times of civil unrest, political and societal intrigue, and subterfuge. Only time will tell whether or not they find Real Love with each other or with someone new.

== Cast ==
=== Main cast ===
- Adela Noriega as Matilde
- Fernando Colunga as Manuel
- Mauricio Islas as Adolfο
- Helena Rojo as Augusta

=== Supporting cast ===
- Ernesto Laguardia as Humberto
- Ana Martín as Rosario
- Mariana Levy as Josefina
- Chantal Andere as Antonia
- Mauricio Herrera as Urbano
- Ana Bertha Espín as Prudencia
- Rafael Rojas as Amadeo Corona
- Mario Iván Martínez as Renato
- Leticia Calderón as Hannah
- Julio Alemán as Joaquín
- Ricardo Blume as Hilario
- Yolanda Mérida as Doña Juana
- Maya Mishalska as Marianne
- Matty Huitrón as Chief Nun
- Raquel Morell as María Clara
- Gastón Tuset as Gervasio
- Óscar Bonfiglio as Sixto
- Harry Geithner as Yves
- Manuel "Flaco" Ibáñez as Remigio
- Paco Ibáñez as Gregorio
- Toño Infante as Benigno
- Luis Xavier as José María
- Adalberto Parra as Delfino
- Héctor Sáez as Silvano
- Kika Edgar as Catalina
- Íngrid Martz as Pilar
- Jorge Vargas as Prisco
- Beatriz Sheridan as Damiana
- Carlos Cámara as Ramón

=== Guest stars ===
- Carlos Ache as Graciano
- Lorena Álvarez as Bernarda
- Carlos Amador as Orlando Cordero
- Olivia Bucio as Singer
- July Calderón as Micaela
- Dulcina Carballo as Jacinta
- René Casados as Juggler
- Albert Chávez as Pancho
- Paulina de Labra as Ignacia
- Alicia del Lago as Higinia
- Mayahuel del Monte as Ceferina
- Mario del Río as Lorenzo Rojas
- Alejandro Felipe as Manuelito
- José Antonio Ferral as Benítez
- Miguel Ángel Fuentes as El Negro
- David Galindo as Nazario
- Raquel Garza as Woman
- Joseba Iñaki as Jacobo Negrete
- Gerardo Klein as Santiago López
- Fernando Manzano as Garza
- Sara Monar as Ana
- María Dolores Oliva as Lázara
- Frances Ondiviela as Marie de la Roquette
- Benjamín Pineda as Canales
- Adal Ramones as Circus owner
- María Sorté as Rosaura
- Fátima Torre as María Fernanda
- Tanya Vázquez as Adelaida
- Alejandro Villeli as Ezequiel
- Jacqueline Voltaire as Nun

== Production ==
"The work of our extremely dedicated cast and crew, along with the extraordinary collection of visual elements — lighting, camera work, custom-made wardrobe, attention to detail — allows the viewers to experience the characters' emotions and also transport themselves completely to another era."

— Carla Estrada
- Amor real is an adaptation of the telenovela Bodas de odio, produced in 1983 and based on the novel of the same name by Caridad Bravo Adams. This version, as well as the former one, was adapted by Italian screenwriter María Zarattini.
- The telenovela was filmed at the ex-hacienda of Tetlapayac and the surrounding area in the state of Hidalgo for a lapse of eight months. Because the story takes place in mid-19th century Mexico, sets of buildings and plazas had to be built.
- The production required the participation of over 1,000 actors, extras, technicians, and artisans.
- Jorge Avendaño, Mexican pianist and composer, composed the original score (incidental music).
- The opening theme, "Amor real", was written and performed by the Mexico-based duo Sin Bandera.

== Reception ==
=== Mexico's television ratings ===
Timeslot	# Ep.	Premiere		Finale		Rank	Season	Rating average
Timeslot	# Ep.	Date	Premiere Rating	Date	Finale Rating	Rank	Season	Rating average
Mondays—Fridays; 9:00 pm	95	June 9, 2003	26.5	October 17, 2003	43.1	No. 1	2003–04	29.4

During its broadcast in Mexico, the telenovela registered very high ratings, especially in its last weeks on air, when it reached an average of 35 rating points. It remained in first place throughout its five-month run in Mexico. with a 60% market share, as reported by Ibope Mexico. Due to the show's great popularity, the complete telenovela was re-broadcast for a second time after a public request, four months after its original broadcast ended.

=== International success ===
Aside from its success in Mexico and Latin America, Amor real was also successful internationally. When the telenovela aired in prime time on Univision, it frequently managed to beat leading U.S. networks in rating numbers. The series aired in the U.S. with no subtitles; however it ranks among Univision's highest rated telenovelas of all time. The telenovela also had successful results when it aired on Spanish national television by TVE, where it was programmd in the afternoons during 2005. In 2005, Amor real was released on DVD and it was the first telenovela to have English subtitles. The DVD release had very successful sales in the U.S. The international DVD release of the telenovela also included countries such as Canada, Puerto Rico, France, Italy, and Spain.

== Awards and nominations ==
Below is a listing of the most important awards and nominations received by the production:

Year	Award	Category	Nominee	Result
2003	Arlequin Awards	Best Production	Carla Estrada	Won
2003	Arlequin Awards	Best Actress	Adela Noriega	Won
2003	Arlequin Awards	Best Actor	Mauricio Islas	Won
2003	Califa de Oro Awards	Best Telenovela	Amor real	Won
2003	Califa de Oro Awards	Outstanding Performance	Adela Noriega	Won
2003	Califa de Oro Awards	Outstanding Performance	Ana Bertha Espín	Won
2003	Califa de Oro Awards	Outstanding Performance	Ana Martín	Won
2003	Califa de Oro Awards	Outstanding Performance	Beatriz Sheridan	Won
2003	Califa de Oro Awards	Outstanding Performance	Chantal Andere	Won
2003	Califa de Oro Awards	Outstanding Performance	Ernesto Laguardia	Won
2003	Califa de Oro Awards	Outstanding Performance	Fernando Colunga	Won
2003	Califa de Oro Awards	Outstanding Performance	Mariana Levy	Won
2003	Califa de Oro Awards	Outstanding Performance	Mario Iván Martínez	Won
2003	Califa de Oro Awards	Outstanding Performance	Mauricio Islas	Won
2003	Califa de Oro Awards	Outstanding Performance	Rafael Rojas	Won
2003	Califa de Oro Awards	Lifetime Artistic Achievement; Award as a Screenwriter	María Zarattini	Won
2003	Califa de Oro Awards	Best Direction of the Cameras	Alejandro Frutos	Won
2003	Califa de Oro Awards	Best Direction	Mónica Miguel	Won
2003	Califa de Oro Awards	Outstanding Production	Carla Estrada	Won
2003	Mexico's National Association of Broadcasters (Micrófono de Oro Awards)	Outstanding Achievement as Executive Producer	Carla Estrada	Won
2003	Mexico's National Association of Journalists (Sol de Oro Awards) (Note: Amor real won 25 Sol de Oro Awards that are bestowed by Mexico's National Association of Journalists; actually winning in all categories.)	Best Production	Carla Estrada	Won
2003	Mexico's National Association of Journalists (Sol de Oro Awards)	Best Actress	Adela Noriega	Won
2003	Mexico's National Association of Journalists (Sol de Oro Awards)	Best Actor	Fernando Colunga	Won
2003	Mexico's National Association of Journalists (Sol de Oro Awards)	Best Antagonist Actress	Chantal Andere	Won
2003	Mexico's National Association of Journalists (Sol de Oro Awards)	Best Antagonist Actor	Mauricio Islas	Won
2003	Mexico's National Association of Journalists (Sol de Oro Awards)	Best Leading Actress	Helena Rojo	Won
2003	Mexico's National Association of Journalists (Sol de Oro Awards)	Best Leading Actor	Ricardo Blume	Won
2003	Mexico's National Association of Journalists (Sol de Oro Awards)	Best Co-lead Actress	Mariana Levy	Won
2003	Mexico's National Association of Journalists (Sol de Oro Awards)	Best Co-lead Actor	Ernesto Laguardia	Won
2003	Mexico's National Association of Journalists (Sol de Oro Awards)	Best Supporting Actress	Ana Bertha Espín	Won
2003	Mexico's National Association of Journalists (Sol de Oro Awards)	Best Supporting Actor	Mario Iván Martínez	Won
2003	Mexico's National Association of Journalists (Sol de Oro Awards)	Best Female Guest Star	Maya Mishalska	Won
2003	Mexico's National Association of Journalists (Sol de Oro Awards)	Best Male Guest Star	Rafael Rojas	Won
2003	Mexico's National Association of Journalists (Sol de Oro Awards)	Lifetime Artistic Achievement; Award as an Actress	Matty Huitrón	Won
2003	Mexico's National Association of Journalists (Sol de Oro Awards)	Lifetime Artistic Achievement; Award as an Actor	Mauricio Herrera	Won
2003	Mexico's National Association of Journalists (Sol de Oro Awards)	Best Direction	Mónica Miguel	Won
2003	Mexico's National Association of Journalists (Sol de Oro Awards)	Best Adaptation	María Zarattini	Won
2003	TV Adicto Golden Awards	Best Set Design and Props	Amor real	Won
2003	TV Adicto Golden Awards	Best Costumes	Amor real	Won
2003	TV Adicto Golden Awards	Best Return	Ana Martín	Won
2003	TV Adicto Golden Awards	Best Actress in a Supporting Role	Mariana Levy	Won
2003	TV Adicto Golden Awards	Best Female Villain	Helena Rojo, Chantal Andere, Maya Mishalska, or Beatriz Sheridan	Won
2003	TV Adicto Golden Awards	Special Award for Excellence to a Mature Female Actress	Yolanda Mérida	Won
2003	TV Adicto Golden Awards	Best Leading Actor	Ricardo Blume	Won
2003	TV Adicto Golden Awards	Best Female Lead	Adela Noriega	Won
2003	TV Adicto Golden Awards	Best Couple	Adela Noriega; Fernando Colunga	Won
2003	TV Adicto Golden Awards	Best Adaptation	María Zarattini	Won
2003	TV Adicto Golden Awards	Best Locations	Amor real	Won
2003	TV Adicto Golden Awards	Best Direction of the Cameras	Amor real	Won
2003	TV Adicto Golden Awards	Best Direction	Amor real	Won
2003	TV Adicto Golden Awards	Best Production	Amor real	Won
2003	TV Adicto Golden Awards	Best Telenovela by Televisa	Amor real	Won
2003	TV Adicto Golden Awards	Special Award for Great; Telenovela of the Year	Amor real	Won
2004	TVyNovelas Awards	Best Telenovela	Carla Estrada	Won
2004	TVyNovelas Awards	Best Actress	Adela Noriega	Won
2004	TVyNovelas Awards	Best Actor	Fernando Colunga	Won
2004	TVyNovelas Awards	Best Antagonist Actress	Chantal Andere	Nominated
2004	TVyNovelas Awards	Best Leading Actress	Ana Martín	Won
2004	TVyNovelas Awards	Best Leading Actor	Carlos Cámara	Won
2004	TVyNovelas Awards	Best Co-lead Actress	Ana Bertha Espín	Won
2004	TVyNovelas Awards	Best Co-lead Actor	Ernesto Laguardia	Won
2004	TVyNovelas Awards	Best Musical Theme	"Amor real" by Sin Bandera	Nominated
2004	TVyNovelas Awards	Best Original Story or Adaptation	María Zarattini	Won
2004	TVyNovelas Awards	Special Award for Telenovela with the Highest Rating in 2003	Amor real	Won
2004	Bravo Awards	Best Telenovela	Carla Estrada	Won
2004	Bravo Awards	Best Actress	Adela Noriega	Won
2004	Bravo Awards	Best Actor	Fernando Colunga	Won
2004	Bravo Awards	Best Generic Leading Actress	Helena Rojo	Won
2004	Bravo Awards	Best Generic Leading Actor	Ricardo Blume	Won
2004	Bravo Awards	Best Adaptation	María Zarattini	Won
2004	Laurel de Oro Awards	Best Telenovela	Carla Estrada	Won
2004	Laurel de Oro Awards	Best Actress	Adela Noriega	Won
2004	Laurel de Oro Awards	Best Actor	Fernando Colunga	Won
2004	Laurel de Oro Awards	Best Supporting Actress	Helena Rojo	Won
2004	Laurel de Oro Awards	Best Supporting Actor	Mario Iván Martínez	Won
2004	Laurel de Oro Awards	Lifetime Artistic; Achievement Award	Ana Martín	Won
2004	Laurel de Oro Awards	Lifetime Artistic; Achievement Award	Mauricio Herrera	Won
2004	100 Mexicanos Dijeron	VIP Award	Amor real	Won
2004	Principios Award	Special Award	Amor real	Won
2004	Universidad Autónoma Metropolitana	Special Award	Amor real	Won
2005	Latin ACE Awards	Best Scenic Program	Amor real	Won
2005	Latin ACE Awards	Best Actress	Adela Noriega	Nominated
2005	Latin ACE Awards	Best Actor	Fernando Colunga	Won
2005	Latin ACE Awards	Best Supporting Actor	Ernesto Laguardia	Won
2005	Latin ACE Awards	Most Outstanding Character Actress	Ana Martín	Won
2005	Latin ACE Awards	Best Direction	Mónica Miguel	Won
2005	Plaza de las Estrellas	Luminaria de Oro	Amor real	Won
2005	Plaza de las Estrellas	Luminaria de Oro	Carla Estrada	Won
2005	Las Garzas International Film Festival	Special Accolade	Amor real	Won
2010	Golden Awards Of The Decade	Best Actress in a Supporting Role	Mariana Levy	Won
