= Yolanda Mérida =

Mexican actress (1929–2012)

Yolanda Mérida (20 August 1929 – 11 April 2012) was a Mexican actress known for her work in theater and television. Her last role was that of Manuela in Cuando Me Enamoro.

== Biography ==
Mérida was born Yolanda Noemí Alpuche Morales in Mérida, Yucatán, Mexico. She adopted the stage name, Yolanda Mérida, after the city in which she was born. She married Manuel Pérez Ferreiro, a Spaniard, and had two children, Mary Carmen and Manolo.

She began acting in 1951 when she appeared onstage in Los empeños de una casa. She expanded to Mexican soap operas and telenovelas during the mid-1950s, including Fernando Soler y sus comediantes and Teatro bon soir. She remained active in television from the 1950s until her death in 2012. Other telenovela credits included Los Ricos También Lloran, Bodas de odio, Amor real and most recently, Cuando Me Enamoro in 2011.

Also, Yolanda Mérida was voice-over artist for a long time, she began working as a dubbing actress in the 50s in many studios of Mexico City. She was the Spanish voice of Carol Burnett in The Carol Burnett Show and dubbed into Spanish many actresses as Linda Cristal, Sophia Loren, among others.

== Death ==
Mérida died on 11 April 2012, aged 82.
