= Maty Huitrón =

Mexican actress (1936–2019)

- Born: Martina Güitrón Porto; 30 January 1936; Mexico City, Mexico
- Died: 14 January 2019 (aged 82); Miami, Florida, U.S.
- Occupation: Actress
- Years active: 1953–2014
- Spouse: Carlos Estrada Lang (died 2016)
- Children: 3; including Carla Estrada

Maty Huitrón (born Martina Güitrón Porto; 30 January 1936 – 14 January 2019) was a Mexican actress. She worked with the most important figures of the time, such as Cantinflas, Joaquín Pardavé and Fernando Soler.

== Career ==
Huitrón made her theatrical debut with the play Yo Colón, starring Mario Moreno "Cantinflas", and with which the Teatro de los Insurgentes was inaugurated on 30 April 1953. Although the play was not well received, that same year Maty became an icon in Mexico after she was photographed on Madero Street in Mexico City by photojournalist Nacho Lopez.

Huitrón had a long career as an actress and would go on to star in films such as My Father Was at Fault (1953), Dona Mariquita of My Heart (1953) and El casto Susano (1954). She was also known for her roles in telenovelas such as El privilegio de amar (1998–1999) and Amor real (2003), both produced by her daughter Carla Estrada.

She was president of the Casa del Actor, a home for retired Mexican actors, founded by Cantinflas.

Huitrón retired from the stage in 2014 due to health problems.

== Personal life ==
Huitrón was married to journalist Carlos Silvestre Estrada Lang for 34 years until his death in 2016 at the age of 100. She had three children, María Mar, Rocío, and renowned telenovela producer Carla Estrada.

== Death ==
Huitrón died on 14 January 2019 at a hospital in Miami, Florida from emphysema at the age of 82. She had been suffering respiratory problems for many years as a result of decades of smoking.

A number of entertainers paid their tributes to the late actress, including Lucero, Emilio Larrosa, Jorge Ortiz de Pinedo, Sergio Mayer, Daniela Romo, Victoria Ruffo and Erika Buenfil.
