= Helena Rojo =

Mexican actress and model (1944–2024)

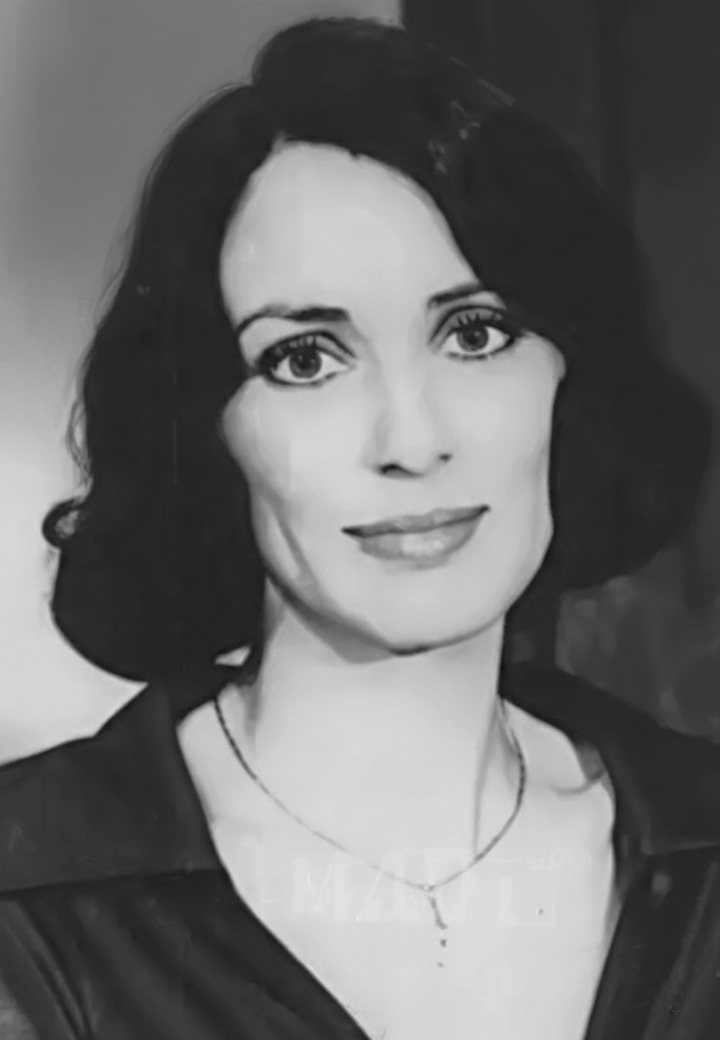
- Helena Rojo in 1978
- Born: María Elena Enríquez Ruiz; 18 August 1944; Mexico City, Mexico
- Died: 3 February 2024 (aged 79); Mexico City, Mexico
- Occupation: Actress

María Elena Enríquez Ruiz (18 August 1944 – 3 February 2024), known as Helena Rojo, was a Mexican actress.

== Biography ==
Born in Mexico City, Mexico, she began her career as a model in 1961. Toward the end of the decade, she studied drama with renowned Mexican directors Carlos Ancira and José Luis Ibáñez, making her film debut in 1968 in the film El Club de los suicidas. That same year, Rojo appeared in her second film, Los Amigos. She continued working as a model and appearing in small film roles in the late 1960s and early 1970s.

In 1969, she signed an exclusivity contract with Productora Cinematográfica Marte. Later, she began expanding her acting career into television and theater. In 1974, her first television role was the lead in the telenovela Extraño en su pueblo.

Rojo's cinematic career led her to work with the most important Mexican film directors of the 1970s and 1980s, such as Felipe Cazals, Arturo Ripstein, Rafael Corkidi, Alberto Bojórquez, Marcela Fernández Violante, and Jorge Fons.

Rojo worked with international talents, such as German director Werner Herzog and actor Klaus Kinski, with a role in the film Aguirre, the Wrath of God. She also appeared in the film Foxtrot (1976), directed by Arturo Ripstein, alongside actors Charlotte Rampling, Peter O'Toole, and Max von Sydow.

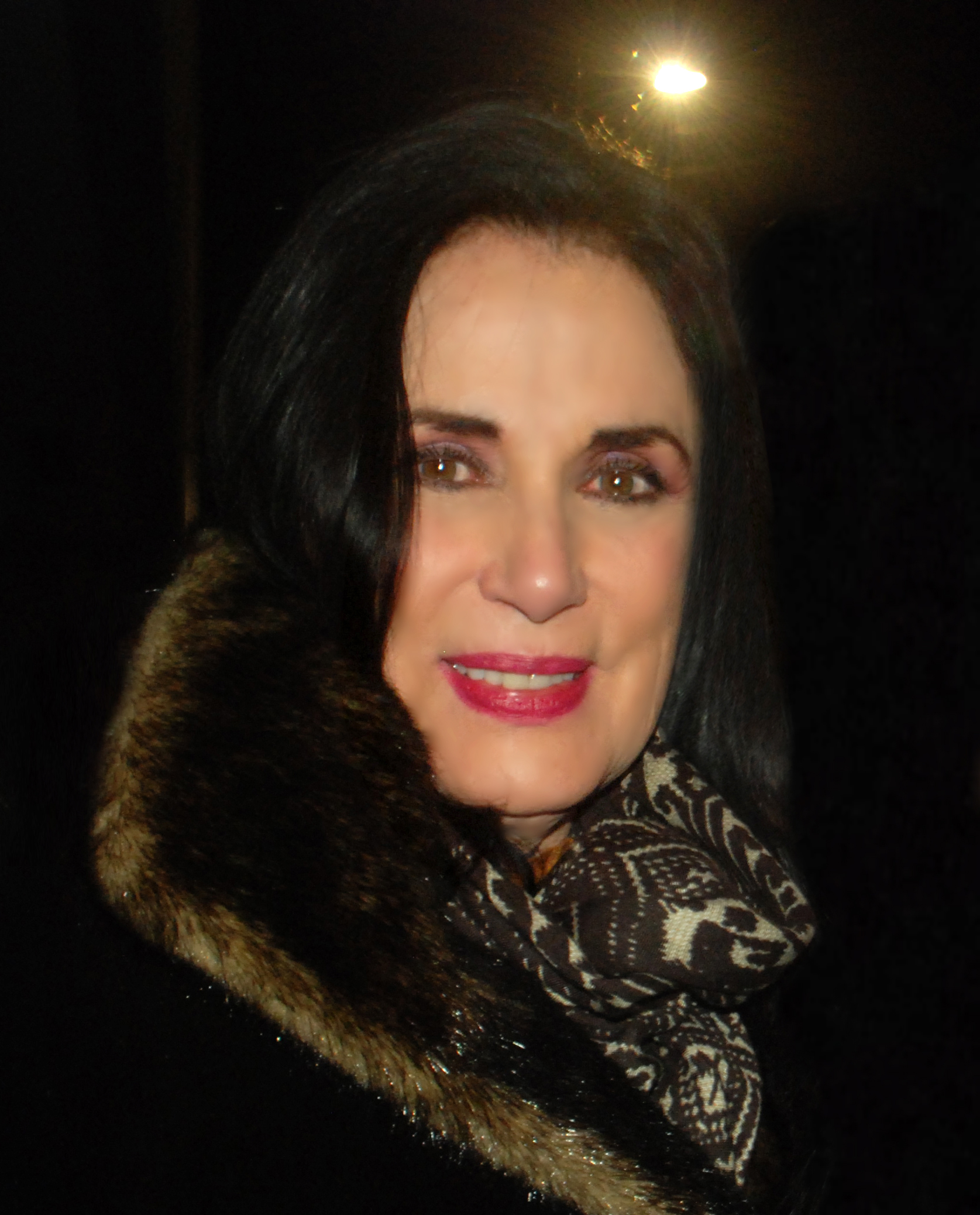
Helena Rojo in 2016

In 2006, she appeared in the American dramedy series Ugly Betty, playing a mother who tries to steer her son away from the stepmother who has eyes for him in a "faux" telenovela watched on TV by the main character's family.

== Death ==
Rojo died from cancer on 3 February 2024, at the age of 79.

== Filmography ==
=== Films ===
Year	Title	Character	Note
1968	Los amigos		Film
1970	Las bestias jóvenes		Film
1970	El club de los suicidas		Film
1970	Cruz de amor	Vicky	Film
1971	Siempre hay una primera vez	Isabel	Film
1971	Eye for an Eye	Rina Pittman	Film
1971	Una vez, un hombre...	Susana	Film
1972	End of the Party	Elena	Film
1972	Victoria		Film
1972	Queen Doll	Carmen	Film
1972	Indio		Film
1972	Mirage		Film
1972	Angels and Cherubs	Angela	Film
1972	El payo - un hombre contra el mundo!	Lupe	Film
1972	Aguirre, the Wrath of God	Inez	Film
1973	The Cubs	Tere	Film
1973	Aquellos años	Carlota	Film
1973	Los Perros de Dios	Laura	Film
1975	Mary, Mary, Bloody Mary	Greta	Film
1975	The House in the South	Elena	Film
1975	Darker Than Night	Pilar	Film
1976	The Great Adventure of Zorro	Helena	Film
1976	The Far Side of Paradise	Alexandra	Film
1978	The Children of Sanchez		Film
1979	Crónica íntima		Film
1980	La Sucesion	Mariana	Film
1980	Misterio	Silvia	Film
1981	Noche de juerga	Dolores	Film
1982	En el país de los pies ligeros		Film
1983	Pajaros de ciudad		Film
1988	Don't Panic	Mrs. Smith	Film
1988	Reto a la vida	Elena	Film
1988	Lovers, partners & Spies	Duchess	Film
1990	El motel de la muerte		Film
1992	Muerte ciega	Alisa	Film
1992	Una Luz en la escalera	Adriana Bernal	Film
1992	Los años de Greta	Nora	Film
1992	Mas alla del deseo	Josefa	Film
1993	Guerrero negro	Eva	Film
1994	Una luz en la escalera	Adriana	Film
1994	Luces de la noche	Tina	Film
2008	Amor letra por letra	Fabiola	Film
2009	Borderline	Shanti	Film
2010	Catarsis	La madre	Film

2023 A Deadly Invitation

=== Television ===
Year	Title	Character	Note
1974	Extraño en su pueblo	Isaura	Main role
1976	Mañana será otro dia	Paola	Supporting role
1977	La venganza	María Olivares/Alejandra Balmaseda	Lead role
1978	La hora del silencio	Bárbara	Main role
1981–1982	Extraños caminos del amor	Isabela	Main role
1984–1985	La traición	Antonia Guerra	Main role
1992	Las secretas intenciones	Antonieta Alcantara	Main cast
1995–1996	Retrato de familia	Cecilia Mariscal	Main role
1997	Gente bien	Rebeca Balmori	Main cast
1998–1999	El privilegio de amar	Luciana Duval	Main role
2000	Ramona	Doña Ramona Gonzaga Viuda de Moreno	Main cast
2000	Abrázame muy fuerte	Damiana / Juliana Guillen	Main cast
2003	Amor real	Doña Augusta Curiel de Penalver y Beristain	Main cast
2004–2005	Inocente de ti	Rebeca/Raquel Linares Robles	Main cast
2005–2006	Peregrina	Sabina	Supporting role
2006–2007	Mundo de Fieras	Miriam de Rivas del Castillo	Main role
2007	Amor sin maquillaje	Inés Rivera	Supporting role
2008–2009	Cuidado con el ángel	Cecilia de Velarde	Main cast
2009–2010	Corazón salvaje	Leonarda Montes de Oca de Vidal	Main cast
2010–2011	Triunfo del amor	Herself	Guest star
2010	Locas de amor	Norma	
2012	Por Ella Soy Eva	Eugenia Mistral de Caballero	Main cast
2014	The Color of Passion	Milagros Fuentes de Escalante	Main cast
2016	Corazón que miente	Sara Sáenz Vda. de Castellanos	Main cast
2016–2017	La candidata	Natalia de San Román	Main cast
2017	El vuelo de la victoria	Maria Isabel Viuda de la Peña	Recurring role
2019	Por amar sin ley	Lucia Carvajal	Guest star (season 2)
2019	El corazón nunca se equivoca	Dora Ortega Fabela	Main cast
2021	Te acuerdas de mí	Alicia Limantour	Guest star
2022	Esta historia me suena	Emma	Episode: "Torero"
2022	María Félix: La Doña	Señora Russek	
2023	Amores que engañan	Lorena	Episode: "El preferido de mamá"
2023	Vencer la culpa	Ángeles Román	Main cast
2024	El Conde: Amor y honor	Guadalupe de Gaitán	Guest star (Filmed in 2022)

== Theater performances ==
- Mujeres de Ceniza (Women of ashes)
- Dios mio hazme viuda por favor (God please make me a widow)
- Las muchachas del club (The Club Girls)
- Cuentas muertas (Dead accounts)
- El cartero (The Mailman)
- Bajo cero (Below zero)
- 10, el marido perfecto (10, The Perfect Husband)
- Lecciones para casadas (Lectures for Married Women)
- Se infiel y no mires con quien (Be Unfaithful with Whomever)
- Cena de Matrimonios (Dinner with Married Couples)
- Me enamoré de una bruja (I fell in love with a Witch)
- La mujer del pelo rojo (The Redheaded Woman)
- Pecado en la isla de las cabras (Sin on the Isle of Goats)
- La Ronda de las Arpías (Song of the Harpies)
- Una oferta inmoral (Indecent Proposal)
- Yo miento, tú mientes, todos mentimos (I Lie, You Lie, We All Lie)

== Ariel Awards ==
- Won – 1972 Best Supporting Actress Ariel Award from the Mexican Academy of Film, for her role in Fin de Fiesta
- Nominated – 1973 Best Actress Ariel Award from the Mexican Academy of Film, for her role in Los Cachorros
- Won – 1981 Best Actress Ariel Award from the Mexican Academy of Film, for her role in Misterio
- Nominated – 1992 Best Actress Ariel Award from the Mexican Academy of Film, for her role in Muerte Ciega

== TVyNovelas Awards ==
- Nominated 1985 – Best Leading Actress – La Traición
- Nominated 1996 – Best Leading Actress – Retrato de Familia
- Won 1999 – Best Leading Actress – El privilegio de Amar
- Won 2001 – Best Senior Actress – Abrázame muy Fuerte
- Won 2005 – Best Antagonistic Actress – Inocente de Ti
- Nominated 2006 – Best Senior Actress – Peregrina
- Won 2007 – Best Senior Actress – Mundo de Fieras
- Won 2009 – Best Senior Actress – Cuidado con el ángel
- Nominated 2010 – Best Senior Actress – Corazón Salvaje
- Nominated 2013 – Best Senior Actress – Por ella soy Eva
- Nominated 2015 – Best Senior Actress – El Color de la Pasión
- Won 2017 – Best Senior Actress – La Candidata
