= Chantal Andere =

Mexican actress and singer

- Born: Jacqueline Chantal Fernández-Andere; January 25, 1972 (age 54); Mexico City, Mexico
- Occupations: Actress, singer
- Years active: 1983–present
- Spouses: Roberto Gómez Fernández (m. 2001; div. 2006) Enrique Rivero Lake (m. 2008)
- Children: 2
- Parents: Jacqueline Andere; José María Fernández Unsáin

Jacqueline Chantal Fernández Andere (Spanish pronunciation: [tʃanˈtal anˈdeɾe], born January 25, 1972) is a Mexican actress and singer, best known for her portrayal of antagonistic roles in multiple telenovelas.

== Early life and career ==
Andere was born in Mexico City to Mexican actress Jacqueline Andere (born 1938) and Argentine writer Jose Maria Fernandez Unsain (1918–1997). As a child, she studied ballet and attended acting and singing classes. Her first professional acting role came in 1983 with Polo, Pelota Amarilla. After that, she began acting in theatre and then television. Though she saw no success, Andere embarked on her singing career. Possessing a great voice, she recorded three albums for Discos Melody, beginning with her self-titled debut in 1990 which featured her songs "Regresa" and "Virginia", followed by another self-titled album in 1992 featuring "Entre Tú y Yo" and "Contigo el Amor es Mucho Mas", and finally in 1995 with her album Tentaciones.

In 1994, Andere became popular for her character of Angélica Santibáñez, the main antagonist in Marimar, starring Thalía. Andere has played various types of villainess in numerous telenovelas produced by Televisa, including Dulce Desafío, Los Parientes Pobres, El noveno mandamiento, La usurpadora, Amor real, Barrera de Amor, Destilando Amor, Sortilegio, Rafaela, and La mujer del Vendaval. In 2021, she made her debut on Telemundo in the telenovela Parientes a la fuerza.

In 2006, she also appeared in the singing competition Cantando por un sueño alongside her partner Gerardo Urquiza. In 2020, Andere participated in the reality-singing competition Tu cara me suena, a TV show based on the Your Face Sounds Familiar format.

== Personal life ==
Andere was married to producer Roberto Gómez Fernández, son of famous Mexican comedian Roberto Gomez Bolaños, until 2006. Andere later married Enrique Rivero Lake in December 2008. They have a daughter and a son.

== Discography ==
=== Albums ===
- Chantal (1990)
- Chantal (1992)
- Tentaciones (1995)

=== Singles ===
- "Regresa" (1990)
- "Entre tú y yo" (1992)

== Selected filmography ==
=== Television ===
Year	Title	Character	Role
1988–89	Dulce desafío	Rebeca Zenteno	Main cast
1989–90	Un Rostro en mi pasado	Mariela Vidal	Supporting role
1991	Madres egoistas	Carmen Ledesma Arriaga	Main cast
1993	Los Parientes Pobres	Alba Zavala	Main cast
1994	Marimar	Angélica Narváez de Santibáñez	Main cast
1995–96	Acapulco, cuerpo y alma	Haydeé San Román	Main cast
1996–97	Sentimientos Ajenos	Leonor de la Huerta	Main cast
1998	La usurpadora	Estefanía Bracho de Montero	Main cast
1999–2000	Cuento de Navidad	Beatriz "Betty" de Rodríguez Coder	Main cast
2001	El noveno mandamiento	Clara Durán de Villanueva (Young)	Main cast
2001	La Intrusa	Raquel Junquera Brito	Main cast
2001	Diseñador ambos sexos	Fabiola Montemayor de Shrinner	
2002	La Otra	Bernarda Sáenz (Young)	Guest star
2003	Amor real	Antonia Morales	Main cast
2005–06	Barrera de amor	Manola Linares de Zamora	Main cast
2007	Destilando Amor	Minerva Olmos de Montalvo	Main cast
2008	S.O.S.: Sexo y otros Secretos	Natalia	
2009	Sortilegio	Raquel Albéniz Valverde de Castelar	Main cast
2011	Rafaela	Mireya Vival de Báez	Main cast
2012–13	La mujer del Vendaval	Lic. Octavia Cotilla de Hernández	Main cast
2015	Antes muerta que Lichita	Sandra Madariaga	Main cast
2017	El bienamado	Justina Samperio	Main cast
2018	Tenías que ser tú	Lorenza	Supporting role
2020	Tu cara me suena	Herself	
2021	Parientes a la fuerza	Leticia	Main cast
2021	Mi fortuna es amarte	Constanza	Main cast
2023	¿Quién es la máscara?	Avispa	
2023	El maleficio	Dolores	Main cast
2024	El Conde: Amor y honor	Josefina de Zambrano	Main cast
2025	Velvet: El nuevo imperio	Blanca Morales	Main cast

=== Theater ===
- Blanca Nieves y los siete enanos (1986)
- La pandilla (1987)
- Una pareja con Ángel
- Amor sin barreras
- Cabaret (2006)
- Victor/Victoria (2009)
- Cena de Matrimonios (2010)

== Awards and nominations ==
=== Premios TVyNovelas ===
Year	Category	Telenovela	Result
1990	Best Female Revelation	Dulce desafío	Nominated
1990	Best Female Debut	Dulce desafío	Won
1992	Best Young Lead Actress	Madres egoístas	Nominated
1994	Best Female Antagonist	Los parientes pobres	Nominated
1995	Best Female Antagonist	Marimar	Nominated
1997	Best Female Antagonist	Sentimientos Ajenos	Won
1999	Best Co-star Actress	La usurpadora	Nominated
2004	Best Female Antagonist	Amor Real	Nominated
2008	Best Female Antagonist	Destilando Amor	Won
2012	Best Female Antagonist	Rafaela	Nominated

=== Premios Bravo ===
Year	Category	Telenovela	Result
2008	Best Actress Antagonist	Destilando Amor	Won

=== Premios de la Asociación de Cronistas y Periodistas Teatrales (ACPT) ===
Year	Category	Work	Result
2007	Best Actress Revelation	Víctor Victoria	Won
2010	Best Actress in Comedy	La Güera Rodríguez	Won
