= List of awards and nominations received by Adela Noriega =

Adela Amalia Noriega Méndez (born October 24, 1969), better known as Adela Noriega (Spanish pronunciation: [aˈðela noɾˈjeɣa]), is a Mexican actress.

The following is a list of awards and nominations received by Noriega. The list is incomplete.

== Awards and nominations ==
=== New York Latin ACE Awards ===
Year	Category	Nominated work	Result	Ref.
1999	Female Figure of the Year	María Isabel	Nominated	
2001	Best Television Actress	El privilegio de amar	Won	
2002	Best Television Actress	El Manantial	Won	
2005	Best Television Actress	Amor Real	Won	

=== Bravo Awards ===
Year	Category	Nominated work	Result	Ref.
2002	Best Television Actress	El Manantial	Won	

=== Sol de Oro Awards ===
Sol de Oro is awarded by the Mexico's National Association of Journalists.

Year	Category	Nominated work	Result	Ref.
2002	Best Television Actress	El Manantial	Won	
2004	Best Television Actress	Amor Real	Won	

=== Laurel de Oro Awards ===
Year	Category	Nominated work	Result	Ref.
2005	Best Television Actress	Amor Real	Won	

=== TVyNovelas Awards (Mexico) ===
Year	Category	Nominated work	Result	Ref.
1985	Revelation in Comedy Series	Cachún cachún ra ra!	Nominated	
1986	Best Female Debutant	Juana Iris	Won	
1987	Best Young Lead Actress	Yesenia	Nominated	
1988	Best Young Lead Actress	Quinceañera	Won	
1990	Best Young Lead Actress	Dulce desafío	Won	
1998	Best Young Lead Actress	María Isabel	Won	
1999	Best Young Lead Actress	El privilegio de amar	Won	
2002	Best Lead Actress	El Manantial	Won	
2004	Best Lead Actress	Amor Real	Won	
2006	Best Lead Actress	La esposa virgen	Nominated	
2009	Best Lead Actress	Fuego en la sangre	Nominated	

=== TVyNovelas Awards (Colombia) ===
Year	Category	Nominated work	Result	Ref.
1996	Best Lead Actress	María Bonita	Nominated	

=== Palmas de Oro Awards ===
Year	Category	Nominated work	Result	Ref.
1988	Best Young Lead Actress	Quinceañera	Won	
2002	Best Lead Actress	El Manantial	Won	

=== Eres Awards ===
Year	Category	Nominated work	Result	Ref.
1998	Best Young Actress	María Isabel	Nominated	
1999	Best Young Actress	El privilegio de amar	Nominated	

=== Califa de Oro Awards ===
Year	Category	Nominated work	Result	Ref.
1999	Best Leading Actress	El privilegio de amar	Won	
2003	Best Leading Actress	Amor Real	Won	

=== El Heraldo de México Awards ===
Year	Category	Nominated work	Result	Ref.
1985	Female Revelation	—N/a	Won	

=== INTE Awards ===
Year	Category	Nominated work	Result	Ref.
2003	Best Television Actress	El Manantial	Nominated	
2004	Best Television Actress	Amor Real	Nominated	

=== FAMA Awards ===
Year	Category	Nominated work	Result	Ref.
2009	Best Television Actress	Fuego en la sangre	Won	
