= Angélica Vale =

Mexican actress

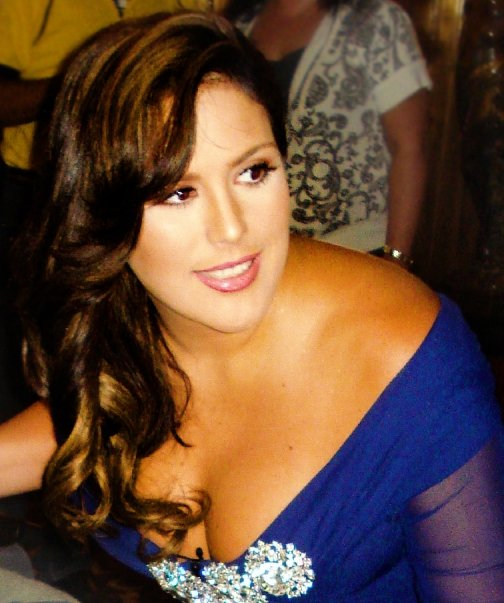
- Vale in 2009
- Citizenship: Mexico (1975–present); United States (2016–present)
- Occupations: Actress; singer; comedian
- Years active: 1975–present
- Mother: Angélica María

Angélica María Vale Hartman known as Angelica Vale. She is a Mexican-American actress and singer. She is the daughter of Angélica María, known as "La Novia de México" (Mexico's Sweetheart), and Venezuelan comedian Raúl Vale. Although she has been working as an actress for nearly 30 years, she achieved widespread fame in 2006 as the protagonist of the Mexican telenovela La Fea Más Bella (The Prettiest Ugly Girl), in which she starred alongside her real-life mother.

Angélica Vale is a highly recognized Mexican actress, singer, and comedian with an extensive career in live musical theatre, often described as a "triple threat" on stage. With over four decades in the entertainment industry, she has participated in 30 plays.

Vale also starred as Luchita Guerra, a young woman with big dreams of becoming a singer, in the webnovela No me hallo. In early 2012, she was a team captain on the Mexican TV show Parodiando, which aired on the Televisa network. Vale became a U.S. citizen in 2016, while retaining her Mexican citizenship.

== Acting career ==
Background: She began her career as an infant with just two months old on stage with her mother, Angélica María.

"Chicago" the Musical: In 2020, she debuted as Mama Morton in the Mexican production of Chicago, a role she considered a highlight of her theatrical career. "Mentiras: El Musical": She has participated in this popular Mexican musical, which is based on 80s hits. "Las Angelicas": She performs in a show with her mother, Angélica María, which blends live musical stage comedy, theater, and concerts. Style: She is considered the "Latina Queen of Stage Comedy".

As a child, in the movie El Gran Triunfo in 1981, Vale portrayed the daughter of Mexican superstar Rigo Tovar.

In 1998, she portrayed Julieta in Soñadoras and in 2001, she portrayed Wendy Nayeli Pérez in Amigas y rivales, both major roles which won acclaim for the actress. However, the soap opera La Fea Más Bella was her first starring role in any Mexican telenovela, though she had appeared in a number of Spanish language programs. As a comedian, Vale was one of the main celebrity impersonators in the comedy show La Parodia, from 2000 to 2005, but she chose to leave the show because she wanted to take some weeks off. From 2005 to 2006, she performed in El Privilegio de Mandar (The Privilege to Command), which was a parody of an earlier soap opera starring Adela Noriega and was titled El Privilegio de Amar (The Privilege to Love).

Because telenovelas are wildly popular throughout the Hispanic world, they are very profitable, even without high ratings. When as of 2006, La Fea Más Bella became the number one Univision TV program according to 2006 Nielsen ratings, Vale was looked upon by many producers as a "sure thing," and it was speculated that this success would open the door for greater things to come.

Vale was one of eight people featured on the cover of People en Español's "Los 50 Más Bellos" 2007 yearly issue and was featured alone on the July 2007 cover of the magazine, reportedly more because of her recent popularity than because of her overall lengthy career (as many people in the business had stated that she was finally getting the international attention that she had come to deserve after laboring her talents so long and having very little ethical and commercial success).

In April 2007, People en Español announced that Vale would make a special guest appearance on Ugly Betty, in which she'd reprise her Lety role in the episode "A Tree Grows in Guadalajara," but instead she played a Lety look-alike named Angélica, who was a dental assistant, in the season finale. Although her mother officially left Televisa after both actresses appeared on Mujeres Asesinas in 2009, Vale is still with Televisa, having most recently appeared on Parodiando.

After a 10-year absence from telenovelas, she starred in the Telemundo telenovela "La Fan," her fourth leading role. Alongside her were Juan Pablo Espinosa, Gabriel Porras, Scarlet Ortiz, and other actors.

In 2015, Angélica signed an exclusive contract with the American network Telemundo, where she has already worked on two projects: the program "¡Qué Noche!" and the telenovela "La Fan."

In 2018, she returned to Televisa to star in the telenovela "Y Mañana Será Otro Día," produced by Carlos Moreno Laguillo, alongside Diego Olivera and Alejandra Barros.

In dubbing, she is known for being the voice of Ellie in the Ice Age franchise, beginning with the second film. She was also the original voice of Bibi in *Una película de huevos*, *Otra película de huevos y un pollo*, *Un gallo con muchos huevos*, *Un rescate de huevitos*, *Huevitos congelados*, and Coco.

== Teather ==
Year Play Rol 2019 Chicago el musical Mama Morton (Actriz invitada) 2011-2019 Mentiras: el musical Daniela 2005 José el soñador Narradora (Actriz invitada)[4] 2004 Los miserables Eponine (Actriz invitada)[5] La casa de Bernarda Alba Adela 1985 Mago de Oz. Cuento de Frank Baum Dorotea Cenicienta Cenicienta Atrapada en los 60 ? Vaselina Sandy Mamá ama el rock ? 1989 Los tenis rojos ?

== TV Host ==
Appeared in the Mexican TV morning show Hoy, Big Brother Mexico, and Juego de Voces.

== Radio career ==
On October 15, 2019, Vale began hosting middays at Latin pop/reggaetón "Cali 93.9" KLLI in Los Angeles. On January 28, 2020, she moved to mornings and added a side-kick Jose Quintero, who from 2017 to 2020 served as jr. producer of the morning show at KLVE in Los Angeles.

== Singing career ==
Like her mother, Vale is also a singer and has performed on the soundtrack for La fea más bella. She did several notable impersonations of another singer, Verónica Castro on La Parodia doing parodies of Castro's show, Mala noche... no!. Vale is also listed in that program's credits as a singer of its theme song. She has also done many impressions of singers Shakira, Thalía, and Laura León among others while she worked on Soñadoras and Amigas y rivales; she also used some of these once more in La Parodia.

In 2007, after the finale of La Fea Más Bella, she sang one of the theme songs for the hit soap opera during an appearance on El Show de Cristina. During 2008, she made the music album Navidad con Amigos with Ricardo Montaner.

== Personal life ==
=== Family ===
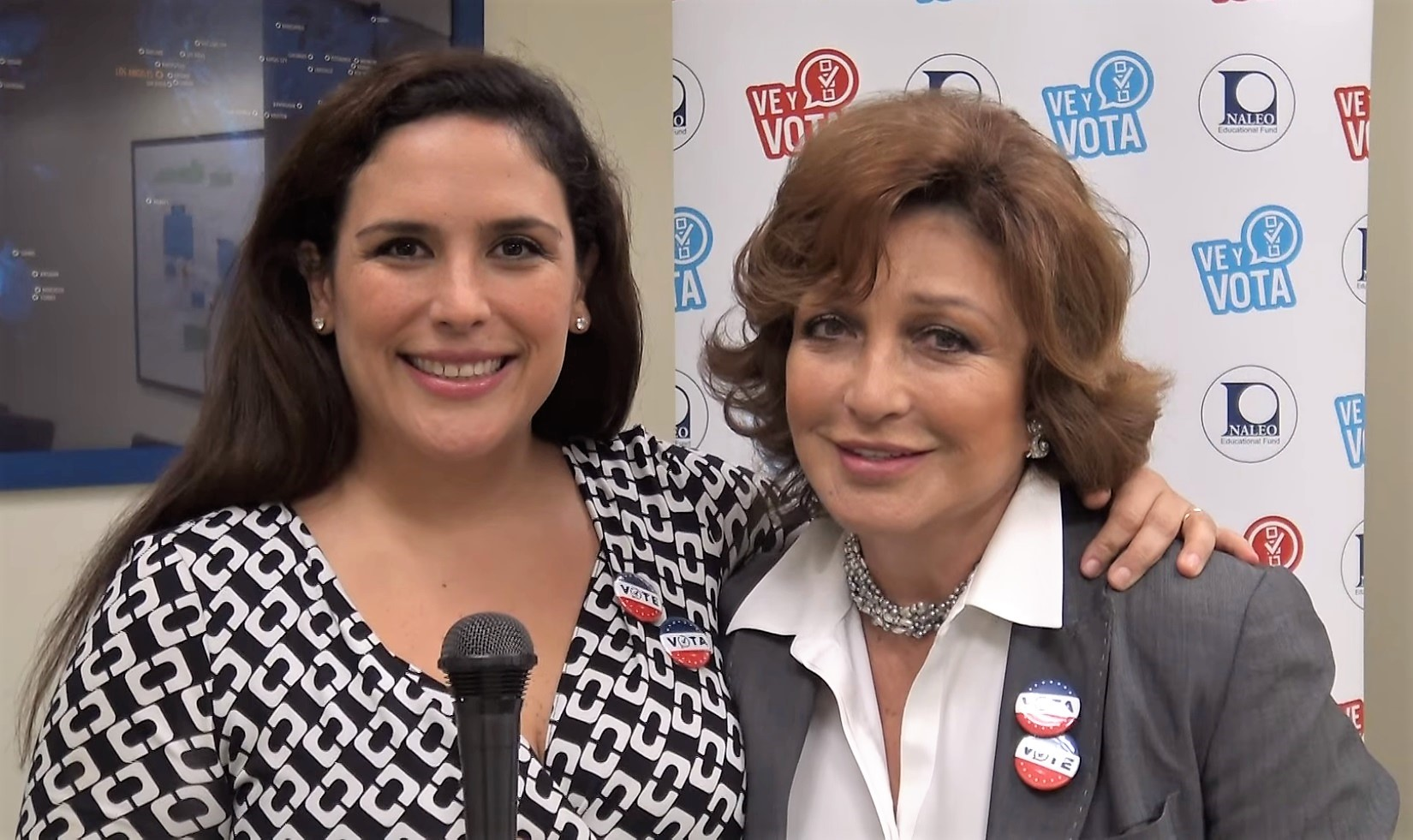
Vale (left) with mother Angélica María in 2016

Vale's father was Venezuelan while her mother is Mexican American who was born in Louisiana; she has a Jewish grandfather.

She and her mother, Angélica María, are among the very few daughter – mother entertainers to be inducted into the Paseo de las Luminarias at the Plaza de las Estrellas. Vale was inducted for her work in television and regarding her contribution to the recording industry. Additionally, she and her mother each have a star on the Hollywood Walk of Fame.

Vale and her parents are featured in the 2007 book Televisa Presenta, which was published during the culmination of the Network's golden anniversary.

=== Citizenship ===
In 2016, Vale became a naturalized U.S. citizen.

== Filmography ==
=== Films ===
Year	Title	Role	Notes
1979	La guerra de los pasteles	Niña	Uncredited
1980	El Coyote y la Bronca	Child Amalia	
2006	Una película de huevos	Bibi	Voice
2006	Ice Age: The Meltdown	Ellie	Spanish dubbing
2009	Otra película de huevos y un pollo	Bibi	Voice
2009	Ice Age: Dawn of the Dinosaurs	Ellie	Spanish dubbing
2012	Ice Age: Continental Drift	Ellie	Spanish dubbing
2015	Un gallo con muchos huevos	Bibi	Voice
2016	Ice Age: Collision Course	Ellie	Spanish dubbing
2017	Coco	Mama Imelda	Spanish dubbing
2018	Marcianos vs. Mexicanos	La Tlacoyito	Voice
2020	Un rescate de huevitos	Bibi	Voice
2024	IF	Blossom	Voice
2025	Diario, Mujer & Café	Fabiola	

=== Television ===
Year	Title	Role	Notes
1975	El milagro de vivir	Bebé Alejandra	
1978	Muñeca rota	Unknown role	
1981	El hogar que yo robé	Aurorita	
1982	Lupita	Lupita	
1985	Mago de Oz Cuento de Frank Baum	Dorotea	Television film https://archive.org/details/el-mago-de-oz-cuento-de-frank-baum-1985
1986	Herencia maldita	Adela Beltrán	
1987	Papá soltero	Angie	"Vaselina" (Season 1, Episode 20)
1990	Ángeles blancos	Priscilla	
1992	Ángeles sin paraíso	Unknown role	
1995	Lazos de amor	Tere	
1996	Bendita mentira	Margarita	
1997	El secreto de Alejandra	Gloria	
1998	Soñadoras	Julieta Ruiz Castañeda	
1998–2002	Mujer, casos de la vida real	Various roles	2 episodes
2000	Hoy	Herself	Host
2001	Amigas y rivales	Wendy Nayeli Pérez	
2002	Big Brother México	Herself	Host
2002	La hora pico	Various roles	
2002	Las vías del amor	Herself	
2002–2005	La parodia	Various	
2004	Cancionera	Unknown role	
2006	El privilegio de mandar	Various	"Final" (Season 1)
2006–2007	La fea más bella	Leticia Padilla Solís "Lety"	Also playback singer
2007	Ugly Betty	Angelica	"East Side Story" (Season 1, Episode 23)
2009	Mujeres asesinas	Julia Espinoza	"Julia, encubridora" (Season 2, Episode 7)
2011	No me hallo	Luchita	15 episodes
2013	Amores verdaderos	Unknown role	"Nelsón herido" (Season 1, Episode 167)
2017	La Fan	Valentina Pérez	Writer
2018	Jane The Virgin	Marisol	Chapter Seventy-Eight
2018	Y mañana será otro día	Mónica Rojas	
2019	Seis Manos	García (voice)	8 episodes
2020	Tu cara me suena	Herself	Judge
2021	Los Lopeggs	Carla (voice)	6 episodes

== Discography ==
- 1989: Angélica Vale
- 1990: Nuestro Show No Puede Parar
- 1992: Atrapada En Los 60's
- 2002: Amigas y Rivales Soundtrack
- 2006: La Fea Más Bella Soundtrack
- 2008: Navidad con Amigos
- 2015: "Dinastia: Angelica Vale y Angelica Maria"

== Awards and nominations ==
Year	Award	Category	Nominee	Result
2003	Premios TVyNovelas	Best Comedic Performance	La Parodia	Won
2007	Premios TVyNovelas	Best Lead Actress	La Fea Más Bella	Won
