= Cancionera =

Cancionera may refer to:

- Cancionera (album) (2025), by Natalia Lafourcade
- Cancionera (TV series) (1980), a Mexican telenovela
