= La Búsqueda =

La Búsqueda may refer to:

- La Búsqueda (Argentine film), 1985
- La búsqueda (TV series), 1966
- The Quest (1996 film) (La búsqueda in its Spanish-language release), Jean-Claude Van Damme film
