= En busca del paraíso =

En busca del paraíso may refer to:

- En busca del paraíso (1968 TV series), a Mexican telenovela
- En busca del paraíso (1982 TV series), a Mexican telenovela
