= Norma Herrera =

Mexican telenovela and film actress (b. 1942)

- Born: 24 May 1942 (age 83); Ciudad del Carmen, Mexico
- Occupations: Actress, singer
- Years active: 1967–present
- Known for: Telenovelas
- Spouse: Raúl Araiza
- Children: Raúl Araiza Herrera; Armando Araiza
- Awards: Ariel Award (1980)

Norma Edith Herrera Ysunza (born 24 May 1942) is a Mexican actress and singer known for her work in telenovelas, theater, and film. Since the 1970s she has starred in numerous successful television dramas and telenovelas.

Her career has spanned several decades, and she is recognized for her acting skills and contributions to Mexican television. In addition to her work in television, she has been involved in voice acting and theater productions, both comedic and dramatic.

== Career ==
Norma Herrera started her career in television, mainly in telenovelas that brought her widespread recognition.

Some of her early notable telenovelas include Un grito en la oscuridad (1965), Deborah (1967) and Pasión gitana (1968).

In the 1970s, she co-starred in Las gemelas (1972), Los que ayudan a Dios (1973) and El milagro de vivir (1975), and had a minor role in the Cantinflas film El patrullero 777 (1979).

In 1980, she starred in the film Fuego en el Mar, directed by her then-husband Raúl Araiza. For this role she was awarded the Ariel Award for Best Actress.

During the 1980s, Norma Herrera became a household name in Mexico and Latin America. She starred in some of the most iconic telenovelas of the time, often playing lead roles or important supporting characters.

Her most famous TV projects during this period include: Cicatrices del alma (1986) and Yesenia (1987). For her work in Cicatrices del alma she was nominated to the TVyNovelas Award for Best Actress.

In the late 1980s and early 1990s she reduced her TV work and starred in several films.

By 1995 he returned to TV in the successful telenovela La dueña, for which she was nominated to the TVyNovelas Award for Best Actress.

Between 1997 and 1998, she was part of the Mexican production of the musical Beauty and the Beast, playing the role of Mrs. Potts.

In 1997 she was part of the cast of the telenovela Huracán.

In 2000, she won the TVyNovelas Award for Best Leading Actress for her work in Tres mujeres the previous year.

In 2002 she co-starred in the telenovela Cómplices al rescate. Since that time, she has been in co-starring or character roles in telenovelas such as Barrera de amor (2005), Mar de amor (2009), Amor bravío (2012), Mi corazón es tuyo (2014), Simplemente María (2015), Diseñando tu amor (2021) and Gloria Trevi: Ellas soy yo (2023).

== Voice acting ==
Herrera dubbed Mrs. Potts's voice for Disney's 1991 film Beauty and the Beast and its direct-to-video sequels: Beauty and the Beast: The Enchanted Christmas (1997) and Beauty and the Beast: Belle's Magical World (1998).

In 1997 she also re-dubbed the fairy godmother for Disney's 1950 film Cinderella. She provided the singing voice in the direct-to-video sequels Cinderella II: Dreams Come True, released in 2002 and Cinderella III: A Twist in Time from 2007.

== Personal life ==
Norma Herrera was married to actor and director Raúl Araiza. He died in 2013, after being divorced for years. They had two children, both actors: Raúl Araiza Herrera and Armando Araiza, who followed in his parents' footsteps and became well-known television and film actors and hosts.

Despite her success, she has largely maintained a private personal life, focusing on her career and family.

== Awards ==
Award	Year	Category	Nominated work	Result	Source
Ariel Award	1980	Ariel Award for Best Actress	Fuego en el Mar	Won	
Choca de Oro Awards	2012	50 Years Lifetime recognition		Won	
Premios TVyNovelas	2000	TVyNovelas Award for Best Leading Actress	Tres mujeres	Won	
Premios TVyNovelas	1996	TVyNovelas Award for Best Co-lead Actress	La dueña	Nominated	
Premios TVyNovelas	1987	TVyNovelas Award for Best Actress	Cicatrices del alma	Nominated	
Premios TVyNovelas	1984	TVyNovelas Award for Best Musical Theme	El maleficio	Won	
Bravo Awards	2000	Mejor actriz protagónica	Tres mujeres	Won	
ACE Awards	1985	Mejor Actriz	El maleficio	Won	
La Maravilla Awards	1984	Mejor actriz de reparto	El maleficio	Nominated	

== Filmography ==
=== Television ===
Year	Title	Role	Notes
1965	Un grito en la obscuridad		
1967	Deborah		
1968	Pasión gitana		
1968	En busca del paraíso		
1969	Más allá de la muerte	Hildegard	
1970	La sonrisa del Diablo	Laura	
1970	La cruz de Marisa Cruces	Mónica	
1970	La Constitución	Elisa Acuña Rossetti	
1972	Las gemelas	Susana	
1972	El carruaje	Sofía	
1973	Los que ayudan a Dios	Alicia	
1975	El milagro de vivir	Leonora	
1978	Muñeca rota	Gladys	
1980	Cancionera	Norma	
1981	El derecho de nacer	María	
1983	El maleficio	Nora	
1983	El show de la numero uno	Herself	Television film
1986	Cicatrices del alma	Elvira	
1987	Yesenia	Marisela	
1990	Mujer, casos de la vida real	—N/a	Episode: "El ídolo"
1995	Mujer, casos de la vida real	Anita	Episode: "¿Que hago con mi dolor?"
1995	La dueña	Berenice Villareal Vda. de Castro	
1997	Huracán	Alfonsina Taviani de Robles	
1999	Tres mujeres	Greta Saraldi de Uriarte-Minski	
2000	Carita de ángel	Paulina de Valle	
2002	Cómplices al rescate	Doña Pura	
2005	Big Brother VIP	Herself	Episode: "Super miércoles de Madres"
2005	Barrera de amor	Remedios Gómez	
2007	Amor mío	Patrícia Herrera	Episode: "Divino divan"
2008	Un gancho al corazón	Alicia Rosales	
2009	Hazlo por ti	Herself	Television film
2009	Mar de amor	Violeta (Teacher Violeta)	
2011	Una familia con suerte	Doña Rebeca Garza de Treviño	
2012	Amor bravío	Rocío Mendiola de Albarrán	
2012	Todo incluido	—N/a	
2013	Nueva vida	—N/a	Episode: "Bebé"
2013	Libre para amarte	Gilda	Episodes: "11-17 October 2013"
2014	Mi corazón es tuyo	Soledad Fuentes	
2015	Simplemente María	Carmina	
2018	Por amar sin ley	Lucrecia de Noriega	Season 2
2021	Diseñando tu amor	Adelaida Vargas Villaponte	
2023	Gloria Trevi: Ellas soy yo	Aurora Tamez de Arredondo	

=== Film ===
Year	Title	Role	Notes
1969	The Big Cube		
1979	El patrullero 777	Pregnant woman	
1981	Fuego en el mar	Gloria Ortega	Ariel Award for Best Actress
1988	El Fiscal de hierro		
1988	Pero sigo siendo el rey		
1988	Los Camaroneros		
1987	Fuga al destino	Paulina	
1989	Al margen de la ley	Elisa	
1989	El Fiscal de hierro 2: La venganza de Ramona		
1989	El Judas en la frontera		
1990	Atrapados		
1990	Calles sangrientas		
1990	Emboscada aka Ambush		
1990	El Fiscal de hierro		
1990	Pablo Metralla		
1991	Hacer el amor con otro		
1991	Trágico carnaval		
1991	Esa mujer me vuelve loco	Yolanda	
1991	Chicago, pandillas salvajes	Ana Rosa	
1991	Chicago, pandillas salvajes II	Ana Rosa	
1991	Beauty and the Beast	Mrs. Potts	Voice acting
1992	Vintage model	Alicia Rivadeneira	
1992	Comando terrorista	Sargent	
1993	El Fiscal de hierro 4		
1993	S.I.D.A. - Síndrome de muerte	Sonia	
1997	Beauty and the Beast: The Enchanted Christmas	Mrs. Potts	Voice
1998	Beauty and the Beast: Belle's Magical World	Mrs. Potts	Voice
1999	Sangre prisionera		
2001	Corazones rotos aka Broken	Ms. Cano	

=== Theater ===
Year	Title	Role	Notes
1994	La danza que sueña la tortuga		
1997	Beauty and the Beast (musical)	Mrs. Potts	
2015	Las muchachas del club	Doris	with Helena Rojo and Julissa
2018	Dime abuelita ¿Por qué?	Paulina	Cri Cri The Musical
