= Ilse María Olivo Schweinfurth =

Mexican singer and telenovela actress (born 1965)

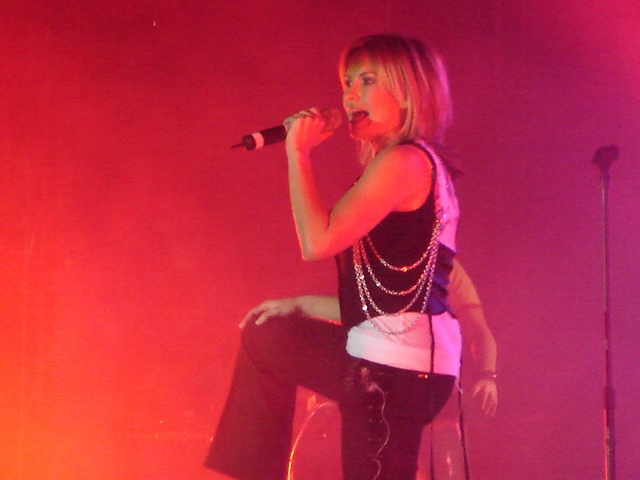
- Born: November 28, 1965 (age 60); Caracas, Venezuela
- Occupations: Singer and telenovela actress

Ilse María Olivo Schweinfurth (born 27 November 1965) is a Mexican singer and telenovela actress.

== Biography ==
Ilse was born in Caracas, Venezuela, when her parents were there in a business trip. She was born to a well-known publicist in Mexico Oscar Olivo and to his Honduran wife Ilse Schweinfurth. She studied Communications at Universidad Anáhuac. and at the age of 20 she became one of the three members of the vocal group Flans. Ilse performed the first single Bazar that made the group an instant success.

In 1989 she performed a duet with Pedro Maras on his debut self-titled album. The song, titled 'Sed' was published by BMG Music Publishing Company and is currently available on Spotify.

In 1990 the group broke up and Ilse became the host of the show Galardón a los grandes and launched a solo career in 1992 recording two albums. In 1997, Ilse obtained an important yet brief role in the telenovela María Isabel alongside Adela Noriega.

In 1999 she re-united with the other members of Flans to tour the country.

In 2003 she hosted the talk show 100% Mujer on Televisa. In 2005, Ilse became one of the judges of the TV Azteca singing competition La Academia. In 2005, after a 6 year pause, she toured with Flans again for 2 months.

She lost her sister Erika due to pneumonia on December 3, 2006.

Ilse is a single mother of 2 boys and she is currently living in Mexico City.

Ilse is married to Ricardo Balmaceda and has 2 children.

== Solo albums ==
- Africa (1992)
- El Río (1996)

== Telenovelas ==
- 'Maria Isabel' (1997) as Graciela Pereira

== Television shows ==
- La Academia (2005) as judge
- 100% mujer (2003) as host
- Plaza Sésamo (1996) as cast member
- Galardón a los grandes (1989) as host
