= Armando Araiza =

Mexican actor

- Born: Armando Araiza Herrera; September 1, 1969 (age 55); Mexico City, Mexico
- Occupation: Actor
- Years active: 1983–present
- Spouse: Elizabeth García (1997–2008)
- Partner(s): Diana Osorio (2010); Lorena Rojas (2010–2012)
- Children: 2
- Parent(s): Raúl Araiza; Norma Herrera
- Relatives: Raúl Araiza (brother)

Armando Araiza (born Armando Araiza Herrera on September 1, 1969) is a Mexican actor.

== Early life ==
Araiza was born September 1, 1969, in Mexico City, Mexico. He is a son of director Raúl Araiza and actress Norma Herrera. He has an older brother, who is also an actor, Raúl Araiza.

He first appeared in a telenovela when he was thirteen years old, in a show named El maleficio as Juanito, acting alongside his parents. In 1987, he participated in the historical telenovela about the Mexican revolution, Senda de gloria, where he played Gilberto. In the same year, he made two movies Ases del narcotráfico and Lamberto Quintero taking small roles and then participated in the telenovela Quinceañera as Chato.

In 1988, he acted in a film named Itara, el guardián de la muerte, and a year later he returned to the telenovela genre on one named Dulce desafío with Adela Noriega and Eduardo Yañez.

In 1990, he played in the telenovela Un rostro en mi pasado and in a films Más corazón que odio, Escoria otra parte de Tí, Viernes trágico and Odio en la sangre.

In 1991, he appeared in nine Mexican films Dentro de la noche, Orgía de sangre, La silla de ruedas, Hacer el amor con otro, Pandillas salvajes, Pandillas salvajes 2, Dos locos en aprietos, Yo soy la ley and Resucitaré para matarlos. In 1992, he appeared in two more films Superviviencia and Relaciones violentas.

In 1993, he was in Los Temerarios, Sueño y realidad, Contrabando de esmeraldas, Círculo de vicio, Johnny cien pesos and En espera de la muerte. In 1994, Araiza appeared in the Silla de ruedas 3, Juana la cubana, Amor que mata y Duelo final, the same year he participated in the historical drama El vuelo del águila and the films Tres minutos de oscuridad and Doble indemnización.

== Filmography ==
Telenovelas, Series, Films
Year	Title	Role	Notes
1983	El maleficio	Juan "Juanito" de Martino	Supporting Role
1987	Senda de gloria	Gilberto	Supporting Role
1987	Ases del narcotráfico		Film
1987	Lamberto Quintero	Gunman	Film
1987-88	Quinceañera	Chato	Antagonist
1988	Papa Soltero	Alan	Episode: "Llegan Las Vacaciones"
1988	Itara, el guardián de la muerte		Film
1988-89	Dulce desafío	Francisco "Paco" Fernández	Supporting Role
1989-90	Un rostro en mi pasado	Roberto Zertuche Estrada	Co-Protagonist
1990	Más corazón que odio		Film
1990	Escoria, otra parte de tí		Film
1990	Viernes trágico		Film
1990	Odio en la sangre		Film
1990	Dentro de la noche		Film
1990	Pandillas salvajes	Armando Vargas	Film
1991	Orgía de sangre		Film
1991	El silla de ruedas		Film
1991	Hacer el amor con otro		Film
1991	Resucitarse sara matarlos		Film
1991	Pandillas salvajes 2	Armando Vargas	Film
1991	Dos locos en aprietos		Film
1991	Yo soy la ley		Film
1992	Superviviencia		Film
1992	Relaciones violentas		Film
1993	En espera de la muerte		Film
1993	Johnny cien pesos	Johnny García	Film
1993	Círculo del vicio		Film
1993	Contrabando de esmeraldas		Film
1993	Sueño y Realidad	Gabriel	Film
1994	Duelo final		Film
1994	Silla de ruedas 3		Film
1994	Juana la cubana		Film
1994	Amor que mata		Film
1994-95	El vuelo del águila	Bolero	Special Appearance
1995	María José	Mateo	Supporting Role
1995	Chavos banda		Film
1995	Una papa sin catsup		Film
1996	Azul	Enrique Valverde	Protagonist
1996	La Antorche Encendida	Martín García de Carrasquero	Special Appearance
1996	Tres minutos en la oscuridad		Film
1996	Doble indemnización	Thief	Film
1998	Taxi asesino		Film
1998	Venganza siniestra		Film
1998	El último narco del cartel de Juárez		Film
1998	Maldito chilango		Film
1998	El séptimo asalto		Film
1998	Raza indomable		Film
1999	Yuri, mi verdadera historia		Film
1999	Asesinato por traición		Film
1999-00	Tres mujeres	Santiago Uriarte Saraldi	Co-Protagonist
2000	Me vale madre que no me quieras		Film
2000	V.I.H.: El muro del silencio		Film
2000	Semillas de odio	Fabián	Film
2001	El noveno mandamiento	Leandro Villanueva (young)	Protagonist (part 1)
2002-03	Así son ellas	Narciso Villaseñor	Co-Protagonist
2003	La noche de los Troyanos		Film
2005	Contra viento y marea	Imanol Balmaceda Sandoval	Antagonist
2005-06	Barrera de amor	Rodrigo Zamora Linares	Antagonist
2008	Cueste lo que cueste		Film
2008	Desbocados	Daniel	Film
2008	Mujeres Asesinas	Jorge Reascon	Episode: "Margarita, ponzoñosa"
2009	Tiempo final		Episode: "Diamantes"
2009	Mi pecado	Carmelo Roura Valdivia	Main Antagonist
2010-11	Llena de amor	Brandon Moreno Cervantes	Co-Protagonist
2011-12	Una familia con suerte	Dr. Armando	Special Appearance
2012	Abismo de pasión	Horacio Ramírez	Antagonist
2017	Johnny 100 Pesos: Capítulo 2	Johnny García	Protagonist
2021	Diseñando tu amor	Enrique Aviles	Antagonist

== Awards and nominations ==
Year	Award	Category	Telenovela	Result
1984	Premios TVyNovelas	Best Child Performance	El maleficio	Won
1988	Premios TVyNovelas	Best Male Revelation	Quinceañera	Won
1991	Premios TVyNovelas	Best Young Lead Actor	Un rostro en mi pasado	Nominated
