= El secreto de Alejandra =

Mexican telenovela

- Genre: Telenovela; Romance; Drama
- Created by: Jorge Lozano Soriano
- Written by: Lila Yolanda Andrade; Carlos Lozano Dana; Tere Medina
- Directed by: Lorenzo de Rodas; Xavier Marc
- Starring: María Sorté; Leonardo Daniel; Lisette Morelos; Rodrigo Vidal; David Ostrosky
- Opening theme: Un sueño prohibido by María Sorté
- Composer: Amparo Rubín
- Country of origin: Mexico
- Original language: Spanish
- No. of episodes: 25

Production
- Executive producer: Jorge Lozano Soriano
- Producer: José Luis León
- Production locations: Filming; Televisa San Ángel; Mexico City, Mexico
- Cinematography: Isabel Basurto; Rodolfo Morales
- Running time: 21-22 minutes
- Production company: Televisa

Original release
- Network: Canal de las Estrellas
- Release: December 1, 1997 – January 2, 1998

El secreto de Alejandra (English title: Alejandra's secret) is a Mexican telenovela produced by Jorge Lozano Soriano for Televisa in 1997. It starred by María Sorté, Leonardo Daniel, Lisette Morelos, Rodrigo Vidal and David Ostrosky.

On December 1, 1997, Canal de las Estrellas started broadcasting El secreto de Alejandra weekdays at 7:00 pm, replacing Alguna vez tendremos alas. The last episode was broadcast on January 2, 1998 with Mi pequeña traviesa replacing it the following Monday.

== Plot ==
María Sorté interprets two identical women (although not sisters) and of opposite personalities. María is an unsuccessful actress and pharmacy employee, who lives tormented by her husband, Rubén (David Ostrosky), a kidnapper and murderer who works for an organ trafficking network. Maria could never have children since the mistreatment of her husband caused an abortion that left her sterile. When he starts the soap opera, he tries to commit suicide.

Alejandra is a millionaire whose son, Matías (Rodrigo Vidal), urgently needs a kidney transplant. She herself is ill with terminal cancer, but she does not want her family to know about it and she is terrified by the idea of leaving Matías helpless.

In complicity with Sergio, his doctor (Leonardo Daniel), Alejandra appears before Maria and proposes that they exchange their lives. Thus, Maria could leave behind her life as a mistreated woman, take care of Alejandra's son and make sure she receives the transplant she requires. In addition, this would be the greatest triumph as an actress for María.

After many attempts to convince her, Maria accepts. During the first month of the telenovela broadcast, the two women prepare the exchange of lives; María, full of doubts, learns the details of Alejandra's life, as she announces to her family that she is going on a trip. Finally the identity change is made, and the false Maria (Alejandra) dies in the hospital to the surprise of her friends, (Macaria and Carmelita González), while the false Alejandra (María) returns to her house and finally meets Matías.

So far, the story had followed the original course, but with the sudden cancellation, a sudden ending was started that begins with the last scene of chapter 24. The secret of the false Alejandra is discovered immediately thanks to some recordings that the real Alejandra He left Matías. She left instructions that only listen to the cassette in case of emergency, if she one day decided to leave the house. Matías has a feeling and disobeys the instructions; when listening to the cassette he learns the truth, but without hesitation he decides to accept his "new mother" and offers to keep the secret. On the other hand, Sergio turns out to be deeply in love with María (he had also received a cassette recorded by the deceased). All the subplots and conflicts of the telenovela, which were clearly designed to last for months, are resolved in one of the most hasty endings of the history of this genre.

== Cast ==
- María Sorté as María Soler/Alejandra Monasterio
- Leonardo Daniel as Sergio Duval
- Lisette Morelos as Carola
- Rodrigo Vidal as Matías Monasterio
- David Ostrosky as Rubén
- Norma Lazareno as Paulina
- Macaria as Elvira
- Karyme Lozano as Vanessa
- Alec Von Bargen as Gerardo Espinoza
- Carmelita González as Doña Pura
- Claudio Báez as Dr. Nuñez
- Rosita Quintana as Sofía Monasterio
- Carlos Rotzinger as Cristóbal
- Angélica Vale as Gloria
- Blanca Sánchez as Rosalía
- Otto Sirgo as Carlos
- Lalo el Mimo as Macario
- Adrián Alonso as Henrique
- Arlette Pacheco as Ivonne
- Gaston Tuset as Augusto
- Jerardo as Federico
- Christian Tappan as David
- Liza Willert as Mrs. Soriano
- Luis Xavier as Víctor
- Kokin as Isaías
- Mariana Karr as Luvia Alperte
- María Idalia
- Toño Infante
- Arturo Lorca
- Beatriz Martínez
- Julio Monterde
- Clara María Diar
- Claudia Ferreiro

== Awards ==
Year	Award	Category	Nominee	Result
1997	15th TVyNovelas Awards	Best Young Lead Actor	Alex Von	Nominated
