= Bajo un mismo rostro (TV series) =

- Genre: Telenovela; Romance; Drama
- Created by: Jorge Lozano Soriano
- Written by: Jorge Lozano Soriano; Lila Yolanda Andrade
- Directed by: Antulio Jiménez Pons
- Starring: Christian Bach; Alfredo Adame; Saúl Lisazo; Carlos Cámara; Magda Guzmán; Rosario Gálvez; Lorena Rojas
- Theme music composer: Amparo Rubín
- Opening theme: Instrumental
- Country of origin: Mexico
- Original language: Spanish
- No. of episodes: 100

Production
- Executive producers: Christian Bach; Humberto Zurita
- Producer: Gerardo Zurita
- Production locations: Filming; Televisa San Ángel; Mexico City, Mexico; Locations; Tijuana, Mexico; Morelia, Mexico; Mexico City, Mexico; Athens, Greece
- Cinematography: Antulio Jiménez Pons
- Editor: Juan Carlos Camacho
- Running time: 39-45 minutes
- Production company: Televisa

Original release
- Network: Canal de las Estrellas
- Release: April 17 – August 25, 1995

Bajo un mismo rostro (English title: Single Identity) is a Mexican telenovela produced by Christian Bach and Humberto Zurita for Televisa in 1995.

Christian Bach, Alfredo Adame and Saúl Lisazo starred as protagonists, while Carlos Cámara, Roberto Blandón and Nuria Bages starred as antagonists.

== Plot ==
Irene Saldívar is a young woman, beautiful and rich, who suffers a great emotional shock after the death of her father and brother. When she recovers, Irene travels to Greece with her beloved nanny, Rosario, to free herself from bad memories. During her trip, the young woman meets Alexis Teodorakis, a wealthy Greek businessman with whom she falls madly in love. Both decide to get married without knowing that Carlos Gorostiaga, the administrator of Irene's fortune, has other plans for them.

Carlos, who was always in charge of the finances of the late Melchor Saldívar, Irene's father, is now in charge of directing the fortune of the young woman, who considers him an honest and trustworthy man. But the reality is different since Carlos is an ambitious and unscrupulous man who pretends to be a good person before his wife, Luciana Mendoza, and Irene herself. However, Carlos works in the company of Alejandro Roldán; the two seduce rich women and then kill them and keep their money.

Alejandro is as mean as Carlos; He lives in Morelia with his wife, Laura Limantur, who loves him obsessively and who is also complicit in her husband's crimes. Ramiro also lives with them their son, who is completely unaware of his parents' activities. Ramiro always regrets the absence of his father and whoever wants to control his future because his father wants to force him to work with him in family businesses when he wants to be a musician.

Carlos and Alejandro plan the death of Alexis so that Alejandro later falls in love with Irene. Their filthy purposes pay off when Alexis dies in an explosion on his yacht. Irene, who has become pregnant with Alexis's baby, returns heartbroken to Mexico, and there she receives the help of Diego Covarrubias, the doctor who treated her father and brother when they died. They both fall in love, but new obstacles appear: Estelita, Diego's sickly daughter, is too attached to the memory of her late mother Magdalena and refuses to let another woman take her place. In addition, Irene discovers that her friend Carolina has always been in love with Diego and decides to move away to leave her place for her friend since Carolina is ill with cancer and her diagnosis is short-lived.

Meanwhile, Alejandro has become obsessed with Irene; failing to earn her love, he decides to blackmail her by threatening to take away her son if she does not agree to marry him.

== Cast ==
- Christian Bach as Irene de la Concepcion Saldívar Bustamante de Teodorakis
- Alfredo Adame as Diego Covarrubias Escobedo
- Saúl Lisazo as Alexis Teodorakis Montoya
- Carlos Cámara as Carlos Gorostiaga (Villain)
- Magda Guzmán as Rosario Montez
- Rosario Gálvez as Luciana Mendoza de Gorostiaga
- Lorena Rojas as Carolina Zurbarán Castro
- Luis Aguilar as Father Tomás
- Ernesto Alonso as Melchor Saldívar
- Nuria Bages as Laura Limantur de Roldán (Main female villain)
- Roberto Blandón as Alejandro Roldán (Main male villain)
- Anthony Álvarez as Father Lorenzo
- Aurora Clavel as Lupita
- Tomás Goros as Renato
- Virginia Gutiérrez as Esther Castro de Zurbarán
- Josafat Luna as Franco Rosetti
- Marifer Malo as Estelita Covarrubias Robledo
- Ramón Menéndez as Andrés Ballesteros
- Raquel Olmedo as Cassandra Montoya Vda. de Teodorakis
- Frances Ondiviela as Melisa Papandreu
- Ramiro Orci as Arnulfo
- David Ostrosky as Rubén Montesinos
- Rodrigo Oviedo as Ramiro Roldán Limantur
- Fabián Robles as Teo
- Mayra Rojas as Sandra Carballido
- Isabel Salazar as Ana María
- Roberto Sen as Cristóbal
- Juan Soler as Marcelo Saldívar Bustamante
- Silvia Suárez as Cristina Beristáin
- Sergio Sánchez as Héctor Kazan

=== Special performances ===
- Manuel Ojeda as Dr. Santillán
- Ernesto Yáñez as Dr. Ramírez
- Krysta Wesche as Irene (child)
- Ramiro Torres as Marcelo (child)
- Luis Couturier as Vicente
- Alejandra Procuna as Sonia
- Anaís as Ana María
- Dinorah Cavazos as Iris
- Cecilia Gabriela as Magdalena Robledo de Covarrubias
- Adriana Fierro as Florencia
- Carmelita González as Lucía
- Marco Uriel as Marinero espía
- Guy de Saint Cyr as a yacht captain
- Jorge Molina as Matías
- José Antonio Marroz as Dr. Frangos
- Guillermo García Cantú as an announcer
- Fernando Balzaretti as a newsreader
- Rodrigo Abed as Mario Contreras
- Melba Luna as Doña Chole
- Alejandro Tommasi as Manuel Gorostiaga Mendoza
- Adriana Barraza as Silvana
- Rolando de Castro as Inspector Araoz
- José María Calvario as Malanchi
- Blas García as Isidro
- Humberto Zurita as Sebastián Obregón
- Roberto Ballesteros as César
- María Eugenia Ríos as Mother Esperanza
- José Roberto Hill as Ralph
- Ignacio López Tarso
- Gerardo Zurita
- Roberto Miquel
- Thelma Dorantes
- Lucía Paillés
- Arsenio Campos
- José Carlos Teruel
- Fernando Torres Lapham
- Rocío Gallardo
- Audrey Vera
- Claudio Sorel
- Javier Díaz Dueñas
- Tito Guízar
- Queta Carrasco
- Julio Monterde
- Guillermo Rivas
- Lourdes Reyes
- Eduardo Noriega
- Margarita Magaña
- Víctor González
- Raúl Castellanos
- Ninel Conde

== Awards ==
Year	Award	Category	Nominee	Result
1996	14th TVyNovelas Awards	Best Production	Christian Bach; Humberto Zurita	Won
