= Los cuatro Juanes =

- Directed by: Miguel Zacarías
- Written by: Alfredo Zacarías
- Produced by: Alfredo Zacarías
- Starring: Luis Aguilar; Antonio Aguilar; Javier Solís; Narciso Busquets; Alma Delia Fuentes; Ofelia Montesco; Rosario Gálvez; Graciela Lara
- Cinematography: Gabriel Figueroa
- Edited by: José W. Bustos
- Music by: Manuel Esperón
- Production company: Producciones Zacarías
- Release date: July 7, 1966 (Mexico)
- Running time: 95 minutes
- Country: Mexico
- Language: Spanish

Los cuatro Juanes is a 1966 Mexican Western film produced and written by Alfredo Zacarías, directed by Miguel Zacarías and starring Luis Aguilar, Antonio Aguilar, Javier Solís, Narciso Busquets, Alma Delia Fuentes, Ofelia Montesco, Rosario Gálvez and Graciela Lara.

== Cast ==
- Luis Aguilar as Juan sin Miedo
- Antonio Aguilar as Juan Colorado
- Javier Solís as Juan Pístolas
- Narciso Busquets as Juan Charrasqueado
- Alma Delia Fuentes as Soledad
- Ofelia Montesco as La Jarocha
- Rosario Gálvez as Sabina
- Graciela Lara as Irene
- Conrado Cortés as Teniente Sandoval
- Antonio Raxel as Coronel Jiménez Rangel
- Jorge Russek as Capitán
