= My Father Was at Fault =

1953 film by José Díaz Morales

- Directed by: José Díaz Morales
- Written by: José Díaz Morales; Carlos Sampelayo; Alfredo Varela
- Produced by: Gregorio Walerstein
- Starring: Meche Barba; Antonio Aguilar; Óscar Pulido
- Cinematography: Ezequiel Carrasco
- Edited by: Alfredo Rosas Priego
- Music by: Antonio Díaz Conde
- Production companies: Cinematográfica Filmex; Producciones Tuxpam
- Release date: 17 June 1953
- Running time: 90 minutes
- Country: Mexico
- Language: Spanish

My Father Was at Fault (Spanish: Mi papá tuvo la culpa) is a 1953 Mexican comedy film directed by José Díaz Morales and starring Meche Barba, Antonio Aguilar and Óscar Pulido.

== Cast ==
- Meche Barba
- Antonio Aguilar
- Óscar Pulido
- Famie Kaufman
- Alfredo Varela
- Carlota Solares
- Otilia Larrañaga
- Maty Huitrón
- Ana Bertha Lepe
- Víctor Alcocer
- Humberto Rodríguez
- María Alejandra

== Bibliography ==
- María Luisa Amador. Cartelera cinematográfica, 1950-1959. UNAM, 1985.
