= Flans =

Mexican pop band

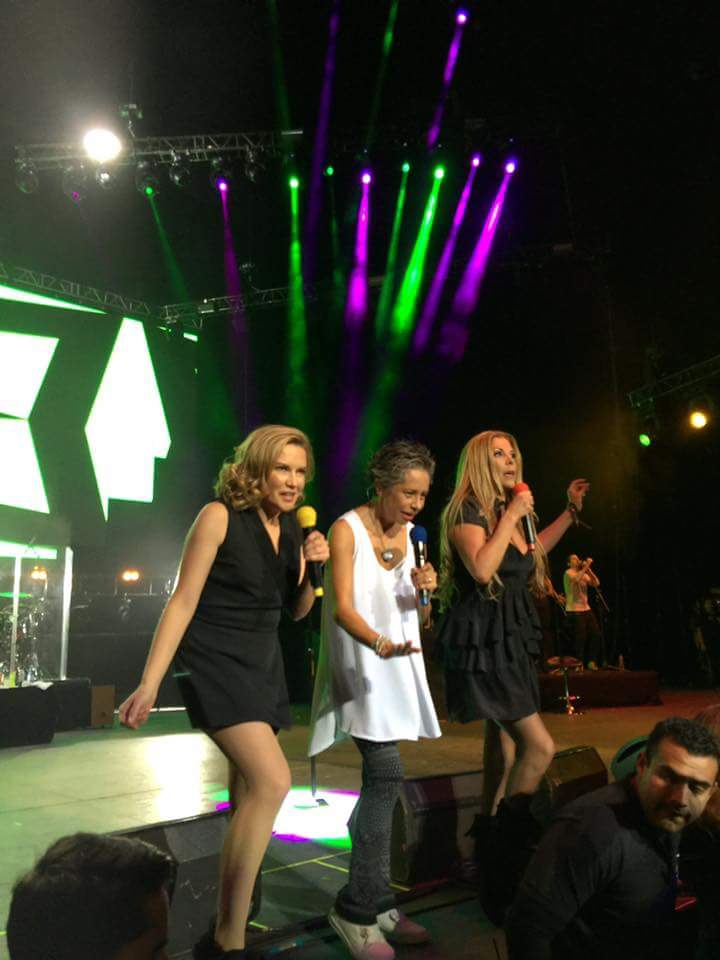

Background information
- Origin: Mexico City, Mexico
- Genres: Latin pop
- Years active: 1985–1990; 1999–2002; 2006; 2013–present
- Labels: Fonovisa: Universal Music; Sony Music
- Members: Ilse; Mimí
- Past members: Ivonne

Flans are a Mexican music group, which enjoyed popularity from the mid-1980s to the mid 2020s. Its members were the singers Ivonne Guevara García, Ilse María Olivo Schweinfurth and Irma Angélica Hernández Ochoa. They were generally known as Ivonne, Ilse, and Mimí.

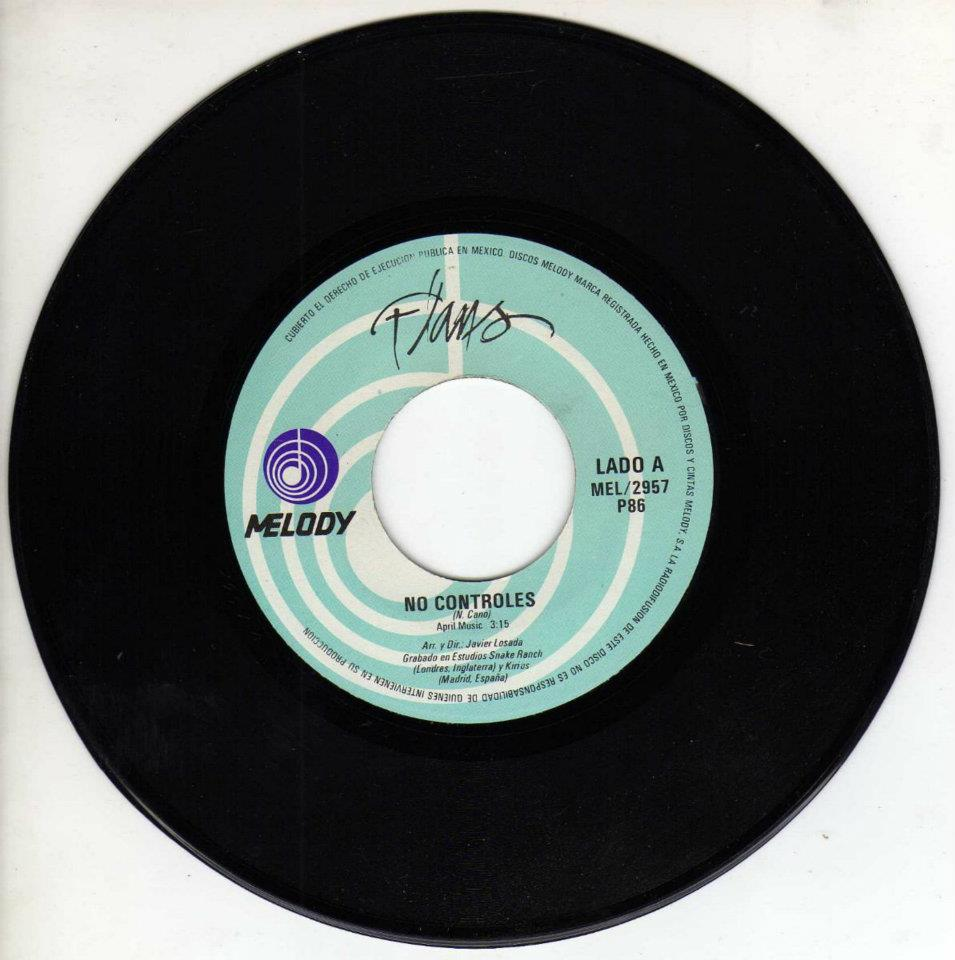
Single "No Controles" 1985

== Career ==
=== Beginnings ===
The three girls were initially cast in the mid-1980s for a TV show to be called Fans, which was to feature chats and sing-alongs with guest stars. When plans for the show fell through, a project was started to turn the girls into a pop music sensation. The group was renamed Flans and their first album, Flans, was launched in 1985. Their style was mainly pop music and ballads although one of their albums (Cuéntamelo Dum-Dum) was somewhat child-oriented.

=== First breakup ===
The group released a new album every year until 1991 when they separated, with a national tour and the release of their "last" album: Adiós. After their separation, Ivonne married and devoted herself to painting; Mimí and Ilse started solo careers, with Mimí also being the host for a TV show.

=== Reunion ===
Rumors of a reunion started in early 1999 and were confirmed with a performance at the Acapulco Milenio Festival, followed by a tour which included several performance at the prestigious Auditorio Nacional in Mexico City. A new album, Hadas, was released later that year and promoted throughout 2000, with the singles Hadas, Tu Eterna Pesadilla, Rufino and Si Te Vas.

Due to a dispute with their former manager Mildred Villafañe over the ownership of the name "Flans", the group changed their name to IIM in 2002 and released a new album featuring three new songs and new versions of their greatest hits.

=== 20 Millas Después ===
In 2006 Ilse, Ivonne and Mimi regrouped for a goodbye tour titled "20 Millas Después". Once again performing under the name Flans, they offered a final concert at Plaza Mexico, in Mexico City. Following the tour, Ilse and Mimi expressed an interest in recording a new album, however Ivonne said she was not interested in being part of the group anymore.

=== Third Reunion ===
In 2011 the three members of the band participated in a photo shoot for MEXICO SUENA, a book showcasing the best in Mexican pop culture. The following year Ilse and Mimi joined forces for the 'Y Si Nosotras...' tour, without Ivonne.

The band performed together again in early 2013, at a special showcase, and announced a new tour 'Hoy Por Ti, Manana Por Mi'. Due to the ongoing dispute with their former manager, the three women are now performing simply as 'Ilse, Ivonne y Mimi'. They toured Mexico, Central America and the United States throughout 2013.

=== Primera Fila ===
In May 2014, Ilse, Ivonne y Mimi announced they would record a Primera Fila album for Sony Music. The album was recorded in Mexico City on June, 12, 2014, and the first single 'Yo No Sería Yo' was released on August 20, 2014. The album titled Primera Fila Flans, presumably because they are mostly known by their original name Flans, was released on September 30, 2014, and a new tour began in Querétaro, México, on October 26, 2014.

== Discography ==
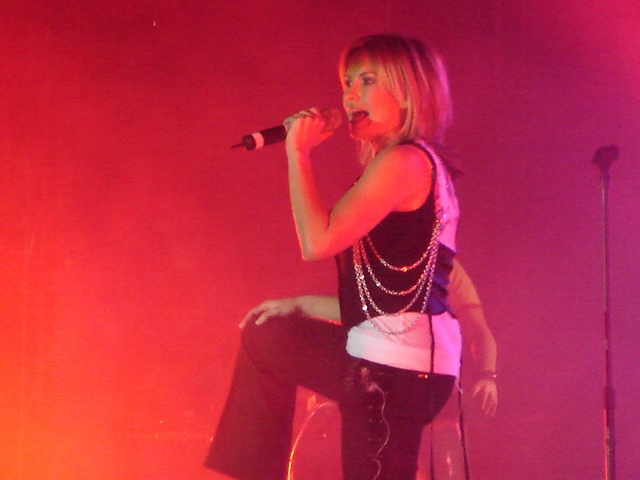
Ilse Olivo Ex Flans

=== Albums ===
- 1985: Flans
- 1986: 20 Millas
- 1987: Luz y Sombra
- 1988: Alma Gemela
- 1989: Cuéntamelo Dum-Dum
- 1990: Adiós
- 1999: Hadas
- 2002: IIM-Ilse, Ivonne, Mimi
- 2014: Primera Fila Flans
- 2022: Inesperado Tour (En Vivo) with Pandora
- 2026: Sin Control
