= Barrera de amor =

Mexican telenovela

- Genre: Telenovela; Romance; Drama
- Created by: Liliana Abud
- Written by: Jaime García Estrada; Orlando Merino; Tere Medina
- Directed by: Raúl Araiza; Rodrigo Zaunbos
- Starring: Yadhira Carrillo; Sergio Reynoso; Alexis Ayala; Raquel Olmedo; Chantal Andere
- Opening theme: Como Duele by Noelia
- Country of origin: Mexico
- Original language: Spanish
- No. of episodes: 155

Production
- Executive producer: Ernesto Alonso
- Producer: Luis Barona
- Production locations: Filming; Televisa San Ángel; Mexico City, Mexico; Locations; Mexico City, Mexico; Aguascalientes, Mexico; Canada
- Cinematography: Víctor Soto; Rogelio Valero
- Camera setup: Multi-camera
- Running time: 21-22 minutes (Episodes 1-20, 136-155); 41-44 minutes (Episodes 21-135)
- Production company: Televisa

Original release
- Network: Canal de las Estrellas
- Release: October 10, 2005 – May 12, 2006

Barrera de amor (English: Barrier of Love) is a Mexican telenovela produced by Ernesto Alonso for Televisa in 2005.

On Monday, October 10, 2005, Canal de las Estrellas started broadcasting Barrera de amor weekdays at 8:00pm, replacing Contra viento y marea. The last episode was broadcast on Friday, May 12, 2006 with La fea más bella replacing it on Monday, May 15, 2006.

Yadhira Carrillo and Sergio Reynoso starred as protagonists, Susana Diazayas and Aarón Díaz starred as co-protagonists, while Raquel Olmedo, Alexis Ayala, Gerardo Murguía, Chantal Andere, Armando Araiza and Alexa Damián starred as antagonists. Manuel Landeta and Norma Herrera starred as stellar performances.

== Plot ==
Maria Teresa "Maité" is a beautiful young woman who is engaged to Luis Antonio. Maité was raised by her aunt, Griselda. Maité's mother died giving birth to her and she has never met her father.

According to people in her town, her father was a foreigner named Jose, who lied to Maité's mother, Eloisa, and had left her pregnant.

Jose promised Eloisa to come back but never did, but he left Eloisa a pendant that belonged to Jose's mother. That pendant is all Maria Teresa has from her father. Maité works at her Aunt Griselda's restaurant as a waitress.

Maité goes to the fair where she is accompanied by Adolfo Valladolid, Adolfo pours sleep powder in Maité's drink leaving her dizzy and uncomfortable.

Adolfo takes advantage of her condition and tries to take her to a motel and rape her when he is stopped by Magdalena (who later in the series becomes one of Maité's best friend and also is one of Adolfo's former lovers).

Eventually, Adolfo rapes Maria Teresa later in the series and Maité becomes pregnant. After Luis Antonio is told by Griselda that Adolfo had sexually harassed Maité, Luis Antonio goes off and looks for Adolfo.

Luis Antonio beats up Adolfo, but Doña Jacinta Valladolid, Adolfo’s mother, sues Luis Antonio. Jacinta pays a few of her workers to attack Luis Antonio in prison.

Adolfo was supposed to marry Manola Linares, but Maité interrupts the wedding and says that Adolfo and Manola cannot be married because Adolfo is the father of her baby.

Maité is forced to marry Adolfo after they threaten to kill Luis Antonio in prison. Because Maité loves and cares for Luis Antonio's children, Daniel and Andres, she agrees to marry the rapist.

Her life is a living hell when she has to live with Adolfo and Jacinta. Then, a few months later, Maité gives birth to a beautiful child, Valeria. Jacinta finds a way to make Maité lose custody of her daughter and Jacinta ends up keeping Valeria.

After Maité was forced by Jacinta to leave, Maité goes to Mexico City, and schemes to recover her daughter and get revenge on Jacinta.

There in Mexico City she runs into Magdalena who is pregnant. Maité and Magdalena grow very fond of each other and become best friends.

Maité works in a restaurant in Mexico City and becomes a friend of Victor, the restaurant owner. Magdalena gives birth to a baby girl, Verónica. Years later; Maité returns to recover her daughter but her plan is a failure.

Magdalena is killed but Verónica watches the murder of her mother. Veronica after that day has more than one personality in her.

Veronica always had loved to play dolls with Vera and Violeta.

After that Vera and Violeta became Verónica's personality. Veronica is also Valeria's half sister. Maité decides to take care of Verónica since Magdalena was a very good friend to her. Maité and Victor adopt Verónica.

After 17 years Maité finally returns to her home town and gets revenge on Jacinta. Valeria and Andrés fall in love without knowing their parents had a relationship.

Later, Valeria and Andrés secretly marry. Valeria finds out that she is pregnant and tries to tell Andres and they get in a fight. She doesn't tell Andrés that she is pregnant.

He finds out and they reunite. Maite and Luis Antonio see each other again and get back together, ended up married.

== Cast ==
=== Main ===
- Yadhira Carrillo as María Teresa "Maité" Galván Martínez
- Sergio Reynoso as Luis Antonio Romero
- Raquel Olmedo as Jacinta López Reyes Vda. de Valladolid
- Alexis Ayala as Federico Valladolid Gómez/Federico Valladolid Gómez
- Chantal Andere as Manola Linares de Zamora
- Norma Herrera as Remedios Gómez
- Gerardo Murguía as Adolfo Valladolid López
- Manuel Landeta as Víctor García Betancourt
- Aarón Díaz as Andrés Romero
- Susana Diazayas as Valeria Valladolid Galván
- Armando Araiza as Rodrigo Zamora Linares
- Alexa Damián as Verónica García Galván/Vera/Violeta

=== Recurring ===
- Alberto Agnesi as Daniel Romero
- Ana Brenda Contreras as Juana "Juanita" Sánchez
- Arturo Posadas as Baldomero Sánchez
- Luis Gimeno as Josefo Maldonado
- Aarón Hernán as José Maldonado
- Juan Peláez as Sergio López Reyes
- Antonio Medellín as Octavio Mendoza
- Emilia Carranza as Josefina Maldonado
- Jorge Vargas as Miguel Franco
- Guillermo Aguilar as Don Elías
- Yolanda Ciani as Doña Norma
- Julio Monterde as Father Anselmo
- Rossana San Juan as Magdalena
- David Ostrosky as Ulises Santillana
- Juan Carlos Casasola as Pancho
- Graciela Bernardos as Griselda Martínez
- Aleyda Gallardo as Martina de Sánchez
- Paty Díaz as Nuria de Romero
- Raymundo Capetillo as Nicolás Linares
- Xavier Marc as Gustavo Zamora
- Rosángela Balbó as Cayetana Linares
- David Ramos as Dionisio Pérez y Pérez
- Ignacio Guadalupe as Teodoro Sánchez
- Mario Cid as Father Raúl
- Rosita Bouchot as Leticia
- Lucy Tovar as Bertha
- Virginia Gimeno as Cleotilde Ramos
- Jerardo Rioja as Rafael Garduño
- Mario del Río as Guillermo
- Elizabeth Aguilar as Jacaranda
- Tere Valadez as Elvira
- Elsy Reyes as Sister María de Jesús
- Ruth Sheinfeld as Mónica
- Antonio Miguel as Nabuco
- Óscar Ferretti as Celerino
- Paola Flores as Evelia
- Joana Benedek as Leonela
- Alejandro Correa as Andrés Romero (child)
- Daniel Berlanga as Daniel Romero (child)
- Miguel Martínez as Andrés Romero (adolescent)
- Carlos Speitzer as Daniel Romero (adolescent)
- Ernesto Bojalil as Cantinero
- María Dolores Oliva as Rosaura
- Claudia Ortega as Reyna
- Antonio Vela as Omar Cardona
- Haydee Navarra as Berenice
- Bertha Kain
- Jorge Ulises Santillana
- Thelma Dorantes
- María Dolores Oliva
- Paola Riquelme
- Pablo Domínguez
- Patricia Ramírez
- Mario Limantour
- Elena de Tellitu
- Allioth Ojeda
- Suhey
- Furby
- Diego Serrano
- Manuel Ojeda
- Scarlet Hernández
- Thania Ortiz
- Andrea García
- Nadia Alejandre

=== Special participation ===
- Federico Pizarro as Pedro Valladolid
- Pedro Armendáriz, Jr. as Don Pedro Valladolid
- Farah Abud as Jacinta López Reyes de Valladolid (young)
- Manuel "Flaco" Ibáñez as Nicanor López
- Adriana Laffan as Ramona Reyes de López
- Cristina Bernal as Remedios Gómez (young)
- Sergio Argueta as José Maldonado (young)
- Daniel Habif as Sergio López Reyes (young)

== Soundtrack ==
Barrera de amor

Soundtrack album by Various artists
- Released: 2005
- Length: 46:34

No.	Title	Performer(s)	Length
1.	"Como Duele (Barrera de Amor)"	Noelia	4:02
2.	"Maldita Soledad"	Aracely Arámbula	3:53
3.	"Lágrimas Rotas"	Vanessa Colaiutta	3:36
4.	"Me Acorde de Ti"	Mijares	3:34
5.	"Solo El y Yo"	Pandora	3:33
6.	"Tan Dentro"	Lourdes Santiago	3:08
7.	"Sin Ti No Soy Nada"	Amaral	4:28
8.	"Hablan"	Ricardo Montaner	4:41
9.	"Como Sería"	Soraya	4:25
10.	"Luna Mágica"	Rocío Banquells	4:13
11.	"Quiero Amanecer Con Alguien"	Daniela Romo	4:07
12.	"Se Me Hizo Fácil"	Consorcio	2:54
Total length:			46:34

== Awards ==
Year	Award	Category	Nominee	Result
2006	Premios Califa de Oro	Highlight Performance	Raquel Olmedo	Won
2006	Premios Califa de Oro	Highlight Performance	Aarón Díaz	Won
2006	Premios Califa de Oro	Highlight Production	Luis Manuel Barona	Won
