= Cicatrices del alma =

Mexican telenovela

- Genre: Telenovela; Drama
- Created by: Lindy Giacoman
- Written by: Eric Vonn; Liliana Abud
- Directed by: Alfredo Gurrola
- Starring: Norma Herrera; Germán Robles; Gregorio Casal; Rebeca Rambal; José Elías Moreno; Delia Casanova
- Opening theme: Perdóname by Erika Buenfil
- Country of origin: Mexico
- Original language: Spanish
- No. of episodes: 128

Production
- Executive producer: Eugenio Cobo
- Production locations: Mexico City, Mexico
- Running time: 30 minutes
- Production company: Televisa

Original release
- Network: Canal de las Estrellas
- Release: September 29, 1986 – March 25, 1987

Related
- Marionetas; Cómo duele callar; Piel de otoño (2005) Cicatrices (2005 Film)

Cicatrices del alma (English title:Scars of the soul) is a Mexican telenovela produced by Eugenio Cobo for Televisa in 1986. It is an original story by Lindy Giacoman and adapted by Eric Vonn and Liliana Abud. It starred Norma Herrera, Germán Robles, Gregorio Casal, Rebeca Rambal and José Elías Moreno Jr.

== Plot ==
Elvira is an unhappy woman who has endured for years mistreatment and humiliation of her cruel husband Octavio, in addition to suffering the contempt of his ungrateful children Lucila and Alfredo. This has meant that over time Elvira has become weak and insecure woman. But life will give a new opportunity for her to be happy when she receives a large inheritance and open the doors to a new love.

== Cast ==
- Norma Herrera as Elvira Contreras de Rivas Castilla
- Germán Robles as Imanol Fonseca de Landeros
- Gregorio Casal as Octavio Rivas Castilla Albanera
- Rebeca Rambal as Lucila Rivas Castilla Contreras
- José Elías Moreno Jr. as Alfredo Rivas Castilla Contreras
- Delia Casanova as Blanca Andrade Mendoza
- Juan Carlos Serrán as Sandro Valencia Ordoñez
- Magda Karina as Graciela
- Lucero Lander as Susana
- Luis Couturier as Federico
- Edgardo Gazcón as Francisco
- América Gabriel as Inés
- Socorro Bonilla as Sister Refugio
- Héctor Ortega as Father René
- Susana Kamini as Eleonora
- Rosario Gálvez as Pastora
- Beatriz Moreno as Panchita
- Abraham Stavans as Ramiro
- Iliana Ilisecas as Martha
- Ari Telch as Samuel
- Jaime Lozano as Martín
- Carmen Cortés as Rosa
- Rafael del Villar as Marco
- Rosa María Morales as Bertha
- Lilia Sixtos as María
- Irlanda Mora as Montserrat
- Azucena Rodríguez as Mother Superior
- Mario Alberto León as Pedro
- Antonio Farré as Darío
- Isaura Espinoza as Diana
- Elizabeth Dupeyrón as María José
- Aurora Molina as Dolores
- Armando Calvo as Don Paco
- Úrsula Álvarez as Natalia
- Antonio Farré as David
- Alda Rolán as Pilar
- Miguel Rodarte as Javier
- Susana Kamini as Eleonora
- Ricardo Cervantes
