= Private Secretary (film) =

1952 film

- Directed by: José Díaz Morales
- Written by: José Díaz Morales; Carlos Sampelayo
- Produced by: Modesto Pascó
- Starring: Emilio Tuero; Alma Delia Fuentes; Carlos Martínez Baena
- Cinematography: Ezequiel Carrasco
- Edited by: Fernando Martínez
- Music by: Gonzalo Curiel
- Production company: Argel Films
- Distributed by: Clasa-Mohme
- Release date: 29 October 1952
- Running time: 89 minutes
- Country: Mexico
- Language: Spanish

Private Secretary (Spanish: Secretaria particular) is a 1952 Mexican romantic drama film directed by José Díaz Morales and starring Emilio Tuero, Alma Delia Fuentes and Carlos Martínez Baena. It was shot at the Clasa Studios in Mexico City. The film's sets were designed by the art director Francisco Marco Chillet.

== Cast ==
- Emilio Tuero as Fernando Quiroz
- Alma Delia Fuentes as Elena Reynaldos
- Carlos Martínez Baena as Don Juan Reynaldos
- Angélica María as Venus
- Jorge Casanova as Lalito
- Fernando Galiana as Miguel
- María Gentil Arcos as Catalina
- Armando Velasco as Señor Guillén
- Otilia Larrañaga as Secretaria
- Roberto Spriu as Agente policía
- Felipe Montoya as Don Félix
- Lidia Franco as Doña Cuca
- Rodolfo Calvo as Sr. Iriarte
- Alfredo Varela padre as Don León

== Bibliography ==
- Amador, María Luisa. Cartelera cinematográfica, 1950-1959. UNAM, 1985.
- Hershfield, Joanne; Maciel, David R. Mexico's Cinema: A Century of Film and Filmmakers. Rowman & Littlefield Publishers, 1999.
