= Un sábado más =

- Directed by: Sergio Véjar
- Written by: Kiki Galindo Ripoll
- Produced by: Daniel Galindo
- Starring: Pedrito Fernández; Tatiana; José Elías Moreno; Adela Noriega
- Music by: Chucho Zarzosa
- Release date: January 28, 1988
- Country: Mexico
- Language: Spanish

Un sábado más (Another Saturday) is a Mexican motion picture categorized as action and drama. The film was released in 1985.

== Plot ==
This Mexican movie featured Pedro Fernández (when he was still known as "Pedrito") in the role of the protagonist Martin, with Tatiana in the role of Tania.

This is a story of a humble boy, Martin (Pedrito Fernández), son of an alcoholic, who lives harassed, humiliated, confronted, by a rich rival (Diego) who even has as a girlfriend, the girl Martin likes, Tania .

Diego, a rich, nasty young man leads the local motorcycle gang, has Tania as his girlfriend at the start of the movie, but she soon falls for Martin, a poor kid with nothing but a beat-up old motorcycle.

Diego doesn't like this, which leads he and Martin into some fights, and finally Diego challenges Martin to a motocross race. Martin, disappointed in life, begins to give up until another teenager, a paralytic due to a motorcycle accident, encourages him to, in a few words, participate in a race where he will compete with his rival.

Both stars, Pedro Fernandez and Tatiana were popular singers so the movie contains their music throughout. Pedro released the album "Es Un Sábado Más" in the same year.

== Cast ==
- Pedrito Fernández - Martin
- Tatiana - Tania
- José Elías Moreno - El grande / Isauro
- Adela Noriega - Lucía
- Gilberto Trujillo - Diego
- Jorge Pais - Martin's father
- Gabriela Hassel - Corina
- Jaime Santos
- Mauricio Mendez
- Alfredo Garcia Marquez
- Roberto Cabrera
