= Pasión gitana =

Mexican telenovela

- Genre: Telenovela
- Written by: Caridad Bravo Adams
- Directed by: Xavier Rojas
- Country of origin: Mexico
- Original language: Spanish

Production
- Producer: Ernesto Alonso

Original release
- Network: Telesistema Mexicano
- Release: 1968

Pasión gitana, is a Mexican telenovela produced by Televisa and originally transmitted by Telesistema Mexicano.

== Cast ==
- Teresa Velázquez as Gitana Tere
- Aldo Monti as Conde Rolando de Monforte
- Luis Aragón
- Aarón Hernán
- Norma Herrera
- Miguel Manzano
- Gilda Mirós
- Fanny Schiller
- Miguel Suárez
- Jorge Vargas as Mario
- Aurora Cortés
- Mario Casillas
- Jorge Casanova
