= Alma Delia Fuentes =

Mexican actress (1937–2017)

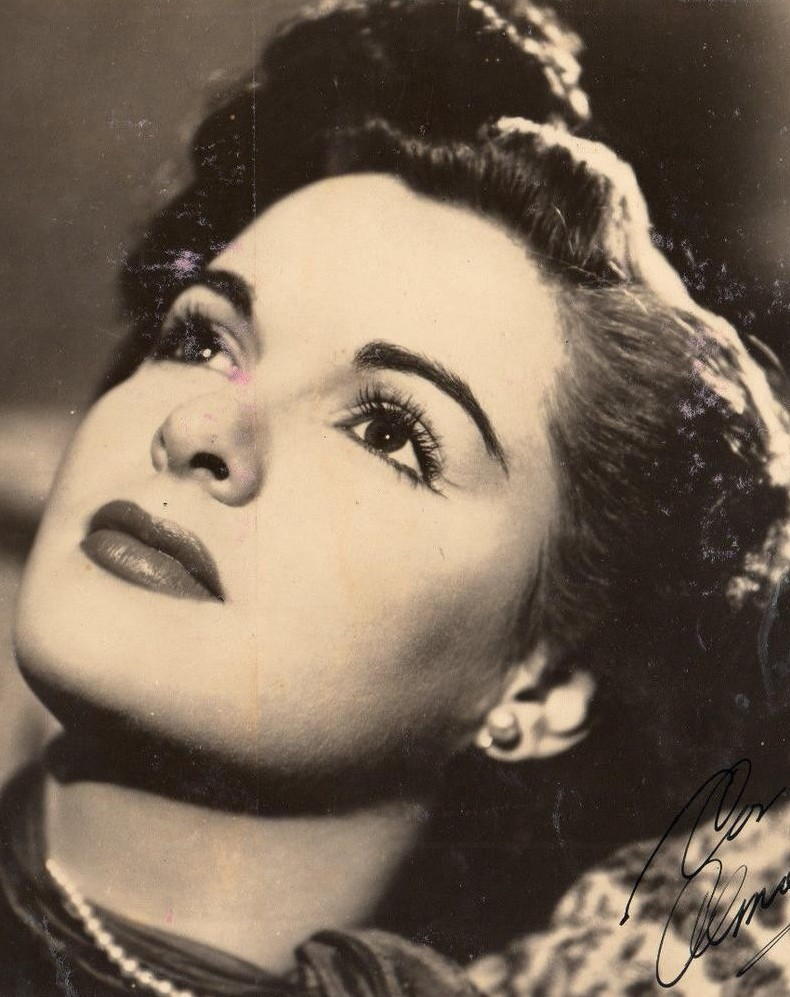
- Fuentes, c. 1953
- Born: Alma Delia Susana Fuentes González; 22 January 1937; Mexico City, Mexico
- Died: April 2, 2017 (aged 80); Mexico City, Mexico
- Other names: Alma Delia Susana Fuentes Gonzalez
- Occupation: Actress

Alma Delia Susana Fuentes González (22 January 1937 – 2 April 2017) was a Mexican actress of film, television, and theatre.

== Career ==
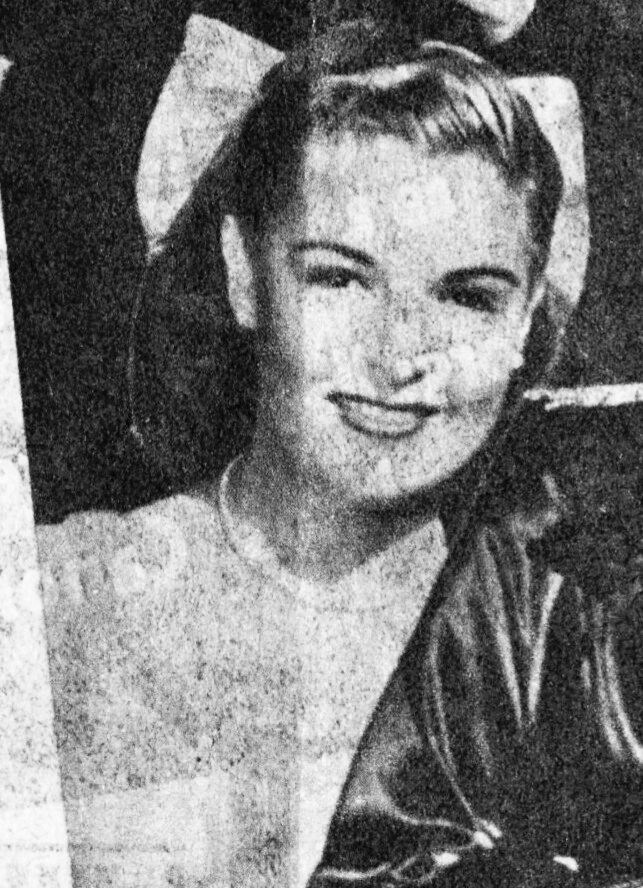
Alma Delia Fuentes in 1951

Fuentes began her career as a child actress. In 1951, she was nominated for an Ariel Award for Best Youth Performance for her role in Luis Buñuel's Los Olvidados. In the 1960s, Fuentes debuted in television and also starred in films as the leading lady of such popular performers as Cantinflas, Demetrio González, Antonio Aguilar, Eulalio González "Piporro", and Viruta y Capulina.

== Filmography ==
- Symphony of Life (1946)
- The Golden Boat (1947)
- The Flesh Commands (1948)
- A Family Like Many Others (1949)
- Los olvidados (1950)
- If I Were Just Anyone (1950)
- Full Speed Ahead (1951)
- My Wife and the Other One (1952)
- Private Secretary (1952)
- The Three Perfect Wives (1953)
- Canción de cuna (1953)
- The Extra (1962)
- Los cuatro Juanes (1966)
- La cigüeña distraída (1966)
- Lauro Puñales (1969)
