= Otilia Larrañaga =

Mexican dancer and actress (1931–2021)

- Born: Otilia Larrañaga Villarreal; 3 November 1931; Mexico City, Mexico
- Died: 6 October 2021 (aged 89); Mexico City, Mexico
- Occupations: Dancer; actress
- Spouse: Antonio Aguilar (m. 1958; div. 1959)
- Partner: Rogelio Guerra (1968-1974)
- Children: 1

Otilia Larrañaga Villarreal (3 November 1931 – 6 October 2021) was a Mexican dancer and actress who participated in classic Mexican films and also on stage and television.

== Biography ==
Larrañaga studied dance with her uncle Ignacio Larrañaga and later ballet with Lettie H. Carroll. From 1947 to 1950, she was a member of Carroll's dance group and participated in the seasons of the Palacio de Bellas Artes' National Opera in Mexico City.

A notable dancer by the time she was 15, she began her film career in the early 1950s with small roles in Secretaria particular (1952) and No te ofendas, Beatriz (1953).

One of her first successes was her performance in the play Ángeles y payasos (1952), directed by Luz Alba at the Teatro Esperanza Iris. The theater critic Armando de María y Campos wrote that "the best performance rests in Otilia Larrañaga, as an actress and dancer, beautiful in figure and exquisite in feeling. Her future is splendid, whatever path she chooses".

She met her first husband, singer and actor Antonio "Tony" Aguilar, at the XEW-TV station in 1952. Larrañaga and Aguilar performed together in the films Mi papá tuvo la culpa (1953) and Reventa de esclavas (1954).

She obtained her first starring role in the film La flecha envenenada (1957) with Gastón Santos.

In 1957, she received a nomination for the Ariel Award for Best Youth Performance for the film Caras nuevas (1956).

She married Aguilar in 1958, but the couple divorced the following year. In 1968 she began a relationship with actor Rogelio Guerra, with whom she had a daughter named Hildegard. The couple never married and separated in 1974.

== Filmography ==
- Private Secretary (1952)
- No te ofendas, Beatriz (1953)
- Mi papá tuvo la culpa (1953)
- The Price of Living (1954)
- Reventa de esclavas
- Maldita ciudad (1954)
- Las viudas del cha-cha-cha (1955)
- Caras nuevas
- La flecha envenenada
- La locura del rock and roll
