= Rosario Gálvez =

Mexican actress (1926–2015)

- Born: Rosario Doblado Gálvez; October 15, 1926; Mexico City, Mexico
- Died: September 17, 2015 (aged 88); Mexico City, Mexico
- Occupation: Actress
- Spouse: Luis Aguilar (1957–1997)
- Children: Roberto, Luis Roberto
- Awards: TVyNovelas Best Leading Actress (1988)

Rosario Gálvez (October 15, 1926 – September 17, 2015) was a Mexican actress. She was married to Luis Aguilar, "El Gallo Giro", one of the icons of the golden age of Mexican cinema, from 1957 until his death in 1997.

== Career ==
Rosario Gálvez became known in the 1950s for acting in several films such as Salón de belleza, Cuando me vaya, and Para siempre. In the 1960s she acted in films such as El correo del norte, La máscara de la muerte, and Los cuatro Juanes. In 1965 she appeared in her first telenovela: El abismo. In the 1970s, Gálvez acted in the films Cristo 70 and Mamá Dolores, while also appearing in telenovelas such as Ven conmigo and Doménica Montero.

During the 1980s, she acted in several telenovelas, such as Bodas de odio and Victoria. In the 1990s, she acted in the telenovelas Prisionera de amor and Mi pequeña traviesa, and in 1997 she returned to film in Reclusorio. Her last performance was in 2000 in an episode of the television series Mujer, Casos de la Vida Real. That same year, Rosario Gálvez wrote a book about her childhood and her marriage to Luis Aguilar, who died in 1997. The inspiration for that book, ¿Cuentas de un rosario?, was the death of her husband, which was very painful for her. Gálvez had already retired from acting for several years. She died from pneumonia in Mexico City at age 88.

== Filmography ==
=== Films ===
- Beauty Salon (1951) .... Elvira
- Sentenciado a muerte (1951)
- Amor, qué malo eres! (1953)
- Cuando me vaya (1954)
- El joven Juárez (1954)
- La entrega (1954) .... Friend of Julia
- Maldita ciudad (1954)
- ¿Mujer... o fiera? (1954)
- Los paquetes de Paquita (1955)
- La gaviota (1955) .... Leonor
- Para siempre (1955) .... Susi
- La culpa de los hombres (1955)
- La Diana cazadora (1957)
- Sabrás que te quiero (1958)
- Ando volando bajo (1959)
- Flor de canela (1959)
- Mi niño, mi caballo y yo (1959)
- El correo del norte (1960)
- La máscara de la muerte (1961)
- Tres tristes tigres (1961)
- La trampa mortal (1962)
- Atrás de las nubes (1962) .... Married woman
- Los cuatro Juanes (1966) .... Sabina
- El comandante Furia (1966)
- La puerta y la mujer del carnicero (1968) .... Party guest (segment "La puerta")
- La marcha de Zacatecas (1969)
- Cristo 70 (1970)
- Mama Dolores (1971)
- Reclusorio (1997) .... Judge (segment "Eutanasia o asesinato")

=== Telenovelas ===
- El abismo (1965)
- La búsqueda (1966)
- Deborah (1967)
- La tormenta (1967) .... Carmen Serdán
- Pequeñeces (1971) .... Isabel
- El carruaje (1972) .... Rosalía Cano
- Extraño en su pueblo (1973) .... Irene
- Ven conmigo (1975) .... Laura
- Doménica Montero (1978) .... Angélica
- Vamos juntos (1979) .... Catalina
- Cancionera (1980) .... Amparo
- La búsqueda (1982)
- Bodas de odio (1983) .... Paula de Mendoza
- Cicatrices del alma (1986) .... Pastora
- Yesenia (1987) .... Amparo
- Victoria (1987) .... Sofía Williams y Montero (1987-1988)
- Un rostro en mi pasado (1990) .... Pacita
- Atrapada (1991) .... Tomasa (1991-1992)
- La sonrisa del Diablo (1992) .... Lena San Román
- Tenías que ser tú (1992-1993)
- Prisionera de amor (1994) .... Eugenia
- Bajo un mismo rostro (1995) .... Luciana de Gorostiaga
- Mi pequeña traviesa (1997-1998) .... Sofía

=== Television series ===
- Mujer, Casos de la Vida Real (5 episodes, 1997–2000)

== Awards ==
Event	Category	Telenovela	Result
1984 TVyNovelas Awards	Best Antagonist Actress	Bodas de odio	Nominated
1988 TVyNovelas Awards	Best Leading Actress	Victoria	Winner
