= En busca del paraíso (1968 TV series) =

Mexican telenovela

- Genre: Telenovela
- Country of origin: Mexico
- Original language: Spanish

Original release
- Network: Telesistema Mexicano
- Release: 1968

En busca del paraíso is a Mexican telenovela that debuted in 1968 and was directed by Raúl Araiza.

== Broadcast ==
In January 1969, the series was listed in the Mexico City schedule for XEW-TV (Channel 2), part of Telesistema Mexicano.

== Cast ==
- Guillermo Murray
- Jacqueline Andere
- Norma Herrera
- Miguel Macía
