= Deborah (TV series) =

- Genre: Telenovela
- Created by: Caridad Bravo Adams
- Starring: Cast
- Country of origin: Mexico
- Original language: Spanish

Original release
- Network: Telesistema Mexicano
- Release: 1967

Deborah, is a Mexican telenovela produced by Televisa and originally transmitted by Telesistema Mexicano.

== Cast ==
- Norma Herrera
- Alicia Montoya
- Rosario Gálvez
- Guillermo Murray
- Lucy Gallardo
- Germán Robles
- Jorge Lavat
