= Alma rebelde =

Mexican telenovela

- Genre: Telenovela; Romance; Drama
- Written by: Hilda Morales de Allous
- Directed by: Martha Luna; Karina Duprez; Miguel Córcega
- Starring: Lisette Morelos; Eduardo Verástegui; Aracely Arámbula; Otto Sirgo; Ana Martín
- Opening theme: Alma rebelde by Grupo Límite
- Country of origin: Mexico
- Original language: Spanish
- No. of episodes: 95

Production
- Executive producer: Nicandro Díaz González
- Producer: Ignacio Sada Madero
- Production locations: Televisa San Ángel; Mexico City, Mexico
- Camera setup: Multi-camera
- Running time: 41-44 minutes
- Production company: Televisa

Original release
- Network: Canal de las Estrellas
- Release: July 19 – November 19, 1999

Related
- La indomable (1987)

Alma rebelde (English: Rebellious Soul) is a Mexican telenovela produced by Nicandro Díaz González for Televisa in 1999. It is a remake of 1987 Mexican telenovela La indomable.

On Monday, July 19, 1999, Canal de las Estrellas started broadcasting Alma rebelde weekdays at 7:00pm, replacing Amor gitano. The last episode was broadcast on Friday, November 19, 1999, with DKDA: Sueños de juventud replacing it the following Monday.

Lisette Morelos and Eduardo Verástegui starred as protagonists, while Karla Álvarez and Ariel López Padilla starred as antagonists. The leading actress Ana Martín starred as stellar performance.

== Plot ==
The story follows Ana Cristina, whose relationships are affected by conflicts involving pride, love, and deception. Ana Christina is portrayed as arrogant and accustomed to getting her own way, often without regard for the feelings of others.

She is about to be married to Damián when she discovers that he is unfaithful to her. Ana Cristina decides to take revenge on her fiancé and her own father, who has sided with Damián for reasons of interest. To this end, Ana Cristina ruthlessly manipulates Emiliano, a civil engineer who is newly arrived in Los Arrecifes and is immediately enamoured of her.

Ana Cristina deceives him, but faces consequences for her actions. Through these experiences, Ana Cristina learns that remorse alone does not resolve a broken heart, but requires love and sacrifice.

== Cast ==
- Lisette Morelos as Ana Cristina Rivera Hill de Hernandez
- Eduardo Verástegui as Emiliano Hernandez/Mauro Expósito
- Karla Álvarez as Rita Álvarez
- Ariel López Padilla as Damián Montoro
- Ana Martín as Clara Hernández
- Arleth Terán as Odette Fuentes Cano Rivera Hill
- Aracely Arámbula as Maria Elena Hernández
- Otto Sirgo as Marcelo Rivera Hill
- Julio Alemán as Diego Pereira
- Marisol Santacruz as Laiza Montemayor
- Gustavo Rojo as Octavio Fuentes Cano
- Mariagna Prats as Clemencia de Rivera Hill
- Elizabeth Dupeyrón as Pamela de Villareal
- Juan Pablo Gamboa as Alessandro Villareal
- Evita Muñoz "Chachita" as Berenice de Avila
- Frances Ondiviela as Isabel Chabela Montoro
- Bibelot Mansur as Clara Hernández (young)
- Adriana Lavat as Juanita #1
- Claudia Ortega as Juanita #2
- Raúl Padilla "Chóforo" as Narciso #1
- Sergio Ramos "El Comanche" as Narciso #2
- Alejandra Procuna as Iris de Villareal
- Mayrín Villanueva as Paula
- Raúl Magaña as Roman Palacios
- Khotan Fernández as Valentino
- Oscar Morelli as Evaristo
- Socorro Avelar as Nana Chayo
- Carmelita González as Simona
- Elsa Cardenas as Natalia - Friend of Ana Cristina
- Josefina Echanove as Salomé
- Silvia Caos as Martina Soriano
- Isabel Martínez "La Tarabilla" as Evangelina
- Eduardo Antonio as El Huesos
- Luis Fernando Madriz as Grillo
- Ricardo Hernández as Zeus
- Marieth Rodríguez as Almudena
- Marcia Coutino as Federica
- Paty Álvarez as Felicia
- Kelchie Arizmendi as Graciela
- Gabriel Soto as Vladimir Montenegro
- Paulo Quevedo as Ariel
- Edgar Ponce as Chente
- Roberto Assad Martinez as Junior
- Andres Gutierrez as Mario
- Maria Esther Paulino as Sandy
- Dominika Paleta as Graciela
- Guillermo Rivas "El Borras" as Malas Pulgas
- Leonorilda Ochoa as Chonita
- Andrea Lagunes as Angela "Angelita" Montoro Montemayor
- Susana Lozano as Sandra de Palacios
- Claudia Silva as Amada Montemayor

== Awards ==
Year	Award	Category	Nominee	Result
2000	18th TVyNovelas Awards	Best Antagonist Actress	Karla Álvarez	Nominated
