= Lisette Morelos =

Mexican actress and singer

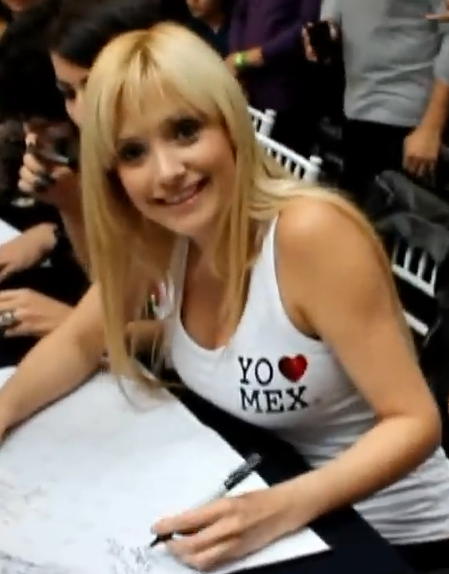
- Born: May 21, 1978 (age 48); Mexico City, Mexico
- Occupations: Actress, singer, model
- Years active: 1996-present
- Spouse: John Bainbridge (2005-2012)

Lisette Morelos (Spanish pronunciation: [liˈset moˈɾelos]; born Lisette Garcia Morelos-Zaragoza on May 21, 1978, in Mexico City, Mexico) is a Mexican actress, singer and model. She started her career at a young age. She attended the Centro de Educación Artística (CEA). Her first Telenovela was at the age of 17 in Tu y Yo with Maribel Guardia and Joan Sebastian.

She lives in Canada. She has been involved in Telenovelas, with Miguel de León, Eduardo Verastegui, Eduardo Capetillo, Gabriel Soto, and many more. She has also appeared in many shows.

== Filmography ==
Television
Year	Title	Role	Notes
1996	Tú y yo	Linda	Recurring role
1997	El secreto de Alejandra	Carola Lavalle	Recurring role
1998-1999	Camila	Ingrid Valverde	Recurring role
1999	Alma rebelde	Ana Cristina Rivera Hill Hernández	Lead role
2000-2001	Carita de ángel	Cecilia Santos de Larios	Lead role
2001-2002	Mujer, casos de la vida real	Various roles	5 episodes
2002	¡Vivan los niños!	Adriana Espinoza	Recurring role
2004	Ángel rebelde	Natasha Covarrubias	Recurring role
2007- 2018	Red Hood and the Outlaws	Anna Abraxis/Alessa/Black Cat	Co-lead role
2009	Alma indomable	Mónica Sorrento	Recurring role
2010	Niña de mi corazón	Moíra Gasca	Lead antagonist
2010	Aurora	Blanca Ponce de León	Co-lead role
2012	Infames	Sol Fuentes	Lead role
2013	Fortuna	Alicia Altamirano	Lead role
2014	La impostora	Blanca Guerrero / Victoria San Marino "La Impostora"	Lead role
2016	Un camino hacia el destino	Amelia Altamirano de Peréz	Co-lead role
2018	Por amar sin ley	Mariana Gallegos	3 episodes
2021	¿Qué le pasa a mi familia?	Ofelia del Olmo Gascón de Iturbide	Lead antagonist

Film
Year	Title	Role
2017	Me gusta, pero me asusta	Martina

== Awards and nominations ==
Year	Awards	Category	Telenovela	Result
2000	Premios TVyNovelas	Best Young Lead Actress	Alma Rebelde	Nominated
2011	Kids Choice Awards México	Favorite Villain	Niña de mi Corazon	Nominated
