= Prisionera de amor =

Mexican telenovela

- Genre: Telenovela; Romance; Drama
- Created by: Inés Rodena
- Written by: Carlos Romero; Dolores Ortega; Valeria Phillips; Carmen Múñoz de Cote; Luz Orlín
- Directed by: Pedro Damián; Luis Vélez
- Starring: Maribel Guardia; Saúl Lisazo; Gabriela Goldsmith; Rafael Baledón; Eduardo Noriega; Julieta Egurrola; Alberto Inzúa
- Theme music composer: Jesús Medel; Jorge Olvera; Miguel Angel Garrocho
- Opening theme: Prisionera de amor by Rocío Banquells
- Country of origin: Mexico
- Original language: Spanish
- No. of episodes: 85

Production
- Executive producer: Pedro Damián
- Cinematography: Carlos Sánchez Zuñiga
- Running time: 41-44 minutes
- Production company: Televisa

Original release
- Network: Canal de las Estrellas
- Release: March 28 – July 22, 1994

Related
- Más allá del puente; Volver a Empezar; Ileana (1977) Amalia Batista (1983)

Prisionera de amor (English title: Prisoner of love) is a Mexican telenovela produced by Pedro Damián for Televisa in 1994.

Maribel Guardia and Saúl Lisazo starred as protagonists, while Julieta Egurrola, Lorena Meritano, Rosario Gálvez, Gabriela Goldsmith, Sebastián Ligarde and Fernando Ciangherotti starred as antagonists.

== Plot ==
Cristina Carbajal is a woman who has paid an unjust sentence in jail. She was wrongly blamed for the death of her husband. After ten years, she gets out of prison for good behavior.

Her daughters, Karina and Rosita, who were five and one year old when Cristina was imprisoned, are now 15 and 11 years old. They have been brought up by their father's aunt and uncle, Eloísa and Braulio Monasterios.

The Monasterios hate Cristina. They believe that she is responsible for their nephew's death. The Monasterios have told the girls that they are orphans.

== Cast ==
- Maribel Guardia as Cristina Carbajal/Florencia Rondán
- Saúl Lisazo as José Armando Vidal
- Gabriela Goldsmith as Isaura Durán
- Rafael Baledón as Braulio Monasterios #1
- Eduardo Noriega as Braulio Monastaerios #2
- Julieta Egurrola as Flavia Monasterios
- Alberto Inzúa as Gastón Monasterios
- Irán Eory as Eloísa
- Karla Álvarez as Karina Monasterios
- Gerardo Hemmer as Alex Monasterios
- Alix as Sonia Monasterios
- Alisa Vélez as Rosita Monasterios
- Ariel López Padilla as Federico Monasterios
- Rosario Gálvez as Eugenia
- Leticia Calderón as Consuelo
- Eduardo Santamarina as Rodrigo Miranda
- Carmen Amezcua as Gisela
- Rodolfo Arias as Efrén
- Álvaro Carcaño as Pascual
- Juan Felipe Preciado as Albino
- Lorena Meritano as Esther
- Fernando Ciangherotti as Augusto Bianchi
- Sebastián Ligarde as Gerardo Ávila
- Juan Carlos Muñoz as Ángel
- Roberto Gutiérrez as Oswaldo Serrano
- Silvia Derbez as Chayo
- Alpha Acosta as Mariana
- Fabiola Campomanes as Lucila
- Leonardo García as Óscar
- Mané Macedo as Delia Escobedo
- Patricia Martínez as Eufemia
- Irma Torres as Librada
- Georgina Pedret as Luz
- Mónica Dionne as Teté
- Sergio Jiménez as Dr. Santos
- Javier Gómez as Humberto
- Alma Rosa Añorve
- Beatriz Ambriz
- José Salomé Brito
- Dionisio
- Bárbara Eibenshutz
- Maximiliano Hernández
- Claudia Inchaurregui
- Thelma Dorantes
- José Amador
- Kala Ruiz
- Carlos Águila
- Aracely Arámbula

== Awards and nominations ==
Year	Award	Category	Nominee	Result
1995	13th TVyNovelas Awards	Best Antagonist Actress	Julieta Egurrola	Nominated
1995	13th TVyNovelas Awards	Best Young Lead Actress	Karla Álvarez	Nominated
