= El milagro de vivir =

Mexican telenovela

- Genre: Telenovela
- Created by: Fernanda Villeli
- Directed by: Raúl Araiza
- Starring: Angélica María; Fernando Allende
- Opening theme: "Milagro de vivir" by Angélica María
- Country of origin: Mexico
- Original language: Spanish

Production
- Executive producer: Ernesto Alonso

Original release
- Network: Televisión Independiente de México
- Release: 1975

El milagro de vivir is a Mexican telenovela produced by Ernesto Alonso for Televisión Independiente de México in 1975.

== Cast ==
- Angélica María as Aura Velasco
- Fernando Allende as Fred
- Ana Martín as Jenny Gordon
- Lilia Prado as Estela
- Rita Macedo as María
- Norma Herrera as Leonora
- Lucy Gallardo as Lucia
- Nubia Martí as Mili
- Silvia Pasquel as Hortencia Alvarado
- Raúl Ramírez as Carlos Alvarado
- José Alonso as Hector Alvarado
- Angélica Vale as baby Alejandra
- Alberto Vazquez as Luis Alvarado
- Mario Casillas as Alejandro Alvarado
- Martha Patricia as Rita
