= Maldita ciudad =

- Directed by: Ismael Rodríguez
- Written by: Ismael Rodríguez (screenplay), Carlos Orellana (screenplay)
- Produced by: Ismael Rodríguez
- Starring: Carlos Orellana, Fernando Soler, Anita Blanch
- Cinematography: Ignacio Torres
- Edited by: Fernando Martínez
- Music by: Rosalío Ramírez
- Release date: September 17, 1954
- Running time: 90 minutes
- Country: Mexico
- Language: Spanish

Maldita ciudad (Damn City) is a 1954 Mexican drama film, produced, written and directed by Ismael Rodríguez, and starring Carlos Orellana, Fernando Soler and Anita Blanch.

== Story ==
A book writer from a village offers his book to a film producer, who is looking for a places to set film's scenes. Book writer moves to a big city where he faces problems which make him to regret these events.

== Cast ==
- Fernando Soler - Dr. Antonio Arenas
- Anita Blanch - Doña María
- Carlos Orellana - Lucas
- Sara Guasch - Margot
- Carolina Barret - Josefina
- Felipe Montoya - Sacerdote
- Amparo Arozamena - Amalia
- Rosario Gálvez
- Otilia Larrañaga
- Javier de la Parra - Ramírez
- Ernesto Finance - Dr. Robles
- Héctor Mateos - Padre de Chicho
- Norma Lazareno
- Eduardo Alcaraz - Director cinematográfico
- Jorge Landeta - Los chamacones
- Jaime Jiménez Pons - Los chamacones (as Jaime J. Pons)
- Carlos Jiménez - Los chamacones
