= Muñeca rota =

Mexican telenovela

- Genre: Telenovela
- Created by: Miguel Sabido & Tessie G. Picazo
- Based on: Marilyn Monroe’s Life
- Written by: Tessie G. Picazo
- Directed by: Raúl Araiza Sr
- Starring: Dulce
- Country of origin: Mexico
- Original language: Spanish
- No. of seasons: 1
- No. of episodes: 32

Production
- Executive producer: Guillermo Diazayas
- Production company: Televisa

Original release
- Network: Canal de las Estrellas
- Release: October 1978

Muñeca rota, is a Mexican telenovela produced by Guillermo Diazayas for Televisa in 1978. It is based on the life of Marilyn Monroe.

== Cast ==
- Dulce as Norma
- Jorge Ortiz de Pinedo
- Norma Herrera as Gladys
- Bertha Moss
- Ruben Rojo
- Erika Carrasco
- Beatriz Sheridan
- Enrique Pontón
- Graciela Doring
- Angélica Vale
