= María Bonita (TV series) =

- Created by: David Sanchez Juliao
- Developed by: RTI Colombia
- Directed by: Carlos Duplat
- Starring: Adela Noriega; Fernando Allende; Julio Cesar Luna
- Opening theme: "Maria Bonita", performed by Adela Noriega
- Ending theme: "Maria Bonita", performed by Adela Noriega
- Country of origin: Colombia
- Original language: Spanish
- No. of episodes: 93

Production
- Executive producer: Hugo León Ferrer
- Producer: Oscar Guarin
- Production location: Colombia
- Camera setup: Multi-camera
- Running time: 40 minutes

Original release
- Network: RTI Colombia; Telemundo
- Release: May 22, 1995 – February 27, 1996

María Bonita (Pretty Maria) is a 1995 Colombian telenovela which starred Adela Noriega, Fernando Allende, and Julio Cesar Luna.

== Story ==
This story develops in Isla Fuerte, a Caribbean island where Augusto Santos is in his third term as President. The small country lives on tourism and the production of bananas.

María Bonita, a Mexican Artist was invited to the President's 60th birthday. She would be stranded on the island forever and find the love of her life named Jose Santos.

He is the illegitimate son of the president, who hates his father for not recognizing him as a son. Jose Santos promised to take revenge on his father, María will come between them.

== Cast ==
- Adela Noriega – María Reynoso
- Fernando Allende – Jose Santos Ramand
- Julio Cesar Luna – Augustino Santos Yarzagaray
- Juan Pablo Shuk – Rodrigo Santos
- Flora Martínez – Imelda Santos
- Margalida Castro – Libia Santos de Carvajales
- Bruno Diaz – Calancho
- Adriana Vera – Evita Santos
- Robinson Diaz – Carlos Santos
- Felipe Solano – Jose Rojas – Claudio Carvajales
- Maria Eugenia Davila – La Maga
- Iris Oyola – Adalgiza
- Jorge Romero – Alirio
- Cesar Mora – Jacinto Barba
- Sandra Perez – Lupe
- Jose Saldarriaga – Vicente Reinoso
- Ana Maria Hoyos – Kathy Albarracin
- Carmen Maria Torres – Tona
