= Yesenia (1987 TV series) =

- Genre: Telenovela; Romance; Drama
- Created by: Yolanda Vargas Dulché
- Written by: Luis Reyes de la Maza
- Directed by: Julio Castillo
- Starring: Adela Noriega; Luis Uribe; Ofelia Guilmain; Rafael Baledón; Norma Herrera; Marisa De Lille; Noe Murayama
- Opening theme: Instrumental by Gonzálo Gavira
- Country of origin: Mexico
- Original language: Spanish
- No. of episodes: 25

Production
- Executive producer: Irene Sabido
- Running time: 41-44 minutes
- Production company: Televisa

Original release
- Network: Canal de las Estrellas
- Release: January 10 – June 27, 1987

Related
- Yesenia (1970); Yesenia (1971)

Yesenia is a Mexican telenovela produced by Irene Sabido for Televisa in 1987. The protagonists of this telenovela were Adela Noriega and Luis Uribe, while Noe Murayama starred as antagonist.

== Plot ==
Yesenia is a beautiful Roma woman who lives different situations in an aimlessly fixed way with the company of her caravan. In one of her many trips she meets a military man, Osvaldo Moncada, and falls in love with him.

They will have to prove that their love is stronger than their differences and social prejudice that separate them. One of the opponents of their relationship is Rashay, the patriarch of the Roma people, who opposes the relationship because the military youth does not belong to the Romani tribe.

== Cast ==
- Adela Noriega as Yesenia
- Luis Uribe as Osvaldo Moncada
- Ofelia Guilmain as Magenta
- Rafael Baledón as Don Julio
- Norma Herrera as Marisela
- Marisa De Lille as Luisita
- Rosario Gálvez as Amparo
- Raúl Román as Bardo
- Mónica Miguel as Trifenia
- Tony Carbajal as Ramón
- Juan Carlos Bonet
- Noe Murayama as El Patriarca Rashay
- Héctor Tellez as Marko
- Patricia Bernal as Orlanda
- José Ángel García as Ernesto
- Martha Zamora as Doña Casilda
- Luis as Fabián
- Rosario Zúñiga
- Martha Papadimitrioli
