= María Isabel (1997 TV series) =

Mexican telenovela

- Also known as: Si tú supieras... María Isabel
- Genre: Telenovela; Romance; Drama
- Created by: Yolanda Vargas Dulché
- Written by: René Muñoz; Ricardo Fiallega
- Directed by: Miguel Córcega; Mónica Miguel
- Starring: Adela Noriega; Fernando Carrillo; Lorena Herrera; Rafael Rojas
- Theme music composer: Kike Santander
- Opening theme: "Si tú supieras" by Alejandro Fernández
- Country of origin: Mexico
- Original language: Spanish
- No. of episodes: 125

Production
- Executive producer: Carla Estrada
- Producer: Arturo Lorca
- Production locations: Mexico City; Tepic; Acaponeta; Guadalajara; Paris; Madrid
- Cinematography: Alejandro Frutos; Jesús Acuña Lee
- Running time: 21–22 minutes
- Production company: Televisa

Original release
- Network: Canal de las Estrellas
- Release: August 4, 1997 – February 6, 1998

Related
- María Isabel (1966); María Isabel (1967)

María Isabel (Spanish pronunciation: [maˈɾi.ajsaˈβel]) is a Mexican telenovela produced by Carla Estrada for Televisa. It aired on Canal de las Estrellas from August 4, 1997 to February 6, 1998. María Isabel, is one of the few telenovelas that focuses on the life of an indigenous female protagonist and her community. The story was written by Yolanda Vargas Dulché and adapted by René Muñoz.

The series stars Adela Noriega, Fernando Carrillo, Lorena Herrera and Rafael Rojas.

== Plot ==
María Isabel is a young woman of indigenous descent, who takes responsibility for raising Rosa Isela, the orphaned daughter of her deceased friend. She finds work in the household of Ricardo Mendiola, a wealthy widower who lives with his young daughter, Gloria. María Isabel falls in love with Ricardo but conceals her feelings for several years.

Influenced by Gloria, Rosa Isela becomes ashamed of María Isabel's indigenous background and eventually leaves her to live with her wealthy grandfather. Ricardo later realises that he has fallen in love with María Isabel and asks her to marry him. After their marriage, the couple face a series of difficulties that threaten their relationship and family life.

== Cast ==
- Adela Noriega as María Isabel Sanchez
- Fernando Carrillo as Ricardo Mendiola Zúñiga
- Lorena Herrera as Lucrecia Fontaner Hernández
- Rafael Rojas as Rigoberto
- Jorge Vargas as Don Félix Pereyra
- Patricia Reyes Spíndola as Manuela Rojas López
- Lilia Aragón as Rosaura Méndez Larrea
- Mónica Miguel as Chona
- José Carlos Ruiz as Pedro
- Alejandro Aragón as Leobardo Rangel
- Raúl Araiza as Andrés
- Emoé de la Parra as Déborah Serrano
- Juan Felipe Preciado as Rómulo Altamirano
- Rodrigo Vidal as Gilberto
- Roberto Ballesteros as Armando Noguera
- Jorge Salinas as Rubén
- Polo Ortín as Ministerio Vilchis
- Guillermo Aguilar as Dr. Rivas
- Isabel Martínez "La Tarabilla" as Chole
- Javier Herranz as José Luis
- Angelina Peláez as Micaela
- Ilse as Graciela Pereyra
- Charlie as Nicolás
- Susana González as Elisa de Mendiola
- Valentino Lanús as Antonio Altamirano
- Sabine Moussier as Mireya Serrano
- Omar Alexander as Anselmo
- Ángeles Balvanera as Panchita
- Eduardo Benfato as Filiberto
- Paty Bolaños as Abundia de Altamirano
- Marcelo Buquet as Cristóbal
- Julio Monterde as Dr. Carmona
- Fátima Torre as María Isabel (child)
- Naydelin Navarrete as Graciela Pereyra (child)/Rosa Isela (10 years old)
- Ximena Sariñana as Rosa Isela (13 years old)
- Paola Otero as Gloria Mendiola
- Violeta Isfel as Gloria Mendiola (10 years old)
- Andrea Lagunes as Gloria Mediola (6 years old)
- Natalia Juárez as Rosa Isela (baby)
- Ana Luisa Peluffo as Iris
- Enrique Rojo as Andrés
- Bertha Moss as Eugenia
- Yadhira Carrillo as Josefina
- Sergio Basañez as Gabriel
- Abraham Ramos as Ramón
- Aurora Clavel as Amargura
- Guillermo Rivas as Father Salvador
- Patricia Martínez as Matilde
- Tania Vázquez as Sonia
- Carlos López Estrada as Pedrito
- Magda Guzmán as Director
- Andrea Torre as Gloria's friend
- Ernesto Laguardia as Luis Torres

== Awards and nominations ==
Year	Award	Category	Nominee(s)	Result
1998	16th TVyNovelas Awards	Best Leading Actress	Patricia Reyes Spíndola	Nominated
1998	16th TVyNovelas Awards	Best Supporting Actor	José Carlos Ruiz	Won
1998	16th TVyNovelas Awards	Best Young Lead Actress	Adela Noriega	Won
1998	16th TVyNovelas Awards	Best Young Lead Actor	Fernando Carrillo	Nominated
1998	Latin ACE Awards	Female Figure of the Year	Adela Noriega	Nominated
1998	Latin ACE Awards	Male Figure of the Year	Fernando Carrillo	Nominated
1998	Eres Awards	Best Telenovela	Carla Estrada	Won
1998	Eres Awards	Best Young Lead Actress	Adela Noriega	Nominated
1998	Eres Awards	Best Young Lead Actor	Fernando Carrillo	Won
1998	Eres Awards	Best Musical Theme	"Si tú supieras" by Alejandro Fernández	Won
