= La búsqueda (TV series) =

Mexican television series

- Genre: Telenovela
- Created by: Carlos Lozano Dana
- Directed by: Enrique Rambal
- Country of origin: Mexico
- Original language: Spanish

Production
- Executive producer: Ernesto Alonso
- Cinematography: Carlos Salinas

Original release
- Network: Telesistema Mexicano
- Release: 1966

Related
- La búsqueda (1982)

La búsqueda is a Mexican telenovela produced by Ernesto Alonso for Telesistema Mexicano in 1966.

== Cast ==
- Susana Freyre as Irene Lagos
- Rosario Gálvez
- Enrique Rambal
