= Lila Yolanda Andrade =

Mexican writer

Lila Yolanda Andrade (Mexico City, 1923 - November 3, 2015) was a Mexican teacher and writer.

She studied Spanish literature at the National Autonomous University of Mexico and was one of the founders of the General Society of Mexican Writers (SOGEM). She worked mainly as a script writer.

== Works ==
- 1982, El sabor de las aves
- 2011, La infamia contra la mujer a través de los siglos

=== Scripts ===
- 1967, Adriana
- 1969, Tú eres mi destino
- 1986, Herencia maldita
- 1989, Lo blanco y lo negro
- 1995, Bajo un mismo rostro
- 1996, Bendita mentira
- 1997, Mujer, casos de la vida real
