= Cancionera (TV series) =

Mexican telenovela

- Genre: Telenovela
- Created by: Tessie Picasso
- Directed by: Raúl Araiza
- Starring: Norma Herrera; Manuel Ojeda
- Country of origin: Mexico
- Original language: Spanish
- No. of episodes: 20

Production
- Executive producer: Guillermo Diazayas
- Running time: 30 minutes

Original release
- Network: Canal de las Estrellas
- Release: 1980

Cancionera (English title: Singer) is a Mexican telenovela produced by Guillermo Diazayas for Televisa in 1980.

== Cast ==
- Norma Herrera as Norma
- Manuel Ojeda as Hector Raúl
- July Furlong as Paloma
- Rosario Gálvez as Amparo
- Liza Willert as Matilde
- Raúl Meráz as Bruno
- Luis Uribe as Alberto
- Miguel Suárez as Grandfather
- Gloria Marin as Emilia
- Miguel Angel Sanroman as Alfonso
- Carlos Pouliot as Maestro
- Norma Flores as Estela
- Irlanda Mora as Tania
- Rolando de Castro as Enrique
- Gustavo del Castillo as Sergio
- Sergio Esquivel as Sergio
- Arturo Benavides as Vázquez
- Sergio Milina as Producer
- Juan José Illescas as Doctor
- Alejandra Peniche as Josefina
