= Raúl Araiza (director) =

Mexican film and television director (1935–2013)

- Born: Raúl Araiza Cadena; 1 September 1935; Minatitlán, Veracruz, Mexico
- Died: 8 January 2013 (aged 77); Veracruz, Veracruz, Mexico
- Occupations: Director, actor, producer
- Years active: 1973–2008
- Spouse: Norma Herrera (divorce)
- Children: Raúl Araiza; Armando Araiza

Raúl Araiza (1 September 1935 – 8 January 2013) was a Mexican director, actor and producer

== Filmography ==
Telenovelas, series
Year	Title	Role	Notes
1973	Nefertiti y Aquenatos		Director
1975	El milagro de vivir		Special appearance
1975	El milagro de vivir		Director
1980	Cancionera		Producer
1981	El derecho de nacer		Director
1982	Vanessa		Director (part 2)
1982-83	Bianca Vidal		Director (part 1)
1983	El maleficio		Director
1984	La traición		Director
1987	Senda de gloria	Padre Antonio Álvarez	Supporting role
1987	Senda de gloria		Director
1989	Las grandes aguas		Supporting role
1995-96	Retrato de familia	Diego Corona	Supporting role
1996	Azul	Javier Valverde	Supporting role
1999-00	Tres mujeres		Director
2000	Locura de amor		Special appearance
2001	El derecho de nacer	El Negro	Supporting role
2002-03	Así son ellas		Director
2002-03	Así son ellas		Producer
2005-06	Barrera de amor		Director
2008	El Pantera		Director

== Awards and nominations ==
Year	Award	Category	Telenovela	Result
1985	Premios TVyNovelas	Best Direction	La traición	Won
1988	Premios TVyNovelas	Best Direction	Senda de gloria	Won
