= Adela Noriega =

Mexican actress (born 1969)

- Born: Adela Amalia Noriega Méndez; 24 October 1969 (age 57); Mexico City, Mexico
- Occupations: Actress, entrepreneur
- Years active: 1984–2008

Adela Amalia Noriega Méndez (Spanish pronunciation: [aˈðela noɾˈjeɣa]; born October 24, 1969; Mexico City) is a retired Mexican actress. She rose to prominence after starring in teen-oriented coming-of-age telenovelas in the 1980s, including Quinceañera (1987–1988) and Dulce desafío (1988–1989).

Some of her notable works include María Bonita (1995–1996), María Isabel (1997–1998), El Privilegio de Amar (1998–1999), El Manantial (2001–2002), Amor real (2003) and Fuego en la sangre (2008). Noriega's success as a leading lady has led her to be known as one of the "Queens" of the genre.

== Early life ==
Adela Amalia Noriega Méndez was born on 24 October 1969, in Mexico City, Mexico. Her father died when she was in her early adolescence and her mother died in 1995, after a battle with cancer. She has two siblings; an older sister, Reyna, and a younger brother, Alejandro.

== Career ==
=== Career beginnings ===
Noriega was discovered as a child, at the age of twelve she was scouted in a shopping centre while she was walking with her mother. Shortly after, she began to work as a fashion model and started appearing in TV commercials and music videos.

After being spotted on a shooting of a commercial by Patty de Llano, wife of the producer Luis de Llano Macedo, she began working as a teen actress. She made her television debut at the age of fourteen in the telenovela Principessa and shortly after she participated in Juana Iris. In both shows she interpreted antagonists. She also guest starred on the comic show Cachún cachún ra ra! for a few years.

=== Stardom ===
Noriega made her debut as a leading actress in 1986, at the age of sixteen, when she was cast for her first lead role in Yesenia, a historical telenovela. The telenovela was adapted from Yolanda Vargas Dulché's comic book of the same name, which centers around a young Romani woman and her caravan. From then on she began to work solely as a leading actress of many successful telenovelas with an international distribution.

She rose to greater prominence in 1987 when she obtained the leading role in Quinceañera, telenovela portraying coming-of-age topics. Quinceañera was the first telenovela that geared towards adolescents and revealed the problems they face in this transitional period from childhood to adulthood. Topics such as substance abuse, date rape, teenage pregnancy, juvenile delinquency, gangs and self-acceptance were being explored for the first time in this genre. This teen classic had a great impact in Mexico and other countries worldwide. In 2008, it was included on the Associated Press' "10 Most Influential Telenovelas of Latin America" list, "because it represented a precedent in this genre and has had an influence on the collective imaginary."

One year after, she returned to television in another successful teen-oriented telenovela; Dulce desafío, directed by Arturo Ripstein. In this teen drama, she played the central character, Lucero Sandoval, a teenage girl who rebels against her emotionally distant father and gets romantically involved with her teacher (Eduardo Yáñez).

=== Continued success ===
Noriega obtained a contract with the rival network Telemundo in 1992 and played the leading role in Guadalupe. For signing a contract with a different company, she was banned from her previous network, Televisa. Guadalupe resulted to be an international success and was well received in the Arab world to such an extent that she was invited to be the guest of honour of the King of Morocco in 1994.

In 1995, she moved to Colombia and joined RTI, starring in María Bonita, where she interpreted the title character, a singer who stays trapped on a Caribbean island.

She returned to Televisa in 1997 and collaborated with the producer Carla Estrada in four consecutive productions. The same year, she appeared as the lead character of María Isabel, interpreting a young indigenous woman faced with discrimination and lack of opportunities because of her origin. The telenovela presented the iconography of the tribe Huichol, based on indigenous folk beliefs and traditional symbols, and dealt with racial, cultural and class themes. For her characterization of the lead female character, Noriega received TVyNovelas Award for "Best Young Actress in a Leading Role".

A year later, she starred in El privilegio de amar, adaptation of Cristal, opposite Helena Rojo in a story that revolved around the world of fashion industry and show business. El privilegio de amar is officially the highest-rated television program in Mexico to date, according to IBOPE. The show was internationally successful as well.

In 2001, she starred in El Manantial, under the direction of Mónica Miguel and Adriana Barraza, co-starring Mauricio Islas. For her performance as the lead female character Alfonsina Valdes Rivero, she received another TVyNovelas Award, among others.

She returned to television in 2003, in the highly acclaimed historical telenovela, Amor real, in a story that was set in the Mexican post-independence period of the mid-19th century. This costume drama registered very high records of audience in Mexico and at the time of its airing on Univision, it occasionally managed to beat leading U.S. networks in the ratings. In 2005, Amor real was released on DVD and, due to its success, it became the first telenovela to be released with English subtitles. Noriega received various recognitions for her portrayal of the aristocrat, Matilde Peñalver y Beristáin.

In 2005, she portrayed the leading character of the telenovela La esposa virgen, opposite Jorge Salinas. The story was an adaptation of Caridad Bravo Adams' novel, Tormenta de pasiones. In 2008, she was the lead female character, Sofía Elizondo, in the telenovela Fuego en la sangre. The telenovela was a big success in Mexico and the U.S.

== Filmography ==
=== Films ===
| Year | Title | Role | Notes |
|---|---|---|---|
| 1986 | Las Amantes del Señor de la Noche | | Uncredited |
| 1988 | Un sábado más | Lucía | |

=== Television ===
| Year | Title | Role | Notes |
|---|---|---|---|
| 1984–1987 | Cachún cachún ra ra! | Adela | Nominated—TVyNovelas Award for Best Revelation in Comedy Series (1985) |
| 1984–1986 | Principessa | Alina | El Heraldo Award for Debutant of the Year |
| 1985 | Juana Iris | Romina | TVyNovelas Award for Best Female Debutant |
| 1987 | Yesenia | Yesenia | Nominated—TVyNovelas Award for Best Young Lead Actress |
| 1987–1988 | Quinceañera | Maricruz Fernández Sarcoser | TVyNovelas Award for Best Young Lead Actress; Palmas de Oro Award for Best Young Actress |
| 1988–1989 | Dulce desafío | Lucero Sandoval | TVyNovelas Award for Best Young Lead Actress |
| 1993–1994 | Guadalupe | Guadalupe Zambrano Santos | Telemundo |
| 1995–1996 | María Bonita | María "María Bonita" Reynoso | RTI Colombia; Nominated—TVyNovelas Awards Colombia for Best Lead Actress |
| 1997–1998 | María Isabel | María Isabel Sánchez | TVyNovelas Award for Best Young Lead Actress; Nominated—Eres Award for Best Young Actress |
| 1998–1999 | El Privilegio de Amar | Cristina Miranda | New York Latin ACE Award for Best Television Actress; TVyNovelas Award for Best Young Lead Actress; Califa de Oro Award for Best Young Actress; Nominated—Eres Award for Best Young Actress |
| 2001–2002 | El Manantial | Alfonsina Valdés Rivero | New York Latin ACE Award for Best Television Actress; TVyNovelas Award for Best Lead Actress; Palmas de Oro Award for Best Lead Actress; Bravo Award for Best TV Actress; Sol de Oro Award (Mexico's National Association of Journalists) for Best Actress; Nominated—Award Inte for Best Television Actress |
| 2003 | Amor real | Matilde Peñalver y Beristáin de Fuentes Guerra | New York Latin ACE Award for Best Television Actress; TVyNovelas Award for Best Lead Actress; Laurel de Oro Award for Best Actress; Califa de Oro Award for Best Actress; Nominated—Award Inte for Best Television Actress; Sol de Oro Award (Mexico's National Association of Journalists) for Best Actress |
| 2005 | La esposa virgen | Virginia Alfaro | Nominated—TVyNovelas Award for Best Lead Actress |
| 2008 | Fuego en la sangre | Sofía Elizondo Acevedo | Nominated—TVyNovelas Award for Best Lead Actress; Nominated—Award Fama for Best Lead Actress |

=== Music videos ===
| Year | Title | Role | Notes |
|---|---|---|---|
| 1984 | "Corazón de Fresa" | Love interest | Lucía Méndez video |
| 1984 | "Palabra de Honor" | Love interest | Luis Miguel video |

== Awards and honours ==
Noriega has been honoured with multiple awards for her work in the television industry, and the wide acceptance of her work throughout the years has established her reputation as a "Telenovela Queen".
