= ¿Quién es la máscara? (Mexican TV series) =

Mexican reality TV series

- Genre: Reality
- Created by: Seo Chang-man
- Based on: King of Mask Singer by Munhwa Broadcasting Corporation
- Presented by: Omar Chaparro; Adrián Uribe
- Judges: Consuelo Duval; Carlos Rivera; Yuri; Adrián Uribe; Juanpa Zurita; Mónica Huarte; Galilea Montijo; Martha Higareda; Anahí; Ana Brenda Contreras; Mauricio Ochmann
- Narrated by: Paola Rojas
- Country of origin: Mexico
- Original language: Spanish
- No. of seasons: 8
- No. of episodes: 74 (list of episodes)

Production
- Executive producer: Miguel Ángel Fox
- Production companies: Televisa; Endemol Shine Boomdog

Original release
- Network: Las Estrellas
- Release: August 25, 2019 – present

Related
- King of Mask Singer

¿Quién es la máscara? (Spanish: Who Is the Mask?) is a Mexican talent reality television series produced by Televisa and Endemol Shine Boomdog. It is based on the South Korean television show King of Mask Singer created by Seo Chang-man. Televisa is the second network in the Americas to obtain the franchise of said program. It is hosted by Omar Chaparro and premiered on Las Estrellas on August 25, 2019.

The eighth season premiered on October 11, 2026.

== Format ==
A group of celebrities hide behind a character and, week after week, a panel of researchers will try to discover who is behind the mask. Competitors are matched in face-off competitions and perform a song. The studio audience votes for their favorite performance and the masked singer with the most votes is safe for the week, while the celebrity with the least votes is nominated for elimination. The panelists decide which of the nominated celebrities will not continue in the competition. The eliminated celebrity removes their mask to reveal their identity.

== Panelists and host ==
Panelists and host of season 7 of ¿Quién es la máscara?

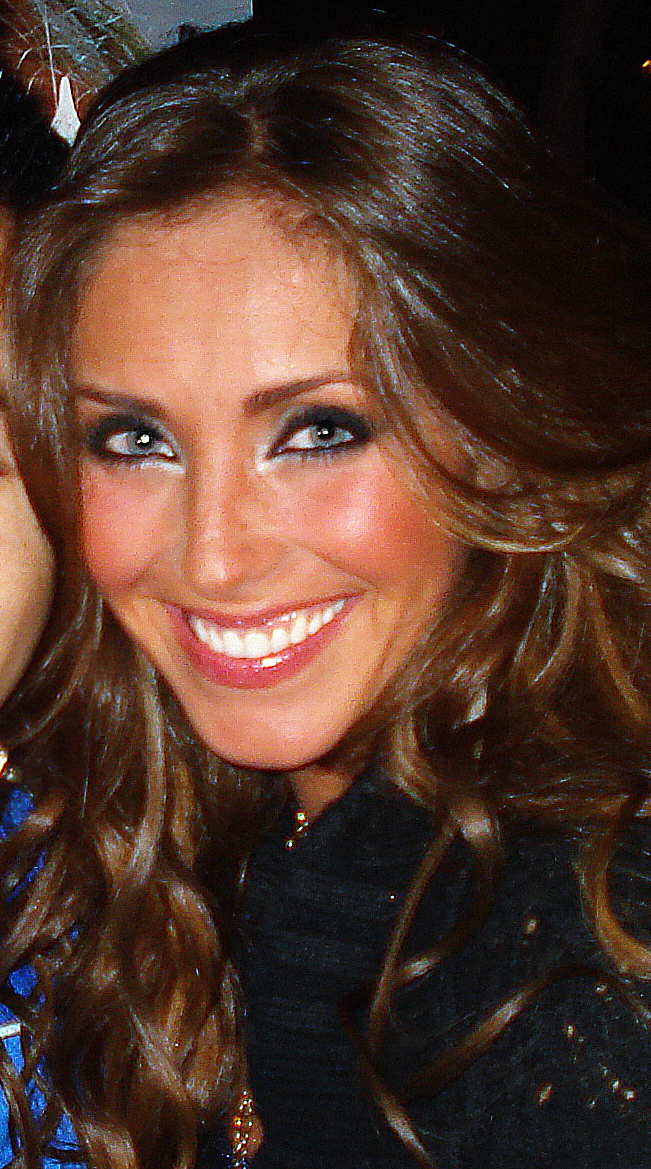
Anahí

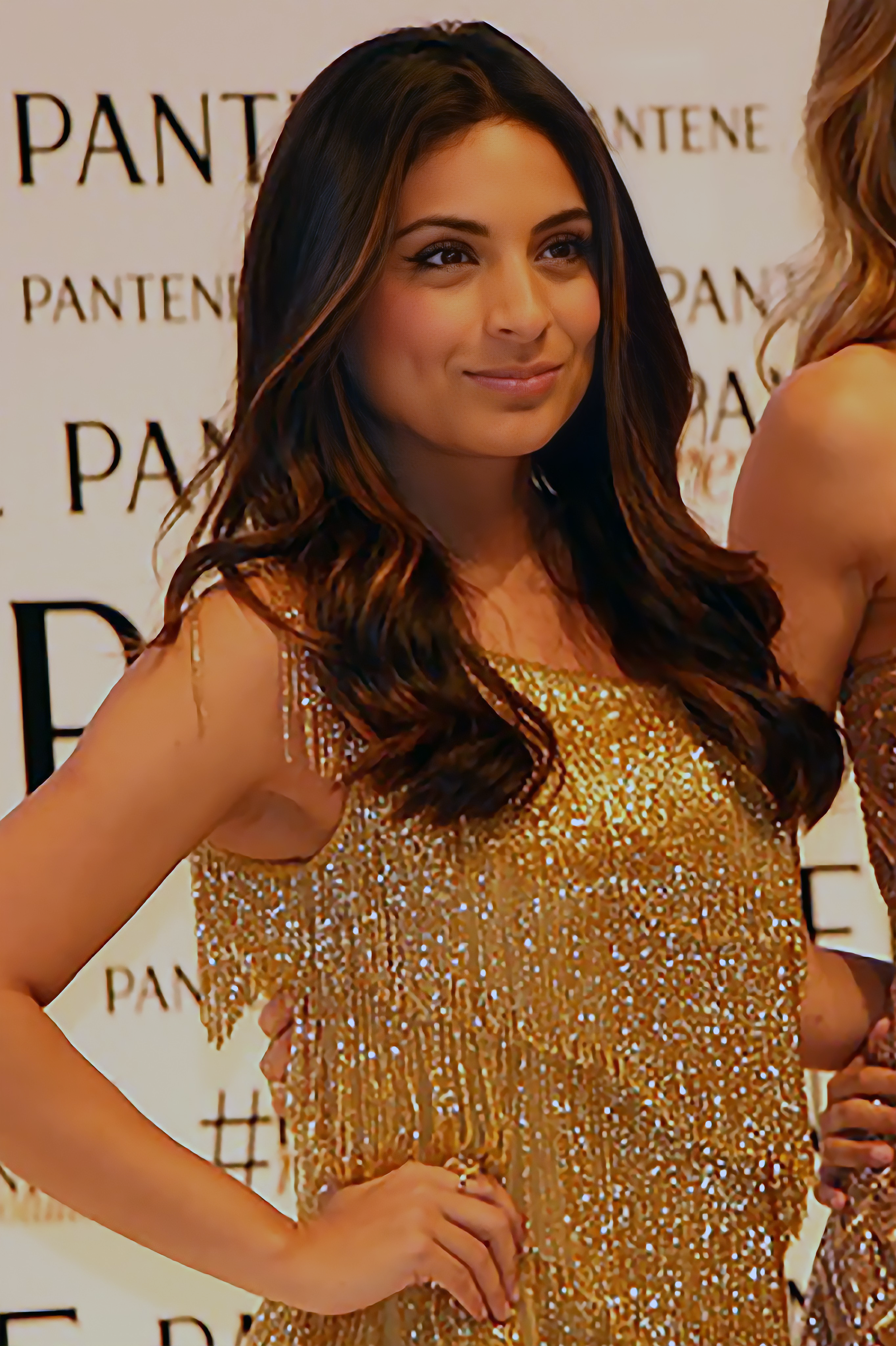
Ana Brenda Contreras

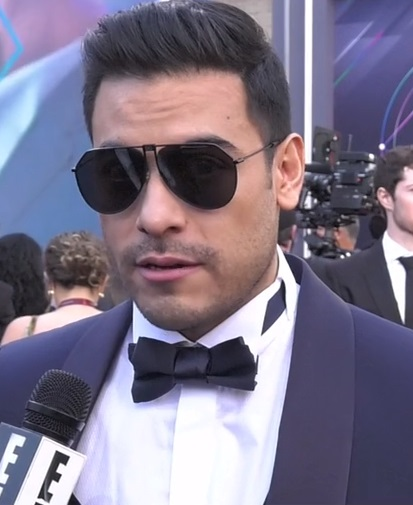
Carlos Rivera

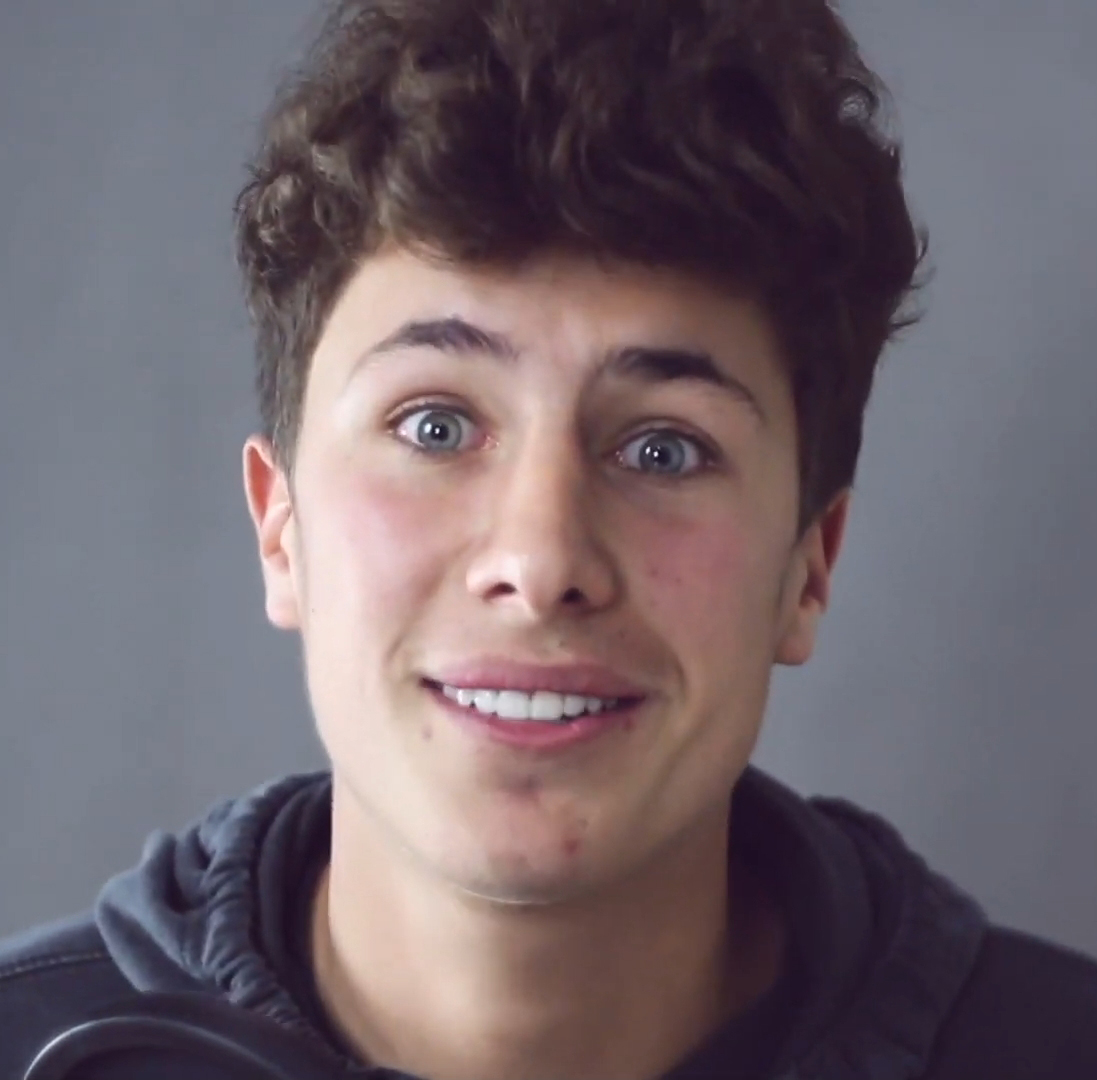
Juanpa Zurita

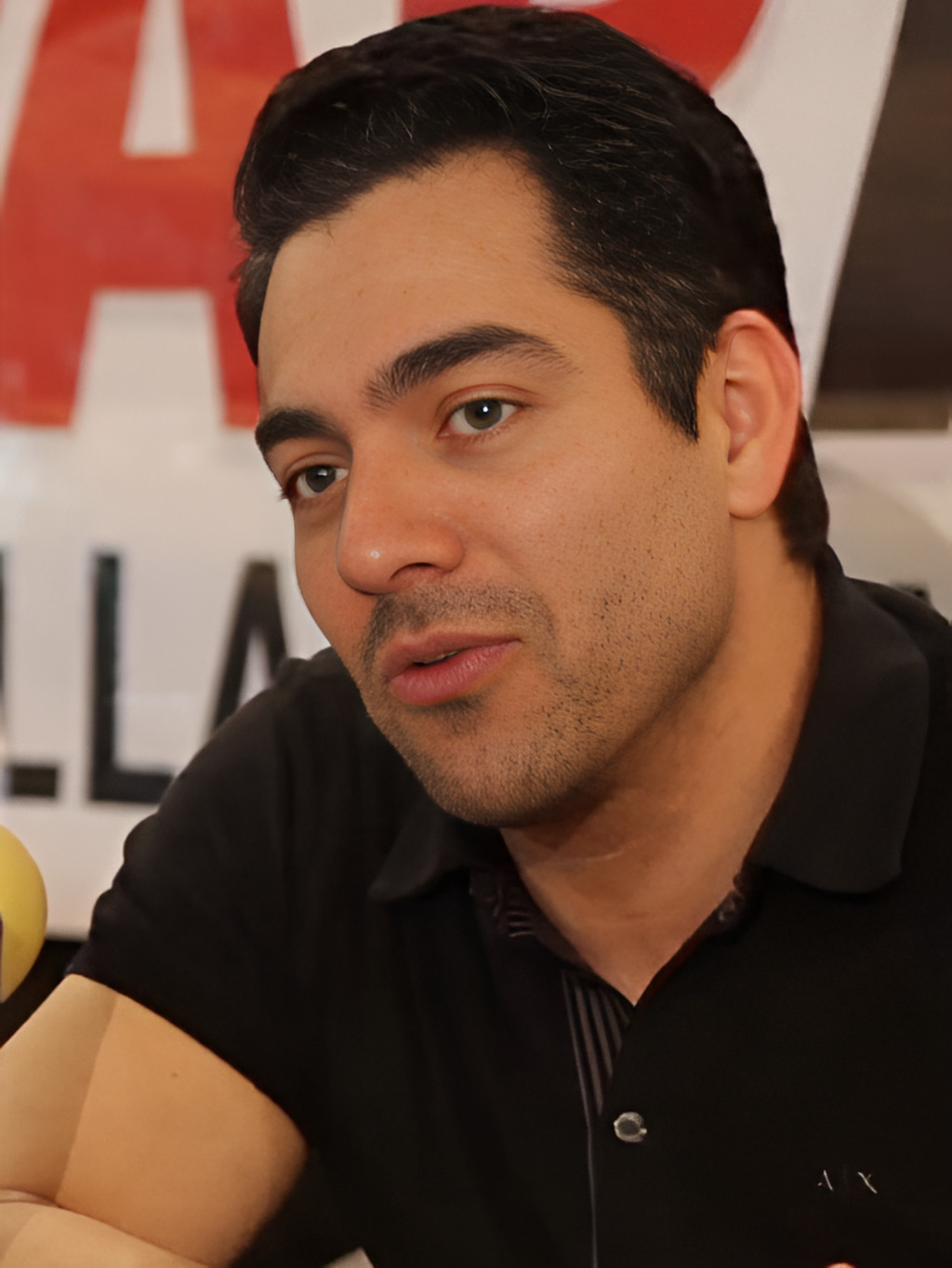
Omar Chaparro

The panelists of the first season consisted of actor and comedian Adrián Uribe, singer Yuri, actress and comedian Consuelo Duval, and singer Carlos Rivera. Adrián Uribe did not return for season two and was replaced by Juanpa Zurita. Consuelo Duval did not return for season three and was replaced by Mónica Huarte. Season 1 panelist Adrián Uribe replaced Chaparro as host in season 3. Mónica Huarte did not return for season four and was replaced by Galilea Montijo, while Omar Chaparro returned to the show as host replacing Adrián Uribe. Montijo did not return for season five and was replaced by Martha Higareda. In the sixth season, Yuri was replaced by singer and actress Anahí. In the seventh season, Martha Higareda was replaced by actress and season six contestant Ana Brenda Contreras. In the eighth season, Carlos Rivera was replaced by Mauricio Ochmann. Additionally, Yuri returned as panelist, replacing Ana Brenda Contreras.

Cast Member	Seasons							
Cast Member	1	2	3	4	5	6	7	8
Host
Omar Chaparro	Main	Main		Main	Main	Main	Main	Main
Adrián Uribe			Main	Mask				
Panelists
Consuelo Duval	Main	Main						
Carlos Rivera	Main	Main	Main	Main	Main	Main	Main	
Yuri	Main	Main	Main	Main	Main			Main
Adrián Uribe	Main			Mask				
Juanpa Zurita		Main	Main	Main	Main	Main	Main	Main
Mónica Huarte			Main					
Galilea Montijo		Guest		Main		Mask		
Martha Higareda					Main	Main		
Anahí						Main	Main	Main
Ana Brenda Contreras						Mask	Main	

== Series overview ==
Series overview
Season	Celebrities	Episodes	Originally released		Winner	Runner-up	Third place
Season	Celebrities	Episodes	First released	Last released	Winner	Runner-up	Third place
1	16	8	August 25, 2019	October 13, 2019	Vadhir Derbez as "Camaleón"	Patricia Manterola as "Lechuza"	Mario Bautista as "Cebra"
2	18	10	October 11, 2020	December 13, 2020	María León as "Disco Ball"	Paty Cantú as "Mapache"	Edén Muñoz as "Oso Polar"
3	18	10	October 10, 2021	December 19, 2021	Kalimba as "Apache"	Gala Montes as "Gitana"	Emilio Osorio as "La Hueva"
4	18	10	October 16, 2022	December 18, 2022	JNS (Note: Karla Díaz-Leal, Melissa López, Regina Murguía and Angie Taddei were the members of JNS that participated within the show.) as "Huacal"	Ana Bárbara as "Alebrije"	Ricardo Margaleff as "Bunch"
5	19	10	October 15, 2023	December 17, 2023	Bárbara de Regil as "Puercoespunk"	Carlos Baute as "José Ramonstruo"	Werevertumorro as "Jaguar"
6	20	10	October 20, 2024	December 22, 2024	Armando Hernández as "Freddie Verdury"	Galilea Montijo as "Cacahuate Enchilado"	Daniela Luján as "Huesito Peligroso"
7	18	10	October 12, 2025	December 14, 2025	Paulina Goto as "Tropi Coco"	Gabriel Soto as "Carro Ñero"	Marie Claire Harp as "Metaliebre"
8	18	10	October 11, 2026	TBA	TBA	TBA	TBA

== Reception ==
=== Ratings ===
Viewership and ratings per season of ¿Quién es la máscara?
Season	Episodes	First aired		Last aired		Avg. viewers (millions)
Season	Episodes	Date	Viewers (millions)	Date	Viewers (millions)	Avg. viewers (millions)
1	8	August 25, 2019	4.0	October 13, 2019	5.3	4.10
2	10	October 11, 2020	3.8	December 13, 2020	3.9	3.85
3	9	October 10, 2021	3.9	December 19, 2021	N/A	3.59
4	9	October 16, 2022	3.1	December 18, 2022	N/A	2.99
5	10	October 15, 2023	2.9	December 17, 2023	2.2	2.71
6	7	October 20, 2024	2.9	December 22, 2024	N/A	2.58
7	10	October 12, 2025	4.7	December 14, 2025	3.6	4.04
8	6	October 11, 2026	3.5	TBA	TBD	3.36

=== Awards and nominations ===
Year	Award	Category	Nominated	Result	Ref
2020	TVyNovelas Awards	Best Reality	Miguel Ángel Fox	Won	
2020	Produ Awards	Best Non-Scripted Foreign Format	¿Quién es la máscara?	Won	
2020	Produ Awards	Best Male TV Host	Omar Chaparro	Won	
2021	International Emmy Awards	Best Non-Scripted Entertainment	Miguel Ángel Fox	Nominated	
2021	Produ Awards	Best Adapted Foreign Talent Reality Show	¿Quién es la máscara?	Won	
2021	Produ Awards	Best Entertainment Producer	Miguel Ángel Fox	Nominated	
2022	Produ Awards	Best Adapted Foreign Talent Reality Show	¿Quién es la máscara?	Won	
2022	Produ Awards	Grand Award for Entertainment	¿Quién es la máscara?	Won	
2023	Produ Awards	Best Adapted Foreign Talent Reality Show	¿Quién es la máscara?	Nominated	
2025	Produ Awards	Best Adapted Skill and Knowledge Reality Show	¿Quién es la máscara?	Nominated	
2025	International Emmy Awards	Best Non-Scripted Entertainment	¿Quién es la máscara?	Nominated	

== Specials ==
=== ¿Quién es la máscara? Teletón 2019 ===
On December 14, 2019, as part of Teletón 2019, a special program was held where Diego Boneta, Patricia Manterola, Eugenio Derbez and Cristián de la Fuente formed the judging panel. The show was hosted by Galilea Montijo. The program consisted of only three face-offs between four contestants wearing first season costumes.

Stage name	Celebrity	Notability	Face-off		
Stage name	Celebrity	Notability	A	B	C
Pez	Ninel Conde	Actress & Singer	WIN		WINNER
Gato	Karol Sevilla	Actress & Singer		WIN	RUNNER-UP
Gallo	Juan Pablo Gil	Actor		OUT	
Conejo	Gaby Spanic	Actress & Singer	OUT		

The masked singer won their face-off and remained in the competition.
The masked singer was eliminated from the competition.
The masked singer did not perform.

Performances on the special program
#	Stage name	Song	Identity	Result
1	Pez	"Sin Pijama" by Becky G and Natti Natasha	undisclosed	WIN
2	Conejo	"¡Basta Ya!" by Jenni Rivera	Gaby Spanic	OUT
3	Gato	"Regresame Mi Corazón" by Carlos Rivera	undisclosed	WIN
4	Gallo	"Provócame" by Chayanne	Juan Pablo Gil	OUT
5	Gato	"La Mordidita" by Ricky Martin ft. Yotuel	Karol Sevilla	RUNNER-UP
6	Pez	"No Me Acuerdo" by Thalía	Ninel Conde	WINNER

=== ¿Quién es la máscara? Teletón 2020 ===
On December 5, 2020, as part of Teletón 2020, a special program was held where Mario Bautista, Consuelo Duval, Juanpa Zurita, and Carlos Rivera formed the judging panel. The show was hosted by Yuri. The program consisted of only two face-offs between three contestants wearing season two costumes.

Stage name	Celebrity	Notability	Face-off	
Stage name	Celebrity	Notability	A	B
Monstruo	Luis Angel "El Flaco"	Singer	SAFE	WINNER
Banana	Mauricio Garza	Actor	SAFE	RUNNER-UP
Lele	Karla Díaz	Singer	OUT	

The masked singer was safe from elimination.
The masked singer was eliminated from the competition.

Performances on the special program
#	Stage name	Song	Identity	Result
1	Banana	"Ya Lo Veía Venir" by Moderatto	undisclosed	SAFE
2	Lele	"Como la Flor" by Selena	Karla Díaz	OUT
3	Monstruo	"Vivir Mi Vida" by Marc Anthony	undisclosed	SAFE
Máscara vs. Máscara			Identity	Result
1	Banana	"Y La Fiesta Comenzó" by Timbiriche	Mauricio Garza	RUNNER-UP
1	Monstruo	"Y La Fiesta Comenzó" by Timbiriche	Luis Angel "El Flaco"	WINNER

=== ¿Quién es la máscara? Teletón 2021 ===
On December 4, 2021, as part of Teletón 2021, a special program was held where Mónica Huarte, Juanpa Zurita, and Carlos Rivera formed the judging panel. The show was hosted by Adrián Uribe. The program consisted of only two face-offs between three contestants wearing season three costumes.

Stage name	Celebrity	Notability	Face-off	
Stage name	Celebrity	Notability	A	B
Sirena	Daniela Magun	Singer/TV Host	SAFE	WINNER
Perro	Pancho Barraza	Singer	SAFE	RUNNER-UP
Caracol	Andrea Escalona	Actress/TV Host	OUT	

The masked singer was safe from elimination.
The masked singer was eliminated from the competition.

Performances on the special program
#	Stage name	Song	Identity	Result
1	Caracol	"Piénsalo" by Banda MS	Andrea Escalona	OUT
2	Perro	"Canción Bonita" by Carlos Vives and Ricky Martin	undisclosed	SAFE
3	Sirena	"Good 4 U" by Olivia Rodrigo	undisclosed	SAFE
Máscara vs. Máscara			Identity	Result
1	Sirena	"Chantaje" by Shakira feat. Maluma	Daniela Magun	WINNER
1	Perro	"Chantaje" by Shakira feat. Maluma	Pancho Barraza	RUNNER-UP

=== ¿Quién es la máscara? Teletón 2022 ===
A fourth Teletón special program was held on December 17, 2022. Galilea Montijo, Carlos Rivera, and Juanpa Zurita formed the judging panel. The show was hosted by Omar Chaparro. The program consisted of only two face-offs between three contestants wearing season four costumes.

Stage name	Celebrity	Notability	Face-off	
Stage name	Celebrity	Notability	A	B
Cornelio	Mariazel Olle Casals	TV Host	SAFE	WINNER
Dálmata	Michelle Renaud	Actress	SAFE	RUNNER-UP
Pulpo	Marlene Favela	Actress	OUT	

The masked singer was safe from elimination.
The masked singer was eliminated from the competition.

Performances on the special program
#	Stage name	Song	Identity	Result
1	Dálmata	"Girls Just Want to Have Fun" by Cyndi Lauper	undisclosed	SAFE
2	Cornelio	"Si Una Vez" by Selena	undisclosed	SAFE
3	Pulpo	"La Fuerza del Destino" by Mecano	Marlene Favela	OUT
Máscara vs. Máscara			Identity	Result
1	Cornelio	"Duele el Amor" by Aleks Syntek ft. Ana Torroja	Mariazel Olle Casals	WINNER
1	Dálmata	"Duele el Amor" by Aleks Syntek ft. Ana Torroja	Michelle Renaud	RUNNER-UP

=== ¿Quién es la máscara? Teletón 2023 ===
A fifth Teletón special program was held on December 16, 2023. Yuri, Carlos Rivera, Juanpa Zurita, and Martha Higareda formed the judging panel. The show was hosted by Omar Chaparro. The program consisted of only one face-off between three contestants wearing season five costumes.

Stage name	Celebrity	Notability	Face-off
Avispa	Raquel Bigorra	TV personality	WINNER
Milagrito	Mariana Ochoa	Singer and actress	RUNNER-UP
Girasol	Paco de Miguel	Internet personality	THIRD

Performances on the special program
#	Stage name	Song	Identity	Result
1	Avispa	"Malas decisiones" by Kenia Os	Raquel Bigorra	WINNER
2	Girasol	"Kesi" by Camilo	Paco de Miguel	THIRD
3	Milagrito	"Makeba" by Jain	Mariana Ochoa	RUNNER-UP

=== ¿Quién es la máscara? Teletón 2024 ===
A sixth Teletón was held on December 14, 2024. Anahí, Carlos Rivera, Juanpa Zurita, and Martha Higareda formed the judging panel. The show was hosted by Omar Chaparro. The program consisted of two face-offs between three contestants wearing season six costumes.

Stage name	Celebrity	Notability	Face-off	
Stage name	Celebrity	Notability	A	B
Azul	Mario Bezares	TV personality	SAFE	WINNER
Erik El Roto	Imanol Landeta	Actor and singer	SAFE	RUNNER-UP
Maraña	Mariana Torres	Actress	OUT	

Performances on the special program
#	Stage name	Song	Identity	Result
1	Azul	"Amante Bandido" by Miguel Bosé	undisclosed	SAFE
2	Maraña	"La Mejor Versión de Mí" by Natti Natasha	Mariana Torres	OUT
3	Erik El Roto	"Calidad" by Grupo Firme & Luis Mexia	undisclosed	SAFE
Máscara vs. Máscara			Identity	Result
1	Azul	"Besos en Guerra" by Juanes & Morat	Mario Bezares	WINNER
1	Erik El Roto	"Besos en Guerra" by Juanes & Morat	Imanol Landeta	RUNNER-UP

=== ¿Quién es la máscara? Teletón 2025 ===
A seventh Teletón was held on October 11, 2025. Carlos Rivera, Cynthia Urías, Juanpa Zurita, and Michelle Rodriguez formed the judging panel. The show was hosted by Omar Chaparro. The program consisted of a single face-off between three contestants wearing costumes from the first three seasons.

Stage name	Celebrity	Notability	Face-off
Camaleón	Lambda García	Actor	WINNER
Disco Ball	Laura Carmine	Actress	RUNNER-UP
Gitana	Verónica Montes	Actress	OUT

Performances on the special program
#	Stage name	Song	Identity	Result
1	Gitana	"Si Antes Te Hubiera Conocido" by Karol G	Verónica Montes	OUT
2	Camaleón	"Ojos Marrones" by Lasso	Lambda García	WINNER
3	Disco Ball	"La Tortura" by Shakira ft. Alejandro Sanz	Laura Carmine	RUNNER-UP
