= Teletón =

Teletón, Spanish for telethon, may refer to:

- Teletón (Chile), an annual Chilean telethon
- Teletón (Mexico), an annual Mexican telethon
- Teletón USA; see Teletón (Mexico)#Teletón USA
- Teletón El Salvador
