= ¿Quién es la máscara? (Mexican TV series) season 8 =

¿Quién es la máscara?
- Season 8
- Hosted by: Omar Chaparro
- Judges: Anahí; Juanpa Zurita; Mauricio Ochmann; Yuri
- No. of contestants: 18
- No. of episodes: 6

Release
- Original network: Las Estrellas
- Original release: October 11, 2026 – present

Season chronology
- ← Previous; Season 7

The eighth season of the Mexican television series ¿Quién es la máscara? premiered on Las Estrellas on October 11, 2026.

== Production ==
The season is set to feature 18 new costumes and will introduce the "Wild Card" twist in which a contestant will enter the competition later in the season. The panelists each have one opportunity to use the "Sálvame" button (introduced in the sixth season) to save one contestant from elimination.

== Panelists and host ==
Season 8 panelists and host

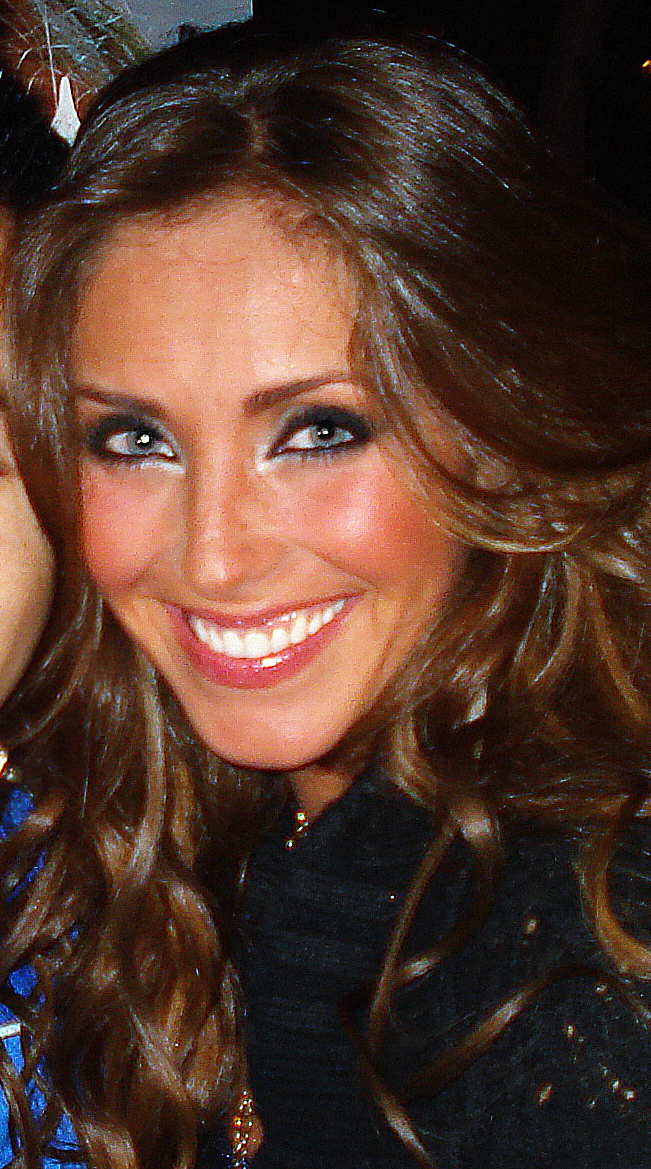
Anahí

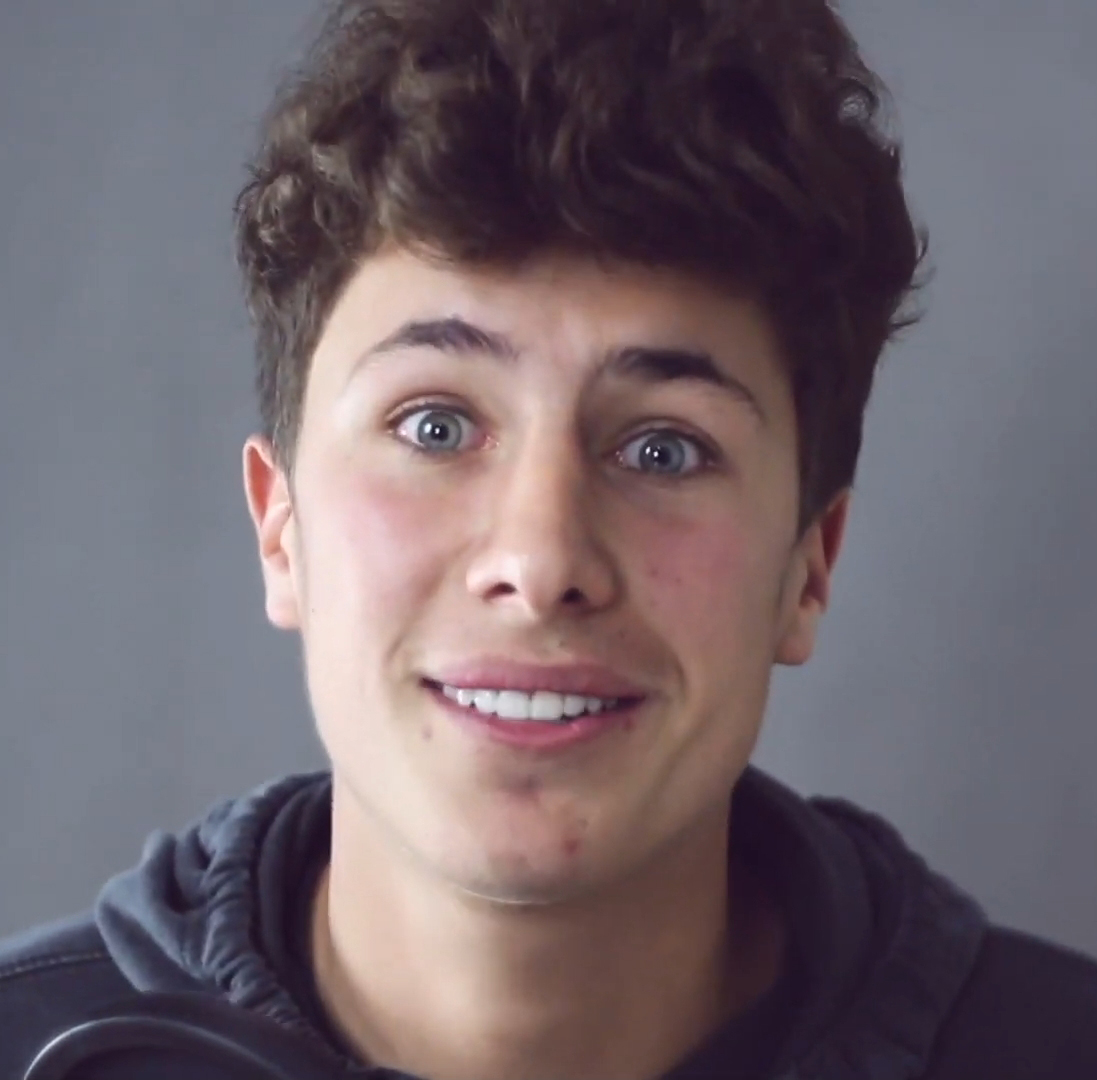
Juanpa Zurita

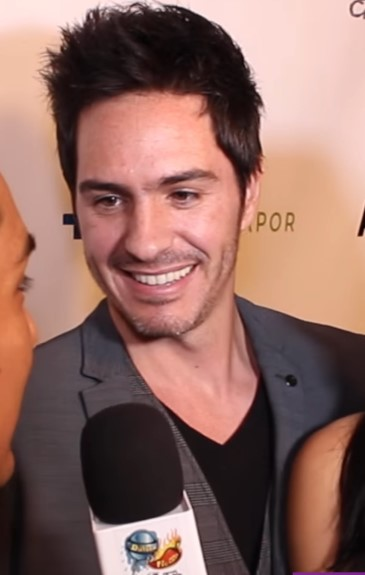
Mauricio Ochmann

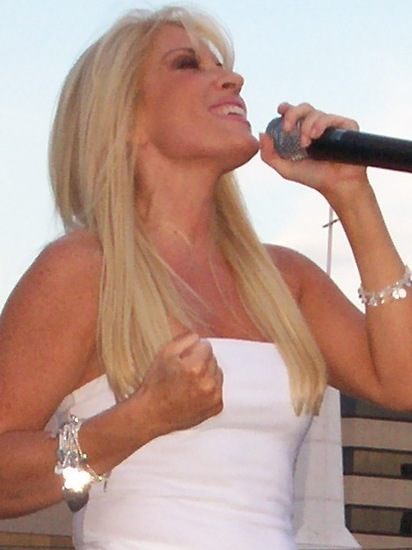
Yuri

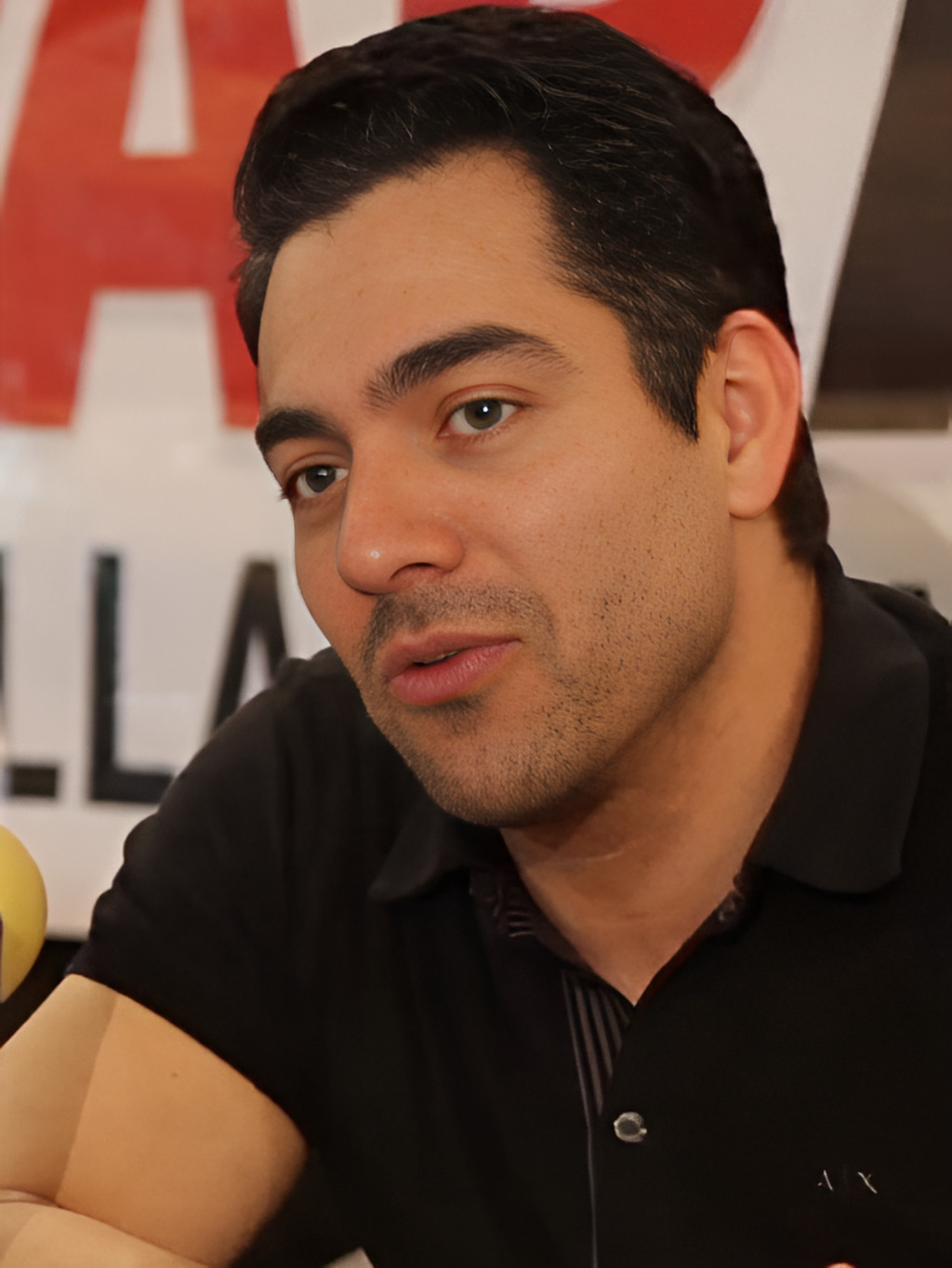
Omar Chaparro

Omar Chaparro returned as host, while social media influencer Juanpa Zurita and singer and actress Anahí returned as panelists. Yuri returns to the panel after being absent the previous two seasons, replacing Ana Brenda Contreras. Actor Mauricio Ochmann replaced longtime panelist Carlos Rivera.

== Contestants ==
Results
Stage name	Celebrity	Occupation(s)	Episodes						
Stage name	Celebrity	Occupation(s)	1	2	3	4	5	6	7
Alex Loro	TBA		WIN			WIN		RISK	TBA
Ana Conda	TBA				WIN		RISK	WIN	TBA
Dr. Kaboom	TBA			WIN		WIN		WIN	TBA
La Patrona	TBA			WIN			RISK	RISK	TBA
Licua Checo	TBA				RISK		WIN	WIN	TBA
Patito Feo	TBA		RISK			RISK		RISK	TBA
Roseta Palomares	TBA				WIN		WIN	RISK	TBA
Slash	Marcus Ornellas	Actor	KEPT (Note: While in the middle of their unmasking, panelist Juanpa Zurita used the "Sálvame" button to save Slash from elimination, allowing the portrayer to keep their mask on and continue in the competition.)				RISK	OUT	
Carmela Tarantela	Marisol del Olmo	Actress	WIN			RISK		OUT	
El Paisa	Jair Sánchez	Comedian/internet personality		RISK			OUT		
Fifi Ñera	Fabiola Guajardo	Actress	RISK				OUT		
Caco Mixtle	Pablo Ruiz	Singer			RISK	OUT			
Octavia Ventosa	Ela Velden	Actress		RISK		OUT			
Atrapasueños	Alejandra Barros	Actress			OUT				
Tiburcio	Vanessa Huppenkothen	TV host			OUT				
Rito Cangurito	Verónica Montes	Actress		OUT					
Beto Batazo	Latin Lover	Professional wrestler and actor		OUT					
Gárgola	René Casados	Actor	OUT						

The masked singer won their face-off and remained in the competition.
The masked singer lost their face-off, but was not eliminated.
The masked singer was safe from elimination.
The masked singer was eliminated from the competition.
The masked singer did not perform.
The masked singer is scheduled to perform.
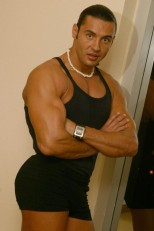
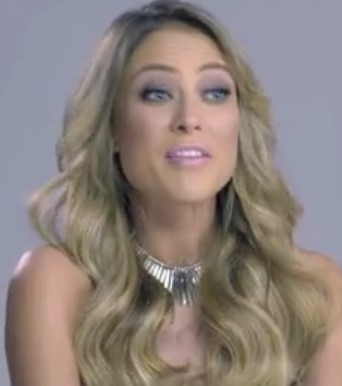
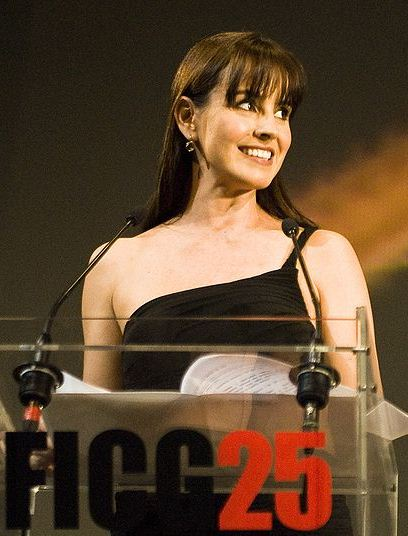
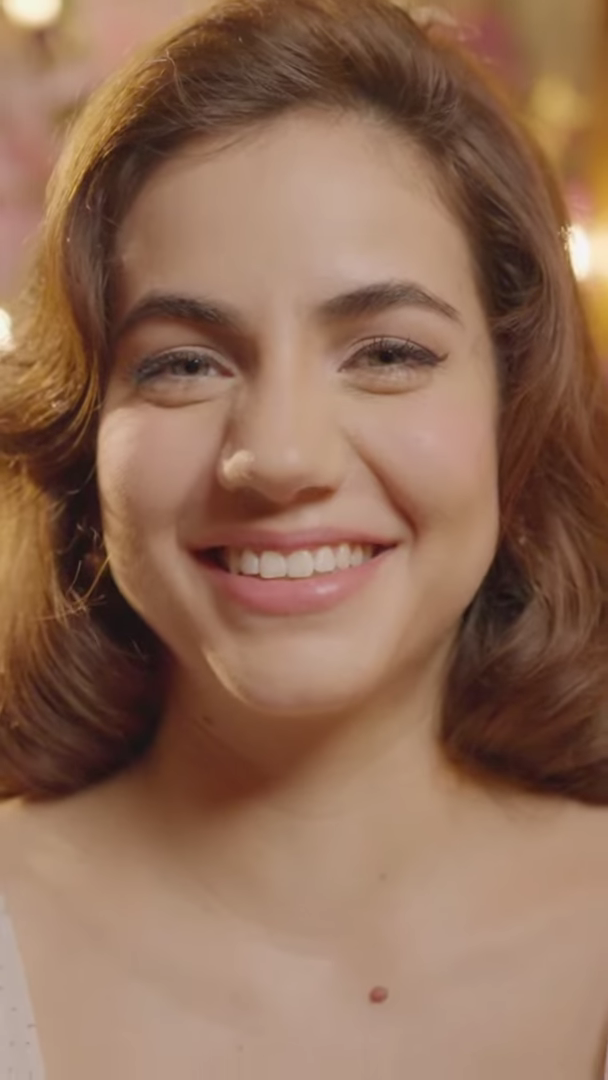
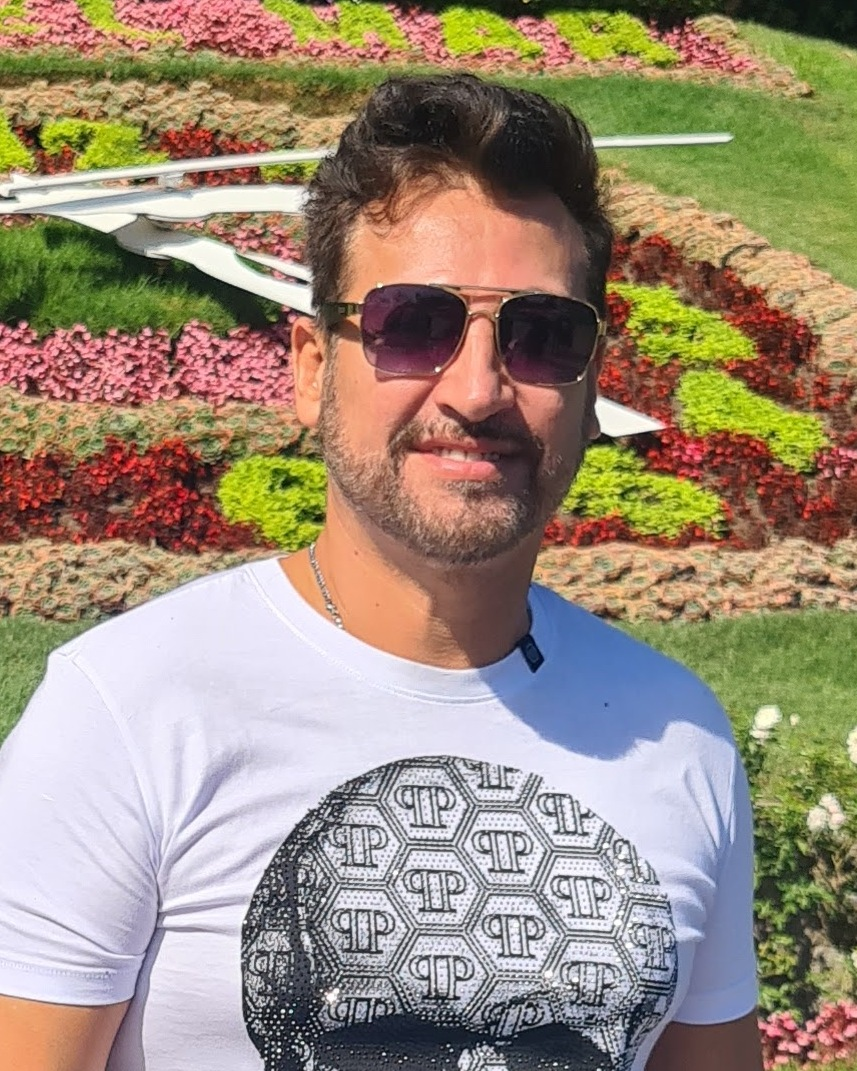
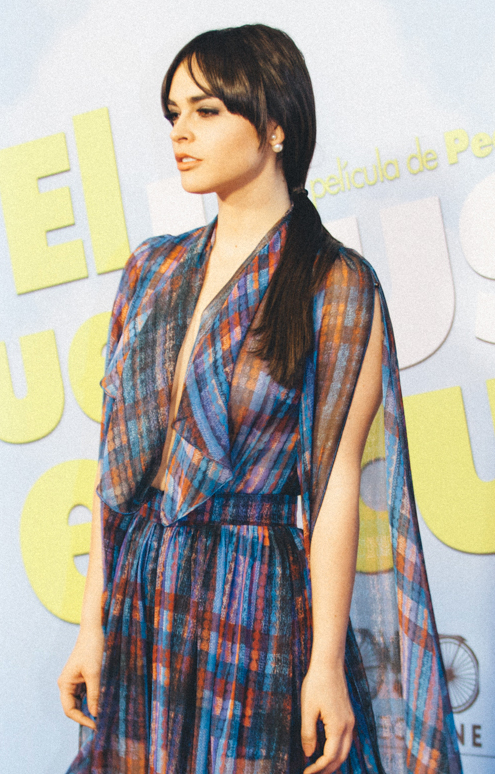
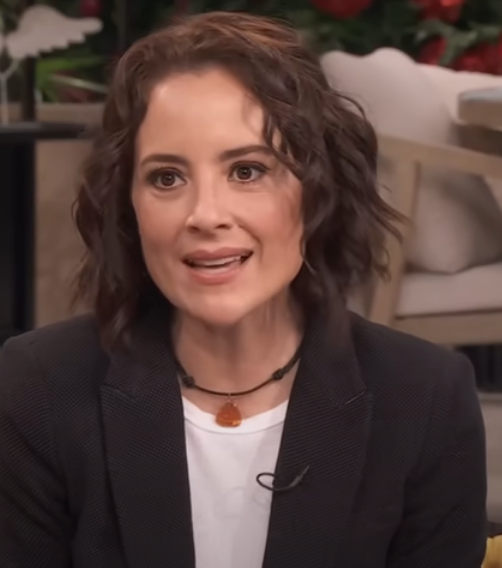
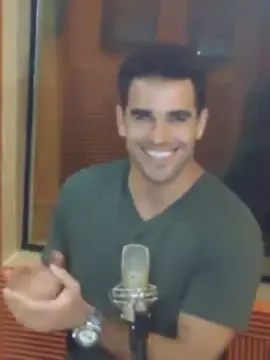
The celebrities who competed in the eighth season of ¿Quién es la máscara?, pictured in order of elimination (L-R):
Latin Lover ("Beto Batazo"), Verónica Montes ("Rito Cangurito"), Vanessa Huppenkothen ("Tiburcio"), Alejandra Barros ("Atrapasueños"), Ela Velden ("Octavia Ventosa"), Pablo Ruiz ("Caco Mixtle"), Fabiola Guajardo ("Fifi Ñera"), Marisol del Olmo ("Carmela Tarantela"), and Marcus Ornellas ("Slash")
Not pictured: Rene Casados ("Gárgola") and Jair Sánchez ("El Paisa")

== Episodes ==
=== Week 1 (October 11) ===
Performances on the first episode
#	Stage name	Song	Result	
1	Carmela Tarantela	"Mi Buen Amor" by Mon Laferte	undisclosed	WIN
2	Slash	"Oye Mi Amor" by Maná	undisclosed	KEPT
3	Patito Feo	"Dr. Psiquiatra" by Gloria Trevi	undisclosed	RISK
4	Alex Loro	"Triste Canción" by El Tri	undisclosed	WIN
5	Fifi Ñera	"Superestrella" by Aitana	undisclosed	RISK
6	Gárgola	"Que Vuelvas" by Carín León & Grupo Frontera	René Casados	OUT

=== Week 2 (October 18) ===
Performances on the second episode
#	Stage name	Song	Result	
1	Beto Batazo	"Este" by El Alfa & Nfasis	Latin Lover	OUT
2	Dr. Kaboom	"Mi Mayor Anhelo" by Banda MS	undisclosed	WIN
3	Octavia Ventosa	"Cada Que..." by Belanova	undisclosed	RISK
4	El Paisa	"Derecho De Antigüedad" by La Original Banda El Limón	undisclosed	RISK
5	La Patrona	"Loba" by Shakira	undisclosed	WIN
6	Rito Cangurito	"Perlas Negras" by Natanael Cano & Gabito Ballesteros	Verónica Montes	OUT

=== Week 3 (October 25) ===
Performances on the third episode
#	Stage name	Song	Result	
1	Roseta Palomares	"Wassup" by Young Miko	undisclosed	WIN
2	Caco Mixtle	"Todo Lo Fue" by Lenin Ramírez	undisclosed	RISK
3	Tiburcio	"El Rey Tiburón" by Maná	Vanessa Huppenkothen	OUT
4	Licua Checo	"Ordinary" by Alex Warren	undisclosed	RISK
5	Atrapasueños	"Muévelo" by Kali Uchis	Alejandra Barros	OUT
6	Ana Conda	"Tropicoqueta" by Karol G	undisclosed	WIN

=== Week 4 (November 1) - "Day of the Dead Night" ===
- Group performance: "El Esqueleto" by Víctimas del Doctor Cerebro

Performances on the fourth episode
#	Stage name	Song	Result	
1	Carmela Tarantela	"Yo Viviré" by Celia Cruz	undisclosed	RISK
2	Octavia Ventosa	"Miss You" by Oliver Tree & Robin Schulz	Ela Velden	OUT
3	Alex Loro	"Persiana Americana" by Soda Stereo	undisclosed	WIN
4	Caco Mixtle	"La Nave del Olvido" by José José	Pablo Ruiz	OUT
5	Dr. Kaboom	"¿A Dónde Van los Muertos?" by Kinky	undisclosed	WIN
6	Patito Feo	"Rata de Dos Patas" by Paquita la del Barrio	undisclosed	RISK

=== Week 5 (November 8) - "Superhero Night" ===
Performances on the fifth episode
#	Stage name	Song	Result	
1	Slash	"El Amor de Su Vida" by Grupo Frontera & Grupo Firme	undisclosed	RISK
2	Fifi Ñera	"Espacio Sideral" by Jesse & Joy	Fabiola Guajardo	OUT
3	Licua Checo	"Bye Bye Bye" by NSYNC	undisclosed	WIN
4	Ana Conda	"Where Is My Husband!" by Raye	undisclosed	RISK
5	El Paisa	"Holding Out for a Hero" by Bonnie Tyler	Jair Sánchez	OUT
6	La Patrona	"El Ladrón" by Sonora Santanera	undisclosed	RISK
7	Roseta Palomares	"Don't You Worry Child" by Swedish House Mafia feat. John Martin	undisclosed	WIN

=== Week 6 (November 15) - "Wedding Night" ===
Performances on the sixth episode
#	Stage name	Song	Result	
1	Carmela Tarantela	"Qué Vengan Los Bomberos" by Daniela Romo	Marisol del Olmo	OUT
2	Alex Loro	"Ahora Te Puedes Marchar" by Luis Miguel	undisclosed	RISK
3	La Patrona	"El Chico del Apartamento 512" by Selena	undisclosed	RISK
4	Licua Checo	"Danza Kuduro" by Don Omar & Lucenzo	undisclosed	WIN
5	Patito Feo	"Mírala, Míralo" by Alejandra Guzmán	undisclosed	RISK
6	Slash	"Macarena" by Los del Río	Marcus Ornellas	OUT
7	Ana Conda	"Suavemente" by Elvis Crespo	undisclosed	WIN
8	Dr. Kaboom	"¿Y Todo Para Qué?" by Intocable	undisclosed	WIN
9	Roseta Palomares	"Que nadie sepa mi sufrir" by Hugo del Carril	undisclosed	RISK

== Ratings ==
Show	Episode	Air date	Timeslot (CT)	Viewers (millions)
1	"El inicio de un nuevo ciclo"	October 11, 2026	Sunday; 8:30 p.m.	3.54
2	"El amor en el escenario"	October 18, 2026	Sunday; 8:30 p.m.	3.43
3	"Seis nuevas presentaciones alucinantes"	October 25, 2026	Sunday; 8:30 p.m.	3.78
4	"Día de Muertos"	November 1, 2026	Sunday; 8:30 p.m.	3.01
5	"Superhéroes"	November 8, 2026	Sunday; 8:30 p.m.	3.41
6	"La boda"	November 15, 2026	Sunday; 8:30 p.m.	3.01
