= List of ¿Quién es la máscara? (Mexican TV series) episodes =

¿Quién es la máscara? is a Mexican reality singing competition television series based on the South Korean television program King of Mask Singer. The show involves a group of celebrities that hide behind a character and, week after week, panelists will try to discover who is behind the mask. The show is hosted by Omar Chaparro.

As of November 15, 2026, 73 episodes of ¿Quién es la máscara? have aired, currently in its eighth season.

== Series overview ==
Season	Episodes	Originally released	
Season	Episodes	First released	Last released
1	8	August 25, 2019	October 13, 2019
2	10	October 11, 2020	December 13, 2020
3	10	October 10, 2021	December 19, 2021
4	10	October 16, 2022	December 18, 2022
5	10	October 15, 2023	December 17, 2023
6	10	October 20, 2024	December 22, 2024
7	10	October 12, 2025	December 14, 2025
8	TBA	October 11, 2026	TBA

== Episodes ==
=== Season 1 (2019) ===
No. overall	No. in season	Title	Original release date	Mexico viewers (millions)
1	1	"Ciervo y Gallo acaban con el misterio"	August 25, 2019	4.0
2	2	"¡Abejorro y Panda a punto de revelar su identidad!"	September 1, 2019	4.3
3	3	"Dos celebridades más al descubierto"	September 8, 2019	4.5
4	4	"La competencia toma un giro inesperado"	September 15, 2019	2.6
5	5	"Una nueva identidad ha quedado revelada"	September 22, 2019	3.9
6	6	"Sin pistas, el misterio crece más"	September 29, 2019	3.7
7	7	"¡Los finalistas ya están definidos!"	October 6, 2019	4.4
8	8	"El misterio terminó"	October 13, 2019	5.3

=== Season 2 (2020) ===
No. overall	No. in season	Title	Original release date	Mexico viewers (millions)
9	1	"Noche de presentaciones"	October 11, 2020	3.8
10	2	"Confusión por partida doble"	October 18, 2020	4.2
11	3	"Noche de muchas más sorpresas"	October 25, 2020	3.8
12	4	"Máscara contra máscara"	November 1, 2020	3.3
13	5	"Pelea por mi máscara"	November 8, 2020	4.4
14	6	"Todos sobre el escenario"	November 15, 2020	3.8
15	7	"El Escorpión Dorado hace enloquecer a todos"	November 22, 2020	3.9
16	8	"Galilea Montijo estelariza el domingo de locura"	November 29, 2020	3.4
17	9	"La semifinal"	December 6, 2020	4.0
18	10	"Gran final"	December 13, 2020	3.9

=== Season 3 (2021) ===
No. overall	No. in season	Title	Original release date	Mexico viewers (millions)
19	1	"Una noche llena de sorpresas"	October 10, 2021	3.9
20	2	"El escenario está lleno de magia"	October 17, 2021	3.8
21	3	"Las sorpresas no paran de llegar"	October 24, 2021	3.6
22	4	"Máscara vs. máscara"	October 31, 2021	3.0
23	5	"Una noche que cautivará a todos"	November 7, 2021	3.9
24	6	"Todo el talento sobre el escenario"	November 14, 2021	3.6
25	7	"Un gran misterio está por revelarse"	November 21, 2021	3.3
26	8	"La final está cada vez más cerca"	November 28, 2021	3.5
27	9	"Por un lugar en la final"	December 5, 2021	3.7
28	10	"La última sorpresa"	December 19, 2021	N/A

=== Season 4 (2022) ===
No. overall	No. in season	Title	Original release date	Mexico viewers (millions)
29	1	"El inicio de un sueño"	October 16, 2022	3.1
30	2	"Nuevos personajes en duelo"	October 23, 2022	2.9
31	3	"Pistas que distraen de la verdad"	October 30, 2022	2.9
32	4	"Dos personajes menos en la competencia"	November 6, 2022	3.2
33	5	"Fuera máscara"	November 13, 2022	3.2
34	6	"Un talento desperdiciado"	November 20, 2022	3.0
35	7	"Dr. Veneno está en el escenario"	November 27, 2022	3.3
36	8	"Cinco en secreto"	December 4, 2022	2.7
37	9	"Camino a la semifinal"	December 11, 2022	2.6
38	10	"La gran final"	December 18, 2022	N/A

=== Season 5 (2023) ===
No. overall	No. in season	Title	Original release date	Mexico viewers (millions)
39	1	"Wendy, perdida o investigadora"	October 15, 2023	2.9
40	2	"Espectáculos que dan de qué hablar"	October 22, 2023	3.2
41	3	"Los últimos seis"	October 29, 2023	2.8
42	4	"Las sorpresas no paran"	November 5, 2023	2.6
43	5	"Dos personajes fuera"	November 12, 2023	3.0
44	6	"Uno más y dos menos"	November 19, 2023	2.5
45	7	"Pronósticos arriesgados"	November 26, 2023	2.6
46	8	"El gran enigma"	December 3, 2023	2.7
47	9	"La sorprendente semifinal"	December 10, 2023	2.6
48	10	"La gran final"	December 17, 2023	2.2

=== Season 6 (2024) ===
No. overall	No. in season	Title	Original release date	Mexico viewers (millions)
49	1	"Siete personalidades"	October 20, 2024	2.99
50	2	"Nuevos personajes"	October 27, 2024	2.61
51	3	"Personajes de fantasia"	November 3, 2024	2.47
52	4	"El poder del juez"	November 10, 2024	2.69
53	5	"Un boton, muchas consecuencias"	November 17, 2024	2.51
54	6	"Un nuevo juez"	November 24, 2024	2.53
55	7	"Noche de telenovela"	December 1, 2024	2.28
56	8	"Al estilo ranchero"	December 8, 2024	N/A
57	9	"Semifinal"	December 15, 2024	N/A
58	10	"La gran final"	December 22, 2024	N/A

=== Season 7 (2025) ===
No. overall	No. in season	Title	Original release date	Mexico viewers (millions)
59	1	"Conociendo al talento"	October 12, 2025	4.71
60	2	"Los siguientes seis"	October 19, 2025	3.85
61	3	"Voces que engañan"	October 26, 2025	4.21
62	4	"Los monstruosos ocho"	November 2, 2025	4.24
63	5	"Disfraces y máscaras"	November 9, 2025	4.20
64	6	"Al estilo del arte"	November 16, 2025	4.14
65	7	"Pijamas y comodidad"	November 23, 2025	3.85
66	8	"Rumbo a la semifinal"	November 30, 2025	3.83
67	9	"Semifinal de deportes"	December 7, 2025	3.75
68	10	"Gran final"	December 14, 2025	3.59

=== Season 8 (2026) ===
No. overall	No. in season	Title	Original release date	Mexico viewers (millions)
69	1	"El inicio de un nuevo ciclo"	October 11, 2026	3.54
70	2	"El amor en el escenario"	October 18, 2026	3.43
71	3	"Seis nuevas presentaciones alucinantes"	October 25, 2026	3.78
72	4	"Día de Muertos"	November 1, 2026	3.01
73	5	"Superhéroes"	November 8, 2026	3.41
74	6	"La boda"	November 15, 2026	3.01

== Viewership and ratings ==
¿Quién es la máscara? : Mexico viewers per episode (millions)
Source: (Note: The viewership statistics in the graph and table are sourced from the citations in the season-specific tables above.)
