= ¿Quién es la máscara? (Mexican TV series) season 7 =

¿Quién es la máscara?
- Season 7
- Hosted by: Omar Chaparro
- Judges: Carlos Rivera; Juanpa Zurita; Anahí; Ana Brenda Contreras
- No. of contestants: 18
- Winner: Paulina Goto as "Tropi Coco"
- Runner-up: Gabriel Soto as "Carro Ñero"
- No. of episodes: 10

Release
- Original network: Las Estrellas
- Original release: October 12 – December 14, 2025

Season chronology
- ← Previous; Season 6

The seventh season of the Mexican television series ¿Quién es la máscara? premiered on Las Estrellas on October 12, 2025. On December 14, 2025, Tropi Coco (actress and singer Paulina Goto) was declared the winner, and Carro Ñero (actor Gabriel Soto) the runner-up.

== Production ==
This is the second season to air simultaneously in the United States on Univision. The "Sálvame" (Save Me) button returns and gives the panelists the chance to save a singer from elimination. Each of the panelists can use the button only once during the season. However, unlike the previous season, where after saving someone with the button and a contestant saved by the audience still had to reveal their identity, all contestants in that group are safe and remain in the competition. The show also began incorporating the use of artificial intelligence into clue packages and other elements of the program. The season features 18 new costumes.

== Panelists and host ==
Season 7 panelists and host

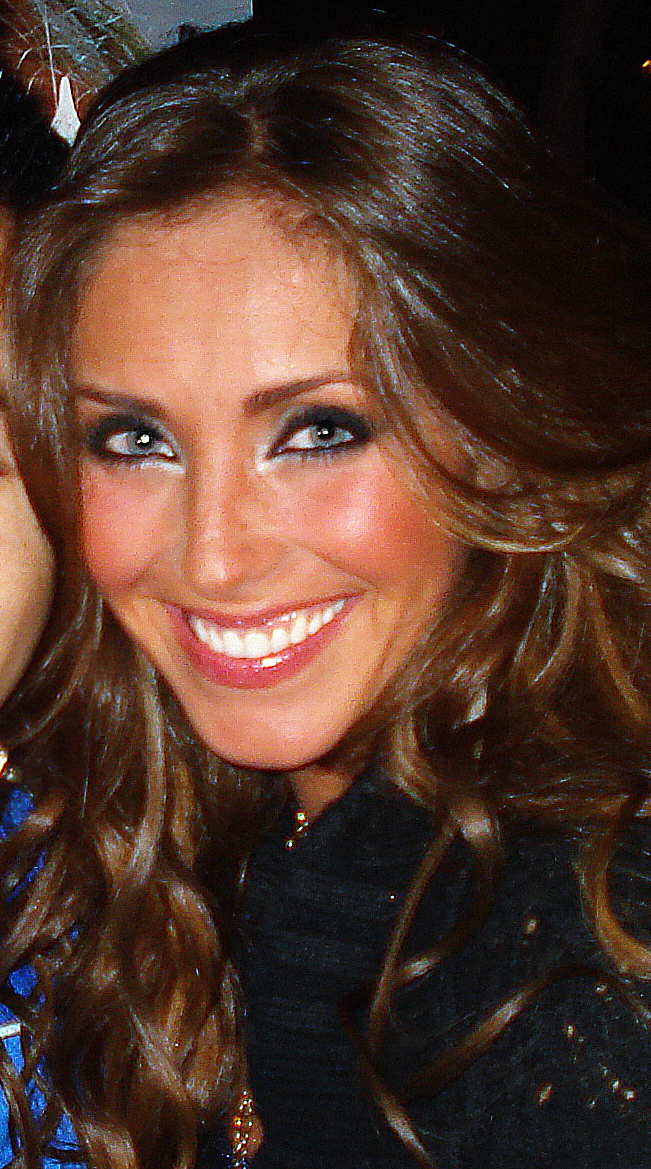
Anahí

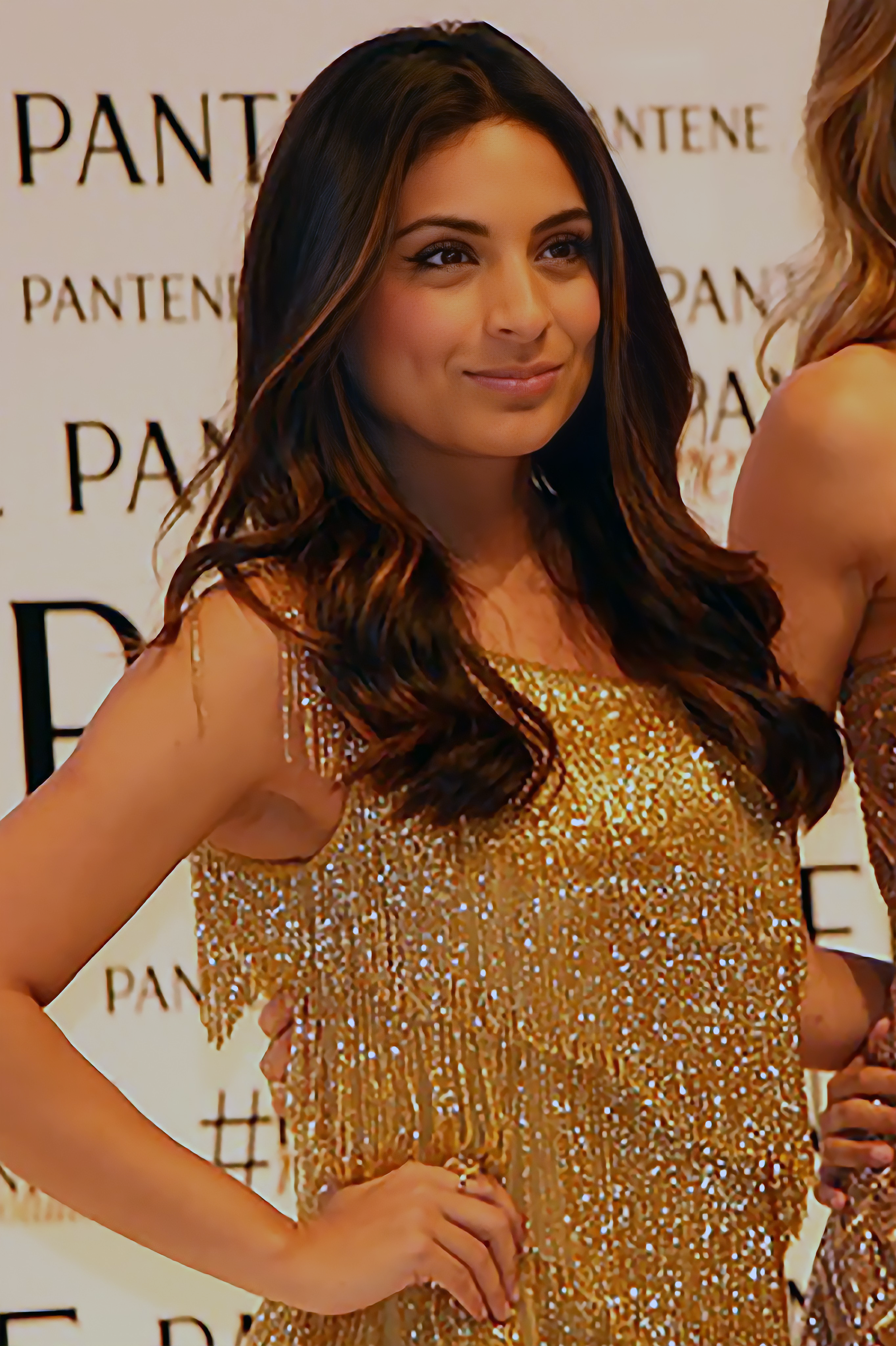
Ana Brenda Contreras

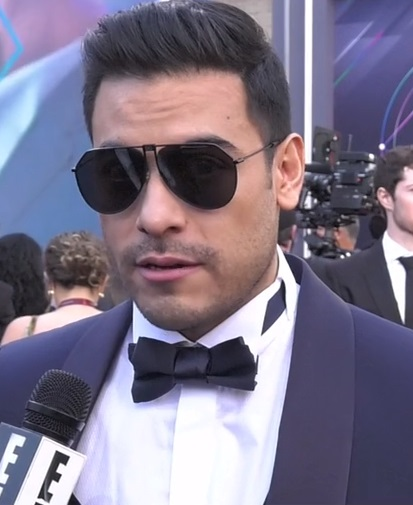
Carlos Rivera

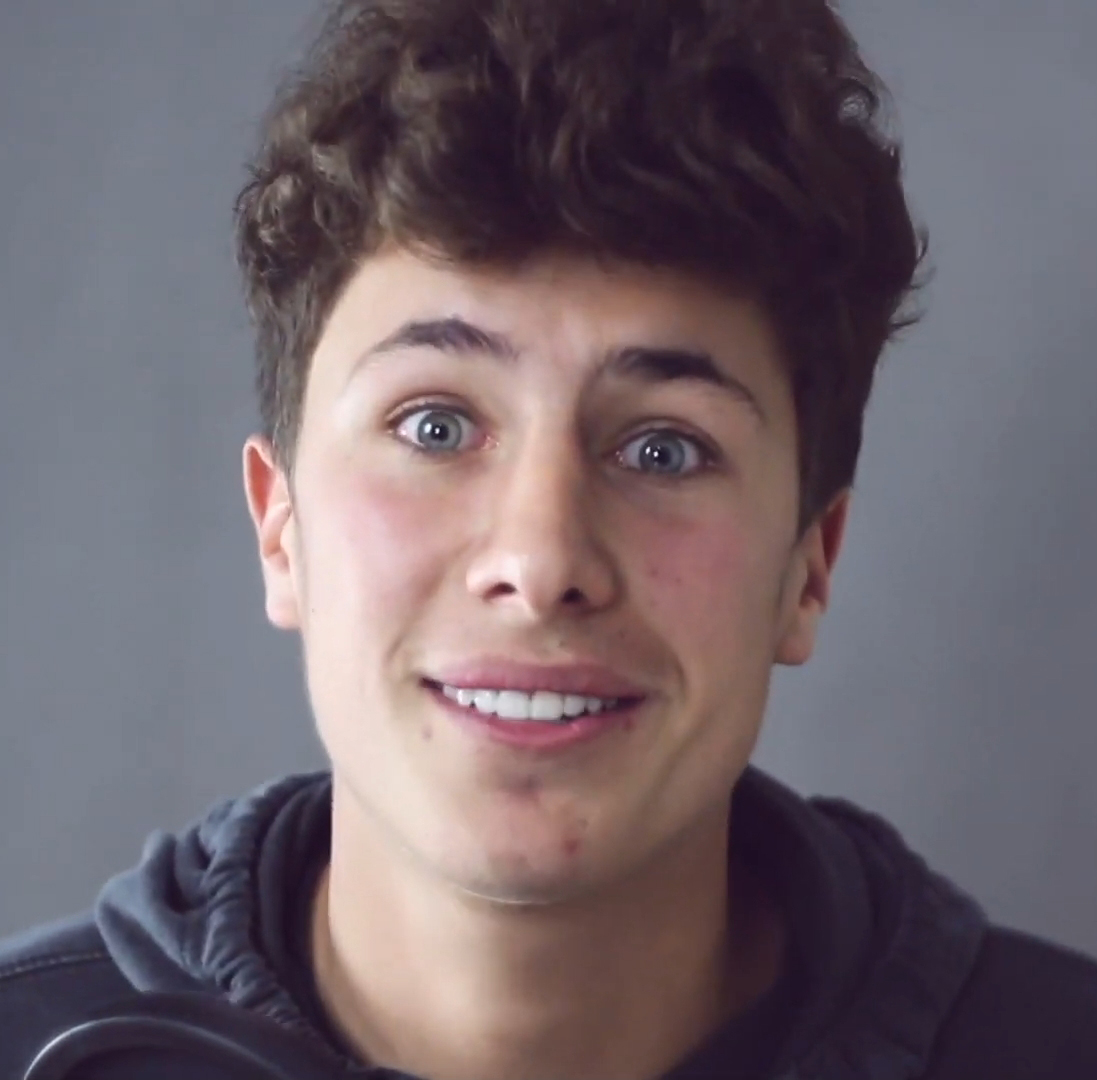
Juanpa Zurita

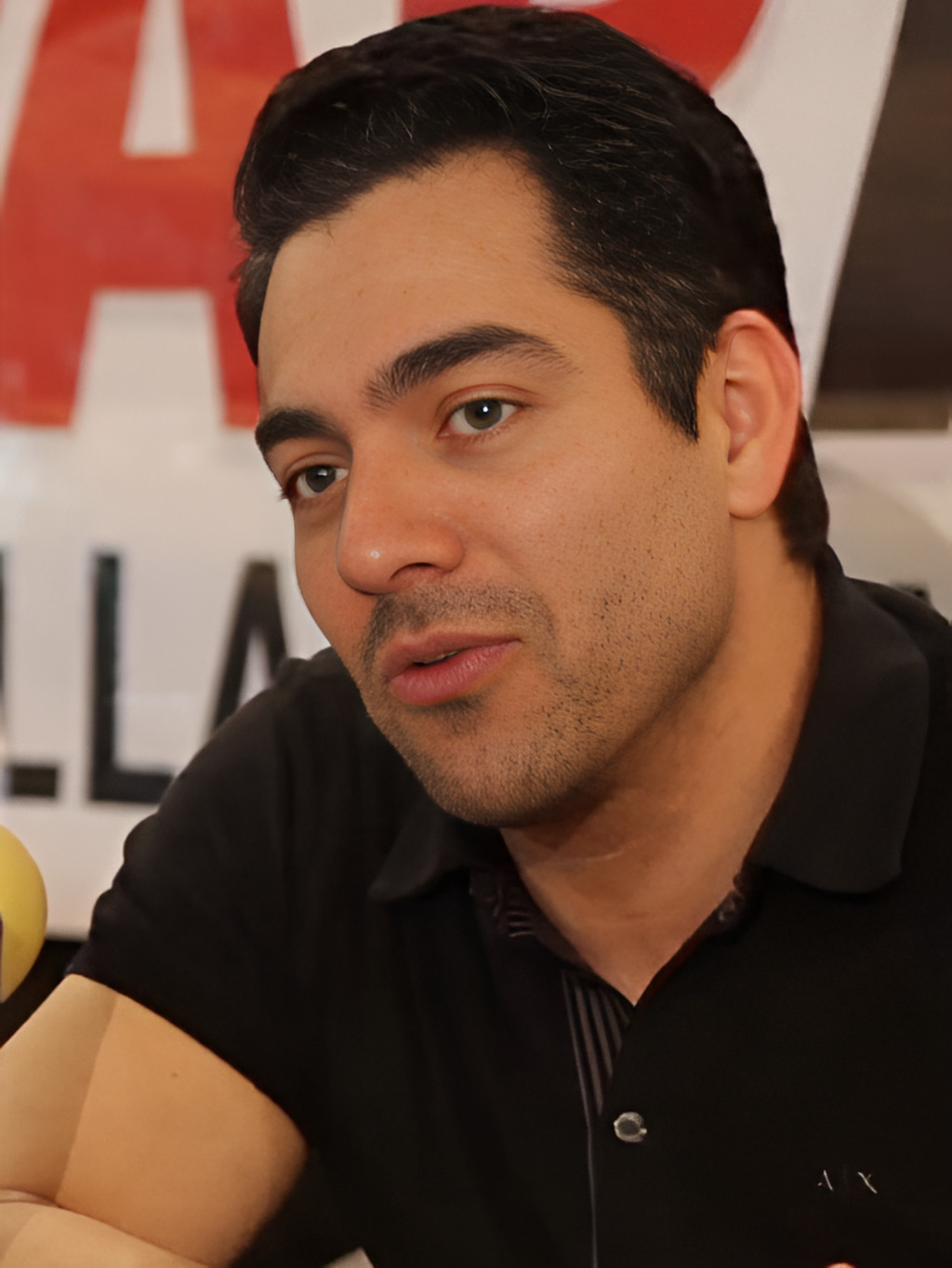
Omar Chaparro

Singer Carlos Rivera, social media influencer Juanpa Zurita, and singer and actress Anahí returned as panelists. Martha Higareda did not return as a panelist, being replaced by actress Ana Brenda Contreras. Omar Chaparro returned as host.

Throughout the season, various guest panelists appeared as the fifth panelist in the panel for one episode. These guest panelists included actress and season one contestant Michelle Rodríguez (episode 6), actress Yadhira Carrillo (episode 7), and journalist Danielle Dithurbide (episode 8).

== Contestants ==
Results
Stage name	Celebrity	Occupation(s)	Episodes										
Stage name	Celebrity	Occupation(s)	1	2	3	4	5	6	7	8	9	10	
Stage name	Celebrity	Occupation(s)	1	2	3	4	5	6	7	8	9	A	B
Tropi Coco	Paulina Goto	Actress and singer	WIN			WIN			WIN	WIN	WIN	SAFE	WINNER
Carro Ñero	Gabriel Soto	Actor			WIN		RISK		WIN	RISK	RISK	SAFE	RUNNER-UP
Metaliebre	Marie Claire Harp	TV personality	RISK				WIN	WIN		WIN	RISK	OUT	
Maestro Bops	Daniel Sosa	Comedian			WIN	WIN		RISK		WIN	WIN	OUT	
Hieny Fer	Oka Giner	Actress			RISK		WIN		RISK	RISK	OUT		
Nocturna	Ari Gameplays	Internet personality		WIN		WIN		RISK		WIN	OUT		
Capi Bara	Diego Klein	Actor		WIN		KEPT (Note: While in the middle of their unmasking, panelist Anahí used the "Sálvame" button to save Capi Bara from elimination, allowing the portrayer to keep their mask on and continue in the competition.)			RISK	OUT			
Samurái	Eduardo España	Actor and comedian	KEPT (Note: While in the middle of their unmasking, panelist Ana Brenda Contreras used the "Sálvame" button to save Samurái from elimination, allowing the portrayer to keep their mask on and continue in the competition.)				WIN	WIN		OUT			
Federico García	Rodrigo Murray	Actor	RISK			WIN			OUT				
María Ovina	Wendy Guevara	Influencer			RISK		RISK		OUT				
Sonny Hámster	Odalys Ramírez	TV host		RISK		RISK		OUT					
Tony Manguera	Julián Gil	Actor and TV host		RISK		RISK		OUT					
Mini Chang	Maribel Guardia	Actress and singer			KEPT (Note: While in the middle of their unmasking, panelist Carlos Rivera used the "Sálvame" button to save Mini Chang from elimination, allowing the portrayer to keep their mask on and continue in the competition.)		OUT						
Ruby Gloss	Cynthia Klitbo	Actress		KEPT (Note: While in the middle of their unmasking, panelist Juanpa Zurita used the "Sálvame" button to save Ruby Gloss from elimination, allowing the portrayer to keep their mask on and continue in the competition.)			OUT						
Monsqueeze	Jesús Ochoa	Actor	WIN			OUT							
Sonaja, Chupón y Bebé	Freddy and Germán Ortega	Comedians			OUT								
Bebeee	Marlene Favela	Actress		OUT									
Shiba Moon	Adamari López	TV personality	OUT										

The masked singer won their face-off and remained in the competition.
The masked singer lost their face-off, but was not eliminated.
The masked singer was safe from elimination.
The masked singer was saved from elimination by a panelist using the "Sálvame" button.
The masked singer was eliminated from the competition.
The masked singer did not perform.
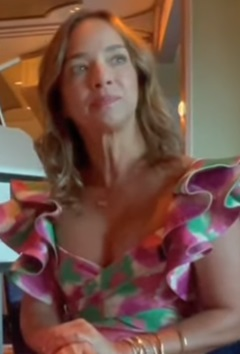
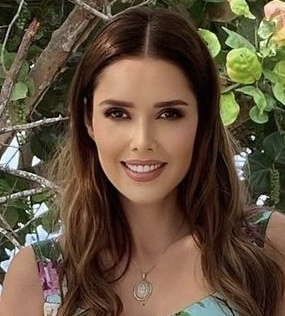
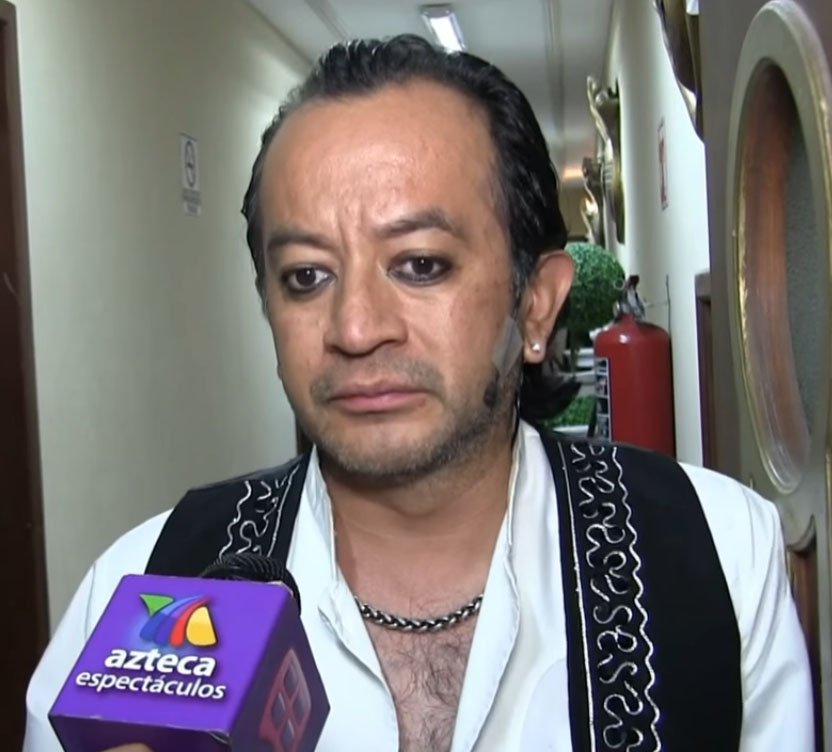
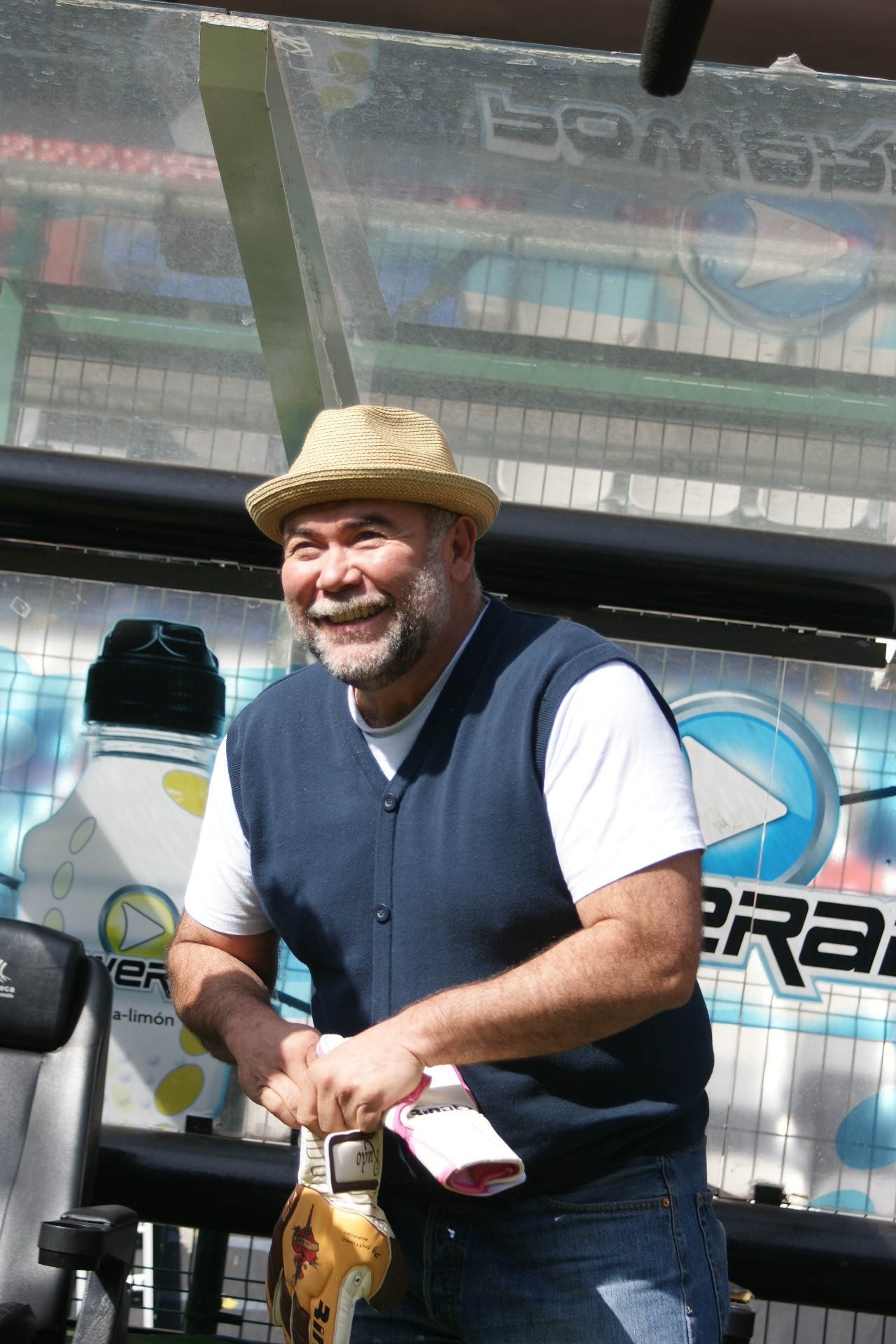
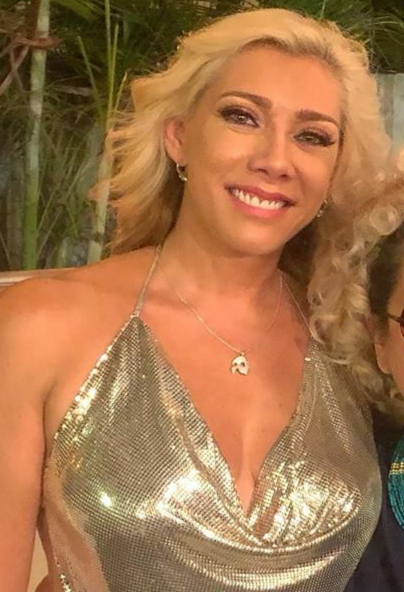
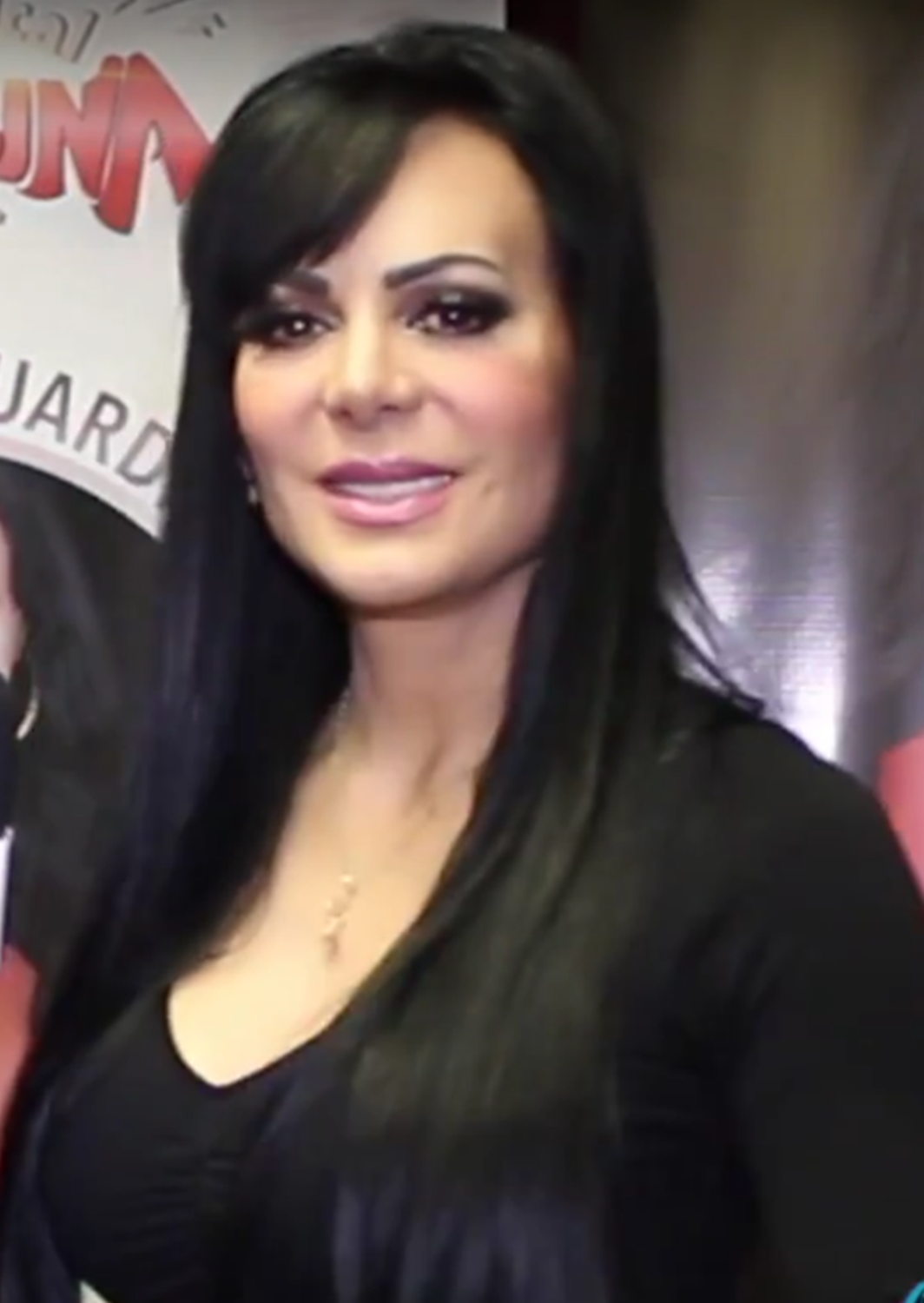
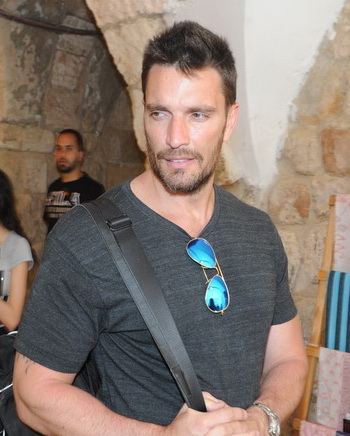
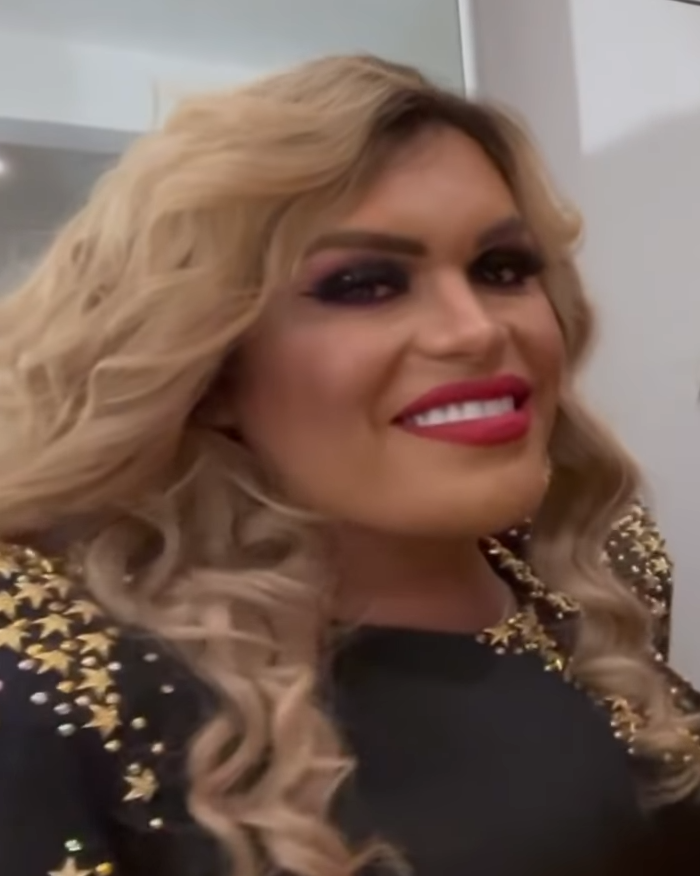
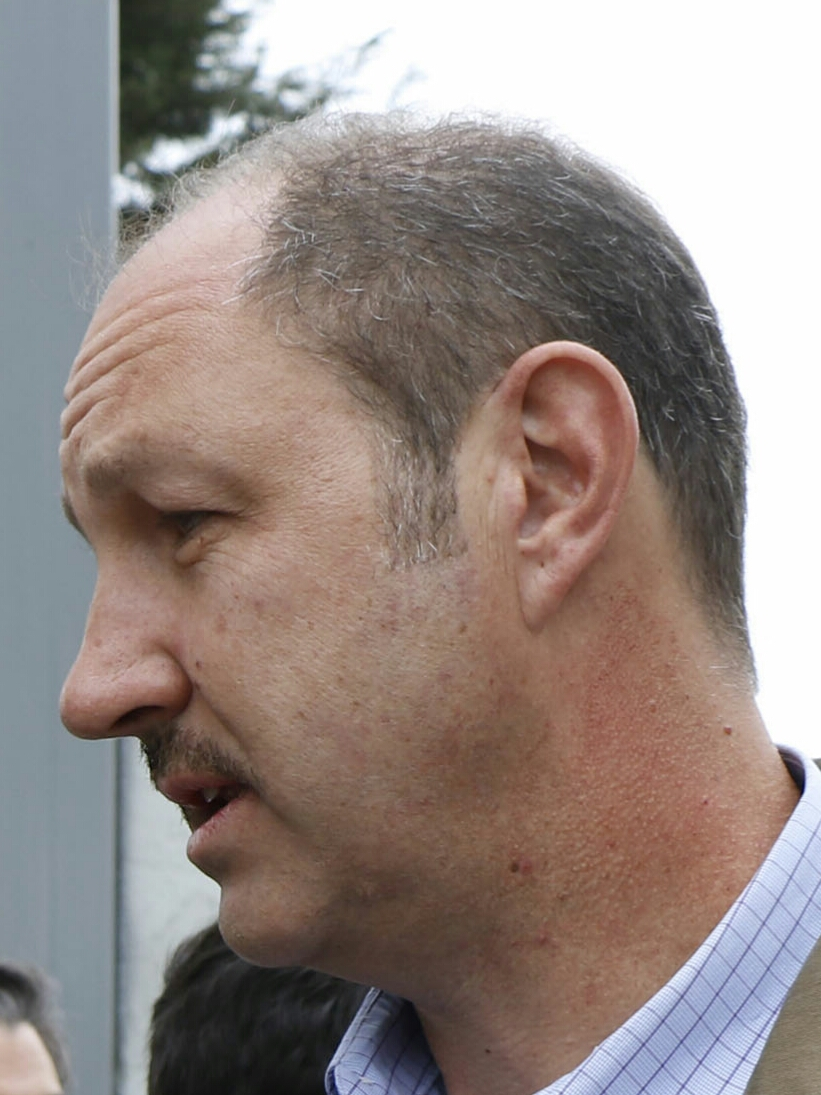
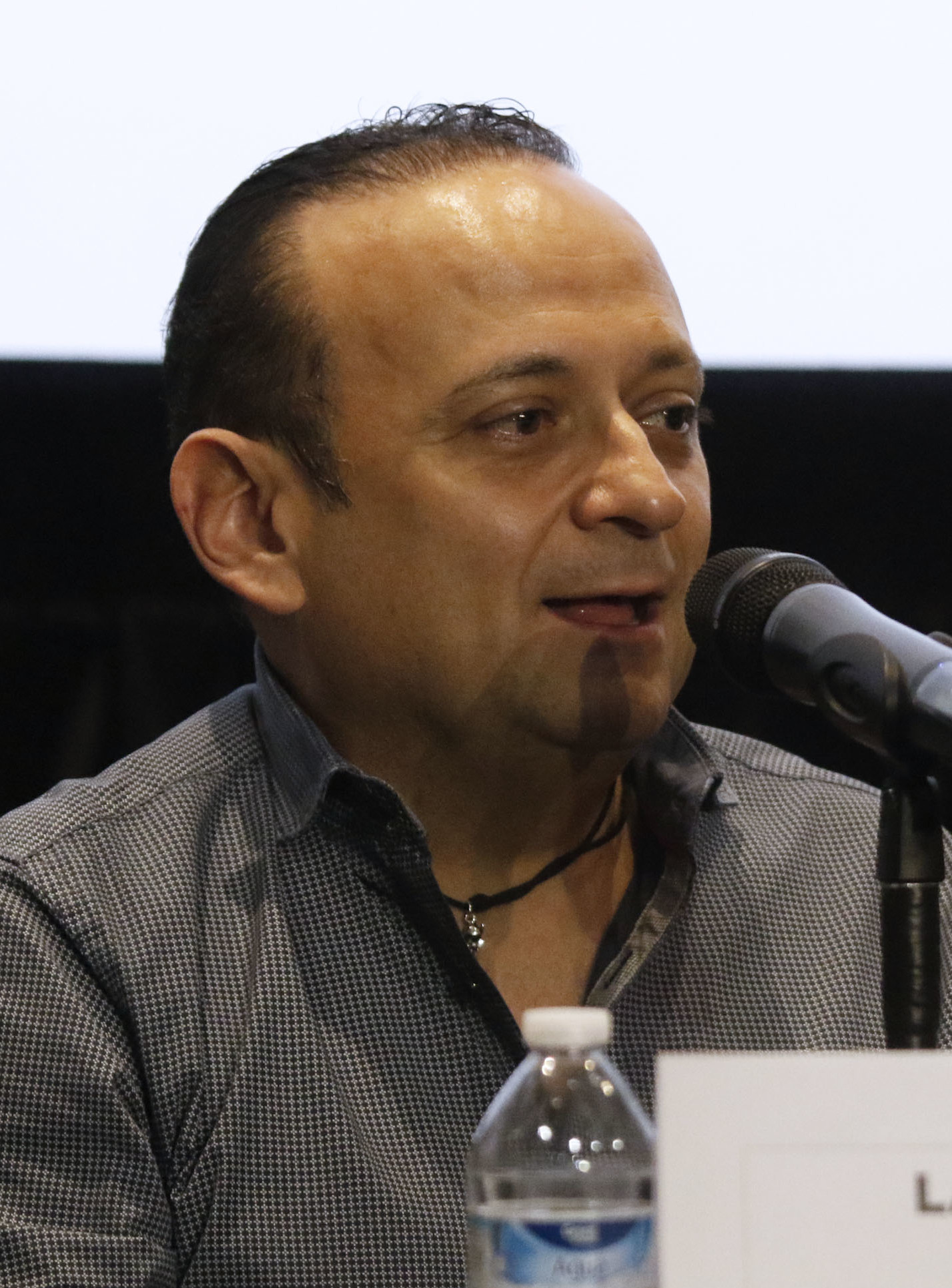
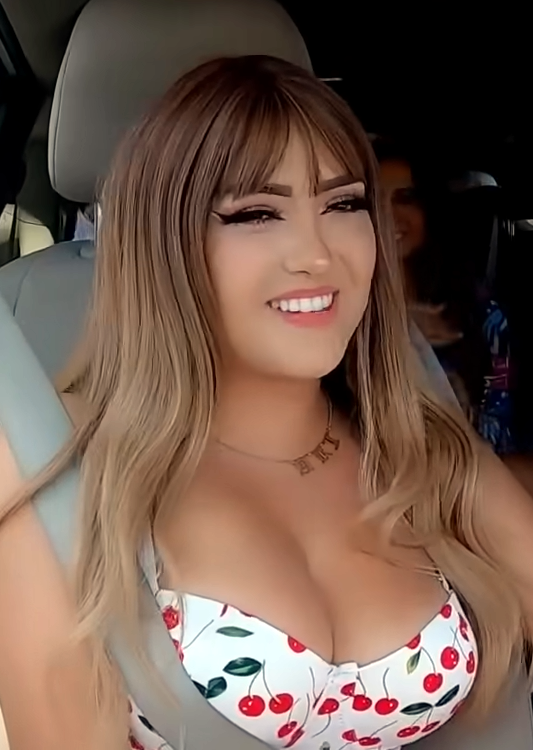
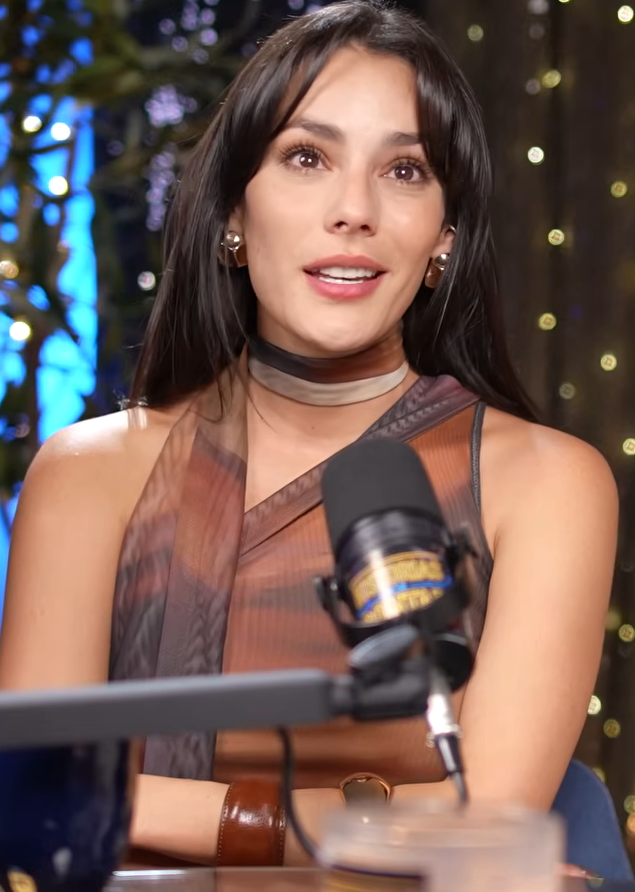
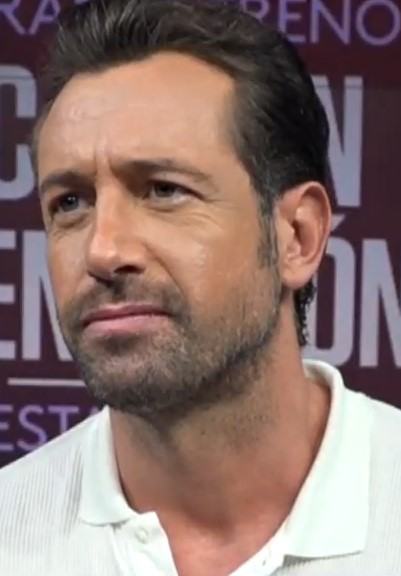
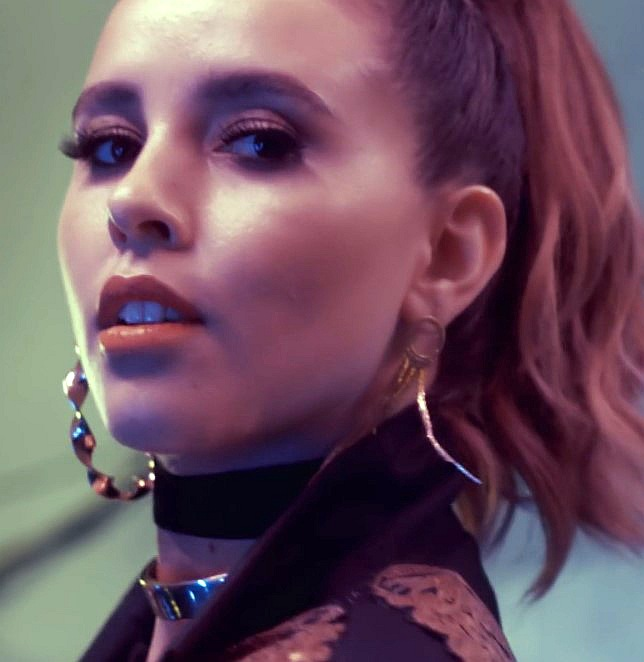
The celebrities who competed in the seventh season of ¿Quién es la máscara?, pictured in order of elimination (L-R):
Adamarí López ("Shiba Moon"), Marlene Favela ("Bebeee"), Germán Ortega ("Sonaja, Chupón y Bebé"), Jesús Ochoa ("Monsqueeze"), Cynthia Klitbo ("Ruby Gloss"), Maribel Guardia ("Mini Chang"), Julián Gil ("Tony Manguera"), Wendy Guevara ("María Ovina"), Rodrigo Murray ("Federico García"), Eduardo España ("Samurái"), Ari Gameplays ("Nocturna"), Oka Giner ("Hieny Fer"), Gabriel Soto ("Carro Ñero"), and Paulina Goto ("Tropi Coco")
Not pictured: Freddy Ortega ("Sonaja, Chupón y Bebé"), Odalys Ramírez ("Sonny Hámster"),
Diego Klein ("Capi Bara"), Daniel Sosa ("Maestro Bops"), and Marie Claire Harp ("Metaliebre")

== Episodes ==
=== Week 1 (October 12) ===
Performances on the first episode
#	Stage name	Song	Result	
1	Tropi Coco	"Conga" by Miami Sound Machine	undisclosed	WIN
2	Samurái	"Me Jalo" by Fuerza Regida & Grupo Frontera	undisclosed	KEPT
3	Metaliebre	"Cómo Te Atreves" by Morat	undisclosed	RISK
4	Shiba Moon	"Greedy" by Tate McRae	Adamari López	OUT
5	Federico García	"Livin' la Vida Loca" by Ricky Martin	undisclosed	RISK
6	Monsqueeze	"Ese Vato No Te Queda" by Carin León & Gabito Ballesteros	undisclosed	WIN

=== Week 2 (October 19) ===
Performances on the second episode
#	Stage name	Song	Result	
1	Sonny Hámster	"I Like the Way You Kiss Me" by Artemas	undisclosed	RISK
2	Capi Bara	"Cristina" by Sebastián Yatra	undisclosed	WIN
3	Ruby Gloss	"¿A quién le importa?" by Alaska y Dinarama	undisclosed	KEPT
4	Bebeee	"Papasito" by Karol G	Marlene Favela	OUT
5	Tony Manguera	"Cásate Conmigo" by Nicky Jam & Silvestre Dangond	undisclosed	RISK
6	Nocturna	"Born This Way" by Lady Gaga	undisclosed	WIN

=== Week 3 (October 26) ===
Performances on the third episode
#	Stage name	Song	Result	
1	Mini Chang	"Probablemente" by Christian Nodal ft. David Bisbal	undisclosed	KEPT
2	Carro Ñero	"Loco" by Netón Vega	undisclosed	WIN
3	María Ovina	"Gata Only" by FloyyMenor & Cris MJ	undisclosed	RISK
4	Sonaja, Chupón y Bebé	"Lo Que Pasó, Pasó" by Daddy Yankee	Freddy and Germán Ortega	OUT
5	Hieny Fer	"Suerte" by Shakira	undisclosed	RISK
6	Maestro Bops	"Lose Control" by Teddy Swims	undisclosed	WIN

=== Week 4 (November 2) ===
Performances on the fourth episode
#	Stage name	Song	Result	
1	Maestro Bops	"Por Esos Ojos" by Fuerza Regida	undisclosed	WIN
2	Sonny Hámster	"Una Vida Pasada" by Camilo & Carín León	undisclosed	RISK
3	Capi Bara	"Según Quién" by Maluma & Carín León	undisclosed	KEPT
4	Federico García	"Feeling Good" by Nina Simone	undisclosed	WIN
5	Monsqueeze	"Chale" by Eden Muñoz	Jesús Ochoa	OUT
6	Nocturna	"Toxic" by Britney Spears	undisclosed	WIN
7	Tony Manguera	"Peligrosa" by FloyyMenor	undisclosed	RISK
8	Tropi Coco	"Too Sweet" by Hozier	undisclosed	WIN

=== Week 5 (November 9) ===
Performances on the fifth episode
#	Stage name	Song	Result	
1	Metaliebre	"La Boda del Huitlacoche" by Carín León	undisclosed	WIN
2	Ruby Gloss	"Amante Bandido" by Miguel Bosé	Cynthia Klitbo	OUT
3	María Ovina	"El Efecto" by Rauw Alejandro & Chencho Corleone	undisclosed	RISK
4	Hieny Fer	"Verano Rosa" by Karol G & Feid	undisclosed	WIN
5	Mini Chang	"Hawái" by Maluma	Maribel Guardia	OUT
6	Samurái	"El Perdón" by Nicky Jam	undisclosed	WIN
7	Carro Ñero	"Cosas Pendientes" by Maluma	undisclosed	RISK

=== Week 6 (November 16) ===
Performances on the sixth episode
#	Stage name	Song	Result	
1	Tony Manguera	"Volví a Nacer" by Carlos Vives	Julián Gil	OUT
2	Maestro Bops	"Cuando Nadie Ve" by Morat	undisclosed	RISK
3	Metaliebre	"Livin' on a Prayer" by Bon Jovi	undisclosed	WIN
4	Sonny Hámster	"Víveme" by Laura Pausini	Odalys Ramírez	OUT
5	Nocturna	"Seven Nation Army" by The White Stripes	undisclosed	RISK
6	Samurái	"Con Todos Menos Conmigo" by Timbiriche	undisclosed	WIN

=== Week 7 (November 23) ===
Performances on the seventh episode
#	Stage name	Song	Result	
1	Capi Bara	"Besos en Guerra" by Morat & Juanes	undisclosed	RISK
2	María Ovina	"Todos Me Miran" by Gloria Trevi	Wendy Guevara	OUT
3	Tropi Coco	"Sin Pijama" by Becky G & Natti Natasha	undisclosed	WIN
4	Federico García	"Sabina" by Christian Nodal	Rodrigo Murray	OUT
5	Hieny Fer	"Amantes" by Mike Bahía & Greeicy	undisclosed	RISK
6	Carro Ñero	"El Taxi" by Pitbull ft. Sensato & Osmani García	undisclosed	WIN

=== Week 8 (November 30) ===
Performances on the eighth episode
#	Stage name	Song	Result	
1	Carro Ñero	"Coqueta" by Fuerza Regida & Grupo Frontera	undisclosed	RISK
2	Samurái	"Toda La Vida" by Emmanuel	Eduardo España	OUT
3	Tropi Coco	"Mejor Que Ayer" by Diego Torres	undisclosed	WIN
4	Maestro Bops	"Aviso Importante" by Carín León & Bolela	undisclosed	WIN
5	Hieny Fer	"El Amor De Mi Vida" by Los Ángeles Azules & María Becerra	undisclosed	RISK
6	Capi Bara	"El Merengue" by Marshmello & Manuel Turizo	Diego Klein	OUT
7	Nocturna	"Please Please Please" by Sabrina Carpenter	undisclosed	WIN
8	Metaliebre	"La Chona" by Los Tucanes de Tijuana	undisclosed	WIN

=== Week 9 (December 7) ===
- Group performance: "Quevedo: Bzrp Music Sessions, Vol. 52" by Bizarrap & Quevedo

Performances on the ninth episode
#	Stage name	Song	Result	
1	Maestro Bops	"Eye of the Tiger" by Survivor	undisclosed	WIN
2	Nocturna	"Rosa Pastel" by Belanova	Ari Gameplays	OUT
3	Carro Ñero	"La Copa de la Vida" by Ricky Martin	undisclosed	RISK
4	Hieny Fer	"Bye Bye Bye" by NSYNC	Oka Giner	OUT
5	Tropi Coco	"Waka Waka (Esto es África)" by Shakira	undisclosed	WIN
6	Metaliebre	"Cinco Minutos" by Gloria Trevi	undisclosed	RISK

=== Week 10 (December 14) ===
Performances on the tenth episode
#	Stage name	Song	Result	
Round One
1	Carro Ñero	"Mi Gente" by J Balvin & Willy William	undisclosed	SAFE
2	Maestro Bops	"September" by Earth, Wind & Fire	Daniel Sosa	OUT
3	Tropi Coco	"I Will Always Love You" by Dolly Parton	undisclosed	SAFE
4	Metaliebre	"Cum On Feel the Noize" by Slade	Marie Claire Harp	OUT
Round Two
5	Tropi Coco	"Larga Vida" by Carlos Rivera	Paulina Goto	WINNER
6	Carro Ñero	"Baila Esta Cumbia" by Selena	Gabriel Soto	RUNNER-UP

== Ratings ==
Show	Episode	Air date	Timeslot (CT)	Viewers (millions)
1	"Conociendo al talento"	October 12, 2025	Sunday; 8:30 p.m.	4.71
2	"Los siguientes seis"	October 19, 2025	Sunday; 8:30 p.m.	3.85
3	"Voces que engañan"	October 26, 2025	Sunday; 8:30 p.m.	4.21
4	"Los monstruosos ocho"	November 2, 2025	Sunday; 8:30 p.m.	4.24
5	"Disfraces y máscaras"	November 9, 2025	Sunday; 8:30 p.m.	4.20
6	"Al estilo del arte"	November 16, 2025	Sunday; 8:30 p.m.	4.14
7	"Pijamas y comodidad"	November 23, 2025	Sunday; 8:30 p.m.	3.85
8	"Rumbo a la semifinal"	November 30, 2025	Sunday; 8:30 p.m.	3.83
9	"Semifinal de deportes"	December 7, 2025	Sunday; 8:30 p.m.	3.75
10	"Gran final"	December 14, 2025	Sunday; 8:00 p.m.	3.59
