= Teletón (Mexico) =

Mexican charity telethon

- Also known as: Fundación Teletón México
- Genre: Telethon
- Country of origin: Mexico
- Original language: Spanish
- No. of episodes: 28

Production
- Camera setup: Multi-camera
- Production company: TelevisaUnivision

Original release
- Network: Las Estrellas
- Release: December 5, 1997 – present

The Fundación Teletón is a Mexican annual 24-plus-hour TV and radio broadcast in Mexico, started in 1996, based on the Chilean event of the same name, to raise money for children's rehabilitation centers (known as Centro de Rehabilitación Infantil Teletón or CRIT – "Teletón Children's Rehabilitation Center" in English). The Mexican Teletón is produced by Televisa and more than 500 Mexican and foreign media; more than 100 commercial firms sponsor the event. Teleton's mission is "to provide knowledge about physical disabilities, giving a strong message about respect, equality and support to people in these conditions". Teletón is the world's largest private medical unit and rehabilitation center for children.

Since 1997, Teletón has begun on the first Friday in December. The 2010 Teletón was held on December 3–4; as always, it was seen as "a project of national unity where Mexicans have the chance to gather and work for the same cause". From 1996 to 2003, the end of the event was marked by a concert in Azteca Stadium. Since 2004, the venue has varied: in 2004 and 2005, it was held at Mexico City's Zócalo, in 2006, at the Foro Sol and in 2007 and 2008, it was moved to the National Auditorium.

Besides creating CRITs all around the country, the CRIT system and the Universidad Autónoma del Estado de México (UAEM) signed an agreement in 2000 creating two bachelors-degree programs training professionals to work with children at the CRITs, and created the Instituto Teletón de Estudios Superiores (ITESUR) (located next to the first CRIT constructed). ITESUR is the only university in Mexico that grants degrees in occupational and physical therapy. In 2012, it was inaugurated in State of Mexico the Centro Autismo Teletón (CAT) which will help children with autism.

From 1997 to 2004, Mexican actress and pop star Lucero was involved in every Teleton as the main spokesperson for most of the broadcast, alongside different news anchor and host of other Televisa programs. In 2003, a scandal involving security guards and the press made her to have her role been downplayed, and other Televisa personalities have been included in the broadcast.

While the main reason of the Teleton is to provide help with the rehabilitation of children that suffer of different brain and mobility discapacities, in 2009 Teletón expanded the objectives to provide help in the treatment of children diagnosed with cancer, hence another event was conceived, Pelonton, consisting of the people donating locks of hair in order to create wigs for those children that suffered loss hair due to cancer treatment. In 2013, it was inaugurated the first oncology children's hospital in Latin America, named Hospital Infantil Teletón de Oncología or HITO in the city of Querétaro.

== CRIT locations ==
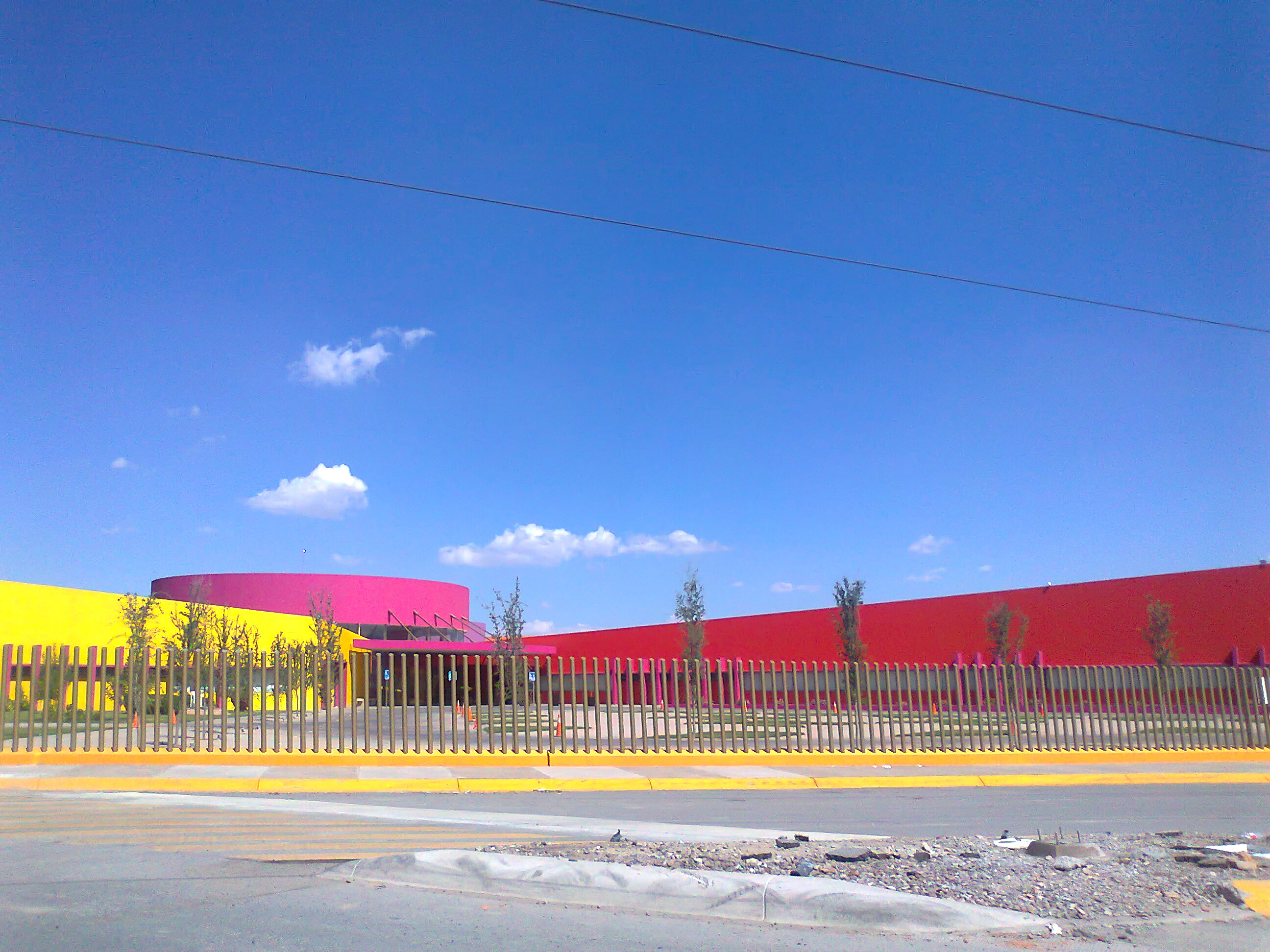
Gómez Palacio, Durango CRIT

The first Teletón was broadcast on December 12, 1997, produced by Televisa and 70 other communications media. By the end of the broadcast, its goal was surpassed. Since then, the goal has been the same amount raised the previous year, plus one Mexican peso.

From 1997 to 2014, Teletón had met its goal every year, producing surpluses which allowed the construction of twenty-one CRITs, one CAT and one HITO. The location of some CRITs is chosen on a geographical basis, so that every region has at least one; the goal is to build one in every state. Others are built in areas which have "earned" them with funds raised:

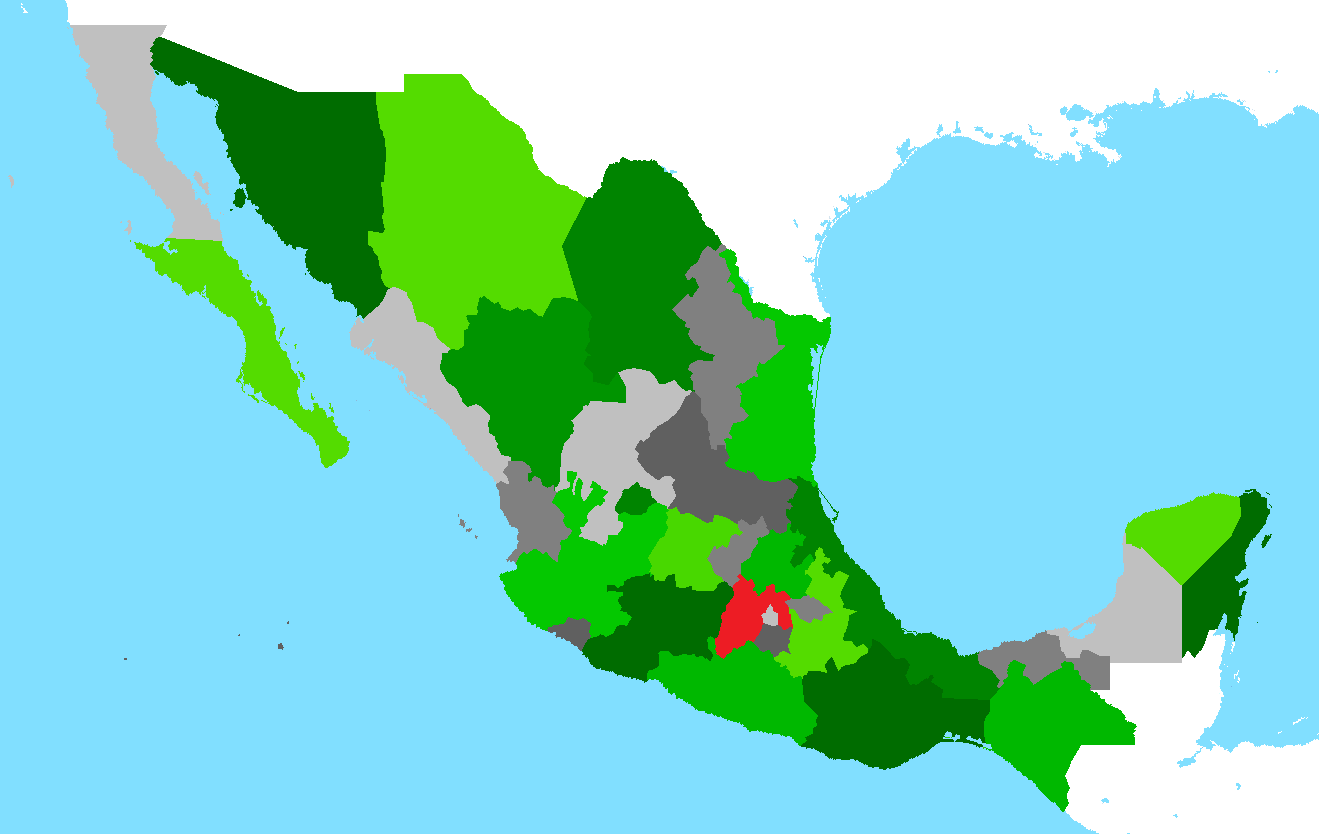
Green: states with CRITs (darker green = more CRITs)

- State of Mexico - May 13, 1999
- Jalisco - September 29, 2000
- Oaxaca - December 7, 2001
- Aguascalientes - December 6, 2002
- Coahuila - December 5, 2003
- Guanajuato - December 5, 2003
- Hidalgo - November 25, 2005
- Chihuahua - November 23, 2006
- Chiapas - November 28, 2006
- Quintana Roo - November 29, 2007
- Nezahualcóyotl, State of Mexico - November 27, 2007
- Tamaulipas - November 26, 2008
- Yucatán - January 14, 2009
- Veracruz - November 18, 2009
- Durango - November 25, 2009
- Sonora - November 15, 2010
- Baja California Sur - November 23, 2010
- Puebla - November 24, 2011
- Mexico City - November 25, 2011
- Ecatepec, State of Mexico - November 14, 2012 (Centro Autismo Teletón)
- Guerrero - November 22, 2012
- Michoacán - November 14, 2013
- Querétaro - November 21, 2013 (Hospital Infantil Teletón de Oncología)
- Baja California - December 11, 2015
- Tlapa de Comonfort - November 26, 2023
- Sinaloa - December 3, 2023

== Controversies ==
=== Tax deductions ===
Since its inception, the Telethon has been accused of allowing the companies that sponsor it to deduct taxes and be free of payments through their donations and not be transparent with the money obtained by the contributions of citizens, because these are made in an anonymous and without granting a tax receipt to support the transaction.

Faced with these accusations, the Fundación Teletón has responded declaring that the tax deduction is a legal figure permitted by the government and that the system used prevents donations from being used for tax evasion. On the other hand, the Servicio de Administración Tributaria stipulates that the maximum amount that a moral person can deduct from taxes through donations is 10% of net profit.

Researcher Sara Murúa considered that this tax method is based on a legal loophole and declared that "the fundamental problem with this type of foundation is the triangulation of its funds, which allows large donors to have privileged tax mechanisms to exempt taxes and, even, for them to declare as their own the donations of third parties, especially individuals." The latter was criticized in reference to donations made anonymously by people, thus benefiting the image of companies.

=== United Nations reactions ===
The Committee on the Rights of Persons with Disabilities of the United Nations (UN) stated in a communication, dated October 3, 2014, its concern about the way in which government resources are administered in the area of rehabilitation of persons with disabilities due to the fact that Mexico grants funds so that the Fundación Teletón - a private organization - is in charge of public health tasks that are the responsibility of the government.

At the same time, this international body criticized the way in which the Fundación Teletón makes people with disabilities look, adding that it "observes that this campaign promotes stereotypes of people with disabilities as subjects of charity [...] Also, it recommends [the committee to the Mexican government] develop programs to raise awareness about people with disabilities as rights holders". Likewise, it asks the Mexican government to investigate and prosecute institutions that apply forced sterilizations to people with disabilities, and guarantee reparations to the victims of this practice. Finally, the international organization delivered a document with 67 recommendations to the federal government of Mexico and Telethon, which to date has not been addressed.

=== 2014 anonymous donation incident ===
During the final moments of Teleton 2014, the total collected was initially announced as 418,009,379 MXN, falling short of the 473,794,379 MXN goal. Televisa then announced the event would be lengthened by an hour to try to achieve the goal. A mysterious donation of 55,785,000 MXN was then made by an anonymous party, helping surpass the stablished goal. To this day, the source of the donation remains unknown, with the public speculating that it was just a ploy to end the event in a high note.

== Media participation ==
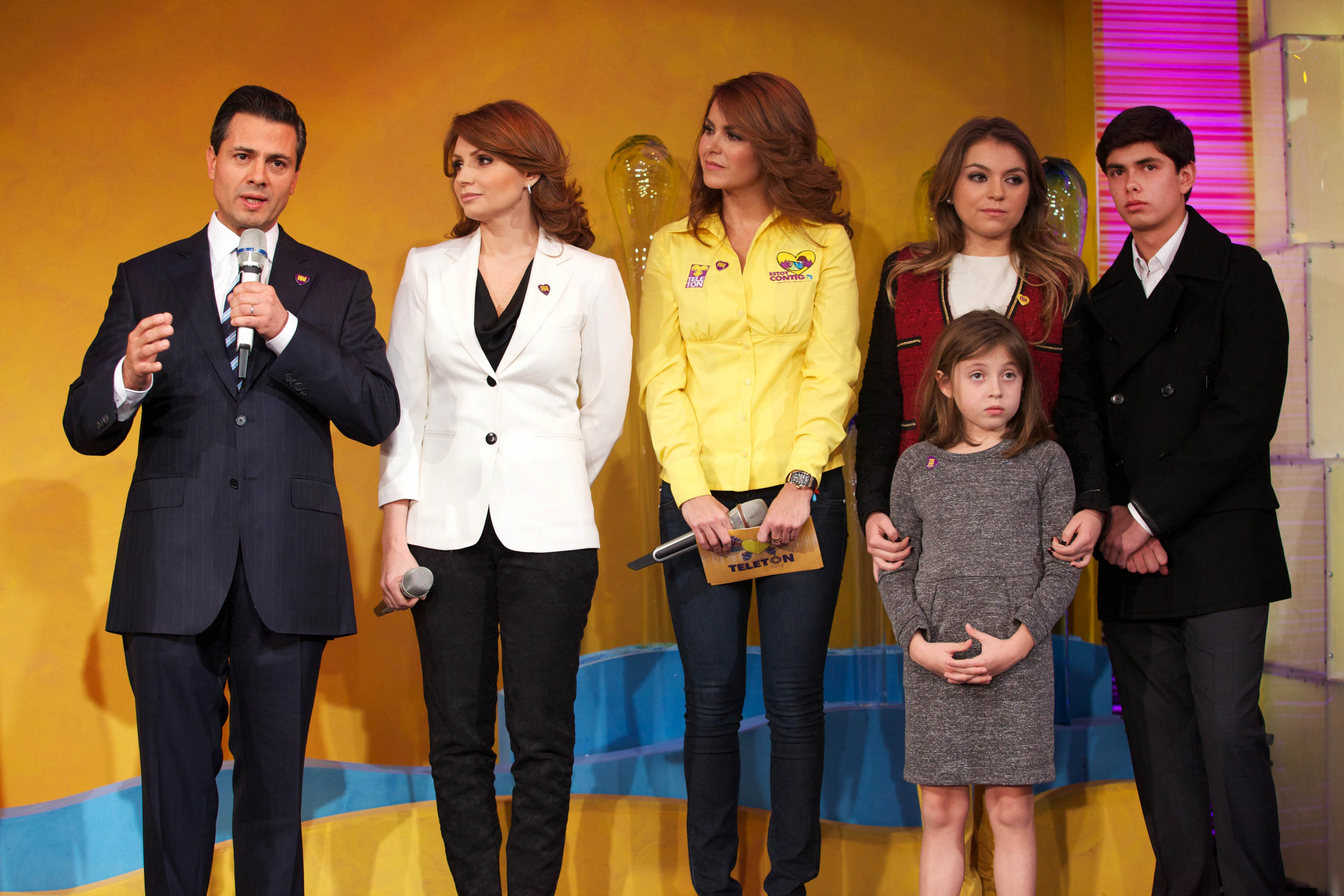
President Enrique Peña Nieto and First Lady Angélica Rivera in the 2012 Teletón

During its first broadcast, Teletón (CRIT) counted with the collaboration of 70 different national media companies; with the TV and radio stations affiliated with Televisa making it a nationwide campaign. The 2007 broadcast had the participation of more than 500 national and international media. One notable exception is TV Azteca, another major mexican media conglomerate and competitor to Televisa due to a signal-distribution conflict. 2007 also marked the first time donations from foreign countries were received.

Year	1997	1998	1999	2000	2001	2002	2003	2004	2005	2006	2007	2008	2009	2010	2011	2012	2013
Total Media	70	229	287	336	392	428	471	506	560	577	580						

Media	Number (2007)
TV Stations	72
Radio Stations	77
Newspapers	192
Magazines	131
External Media	103
International Media	5
Total	580

== Broadcasts ==
Broadcast	Dates	Goal	Total Raised	Margin (%)	Approx. USD	Motto	Translation	Mission
Teletón México 1997	December 12–13	MXN$894,000,000	MXN$338,496,8403	+73.12%	$17,015,608 _{MXN 8.1394 = USD 1}	"Juntos haremos el milagro"	"Together we will make the miracle"	To build and equip the first two CRITs in Mexico State and Occidente; Establish the Teletón Fund for Institutional Support (Fondo Teletón de Apoyo a Instituciones - FTAI) to help other institutions serving the same population; To donate 8% of the total to victims affected by Hurricane Pauline
Teletón México 1998	December 4–5	$138,496,841	$142,937,440	+3.20%	$14,365,571 _{MXN 9.95 = USD 1}	"El amor hace milagros"	"Love makes miracles"	To secure operating funds for the two CRITs; Continue the FTAI
Teletón México 1999	December 3–4	$142,937,441	$158,224,117	+10.70%	$16,598,212 _{MXN 9.5326 = USD 1}	"El amor hace milagros"	"Love makes miracles"	To grant "scholarships" for the two CRITs; Continue the FTAI
Teletón México 2000	December 8–9	$158,224,118	$201,168,475	+27.14%	$21,019,641 _{MXN 9.5705 = USD 1}	"Vamos a dar"	"Let's give"	To build and equip the third CRIT in Oaxaca; To grant "scholarships" for (and ensure future operation of) the two original CRITs; Continue the FTAI
Teletón México 2001	December 7–8	$201,168,476	$207,408,620	+3.10%	$22,446,577 _{MXN 9.2401 = USD 1}	"Te estamos esperando"	"We're waiting for you"	To build and equip the fourth CRIT in Aguascalientes; To grant "scholarships" for the three CRITs; Continue the FTAI; To donate 5% of the total raised to families of Mexican victims who died in the September 11 attacks
Teletón México 2002	December 6–7	$207,408,621	$217,876,247	+5.05%	$21,266,178 _{MXN 10.2452 = USD 1}	"¡Un paso más!"	"One more step!"	To build the fifth and sixth CRITs, in Coahuila and Guanajuato; To grant "scholarships" for the four CRITs; Continue the FTAI
Teletón México 2003	December 12–13	$217,876,248	$247,759,351	+13.72%	$22,145,691 _{MXN 11.1877 = USD 1}	"Lo hacemos todos"	"We all make it"	To equip the fifth and sixth CRITs in Coahuila and Guanajuato; To grant "scholarships" for the four CRITs; Continue the FTAI
Teletón México 2004	December 3–4	$247,759,352	$305,650,421	+23.37%	$27,424,153 _{MXN 11.1453 = USD 1}	"Unidos por el amor"	"Together for love"	To build and equip the seventh CRIT in Pachuca, Hidalgo; To grant "scholarships" for the six CRITs; Continue the FTAI
Teletón México 2005	December 2–3	$305,650,422	$349,190,470	+14.25%	$33,178,187 _{MXN 10.5247 = USD 1}	"Ayudar es amar"	"Helping is loving"	To build and equip the eighth and ninth CRITs, in Chihuahua and Chiapas; To grant "scholarships" for the seven CRITs; Continue the FTAI
Teletón México 2006	December 8–9	$349,190,471	$420,369,748	+20.38%	$38,723,055 _{MXN 10.8558 = USD 1}	"Necesitamos tu amor"	"We need your love"	To build and equip the tenth and eleventh CRITs in Nezahualcóyotl, Mexico and Cancun, Quintana Roo; Ensure operating funds for the nine CRITs; Continue the FTAI
Teletón México 2007	December 7–8	$420,369,749	$439,968,534	+4.66%	$40,599,862 _{MXN 10.8367 = USD 1}	"El Teletón eres tú"	"You are Teletón"	To build and equip the twelfth and thirteenth CRITs in Tamaulipas and Yucatán; Ensure operating funds for the eleven CIRTs; Continue the FTAI; To donate 10% of the total raised to help the affected populations of the 2007 Tabasco flood and Chiapas landslides
Teletón México 2008	December 5–6	$439,968,535	$440,404,909	+0.09%	$32,119,382 _{MXN 13.7115 = USD 1}	"El Teletón lo haces tú"	"You make Teletón"	To build and equip the fourteenth and fifteenth CRITs in Durango and Poza Rica, Veracruz; To create a specialty in rehabilitation medicine and a physical and occupational therapy license at the ITESR (Instituto Teletón de Estudios Superiores en Rehabilitación); To upgrade the thirteen CIRTs with new technology; Ensure operating funds for the thirteen CRITs; Continue the FTAI
Teletón México 2009	December 4–5	$440,404,910	$443,341,815	+0.66%	$35,194,517^{MXN 12.5969 = USD 1}	"No Hay Imposibles"	"There's no impossibles."	To upgrade the first fifteen CRITs to allow children with cancer; To build and equip the sixteenth and seventeenth CRITs in Hermosillo, Sonora and La Paz, Baja California Sur; Ensure operating funds for the fifteen CRITs
Teletón México 2010	December 3–4	$445,268,576	$446,851,910	+0.03%	$36,229,865^{MXN 12.3338 = USD 1}	"Lo mejor de ti, hace grande Mexico"	"The best of you makes Mexico great"	To build and equip the eighteenth and nineteenth CRITs in Puebla and the Federal District; Ensure operating funds for the seventeen CRITs
Teletón México 2011	December 2–3	$446,851,911	$450,346,218	+5.5%	$32,944,127.139^{MXN 13.6700 = USD 1}	"Caminemos juntos"	"Lets walk together"	To build and equip the twentieth CRIT in Acapulco, Guerrero, the first Teleton Oncology Children's Hospital for children with cancer in Queretaro, and the first Teleton Autism Children's Rehabilitation Center for children with autism in Mexico State; Ensure operating funds for the nineteen CRITs; The last Teletón to broadcast in United States (Teletón USA was created the following year)
Teletón México 2012	December 7–8	$471,472,925	$472,556,170	+0.23%	$36,064,042	"Gracias a ti"	"Thanks to you"	To build the twenty-first CRIT in Michoacán and equip the Teleton Oncology Children's Hospital in Querétaro; Ensure operating funds for the twenty CRITs and the Teleton Autism Children's Rehabilitation Center
Teletón México 2013	December 6–7	$472,556,170	$473,794,379	+0.99%	$36,158,539	"Gente Extraordinaria"	"Extraordinary people"	Ensure operating funds for the 21 CRITs, the Teleton Oncology Children's Hospital, and the Teleton Autism Children's Rehabilitation Center
Teletón México 2014	December 5–6	$473,794,380	$474,143,221	+0.074%	$32,116,134	"Pasión por la vida"	"Passion for life"	To build and equip the twenty-second CIRT in Baja California; Ensure operating funds for the 21 CRITs, the Teleton Oncology Children's Hospital, and the Teleton Autism Children's Rehabilitation Center
Teletón México 2015	December 12	$474,143,211 (500,000 visits)	$327,267,551 (602,710 visits)	-30.97%	$19,116,776	"Ven, conoce y decide"	"Come, know and decide"	This will be the first year that Teletón will not raise money; Although the main reason of this year Teletón is visits, donations were also being accepted; At the end of the Teletón $327,267,551 MXN (US$17.8 million) were raised (down 69% from the previous year); Ensure operating funds for the 21 CRITs, the Teletón Oncology Children's Hospital, and the Teletón Autism Children's Rehabilitation Center
Teletón México 2016	December 10–11	$327,261,512 (602,711 visits)	$361,695,829	+10.51%	$17,790,798	"Ven, conoce y únete, tu donación es la solución"	"Come, know and join us, your donation is the solution"	The goal is similar to that of 2015, inviting people to come and visit existing CRITs; At the end of the Teletón $361,695,829 MXN was raised; Ensure operating funds for 18 of the 21 CRITs, the Teletón Oncology Children's Hospital, and the Teletón Autism Children's Rehabilitation Center; Ensure extra operating funds for the Durango, Quintana Roo, and Veracruz CRITs to prevent them from closing
Teletón México 2017–18	March 23–24	$361,695,830	$364,097,181	+0.65%	$19,627,880	"México de pie"	Mexico standing	The telethon was originally scheduled for the weekend of October 6, 2017, but it was postponed because of the earthquakes in Chiapas and Mexico City that occurred during the month of September. 10% of the total was donated to all families that were affected by the earthquakes.; Ensure extra operating funds for the Mexico State, Quintana Roo, and Veracruz CRITs; Last telethon to air over a two-day period
Teletón Mexico 2018	December 8	$364,097,182	$367,190,205	+0.84%	$18,132,849	"¿A ti que te gusta hacer?"	What do you like to do?	Ensure operating funds for all 21 CRITs and both ancillary facilities
Teletón Mexico 2019	December 14	$367,190,206	$374,250,109	+1.92%	$19,000,000	"¿A ti que te gusta hacer?"	What do you like to do?	Ensure operating funds for all 21 CRITs and both ancillary facilities
Teletón Mexico 2020	December 5					"Capacidad sin límites" "Nos mueves tú"'	"Unlimited capacity" "You move us"	*Special telethon to raise money for research of COVID-19.

== Sponsors ==
The Teletón production is supported by enterprises who also finance year-round expenses of the CRITs. There is only one sponsor for each product category.

The first broadcast had nine sponsors; by 2008 the number was 26. Some businesses which have participated are:

Sponsor	Industry	Years Participating
Nacional Monte de Piedad	Financial services (pawnbroking)	18
Banamex	Financial services (banking)	18
Fundación Telmex	Philanthropy	18
Farmacias del Ahorro	Pharmacy	15
Telcel	Mobile phone carrier	15
Office Depot	Retail (office supplies)	8
La Costeña	Food (preserves)	10
Alpura	Food (dairy products)	15
Hidrosina	Energy (gasoline)	11
Fundación Gigante; Fundación Soriana	Philanthropy	15
Fud	Food (cold cuts)	14
Mattel	Toys and games	12
Hewlett-Packard (HP)	Computer systems, peripherals, software, consulting, IT services	6
Metlife	Finance and insurance	10
Homex	Developer	5
Acros	Home appliances	3
Andrea	Catalog retailing (shoes)	3
La Europea	Retailing (wine and gourmet food)	2
Holanda	Ice cream	2
DHL	Air courier	2
Omnilife	Business group	1
Seguritech	Security systems	1
Schering-Plough	Pharmaceutical	1
Hoteles/Resorts Misión	Hospitality	1
José Cuervo	Distillery	1
Grupo Rotoplas	Water puritification technology	1
Domino's Pizza	Pizza delivery	3

== TeletónUSA ==
In 2012, Teletón, in cooperation with the Univision television network, created TeletónUSA, an American charity with the same aim to help sick, disabled, and mentally-challenged children in America's Hispanic communities. Its first telethon was broadcast December 14 and 15, 2012 on the Univision network, and was hosted by famed Univision personality Don Francisco, who has hosted the telethon in Chile (Which was the inspiration for telethon). The first edition of TeletónUSA took US$8,150,625 in pledges, exceeding its initial goal of US$7 million.

In November 2014 The CRIT opened its first location in the United States in San Antonio, Texas.
