= Bola de locos =

Mexican television series

- Genre: Sitcom
- Created by: Carlos Eduardo Rico
- Written by: Carlos Eduardo Rico; Rebecca Zuloaga; Armando Roal; Jesús Prado; Goyo Ortiz
- Directed by: Abril Mayett
- Composer: Anael Granado Careaga
- Country of origin: Mexico
- Original language: Spanish
- No. of seasons: 2
- No. of episodes: 24

Production
- Executive producer: Alexis Núñez
- Producer: Goyo Ortiz
- Editor: Efraín Flores Vázquez
- Production company: TelevisaUnivision

Original release
- Network: Las Estrellas
- Release: 13 May 2023 – 20 December 2024

Bola de locos is a Mexican sitcom television series created by Carlos Eduardo Rico. It premiered on Las Estrellas on 13 May 2023. The series stars Liliana Arriaga, Carlos Eduardo Rico, Hugo Alcántara, Violeta Isfel, Eduardo Manzano, Jessica Segura, Oswaldo Zárate, Bárbara Islas and Shiky. The second season premiered on 4 October 2024.

== Premise ==
The series follows a group of neighbors with extravagant personalities living in a Mexican barrio where celebrities frequently arrive due to different circumstances.

== Cast ==
=== Main ===
- Liliana Arriaga as La Chupitos
- Carlos Eduardo Rico as Jonathan Christian
- Hugo Alcántara as El Indio Brayan
- Violeta Isfel as Xiomara Feng shui
- Eduardo Manzano as El Sopas
- Jessica Segura as Jelipa Pérez "Yani Pex"
- Oswaldo Zárate as Pinga
- Bárbara Islas as Vitalina
- Shiky as La Shikys

=== Guest stars ===
==== Season 1 ====
- Michelle Vieth
- Latin Lover
- Mara Escalante as Doña Lucha
- Ben Zeng as El Chino
- Psycho Clown
- Chessman
- El Hijo del Vikingo
- Manelyk González
- Luis "El Potro" Caballero
- Marjorie de Sousa
- Sabine Moussier
- Poncho de Nigris
- Victoria Ruffo
- Maribel Guardia
- Carlos Bonavides
- Cynthia Klitbo
- Teo González
- Aleida Núñez
- Ricardo Fastlicht

==== Season 2 ====
- Gala Montes
- Araceli "Gomita" Ordaz
- Emmanuel Palomares
- Sian Chiong
- Sylvia Pasquel
- Mariana Ochoa
- Laura Flores
- Nicola Porcella
- Gabriel Soto
- Raquel Garza as Tere la secretaria
- Pablo Montero
- Adamari López
- René Strickler

== Production ==
The creation of the series began in 1998, when series creator Carlos Eduardo Rico and executive producer Alexis Núñez worked for the morning program Hoy. In an interview, producer Goyo Ortiz spoke about how the series was conceived:

"Alexis Núñez and Carlos Eduardo Rico created several characters that were left there for a while and we took up this idea 22 years ago, this is the second attempt."

Filming of the first season took place between October 2022 and March 2023.

== Episodes ==
Series	Episodes	Originally released	
Series	Episodes	First released	Last released
1	12	13 May 2023	23 December 2023
2	12	4 October 2024	20 December 2024

=== Season 1 (2023) ===
No. overall	No. in season	Title	Original release date
1	1	"Amigos y rivales"	13 May 2023
2	2	"Locos con Doña Lucha"	20 May 2023
3	3	"Luchadores en bola"	27 May 2023
4	4	"Ligando en la vecindad"	3 June 2023
5	5	"Lejos de la fama"	10 June 2023
6	6	"Atrevida despedida"	17 June 2023
7	7	"No tiren la vecindad"	24 June 2023
8	8	"Una manita de gato"	1 July 2023
9	9	"Estamos embrujadas"	25 November 2023
10	10	"El director chiflado"	2 December 2023
11	11	"Llegó Teo"	9 December 2023
12	12	"El que no enseña no vende"	23 December 2023

=== Season 2 (2024) ===
No. overall	No. in season	Title	Original release date
13	1	"Loca venganza"	4 October 2024
14	2	"Los reyes del barrio"	11 October 2024
15	3	"Vecinos locochones"	18 October 2024
16	4	"Qué loca madre"	25 October 2024
17	5	"Susto de locura"	1 November 2024
18	6	"Loca fanaticada"	8 November 2024
19	7	"Garrotazo de locura"	15 November 2024
20	8	"Una loca secretaria"	22 November 2024
21	9	"Que loca herencia"	29 November 2024
22	10	"Locos por un gato"	6 December 2024
23	11	"Locos vs gaseros"	13 December 2024
24	12	"Serenata de locura"	20 December 2024
