= La casa de los famosos México season 1 =

La casa de los famosos México
- Season 1
- Hosted by: Galilea Montijo; Diego de Erice; Odalys Ramírez
- No. of days: 71
- No. of houseguests: 14
- Winner: Wendy Guevara
- Runner-up: Nicola Porcella
- No. of episodes: 61

Release
- Original network: Las Estrellas; Canal 5
- Original release: 4 June – 13 August 2023

Season chronology
- Next → Season 2

The first season of the Mexican reality television series La casa de los famosos México premiered on 4 June 2023, with a live move-in on Las Estrellas. The show follows a group of celebrities who live together in a house while being constantly filmed with no communication with the outside world as they compete to win the grand prize of $4,000,000. The season is hosted by Galilea Montijo, Diego de Erice and Odalys Ramírez.

The season concluded on 13 August 2023, after 71 days of competition with Wendy Guevara being crowned the winner, and Nicola Porcella the runner-up.

== Twists ==
=== Dilemma ===
During the premiere, housemates were presented with a Dilemma which consisted of making choices before entering the house. The consequences of these choices only lasted throughout Week 1. Raquel had to choose between eating only beans and rice for a week or closing the communal showers for a week; she chose the former. Sofía and Ferka had to choose who between them would lose access to their luggage for a week; they chose that Ferka would lose her luggage. Apio and Nicola had to choose who between them would sleep on a yoga mat on the floor for a week; they chose that Nicola would sleep on the floor. Bárbara and Paul had to choose between exchanging their luggage for a week or the entire house having no toothpaste for a week; they chose the former. Marie Claire and Jorge had to choose between sleeping in a bed together for a week or the entire house having no coffee for a week; they chose the former. Sergio had to choose between having no underwear for a week or the entire house having no towels and bathrobes for a week; he chose the former. Wendy and Poncho had to choose between sleeping in a bed together for a week or both of them not being able to attend the first week's party; they chose the latter. Emilio had to choose between sleeping outside for the first three nights or removing access to hot water from the other housemates for the first three days; he chose the latter.

On Day 9, the new housemate Barby was presented with her own Dilemma. She had to choose between keeping on her boxing gloves for the next three days or cutting off power to the laundry room for those three days; she chose the latter.

=== Flash Vote ===
During the season premiere, there was a Flash Vote whereby the public was given the opportunity to nominate one housemate to be up for eviction that week. The public had only a few minutes to vote for who they wanted to nominate. The housemate who received the most votes was nominated that week.

== Housemates ==
On Day 1, thirteen celebrity housemates (Apio, Bárbara, Emilio, Ferka, Jorge, Marie Claire, Nicola, Paul, Poncho, Raquel, Sergio, Sofía & Wendy) moved into the house. The official fourteenth housemate would move into the house at a later date. On Day 9, this housemate was revealed to be Barby.

Name	Age	Occupation	Day entered	Result	Ref
Wendy Guevara	29	Influencer	1	Winner; Day 71	
Nicola Porcella	35	TV Host	1	Runner-up; Day 71	
Alfonso "Poncho" de Nigris	46	Influencer and entrepreneur	1	3rd Place; Day 71	
Sergio Mayer	57	Actor and politician	1	4th Place; Day 71	
Emilio Osorio	20	Singer and actor	1	5th Place; Day 69	
Mariana "Barby" Juárez	43	Professional boxer	9	Evicted; Day 64	
Jorge Losa	33	Actor	1	Evicted; Day 57	
Apio Quijano	46	Singer	1	Evicted; Day 50	
Bárbara Torres	52	Actress and comedian	1	Evicted; Day 43	
Paul Stanley	37	Actor and host	1	Evicted; Day 36	
Raquel Bigorra	48	Actress	1	Evicted; Day 29	
María "Ferka" Fernanda Quiroz	36	Actress	1	Evicted; Day 22	
Sofia Rivera Torres	30	Actress and TV/Radio Host	1	Evicted; Day 15	
Marie Claire Harp	30	Model and businesswoman	1	Evicted; Day 8	

== Nominations table ==
Every week, each participant has to nominate two of their housemates, with the exception of the Head of Household who has immunity and could not be nominated; there is also no need to nominate the public Flash Vote nominee. The first person a housemate nominates is for 2 points, and the second nomination is for 1 point. At least four participants who had the highest amount of nomination points are nominated for eviction. The public is then able to vote online for who they want to save from eviction. The housemate who receives the least public votes is evicted that week.

This housemate was the Head of Household, and could not be nominated.
This housemate was nominated by their housemates.
This housemate was nominated by the public.
This housemate was immune from eviction.

	Week 1	Week 2	Week 3	Week 4	Week 5	Week 6	Week 7	Week 8	Week 9	Week 10		
	Week 1	Week 2	Week 3	Week 4	Week 5	Week 6	Week 7	Week 8	Week 9	Day 69	Finale	
Wendy	Jorge; Ferka	Sofía; Ferka	Ferka; Jorge	Barby; Raquel	Barby; Paul	Jorge; Bárbara	Apio; Barby; Nicola	Jorge; Barby; Poncho	Barby; Poncho; Sergio	No; Nominations	Winner (Day 71)	
Nicola	Jorge; Marie Claire	Sofía; Paul	Raquel; Jorge	Barby; Paul	Barby; Paul	Jorge; Bárbara	Apio; Barby; Sergio	Jorge; Poncho; Barby	Barby; Emilio; Wendy	No; Nominations	Runner-up (Day 71)	
Poncho	Marie Claire; Jorge	Sofía; Ferka	~~Jorge~~; Ferka	Paul; Barby	Paul; Barby	Jorge; Bárbara	Apio; Barby; Nicola	Jorge; Barby; Sergio	Barby; Emilio; Wendy	No; Nominations	Third place (Day 71)	
Sergio	Jorge; Nicola	Sofía; Ferka	~~Jorge~~; Ferka	Paul; Barby	Paul; Barby	Jorge; Bárbara	Apio; Nicola; Barby	Jorge; Poncho; Barby	Barby; Poncho; Emilio	No; Nominations	Fourth place (Day 71)	
Emilio	Raquel; Marie Claire	Ferka; Raquel	Ferka; Raquel	Raquel; Barby	Barby; Paul	Jorge; Bárbara	Apio; Nicola; Barby	Barby; Jorge; Poncho	Barby; Poncho; Wendy	No; Nominations	Fifth place (Day 69)	
Barby	Not in House	Exempt	Nicola; Bárbara	Sergio; Nicola	Sergio; Emilio	Wendy; Emilio	Sergio; Emilio; Apio	Poncho; Sergio; Nicola	Poncho; Emilio; Sergio	Evicted (Day 64)		
Jorge	Sergio; Sofía	Sergio; Poncho	Nicola; Sergio	Sergio; Nicola	Sergio; Apio	Poncho; Sergio	Poncho; Emilio; Sergio	Sergio; Poncho; Wendy	Evicted (Day 57)			
Apio	Nicola; Jorge	Raquel; Bárbara	Bárbara; Raquel	Barby; Raquel	Barby; Paul	Jorge; Bárbara	Nicola; Sergio; Barby	Evicted (Day 50)				
Bárbara	Sergio; Nicola	Nicola; Apio	Raquel; Barby	Raquel; Apio	Emilio; Nicola	Jorge; Apio	Evicted (Day 43)					
Paul	Nicola; Raquel	Sergio; Ferka	~~Nicola~~; ~~Sergio~~	Sergio; Poncho	Sergio; Apio	Evicted (Day 36)						
Raquel	Marie Claire; Emilio	Sergio; Poncho	Poncho; Nicola	Apio; Sergio	Evicted (Day 29)							
Ferka	Sergio; Marie Claire	Sergio; Poncho	~~Nicola~~; ~~Sergio~~	Evicted (Day 22)								
Sofía	Jorge; Nicola	Poncho; Sergio	Evicted (Day 15)									
Marie Claire	Nicola; Raquel	Evicted (Day 8)										
Notes	1	2	3, 4	none		5	6	6, 7	8, 9	none		
Head of Household	Apio	Jorge	Apio; Emilio	Jorge	Jorge	Barby	Jorge	Emilio	None			
Nominations (pre-save)	Jorge (10); Nicola (9); Marie Claire (7); Sergio (6); Poncho (FV)	Sergio (9); Sofía (8); Ferka (6); Poncho (5)	Ferka (6); Raquel (6); Nicola (5); Bárbara (3)	Barby (9); Sergio (7); Raquel (6); Paul (5)	Barby (10); Paul (8); Sergio (6); Emilio (3)	Jorge (15); Bárbara (7); Poncho (2); Wendy (2)	Apio (16); Barby (9); Nicola (9); Sergio (7)	Poncho (16); Barby (13); Sergio (6); Jorge (5)	Barby (6); Poncho (3); Wendy (2)	None		
Saved by HoH	Poncho	Ferka	Nicola	Barby	Barby	Jorge	Barby	Barby	None			
Against public vote	Jorge; Nicola; Marie Claire; Sergio	Sergio; Sofía; Poncho	Ferka; Raquel; Bárbara	Sergio; Raquel; Paul	Paul; Sergio; Emilio	Bárbara; Poncho; Wendy	Apio; Nicola; Sergio	Poncho; Sergio; Jorge	Barby; Poncho; Wendy	Emilio; Nicola; Poncho; Sergio; Wendy	Nicola; Poncho; Sergio; Wendy	
Evicted	Marie Claire; Fewest votes to save	Sofía; Fewest votes to save	Ferka; Fewest votes to save	Raquel; Fewest votes to save	Paul; Fewest votes to save	Bárbara; Fewest votes to save	Apio; Fewest votes to save	Jorge; Fewest votes to save	Barby; Fewest votes to save	Emilio; Fewest votes to win	Sergio; Fewest votes to win	Poncho; Fewest votes to win
Evicted	Marie Claire; Fewest votes to save	Sofía; Fewest votes to save	Ferka; Fewest votes to save	Raquel; Fewest votes to save	Paul; Fewest votes to save	Bárbara; Fewest votes to save	Apio; Fewest votes to save	Jorge; Fewest votes to save	Barby; Fewest votes to save	Emilio; Fewest votes to win	Nicola; Fewest votes to win	
Saved	Jorge; Nicola; Sergio; Most votes to save	Sergio; Poncho; Most votes to save	Raquel; Bárbara; Most votes to save	Sergio; Paul; Most votes to save	Sergio; Emilio; Most votes to save	Poncho; Wendy; Most votes to save	Nicola; Sergio; Most votes to save	Poncho; Sergio; Most votes to save	Poncho; Wendy; Most votes to save	Nicola; Poncho; Sergio; Wendy; Most votes to win	Wendy; 44.9% to win	

- ^Note 1: On Day 1, Poncho received the most public votes from the Flash Vote, but was saved by the HoH.
- ^Note 2: On Day 9, Barby entered the house as a new housemate. She was immune from eviction and was not eligible to nominate that week.
- ^Note 3: The HoH competition was played in teams of two. Apio and Emilio won the competition and both became Heads of Household. Both had to come to an agreement on which of the nominees to save that week.
- ^Note 4: Due to announcing their intentions on who to nominate to other housemates, Ferka and Paul's points against Nicola and Sergio were annulled; Poncho and Sergio's points against Jorge were annulled.
- ^Note 5: On Day 33, Emilio won the power of adding 1 nomination point to his nominations. Therefore, the first housemate he nominates is for 3 points and the second nomination is for 2 points.
- ^Note 6: This week, each housemate was given an extra nomination. Therefore, the first housemate they nominate is for 3 points, the second nomination is for 2 points, and the third nomination is for 1 point.
- ^Note 7: On Day 47, Nicola won the power to spin a wheel that determined the amount of points given to his nominations. The results were -6 points to Jorge, 6 points to Poncho, and 5 points to Barby.
- ^Note 8: Nicola won the final competition, winning immunity from the final eviction and granting him a place in the finale.
- ^Note 9: This week, the three participants who had the highest amount of nomination points are nominated for eviction. The housemates also had to spin a wheel that determined the amount of points given to their nominations. The results were:
  - Nicola: 1 point to Barby, -2 points to Emilio, and 2 points to Wendy.
  - Sergio: 3 points to Barby, 1 point to Poncho, and -3 points to Emilio.
  - Emilio: 2 points to Barby, -2 points to Poncho, and -2 points to Wendy.
  - Barby: 1 point to Poncho, 1 point to Emilio, and 3 points to Sergio.
  - Wendy: 3 points to Barby, 3 points to Poncho, and -2 points to Sergio.
  - Poncho: -3 points to Barby, -2 points to Emilio, and 2 points to Wendy.

== Total received nominations ==
	Week 1	Week 2	Week 3	Week 4	Week 5	Week 6	Week 7	Week 8	Week 9	Week 10 Final	Total
Wendy	0	0	0	0	0	2	0	1	2	Winner	5
Nicola	9	2	5	2	1	0	9	1	0	Runner-up	29
Poncho	0	5	2	1	0	2	3	15	3	3rd Place	31
Sergio	6	9	1	7	6	1	7	6	1	4th Place	44
Emilio	1	0	0	0	3	1	4	0	-6	5th Place	9
Barby	Not in House	0	1	9	10	0	9	13	6	Evicted	48
Jorge	10	0	2	0	0	15	0	5	Evicted		32
Apio	0	1	0	3	2	1	16	Evicted			23
Bárbara	0	1	3	0	0	7	Evicted				11
Paul	0	1	0	5	8	Evicted					14
Raquel	4	3	6	6	Evicted						19
Ferka	1	6	6	Evicted							13
Sofía	1	8	Evicted								9
Marie Claire	7	Evicted									7

== Episodes ==
No. overall	No. in season	Title	Original release date	Mexico viewers (millions)
Week 1
1	1	"Gala de apertura"	4 June 2023	3.80
2	2	"Gala prueba del líder"	5 June 2023	0.93
3	3	"Gala prueba semanal"	6 June 2023	0.86
4	4	"Gala nominaciones"	7 June 2023	1.10
5	5	"Gala salvación"	8 June 2023	1.10
6	6	"Gala debate y fiesta"	9 June 2023	0.98
7	7	"Gala de eliminación"	11 June 2023	2.40
Week 2
8	8	"Gala prueba del líder"	12 June 2023	1.20
9	9	"Gala prueba semanal"	13 June 2023	1.10
10	10	"Gala nominaciones"	14 June 2023	1.40
11	11	"Gala salvación"	15 June 2023	1.20
12	12	"Gala debate y fiesta"	16 June 2023	1.30
13	13	"Gala de eliminación"	18 June 2023	2.10
Week 3
14	14	"Gala prueba del líder"	19 June 2023	1.30
15	15	"Gala prueba semanal"	20 June 2023	1.50
16	16	"Gala nominaciones"	21 June 2023	1.70
17	17	"Gala salvación"	22 June 2023	1.80
18	18	"Gala debate y fiesta"	23 June 2023	1.30
19	19	"Gala de eliminación"	25 June 2023	2.80
Week 4
20	20	"Gala prueba del líder"	26 June 2023	1.40
21	21	"Gala prueba semanal"	27 June 2023	1.10
22	22	"Gala nominaciones"	28 June 2023	1.80
23	23	"Gala salvación"	29 June 2023	1.80
24	24	"Gala debate y fiesta"	30 June 2023	1.60
25	25	"Gala de eliminación"	2 July 2023	2.70
Week 5
26	26	"Gala prueba del líder"	3 July 2023	1.70
27	27	"Gala prueba semanal"	4 July 2023	1.60
28	28	"Gala nominaciones"	5 July 2023	1.90
29	29	"Gala salvación"	6 July 2023	1.80
30	30	"Gala debate y fiesta"	7 July 2023	1.60
31	31	"Gala de eliminación"	9 July 2023	3.40
Week 6
32	32	"Gala prueba del líder"	10 July 2023	1.70
33	33	"Gala prueba semanal"	11 July 2023	1.90
34	34	"Gala nominaciones"	12 July 2023	2.10
35	35	"Gala salvación"	13 July 2023	2.20
36	36	"Gala debate y fiesta"	14 July 2023	1.90
37	37	"Gala de eliminación"	16 July 2023	3.50
Week 7
38	38	"Gala prueba del líder"	17 July 2023	2.10
39	39	"Gala prueba semanal"	18 July 2023	1.80
40	40	"Gala nominaciones"	19 July 2023	2.60
41	41	"Gala salvación"	20 July 2023	2.30
42	42	"Gala debate y fiesta"	21 July 2023	2.00
43	43	"Gala de eliminación"	23 July 2023	3.50
Week 8
44	44	"Gala prueba del líder"	24 July 2023	2.30
45	45	"Gala prueba semanal"	25 July 2023	2.10
46	46	"Gala nominaciones"	26 July 2023	2.40
47	47	"Gala salvación"	27 July 2023	2.50
48	48	"Gala debate y fiesta"	28 July 2023	1.80
49	49	"Gala de eliminación"	30 July 2023	3.70
Week 9
50	50	"Gala prueba del líder"	31 July 2023	2.70
51	51	"Gala prueba semanal"	1 August 2023	2.20
52	52	"Gala nominaciones"	2 August 2023	2.60
53	53	"Gala del 3 de agosto, 2023"	3 August 2023	2.40
54	54	"Gala debate y fiesta"	4 August 2023	2.10
55	55	"Gala de eliminación"	6 August 2023	3.50
Week 10
56	56	"Gala del 7 de agosto, 2023"	7 August 2023	2.20
57	57	"Gala del 8 de agosto, 2023"	8 August 2023	2.20
58	58	"Gala del 9 de agosto, 2023"	9 August 2023	2.20
59	59	"Gala del 10 de agosto, 2023"	10 August 2023	2.20
60	60	"Gala de eliminación"	11 August 2023	2.80
61	61	"Gala de clausura"	13 August 2023	5.10
