= La casa de los famosos México season 4 =

La casa de los famosos México
- Season 4
- Hosted by: Galilea Montijo; Diego de Erice; Odalys Ramírez
- No. of days: 71
- No. of housemates: 19
- Winner: Mariana Ochoa
- Runner-up: Memo Schutz
- No. of episodes: 61

Release
- Original network: Las Estrellas; Canal 5
- Original release: 26 July – 4 October 2026

Season chronology
- ← Previous; Season 3

The fourth season of the Mexican reality television series La casa de los famosos México premiered on 26 July 2026, with a live move-in on Las Estrellas. The show follows a group of celebrities who live together in a house while being constantly filmed with no communication with the outside world as they compete to win the cash grand prize.

The season was announced on 6 October 2025. Galilea Montijo, Diego de Erice and Odalys Ramírez returned as co-hosts of the series.

The season concluded on 4 October 2026, after 71 days of competition with Mariana Ochoa being crowned the winner, and Memo Schutz the runner-up.

== Format ==
The season follows a group of celebrities living in a house together with no communication with the outside world while being constantly filmed during their time in the house. During their stay, the housemates share their thoughts on events of the house and reveal their nomination points as well inside a private room referred to as the Confesionario (Confession Room). Additionally, each week the housemates are assigned tasks in order to win their allowance for food.

=== Twists ===
==== The Exile ====
On Day 15, Mariana and Ximena were sent to The Exile, a cabin outside the main house with minimal amenities, for a chance to return to the game. The public voted for which housemate they wanted to see return to the house. On Day 17, Mariana re-entered the competition.

On Day 30, Luis, Yanet and Ese were sent to The Exile after being voted by the public as furniture, housemates who contribute the least to the house dynamics and are the most irrelevant to the game. On Day 31, the housemates voted to save them from eviction. Yanet received the fewest votes and was evicted from the house.

==== Nominations ====
Starting in Week 4, the Head of Household is allowed to automatically nominate a housemate of their choice.

==== Agreement Room ====
In Week 6, the Agreement Room was introduced. Five housemates are chosen to enter the room and participate in an auction for immunity, bidding using the weekly shopping budget. If the participants choose not to bid for immunity, one of them is automatically nominated for eviction.

== Housemates ==
Fifteen housemates were revealed from 6 to 21 July 2026. Gema Garoa, Luis Chaparro and Mariana Ochoa were revealed during the move-in premiere. Additionally, during the premiere, Fede Vigevani was revealed to be a fake housemate that would infiltrate the house to complete secret missions for the public. He can compete in the Head of Household and Power to Save competitions; however, he is ineligible to nominate and is immune from eviction, with any nomination points against him being annulled. He left the house on Day 17. Season 2 housemate Gala Montes entered the competition on Day 43.

Name	Age	Occupation	Day entered	Result	Ref
Mariana Ochoa	47	Singer and actress	17	Winner; Day 71	
Mariana Ochoa	47	Singer and actress	1	Evicted; Day 8	
Memo Schutz	46	Sportscaster	1	Runner-up; Day 71	
Karina Torres	35	Influencer	1	3rd Place; Day 71	
Ese Pérez	26	Influencer	1	4th Place; Day 71	
Gema Garoa	36	Actress	1	5th Place; Day 71	
Yahir Othón	47	Singer and actor	1	6th Place; Day 68	
Ernesto Laguardia	66	Actor	1	7th Place; Day 67	
Brianda Deyanara	30	Influencer	1	Evicted; Day 64	
Cynthia Klitbo	59	Actress	1	Evicted; Day 57	
Masad Al-Tamimi	36	Influencer	1	Evicted; Day 50	
Gala Montes	26	Actress	43	Walked; Day 45	
Flor Vigna	32	TV personality and singer	1	Evicted; Day 43	
Aldo Rendón	47	Fashion stylist	1	Walked; Day 38	
Luis Chaparro	29	Influencer	1	Evicted; Day 36	
Yanet García	35	Influencer	1	Evicted; Day 31	
Moisés Peñaloza	34	Actor	1	Evicted; Day 29	
Arantza Ruiz	29	Actress	1	Evicted; Day 22	
Ximena Herrera	46	Actress	1	Evicted; Day 15	

=== Fake Housemate ===
Name	Age	Occupation	Day entered	Day exited	Ref
Fede Vigevani	31	YouTuber	1	17	

== Nominations table ==
Every week, each participant nominates three of their housemates, with the exception of the Head of Household who has immunity and cannot be nominated. The first person a housemate nominates is for 3 points, the second nomination is for 2 points, and the third nomination is for 1 point. At least five participants who had the highest amount of nomination points are nominated for eviction. The public is then able to vote online for who they want to save from eviction. The housemate who receives the least public votes is evicted that week.

This housemate was the Head of Household, and could not be nominated.
This housemate was nominated by their housemates.
This housemate was saved from eviction by the Power to Save holder.
This housemate was automatically put up for eviction.
This housemate was immune from eviction.

	Week 1	Week 2	Week 3	Week 4	Week 5		Week 6	Week 7	Week 8	Week 9	Week 10			
	Week 1	Week 2	Week 3	Week 4	Day 31	Day 36	Week 6	Week 7	Week 8	Week 9	Day 67	Day 68	Finale	
Mariana	Yanet; Arantza	Evicted (Day 8)	Exempt	Aldo; Flor; Moisés	Ese	Not eligible	Yahir; Gema; Flor	Gema; Karina; Brianda	Brianda; Memo; Ernesto	Yahir; Karina; Brianda	No nominations	No nominations	Winner (Day 71)	
Memo	Yanet; Ese	Ximena; Yahir; Ese	Moisés; Masad; Ese	~~Moisés~~; ~~Flor~~; ~~Ese~~	Ese	Aldo	Flor; Ernesto; Gema	Masad; Ernesto; Karina	Ernesto; Mariana; Brianda	Yahir; Karina; Brianda	No nominations	No nominations	Runner-up (Day 71)	
Karina	Luis; Flor	Ximena; ~~Fede~~; Yanet	Yanet; Luis; Cynthia	Masad; Cynthia; Moisés; Ernesto; Yahir; Brianda	Ese	Cynthia; Ese; Yahir	Memo; Cynthia; Ernesto	Masad; Yahir; Ernesto	Mariana; Yahir; Memo	Ese; Gema; Memo	No nominations	No nominations	Third place (Day 71)	
Ese	Memo; Masad	Masad; Flor; Arantza	Moisés; Masad; Arantza	Cynthia; Yahir; Ernesto; Masad	Nominated	Karina	Brianda; Cynthia; Yahir	Masad; Brianda; Yahir	Mariana; Yahir; Cynthia	Gema; Karina; Ernesto	No nominations	No nominations	Fourth place (Day 71)	
Gema	Ximena; Memo	Memo; Ximena; Masad	Luis; Yanet; Ernesto	Brianda; Masad; Yahir	Ese	Mariana; Karina; Ernesto	Cynthia; Brianda; Ernesto	Brianda; Masad; Yahir	Ernesto; Mariana; Cynthia	Ese; Karina; Yahir	No nominations	No nominations	Fifth place (Day 71)	
Yahir	Brianda; Arantza	Luis; Brianda; Arantza	Moisés; Luis; Flor	Ernesto; Ese; Memo	Yanet	Memo; Luis	Karina; Gema; Flor	Cynthia; Gema; Karina	Ernesto; Karina; Mariana	Ernesto; Karina; Memo	No nominations	No nominations	Sixth place (Day 68)	
Ernesto	Yanet; Arantza	Ximena; Yanet; Arantza	Moisés; Masad; Flor	Flor; Memo; Yanet; Masad	Luis	Mariana; Ese; Brianda	Flor; Karina; ~~Gema~~	Karina; Yahir; Gema; Memo	Memo; Yahir; Karina	Brianda; Karina; Yahir	No nominations	Seventh place (Day 67)		
Brianda	Mariana; Gema	Cynthia; Ernesto; Gema	Moisés; Flor; Yahir	~~Cynthia~~; ~~Moisés~~; ~~Ese~~; Ernesto; Yahir; Karina	Yanet	Not eligible	Cynthia; Karina; ~~Flor~~	Ernesto; Gema; Cynthia	Cynthia; Ernesto; Mariana	Memo; Yahir; Karina	Evicted (Day 64)			
Cynthia	Yanet; Ximena	~~Fede~~; Aldo; Flor	Flor; Aldo; Ese	Ese; Aldo; ~~Karina~~	Luis	Mariana; Karina	Yahir; Flor; Karina	Karina; Masad; Brianda	Ernesto; Brianda; Mariana	Evicted (Day 57)				
Masad	Yanet; Luis	Memo; Luis; Ese	Memo; Moisés; Arantza	~~Moisés~~; Ese; Ernesto	Luis	Brianda	Cynthia; Karina; ~~Gema~~	Karina; Memo; Gema	Evicted (Day 50)					
Gala	Not in House							Walked (Day 45)						
Flor	Mariana; Yanet	Ximena; Memo; Yanet	Luis; Moisés; Masad	Yanet; Ernesto; Memo	Ese	Mariana; Ernesto; Cynthia	Ernesto; Brianda; Memo	Evicted (Day 43)						
Aldo	Arantza; Yanet	Ximena; Flor; Memo	~~Flor~~; ~~Arantza~~; ~~Moisés~~	Cynthia; Ernesto; Moisés	Ese	Not eligible	Walked (Day 38)							
Luis	Yanet; Masad	Masad; Yahir; Gema	Yahir; Moisés; Flor	Yahir; Ese; ~~Karina~~; Moisés	Nominated	Mariana	Evicted (Day 36)							
Yanet	Arantza; Mariana	Gema; Ernesto; Cynthia	Cynthia; Moisés; Flor; Ernesto	Karina; Moisés; Ernesto	Nominated	Evicted (Day 31)								
Moisés	Yanet; Ximena	Ernesto; Ese; Masad	Arantza; Memo; Flor	~~Yahir~~; ~~Ese~~; ~~Ernesto~~; Brianda; Flor; Aldo	Evicted (Day 29)									
Arantza	Mariana; Ximena	Masad; Yanet; Ximena	Moisés; Ese; Karina	Evicted (Day 22)										
Ximena	Moisés; Arantza	Gema; Cynthia; Ernesto	Evicted (Day 15)											
Fake Housemate
Fede	Head of Household	Not eligible	Left (Day 17)											
Notes	1, 2, 3	none	4, 3, 5	6	7, 8		9, 10, 11, 12	13, 14, 15	16, 17	18, 19, 20	none			
Head of Household	Fede	Moisés	Brianda	Gema	Masad		Masad	Brianda	Mariana	None				
Nominations (pre-save)	Aldo; Yanet (16); Mariana (9); Arantza (8); Ximena (5); Luis (3); Memo (3)	Ximena (18); Masad (11); Memo (9); Ernesto (8); Gema (8)	Moisés (27); Flor (11); Luis (10); Masad (7); Arantza (5); Memo (5); Yanet (5)	Mariana (HoH); Ernesto (18); Cynthia (12); Ese (10); Yahir (10); Brianda (7); Flor (7); Masad (7); Moisés (7)	Ese; Luis; Yanet	Gema (HoH); Mariana (6); Ernesto (3); Brianda (1); Karina (1); Luis (1)	Ese (HoH); Gema (12); Flor (4); Memo (4); Yahir (4); Cynthia (3)	Mariana (HoH); Karina (13); Masad (13); Gema (10); Brianda (7); Yahir (7)	Ese (HoH); Ernesto (5); Cynthia (4); Karina (1); Memo (1); Mariana (-2)	Ese (6); Brianda (5); Gema (5); Memo (5); Ernesto (4)	None			
Power to Save Holder	Arantza	Moisés	Moisés	Brianda	None	Brianda	Masad	Yahir	Mariana	Gema	None			
Saved	Arantza	Gema	Moisés	Brianda	None	Brianda	Yahir	Yahir	Mariana	Gema	None			
Against public vote	Aldo; Yanet; Mariana; Ximena; Luis; Memo	Ximena; Masad; Memo; Ernesto	Flor; Luis; Masad; Arantza; Memo; Yanet	Mariana; Ernesto; Cynthia; Ese; Yahir; Flor; Masad; Moisés	None	Gema; Mariana; Ernesto; Karina; Luis	Ese; Gema; Flor; Memo; Cynthia	Mariana; Karina; Masad; Gema; Brianda	Ese; Ernesto; Cynthia; Karina; Memo	Ese; Brianda; Memo; Ernesto	Ernesto; Ese; Gema; Karina; Mariana; Memo; Yahir	Ese; Gema; Karina; Mariana; Memo; Yahir	Ese; Gema; Karina; Mariana; Memo	
Walked	None						Aldo	Gala	None					
Evicted	Mariana; Fewest votes to save	Ximena; Fewest votes to save	Arantza; Fewest votes to save	Moisés; Fewest votes to save	Yanet; 2 of 11 votes to save	Luis; Fewest votes to save	Flor; Fewest votes to save	Masad; Fewest votes to save	Cynthia; Fewest votes to save	Brianda; Fewest votes to save	Ernesto; 1,080,024 votes to win	Yahir; 3,844,422 votes to win	Gema; 6,155,147 votes to win	Ese; 6,618,224 votes to win
Evicted	Mariana; Fewest votes to save	Ximena; Fewest votes to save	Arantza; Fewest votes to save	Moisés; Fewest votes to save	Yanet; 2 of 11 votes to save	Luis; Fewest votes to save	Flor; Fewest votes to save	Masad; Fewest votes to save	Cynthia; Fewest votes to save	Brianda; Fewest votes to save	Ernesto; 1,080,024 votes to win	Yahir; 3,844,422 votes to win	Karina; 9,718,852 votes to win	Memo; 9,834,525 votes to win
Evicted	Mariana; Fewest votes to save	Ximena; Fewest votes to save	Arantza; Fewest votes to save	Moisés; Fewest votes to save	Yanet; 2 of 11 votes to save	Luis; Fewest votes to save	Flor; Fewest votes to save	Masad; Fewest votes to save	Cynthia; Fewest votes to save	Brianda; Fewest votes to save	Ernesto; 1,080,024 votes to win	Yahir; 3,844,422 votes to win	Mariana; 10,825,542 votes to win	

- ^Note 1: On Day 1, Arantza answered the orange phone and nominated Aldo for eviction, while Gema answered the phone and gave Cynthia immunity for the week.
- ^Note 2: On Day 3, Brianda won a Coin of Destiny, whose power was chosen in a public vote. The winning power was duplicating her nomination points, giving 4 points to Mariana and 2 points to Gema.
- ^Note 3: In Week 1, each housemate had three nomination points to give to two housemates, the first receiving 2 points and the second receiving 1 point.
- ^Note 4: On Day 17, Mariana re-entered the house via public vote. She was immune from eviction and was ineligible to nominate.
- ^Note 5: On Day 18, Yanet won the power of nominating a fourth housemate with 3 points; she nominated Cynthia. Additionally, Arantza won the power of voiding the nominations of any housemate; she voided Aldo's nominations.
- ^Note 6: In Week 4, each housemate randomly chose a piggy bank that contained within it an advantage or disadvantage that affected nominations.
  - Aldo duplicated his nomination points, giving 6 points to Cynthia, 4 points to Ernesto and 2 points to Moisés
  - Brianda's initial nominations were voided and she had to nominate three other housemates instead.
  - Cynthia's point against Karina was voided.
  - Ernesto nominated Masad with a point in front of the house.
  - Ese was given 2 nomination points to use on a housemate from the Malibu bedroom; he nominated Ernesto.
  - Flor witnessed Yanet's nominations and shared them with the entire house.
  - Gema picked Karina to nominate a second time. Karina nominated Cynthia with 3 points, Ernesto with 2 points and Brianda with a point.
  - Karina and Yahir's nominations were not affected.
  - Luis' 2 points against Karina were voided. Additionally, his Coin of Destiny reward was a bonus piggy bank, which gave him the power to nominate a fourth housemate with 3 points in front of the house; he nominated Ese.
  - Mariana was able to witness the nominations of the next housemate, which was Aldo.
  - Masad's 3 points against Moisés were voided.
  - Memo's nominations were voided.
  - Moisés' initial nominations were voided and he had to nominate three other housemates instead.
  - Yanet picked Karina to share her nominations with the house.
- ^Note 7: On Day 30, Ese, Luis and Yanet were chosen by the public as furniture of the house. As part of the punishment, they were automatically nominated for eviction and the housemates voted to save them on Day 31.
- ^Note 8: In Week 5, the housemates had 30 seconds to search in a ball pit for up to three balls that would indicate whether they would nominate with positive or negative points. The results were:
  - Aldo, Brianda and Mariana were unable to find a ball and could not nominate.
  - Cynthia: -1 to Mariana, +3 to Karina
  - Ernesto: -1 to Mariana, -1 to Ese, +2 to Brianda
  - Ese: -1 to Karina
  - Flor: +3 to Mariana, +2 to Ernesto, +1 to Cynthia
  - Gema: +3 to Mariana, -1 to Karina, +1 to Ernesto
  - Karina: -1 to Cynthia, -2 to Ese, -1 to Yahir
  - Luis: +2 to Mariana
  - Masad: -1 to Brianda
  - Memo: -2 to Aldo
  - Yahir: -3 to Memo, +1 to Luis
- ^Note 9: On Day 37, Mariana received immunity after winning the auction in the Agreement Room.
- ^Note 10: On Day 38, Cynthia entered the Temptation Booth and was offered the opportunity to speak with a family member in exchange for nominating either Ernesto, Gema, Memo or Yahir with 3 points. She nominated Yahir.
- ^Note 11: On Day 38, Aldo walked from the game for health reasons.
- ^Note 12: In Week 6, each housemate picked three chips with the faces of the housemates they wanted to nominate and dropped them down a pegboard. The bottom of the board was divided into 8 slots marked with negative or positive points. If a chip fell into a space already occupied, then that nomination would be invalid. The results were:
  - Brianda: -3 to Cynthia, 0 to Karina
  - Cynthia: +3 to Flor, -2 to Karina, +1 to Yahir
  - Ernesto: +2 to Flor, -2 to Karina
  - Ese: -2 to Brianda, +3 to Cynthia, +2 to Yahir
  - Flor: -4 to Ernesto, +2 to Brianda, +4 to Memo
  - Gema: +1 to Cynthia, -3 to Brianda, +4 to Ernesto
  - Karina: 0 to Memo, +4 to Cynthia, -4 to Ernesto
  - Mariana: -2 to Yahir, +4 to Gema, +2 to Flor
  - Masad: -2 to Cynthia, +4 to Karina
  - Memo: 0 to Flor, -4 to Ernesto, +4 to Gema
  - Yahir: -2 to Karina, +4 to Gema, -3 to Flor
- ^Note 13: On Day 43, Gala entered the house as a new housemate. She was immune from eviction and was ineligible to nominate; however, she walked from the house on Day 45 for personal reasons.
- ^Note 14: On Day 44, Brianda won the Head of Household competition; however, her immunity was put up for auction in the Agreement Room. Ese won the auction and was immune from eviction.
- ^Note 15: On Day 45, Ernesto entered the Temptation Booth and was offered the opportunity to speak with a family member in exchange for nominating a housemate with 3 points. He nominated Karina.
- ^Note 16: On Day 51, Mariana won the Head of Household competition; however, her immunity was put up for auction in the Agreement Room. Gema won the auction and was immune from eviction.
- ^Note 17: In Week 8, each housemate picked a safe that would indicate if they would use a roulette wheel, cards, or dice to determine their nomination points. The results were:
  - Brianda: -1 to Cynthia, +3 to Ernesto, +2 to Mariana
  - Cynthia: -1 to Ernesto, -3 to Brianda, -2 to Mariana
  - Ernesto: +2 to Memo, +1 to Yahir, -1 to Karina
  - Ese: +3 to Mariana, -3 to Yahir, +2 to Cynthia
  - Gema: +1 to Ernesto, -1 to Mariana, +3 to Cynthia
  - Karina: -3 to Mariana, -3 to Yahir, -2 to Memo
  - Mariana: -2 to Brianda, +1 to Memo, -2 to Ernesto
  - Memo: +2 to Ernesto, 0 to Mariana, 0 to Brianda
  - Yahir: +2 to Ernesto, +2 to Karina, -1 to Mariana
- ^Note 18: On Day 58, Mariana won the final competition, winning immunity from the final eviction and granting her a place in the final week.
- ^Note 19: In Week 9, the housemates voted for who they wanted to save from nomination. The five housemates with the fewest points were nominated for eviction.
- ^Note 20: On Day 62, Gema won a special competition, saving herself from eviction and granting her a place in the final week.

== Total received nominations ==
	Week 1	Week 2	Week 3	Week 4	Week 5	Week 6	Week 7	Week 8	Week 9	Week 10 Final	Total
Mariana	9	Evicted	0	0	6	0	0	-2	0	Winner	15
Memo	3	9	5	4	-3	4	3	1	5	Runner-up	34
Karina	0	0	1	4	1	-2	13	1	13	3rd Place	33
Ese	1	4	4	10	-3	0	0	0	6	4th Place	25
Gema	2	8	0	0	0	12	10	0	5	5th Place	37
Yahir	0	4	4	10	-1	4	7	-5	10	6th Place	39
Ernesto	0	8	2	18	3	-8	6	5	4	7th Place	46
Brianda	2	2	0	7	1	-3	7	-5	5	Evicted	24
Cynthia	0	6	4	12	0	3	4	4	Evicted		33
Masad	2	11	7	7	0	0	13	Evicted			40
Gala	Not in House						0	Walked			0
Flor	1	5	11	7	0	4	Evicted				28
Aldo	0	2	2	6	-2	Walked					10
Luis	3	5	10	0	1	Evicted					19
Yanet	16	6	5	4	Evicted						31
Moisés	2	0	27	7	Evicted						36
Arantza	8	3	5	Evicted							16
Ximena	5	18	Evicted								23

== Episodes ==
No. overall	No. in season	Title	Original release date	Mexico viewers (millions)
Week 1
184	1	"Gala de apertura"	26 July 2026	3.70
Eighteen new housemates entered the house; however, it is revealed that Fede is a fake housemate who will not be competing, but will instead complete secret missions sent by the audience. The housemates were presented with an orange phone that would call to deliver a reward or a punishment. Arantza answered the first call and directly nominated Aldo for eviction. Flor answered the second call and rewarded Masad and Brianda a romantic dinner. Ximena answered the third call and left Yahir without his suitcase until Day 4. Cynthia answered the fourth call and named Gema as a finalist in the Head of Household competition. Gema answered the fifth and final call and gave Cynthia immunity for the week.
185	2	"Prueba de líder"	27 July 2026	1.77
On Day 2, Fede won the first Head of Household Competition of the season after facing Gema and Moisés in the final round.
186	3	"Prueba semanal"	28 July 2026	1.70
On Day 3, the housemates searched for the first Coin of Destiny of the season. Brianda found the coin and won the power to duplicate her nomination points. For their weekly task, the housemates had to pedal a total of 1000 km on three stationary bikes.
187	4	"Gala de nominación"	29 July 2026	1.96
On Day 4, Yanet, Mariana, Arantza, Ximena, Luis and Memo received the most nomination points were nominated along with Aldo.
188	5	"Gala de salvación"	30 July 2026	1.83
On Day 5, Arantza won the right to face Fede for the Power to Save.
189	6	"Noche de fiesta"	31 July 2026	1.87
On Day 6, the housemates successfully completed the weekly task and received a full budget for their weekly shopping. Arantza stole the Power to Save from Fede and saved herself from eviction.
190	7	"Gala de eliminación"	2 August 2026	3.68
On Day 8, Yanet, Aldo, Ximena and Memo were saved by the public, and Mariana was evicted after facing Luis in the carousel.
Week 2
191	8	"Prueba de líder"	3 August 2026	1.73
On Day 9, Moisés won the Head of Household Competition after facing Ese and Masad in the final round.
192	9	"Prueba semanal"	4 August 2026	1.74
On Day 10, Karina found the Coin of Destiny and had swap housemates of the Malibu and Tulum bedrooms. She sent Arantza to Malibu and Gema to Tulum. For their weekly task, when an alarm sounds, four housemates must race to a specific totem in the house to press their assigned color button within a set time.
193	10	"Gala de nominación"	5 August 2026	1.81
On Day 11, Ximena, Masad, Memo, Ernesto and Gema received the most nomination points were nominated for eviction.
194	11	"Gala de salvación"	6 August 2026	1.92
On Day 12, Masad won the right to challenge Moisés for his Power to Save.
195	12	"Noche de fiesta"	7 August 2026	1.76
On Day 13, the public voted for Memo to challenge Moisés for his Power to Save. Moisés successfully defended his Power to Save against Masad and Memo. He saved Gema from eviction. The housemates failed their weekly task and received 50% of their weekly shopping budget.
196	13	"Gala de eliminación"	9 August 2026	3.71
On Day 15, Ernesto and Memo were saved by the public, and Ximena was evicted after facing Masad in the carousel. Instead of going home, Ximena was sent to The Exile, where she was reunited with Mariana. Galilea informed them that they would be exiled for 48 hours and that the audience would vote for one of them to return to the house on Day 17.
Week 3
197	14	"Prueba de líder"	10 August 2026	1.87
On Day 16, La Jefa informed Fede that his time in the house was coming to an end and he would be leaving the next day. Brianda won the Head of Household Competition, defeating Cynthia and Moisés in the final round.
198	15	"Prueba semanal"	11 August 2026	2.03
On Day 17, Fede left the house and revealed to the housemates that he was a fake housemate. The housemates were able to view all of his secret missions. Mariana received the most votes to return to the house.
199	16	"Gala de nominación"	12 August 2026	2.01
For their weekly task, the housemates had to move a ball along a beam and drop it into the deposit box, with each ball being worth $100. On Day 18, a draw was held before nominations. The winners of the draw would receive powers chosen by the public. Arantza drew the yellow ball and won the power to void a housemates nominations; she voided Aldo's nominations. Yanet drew the green ball and nominated a fourth housemate with three points; she nominated Cythia. Moisés, Flor, Luis, Masad, Arantza, Memo and Yanet received the most nomination points were nominated for eviction.
200	17	"Gala de salvación"	13 August 2026	N/A
On Day 19, Gema and Moisés won the right to challenge Brianda for his Power to Save.
201	18	"Noche de fiesta"	14 August 2026	1.80
On Day 20, the housemates only managed to raise $10,500 of the $12,000 needed to pass the weekly task and received 50% of their shopping budget. Moisés stole the Power to Save from Brianda and saved himself from eviction.
202	19	"Gala de eliminación"	16 August 2026	3.63
On Day 22, Yanet, Masad, Luis and Memo were saved by the public, and Arantza was evicted after facing Flor in the carousel.
Week 4
203	20	"Prueba de líder"	17 August 2026	1.79
On Day 23, Gema won the Head of Household Competition after facing Ese in the final round. She revealed to the house that the HoH would receive a new perk: automatically nominate a housemate of their choice. Gema nominated Mariana for eviction.
204	21	"Prueba semanal"	18 August 2026	N/A
On Day 24, Luis found a Coin a Destiny and won a piggy bank that gave him the power to nominate a fourth housemate with 3 points.
205	22	"Gala de nominación"	19 August 2026	2.27
On Day 25, the housemates were presented with piggy banks that contained advantages and disadvantages for nominations. Ernesto, Cynthia, Ese, Yahir, Brianda, Flor, Masad and Moisés received the most nomination points were nominated for eviction.
206	23	"Gala de salvación"	20 August 2026	1.72
On Day 26, Brianda and Karina won the right to face Gema for the Power to Save.
207	24	"Noche de fiesta"	21 August 2026	1.69
On Day 27, the housemates failed their weekly task for the third week in a row and received 50% of their weekly shopping budget. Brianda stole the Power to Save from Gema and saved herself from eviction.
208	25	"Gala de eliminación"	23 August 2026	3.74
On Day 29, Flor, Masad, Cynthia, Ernesto and Yahir were saved by the public, and Moisés was evicted after facing Ese and Mariana in the carousel. Following the eviction, a public vote was opened for the audience to choose which housemate they consider to be furniture: a housemate who does not contribute to the house dynamics.
Week 5
209	26	"Prueba de líder"	24 August 2026	1.87
On Day 30, Luis, Yanet and Ese were named furniture by the public and sent to The Exile in a moving truck. Masad won the Head of Household Competition after defeating Karina in the final round. He nominated Gema for eviction.
210	27	"Prueba semanal"	25 August 2026	2.17
On Day 31, the housemates voted to save Ese, Luis and Yanet from eviction. Ese received the most votes and Yanet was evicted from the house by a vote of 6–3–2.
211	28	"Gala de nominación"	26 August 2026	2.24
On Day 32, the housemates searched through a ball pit for balls that determined their nomination points. Mariana, Ernesto, Brianda, Karina and Luis received the most nomination points were nominated for eviction.
212	29	"Gala de salvación"	27 August 2026	1.95
On Day 33, Brianda and Gema won the right to face Masad for the Power to Save.
213	30	"Noche de fiesta"	28 August 2026	1.92
On Day 34, the housemates successfully completed the weekly task and received a full budget for their weekly shopping. Brianda stole the Power to Save from Masad and saved herself from eviction.
214	31	"Gala de eliminación"	30 August 2026	3.49
On Day 36, Mariana, Ernesto and Karina were saved by the public, and Luis was evicted after facing Gema in the carousel.
Week 6
215	32	"Prueba de líder"	31 August 2026	1.87
On Day 37, Masad won the Head of Household Competition for the second week in a row after facing Brianda in the final round. Brianda answered the orange phone and was sent to the Agreement Room. Brianda called Gema to go to the room. Brianda and Gema then picked Karina's name from a raffle drum to enter the room. The public voted for Mariana to enter the room. Brianda, Gema, Karina and Mariana in turn chose Memo to enter the room. Afterwards, the five of them bid for immunity with the house's shopping budget. Mariana won immunity after bidding 40% of the weekly budget.
216	33	"Prueba semanal"	1 September 2026	1.96
On Day 38, Masad nominated Ese for eviction. Cynthia entered the Temptation Booth and nominated Yahir with 3 points so she could reunite with her boyfriend. Aldo voluntarily left the house for health reasons.
217	34	"Gala de nominación"	2 September 2026	2.17
On Day 39, the housemates made their nominations using a pegboard that assigned points to each nomination. Gema, Flor, Memo, Yahir and Cynthia received the most nomination points were nominated for eviction.
218	35	"Gala de salvación"	3 September 2026	2.01
On Day 40, Gema found a Coin of Destiny that allowed her and another nominated housemate to enter the Elevator of Destiny. She picked Memo. In the elevator, Memo won two envelopes with secret benefits. Karina won the right to challenge Masad for his Power to Save.
219	36	"Noche de fiesta"	4 September 2026	2.01
On Day 41, the housemates only managed to raise $9,610 of the $10,000 needed to pass the weekly task and received 30% of their shopping budget. Memo opened the two envelopes he won in the Elevator of Destiny and had to choose one reward: regain 20% of the weekly budget or join the final round of the Power to Save competition with a score of two points. He chose to increase the weekly budget to 50%. Masad successfully defended his Power to Save against Karina. He saved Yahir from eviction.
220	37	"Gala de eliminación"	6 September 2026	3.78
On Day 43, Cynthia, Memo and Gema were saved by the public, and Flor was evicted after facing Ese in the carousel. Following the eviction, season 2 contestant Gala Montes entered the house as a new housemate.
Week 7
221	38	"Prueba de líder"	7 September 2026	2.06
On Day 44, Brianda won the Head of Household Competition after facing Masad in the final round; however, her immunity was put up for auction in the Agreement Room. Brianda called Masad to join her in the room. Brianda and Masad then picked Yahir's name from a raffle drum to enter the room. The public voted for Ese to enter the room. Brianda, Masad, Yahir and Ese in turn chose Ernesto to enter the room. Ese won the immunity after bidding 40% of the weekly budget.
222	39	"Prueba semanal"	8 September 2026	2.04
On Day 45, Brianda nominated Mariana for eviction. Ernesto entered the Temptation Booth and nominated Karina with 3 points so he could reunite with his son.
223	40	"Gala de nominación"	9 September 2026	1.78
On Day 46, the housemates had to go through the Hospital of Horror in order to make their nominations. Karina, Masad, Gema, Brianda and Yahir received the most nomination points were nominated for eviction.
224	41	"Gala de salvación"	10 September 2026	2.07
On Day 47, Mariana, Masad and Yahir won a random draw to enter the Elevator of Destiny. In the elevator, Mariana won the quiz competition and had to choose between joining the final round of the Power to Save competition or receiving hazelnut spread for the house. She chose to compete for the Power to Save. Yahir won the right to challenge Brianda for her Power to Save.
225	42	"Noche de fiesta"	11 September 2026	2.00
On Day 48, Gema found a Coin of Destiny and picked Karina to share her rewards with. They each received a tower of hazelnut spread and opened the Box of Sacrifices, which contained punishments for the housemates. Gema and Karina sacrificed Cynthia and Masad. Cynthia was not allowed to clean the house for two days, while Masad had to clean the bathroom and showers for the next two days under Cynthia's supervision. The housemates successfully completed the weekly task and received 60% of their shopping budget, as Ese offered 40% in exchange for his immunity. Yahir stole the Power to Save from Brianda and saved himself from eviction.
226	43	"Gala de eliminación"	13 September 2026	3.64
On Day 50, Karina, Mariana and Gema were saved by the public, and Masad was evicted after facing Brianda in the carousel.
Week 8
227	44	"Prueba de líder"	14 September 2026	1.98
On Day 51, Mariana won the Head of Household Competition and her immunity was put up for auction in the Agreement Room. She spun a roulette wheel which determined that Gema would join her in the room. The public voted for Ese to enter the room. Ese then used darts to determine that Ernesto would join the room. Mariana, Gema, Ese and Ernesto in turn chose Memo to enter the room. Gema won the immunity after bidding 100% of the weekly budget.
228	45	"Prueba semanal"	15 September 2026	1.61
On Day 52, Mariana nominated Ese for eviction.
229	46	"Gala de nominación"	16 September 2026	2.54
On Day 53, Ernesto, Cynthia, Karina, Memo and Mariana received the most nomination points were nominated for eviction.
230	47	"Gala de salvación"	17 September 2026	1.96
On Day 54, Cynthia, Ese and Memo won a random draw to enter the Elevator of Destiny. In the elevator, Ese won the quiz competition and had to choose between joining the final round of the Power to Save competition or receiving 36 eggs and 5 packs of ham for the house. He chose to compete for the Power to Save. Brianda won the right to challenge Mariana for her Power to Save.
231	48	"Noche de fiesta"	18 September 2026	2.11
On Day 55, the housemates successfully completed the weekly task; however, because Gema offered 100% of the shopping budget in exchange for her immunity, the house received a basket full of basic food items. Mariana successfully defended her Power to Save against Brianda and Ese, and saved herself from eviction.
232	49	"Gala de eliminación"	20 September 2026	3.81
On Day 57, Ese, Karina and Memo were saved by the public, and Cynthia was evicted after facing Ernesto in the carousel.
Week 9
233	50	"Prueba de líder"	21 September 2026	1.87
On Day 58, Mariana won immunity and secured her place in the final week after facing Memo in the final round of the Finalist Competition.
234	51	"Prueba semanal"	22 September 2026	1.95
On Day 59, the contestants entered The Portal, a screen where they communicated for two minutes with a family member or friend who gave them recommendations on who they should nominate for eviction.
235	52	"Gala de nominación"	23 September 2026	2.12
On Day 60, La Jefa informed the housemates that they were allowed to discuss the nominations with each other. However, once in the Confession Room, La Jefa revealed that it is a positive nomination and that they must vote for who they want to see in the final week. Ese, Brianda, Gema, Memo and Ernesto received the fewest points were nominated for eviction, while Karina and Yahir advanced to the final week.
236	53	"Gala de salvación"	24 September 2026	2.08
On Day 61, the nominees entered the Elevator of Destiny. In the elevator, Gema won the quiz competition and received an advantage for the Power to Save competition.
237	54	"Noche de fiesta"	25 September 2026	2.03
On Day 62, the nominees played a Power to Save Competition. Gema won and advanced to the final week. The housemates successfully completed the weekly task and received a full budget for their weekly shopping.
238	55	"Gala de eliminación"	27 September 2026	4.07
On Day 64, Ernesto and Memo were saved by the public, while Brianda was evicted after facing Ese in the carousel.
Week 10
239	56	"Gala del 28 de septiembre, 2026"	28 September 2026	2.09
On Day 65, Karina, Memo and Gema received surprise visits from their friends and family.
240	57	"Gala del 29 de septiembre, 2026"	29 September 2026	2.26
On Day 66, friends and family of the finalists entered the house to spend 24 hours with them. Additionally, the housemates participated in a debate where they had the opportunity to discuss why they deserve to win the competition.
241	58	"Gala de eliminación"	30 September 2026	2.37
On Day 67, Ese, Mariana, Memo, Karina and Yahir were saved by the public, while Ernesto came in seventh place after facing Gema.
242	59	"Gala de eliminación"	1 October 2026	2.43
On Day 68, Gema, Memo, Ese and Mariana, while Yahir came in sixth place after facing Karina.
243	60	"Noche de fiesta"	2 October 2026	2.10
On Day 69, the finalists were reunited with the eliminated housemates to celebrate the last party inside the house.
244	61	"Gala de clausura"	4 October 2026	5.05
After 71 days, Mariana was crowned the winner of the season, with Memo as the runner-up, Karina in third place, Ese in fourth place and Gema in fifth place.
