= La casa de los famosos México season 3 =

La casa de los famosos México
- Season 3
- Hosted by: Galilea Montijo; Diego de Erice; Odalys Ramírez
- No. of days: 71
- No. of houseguests: 15
- Winner: Aldo de Nigris
- Runner-up: Dalilah Polanco
- No. of episodes: 61

Release
- Original network: Las Estrellas; Canal 5
- Original release: 27 July – 5 October 2025

Season chronology
- ← Previous; Season 2 Next → Season 4

The third season of the Mexican reality television series La casa de los famosos México premiered on 27 July 2025, with a live move-in on Las Estrellas. The show follows a group of celebrities who live together in a house while being constantly filmed with no communication with the outside world as they compete to win the cash grand prize.

The season was announced on 23 October 2024. Galilea Montijo, Diego de Erice and Odalys Ramírez returned as co-hosts of the series.

The season concluded on 5 October 2025, after 71 days of competition with Aldo de Nigris being crowned the winner, and Dalilah Polanco the runner-up.

== Format ==
The season follows a group of celebrities living in a house together with no communication with the outside world and are constantly filmed during their time in the house. During their stay, the housemates share their thoughts on events of the house and reveal their nomination points as well inside a private room referred to as the Confesionario (Confession Room). Additionally, each week the housemates are assigned tasks in order to win their allowance for food.

== Housemates ==
Name	Age	Occupation	Result	Ref
Aldo de Nigris	26	Influencer	Winner; Day 71	
Dalilah Polanco	53	Actress	Runner-up; Day 71	
Abel "Abelito" Saenz	25	Influencer	3rd Place; Day 71	
Clemente "Shiky" Rodríguez	53	TV personality	4th Place; Day 71	
Mar Contreras	44	Actress	5th Place; Day 71	
Alexis Ayala	59	Actor	6th Place; Day 67	
Aarón Mercury	24	Influencer	Evicted; Day 64	
Luis "Guana" Rodríguez	49	Actor	Evicted; Day 57	
Elaine Haro	21	Actress and singer	Evicted; Day 50	
Facundo Gómez	47	TV personality	Evicted; Day 43	
Mariana Botas	35	Actress	Evicted; Day 36	
Priscila Valverde	24	Model	Evicted; Day 29	
Ninel Conde	48	Actress and singer	Evicted; Day 22	
Adrián Di Monte	34	Actor	Evicted; Day 15	
Olivia Collins	67	Actress	Evicted; Day 8	

== Nominations table ==
Every week, each participant has to nominate two of their housemates, with the exception of the Head of Household who has immunity and cannot be nominated. The first person a housemate nominates is for 2 points, and the second nomination is for 1 point. At least five participants who had the highest amount of nomination points are nominated for eviction. The public is then able to vote online for who they want to save from eviction. The housemate who receives the least public votes is evicted that week.

This housemate was the Head of Household, and could not be nominated.
This housemate was nominated by their housemates.
This housemate was saved from eviction by the Power to Save holder.
This housemate was automatically put up for eviction by La Jefa.
This housemate was immune from eviction.

	Week 1	Week 2	Week 3	Week 4	Week 5	Week 6	Week 7	Week 8	Week 9	Week 10		
	Week 1	Week 2	Week 3	Week 4	Week 5	Week 6	Week 7	Week 8	Week 9	Day 67	Finale	
Aldo	Adrián; Priscila	Priscila; Shiky	Facundo; Priscila	~~Dalilah~~; ~~Shiky~~; Priscila; Mariana	Facundo; Dalilah	Shiky; Dalilah; Facundo	Dalilah; Shiky; Elaine	Dalilah; Guana; Shiky	Shiky; Dalilah; Alexis	No; Nominations	Winner (Day 71)	
Dalilah	Adrián; Priscila	Mar; Adrián	Alexis; Mar	Alexis; Mar	Aldo; Aarón	Facundo; Shiky; Aldo	~~Aldo~~; Aarón; Alexis	~~Aarón~~; Mar; Aldo	Alexis; Aldo; Abelito	No; Nominations	Runner-up (Day 71)	
Abelito	Priscila; Adrián	Priscila; Mariana	Mariana; Ninel	Mariana; Priscila	Facundo; Mariana	Facundo; Shiky; Dalilah	Aldo; Alexis; Shiky	Guana; Shiky; Dalilah	Shiky; Dalilah; Aarón	No; Nominations	Third place (Day 71)	
Shiky	~~Abelito~~; ~~Adrián~~	Alexis; Mar	Alexis; Mar	Mar; Guana; Elaine; Aldo	Aldo; Alexis	Dalilah; Facundo; Alexis	~~Alexis~~; ~~Aldo~~; ~~Aarón~~; Abelito; Elaine; Mar	Mar; Aldo; Alexis	Aarón; Abelito; Aldo	No; Nominations	Fourth place (Day 71)	
Mar	Priscila; Aldo	Mariana; Dalilah	Mariana; Ninel	~~Mariana~~; Shiky	Mariana; Facundo	Facundo; Shiky; Dalilah	Aldo; Shiky; Elaine	Dalilah; Guana; Shiky	Shiky; Dalilah; Alexis	No; Nominations	Fifth place (Day 71)	
Alexis	Facundo; Priscila	Dalilah; Priscila	Facundo; Ninel	Dalilah; Shiky	Facundo; Mariana	Shiky; Dalilah; Facundo	~~Dalilah~~; ~~Shiky~~; ~~Aldo~~; Elaine; Aarón; Mar	Aldo; Guana; Dalilah; Shiky	Dalilah; Shiky; Aldo	No; Nominations	Sixth place (Day 67)	
Aarón	Adrián; Priscila	Facundo; Shiky	Facundo; Priscila	Dalilah; Mariana	Dalilah; Facundo	Dalilah; Facundo; Shiky	Dalilah; Alexis; Aldo; Shiky	Dalilah; Guana; Shiky	Dalilah; Shiky; Abelito	Evicted (Day 64)		
Guana	Adrián; Aldo	Priscila; Elaine	Facundo; Shiky	Shiky; Priscila	Facundo; Abelito	Facundo; Dalilah; Shiky	Elaine; Aarón; Abelito	Aldo; Mar; Dalilah; Shiky	Evicted (Day 57)			
Elaine	Olivia; Adrián	Alexis; Adrián	Guana; Alexis	Guana; Alexis	Facundo; Aldo	Facundo; Shiky; Dalilah	Shiky; Dalilah; Abelito	Evicted (Day 50)				
Facundo	Elaine; Aarón	Adrián; Alexis	Aarón; Alexis	Aldo; Abelito	Abelito; Mar	Aarón; Abelito; Mar	Evicted (Day 43)					
Mariana	Adrián; Mar	Alexis; Mar	Mar	Alexis; Mar; Abelito	Alexis; Aarón	Evicted (Day 36)						
Priscila	Alexis; Adrián	Alexis; Mar	Alexis; Guana	~~Aldo~~; ~~Guana~~; Elaine; Priscila	Evicted (Day 29)							
Ninel	Olivia; Mar	Alexis; Mar	Mar; Alexis	Evicted (Day 22)								
Adrián	Ninel; Aarón	Dalilah; Facundo	Evicted (Day 15)									
Olivia	Ninel; Elaine	Evicted (Day 8)										
Notes	1	none	2	3, 4	5	6, 7	6, 8	6, 9, 10	6, 11	none		
Head of Household	Mariana	Ninel	Aldo	Aarón; Facundo	Shiky	Guana	Guana	Abelito	None			
Nominations (pre-save)	Adrián (13); Priscila (8); Ninel (4); Olivia (4); Elaine (3)	Alexis (11); Priscila (7); Mar (6); Dalilah (5); Adrián (4)	Alexis (9); Facundo (8); Mar (7); Mariana (4); Guana (3); Ninel (3)	Alexis (6); Guana (5); Priscila (5); Abelito (4); Dalilah (4); Mar (4); Mariana (4); Shiky (4)	Facundo (7); Aldo (5); Alexis (3); Dalilah (3); Aarón (2); Abelito (2); Mar (2); Mariana (2)	Facundo (21); Shiky (16); Dalilah (15); Aarón (3); Abelito (2)	Elaine (10); Shiky (7); Aarón (6); Aldo (6); Abelito (5); Alexis (5); Dalilah (5)	Dalilah (14); Aldo (13); Guana (12); Shiky (10)	Shiky (13); Dalilah (12); Alexis (5); Aarón (4); Abelito (4); Aldo (4)	None		
Power to Save Holder	Mariana	Dalilah	Elaine	Facundo	Shiky	Elaine	Guana	Abelito	Abelito	None		
Saved	Ninel	Dalilah	Mariana	Shiky	Facundo	Abelito	Dalilah	Aldo	Abelito	None		
Against public vote	Adrián; Priscila; Olivia; Elaine	Alexis; Priscila; Mar; Adrián	Alexis; Facundo; Mar; Guana; Ninel	Alexis; Guana; Priscila; Abelito; Dalilah; Mar; Mariana	Aldo; Alexis; Dalilah; Aarón; Abelito; Mar; Mariana	Facundo; Shiky; Dalilah; Aarón	Elaine; Shiky; Aarón; Aldo; Abelito; Alexis	Dalilah; Guana; Shiky	Shiky; Dalilah; Alexis; Aarón; Aldo	Abelito; Aldo; Alexis; Dalilah; Mar; Shiky	Abelito; Aldo; Dalilah; Mar; Shiky	
Evicted	Olivia; Fewest votes to save	Adrián; Fewest votes to save	Ninel; Fewest votes to save	Priscila; Fewest votes to save	Mariana; Fewest votes to save	Facundo; Fewest votes to save	Elaine; Fewest votes to save	Guana; Fewest votes to save	Aarón; Fewest votes to save	Alexis; Fewest votes to win	Mar; Fewest votes to win	Shiky; Fewest votes to win
Evicted	Olivia; Fewest votes to save	Adrián; Fewest votes to save	Ninel; Fewest votes to save	Priscila; Fewest votes to save	Mariana; Fewest votes to save	Facundo; Fewest votes to save	Elaine; Fewest votes to save	Guana; Fewest votes to save	Aarón; Fewest votes to save	Alexis; Fewest votes to win	Abelito; Fewest votes to win	Dalilah; Fewest votes to win
Evicted	Olivia; Fewest votes to save	Adrián; Fewest votes to save	Ninel; Fewest votes to save	Priscila; Fewest votes to save	Mariana; Fewest votes to save	Facundo; Fewest votes to save	Elaine; Fewest votes to save	Guana; Fewest votes to save	Aarón; Fewest votes to save	Alexis; Fewest votes to win	Aldo; Most votes to win	

- ^Note 1: On Day 1, Guana won from the Panel of Opportunities the power to annul a nomination. He annulled Shiky's nominations.
- ^Note 2: On Day 17, Mariana won a Coin of Destiny that allowed her to win the chance to give 3 points to her first nominee and 2 points to her second. However, she only passed the first part of the challenge and nominated one housemate with 3 points.
- ^Note 3: Due to a tie in the HoH competition, Aarón and Facundo were named Co-Head of Household.
- ^Note 4: In Week 4, each housemate randomly chose a piggy bank that contained within it an advantage or disadvantage that affected nominations.
  - Aarón was unable to share who he nominated until after the Power to Save ceremony. If he were to do so before, he would be automatically nominated.
  - Abelito was able to join any housemate from the Day bedroom to the confession room and hear their nominations. He was forced to go with Facundo, since he was the only housemate from that room who had not yet nominated.
  - Aldo's initial nomination of Dalilah and Shiky was annulled and he had to nominate two other housemates instead.
  - Alexis chose Priscila to share her nominations with the entire house. However, as Guana nominated on her behalf, he had to share who he had nominated in her place.
  - Dalilah's nominations were not affected.
  - Elaine duplicated her nomination points, giving 4 points to Guana and 2 points to Alexis.
  - Facundo was able to remove two nomination points against him. However, he was HoH and could not be nominated.
  - Guana had to share his nominations with the entire house.
  - Mar's points against Mariana were annulled.
  - Mariana had to nominate a third housemate with 3 points at the end of nominations in front of the entire house. She nominated Abelito.
  - Priscila's initial nomination of Aldo and Guana was annulled and a housemate from the Night bedroom had to nominate in her place. She picked Guana and he nominated Elaine and Priscila.
  - Shiky had to nominate two more housemates, one from each bedroom, with one point each. He nominated Elaine and Aldo.
- ^Note 5: In Week 5, a draw determined that Alexis and Facundo would nominate last and they would spin a roulette wheel to determine the amount of points given to their nominees. The results were:
  - Alexis: -3 points to Facundo and -1 point to Mariana
  - Facundo: 1 point to Abelito and 2 points to Mar.
- ^Note 6: This week, each housemate had six nomination points to give to three housemates, the first receiving 3 points, the second receiving 2 points, and the third receiving a single point.
- ^Note 7: On Day 39, a draw after nominations determined that Elaine and Alexis would receive the power of subtracting 4 points from the housemate of their choice. They chose each other, therefore, both subtracted 4 points from their total received points.
- ^Note 8: In Week 7, each housemate randomly chose an egg that contained within it an advantage or disadvantage that affected nominations.
  - Aarón had to nominate one more housemate with a point in front of the entire house. He nominated Shiky.
  - Abelito stayed in the confession room to hear the nominations of the next person, which was Dalilah.
  - Aldo chose Alexis to nominate for a second time.
  - Alexis's nomination of Dalilah, Shiky and Aldo was annulled and instead the points would be subtracted from their total received points. However, Aldo picked him to nominate for a second time and nominated Elaine, Aarón and Mar.
  - Dalilah's nomination of Aldo was annulled.
  - Elaine's nominations were not affected.
  - Guana chose the egg for the housemate who nominated after him, which was Abelito.
  - Mar removed three nomination points against her.
  - Shiky's initial nomination of Alexis, Aldo and Aarón was annulled and he had to nominate three other housemates instead.
- ^Note 9: On Day 51, Alexis entered the "Temptation Booth" and was offered the opportunity to speak with a family member in exchange for nominating either Aaron, Aldo, or Abelito with 6 points. Alexis nominated Aldo.
- ^Note 10: On Day 52, Abelito, Aldo, Guana and Shiky won a ticket to the "Panel of Terror" that allowed them to choose a special power for nominations. Abelito removed 3 nomination points against Mar, Aldo annulled Dalilah's 3-point nomination, Guana nominated four housemates with 2 points each, Shiky doubled his nomination points, giving 6 points to Mar, 4 points to Aldo and 2 points to Alexis.
- ^Note 11: On Day 58, Mar won the final competition, winning immunity from the final eviction and granting her a place in the finale.

== Total received nominations ==
	Week 1	Week 2	Week 3	Week 4	Week 5	Week 6	Week 7	Week 8	Week 9	Week 10 Final	Total
Aldo	2	0	0	3	5	1	6	13	4	Winner	34
Dalilah	0	5	0	4	3	15	5	14	12	Runner-up	58
Abelito	0	0	0	4	2	2	5	0	4	3rd Place	17
Shiky	0	2	1	4	0	16	7	8	13	4th Place	51
Mar	2	6	7	4	2	1	-1	7	0	5th Place	29
Alexis	2	11	9	6	3	-3	5	2	5	6th Place	43
Aarón	2	0	2	0	2	3	6	0	4	Evicted	19
Guana	0	0	3	5	0	0	0	12	Evicted		20
Elaine	3	1	0	3	0	-4	10	Evicted			17
Facundo	2	3	8	0	7	21	Evicted				41
Mariana	0	3	4	4	2	Evicted					13
Priscila	8	7	2	5	Evicted						22
Ninel	4	0	3	Evicted							7
Adrián	13	4	Evicted								17
Olivia	4	Evicted									4

== Episodes ==
No. overall	No. in season	Title	Original release date	Mexico viewers (millions)
Week 1
123	1	"Gala de apertura"	27 July 2025	3.39
124	2	"Prueba de líder"	28 July 2025	1.88
125	3	"Prueba semanal"	29 July 2025	2.24
126	4	"Gala de nominación"	30 July 2025	1.91
127	5	"Gala de salvación"	31 July 2025	2.03
128	6	"Noche de fiesta"	1 August 2025	2.36
129	7	"Gala de eliminación"	3 August 2025	4.39
Week 2
130	8	"Prueba de líder"	4 August 2025	1.75
131	9	"Prueba semanal"	5 August 2025	2.15
132	10	"Gala de nominación"	6 August 2025	2.12
133	11	"Gala de salvación"	7 August 2025	1.75
134	12	"Noche de fiesta"	8 August 2025	2.00
135	13	"Gala de eliminación"	10 August 2025	4.20
Week 3
136	14	"Prueba de líder"	11 August 2025	1.75
137	15	"Prueba semanal"	12 August 2025	2.13
138	16	"Gala de nominación"	13 August 2025	2.37
139	17	"Gala de salvación"	14 August 2025	2.08
140	18	"Noche de fiesta"	15 August 2025	2.02
141	19	"Gala de eliminación"	17 August 2025	4.36
Week 4
142	20	"Prueba de líder"	18 August 2025	2.08
143	21	"Prueba semanal"	19 August 2025	1.99
144	22	"Gala de nominación"	20 August 2025	2.81
145	23	"Gala de salvación"	21 August 2025	2.22
146	24	"Noche de fiesta"	22 August 2025	2.05
147	25	"Gala de eliminación"	24 August 2025	4.63
Week 5
148	26	"Prueba de líder"	25 August 2025	2.13
149	27	"Prueba semanal"	26 August 2025	2.23
150	28	"Gala de nominación"	27 August 2025	2.88
151	29	"Gala de salvación"	28 August 2025	1.96
152	30	"Noche de fiesta"	29 August 2025	2.20
153	31	"Gala de eliminación"	31 August 2025	5.08
Week 6
154	32	"Prueba de líder"	1 September 2025	2.16
155	33	"Prueba semanal"	2 September 2025	1.99
156	34	"Gala de nominación"	3 September 2025	2.27
157	35	"Gala de salvación"	4 September 2025	2.08
158	36	"Noche de fiesta"	5 September 2025	2.10
159	37	"Gala de eliminación"	7 September 2025	4.52
Week 7
160	38	"Prueba de líder"	8 September 2025	2.11
161	39	"Prueba semanal"	9 September 2025	2.27
162	40	"Gala de nominación"	10 September 2025	2.74
163	41	"Gala de salvación"	11 September 2025	2.13
164	42	"Noche de fiesta"	12 September 2025	2.13
165	43	"Gala de eliminación"	14 September 2025	4.48
Week 8
166	44	"Prueba de líder"	15 September 2025	N/A
167	45	"Prueba semanal"	16 September 2025	2.46
168	46	"Gala de nominación"	17 September 2025	2.48
169	47	"Gala de salvación"	18 September 2025	2.05
170	48	"Noche de fiesta"	19 September 2025	2.13
171	49	"Gala de eliminación"	21 September 2025	4.82
Week 9
172	50	"Prueba de líder"	22 September 2025	2.51
173	51	"Prueba semanal"	23 September 2025	2.22
174	52	"Gala de nominación"	24 September 2025	2.03
175	53	"Gala de salvación"	25 September 2025	2.21
176	54	"Noche de fiesta"	26 September 2025	2.08
177	55	"Gala de eliminación"	28 September 2025	4.57
Week 10
178	56	"Gala del 29 de septiembre, 2025"	29 September 2025	2.13
179	57	"Gala del 30 de septiembre, 2025"	30 September 2025	2.00
180	58	"Gala de eliminación"	1 October 2025	2.67
181	59	"Gala del 2 de octubre, 2025"	2 October 2025	2.44
182	60	"Gala del 3 de octubre, 2025"	3 October 2025	2.42
183	61	"Gala de clausura"	6 October 2025	6.91
