= Briggitte Bozzo =

Venezuelan actress

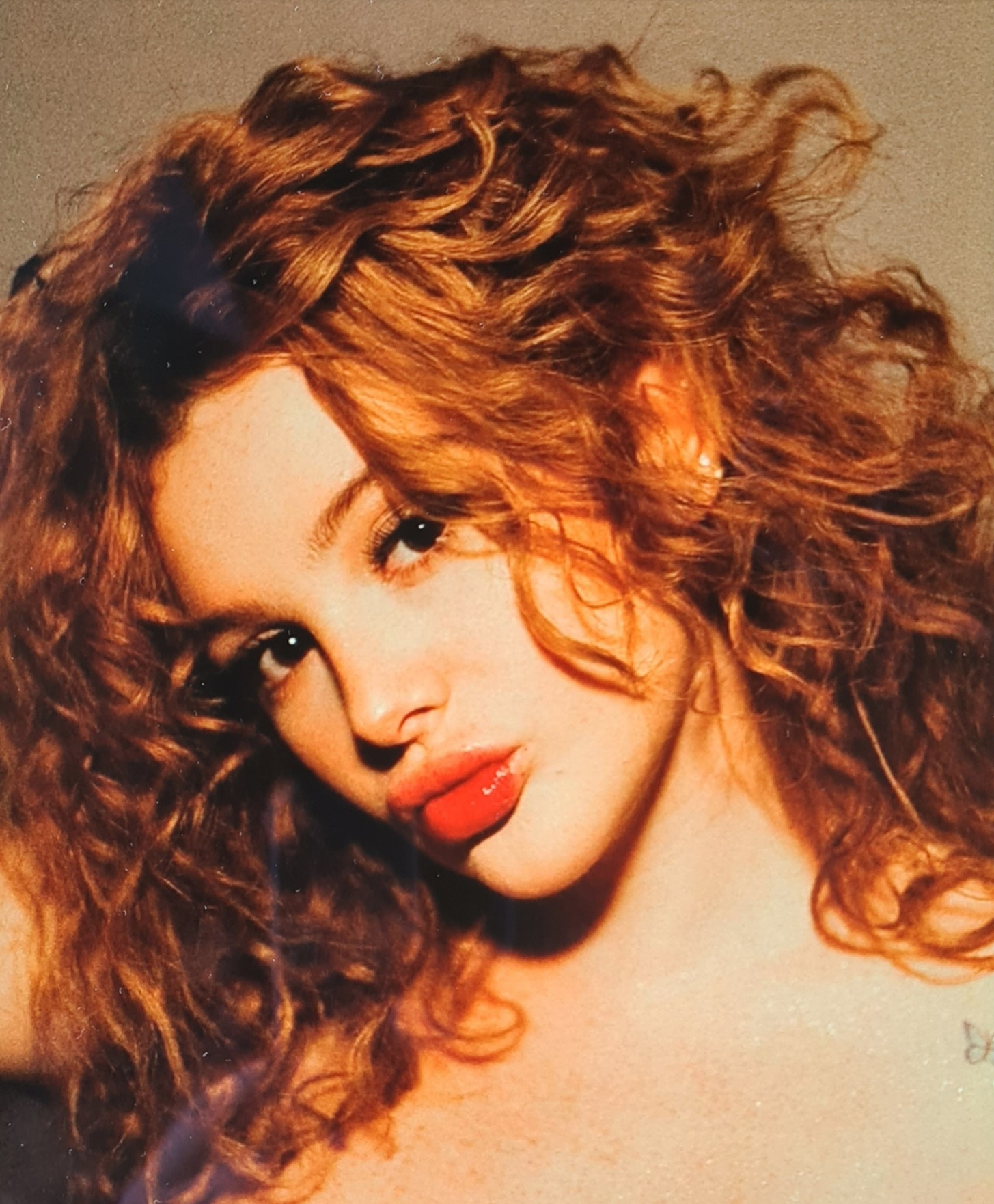
- Born: Briggitte Marina Bozzo Arcila; August 19, 2001 (age 23); Maracay, Venezuela
- Occupation: Actress
- Years active: 2004–present
- Known for: 5th place in "la casa de los famosos"

Briggitte Marina Bozzo Arcila (born August 19, 2001) is a Venezuelan actress.

== Filmography ==
Television roles
Year	Title	Role	Notes
2011	Amar de nuevo	Flor	
2012	Abismo de pasión	Elisa Castañón	13 episodes
2012–2013	Corazón valiente	Génesis Arroyo	
2013–2014	Quiero amarte	Valeria	102 episodes
2014	Señora Acero	Patricia Flores	12 episodes (season 1)
2014–2018	Como dice el dicho	Various roles	5 episodes
2016–2017	Silvana sin lana	María Guadalupe "Lupita" Villaseñor	100 episodes
2017	El vuelo de la Victoria	Ángela	34 episodes
2017–2018	Papá a toda madre	Juana Cruz	2 episodes
2018–2019	Like	Kathy Alonso	66 episodes
2024	La casa de los famosos México	Herself	Houseguest (season 2)

== Awards and nominations ==
Year	Award	Category	Nominated works	Result
2012	Premios People en Español	Newcomer of the Year	Corazón valiente	Nominated
