= Gala Montes =

Mexican actress and singer (born 2000)

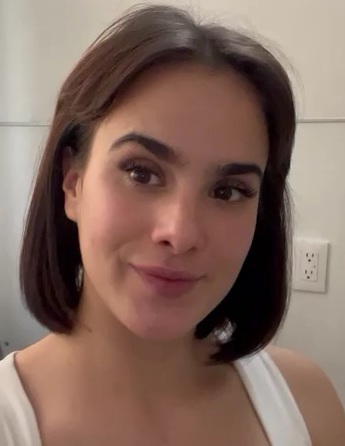
- Montes in 2022
- Born: Gala Fernández Montes De Oca; August 4, 2000 (age 26); Mexico City, Mexico
- Occupation: Actress
- Years active: 2007–present

Gala Fernández Montes de Oca (born August 4, 2000) is a Mexican actress best known for her works in telenovelas. She became known on television for her character as Luz Marina in the seasons three and four of the drug trafficking television series El Señor de los Cielos (2015–2016). In 2018, she landed her first lead role in a telenovela on Mi familia perfecta (2018). In 2020 she joined Televisa to be part of the main cast La mexicana y el güero, and subsequently she got her second lead role in the telenovela Diseñando tu amor (2021).

== Filmography ==
Film roles
Year	Title	Role	Notes
2023	¡Hasta la madre del Día de las Madres!	Lidia	
2023	Gringa	Heather	

Television roles
Year	Title	Role	Notes
2007	La niñera	Elena Fábregas	Main cast; 20 episodes
2009	Lo que callamos las mujeres	Miriam Solís Mendoza	Episode: "Buenos vecinos"
2010	Drenaje profundo	María Segura	Episode: "Soledad en los pasillos"
2011	Amar de nuevo	Rebeca	
2012	La otra cara del alma	Child Alma Hernández	
2013	Secretos de familia	Julieta Miranda	
2014	En otra piel	Emiliana Larrea	Main cast; 154 episodes
2015	UEPA! Un escenario para amar	Young Lourdes "Lule" Jordán	
2015–2016	El Señor de los Cielos	Luz Marina "Luzma" Casillas	Main cast (seasons 3–4); 112 episodes
2016	Hasta que te conocí	Rosenda	Episodes: "La luna ya se metió" and "Se acabó el después"
2018	Mi familia perfecta	Marisol Guerrero	Main role; 69 episodes
2020–2021	La mexicana y el güero	Katya Ibarrola	Main role; 127 episodes
2021	Diseñando tu amor	Valentina Fuentes Barrios	Main role
2021	¿Quién es la máscara?	Gitana	Season 3 runner-up
2021-2025	Acapulco	Aida	Recurring role (seasons 2–4); 6 episodes
2024	Vivir de amor	Rebeca Sánchez Trejo / Frida del Olmo Sandoval	Main role
2024; 2026	La casa de los famosos México	Housemate	Season 2; 3rd place Season 4; Walked
2024	Bola de locos	Herself	Episode: "Loca venganza"
2026	Corazón de oro	Catalina	Main role
