= Corazón de oro =

- Genre: Telenovela
- Based on: Coração d'Ouro by Pedro Lopes
- Written by: Luis Mariani; Mariana Palos; Gloria Bautista; Adrián Mazoy
- Directed by: Juan Carlos Muñoz; Jorge Robles Sánchez; Manolo Fernández
- Starring: Mayrín Villanueva; Gabriel Soto; Gala Montes
- Theme music composer: Luis Díaz Melgar; Gala Montes; Jorge Alejandro Perelló Undreiner
- Opening theme: "Corazón de oro" by Gala Montes
- Composers: Silvana Medrano; Luis Enrique González
- Country of origin: Mexico
- Original language: Spanish
- No. of seasons: 1
- No. of episodes: 80

Production
- Executive producer: Pedro Ortiz de Pinedo
- Producer: Liliana Cuesta Aguirre
- Cinematography: Ignacio González
- Editors: Rodrigo Lepe; Irving Rosas; Alma Hernández
- Camera setup: Multi-camera
- Production company: TelevisaUnivision

Original release
- Network: Las Estrellas
- Release: 2 March – 19 June 2026

Corazón de oro (English: A Heart of Gold) is a Mexican telenovela produced by Pedro Ortiz de Pinedo for TelevisaUnivision. It is based on the 2015 Portuguese telenovela Coração d'Ouro, created by Pedro Lopes. The series stars Mayrín Villanueva, Gabriel Soto and Gala Montes. It aired on Las Estrellas from 2 March 2026 to 19 June 2026.

== Plot ==
Luz lives with her daughter Catalina in a humble housing unit where she also has a taco stand. With what she earns there, she supports herself and her daughter. Catalina pretends to be a millionaire at school and doesn't mind taking every last penny from her mother to buy clothes to look expensive. One day, Luz receives a business proposal from a regular customer, Alberto, who claims to be a businessman. Luz discovers that Alberto is nothing more than Antonio's driver, whom she hasn't seen in over 20 years. At that time, Luz was fired from the Arango-Nova estate, accused of stealing a necklace from Antonio's wife. Antonio reveals to Luz that years ago his wife confessed that she fired her for having an affair with her son Eugenio, and that to keep it a secret, she made up the story about the necklace. Antonio wants to correct the mistakes of the past, so he offers Luz a job and to live at the estate again. Luz rejects him, revealing that she is keeping a secret about what really happened to get her fired.

Antonio meets Catalina, learns that she is Luz's daughter, and decides to tempt her with the idea of living on the estate so that she can help him convince her mother. Fascinated by the change of lifestyle that life on the Arango-Nova estate could offer her, Catalina tries to convince her mother, but faced with her refusal, she decides to start a fire in their apartment. Homeless, having lost everything, and faced with Antonio's promise that Eugenio will not return to Mexico, as he is now living in Spain, Luz agrees to return to the estate.

Teresa, Eugenio's sister, informs him that Luz has returned to the estate and he decides to return to Mexico. Catalina discovers that Antonio has included her mother in his will. However, faced with Teresa and Eugenio's attacks and their insistence that Antonio remove Luz from his life, she misinterprets Antonio's actions and believes that he is going to remove Luz from the will. In a fit of desperation, Catalina murders Antonio by suffocating him with his pillow so that everyone will believe that his illness killed him. As she leaves the room, she comes across Miguel Ángel, Antonio's blind son, who does not recognize her, but understands that his father did not die of natural causes. The reading of the will reveals that Antonio left a large sum of money and an important position in his company to Luz, which places her under suspicion.

Catalina confesses to Luz that she killed Antonio, assuring her that she did it at his request, as he wanted to end his suffering from his illness. Luz is not willing to let her daughter be accused and sacrifices herself by taking responsibility for the murder. However, after spending time in prison, it is discovered that Luz was elsewhere at the time of the crime and she is released. No one understands why she took the blame or who she is trying to protect. Upon leaving prison, Luz is a changed woman, determined to assert her rights and face the family and business war declared on her by Eugenio, Teresa, and all their accomplices.

== Cast ==
- Mayrín Villanueva as Luz Rueda López
- Gabriel Soto as Miguel Ángel Arango-Nova
- Gala Montes as Catalina Gómez Rueda
- Cynthia Klitbo as Roberta Ifigenia "Tita" Ramírez
- Andrea Torre as Teresa Arango-Nova
- Rafael Novoa as Zarco / Armando Valdéz
- Moisés Peñaloza as Leandro Pedraza
- Andrea Rossell as Miranda Arango-Nova
- Juan Pablo Gil as Dante Arango-Nova
- Erika de la Rosa as Elisa Sada
- Sergio Kleiner as Antonio Arango-Nova
- Diego Olivera as Eugenio Arango-Nova
- Julio Mannino as Vicente "Chente" Honorato Toledo
- Juan Ángel Esparza as Víctor Pedraza
- Pedro de Tavira as William Navarrete
- Ligia Uriarte as Julieta Mejía
- Mariazel Olle Casals as Aurora Rosas
- María Rocío García as Victoria Suárez
- Jorge Losa as Héctor Martínez
- Deicardi Díaz as Gabino Pérez
- Alejandra Andreu as Beatriz de Arango-Nova
- Fernando Robles as Horacio Balbuena
- Paulo Santiago as Pablo Arango-Nova
- Valeria Florián as Nadia Reyes
- Carla Trujillo as Severina Ugalde
- Alejandro Goguet as Juan de la Fuente
- Diego Rodríguez Doig as Santiago Cruz
- Marco Cordero as Omar Santaularia
- Daniela Gallardo as Berenice Alegret
- Gia Franschesci as Nayeli Molina Cervantes
- Lorena Bargalló as Olivia Larravari

== Production ==
On 16 October 2025, Mayrín Villanueva and Gabriel Soto were announced in the lead roles of Corazón de oro. The following day, Gala Montes was announced as the antagonist of the telenovela. The complete cast was confirmed on 21 November 2025. Filming of the telenovela took place from 9 December 2025 to 29 April 2026.

== Ratings ==
Viewership and ratings per season of Corazón de oro
Season	Timeslot (CT)	Episodes	First aired		Last aired		Avg. viewers (millions)
Season	Timeslot (CT)	Episodes	Date	Viewers (millions)	Date	Viewers (millions)	Avg. viewers (millions)
1	Mon–Fri 6:30 p.m.	80	2 March 2026	3.91	19 June 2026	3.92	3.71

== Episodes ==
No.	Title	Original release date	Mexico viewers (millions)
1	"No me quieres ver feliz"	2 March 2026 (Note: Premiered early online through Las Estrellas website on 27 February 2026.)	3.91
2	"Una vida que no me merezco"	3 March 2026	4.13
3	"Daría mi vida por ti"	4 March 2026	3.89
4	"¿Catalina es mi nieta?"	5 March 2026	3.82
5	"El que avisa no traiciona"	6 March 2026	4.23
6	"La sangre llama"	9 March 2026	4.02
7	"Tú no perteneces"	10 March 2026	4.32
8	"¡No lo puedo permitir!"	11 March 2026	3.99
9	"El hijo equivocado"	12 March 2026	4.12
10	"Esta herencia está maldita"	13 March 2026	3.67
11	"Necesito tu coartada"	16 March 2026	4.03
12	"Justicia para Luz"	17 March 2026	3.84
13	"¿Qué quieres con mi mamá?"	18 March 2026	3.94
14	"Prefiero regalar la herencia"	19 March 2026	3.85
15	"Nuestros destinos están atados"	20 March 2026	3.71
16	"Quiero 10 millones de pesos"	23 March 2026	3.81
17	"Puedo mantenerte a salvo"	24 March 2026	3.82
18	"Nadie podrá detenerme"	25 March 2026	4.01
19	"Una caja de Pandora"	26 March 2026	3.76
20	"¿Es mi papá?"	27 March 2026	4.17
21	"¡Quiero la verdad!"	30 March 2026	3.76
22	"Libertad en juego"	31 March 2026	3.56
23	"¡Quiero mi herencia!"	1 April 2026	3.82
24	"Nueva vida"	2 April 2026	3.09
25	"Vida en riesgo"	3 April 2026	2.61
26	"¡Viva la familia!"	6 April 2026	3.65
27	"No te debo nada"	7 April 2026	3.89
28	"Es él o nosotras"	8 April 2026	3.68
29	"Somos mujeres y estoy contigo"	9 April 2026	3.65
30	"Por fin se te cayó la máscara"	10 April 2026	3.90
31	"De noche, todos los gatos son pardos"	13 April 2026	3.64
32	"Miranda no regresó a casa"	14 April 2026	3.43
33	"Eres mi única esperanza"	15 April 2026	3.98
34	"Nadie se aprovecha de un Arango-Nova"	16 April 2026	3.60
35	"La verdad no tiene versiones"	17 April 2026	3.81
36	"Que seas feliz"	20 April 2026	3.75
37	"Luz quiere que corra sangre"	21 April 2026	4.08
38	"La mejor victoria es vencer sin combatir"	22 April 2026	3.51
39	"Disfruta viendo mi miedo"	23 April 2026	3.88
40	"¿Pensabas que me iba a esconder?"	24 April 2026	3.55
41	"Un blanco en la espalda"	27 April 2026	3.56
42	"Destruir a la persona que amo"	28 April 2026	3.71
43	"La verdad sobre Luz Rueda"	29 April 2026	3.47
44	"Una venganza contra los Arango-Nova"	30 April 2026	3.42
45	"No te me vas a ir viva"	1 May 2026	3.39
46	"Vida en riesgo"	4 May 2026	3.66
47	"Tu hija lleva mi sangre"	5 May 2026	3.85
48	"El dolor y la angustia que has cargado"	6 May 2026	4.32
49	"Nuestra venganza será la justicia"	7 May 2026	3.78
50	"Destruí a mi hija"	8 May 2026	3.75
51	"Decidimos adelantar la boda"	11 May 2026	3.74
52	"Podrías perder el patrimonio de tu hija"	12 May 2026	3.87
53	"El destino decidió separarnos"	13 May 2026	3.60
54	"Pensé que lo amabas"	14 May 2026	3.37
55	"Un clavo saca otro clavo"	15 May 2026	3.56
56	"No perdamos más el tiempo"	18 May 2026	3.79
57	"Nunca es tarde para rectificar el camino"	19 May 2026	3.80
58	"Muere por pertenecer"	20 May 2026	3.83
59	"Derecho de sangre"	21 May 2026	3.88
60	"Conmigo, la lealtad lo es todo"	22 May 2026	3.80
61	"Me devolviste la vista"	25 May 2026	3.52
62	"El que la hace, la paga"	26 May 2026	3.90
63	"No es la santa que todos piensan"	27 May 2026	3.75
64	"La ropa sucia se lava en casa"	28 May 2026	3.67
65	"No tuvo la culpa de haber nacido"	29 May 2026	3.63
66	"Ya no soy ciego"	1 June 2026	3.25
67	"Empiezo a ver tu ambición"	2 June 2026	3.68
68	"Todo se está yendo al diablo"	3 June 2026	3.43
69	"Sé quién miente"	4 June 2026	3.98
70	"Yo soy tu padre"	5 June 2026	3.44
71	"Alguien debe detenerlo"	8 June 2026	3.59
72	"La sangre es lo que une"	9 June 2026	3.79
73	"Te pareces tanto a mí"	10 June 2026	3.37
74	"Te voy a estar vigilando"	11 June 2026	3.57
75	"Estoy harta de mis propias mentiras"	12 June 2026	3.25
76	"Nunca te voy a perdonar"	15 June 2026	3.51
77	"Nuestra sangre está maldita"	16 June 2026	3.33
78	"Yo no dejo cabos sueltos"	17 June 2026	3.79
79	"Por favor, detenla"	18 June 2026	2.54
80	"Todos cometemos errores"	19 June 2026	3.92
