= La casa de los famosos México season 2 =

La casa de los famosos México
- Season 2
- Hosted by: Galilea Montijo; Diego de Erice; Odalys Ramírez
- No. of days: 71
- No. of houseguests: 15
- Winner: Mario Bezares
- Runner-up: Karime Pindter
- No. of episodes: 61

Release
- Original network: Las Estrellas; Canal 5
- Original release: 21 July – 29 September 2024

Season chronology
- ← Previous; Season 1 Next → Season 3

The second season of the Mexican reality television series La casa de los famosos México premiered on 21 July 2024, with a live move-in on Las Estrellas. The show follows a group of celebrities who live together in a house while being constantly filmed with no communication with the outside world as they compete to win the cash grand prize.

The season was announced on 18 October 2023. Galilea Montijo, Diego de Erice and Odalys Ramírez returned as co-hosts of the series. The panelists for Sunday episodes were season one housemate Sofia Rivera Torres, alongside Cynthia Urías, René Franco and Juan Carlos Nava.

The season concluded on 29 September 2024, after 71 days of competition with Mario Bezares being crowned the winner, and Karime Pindter the runner-up.

== Format ==
The season follows 15 celebrities living in a house together with no communication with the outside world and are constantly filmed during their time in the house. During their stay, the housemates share their thoughts on events of the house and reveal their nomination points as well inside a private room referred to as the Confesionario (Confession Room). A change this season is that the five housemates with the most nomination points are put up for eviction, unlike the previous season where the top four were put up for eviction. Additionally, each week the housemates are assigned tasks in order to win their allowance for food.

== Twists ==
=== Power to Save Competition ===
This season, the housemates have the opportunity to challenge the HoH and steal their benefit of saving one of the nominees. The houseguests first compete against each other for the right to face-off against the HoH. The winner then goes head-to-head with the HoH for the power to save.

== Housemates ==
Name	Age	Occupation	Result	Ref
Mario Bezares	65	Comedian	Winner; Day 71	
Karime Pindter	31	TV personality	Runner-up; Day 71	
Gala Montes	23	Actress and singer	3rd Place; Day 71	
Arath de la Torre	49	TV personality	4th Place; Day 71	
Briggitte Bozzo	22	Actress and influencer	5th Place; Day 67	
Agustín Fernández	34	Model	Evicted; Day 64	
Sian Chiong	30	Actor and singer	Evicted; Day 57	
Ricardo Peralta	34	Influencer	Evicted; Day 50	
Adrián Marcelo	34	Influencer and TV personality	Walked; Day 46	
Araceli "Gomita" Ordaz	29	TV personality	Evicted; Day 43	
Sabine Moussier	58	Actress	Evicted; Day 36	
Mariana Echeverría	40	TV host and comedian	Evicted; Day 29	
Luis "Potro" Caballero (Note: Luis Caballero previously participated on the second season of La casa de los famosos USA.)	32	Influencer and TV personality	Evicted; Day 22	
Shanik Berman	65	Journalist	Evicted; Day 15	
Paola Durante	49	TV personality	Evicted; Day 8	

== Nominations table ==
Every week, each participant has to nominate two of their housemates, with the exception of the Head of Household who has immunity and could not be nominated. The first person a housemate nominates is for 2 points, and the second nomination is for 1 point. At least five participants who had the highest amount of nomination points are nominated for eviction. The public is then able to vote online for who they want to save from eviction. The housemate who receives the least public votes is evicted that week.

This housemate was the Head of Household, and could not be nominated.
This housemate was nominated by their housemates.
This housemate was saved from eviction by the Power to Save holder.
This housemate was automatically put up for eviction by La Jefa.
This housemate was immune from eviction.

	Week 1	Week 2	Week 3	Week 4	Week 5	Week 6	Week 7	Week 8	Week 9	Week 10		
	Week 1	Week 2	Week 3	Week 4	Week 5	Week 6	Week 7	Week 8	Week 9	Day 67	Finale	
Mario	Shanik; Agustín	Sian; Shanik	Sabine; Mariana	Ricardo; Mariana	Sian; Sabine	Sian; Gomita	Sian; Ricardo	Sian; Arath; Gala	Agustín; Arath; Gala	No; Nominations	Winner (Day 71)	
Karime	Sian; Briggitte	Gala; Sian	Mariana; Sabine	Gomita; Mariana	Sian; Sabine	Gomita; Sian	Ricardo; Sian	Sian; Mario; Briggitte	Agustín; Mario; Arath	No; Nominations	Runner-up (Day 71)	
Gala	Mario; Paola	Shanik; Briggitte	Sabine; Mariana	Gomita; Agustín	Sabine; Sian	Adrián; Gomita; Sian	Ricardo; Sian	Karime; Sian; Briggitte	Agustín; Briggitte; Mario	No; Nominations	Third place (Day 71)	
Arath	Agustín; Gomita	Adrián; Shanik	Sabine; Mariana	Mariana; Ricardo	Sian; Sabine	Adrián; Sian	Sian; Ricardo	Sian; Gala; Briggitte	Agustín; Gala; Briggitte	No; Nominations	Fourth place (Day 71)	
Briggitte	Mario; Shanik	Mariana; Sabine	Mariana; Sabine	Mariana; Gomita	Sabine; Sian	Gomita; Sian	Sian; Ricardo	Sian; Karime; Mario	Agustín; Mario; Arath	No; Nominations	Fifth place (Day 67)	
Agustín	Briggitte; Paola	Briggitte; Mario	Briggitte; Mario	Briggitte; Mario	Mario; Briggitte; Gala	Briggitte; Karime	Briggitte; Gala	Arath; Mario; Briggitte	Briggitte; Mario; Gala	Evicted (Day 64)		
Sian	Agustín; Mariana	Karime; Mario	Mario; Karime	Mario; Arath	Mario; Arath	Karime; Briggitte	Karime; Briggitte	Mario; Karime; Arath	Evicted (Day 57)			
Ricardo	Mario; Shanik	Karime; Briggitte	Karime; Briggitte	Arath; Mario	Arath; Gala	Gala; Briggitte	Mario; Arath	Evicted (Day 50)				
Adrián	Paola; Briggitte	Arath; Briggitte	Gala; Briggitte	Briggitte; Gala	Briggitte; Gala	Gala; Briggitte	Walked (Day 46)					
Gomita	Briggitte; Sian	Gala; Briggitte	Gala; Briggitte	Gala; Briggitte	Gala; Arath	Karime; Briggitte	Evicted (Day 43)					
Sabine	Shanik; Paola	Briggitte; Gomita	Karime; Briggitte	Mario; Arath	Gala; Briggitte	Evicted (Day 36)						
Mariana	Paola; Briggitte	Arath; Briggitte	Mario; Karime	Mario; Briggitte	Evicted (Day 29)							
Potro	Shanik; Paola	Briggitte; Arath	Gala; Mario	Evicted (Day 22)								
Shanik	Potro; Adrián	Gala; Briggitte	Evicted (Day 15)									
Paola	Mariana; Agustín	Evicted (Day 8)										
Notes	1	none	2	3	4	5	6, 7	8, 9	8, 10			
Head of Household	Sabine	Ricardo	Adrián	Sabine; Sian	Karime	Agustín	Agustín	Agustín	None			
Nominations (pre-save)	Paola (8); Shanik (8); Briggitte (7); Agustín (6); Mario (6)	Briggitte (12); Gala (6); Arath (5); Karime (4); Shanik (4)	Mariana (8); Sabine (7); Briggitte (6); Gala (6); Karime (6); Mario (6); Adrián; Agustín; Arath; Gomita; Potro; Ricardo; Sian	Mario (8); Briggitte (6); Mariana (6); Gomita (5); Arath (4)	Sian (8); Arath (6); Gala (6); Sabine (5); Mario (3)	Gomita (7); Briggitte (6); Sian (6); Adrián (5); Karime (5)	Briggitte (3); Karime (2); Mario (2); Ricardo (2); Sian (2)	Mario (8); Sian (7); Arath (6); Briggitte (6); Gala (3)	Agustín (15); Mario (7); Briggitte (6); Arath (4); Gala (4)	None		
Power to Save Holder	Gala	Ricardo	None	Sabine	Sian	Agustín	Sian	Arath	Gala	None		
Saved	Agustín	Briggitte	None	Gomita	Sian	Sian	Sian	Gala	Gala	None		
Against public vote	Paola; Shanik; Briggitte; Mario	Gala; Karime; Arath; Shanik	Mariana; Sabine; Briggitte; Gala; Karime; Mario; Adrián; Agustín; Arath; Gomita; Potro; Ricardo; Sian	Mario; Briggitte; Mariana; Arath	Arath; Gala; Sabine; Mario	Gomita; Briggitte; Adrián; Karime	Briggitte; Karime; Mario; Ricardo	Mario; Sian; Arath; Briggitte	Agustín; Mario; Briggitte; Arath	Arath; Briggitte; Gala; Karime; Mario	Arath; Gala; Karime; Mario	
Walked	None						Adrián	None				
Evicted	Paola; Fewest votes to save	Shanik; Fewest votes to save	Potro; Fewest votes to save	Mariana; Fewest votes to save	Sabine; Fewest votes to save	Gomita; Fewest votes to save	Ricardo; Fewest votes to save	Sian; Fewest votes to save	Agustín; Fewest votes to save	Briggitte; Fewest votes to win	Arath; Fewest votes to win	Gala; Fewest votes to win
Evicted	Paola; Fewest votes to save	Shanik; Fewest votes to save	Potro; Fewest votes to save	Mariana; Fewest votes to save	Sabine; Fewest votes to save	Gomita; Fewest votes to save	Ricardo; Fewest votes to save	Sian; Fewest votes to save	Agustín; Fewest votes to save	Briggitte; Fewest votes to win	Karime; Fewest votes to win	
Evicted	Paola; Fewest votes to save	Shanik; Fewest votes to save	Potro; Fewest votes to save	Mariana; Fewest votes to save	Sabine; Fewest votes to save	Gomita; Fewest votes to save	Ricardo; Fewest votes to save	Sian; Fewest votes to save	Agustín; Fewest votes to save	Briggitte; Fewest votes to win	Mario; Most votes to win	

- ^Note 1: Sabine could not participate in the HoH competition due to a health issue, and housemate Karime replaced her. At the end, Karime won the final competition, therefore, Sabine became in the Head of Household of that week.
- ^Note 2: Due to conspiring and announcing their nominations to rig the results, all housemates were nominated for eviction, including the HoH (Adrián). Consequently, the Power to Save for that week was cancelled.
- ^Note 3: The HoH competition was played in pairs. Sabine and Sian won the competition and became Co-Head of Household; however, only one of them could receive immunity from nominations, while the other had to defend the benefit of saving one of the nominees. A head-to-head competition determined that Sian would have immunity, while Sabine would defend the Power to Save.
- ^Note 4: In Week 5, each housemate randomly chose a piggy bank containing an advantage or disadvantage inside.
  - Adrian's nominees, Briggitte and Gala, were deducted two and one point respectively from their total received nomination points.
  - Agustin's was allowed to nominate a third person, but each of his nominees could only receive one point.
  - Arath's nominations were broadcast to the entire house.
  - Briggitte was asked to immediately reveal to her nominees how many points she gave each of them.
  - Gala's two points against Sabine were annulled.
  - Gomita was asked not to share her nominations until after the Power to Save competition. If she were to do so before, she would be automatically nominated.
  - Mario was allowed to view the nominations of any housemate who had already nominated at that point. He chose to view Adrián's nominations.
  - Ricardo duplicated his nomination points, giving 4 points to Arath and 2 points to Gala.
  - Sabine was asked to join Arath into the confession room during his nominations.
  - Sian was allowed to view HoH Karime's nominations.
- ^Note 5: Gala won the power to give six nomination points to three housemates, the first receiving 3 points, the second receiving 2 points, and the third receiving a single point.
- ^Note 6: On Day 46, Adrián walked from the game after a confrontation with Gala for a comment he made in the previous eviction show in which he stated: "one less woman to mistreat".
- ^Note 7: In Week 7, a draw determined that Mario would nominate last and he would spin a roulette wheel to determine the amount of points given to his nominees. The results were: -4 points to Sian and -4 points to Ricardo.
- ^Note 8: This week, each housemate had six nomination points to give to three housemates, the first receiving 3 points, the second receiving 2 points, and the third receiving a single point.
- ^Note 9: In Week 8, a draw determined that Gala would nominate last and she would spin a roulette wheel to determine the amount of points given to her nominees. The results were: -5 points to Karime, -5 points to Sian and +3 points to Briggitte.
- ^Note 10: In the final Power to Save competition, the five nominees competed against each other to save themselves from eviction and become a finalist.

== Total received nominations ==
	Week 1	Week 2	Week 3	Week 4	Week 5	Week 6	Week 7	Week 8	Week 9	Week 10 Final	Total
Mario	6	2	6	8	3	0	2	8	7	Winner	42
Karime	0	4	6	0	0	5	2	0	0	Runner-up	17
Gala	0	6	6	3	6	4	1	3	4	3rd Place	33
Arath	0	5	0	4	6	0	1	6	4	4th Place	26
Briggitte	7	12	6	6	2	6	3	6	6	5th Place	54
Agustín	6	0	0	1	0	0	0	0	15	Evicted	22
Sian	3	3	0	0	8	6	2	7	Evicted		29
Ricardo	0	0	0	3	0	0	2	Evicted			5
Adrián	1	2	0	0	0	5	Walked				8
Gomita	1	1	0	5	0	7	Evicted				14
Sabine	0	1	7	0	5	Evicted					13
Mariana	3	2	8	6	Evicted						19
Potro	2	0	0	Evicted							2
Shanik	8	4	Evicted								12
Paola	8	Evicted									8

== Episodes ==
No. overall	No. in season	Title	Original release date	Mexico viewers (millions)
Week 1
62	1	"Gala de apertura"	21 July 2024	2.71
63	2	"Prueba de líder"	22 July 2024	1.39
64	3	"Prueba semanal"	23 July 2024	1.26
65	4	"Gala de nominación"	24 July 2024	1.36
66	5	"Gala de salvación"	25 July 2024	1.55
67	6	"La vida en fotos y fiesta"	26 July 2024	1.33
68	7	"Gala de eliminación"	28 July 2024	2.59
Week 2
69	8	"Prueba de líder"	29 July 2024	1.57
70	9	"Prueba semanal"	30 July 2024	1.72
71	10	"Gala de nominación"	31 July 2024	1.80
72	11	"Gala de salvación"	1 August 2024	1.64
73	12	"La vida en fotos y fiesta"	2 August 2024	1.66
74	13	"Gala de eliminación"	4 August 2024	2.67
Week 3
75	14	"Prueba de líder"	5 August 2024	1.80
76	15	"Prueba semanal"	6 August 2024	1.89
77	16	"Gala de nominación"	7 August 2024	2.14
78	17	"Gala de salvación"	8 August 2024	1.90
79	18	"La vida en fotos y fiesta"	9 August 2024	1.70
80	19	"Gala de eliminación"	11 August 2024	3.70
Week 4
81	20	"Prueba de líder"	12 August 2024	2.00
82	21	"Prueba semanal"	13 August 2024	2.00
83	22	"Gala de nominación"	14 August 2024	2.40
84	23	"Gala de salvación"	15 August 2024	2.20
85	24	"La vida en fotos y fiesta"	16 August 2024	2.00
86	25	"Gala de eliminación"	18 August 2024	3.90
Week 5
87	26	"Prueba de líder"	19 August 2024	2.20
88	27	"Prueba semanal"	20 August 2024	2.20
89	28	"Gala de nominación"	21 August 2024	2.70
90	29	"Gala de salvación"	22 August 2024	2.40
91	30	"La vida en fotos y fiesta"	23 August 2024	2.30
92	31	"Gala de eliminación"	25 August 2024	4.30
Week 6
93	32	"Prueba de líder"	26 August 2024	2.30
94	33	"Prueba semanal"	27 August 2024	2.20
95	34	"Gala de nominación"	28 August 2024	2.60
96	35	"Gala de salvación"	29 August 2024	2.10
97	36	"La vida en fotos y fiesta"	30 August 2024	2.22
98	37	"Gala de eliminación"	1 September 2024	4.58
Week 7
99	38	"Prueba de líder"	2 September 2024	2.49
100	39	"Prueba semanal"	3 September 2024	2.35
101	40	"Gala de nominación"	4 September 2024	2.79
102	41	"Gala de salvación"	5 September 2024	N/A
103	42	"La vida en fotos y fiesta"	6 September 2024	1.94
104	43	"Gala de eliminación"	8 September 2024	3.91
Week 8
105	44	"Prueba de líder"	9 September 2024	1.66
106	45	"Prueba semanal"	10 September 2024	1.96
107	46	"Gala de nominación"	11 September 2024	2.24
108	47	"Gala de salvación"	12 September 2024	2.23
109	48	"La vida en fotos y fiesta"	13 September 2024	1.99
110	49	"Gala de eliminación"	15 September 2024	3.06
Week 9
111	50	"Prueba de líder"	16 September 2024	2.51
112	51	"Prueba semanal"	17 September 2024	1.91
113	52	"Gala de nominación"	18 September 2024	2.07
114	53	"Gala de salvación"	19 September 2024	2.00
115	54	"La vida en fotos y fiesta"	20 September 2024	2.09
116	55	"Gala de eliminación"	22 September 2024	3.66
Week 10
117	56	"Gala del 23 de septiembre, 2024"	23 September 2024	1.76
118	57	"Gala del 24 de septiembre, 2024"	24 September 2024	1.86
119	58	"Gala de eliminación"	25 September 2024	2.61
120	59	"Gala del 26 de septiembre, 2024"	26 September 2024	1.98
121	60	"Gala del 27 de septiembre, 2024"	27 September 2024	2.02
122	61	"Gala de clausura"	29 September 2024	5.50
