= Cynthia Klitbo =

Mexican actress (born 1967)

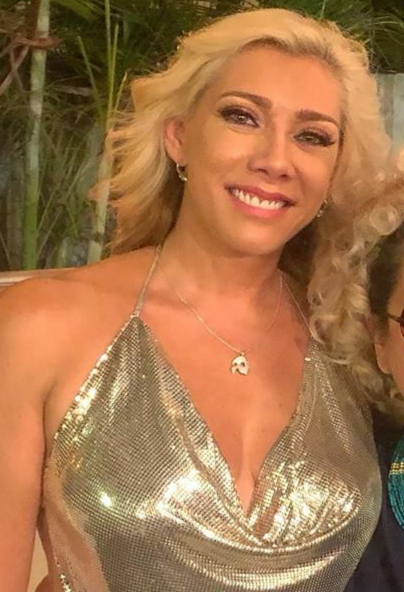
- Klitbo in 2019
- Born: Cynthia Klitbo; March 11, 1967 (age 59); Mexico City, Mexico
- Occupation: Actress
- Years active: 1984-present
- Spouse(s): Jorge Antolín (m. 1987; div. 1989) Francisco Gattorno (m. 1995; div. 1997) Ruben Lira (m. 2005; div. 2007) David Gerstein (m. 2012; div. 2016)
- Children: 1

Cynthia Klitbo (Spanish pronunciation: [ˈsintja ˈkliðβo]; born March 11, 1967) is a Mexican actress of telenovelas, theater and Mexican cinema. She is best known for her roles as Laura in Televisa's telenovela La Dueña (Mexico) (1995), as Tamara de Duval in Televisa's telenovela El privilegio de amar (1998), and as Raquela Villaseñor in the telenovela Velo de novia (2003), as well as Juana Godoy de González in Televisa's telenovela Teresa (2010).

== Biography ==
Cynthia Klitbo was born on March 11, 1967, in Mexico City, Santa Maria la Ribera neighborhood, to a Danish father and a Mexican mother. She began her television career in 1987, competing in “La Modelo del Año” where she placed 2nd; the winner was Carina Ricco, and 3rd place was the actress Angelica Rivera (former Mexican first lady), and playing a secondary character in the telenovela Como Duele Callar Amor en Silencio; Mi Segunda Madre, Yo Compro Esa Mujer, and Cadenas de Amargura soon followed.

After a brief hiatus in the mid-1990s, she returned to the small screen in La Dueña. Notable performances in Alguna vez Tendremos alas, El Privilegio de Amar, and La Casa en la Playa established Klitbo as one of the best known actresses of her generation.

Klitbo's work in telenovelas made her recognizable internationally. Although she has starred as a protagonist, she is best known for her performances as a villain. An example is Klitbo's portrayal of the envious and psychotic Laura in La Duena opposite Angelica Rivera. Her portrayal in El Privilegio de Amar as Tamara won her a prize in Premios TvyNovelas as best antagonist. In the said telenovela, Klitbo had to shave her head in a scene to portray her character's emotional defeat and insanity.

In 2005 Klitbo also worked as director of the telenovela Alborada produced by Carla Estrada. However, the two television personalities conflicted and Klitbo left the production days later. Later in the year she participated in the reality show Bailando por un sueño ("Dancing for a dream"), the Mexican version of Strictly Come Dancing, (the United States version is Dancing with the Stars).

On Tuesday, August 1, 2006, she gave birth to an 8.5 pound baby girl via caesarian section. She named her Elisa Fernanda. On Saturday, September 29, 2012, Klitbo married the sculptor David Gerstein in a civil ceremony. The religious ceremony took place in February 2013.

== Filmography ==
=== Films ===
| Year | Title | Role | Notes |
|---|---|---|---|
| 1990 | Ellos trajeron la violencia | | Film debut |
| 1991 | Asalto | Elena | |
| 1995 | Morena | María | |
| 1996 | El amor de tu vida S.A. | Eugenia | |
| 1999 | La paloma de Marsella | | |
| 2003 | Ladies' Night | Victima | |
| 2004 | Desnudos | Berta | |

=== Television ===
| Year | Title | Role | Notes |
|---|---|---|---|
| 1987 | Cómo duele callar | Cristina Cisneros | Main cast |
| 1988 | Amor en silencio | Aurora | Supporting role |
| 1989 | Mi segunda madre | Leticia | |
| 1990 | Yo compro esa mujer | Efigenia | Supporting Role |
| 1990 | Mi pequeña Soledad | | Guest star |
| 1991 | Cadenas de amargura | Sofía Gastélum | Main cast |
| 1991 | Vida robada | Leticia Avelar | Main cast |
| 1993 | Videoteatros: Véngan corriendo que les tengo un muerto | Various roles | |
| 1993 | Sueño de amor | Ana Luisa | Main cast |
| 1995 | La dueña | Laura Castro Villarreal | Main cast |
| 1996 | Mujer, casos de la vida real | Various roles | "Un problema para dos" (Season 12, Episode 19); "Si pudiera amarte" (Season 12, Episode 28) |
| 1997 | Alguna vez tendremos alas | Rosaura Ontiveros | Main cast |
| 1998-1999 | El privilegio de amar | Tamara de la Colina | Main cast |
| 2000 | La casa en la playa | Paulina Villarreal de Rojo | Lead role |
| 2000 | Mi destino eres tú | Amara Trujillo | |
| 2003 | Velo de novia | Raquela Villaseñor | Main cast |
| 2005 | Peregrina | Abigaíl Osorio | Main cast |
| 2007 | Sexo y otros secretos | Laura | "Sexo y más secretos" (Season 1, Episode 12); "Amigas por siempre" (Season 1, Episode 13) |
| 2007-2008 | Palabra de mujer | Delia Ibarra | Main cast |
| 2008 | La rosa de Guadalupe | Elisa | Episode: "A la orilla del cielo" |
| 2009-2010 | Atrévete a soñar | Bianca Peña | Main cast |
| 2010 | Locas de amor | Doctora Ayala | Recurring role |
| 2010 | Mujeres asesinas | Luz Mercedes | "Luz, Arrolladora" (Season 3, Episode 12) |
| 2010-2011 | Teresa | Juana Godoy | Main cast |
| 2012 | Por ella soy Eva | Mujer Borracha | Guest star |
| 2012 | Cachito de cielo | Adela Silva | Main cast |
| 2013-2014 | De que te quiero, te quiero | Carmen Garcia | Main cast |
| 2014-2015 | La sombra del pasado | Prudencia Mendoza de Zapata | |
| 2016-2017 | Vino el amor | Marta Estrada Vda. de Muñoz | Main cast |
| 2018 | Hijas de la luna | Leonora Ruíz de Oropeza | Main cast |
| 2019-2020 | El Dragón: Return of a Warrior | Dora Perdomo de Garza | Main cast |
| 2020 | Médicos, línea de vida | Carmen Menchaca | Guest star |
| 2020 | Como tú no hay 2 | Socorro Pérez | Guest star |
| 2021–22 | Junta de vecinos | Genoveva de la Colina | Lead role |
| 2022 | Mujer de nadie | Isaura Henderson de Arizmendi | Main cast |
| 2022–24 | Secretos de villanas | Herself | Main cast |
| 2023 | Juego de mentiras | Renata del Río | |
| 2023 | Minas de pasión | Zaira Pérez | |
| 2024 | Lalola | Cirse | Main cast |
| 2024 | La historia de Juana | Josefina Sosa de Bravo | Main cast |
| 2024 | Amor amargo | Beatriz San José | Guest star |
| 2025 | Monteverde | Gloria Domínguez | Main cast |
| 2025 | ¿Quién es la máscara? | Ruby Gloss | Season 7 contestant |
| 2026 | Corazón de oro | Tita | Main cast |
| 2026 | La casa de los famosos México | Herself | Housemate (season 4) |

== Awards and nominations ==
| Year | Award | Country | Category | Work | Result |
|---|---|---|---|---|---|
| 1988 | TVyNovelas Awards | Mexico | Best Female Revelation | Como duele callar | Nominated |
| 1990 | Palmas de oro | Mexico | Best New Stage Actress | La desconfianza | Won |
| 1991 | Estrellas de plata | Mexico | Best Female Villain | Cadenas de amargura | Won |
| 1991 | TVyNovelas Awards | Mexico | Best Female Antagonist | Cadenas de amargura | Won |
| 1992 | Estrella de plata | Mexico | Best New Stage Actress | La desconfianza | Won |
| 1993 | UCCT Award | Mexico | Best New Stage Actress | La desconfianza | Won |
| 1995 | APT award | Mexico | Best New Actress | Juicio suspendido | Won |
| 1995 | Palmas de oro | Mexico | Best Female Villain | La Dueña | Won |
| 1995 | Estrella de plata | Mexico | Best Female Villain | La Dueña | Won |
| 1995 | El Heraldo | Mexico | Best New Film Actress | El amor de tu vida, S.A. | Won |
| 1995 | Amistad Award | Mexico | Best Actress | La Dueña | Won |
| 1996 | Framingo Award | United States | | La Dueña | Won |
| 1996 | ACCA Award | United States | | La Dueña | Won |
| 1996 | ACE Award | United States | Best Actress in a Supporting Role | La Dueña | Won |
| 1996 | TVyNovelas Awards | Mexico | Best Female Antagonist | La Dueña | Nominated |
| 1999 | Gran águila Award | Venezuela | Best Actress | El privilegio de amar | Won |
| 1999 | TVyNovelas Awards | Colombia | Best Actress | Alguna vez tendremos alas | Won |
| 1999 | El Heraldo | Mexico | Best Antagonist | El privilegio de amar | Won |
| 1999 | TVyNovelas Awards | Mexico | Best Female Villain | El privilegio de amar | Won |
| 1999 | Ace Awards | United States | Best Film Actress | El amor de tu vida, S.A. | Won |
| 1999 | Estrella Awards | Venezuela | Best Actress | El privilegio de amar | Won |
| 1999 | Mara Awards | Venezuela | Best Actress | El privilegio de amar | Won |
| 1999 | Bravo Awards | Mexico | Best Female Villain | El privilegio de amar | Won |
| 1999 | Quetzal Awards | Mexico | Best Female Villain | El privilegio de amar | Won |
| 1999 | El sol de oro | Mexico | Best Actress | El privilegio de amar | Won |
| 1999 | Palmas de oro | Mexico | Best Antagonist | El privilegio de amar | Won |
| 2000 | El Sol de oro | Mexico | Best Actress | Rosa de dos aromas | Won |
| 2000 | Las palmas de oro | Mexico | Best Actress | Rosa de dos aromas | Won |
| 2000 | Ace Awards | United States | Best Actress in a Telenovela | La casa en la playa | Won |
| 2004 | TVyNovelas Awards | Mexico | Best Female Antagonist | Velo de novia | Nominated |
| 2006 | TVyNovelas Awards | Mexico | Best Female Antagonist | Peregrina | Nominated |
| 2009 | TVyNovelas Awards | Mexico | Best Female Antagonist | Palabra de mujer | Nominated |
| 2010 | TVyNovelas Awards | Mexico | Best Female Antagonist | Atrévete a soñar | Nominated |
| 2014 | TVyNovelas Awards | Mexico | Best Co-star Actress | De Que Te Quiero, Te Quiero | Won |
| 2014 | TVyNovelas Awards | Mexico | Best Leading Actress | De Que Te Quiero, Te Quiero | Nominated |
| 2017 | TVyNovelas Awards | Mexico | Best Leading Actress | Vino el amor | Nominated |
