= Te volveré a encontrar =

Peruvian telenovela

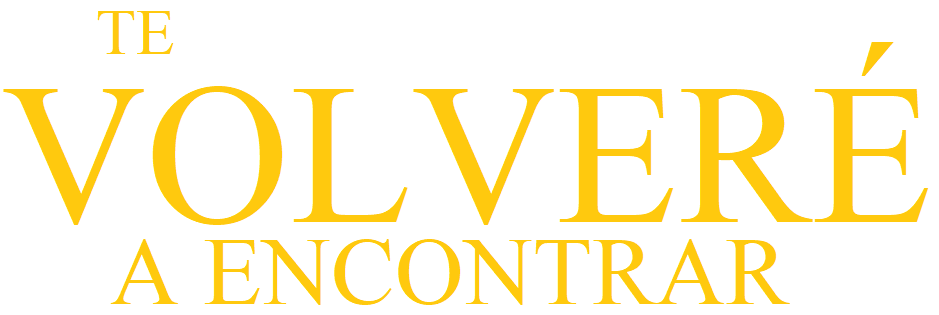
- Genre: Telenovela
- Created by: Miguel Zuloaga
- Written by: Augusto Cabada; Fotunada Barrios; Marcela Cossíos
- Directed by: Luis Barrios
- Starring: Alondra García Miró; Denisse Dibós; Sergio Paris; Johanna San Miguel; Pablo Heredia; George Slebi; Nicola Porcella
- Theme music composer: Roxx Hendel
- Opening theme: "Te volveré a encontrar" by Renato Bonifaz
- Country of origin: Peru
- Original language: Spanish
- No. of seasons: 1
- No. of episodes: 120

Production
- Executive producer: Cecilia Rodríguez
- Producers: Miguel Zuloaga; Mariana Ramírez del Villar
- Camera setup: Multi-camera
- Production company: ProTV Producciones

Original release
- Network: América Televisión
- Release: 20 April – 2 October 2020

Te volveré a encontrar is a Peruvian telenovela created by Miguel Zuloaga. It stars Alondra García Miró, Denisse Dibós, Sergio Paris, Johanna San Miguel, Pablo Heredia, George Slebi and Nicola Porcella.

The telenovela was filmed from 20 November 2017 to 24 August 2018. For unknown reasons, its premiere, which was initially planned for mid-2018, was delayed. Eventually, América Televisión decided to premiere the telenovela on 20 April 2020, to avoid a lack of programming due to the COVID-19 pandemic, which caused the halt of filming for productions that were airing at that time due to the lockdown ordered by the Peruvian government.

== Plot ==
Rosa María and Lucy are two women whose lives were stolen and who are confined in a camp in the Peruvian Amazonia, living a life of slavery. Rosa María is married to Leonardo, and they have three young children. When things aren't going well in her marriage with Leonardo, Rosa María makes the mistake of having an affair with Máximo Venero. Máximo becomes obsessed with Rosa María to such an extent that, during a trip she and her husband are taking, he orchestrates Leonardo's death and kidnaps Rosa María, making her appear dead for over 20 years. This event also causes Rosa María to lose her memory. Meanwhile, Lucy was kidnapped by Máximo when she was a child during an ambush on her parents that stemmed from a debt settlement with him.

Máximo is the leader of a drug trafficking organization, which he runs with the ambitious Elena and their henchmen Matías, Beni, and Eliseo. Within this organization, Rosa María and Lucy are imprisoned and exploited by Máximo as slaves to him and his men. Years later, Lucy manages to escape the camp and flees to Lima, in search of her past and the past of Rosa María, the woman she loves like a mother. Paolo, Camilo, and Nicolás, Rosa María's sons, are now adults and completely unaware of their mother's story, whom they believe to be dead. But above all, they are unaware that the main person responsible for their mother's disappearance is their aunt Milena, who was in cahoots with Máximo so that she could inherit all of her sister Rosa María's fortune, whom she hates and envies.

== Cast ==
- Alondra García Miró as Katerina "Perla" Larsen Valle-Riestra / Lucy Flores Dancourt
- Denisse Dibós as Rosa María Ferrara Lizarazo de Valdemar "Nanita"
- George Slebi as Camilo Valdemar Ferrara
- Pablo Heredia as Paolo Valdemar Ferrara
- Nicola Porcella as Nicolás Valdemar Ferrara / Nicolás Venero Ferrara
- Alessandra Fuller as Denisse Guerra Blanco
- Ana Cecilia Natteri as Renata Valdivieso Medina de Dancourt "La Faraona"
- César Ritter as Benigno "Beni" Morales Albear
- Diego Carlos Seyfarth as Matías Pinzón Varela / Matías Mocanleano Montero
- Flavia Laos as Dolores "Lola" Bengoa Ferrara
- Francisca Aronsson as Vanessa Valdemar Valladares
- Gustavo Borjas as Víctor "Vitucho" Mendoza Prada
- Javier Valdés as Pascal Bengoa Bustamante
- Johanna San Miguel as Milena Ferrara Lizarazo
- Karina Jordán as Elena Guadalupe Trelles / Elena Hernández Bravo-Jordán
- Leslie Stewart as Martina Blanco Valdemar de Guerra
- Mayra Goñi as Bárbara "Barbie" Romo Villanueva
- Maju Mantilla as Inés Roldán Barrera
- María Victoria Santana as Teresa "Tere" Arévalo Portocarrero
- Milene Vázquez as Antonella Valladares Camargo
- Nicolás Osorio as Daniel "Dani" Linares Echegaray
- Patricia Portocarrero as Estrella Villanueva Acosta
- Ramiro Porró as Rafael Lucioni "Rafa" Incháustegui González
- Renato Bonifaz as Eliseo Farfán Puerto-Bolívar
- Juan Carlos Rey de Castro as Sebastián Gaviria Barjuch
- Sergio Paris as Máximo Venero Moreno / Claudio Santoro
- Thalía Estabridis as Rubí Salas Morante
- Marisa Minetti as Eva Roldán Barrera
- Gianfranco Brero as Alfredo Larsen Romero
- Cecilia Brozovich as Ivette Dancourt Valdivieso "Soraya"

== Reception ==
The telenovela premiered on 20 April 2020, becoming the most watched program in primetime with a percentage rating of 20.2 points.
