= Poncho de Nigris =

Mexican television presenter, entrepreneur and influencer (born 1976)

- Born: Alfonso de Nigris Guajardo; 3 March 1976 (age 50); Monterrey, Nuevo León, Mexico
- Education: Universidad Regiomontana
- Years active: 2003-present
- Children: 4
- Relatives: Antonio de Nigris (brother); Aldo de Nigris (brother)

Alfonso de Nigris Guajardo (born March 3, 1976) is a Mexican television and Internet personality. He hosted various shows for the Monterrey-based regional network Multimedios Televisión. His brothers are the former football players Antonio and Aldo de Nigris.

De Nigris first came to prominence in the second season of Big Brother México in 2003, where he placed third in the competition. He would later be the contestant in the 2011 cycle of Multimedios's dating competition Mitad y Mitad involving a season-long process of finding him a partner, and hosted Pura Gente Bien on sister channel Altavisión, along with El Club del Italiano for Televisa Regional's Monterrey Televisión; the latter would be cancelled in 2013 after making jokes targeting the station's anti-bullying campaign.

He returned to television in February 2015 with the premiere of Poncho en Domingo on Multimedios, where he was paired with co-host Marcela Mistral. The two began a relationship, and after de Nigris proposed, they were married in a broadcast ceremony recorded on November 23, 2015, and aired on November 25.

== Filmography ==
Television roles
Year	Title	Role	Notes
2003	Big Brother México	Himself	Reality show
2006	Código postal	Mateo Ayala	Supporting role
2006	La fea más bella	Himself	Guest star
2008	Central de abasto	Himself	Supporting role
2010	Vivalavi	Himself	Co-host (morning show)
2011-19	Mitad y mitad	Himself	Lead contestant, coach and host (dating show)
2011	Méteme gol	Beny Terranova	Lead role
2011	Pura gente bien (PGB)	Himself	Host
2012	El club del italiano	Himself	Host
2016	Poncho en domingo	Himself	Host
2020	¿Quién es la máscara?	Monster, himself	Guest star
2023	La casa de los famosos México	Himself	3rd Place
