= Nicola Porcella =

Peruvian actor, host and former footballer

- Born: Nicola Emilio Porcella Solimano; 5 February 1988 (age 38); Lima, Peru
- Other name: Nico
- Citizenship: Peru; Italy
- Occupations: Ex-footballer; actor
- Years active: 2001–present
- Height: 1.75 m (5 ft 9 in)
Association football career
- Position: Defender
Youth career
- 2001–2005: Circolo Sportivo Italiano
Senior career*
Years	Team	Apps	(Gls)
2006–2007	FBC Melgar		
2008–2009	Deportivo Municipal		
2010	Sport Boys		
- * Club domestic league appearances and goals

Nicola Emilio Porcella Solimano (born 5 February 1988) is a Peruvian reality star, host, actor and retired footballer. After many years of an established career in Peru, he became known in Latin American countries as "El Novio de Mexico" due to his participation in the hit reality show La casa de los famosos México of the TelevisaUnivision conglomerate, in which he won 2nd place as well as the hearts of the audience for his loyalty, and charismatic personality.

== Early life and education ==
Porcella was born in Lima, Peru, on 5 February 1988. After his parents got divorced, he moved in with his dad. He has one younger brother, making him the oldest son of Francesco Porcella and Fiorella Solimano.

He attended elementary school at Colegio Carmelitas and later, he attended the first years of high school in Argentina where he began to play football. After spending time in that country, he returned to Peru to finish his studies at the Agnus Dei College.

== Career ==
Porcella was trained as a teenager in the youth division of the Circolo Sportivo Italiano, a team where he won tournaments in his category such as the Copa de la Amistad and Copa Adeclub.

In 2006, he made his professional debut at FBC Melgar. In 2008, he was signed as a new reinforcement of the Deportivo Municipal football club, which was active in the second division.

Porcella joined the Sport Boys football club in the under-17 category, initially in the reserve team, where he stood out as a striker. During his footballer career, he already mastered dribbling while participating in the local tournament, scoring goals, including his goal against Universidad San Marcos as a player on the mayor's team.

In 2010, he decided to retire from football to work as a cabin crew member. His image was later popularized in the media campaigns of the Chalaco team, of which he has declared himself an admirer. Later, he ventured as an aviation pilot, until entering television.

=== TV career ===
At the same time with his sports profession, Porcella entered publicly for the first time on television as a cameo in the series Así Es La Vida in 2006. Years later in 2011, he entered the reality shows Very Verano, as part of the model staff, to later participate in Canta Si Puedes. Months later, he entered the reality show Combate, where he was in the second season for a short time.

In 2012, he rose to fame after being a participant on the reality show Esto es guerra. He was the first contestant to win the show alongside his ex-partner, former Peruvian reality star and host Angie Arizaga, and earned the title of "Best Warrior" in 2014 for producing the show. He consolidated himself in later seasons for América Televisión, in the role of historical captain of the Las Cobras team, and as the greatest reference for Peruvian children and adolescents in the 2014 ConcorTV report due to his seasoned character. As the image of the Peruvian show business, he was a presenter at various nightclubs and quinceañera events.

In 2013, he participated as a guest in the Peruvian miniseries Vacaciones En Grecia as Stefano Ricchi. In 2014, he participated in the Peruvian version of the television show Sabes Más Que Un Niño De Primaria. He was also entered as a "sought after bachelor" for the Peruvian version of The Choice. In addition, he co-hosted the summer season of the television show Estás En Todas with Jaime "Choca" Mandros and Sheyla Rojas. In 2016, he returned to host the show, and in 2017 he was announced as a permanent host.

In 2015, while he worked in parallel with Esto Es Guerra, he had a special participation in the telenovela Ven, Baila, Quinceañera as Piero del Campo. Simultaneously, he received acting classes with actor Ramón García. That same year, he debuted as a presenter on the reality show Esto Es Euerra Teens alongside Yaco Eskenazi. In 2016, he had a special participation in the program El Búnker of the Peruvian radio station Onda Cero next to Rafael Cardozo, where he remained until 2018.

In 2018, Porcella was included in the cast of the telenovela Te volveré a encontrar as Nicolás Valdemar, his second performance for the production company ProTV Productions. After seven years, in 2019, he resigned from América Television and signed a contract with Latina Televisión. On the channel he was part of the television program Todo Por Amor, where he shared hosting duties with the former child animator Karina Rivera.

In 2020, he traveled to Mexico, to be part of the reality show of that country Guerreros of the Televisa network, where his performance positioned him among the top 10 contestants of the first season, with 54% of victories in the tests,

In 2021, he was summoned as the leader of the Peruvian delegation of Esto Es Guerra to face the Puerto Rican version of the program, where his team lost. In that year, he returned to host his web program El Show De Los Sábados together with actor Miguel Vergara. Later, he returned to the second season of Guerreros. In September of that year, he joined the aforementioned Mexican reality team to face his visiting Peruvian counterpart, Esto Es Guerra, where he ultimately won his team.

In 2022 he returned to acting for Televisa, in addition to his participation in the third season of the reality show Reto 4 Elementos. Next, he hosted a program on the YouTube platform, in which he interviews various characters from the Peruvian and international show business.

Then in 2023, he reached the final, placing second on the reality show La casa de los famosos México, broadcast on TelevisaUnivision channels: Las Estrellas, Canal 5 and the Hispanic streaming service Vix.

=== Other activities ===
In 2014, Porcella was featured as the face of his own clothing brand N12. In 2015, he and Rafael Cardozo founded the production company Corona Producciones without success. In 2022, he was the host of the Habla kausa program on Radio Karibeña.

== Personal life ==
Although Porcella was never married, he did conceive his son Adriano who was born in 2012 with his then girlfriend and Peruvian make-up artist, Francesca Lazo. Their relationship ended soon after the birth of their son, but they remain friends and maintain a healthy coparent relationship to this day. She supported him in his latest reality show, La Casa de Los Famosos Mexico, by being his voice outside of the house whenever it was needed. With the success of his participation in the reality, Porcella is arranging things to bring his mother, son and Francesca from Peru to his new residence in Mexico.
