= La casa de los famosos México =

- Genre: Reality competition
- Created by: John de Mol Jr.
- Based on: Celebrity Big Brother
- Presented by: Galilea Montijo; Diego de Erice; Odalys Ramírez
- Country of origin: Mexico
- Original language: Spanish
- No. of seasons: 4
- No. of episodes: 244

Production
- Executive producer: Rosa María Nogueron
- Production location: Mexico City, Mexico
- Camera setup: Multi-camera
- Running time: 60–150 minutes
- Production companies: TelevisaUnivision; Endemol Shine Boomdog

Original release
- Network: Las Estrellas; Canal 5
- Release: 4 June 2023 – present

Related
- Big Brother México; La casa de los famosos

La casa de los famosos México (transl. The House of the Famous Mexico) is the Mexican version of the reality television franchise Celebrity Big Brother, itself a spin-off of Big Brother. Produced by Rosa María Noguerón for TelevisaUnivision, the series premiered on 4 June 2023 on Las Estrellas.

Following three successful seasons of the American version, La casa de los famosos, aired on Telemundo, TelevisaUnivision revived the Big Brother format in Mexico under this new title, seeking to replicate its success in the local market. It is the third Mexican adaptation of the franchise, after Big Brother México and Big Brother VIP, which were last produced by Televisa in 2015 and 2005, respectively.

In October 2025, the series was renewed for a fourth season, that premiered on 26 July 2026. In October 2026, the series was renewed for a fifth season.

== History ==
Strong rumors suggested the return of the format for about a year, until it was finally confirmed in April 2023. A few days later, Hoy confirmed that their morning host Galilea Montijo would be a host, alongside Diego de Erice and Odalys Ramírez.

The reality show would also follow La casa de los famosos of airing the show Sunday through Friday. The only difference is that Sundays would broadcast on Televisa's main channel Las Estrellas, while the weekday episodes would air on Canal 5. Montijo would be hosting Wednesday's nomination and Sunday's elimination live shows, while De Erice and Ramírez would be co-hosting together on the other weeknights. Additionally, Pablo Chagra would be in charge of social media platforms, whereas Cecilia Galeano and Mauricio Garza present the pre-show and post-show on ViX, Televisa's streaming platform where the 24/7 is shown.

On 18 October 2023, TelevisaUnivision renewed the series for a second season. The second season premiered on 21 July 2024. On 23 October 2024, TelevisaUnivision renewed the series for a third season. The third season premiered on 27 July 2025. On 6 October 2025, TelevisionUnivision renewed the series for a fourth season. The fourth season premiered on 26 July 2026. On 4 October 2026, TelevisaUnivision renewed the series for a fifth season.

== Series overview ==
Series	Episodes	Originally released		Days	HouseGuests	Winner	Runner–up
Series	Episodes	First released	Last released	Days	HouseGuests	Winner	Runner–up
1	61	4 June 2023	13 August 2023	71	14	Wendy Guevara	Nicola Porcella
2	61	21 July 2024	29 September 2024	71	15	Mario Bezares	Karime Pindter
3	61	27 July 2025	5 October 2025	71	15	Aldo de Nigris	Dalilah Polanco
4	61	26 July 2026	4 October 2026	71	19	Mariana Ochoa	Memo Schutz

== Reception ==
=== Ratings ===
Viewership and ratings per season of La casa de los famosos México
Season	Timeslot (CT)	Episodes	First aired		Last aired		Avg. viewers (millions)
Season	Timeslot (CT)	Episodes	Date	Viewers (millions)	Date	Viewers (millions)	Avg. viewers (millions)
1	Sunday 8:30 p.m. Mon–Fri 10:00 p.m.	61	4 June 2023	3.80	13 August 2023	5.10	2.08
2	Sunday 8:30 p.m. Mon–Fri 10:00 p.m.	60	21 July 2024	2.71	29 September 2024	5.50	2.33
3	Sunday 8:30 p.m. Mon–Fri 10:00 p.m.	60	27 July 2025	3.39	5 October 2025	6.91	2.64
4	Sunday 8:30 p.m. Mon–Fri 10:00 p.m.	59	26 July 2026	3.70	4 October 2026	5.05	2.33

=== Awards and nominations ===
Year	Award	Category	Nominated	Result	Ref
2024	Produ Awards	Best Adapted Coexistence Reality Series	La casa de los famosos México	Won	
2025	Produ Awards	Best Adapted Coexistence and Relationships Reality Series	La casa de los famosos México	Nominated	
