= Diego de Erice =

Mexican actor

- Born: August 9, 1986 (age 39); Mexico City, Mexico
- Occupations: Actor; Writer
- Years active: 2010–present
- Works: Was Leonardo Ruizpalacios in Qué Pobres Tan Ricos

Diego Miguel de Erice Domínguez (Mexico City, August 9, 1986) is a Mexican actor, director and writer. He is recognized for his participation in the telenovela Qué pobres tan ricos as Leonardo Ruizpalacios in 2014. As an actor, director and theater writer, he is known for his work As Como Quieras... ¡Perro Ámame!

== Filmography ==
Year	Title	Character	Notes
2012	La rosa de Guadalupe	Emmanuel	Season 2, Episode 34: "Las verdaderas pruebas del amor"
2012–2013	Amores verdaderos	Vladimir	Special participation
2013–2014	Qué pobres tan ricos	Leonardo Ruizpalacios Romagnoli de Escandiondas	Supporting role
2013	Como dice el dicho		Season 3, Episode 25: "El que no transa"
2014–2015	La sombra del pasado	Tomás Garcés	Supporting role
2015–2016	Antes muerta que Lichita	Braulio Moncada	Recurring role
2016	Por Siempre Joan Sebastian	Adrián Figueroa González	Mini-series
2017	El bienamado	Dirceo Retana Briceño	Recurring role
2018	Y mañana será otro día	Manuel González	Recurring role
2019	Por amar sin ley	David Aguirre	2 episodes
2022	La herencia	Cornelio Pérez	
2023	Eternamente amándonos	José Juan	
2025	A.mar, donde el amor teje sus redes	Nicolás	

== Theater ==
- Como quieras, ¡perro ámame! (2013)
