= ¿Quién es la máscara? (Mexican TV series) season 2 =

¿Quién es la máscara?
- Season 2
- Hosted by: Omar Chaparro
- Judges: Consuelo Duval; Carlos Rivera; Yuri; Juanpa Zurita
- No. of contestants: 18
- Winner: María León as "Disco Ball"
- Runner-up: Paty Cantú as "Mapache"
- No. of episodes: 10

Release
- Original network: Las Estrellas
- Original release: October 11 – December 13, 2020

Season chronology
- ← Previous; Season 1 Next → Season 3

The second season of ¿Quién es la máscara? premiered on Las Estrellas on October 11, 2020, and ran for 10 episodes. On December 13, 2020, Disco Ball (María León) was declared the winner, and Mapache (singer Paty Cantú) the runner-up.

== Production ==
The second season featured 18 new costumes. Filming of the season began on August 24, 2020. On September 17, 2020, Televisa suspended production on the series after it announced seven COVID-19 cases among its talent and production team in three productions in progress. Two of the cases were panelist Consuelo Duval and host Omar Chaparro. Production resumed on September 28, 2020. Ten episodes were confirmed.

== Panelists and host ==
Season 2 panelists and host

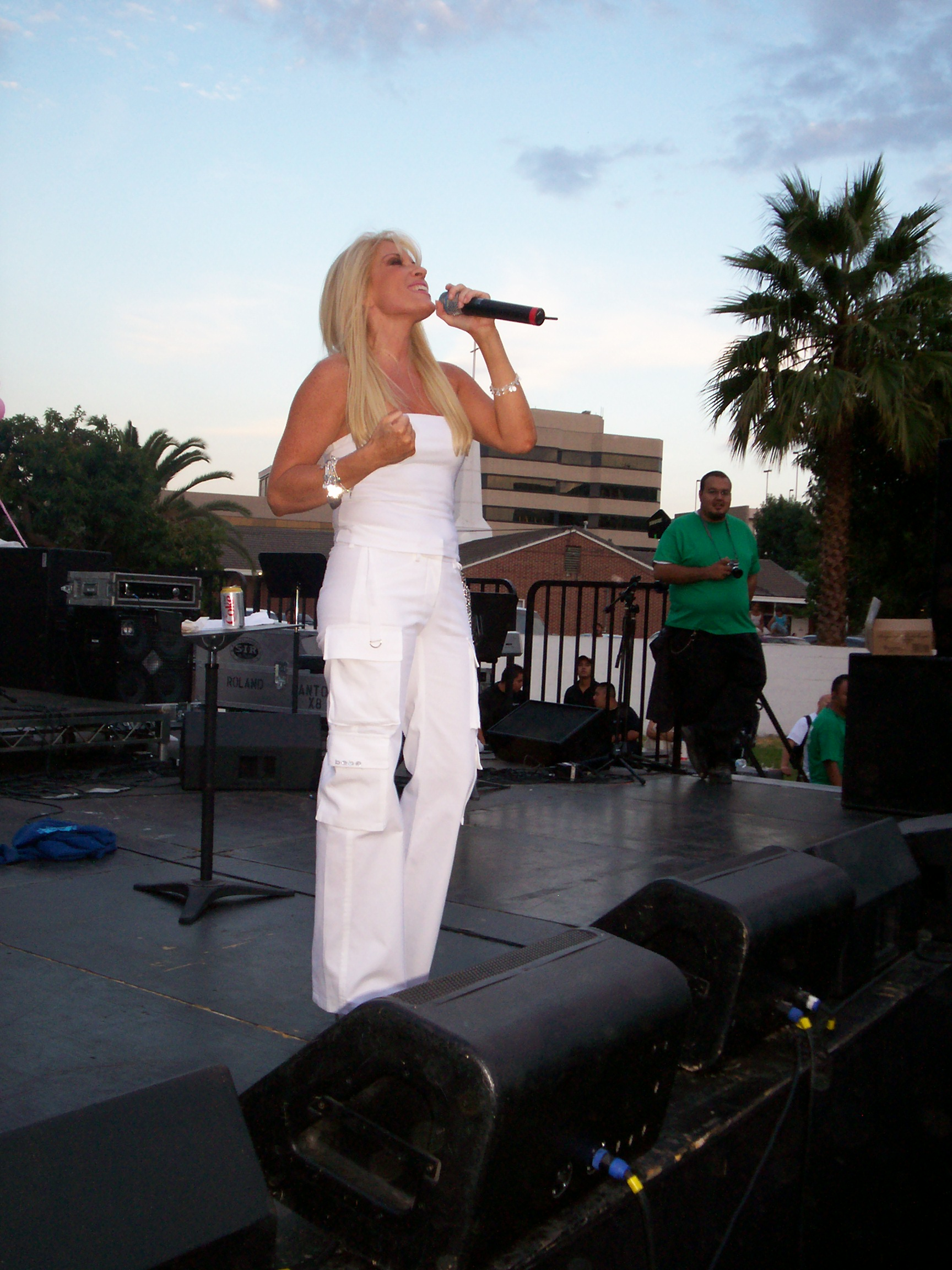
Yuri

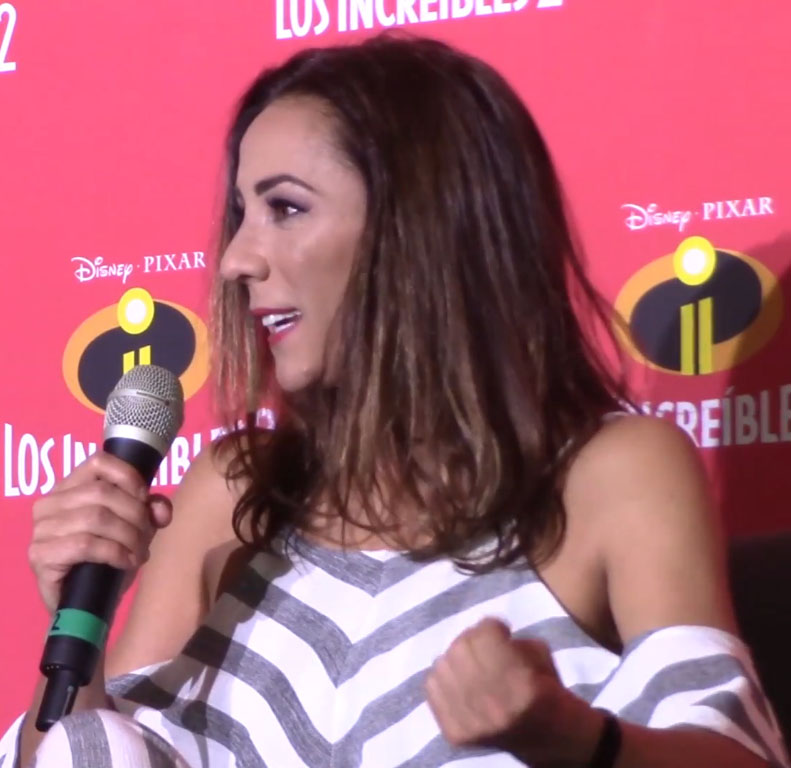
Consuelo Duval

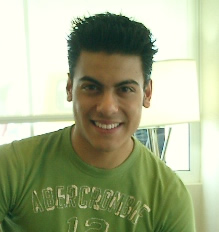
Carlos Rivera

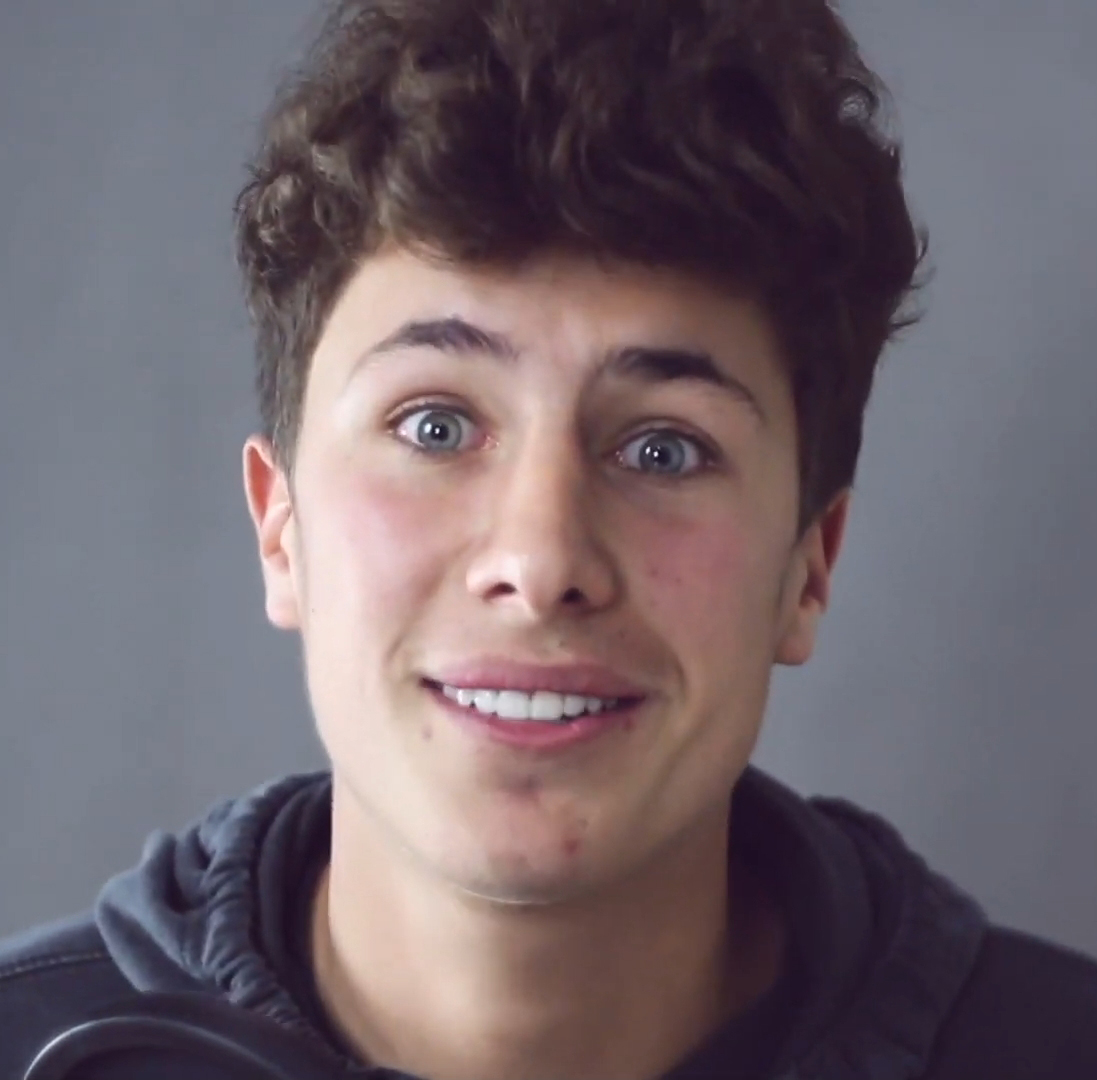
Juanpa Zurita

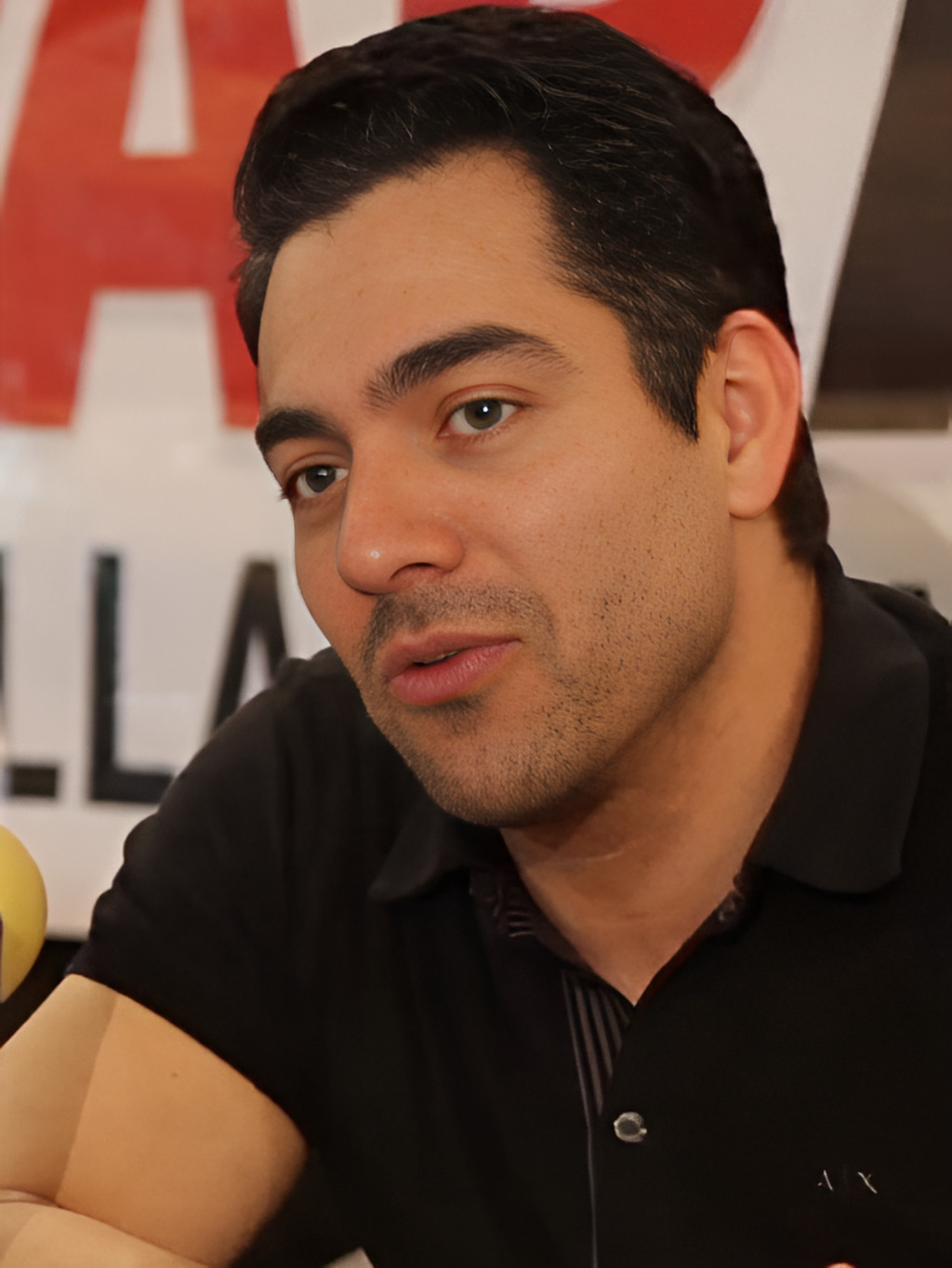
Omar Chaparro

Singer Yuri, actress and comedian Consuelo Duval, and singer Carlos Rivera returned as panelists. Adrián Uribe did not return as a panelist and was replaced by Juanpa Zurita. Omar Chaparro returned as host.

Throughout the season, various guest panelists appeared as the fifth panelist in the panel for one episode. These guest panelists included season 1 contestant Mario Bautista (episode 4), actress Itati Cantoral (episode 5), news anchor Paola Rojas (episode 6), season 2 contestant El Escorpión Dorado (episode 7), television personality Galilea Montijo (episode 8).

== Contestants ==
Results
Stage name	Celebrity	Occupation(s)	Episodes											
Stage name	Celebrity	Occupation(s)	1	2	3	4	5	6	7	8	9		10	
Stage name	Celebrity	Occupation(s)	1	2	3	4	5	6	7	8	A	B	A	B
Disco Ball	María León	Singer	WIN				WIN	SAFE	SAFE	SAFE	SAFE	SAFE	SAFE	WINNER
Mapache	Paty Cantú	Singer		WIN		RISK		SAFE	RISK	SAFE	SAFE	SAFE	SAFE	RUNNER-UP
Oso Polar	Edén Muñoz	Singer			RISK		WIN	SAFE	SAFE	RISK	SAFE	SAFE	THIRD	
Zombie	Jesse Huerta	Singer	WIN			WIN		SAFE	SAFE	SAFE	SAFE	OUT (Note: Zombie was eliminated from the competition in the ninth episode, however he was unmasked in the tenth episode.)		
Elefante	Laura Flores	Actress and singer	RISK			WIN		SAFE	SAFE	SAFE	OUT			
Unicornio	Cassandra Sánchez Navarro	Actress			WIN		RISK	SAFE	RISK	OUT				
Quetzal	Mané de la Parra	Actor and singer			RISK	RISK		RISK	OUT					
Jalapeño	Alan Estrada	Actor			WIN		RISK	OUT						
Cerbero	El Escorpión Dorado	Internet celebrity		RISK			OUT							
Xolo	Arath de la Torre	Actor and comedian		WIN			OUT							
Pantera	Christian Chávez	Actor and singer	RISK			OUT								
Duende	Rommel Pacheco	Olympic Diver		RISK		OUT								
Tortuga	Braulio Luna	Retired footballer			OUT									
Lele	Nath Campos	Influencer			OUT									
Medusa	Dulce	Singer		OUT										
Banana	Marjorie de Sousa	Actress		OUT										
Ratón	Mariana Seoane	Actress and singer	OUT											
Monstruo	Poncho de Nigris	Actor and TV host	OUT											

The masked singer won their face-off and remained in the competition.
The masked singer lost their face-off, but was not eliminated.
The masked singer was safe from elimination.
The masked singer was eliminated from the competition.
The masked singer did not perform.
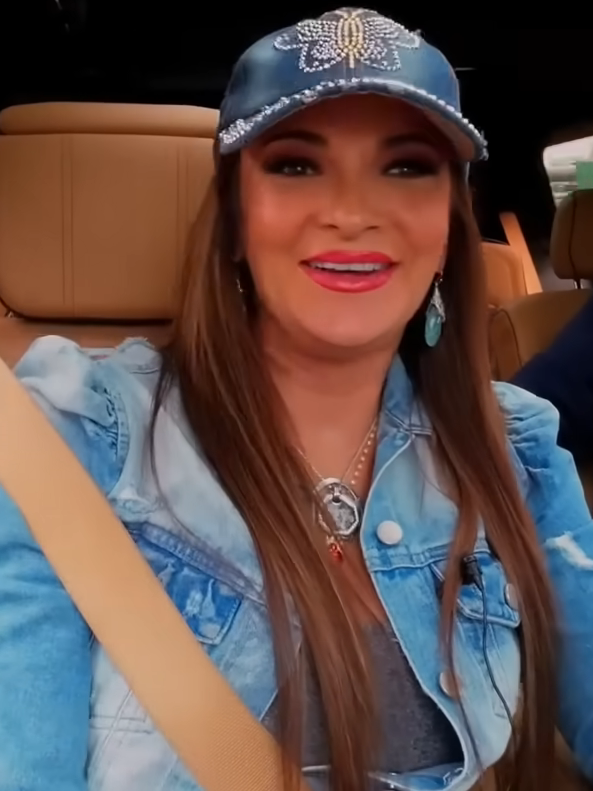
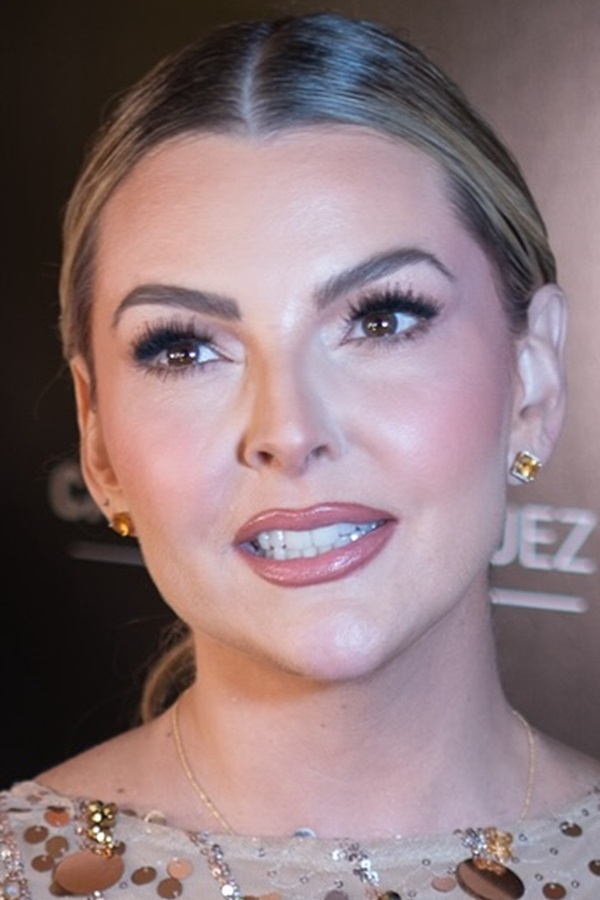
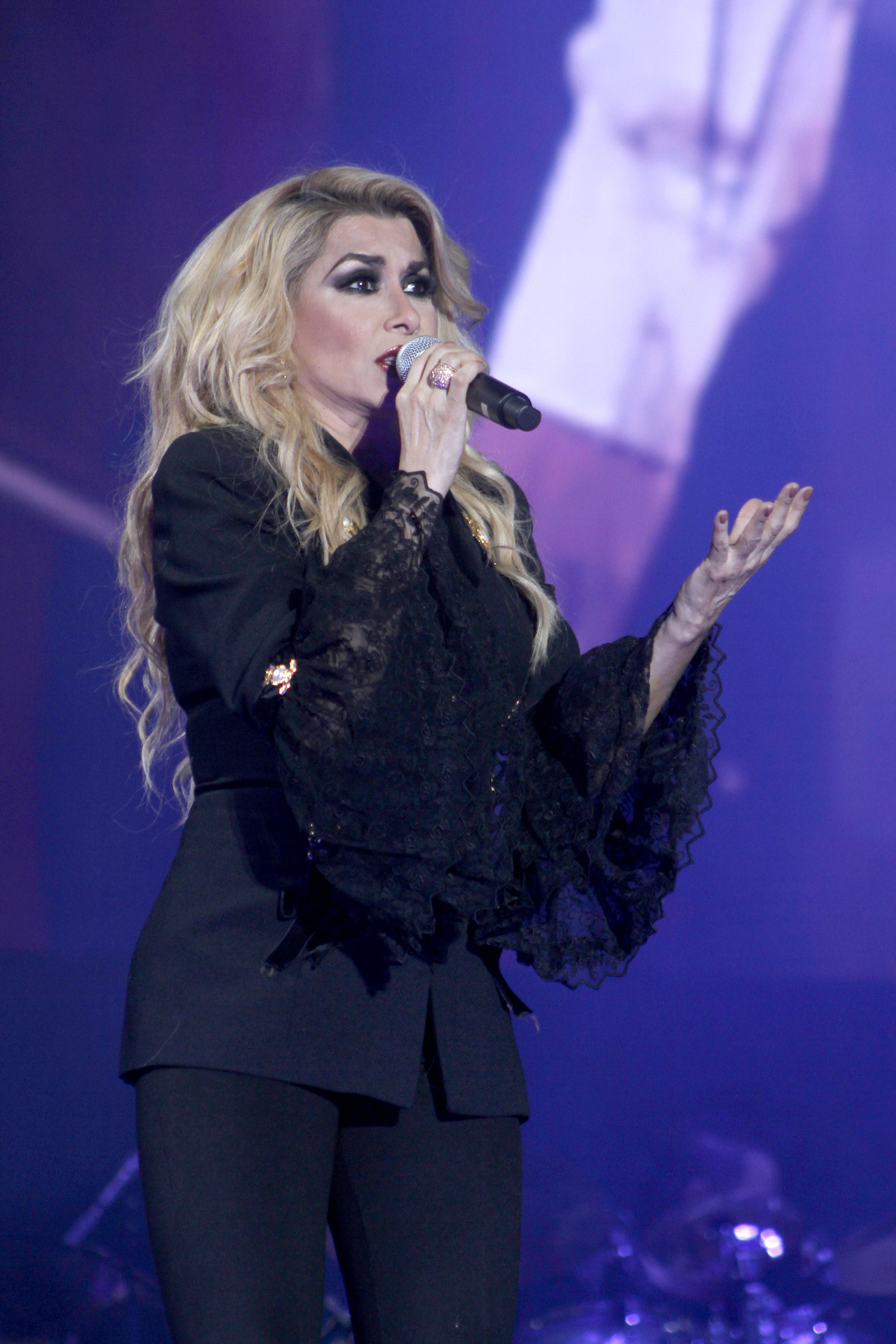
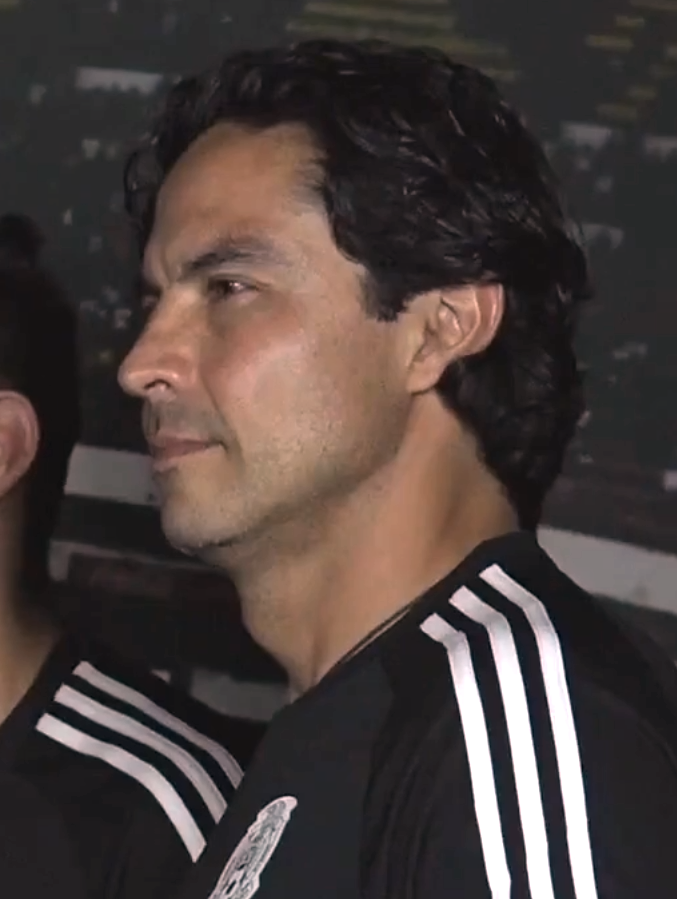
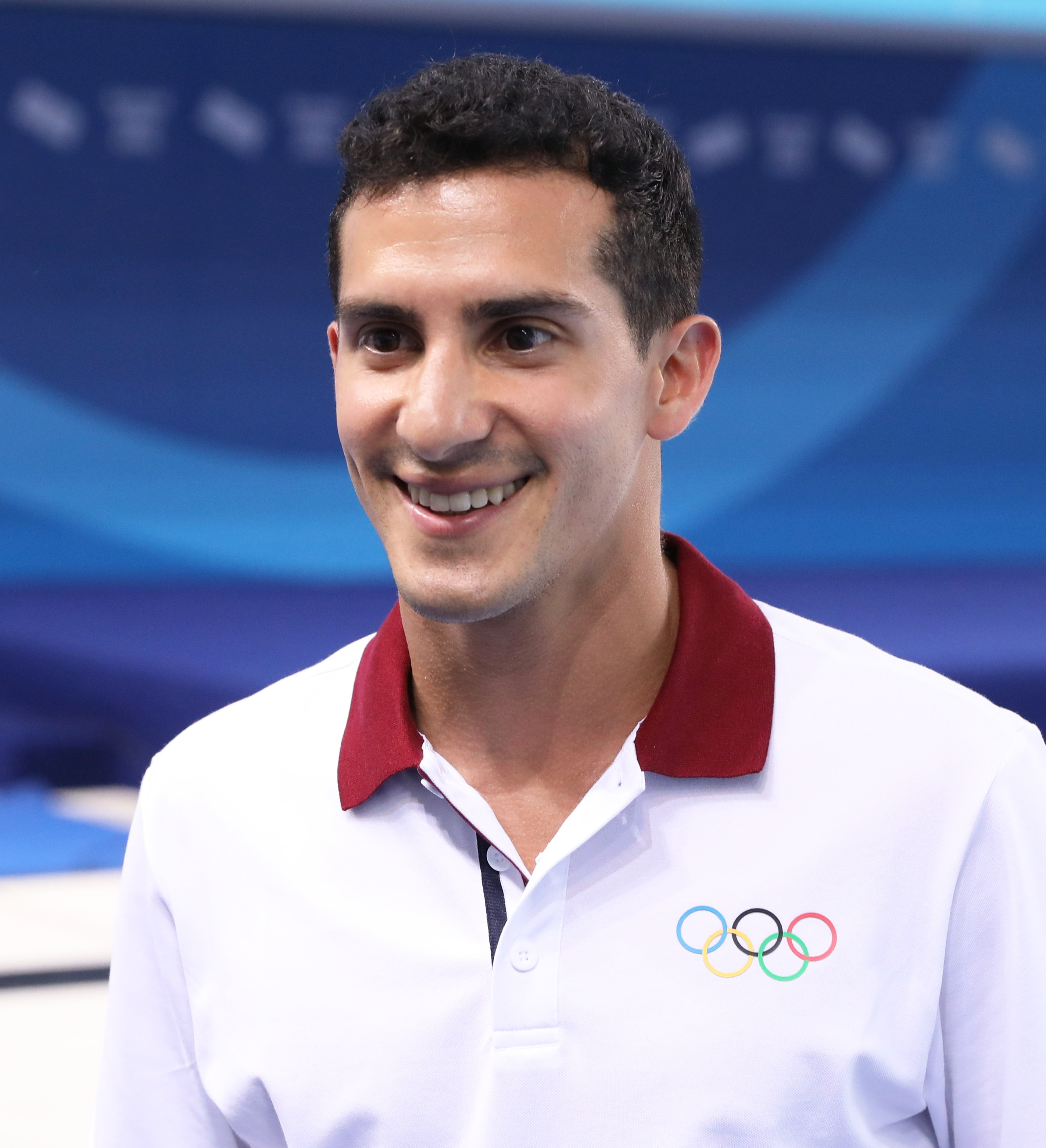
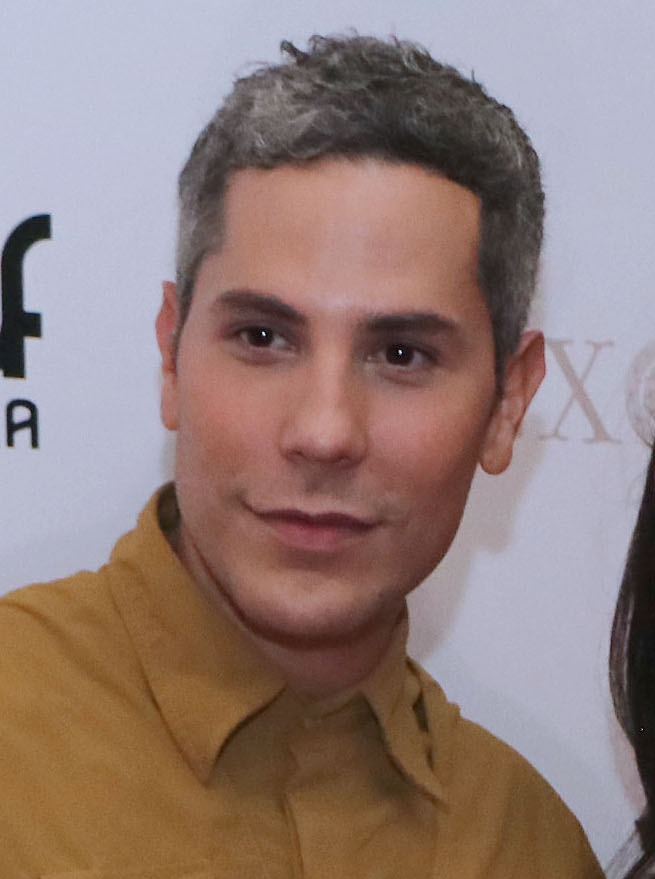
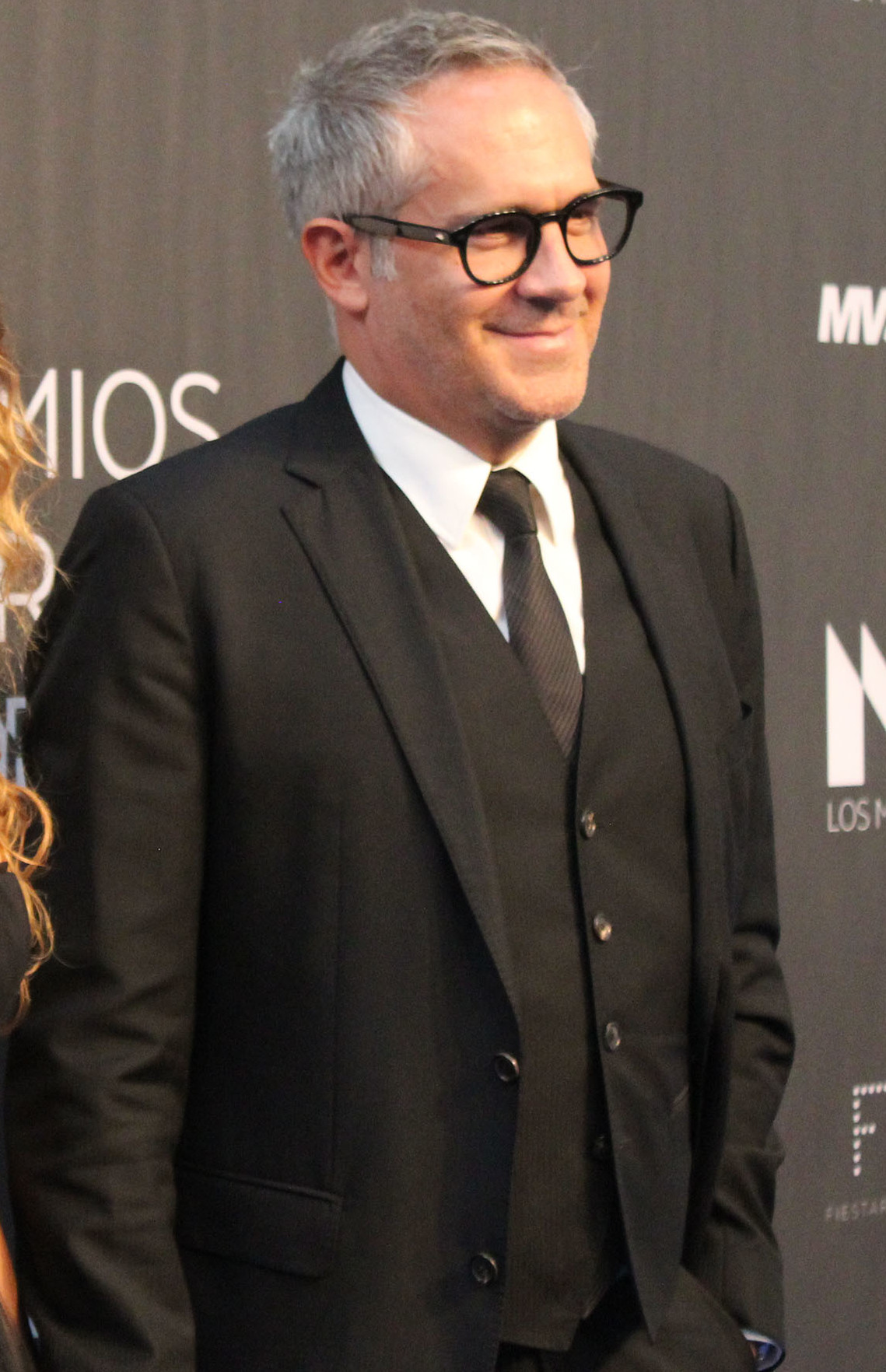
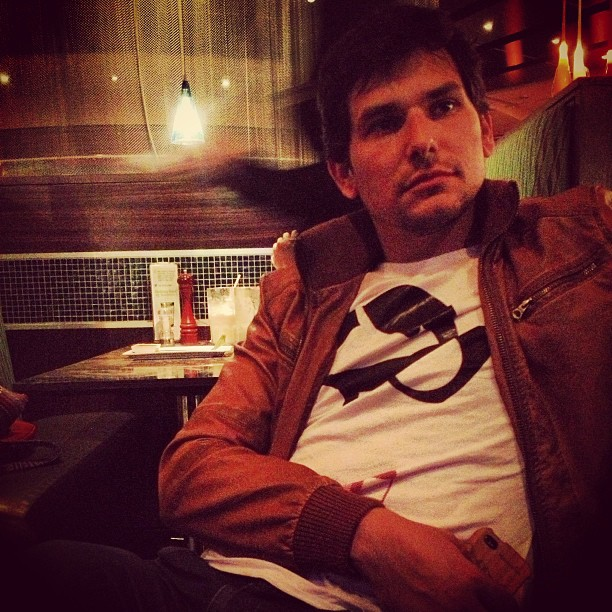
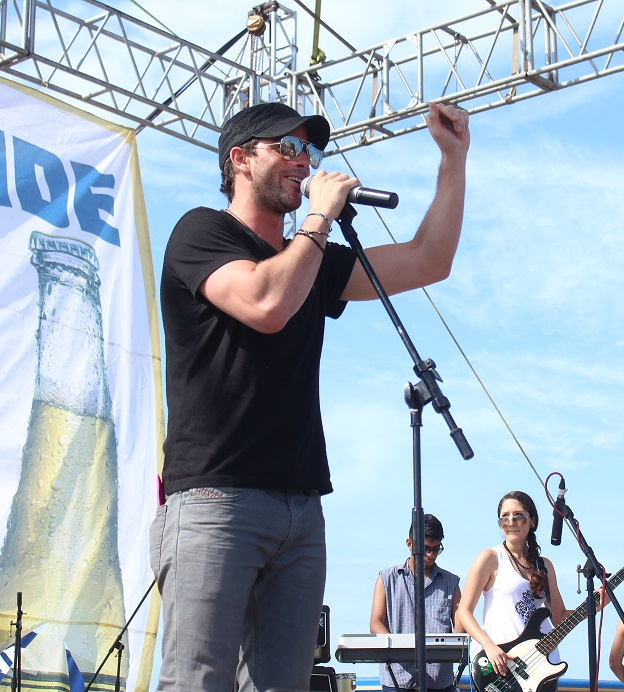
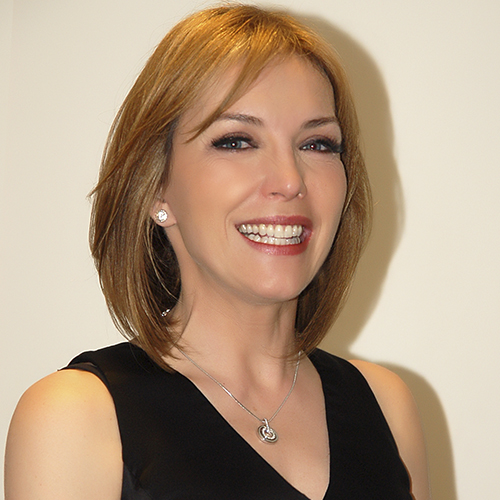
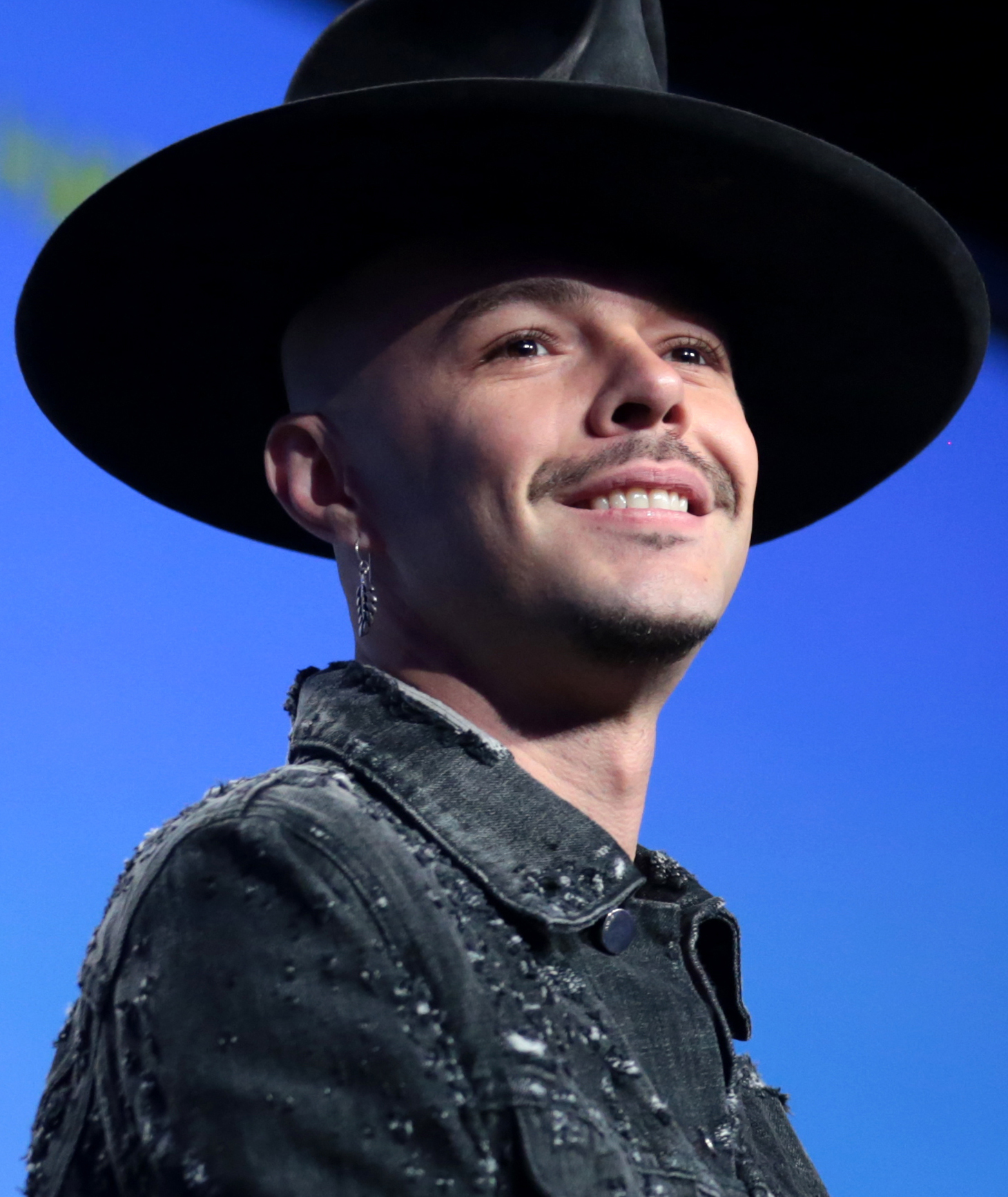
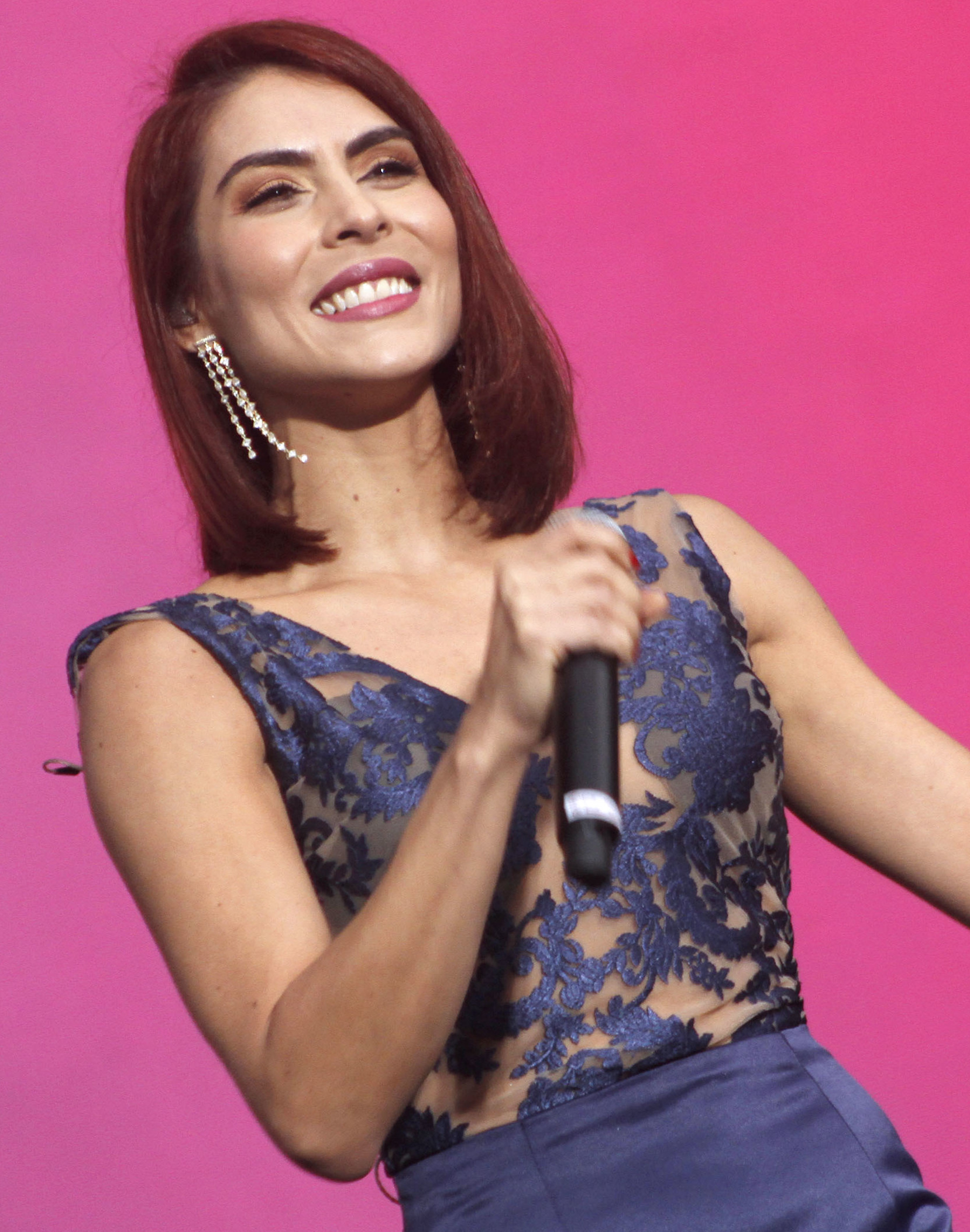
The celebrities who competed in the second season of ¿Quién es la máscara?, pictured in order of elimination (L-R):
Mariana Seoane ("Ratón"), Marjorie de Sousa ("Banana"), Dulce ("Medusa"), Braulio Luna ("Tortuga"), Rommel Pacheco ("Duende"), Christian Chávez ("Pantera"), Arath de la Torre ("Xolo"), El Escorpión Dorado ("Cerbero"), Alan Estrada ("Jalapeño"), Mané de la Parra ("Quetzal"), Cassandra Sánchez Navarro ("Unicornio"), Laura Flores ("Elefante"), Jesse Huerta ("Zombie"), Paty Cantú ("Mapache"), and María León ("Disco Ball")
Not pictured: Poncho de Nigris ("Monstruo"), Nath Campos ("Lele"), and Edén Muñoz ("Oso Polar")

== Episodes ==
=== Week 1 (October 11) ===
Performances on the first episode
#	Stage name	Song	Identity	Result
1	Zombie	"Que Maldición" by Banda MS ft. Snoop Dogg	undisclosed	WIN
2	Monstruo	"Tutu" by Camilo	Poncho de Nigris	OUT
3	Elefante	"Savage Love" by Jason Derulo	undisclosed	RISK
4	Disco Ball	"Tusa" by Karol G	undisclosed	WIN
5	Ratón	"Break My Heart" by Dua Lipa	Mariana Seoane	OUT
6	Pantera	"Ojala Que Te Mueras" by Pesado	undisclosed	RISK

=== Week 2 (October 18) ===
Performances on the second episode
#	Stage name	Song	Identity	Result
1	Banana	"Banana" by Garibaldi	Marjorie de Sousa	OUT
2	Duende	"Amorfoda" by Bad Bunny	undisclosed	RISK
3	Xolo	"Welcome to the Jungle" by Guns N' Roses	undisclosed	WIN
4	Medusa	"Desde Esa Noche" by Thalía ft. Maluma	Dulce	OUT
5	Cerbero	"Yo Perreo Sola" by Bad Bunny	undisclosed	RISK
6	Mapache	"Bad Guy" by Billie Eilish	undisclosed	WIN

=== Week 3 (October 25) ===
Performances on the third episode
#	Stage name	Song	Identity	Result
1	Jalapeño	"Favorito" by Camilo	undisclosed	WIN
2	Quetzal	"Cinco Minutos" by Gloria Trevi	undisclosed	RISK
3	Lele	"Traicionera" by Sebastián Yatra	Nath Campos	OUT
4	Tortuga	"El Listón de tu Pelo" by Los Ángeles Azules	Braulio Luna	OUT
5	Unicornio	"Say So" by Doja Cat	undisclosed	WIN
6	Oso Polar	"El Chico del Apartamento 512" by Selena	undisclosed	RISK

=== Week 4 (November 1) ===
- Group number: "No Es Serio Este Cementerio" by Mecano

Performances on the fourth episode
#	Stage name	Song	Result	
Round One
1	Mapache	"Amor Prohibido" by Selena	RISK	
2	Elefante	"Fuego" by Bomba Estéreo	WIN	
3	Duende	"Cómo Te Atreves" by Morat	RISK	
Máscara vs. Máscara			Identity	Result
1	Duende	"Criminal" by Natti Natasha & Ozuna	Rommel Pacheco	OUT
1	Mapache	"Criminal" by Natti Natasha & Ozuna	undisclosed	SAFE
Round Two
4	Quetzal	"Dance Monkey" by Tones and I	RISK	
5	Zombie	"Ritmo (Bad Boys for Life)" by Black Eyed Peas & J Balvin	WIN	
6	Pantera	"Atrévete-te-te" by Calle 13	RISK	
Máscara vs. Máscara			Identity	Result
1	Pantera	"Vente Pa' Ca" by Ricky Martin ft. Maluma	Christian Chávez	OUT
1	Quetzal	"Vente Pa' Ca" by Ricky Martin ft. Maluma	undisclosed	SAFE

=== Week 5 (November 8) ===
Performances on the fifth episode
#	Stage name	Song	Result	
Round One
1	Unicornio	"Rolling in the Deep" by Adele	RISK	
2	Oso Polar	"Burbujas de Amor" by Juan Luis Guerra	WIN	
3	Xolo	"For Sale" by Carlos Vives & Alejandro Sanz	RISK	
Máscara vs. Máscara			Identity	Result
1	Xolo	"Inolvidable" by Jenni Rivera	Arath de la Torre	OUT
1	Unicornio	"Inolvidable" by Jenni Rivera	undisclosed	SAFE
Round Two
4	Disco Ball	"Blinding Lights" by The Weeknd	WIN	
5	Cerbero	"The Fox (What Does the Fox Say?)" by Ylvis	RISK	
6	Jalapeño	"Tantita Pena" by Alejandro Fernández	RISK	
Máscara vs. Máscara			Identity	Result
1	Cerbero	"Vuela más alto" by OV7	El Escorpión Dorado	OUT
1	Jalapeño	"Vuela más alto" by OV7	undisclosed	SAFE

=== Week 6 (November 15) ===
Performances on the sixth episode
#	Stage name	Song	Identity	Result
1	Unicornio	"Con Altura" by Rosalía, J Balvin and El Guincho	undisclosed	SAFE
2	Mapache	"Attention" by Charlie Puth	undisclosed	SAFE
3	Jalapeño	"Será Que No Me Amas" by Luis Miguel	Alan Estrada	OUT
4	Zombie	"No Se Me Quita" by Maluma ft. Ricky Martin	undisclosed	SAFE
5	Oso Polar	"Que Tire Pa Lante" by Daddy Yankee	undisclosed	SAFE
6	Disco Ball	"I Will Survive" by Gloria Gaynor	undisclosed	SAFE
7	Quetzal	"Hawái" by Maluma	undisclosed	RISK
8	Elefante	"La Gozadera" by Gente de Zona ft. Marc Anthony	undisclosed	SAFE

=== Week 7 (November 22) ===
Performances on the seventh episode
#	Stage name	Song	Identity	Result
1	Unicornio	"Wrecking Ball" by Miley Cyrus	undisclosed	RISK
2	Elefante	"Happy" by Pharrell Williams	undisclosed	SAFE
3	Quetzal	"El Triste" by José José	Mane de la Parra	OUT
4	Disco Ball	"Rain on Me" by Lady Gaga and Ariana Grande	undisclosed	SAFE
5	Mapache	"Inevitable" by Shakira	undisclosed	RISK
6	Oso Polar	"Nunca Es Suficiente" by Los Ángeles Azules	undisclosed	SAFE
7	Zombie	"Andas en Mi Cabeza" by Chino & Nacho ft. Daddy Yankee	undisclosed	SAFE

=== Week 8 (November 29) ===
Performances on the eighth episode
#	Stage name	Song	Identity	Result
1	Disco Ball	"Pégate" by Ricky Martin	undisclosed	SAFE
2	Unicornio	"Yo Soy Tu Amigo Fiel" from Toy Story	Cassandra Sánchez Navarro	OUT
3	Mapache	"Mis Ojos Lloran Por Ti" by Big Boy ft. Angel Lopez	undisclosed	SAFE
4	Zombie	"Dura" by Daddy Yankee	undisclosed	SAFE
5	Elefante	"Reina de Corazones" by Alejandra Guzmán	undisclosed	SAFE
6	Oso Polar	"X" by Nicky Jam and J Balvin	undisclosed	RISK

=== Week 9 (December 6) ===
Performances on the ninth episode
#	Stage name	Song	Identity	Result
Round One
1	Zombie	"Hermosa Experiencia" by Banda MS	undisclosed	SAFE
2	Disco Ball	"Bang Bang" by Jessie J, Ariana Grande and Nicki Minaj	undisclosed	SAFE
3	Oso Polar	"Bailando" by Enrique Iglesias	undisclosed	SAFE
4	Mapache	"Tatuajes" by Joan Sebastian	undisclosed	SAFE
5	Elefante	"Don't Stop Believin'" by Journey	Laura Flores	OUT
Round Two
6	Oso Polar	"Suave" by Luis Miguel	undisclosed	SAFE
7	Zombie	"Callaíta" by Bad Bunny ft. Tainy	Jesse Huerta	OUT
8	Disco Ball	"ADMV" by Maluma	undisclosed	SAFE
9	Mapache	"Toxic" by Britney Spears	undisclosed	SAFE

=== Week 10 (December 13) ===
- Group number: "All I Want for Christmas Is You" by Mariah Carey

Performances on the tenth episode
#	Stage name	Song	Identity	Result
Round One
1	Disco Ball	"Lady Marmalade" by Christina Aguilera, Lil' Kim, Mýa and Pink	undisclosed	SAFE
2	Oso Polar	"A Través Del Vaso" by Banda Los Sebastianes	Edén Muñoz	THIRD
3	Mapache	"Like a Virgin" by Madonna	undisclosed	SAFE
Round Two
1	Disco Ball	"OUCH" by Mau y Ricky	María León	WINNER
2	Mapache	"Tequila" by Mario Bautista, Aldo Trujillo, Uzielito Mix, and Edwin Luna y La Trakalosa de Monterrey	Paty Cantú	RUNNER-UP

== Ratings ==
Show	Episode	Air date	Timeslot (CT)	Viewers (millions)
1	"Noche de presentaciones"	October 11, 2020	Sunday; 8:30 p.m.	3.8
2	"Confusión por partida doble"	October 18, 2020	Sunday; 8:30 p.m.	4.2
3	"Noche de muchas más sorpresas"	October 25, 2020	Sunday; 8:30 p.m.	3.8
4	"Máscara contra máscara"	November 1, 2020	Sunday; 8:30 p.m.	3.3
5	"Pelea por mi máscara"	November 8, 2020	Sunday; 8:30 p.m.	4.4
6	"Todos sobre el escenario"	November 15, 2020	Sunday; 8:30 p.m.	3.8
7	"El Escorpión Dorado hace enloquecer a todos"	November 22, 2020	Sunday; 8:30 p.m.	3.9
8	"Galilea Montijo estelariza el domingo de locura"	November 29, 2020	Sunday; 8:30 p.m.	3.4
9	"La semifinal"	December 6, 2020	Sunday; 8:30 p.m.	4.0
10	"Gran final"	December 13, 2020	Sunday; 8:00 p.m.	3.9
