= ¿Quién es la máscara? (Mexican TV series) season 3 =

¿Quién es la máscara?
- Season 3
- Hosted by: Adrián Uribe
- Judges: Carlos Rivera; Juanpa Zurita; Mónica Huarte; Yuri
- No. of contestants: 18
- Winner: Kalimba as "Apache"
- Runner-up: Gala Montes as "Gitana"
- No. of episodes: 10

Release
- Original network: Las Estrellas
- Original release: October 10 – December 19, 2021

Season chronology
- ← Previous; Season 2 Next → Season 4

The third season of the Mexican television series ¿Quién es la máscara? premiered on Las Estrellas on October 10, 2021. On December 19, 2021, Apache (Actor and singer Kalimba) was declared the winner, and Gitana (Actress and singer Gala Montes) the runner-up.

== Panelists and host ==
Season 3 panelists and host

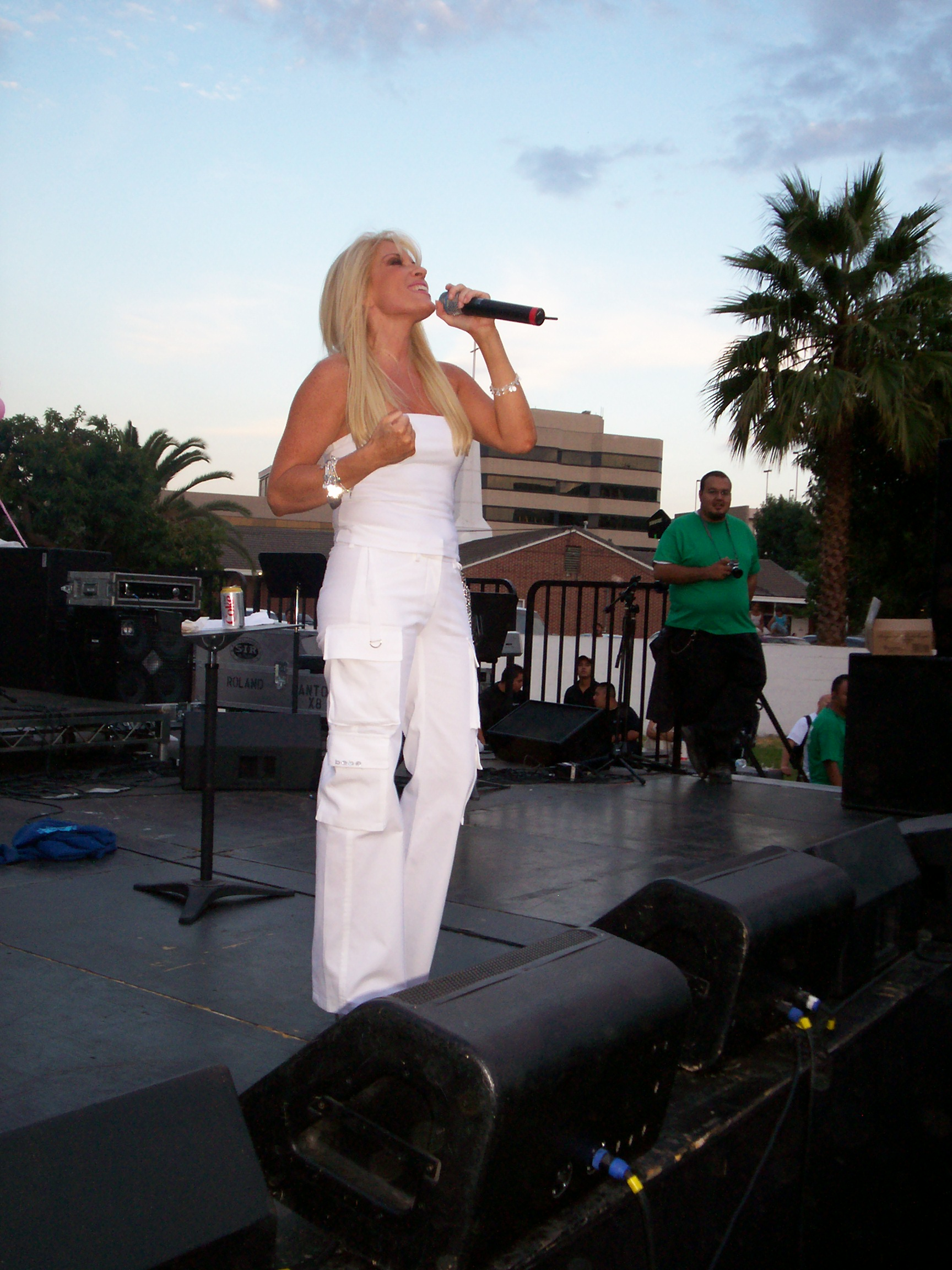
Yuri

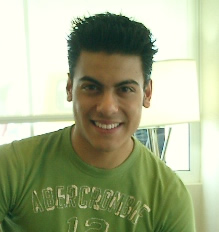
Carlos Rivera

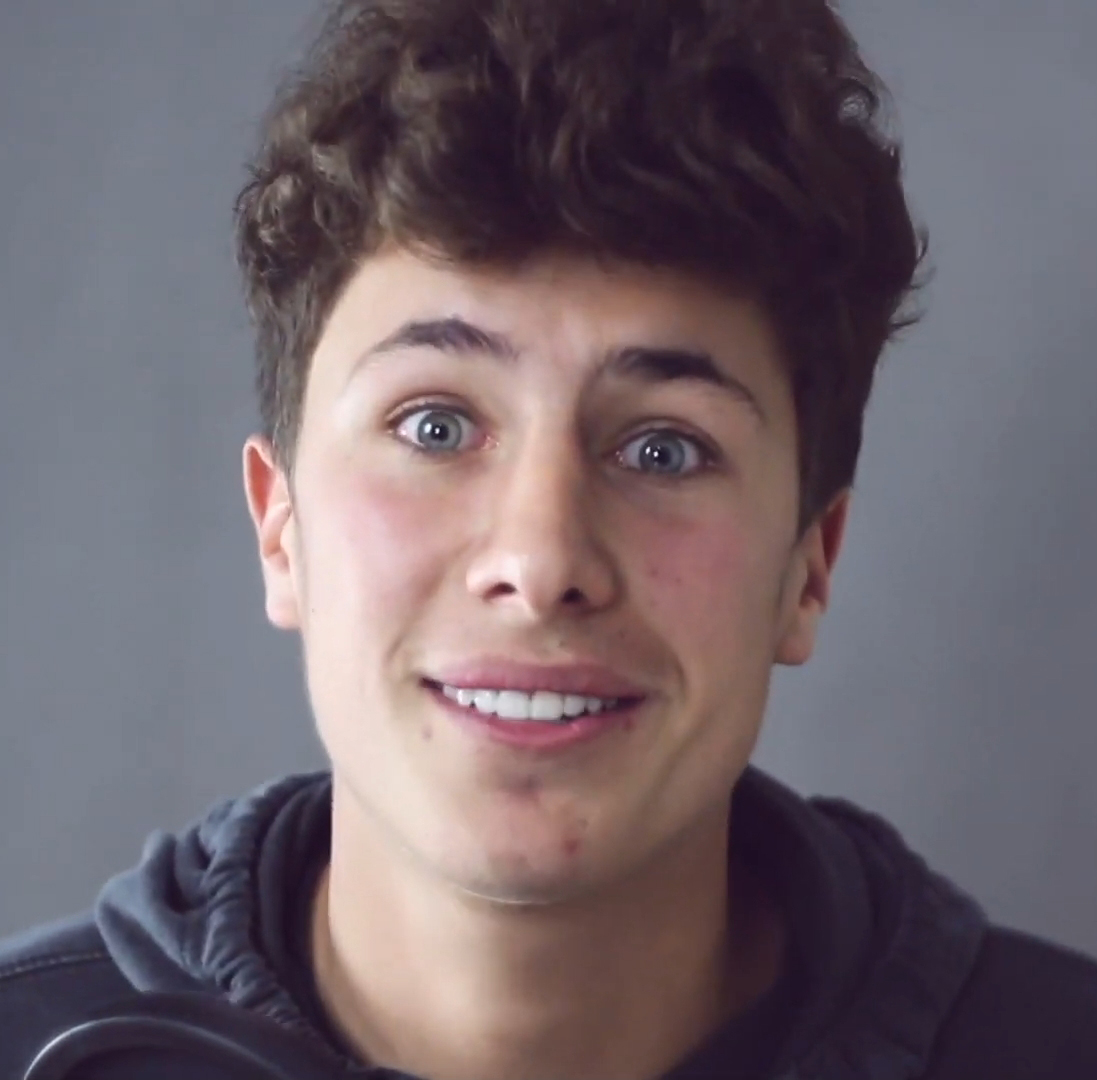
Juanpa Zurita

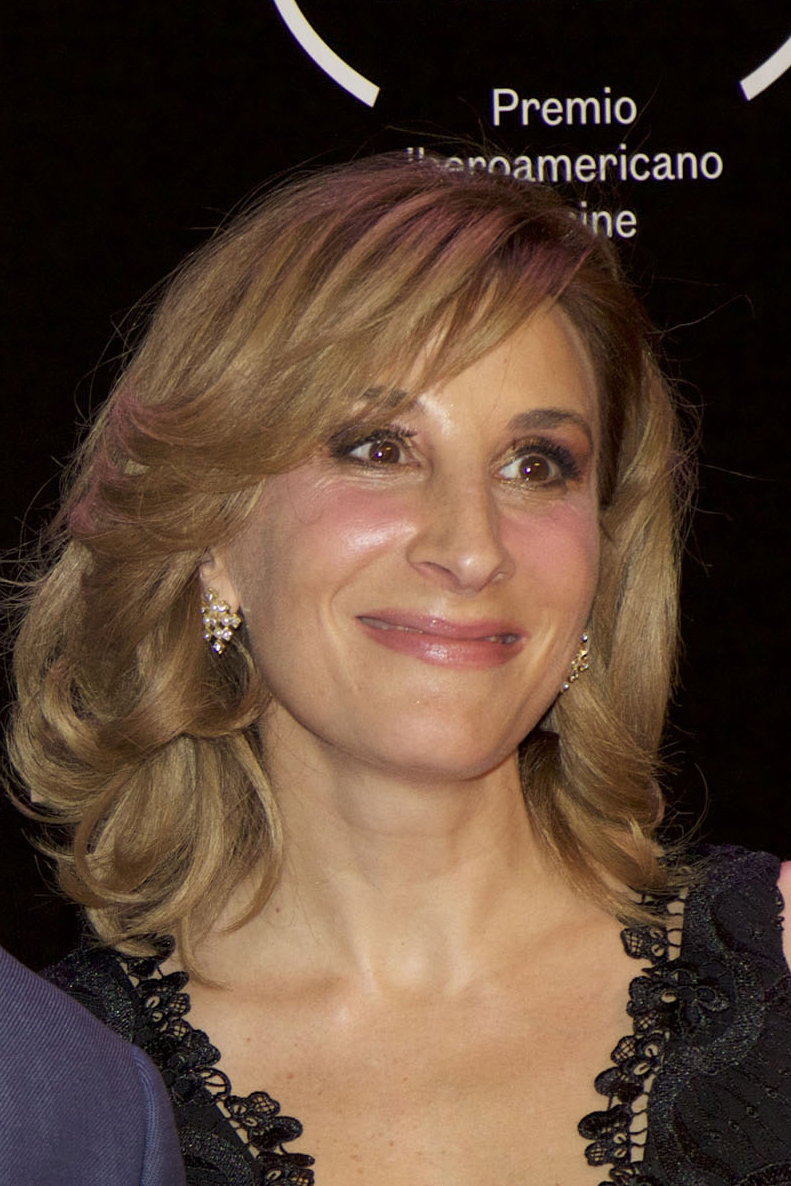
Mónica Huarte

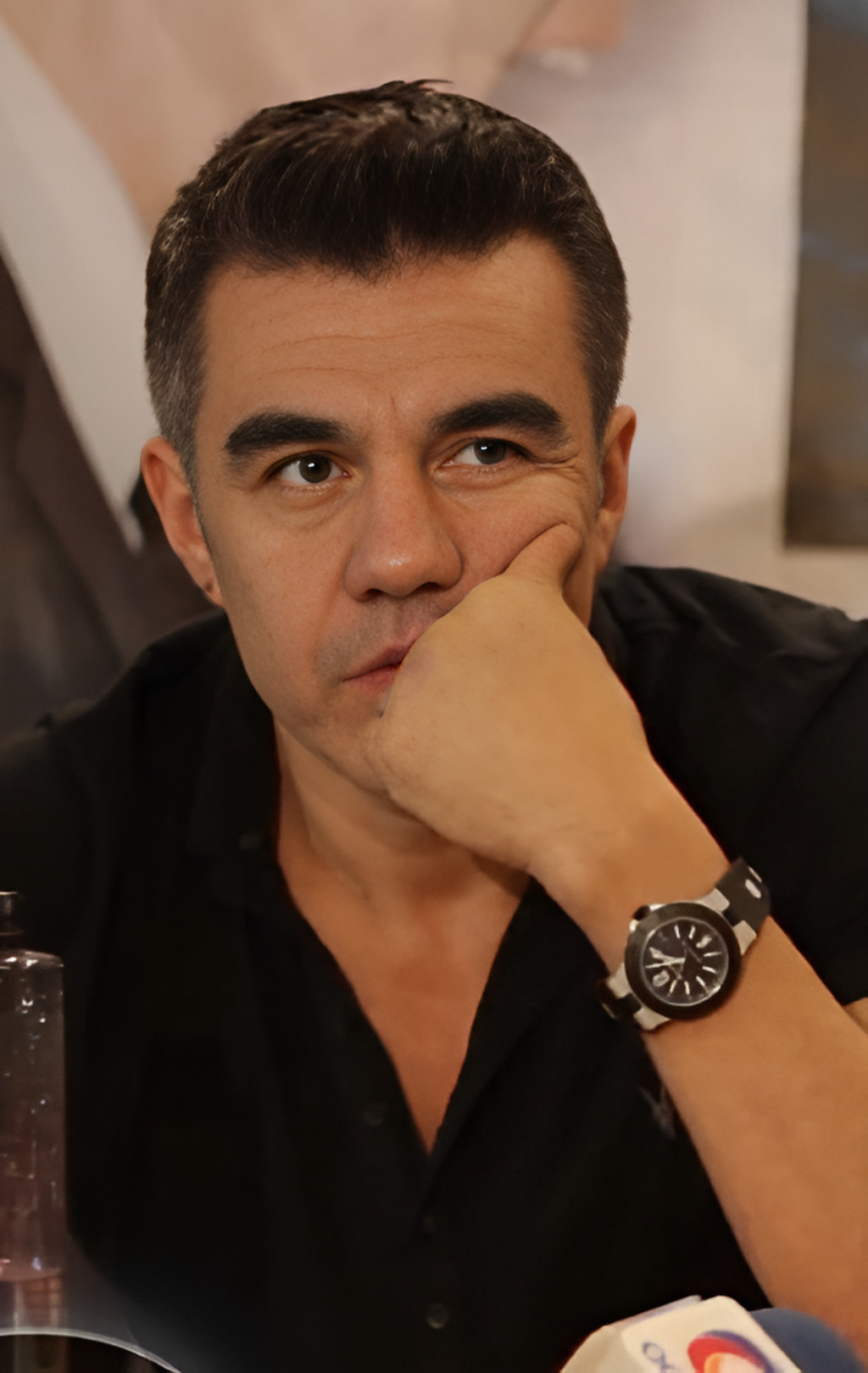
Adrián Uribe

Singer Yuri, singer Carlos Rivera, and social media influencer Juanpa Zurita returned as panelists. Consuelo Duval did not return as a panelist and was replaced by Mónica Huarte. Omar Chaparro did not return as host and was replaced by season 1 panelist Adrián Uribe.

Throughout the season, various guest panelists appeared as the fifth panelist in the panel for one episode. These guest panelists included former host Omar Chaparro (episode 1), season 1 winner Vadhir Derbez (episode 4), season 2 winner María León (episode 5), actress Erika Buenfil (episode 6), and season 3 contestant Lorena Herrera (episode 7).

== Contestants ==
This season features a non-contestant masked character called Hombre de Piedra (Stone Man), beginning in the seventh episode and ending in the tenth episode where they were unmasked to be revealed as singer Gloria Trevi.

Results
Stage name	Celebrity	Occupation(s)	Episodes											
Stage name	Celebrity	Occupation(s)	1	2	3	4	5	6	7	8	9		10	
Stage name	Celebrity	Occupation(s)	1	2	3	4	5	6	7	8	A	B	A	B
Apache	Kalimba	Actor and singer		WIN		WIN		SAFE	SAFE	SAFE	SAFE	SAFE	SAFE	WINNER
Gitana	Gala Montes	Actress and singer			RISK	RISK		SAFE	SAFE	SAFE	SAFE	SAFE	SAFE	RUNNER-UP
La Hueva	Emilio Osorio	Actor and singer	RISK			RISK		SAFE	SAFE	SAFE	SAFE	SAFE	THIRD	
Perezoso	Erik Rubín	Singer		WIN			WIN	SAFE	SAFE	RISK	SAFE	OUT		
Carnívora	Tatiana	Singer	WIN			WIN		RISK	RISK	SAFE	OUT			
Androide	Sandra Echeverría	Actress and singer		RISK			RISK	SAFE	SAFE	OUT				
Leona	Dulce María	Actress and Singer			WIN		WIN	SAFE	OUT					
Sapo	Noel Schajris	Singer	WIN				RISK	OUT						
Búho	Carlos Ponce	Actor and singer	RISK				OUT							
Monstruo de las Nieves	María del Sol	Singer			WIN		OUT							
Sirena	Lorena Herrera	Actress and singer			RISK	OUT								
Jocho	Emmanuel Palomares	Actor		RISK		OUT								
Zarigüeya	Faisy	Actor and presenter			OUT									
Hormiga Reina	Adriana Monsalve	Journalist			OUT									
Caperuza	Kunno	Influencer		OUT										
Perro	Ricardo López	Retired boxer		OUT										
Caracol	Paola Espinosa	Olympic Diver	OUT											
Brócoli	Mauricio Garza	Actor	OUT											

The masked singer won their face-off and remained in the competition.
The masked singer lost their face-off, but was not eliminated.
The masked singer was safe from elimination.
The masked singer was eliminated from the competition.
The masked singer did not perform.
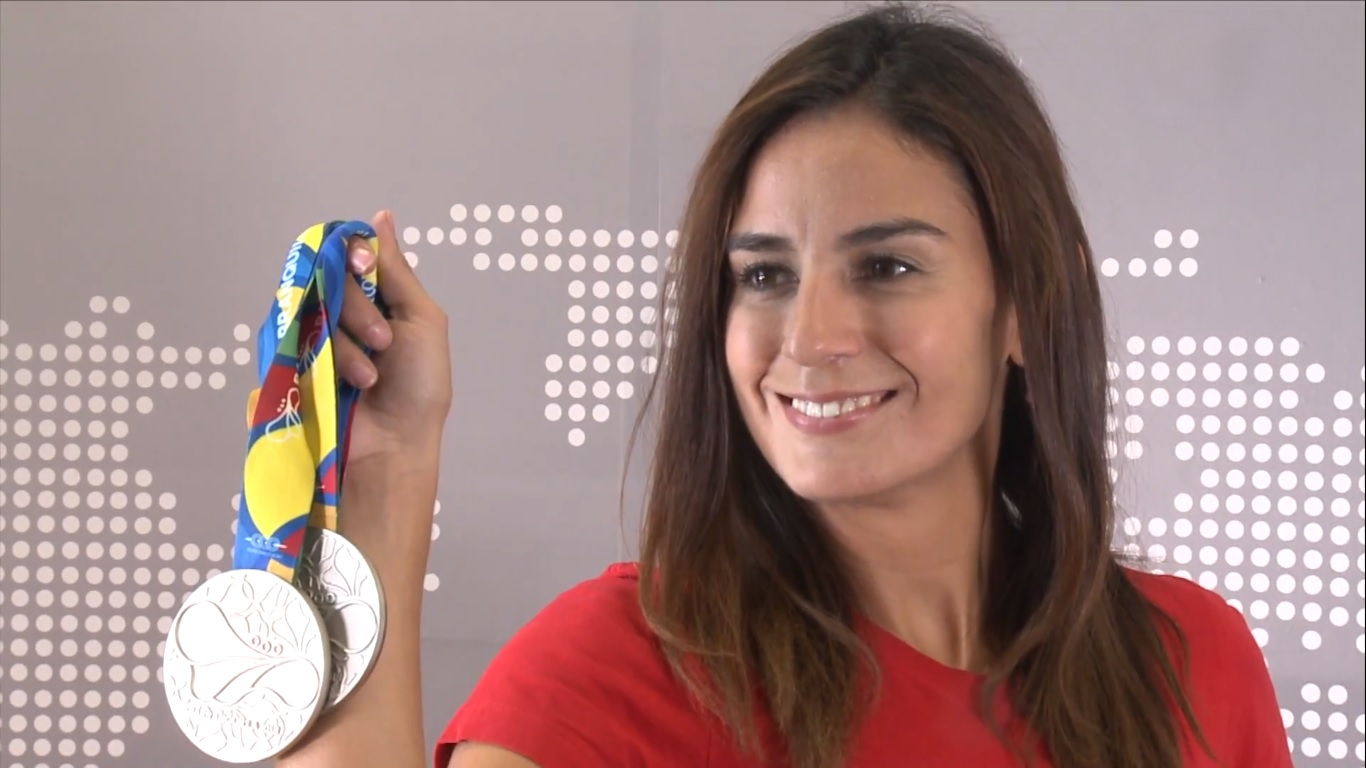
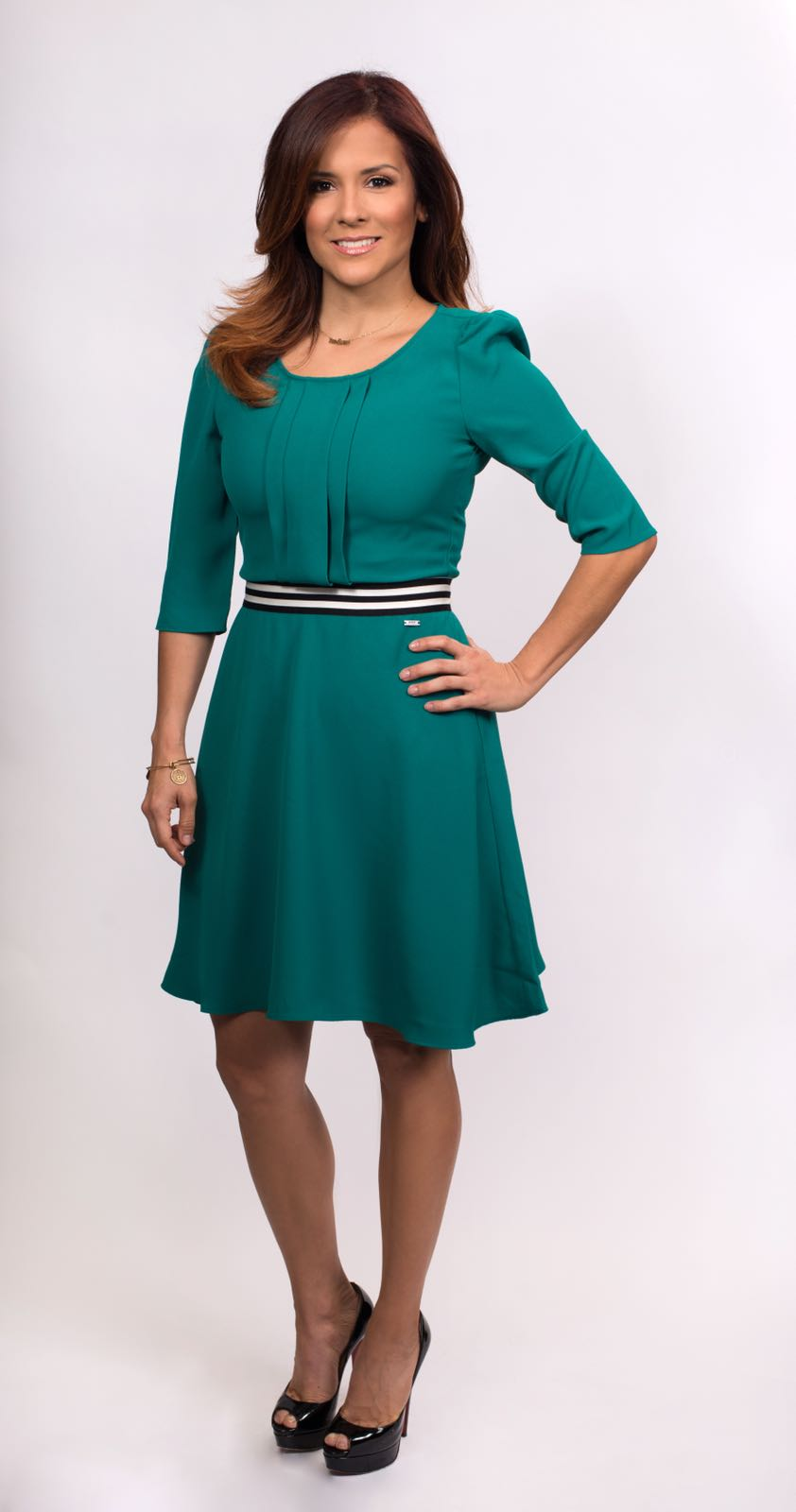
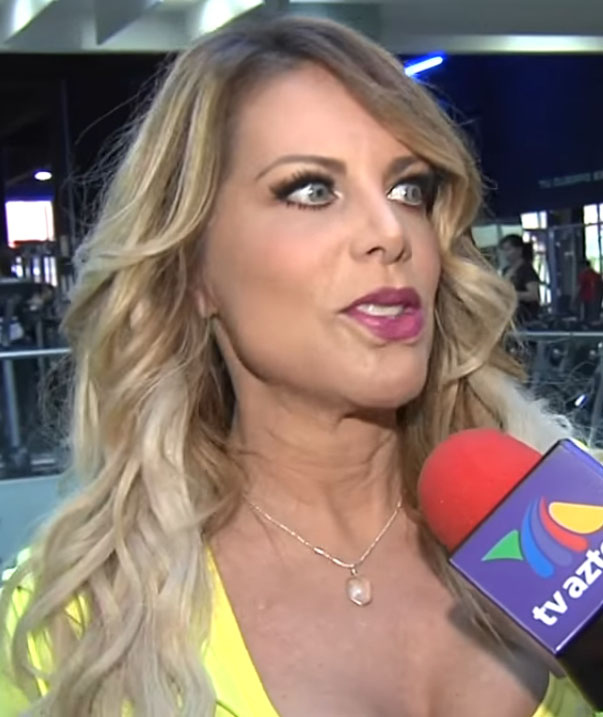
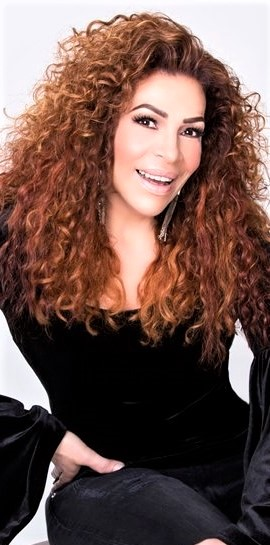
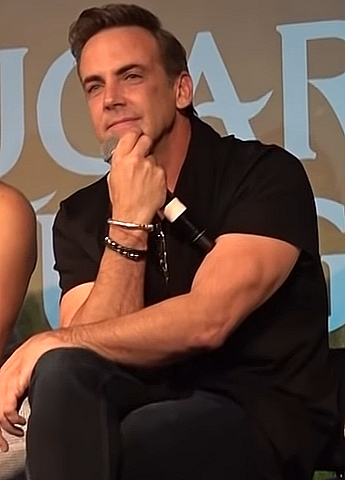
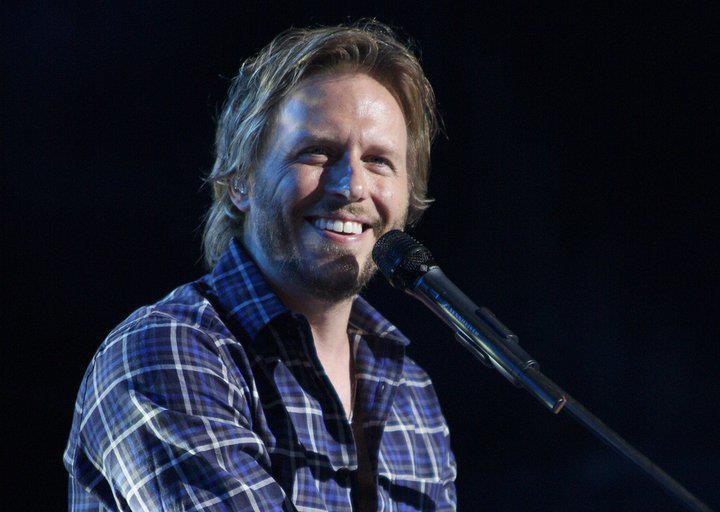
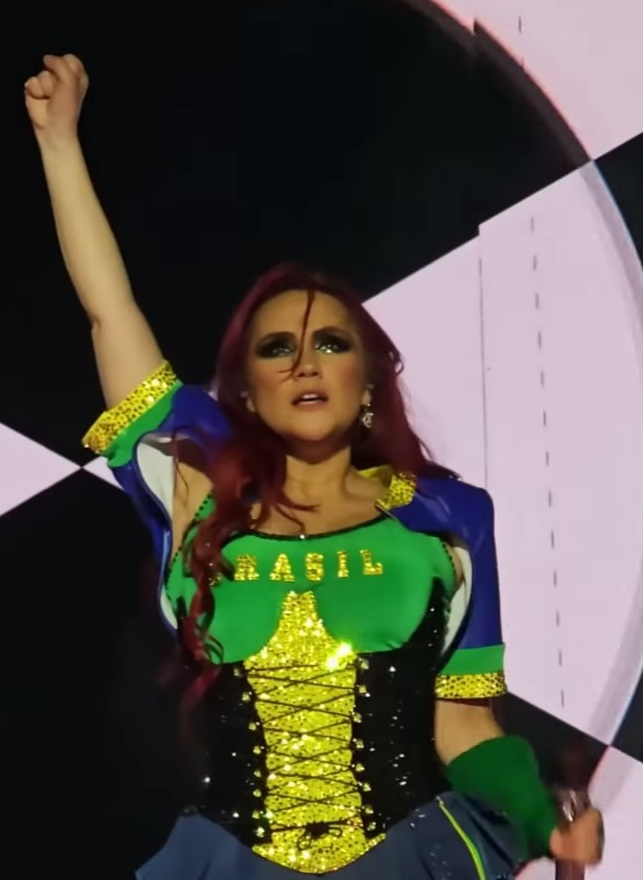
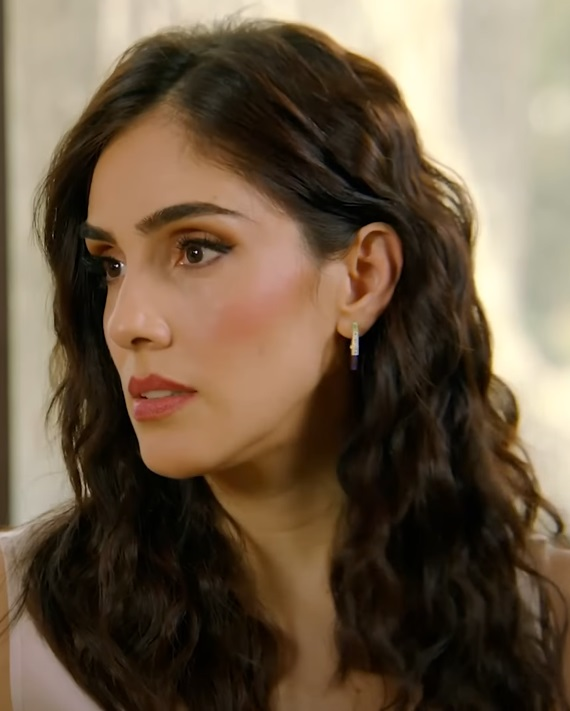
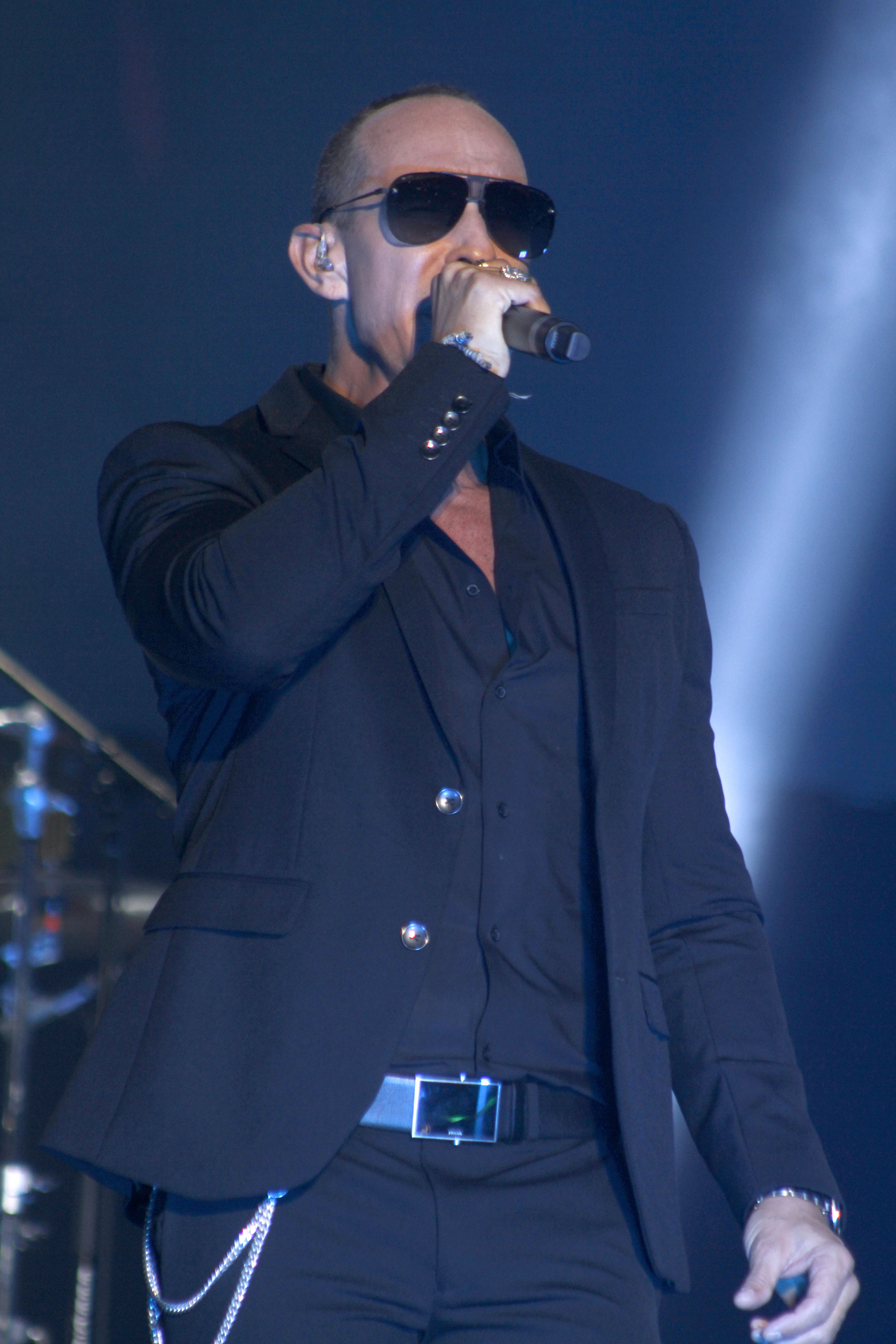
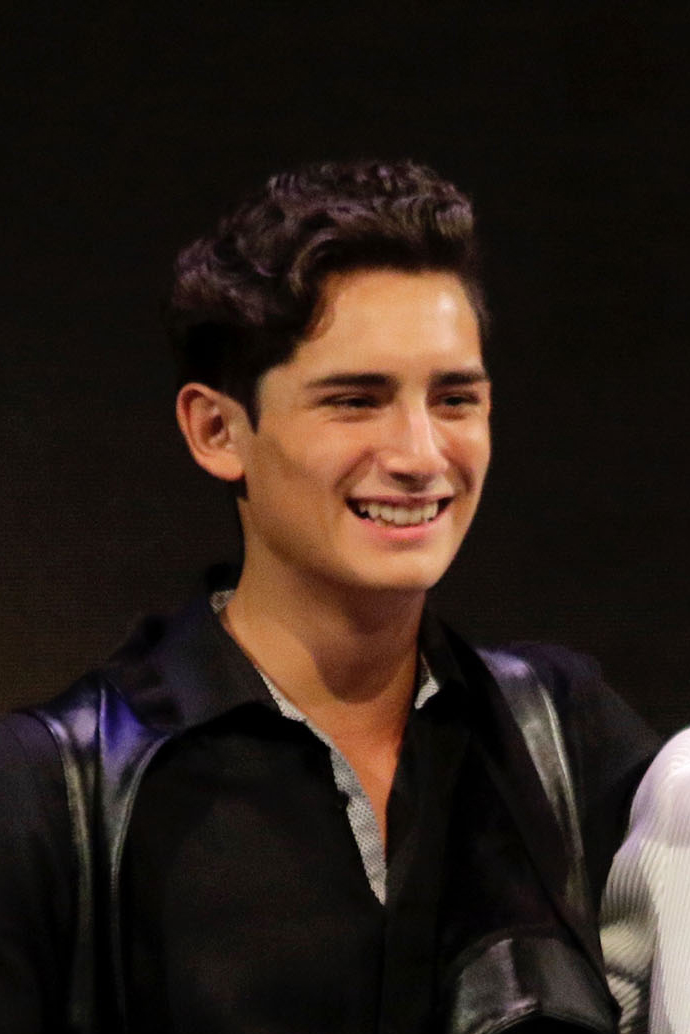
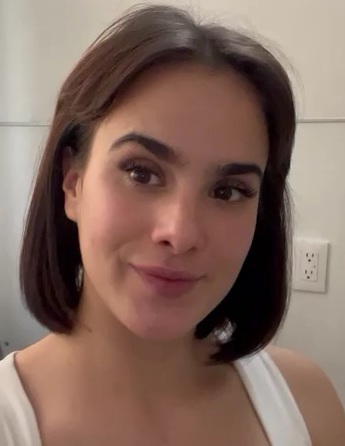
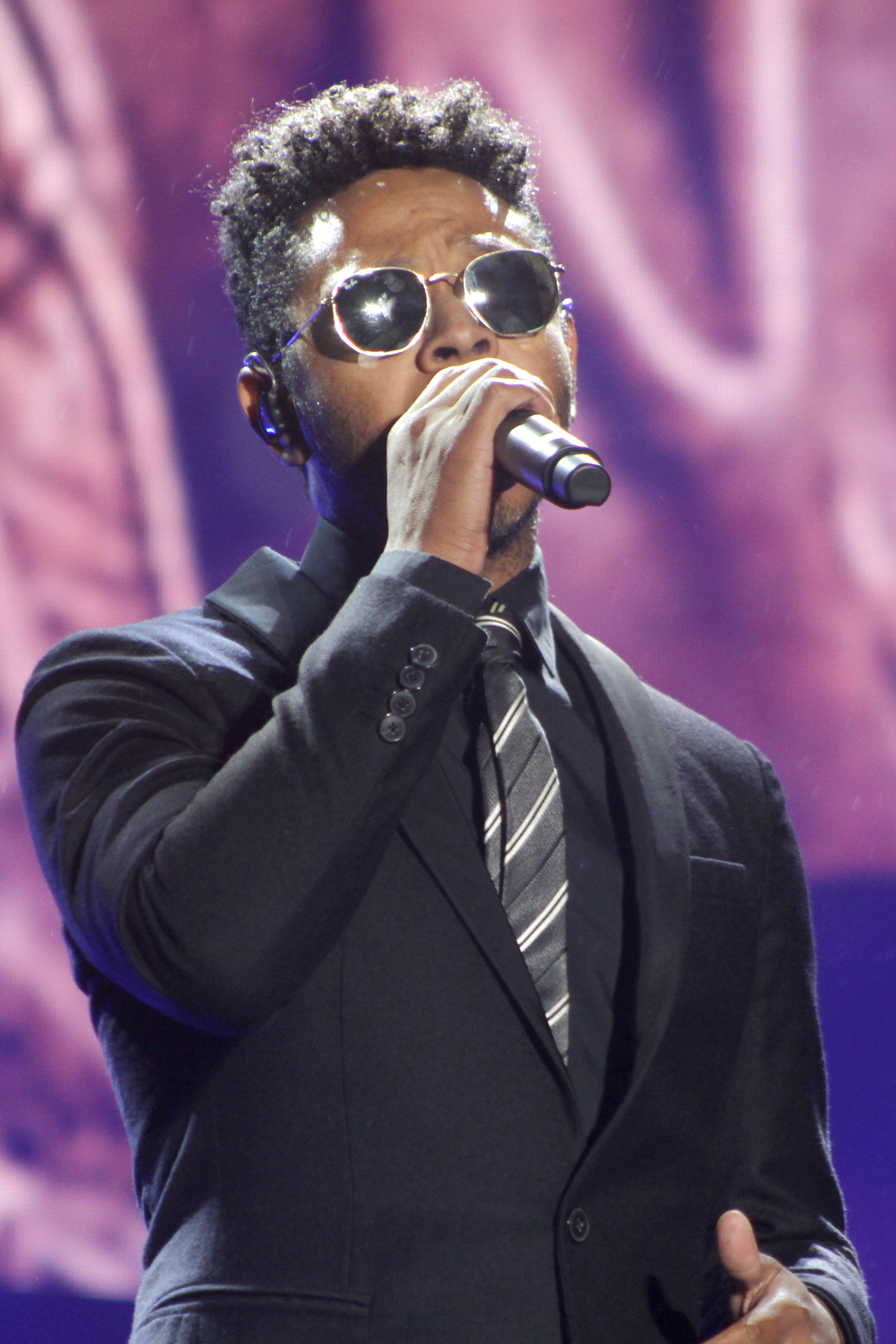
The celebrities who competed in the third season of ¿Quién es la máscara?, pictured in order of elimination (L-R):
Paola Espinosa ("Caracol"), Adriana Monsalve ("Hormiga Reina"), Faisy ("Zarigüeya"), Lorena Herrera ("Sirena"), Maria del Sol ("Monstruo de las Nieves"), Carlos Ponce ("Búho"), Noel Schajris ("Sapo"), Dulce María ("Leona"), Sandra Echeverría ("Androide"), Tatiana ("Carnívora"), Erik Rubín ("Perzoso"), Emilio Osorio ("La Hueva"), Gala Montes ("Gitana"), and Kalimba ("Apache")
Not pictured: Mauricio Garza ("Brócoli"), Ricardo López ("Perro"), Kunno ("Caperuza"), and Emmanuel Palomares ("Jocho")

== Episodes ==
=== Week 1 (October 10) ===
- Guest performance: "Las Locuras Mías" performed by Omar Chaparro featuring Joey Montana

Performances on the first episode
#	Stage name	Song	Identity	Result
1	La Hueva	"Todo de Ti" by Rauw Alejandro	undisclosed	RISK
2	Carnívora	"Oops!... I Did It Again" by Britney Spears	undisclosed	WIN
3	Brócoli	"Besos En Guerra" by Juanes & Morat	Mauricio Garza	OUT
4	Sapo	"Botella Tras Botella" by Gera MX & Christian Nodal	undisclosed	WIN
5	Caracol	"Como la Flor" by Selena	Paola Espinosa	OUT
6	Búho	"No Podrás" by Cristian Castro	undisclosed	RISK

=== Week 2 (October 17) ===
Performances on the second episode
#	Stage name	Song	Identity	Result
1	Perezoso	"Beggin'" by Måneskin	undisclosed	WIN
2	Perro	"Llorarás" by Oscar D'León	Ricardo López	OUT
3	Jocho	"No Se Me Quita" by Maluma feat. Ricky Martin	undisclosed	RISK
4	Androide	"Bichota" by Karol G	undisclosed	RISK
5	Caperuza	"Amor a Primera Vista" by Belinda, Lalo Ebratt, & Los Ángeles Azules	Kunno	OUT
6	Apache	"Que Te Ruegue Quien Te Quiera" by Banda el Recodo	undisclosed	WIN

=== Week 3 (October 24) ===
Performances on the third episode
#	Stage name	Song	Identity	Result
1	Monstruo de las Nieves	"Bidi Bidi Bom Bom" by Selena	undisclosed	WIN
2	Hormiga Reina	"Mi razón de ser" by Banda MS	Adriana Monsalve	OUT
3	Gitana	"Las Maravillas de la Vida" by Los Angeles Azules	undisclosed	RISK
4	Leona	"Si Te Vas" by Shakira	undisclosed	WIN
5	Zarigüeya	"Dakiti" by Bad Bunny & Jhayco	Faisy	OUT
6	Sirena	"Bandido" by Ana Bárbara	undisclosed	RISK

=== Week 4 (October 31) ===
- Group Performance: "Ghostbusters" by Ray Parker Jr.

Performances on the fourth episode
#	Stage name	Song	Result	
Round One
1	Jocho	"Pareja del Año" by Sebastián Yatra & Myke Towers	RISK	
2	Carnívora	"Heart of Glass" by Blondie	WIN	
3	Gitana	"Only Girl (In the World)" by Rihanna	RISK	
Máscara vs. Máscara			Identity	Result
1	Jocho	"Y Llegaste Tú" by Banda el Recodo	Emmanuel Palomares	OUT
1	Gitana	"Y Llegaste Tú" by Banda el Recodo	undisclosed	SAFE
Round Two
4	Apache	"Felices los 4" by Maluma	WIN	
5	Sirena	"La Mejor Versión de Mí" by Natti Natasha	RISK	
6	La Hueva	"Tan Enamorados" by Ricardo Montaner	RISK	
Máscara vs. Máscara			Identity	Result
1	Sirena	"Dime Cómo Quieres" by Christian Nodal & Ángela Aguilar	Lorena Herrera	OUT
1	La Hueva	"Dime Cómo Quieres" by Christian Nodal & Ángela Aguilar	undisclosed	SAFE

=== Week 5 (November 7) ===
Performances on the fifth episode
#	Stage name	Song	Result	
Round One
1	Perezoso	"De Los Besos Que Te Di" by Christian Nodal	WIN	
2	Sapo	"Leave the Door Open" by Silk Sonic	RISK	
3	Monstruo de las Nieves	"Creo en Mí" by Natalia Jiménez	RISK	
Máscara vs. Máscara			Identity	Result
1	Monstruo de las Nieves	"Te aprovechas" by Grupo Límite	María del Sol	OUT
1	Sapo	"Te aprovechas" by Grupo Límite	undisclosed	SAFE
Round Two
4	Leona	"No soy una señora" by María José	WIN	
5	Búho	"Mil horas" by Los Abuelos de la Nada	RISK	
6	Androide	"Poker Face" by Lady Gaga	RISK	
Máscara vs. Máscara			Identity	Result
1	Búho	"Ni Tú Ni Nadie" by Mœnia	Carlos Ponce	OUT
1	Androide	"Ni Tú Ni Nadie" by Mœnia	undisclosed	SAFE

=== Week 6 (November 14) ===
Performances on the sixth episode
#	Stage name	Song	Identity	Result
1	Apache	"I Like to Move It" by Reel 2 Real feat. The Mad Stuntman	undisclosed	SAFE
2	Sapo	"Yonaguni" by Bad Bunny	Noel Schajris	OUT
3	Androide	"Cinco Minutos" by Gloria Trevi	undisclosed	SAFE
4	La Hueva	"Dynamite" by BTS	undisclosed	SAFE
5	Carnívora	"Me Pasé" by Enrique Iglesias feat. Farruko	undisclosed	RISK
6	Gitana	"Telepatía" by Kali Uchis	undisclosed	SAFE
7	Leona	"Tiempos Mejores" by Yuri	undisclosed	SAFE
8	Perezoso	"A La Antigüita" by Calibre 50	undisclosed	SAFE

=== Week 7 (November 21) ===
- Guest performance: "I Love Rock 'n' Roll" by Joan Jett & the Blackhearts performed by Hombre de Piedra

Performances on the seventh episode
#	Stage name	Song	Identity	Result
1	Carnívora	"Que nadie sepa mi sufrir" by Hugo del Carril	undisclosed	RISK
2	Perezoso	"Tutti Frutti" by Little Richard	undisclosed	SAFE
3	Gitana	"Como Tu Mujer" by Rocío Dúrcal	undisclosed	SAFE
4	Androide	"Never Enough" by Loren Allred	undisclosed	SAFE
5	La Hueva	"Háblame de Ti" by Banda MS	undisclosed	SAFE
6	Apache	"STAY" by The Kid Laroi & Justin Bieber	undisclosed	SAFE
7	Leona	"No Querías Lastimarme" by Gloria Trevi	Dulce María	OUT

=== Week 8 (November 28) ===
- Guest performance: "Hoy Tengo Ganas de Ti" by Alejandro Fernández & Christina Aguilera performed by Hombre de Piedra (Note: Perezoso joined Hombre de Piedra for the number to make it a duet)

Performances on the eighth episode
#	Stage name	Song	Identity	Result
1	Androide	"Titanium" by David Guetta feat. Sia	Sandra Echeverría	OUT
2	Carnívora	"Oye" by Beyoncé	undisclosed	SAFE
3	La Hueva	"Watermelon Sugar" by Harry Styles	undisclosed	SAFE
4	Perezoso	"Rebel Yell" by Billy Idol	undisclosed	RISK
5	Apache	"Chica Ideal" by Sebastián Yatra & Guaynaa	undisclosed	SAFE
6	Gitana	"Hips Don't Lie" by Shakira feat. Wyclef Jean	undisclosed	SAFE

=== Week 9 (December 5) ===
Guest performance: "Vente Pa' Ca" by Ricky Martin feat. Maluma performed by Hombre de Piedra (Note: Apache joined Hombre de Piedra for the number to make it a duet)

Performances on the ninth episode
#	Stage name	Song	Identity	Result
Round One
1	Apache	"Mambo No. 5 (A Little Bit Of...)" by Lou Bega	undisclosed	SAFE
2	Gitana	"Prefiero Ser Su Amante" by María José	undisclosed	SAFE
3	Perezoso	"Livin' la Vida Loca" by Ricky Martin	undisclosed	SAFE
4	La Hueva	"Mi Credo" by Pepe Aguilar	undisclosed	SAFE
5	Carnívora	"I'm So Excited" by The Pointer Sisters	Tatiana	OUT
Round Two
6	Perezoso	"Como Quien Pierde una Estrella" by Alejandro Fernández	Erik Rubín	OUT
7	Gitana	"Bad Romance" by Lady Gaga	undisclosed	SAFE
8	La Hueva	"Stayin' Alive" by Bee Gees/"In da Club" by 50 Cent	undisclosed	SAFE
9	Apache	"In da Getto" by J Balvin & Skrillex	undisclosed	SAFE

=== Week 10 (December 19) ===
- Group performance: "Carnaval" by Maluma performed by Hombre de Piedra
- Third place performance: "El Listón de tu pelo" by Los Ángeles Azules performed by La Hueva
- Guest performance: "Ensayando Cómo Pedirte Perdón" performed by Gloria Trevi as Hombre de Piedra

Performances on the tenth episode
#	Stage name	Song	Identity	Result
Round One
1	Gitana	"Las Mil y Una Noches" by Flans	undisclosed	SAFE
2	La Hueva	"Primero Dios" by Yuri & Marco Antonio Solís	Emilio Osorio	THIRD
3	Apache	"Cuántas Veces" by Carlos Rivera & Reik	undisclosed	SAFE
Round Two
4	Gitana	"La Tortura" by Shakira ft. Alejandro Sanz	Gala Montes	RUNNER-UP
5	Apache	"Can't Stop the Feeling!" by Justin Timberlake	Kalimba	WINNER

== Ratings ==
Show	Episode	Air date	Timeslot (CT)	Viewers (millions)
1	"Una noche llena de sorpresas"	October 10, 2021	Sunday; 8:30 p.m.	3.9
2	"El escenario está lleno de magia"	October 17, 2021	Sunday; 8:30 p.m.	3.8
3	"Las sorpresas no paran de llegar"	October 24, 2021	Sunday; 8:30 p.m.	3.6
4	"Máscara vs. máscara"	October 31, 2021	Sunday; 8:30 p.m.	3.0
5	"Una noche que cautivará a todos"	November 7, 2021	Sunday; 8:30 p.m.	3.9
6	"Todo el talento sobre el escenario"	November 14, 2021	Sunday; 8:30 p.m.	3.6
7	"Un gran misterio está por revelarse"	November 21, 2021	Sunday; 8:30 p.m.	3.3
8	"La final está cada vez más cerca"	November 28, 2021	Sunday; 8:30 p.m.	3.5
9	"Por un lugar en la final"	December 5, 2021	Sunday; 8:30 p.m.	3.7
10	"La última sorpresa"	December 19, 2021	Sunday; 8:30 p.m.	TBA
