= Gabriel Montiel =

Mexican YouTuber (born 1989)

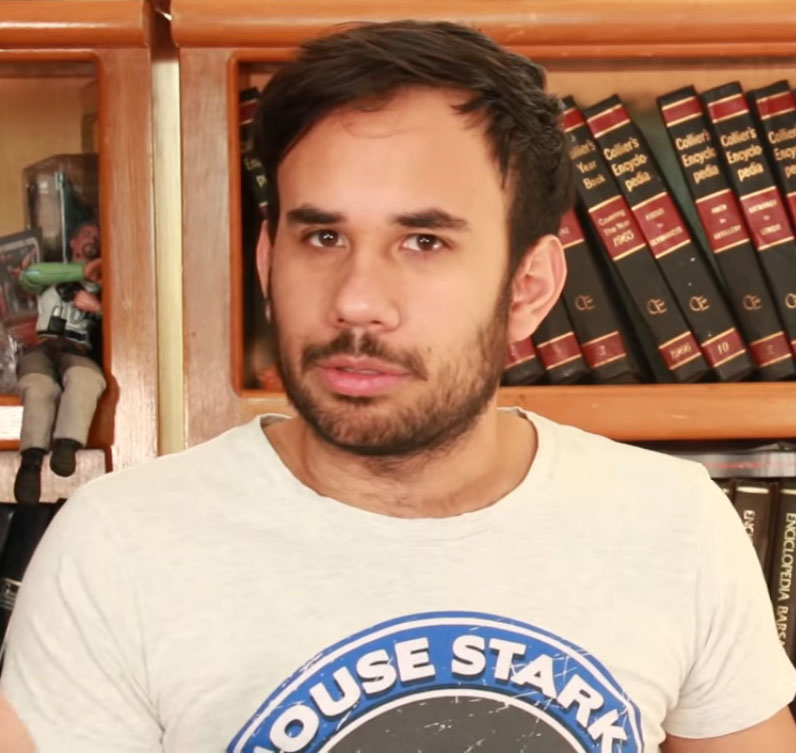
- Born: Gabriel Montiel Gutiérrez; 23 September 1989 (age 37)
- Family: Alex Montiel (brother)

YouTube information
- Channels: Werever2morro; ElGaborever
- Years active: 2007–present
- Genres: Comedy; vlog; gaming
- Subscribers: 16.5 million (Werever2morro); 3.36 million (ElGaborever)
- Views: 2.85 billion (Werever2morro); 245 million (ElGaborever)
Association football career
Youth career
- Águilas de Teotihuacán
Senior career*
Years	Team	Apps	(Gls)
2014	Murciélagos	1	(0)
Total		1	(0)
- * Club domestic league appearances and goals as of 29 August 2014
- Last updated: 2 May 2023

Gabriel Montiel Gutiérrez (born 23 September 1989), better known by his pseudonyms Werevertumorro and Gaborever, is a Mexican YouTuber whose content includes vlogs and Let's Play. His YouTube channels got hacked and then deleted on 25 July 2022.

Montiel also played as a defensive midfielder for the football team Murciélagos in the Liga Premier de Ascenso (third tier of football in Mexico).

== YouTube career ==
Gabriel Montiel started the Werevertumorro channel with Ricardo Ortiz on February 27, 2007. Initially, they used the platform as a kind of library to store the assignments and projects they were required to do at university.

Their content quickly became popular, making them the first Spanish-language YouTuber in history to reach one million subscribers.

Throughout his career, he has diversified his content, including series, gameplay videos, interviews, reactions, happenings, parodies, reports, reviews, and collaborations with other YouTubers. Content creators as diverse as Germán Garmendia, Fernanfloo, Yuya, El Rubius, Dross, Los Polinesios, Luisito Comunica, EnchufeTV, and many others have been influenced by his work online.

== Club career ==
=== Águilas de Teotihuacán ===
Montiel's career in football began at a remarkably young age of 16, when he started playing for Arcesvids's affiliate youth team, Águilas de Teotihuacán. He made his debut during the Apertura 2007 season, August 18, 2007, in a 3–0 defeat against Real Olmec Sport. On September 19, 2007, he scored his first goal against Tolcayuca in a 1–0 win for Águilas. He made a second goal on October 10, 2007, against Real Halcones; the match ended in a 2–2 draw. Montiel made 12 appearances and 2 goals for Águilas de Teotihuacán.

=== Murciélagos ===
On 7 August 2014, Montiel announced on Twitter that he was joining Murciélagos for the Apertura 2014 season, alongside his mate Israel Rivera, who also takes part of Werevertumorro Crew. Gabriel only played for 5 minutes in the game played against Universidad Autónoma de Zacatecas, the final result was 1-1.

=== Career statistics ===
==== Club ====
As of 29 August 2014

Club	Season	League			Cup		Continental		Other		Total	
Club	Season	Division	Apps	Goals	Apps	Goals	Apps	Goals	Apps	Goals	Apps	Goals
Murciélagos	2014–15	Liga Premier de Ascenso	1	0	–		–		–		1	0
Career total			1	0	0	0	0	0	0	0	1	0
