= ¿Quién es la máscara? (Mexican TV series) season 4 =

¿Quién es la máscara?
- Season 4
- Hosted by: Omar Chaparro
- Judges: Carlos Rivera; Galilea Montijo; Juanpa Zurita; Yuri
- Winner: Karla Díaz-Leal, Melissa López, Regina Murguía and Angie Taddei as "Huacal"
- Runner-up: Ana Bárbara as "Alebrije"
- No. of episodes: 10

Release
- Original network: Las Estrellas
- Original release: October 16 – December 18, 2022

Season chronology
- ← Previous; Season 3 Next → Season 5

The fourth season of the Mexican television series ¿Quién es la máscara? premiered on Las Estrellas on October 16, 2022. On December 18, 2022, Huacal (singers Karla Díaz-Leal, Melissa López, Regina Murguía and Angie Taddei) was declared the winner, and Alebrije (singer Ana Bárbara) the runner-up.

== Panelists and host ==
Season 4 panelists and host

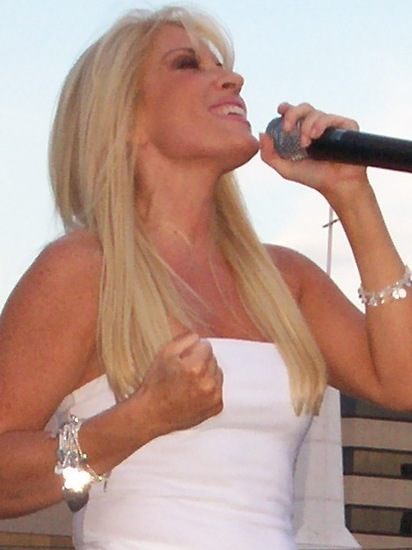
Yuri

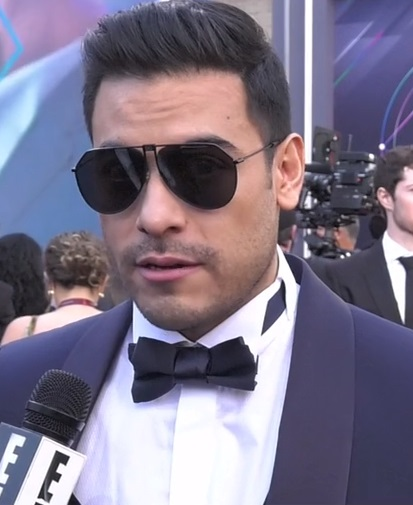
Carlos Rivera

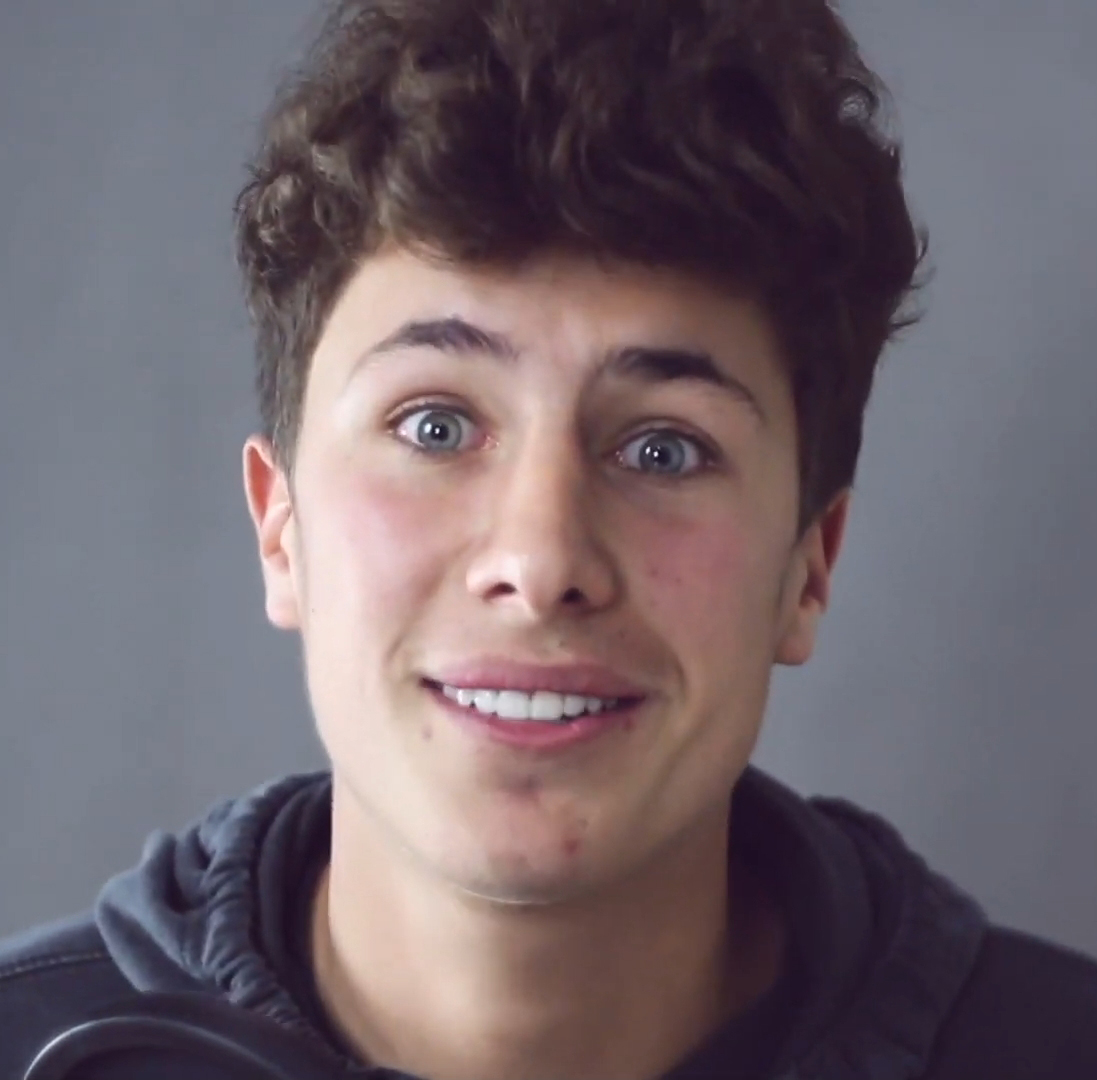
Juanpa Zurita

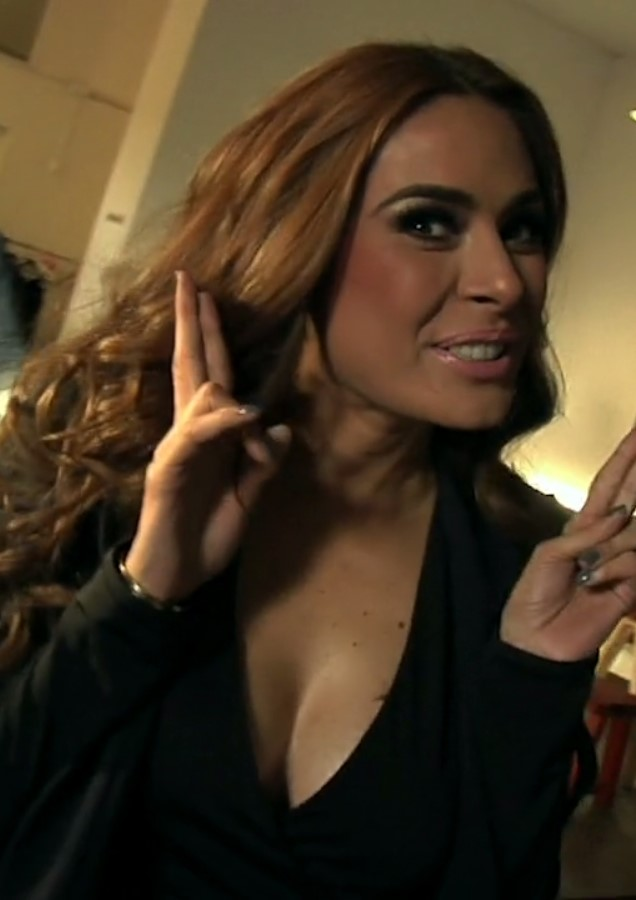
Galilea Montijo

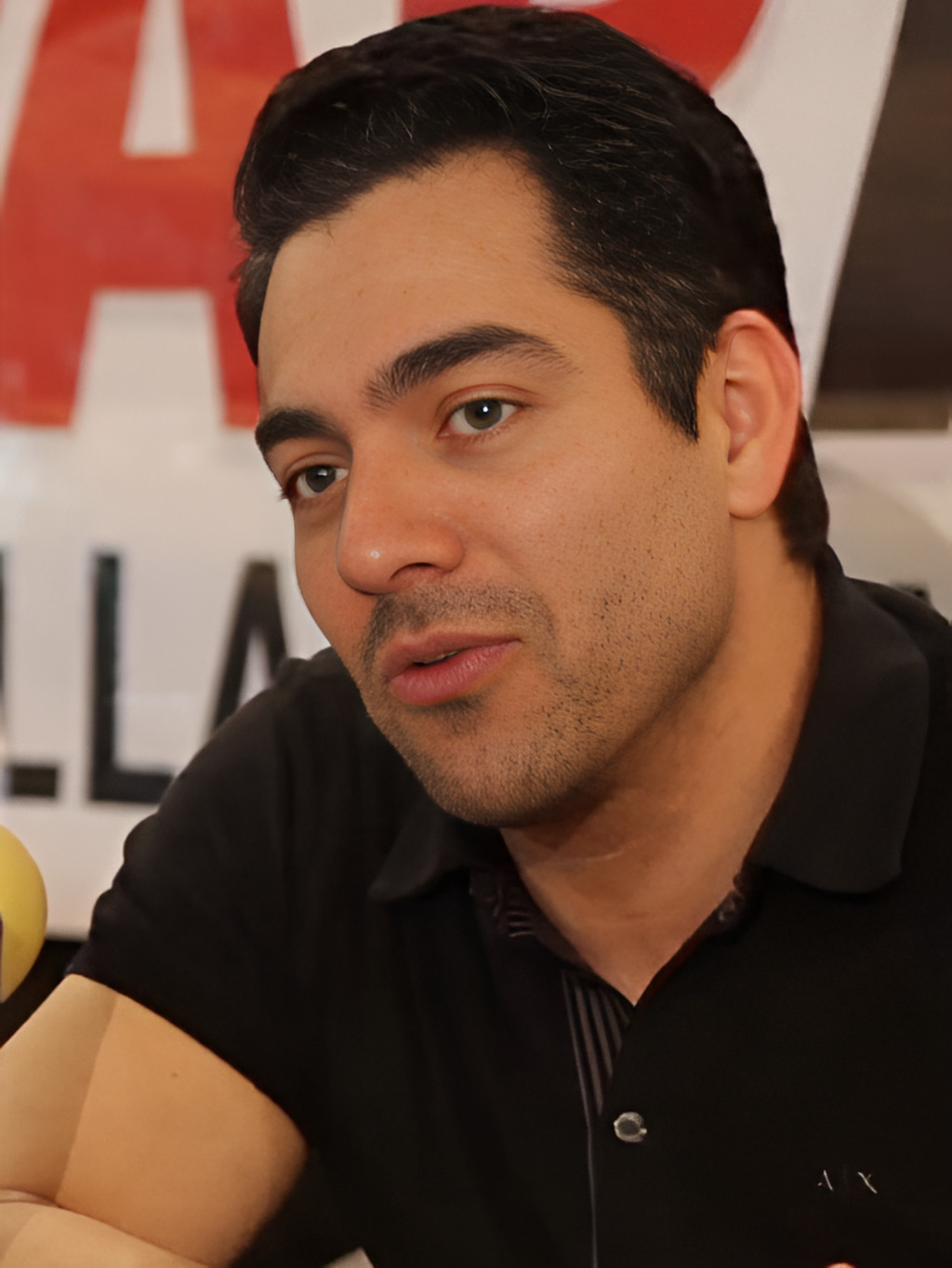
Omar Chaparro

Singer Yuri, singer Carlos Rivera, and social media influencer Juanpa Zurita returned as panelists. Mónica Huarte did not return as a panelist and was replaced by Galilea Montijo. Former host Omar Chaparro returned to the show as host, replacing Adrián Uribe.

Throughout the season, various guest panelists appeared as the fifth panelist in the panel for one episode. These guest panelists included season 3 contestant Carlos Ponce (episode 4), actress Irina Baeva (episode 5), singer Kenia Os (episode 5), and actress Ana Claudia Talancón (episode 6).

== Contestants ==
In addition to the core group of contestants, the season also features a non-contestant mask "Dr. Veneno" (Dr. Venom) who first appeared in the sixth episode and were ultimately unmasked in the eighth episode as actor Salvador Zerboni.

Results
Stage name	Celebrity	Occupation(s)	Episodes											
Stage name	Celebrity	Occupation(s)	1	2	3	4	5	6	7	8	9		10	
Stage name	Celebrity	Occupation(s)	1	2	3	4	5	6	7	8	A	B	A	B
Huacal	Karla Díaz-Leal	Singers			RISK		WIN	SAFE	SAFE	SAFE	SAFE	SAFE	SAFE	WINNERS
Huacal	Melissa López	Singers			RISK		WIN	SAFE	SAFE	SAFE	SAFE	SAFE	SAFE	WINNERS
Huacal	Regina Murguía	Singers			RISK		WIN	SAFE	SAFE	SAFE	SAFE	SAFE	SAFE	WINNERS
Huacal	Angie Taddei	Singers			RISK		WIN	SAFE	SAFE	SAFE	SAFE	SAFE	SAFE	WINNERS
Alebrije	Ana Bárbara	Singer			WIN	WIN		SAFE	SAFE	SAFE	SAFE	SAFE	SAFE	RUNNER-UP
Bunch	Ricardo Margaleff	Actor			RISK	RISK		SAFE	SAFE	SAFE	SAFE	SAFE	THIRD	
Koaláctico	El Compayito (Note: El Compayito was performed by comedian Edson Zuñiga.)	Hand Puppet			WIN	WIN		SAFE	SAFE	RISK	SAFE	OUT (Note: Koaláctico was eliminated from the competition in the ninth episode, however they were unmasked in the tenth episode.)		
Triki	Bibi Gaytán	Singer and actress		WIN			RISK	SAFE	SAFE	SAFE	OUT			
Kid Bengala	Román Torres	Singer	WIN			RISK		SAFE	RISK	OUT				
Geisha	Irán Castillo	Actress and singer	RISK				RISK	RISK	OUT					
Graffiti	Beto Cuevas	Singer and actor	WIN				WIN	OUT						
Elvestruz	Pablo Montero	Singer and actor		WIN			OUT							
Dálmata	Fernanda Meade	Singer	RISK				OUT							
Jinete	José Ron	Actor		RISK		OUT								
Bot	Diego Schoening	Singer and actor		RISK		OUT								
Cactus	Fernando Carrillo	Actor and singer			OUT									
Alfiletero	Litzy	Singer and actress			OUT									
Cornelio	Pee Wee	Singer		OUT										
Rey Egipcio	Adrián Uribe	Actor and comedian		OUT										
Escoba	Mariana Juárez	Boxer	OUT											
Pulpo	Lele Pons	Internet personality	OUT											

The masked singer won their face-off and remained in the competition.
The masked singer lost their face-off, but was not eliminated.
The masked singer was safe from elimination.
The masked singer was eliminated from the competition.
The masked singer did not perform.

== Episodes ==
=== Week 1 (October 16) ===
- Guest performance: "La Gozadera" by Gente de Zona ft. Marc Anthony performed by Kalimba, Carlos Rivera and Yuri

Performances on the first episode
#	Stage name	Song	Identity	Result
1	Pulpo	"Can't Remember to Forget You" by Shakira ft. Rihanna	Lele Pons	OUT
2	Graffiti	"Circles" by Post Malone	undisclosed	WIN
3	Dálmata	"Amárrame" by Mon Laferte	undisclosed	RISK
4	Escoba	"Háblame de Ti" by Banda MS	Mariana Juárez	OUT
5	Geisha	"I'm So Excited" by The Pointer Sisters	undisclosed	RISK
6	Kid Bengala	"Chale" by Edén Muñoz	undisclosed	WIN

=== Week 2 (October 23) ===
Performances on the second episode
#	Stage name	Song	Identity	Result
1	Bot	"La Casita" by Banda MS	undisclosed	RISK
2	Triki	"Proud Mary" by Tina Turner	undisclosed	WIN
3	Rey Egipcio	"Vente Pa' Ca" by Ricky Martin	Adrián Uribe	OUT
4	Elvestruz	"Suspicious Minds" by Elvis Presley	undisclosed	WIN
5	Cornelio	"El Taxi" by Pitbull ft. Sensato & Osmani García	Pee Wee	OUT
6	Jinete	"Cumbia A La Gente" by Guaynaa & Los Ángeles Azules	undisclosed	RISK

=== Week 3 (October 30) ===
Performances on the third episode
#	Stage name	Song	Identity	Result
1	Bunch	"I'm Still Standing" by Elton John	undisclosed	RISK
2	Alfiletero	"Provenza" by Karol G	Litzy	OUT
3	Koaláctico	"Ramito de Violetas" by Mi Banda El Mexicano	undisclosed	WIN
4	Alebrije	"La Bachata" by Manuel Turizo	undisclosed	WIN
5	Cactus	"Tití Me Preguntó" by Bad Bunny	Fernando Carrillo	OUT
6	Huacal	"Me Rehúso" by Danny Ocean	undisclosed	RISK

=== Week 4 (November 6) ===
Performances on the fourth episode
#	Stage name	Song	Result	
Round One
1	Alebrije	"El Farsante" by Ozuna	WIN	
2	Bot	"Pa' Olvidarme De Ella" by Piso 21 & Christian Nodal	RISK	
3	Bunch	"Ahora Te Puedes Marchar" by Luis Miguel	RISK	
Máscara vs. Máscara			Identity	Result
1	Bot	"Peligro" by Reik	Diego Schoening	OUT
1	Bunch	"Peligro" by Reik	undisclosed	SAFE
Round Two
4	Jinete	"La Gota Fría" by Carlos Vives	RISK	
5	Koaláctico	"Mi Bebito Fiu Fiu" by Tito Silva	WIN	
6	Kid Bengala	"La Mejor De Todas" by Banda El Recodo	RISK	
Máscara vs. Máscara			Identity	Result
1	Jinete	"Bella" by Mijares	José Ron	OUT
1	Kid Bengala	"Bella" by Mijares	undisclosed	SAFE

=== Week 5 (November 13) ===
Performances on the fifth episode
#	Stage name	Song	Result	
Round One
1	Dálmata	"Running Up That Hill" by Kate Bush	RISK	
2	Graffiti	"Ojitos Lindos" by Bad Bunny & Bomba Estéreo	WIN	
3	Triki	"Tacones Rojos" by Sebastián Yatra	RISK	
Máscara vs. Máscara			Identity	Result
1	Dálmata	"Amor a Primera Vista" by Los Ángeles Azules	Fernanda Meade	OUT
1	Triki	"Amor a Primera Vista" by Los Ángeles Azules	undisclosed	SAFE
Round Two
4	Elvestruz	"El Rey Azul" by Emmanuel	RISK	
5	Huacal	"Envolver" by Anitta	WIN	
6	Geisha	"Mon Amour" by Aitana & Zzoilo	RISK	
Máscara vs. Máscara			Identity	Result
1	Elvestruz	"Colgando en tus manos" by Carlos Baute	Pablo Montero	OUT
1	Geisha	"Colgando en tus manos" by Carlos Baute	undisclosed	SAFE

=== Week 6 (November 20) ===
Performances on the sixth episode
#	Stage name	Song	Identity	Result
1	Huacal	"Alaska" by Camilo & Grupo Firme	undisclosed	SAFE
2	Koaláctico	"La Chona" by Los Tucanes de Tijuana	undisclosed	SAFE
3	Graffiti	"Quevedo: Bzrp Music Sessions, Vol. 52" by Bizarrap & Quevedo	Beto Cuevas	OUT
4	Alebrije	"Yo no te pido la luna" by Daniela Romo	undisclosed	SAFE
5	Bunch	"Ya No Somos Ni Seremos" by Christian Nodal	undisclosed	SAFE
6	Kid Bengala	"As It Was" by Harry Styles	undisclosed	SAFE
7	Triki	"About Damn Time" by Lizzo	undisclosed	SAFE
8	Geisha	"Good 4 U" by Olivia Rodrigo	undisclosed	RISK

=== Week 7 (November 27) ===
- Guest performance: "Problema" by Timbiriche performed by Dr. Veneno

Performances on the seventh episode
#	Stage name	Song	Identity	Result
1	Alebrije	"Me Gustas Mucho" by Rocío Dúrcal	undisclosed	SAFE
2	Triki	"I Will Survive" by Gloria Gaynor	undisclosed	SAFE
3	Geisha	"Danza Kuduro" by Don Omar ft. Lucenzo	Irán Castillo	OUT
4	Huacal	"XT4S1S" by Danna Paola	undisclosed	SAFE
5	Koaláctico	"Los Luchadores" by Sonora Santanera	undisclosed	SAFE
6	Kid Bengala	"La Chica de Humo" by Emmanuel	undisclosed	RISK
7	Bunch	"Rock DJ" by Robbie Williams	undisclosed	SAFE

=== Week 8 (December 4) ===
- Group performance: "I Gotta Feeling" by Black Eyed Peas
- Guest reveal: Salvador Zerboni as Dr. Veneno

Performances on the eighth episode
#	Stage name	Song	Identity	Result
1	Alebrije	"Te Felicito" by Shakira & Rauw Alejandro	undisclosed	SAFE
2	Bunch	"Moves Like Jagger" by Maroon 5 ft. Christina Aguilera	undisclosed	SAFE
3	Koaláctico	"Sabes a Chocolate" by Kumbia Kings	undisclosed	RISK
4	Kid Bengala	"Get Lucky" by Daft Punk	Román Torres	OUT
5	Huacal	"El Bombón Asesino" by Ninel Conde	undisclosed	SAFE
6	Triki	"Inolvidable" by Jenni Rivera	undisclosed	SAFE

=== Week 9 (December 11) ===
Performances on the ninth episode
#	Stage name	Song	Identity	Result
Round One
1	Triki	"Believe" by Cher	Bibi Gaytán	OUT
2	Huacal	"Wannabe" by Spice Girls	undisclosed	SAFE
3	Koaláctico	"Quién Pompó" by Chico Che	undisclosed	SAFE
4	Bunch	"Pepas" by Farruko	undisclosed	SAFE
5	Alebrije	"La Bicicleta" by Carlos Vives & Shakira	undisclosed	SAFE
Round Two
6	Alebrije	"Me Porto Bonito" by Bad Bunny	undisclosed	SAFE
7	Huacal	"Andas En Mi Cabeza" by Chino y Nacho ft. Daddy Yankee	undisclosed	SAFE
8	Koaláctico	"La Mushasha Shula" by Espinoza Paz	El Compayito	OUT
9	Bunch	"Fireball" by Pitbull	undisclosed	SAFE

=== Week 10 (December 18) ===
- Group performance: "Firework" by Katy Perry
- Guest performance: "Reza y Reza" performed by Ana Bárbara

Performances on the tenth episode
#	Stage name	Song	Identity	Result
Round One
1	Alebrije	"Te Hubieras Ido Antes" by Julión Álvarez	undisclosed	SAFE
2	Bunch	"Atrévete-te-te" by Calle 13	Ricardo Margaleff	THIRD
3	Huacal	"Despacito" by Luis Fonsi	undisclosed	SAFE
Round Two
4	Huacal	"Aléjate de mí" by Camila	Karla Díaz-Leal	WINNERS
4	Huacal	"Aléjate de mí" by Camila	Melissa López	WINNERS
4	Huacal	"Aléjate de mí" by Camila	Regina Murguía	WINNERS
4	Huacal	"Aléjate de mí" by Camila	Angie Taddei	WINNERS
5	Alebrije	"Imagina" by Jesse & Joy	Ana Bárbara	RUNNER-UP

== Ratings ==
Show	Episode	Air date	Timeslot (CT)	Viewers (millions)
1	"El inicio de un sueño"	October 16, 2022	Sunday; 8:30 p.m.	3.1
2	"Nuevos personajes en duelo"	October 23, 2022	Sunday; 8:30 p.m.	2.9
3	"Pistas que distraen de la verdad"	October 30, 2022	Sunday; 8:30 p.m.	2.9
4	"Dos personajes menos en la competencia"	November 6, 2022	Sunday; 8:30 p.m.	3.2
5	"Fuera máscara"	November 13, 2022	Sunday; 8:30 p.m.	3.2
6	"Un talento desperdiciado"	November 20, 2022	Sunday; 8:30 p.m.	3.0
7	"Dr. Veneno está en el escenario"	November 27, 2022	Sunday; 8:30 p.m.	3.3
8	"Cinco en secreto"	December 4, 2022	Sunday; 8:30 p.m.	2.7
9	"Camino a la semifinal"	December 11, 2022	Sunday; 8:30 p.m.	2.6
10	"La gran final"	December 18, 2022	Sunday; 8:00 p.m.	TBD
