= Alex Montiel =

Mexican YouTuber (born 1981)

Álex Montiel
- Montiel in 2018
- Born: Alejandro Montiel Gutiérrez; 23 May 1981 (age 45); Mexico City, Mexico
- Occupation: YouTuber
- Children: 2
- Family: Gabriel Montiel (brother)

YouTube information
- Channels: LaLata; ElPelucheEnElEstuche
- Years active: 2007–present
- Genres: Comedy, interview
- Subscribers: 2.95 million (LaLata); 9.60 million (ElPelucheEnElEstuche)
- Views: 480 million (LaLata); 2 billion (ElPelucheEnElEstuche)
- Last updated: 13 November 2026

Montiel as El Escorpión Dorado (right) interviewing Samy Rivers

Alejandro Montiel Gutiérrez (born 23 May 1981) is a Mexican YouTuber. Otherwise known for his alter ego character, El Escorpión Dorado, Montiel's content includes vlogs and interviews. He has also worked as a voice actor. He studied journalism at the Carlos Septién García School of Journalism, and is married and has two children. Montiel is the brother of Gabriel Montiel, another YouTuber.
