= ¿Quién es la máscara? (Mexican TV series) season 6 =

¿Quién es la máscara?
- Season 6
- Hosted by: Omar Chaparro
- Judges: Carlos Rivera; Juanpa Zurita; Martha Higareda; Anahí
- No. of contestants: 20
- Winner: Armando Hernández as "Freddie Verdury" (Note: Freddie Verdury was named the winner in the Mexican broadcast on Las Estrellas, the show's original network, while Cacahuate Enchilado was named the winner in the United States broadcast on Univision.)
- Runner-up: Galilea Montijo as "Cacahuate Enchilado"
- No. of episodes: 10

Release
- Original network: Las Estrellas
- Original release: 20 October – 22 December 2024

Season chronology
- ← Previous; Season 5 Next → Season 7

The sixth season of the Mexican television series ¿Quién es la máscara? premiered on Las Estrellas on October 20, 2024. For the first time in the show's history, the audience at home chose the winner of the season. On December 22, 2024, Freddie Verdury (actor Armando Hernández) was declared the winner, and Cacahuate Enchilado (TV personality Galilea Montijo) the runner-up. A separate vote was held for U.S. viewers on Univision, in which Cacahuate Enchilado won and Freddie Verdury was the runner-up.

== Production ==
Filming began on 5 September 2024. This is the first season to air simultaneously in the United States on Univision. Previous seasons aired on the U.S. network a few months after their broadcast in Mexico. It also introduces a gimmick known as the "Sálvame" (Save Me) button, which gives the panelists the chance to save a singer from elimination. Each of the panelists can use the button only once during the season. In addition, the season includes themed nights for the first time, including "'80s Night", "Telenovela Themes", and "Regional Mexican". The season features 20 new costumes.

== Panelists and host ==
Season 6 panelists and host

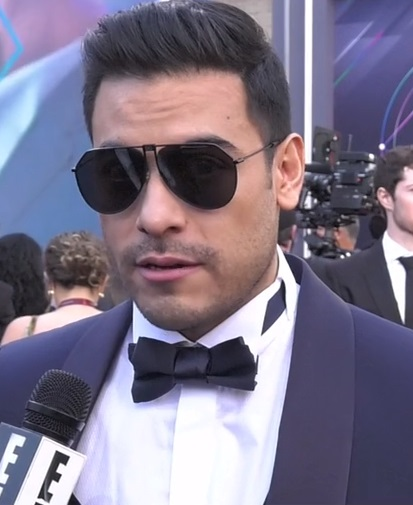
Carlos Rivera

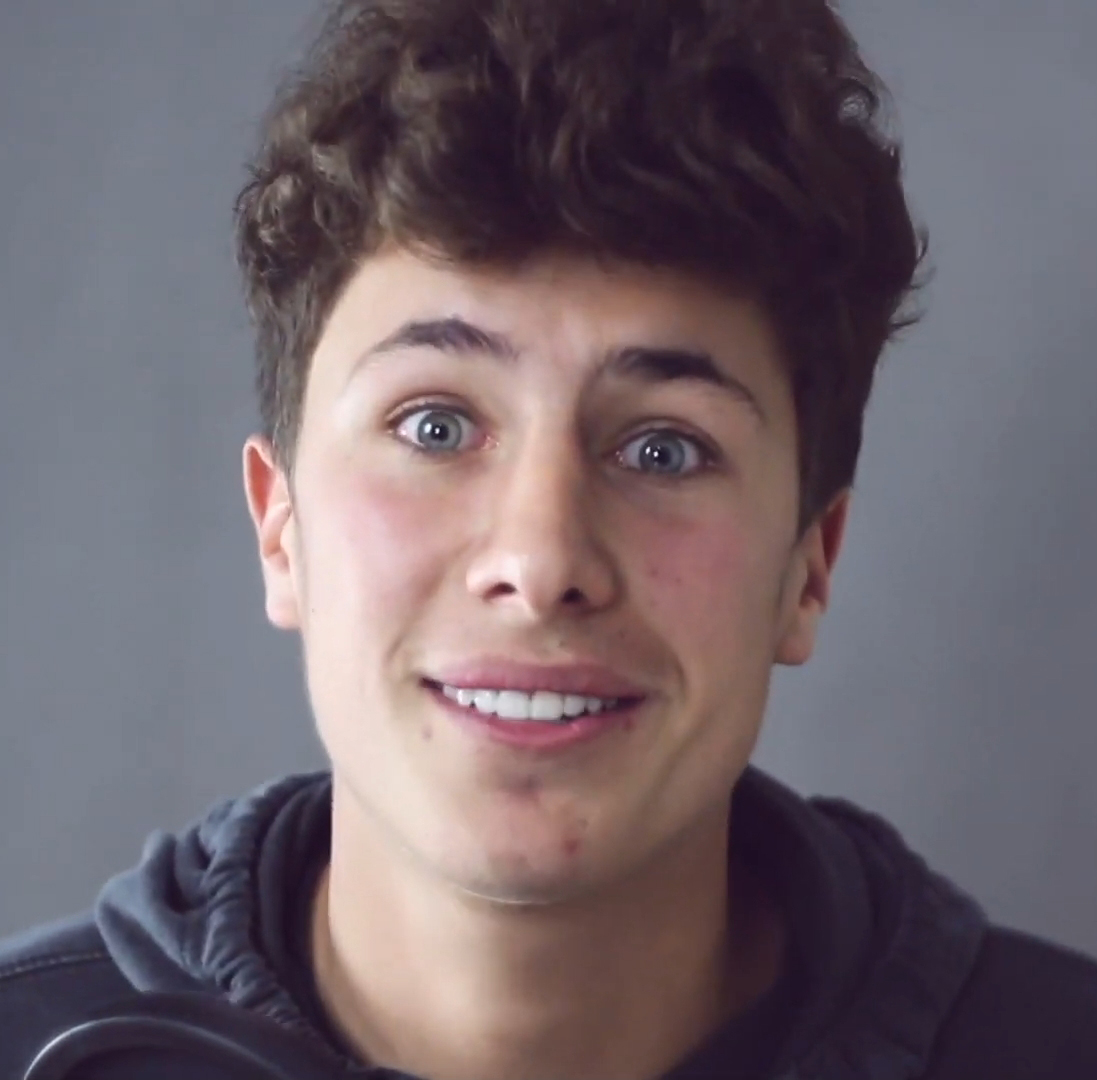
Juanpa Zurita

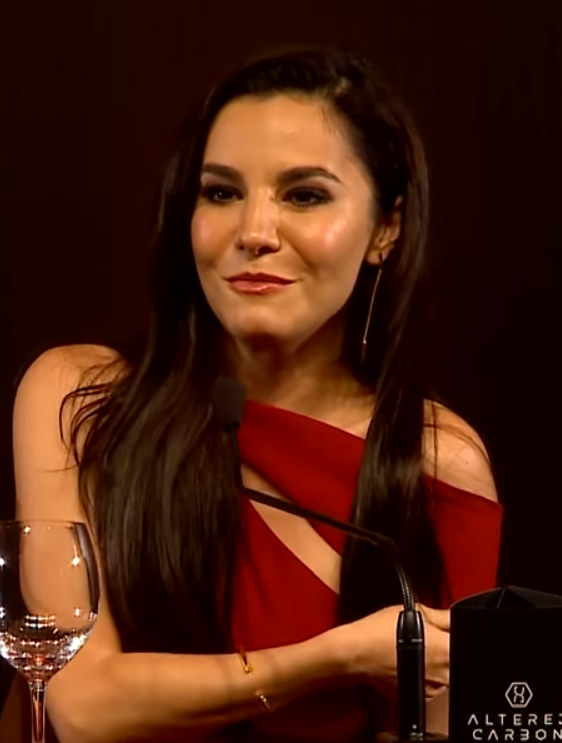
Martha Higareda

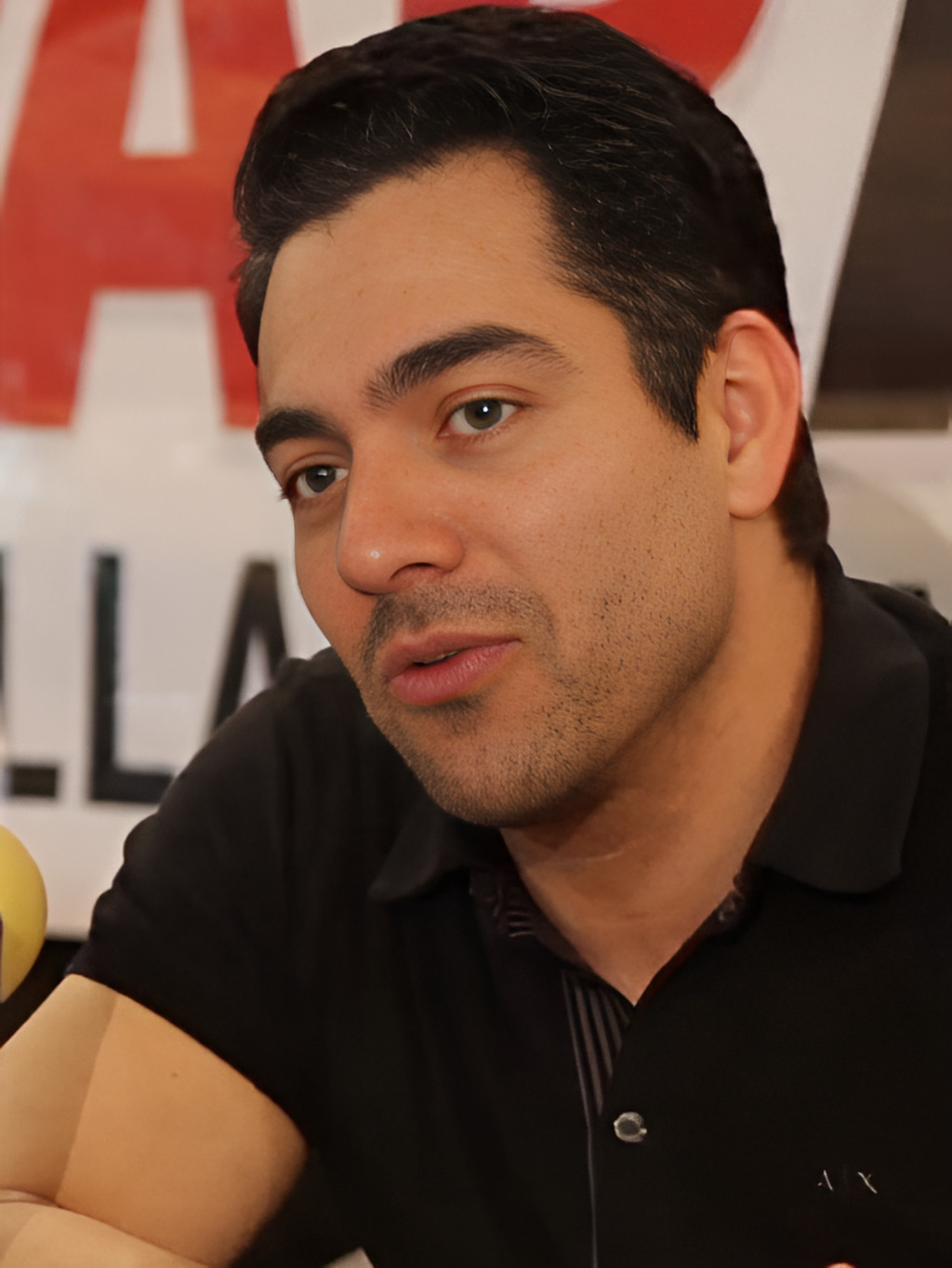
Omar Chaparro

Singer Carlos Rivera, social media influencer Juanpa Zurita, and actress Martha Higareda returned as panelists. Yuri did not return as a panelist, being replaced by singer and actress Anahí. Omar Chaparro returned as host.

Throughout the season, various guest panelists appeared as the fifth panelist in the panel for one episode. These guest panelists included singer Marta Sánchez (episode 1), season 5 winner Bárbara de Regil (episode 6), reality TV star Karime Pindter (episode 8), and actress Irina Baeva (episode 9).

== Contestants ==
Results
Stage name	Celebrity	Occupation(s)	Episodes										
Stage name	Celebrity	Occupation(s)	1	2	3	4	5	6	7	8	9	10	
Stage name	Celebrity	Occupation(s)	1	2	3	4	5	6	7	8	9	A	B
Freddie Verdury	Armando Hernández	Actor			WIN		WIN	RISK		WIN	SAFE	SAFE	WINNER
Cacahuate Enchilado	Galilea Montijo	TV personality	WIN				WIN		WIN	WIN	SAFE	SAFE	RUNNER-UP
Huesito Peligroso	Daniela Luján	Actress and singer	KEPT (Note: While in the middle of their unmasking, panelist Anahí used the "Sálvame" button to save Huesito Peligroso from elimination, allowing the portrayer to keep their mask on and continue in the competition.)				RISK		WIN	RISK	SAFE	THIRD	
Ranastacia	Ana Brenda Contreras	Actress			WIN		RISK		RISK	RISK	OUT		
Tutupótama	Yeri Mua	Influencer and singer		WIN		WIN		WIN		WIN	OUT		
Robotso	Samo	Singer	RISK			WIN		WIN		KEPT (Note: While in the middle of their unmasking, panelist Carlos Rivera used the "Sálvame" button to save Robotso from elimination, allowing the portrayer to keep their mask on and continue in the competition.)	OUT		
Venustiano	Edwin Luna	Singer	WIN				WIN		RISK	OUT			
Pepe Nador	Alejandro de la Madrid	Actor			WIN	KEPT (Note: While in the middle of their unmasking, panelist Martha Higareda used the "Sálvame" button to save Pepe Nador from elimination, allowing the portrayer to keep their mask on and continue in the competition.)		RISK		OUT			
Azul	Ninel Conde	Actress and singer			WIN	RISK			OUT				
Camilo Mandrilo	Irina Baeva	Actress		WIN		WIN			OUT				
Ricardilla	María Elena Saldaña	Actress		WIN			KEPT (Note: While in the middle of their unmasking, panelist Juanpa Zurita used the "Sálvame" button to save Ricardilla from elimination, allowing the portrayer to keep their mask on and continue in the competition.)	OUT					
Orni	Sara Maldonado	Actress	RISK			RISK		OUT					
Dale Dale	Manelyk González	TV personality		WIN			OUT						
Chepino Langostino	Martín Ricca	Singer and actor			RISK		OUT						
Pony	Majo Aguilar	Singer		RISK		OUT							
Maraña	Samy Rivers	Influencer			WIN	OUT							
María Joacuina	Cynthia Urías	TV personality			OUT								
Erik El Roto	El Fantasma	Singer		OUT									
Micrófono	Marko	Influencer and comedian	OUT										
Tucán	Marta Sánchez	Singer	OUT										

The masked singer won their face-off and remained in the competition.
The masked singer lost their face-off, but was not eliminated.
The masked singer was safe from elimination.
The masked singer was saved from elimination by a panelist using the "Sálvame" button.
The masked singer was eliminated from the competition.
The masked singer did not perform.
The masked singer is scheduled to perform.
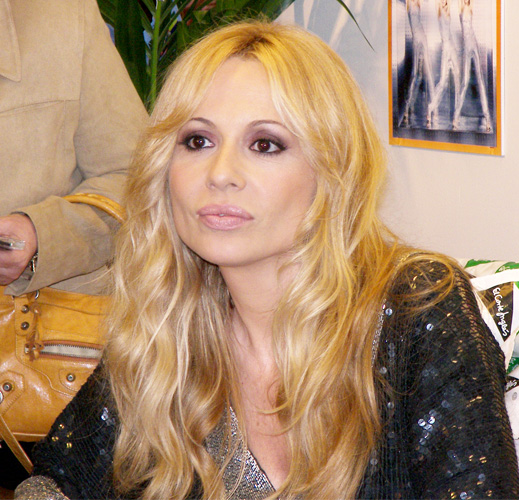
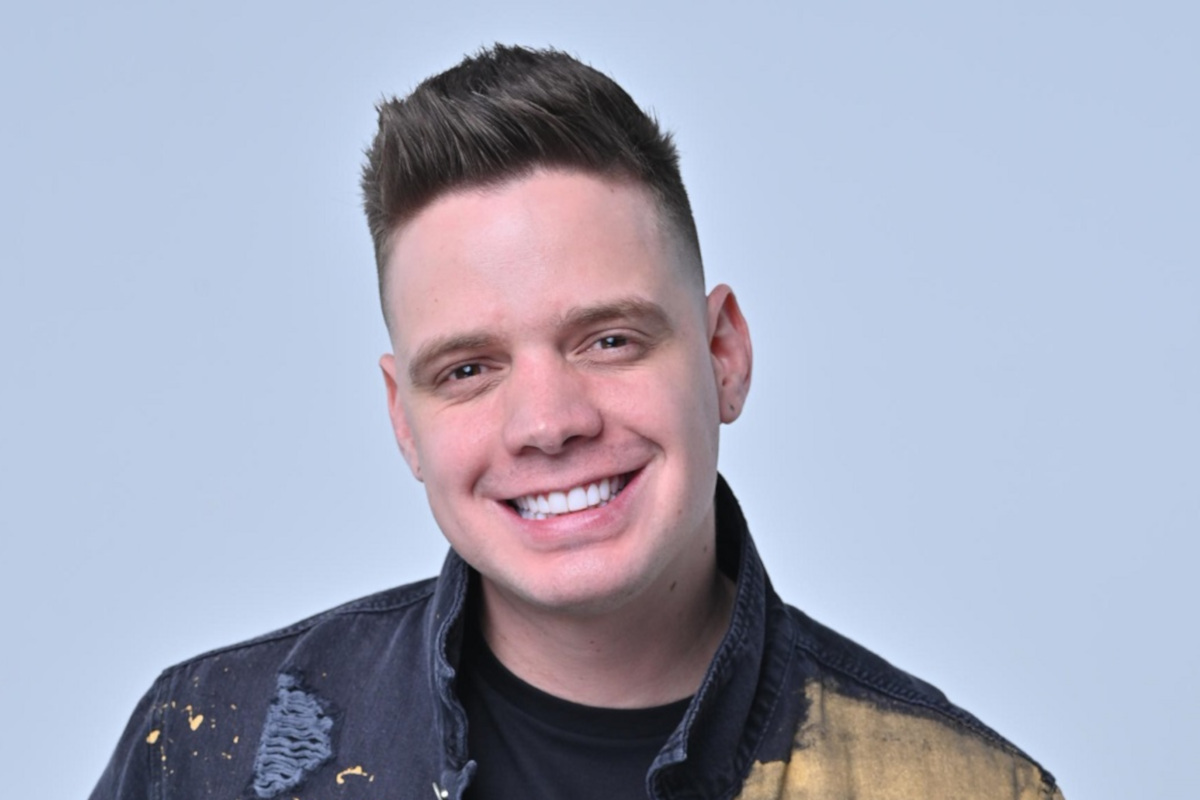
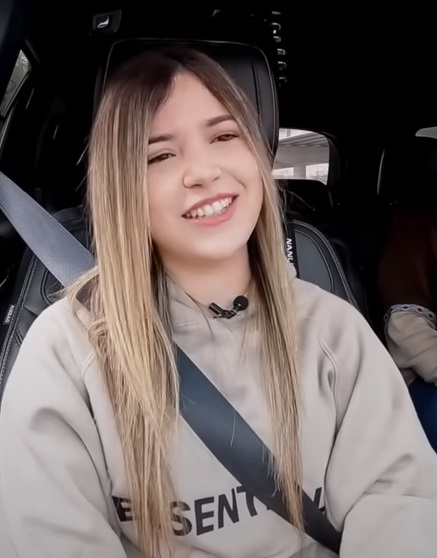
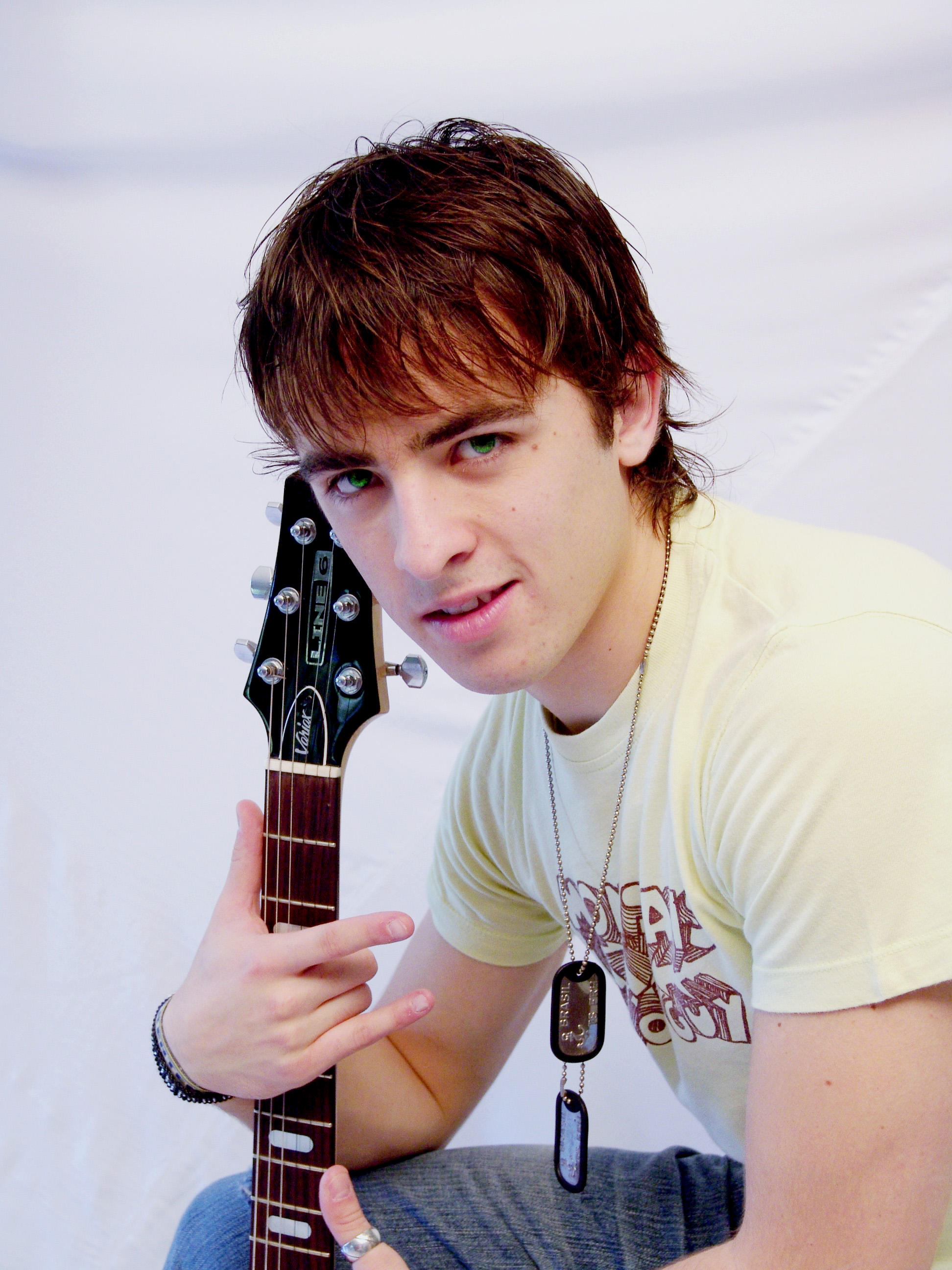
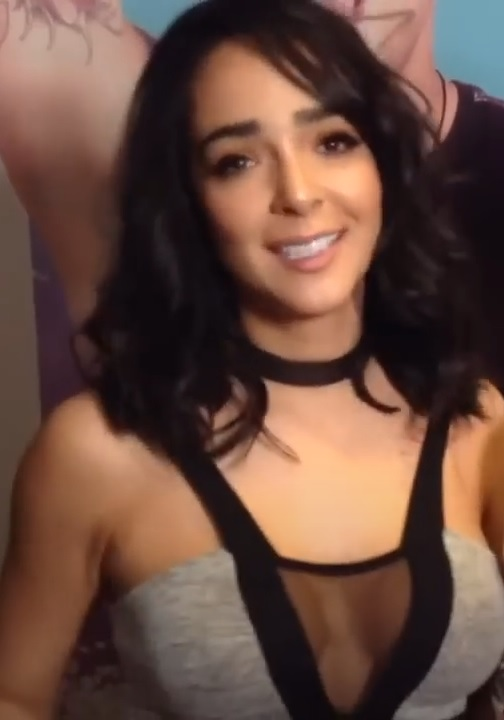
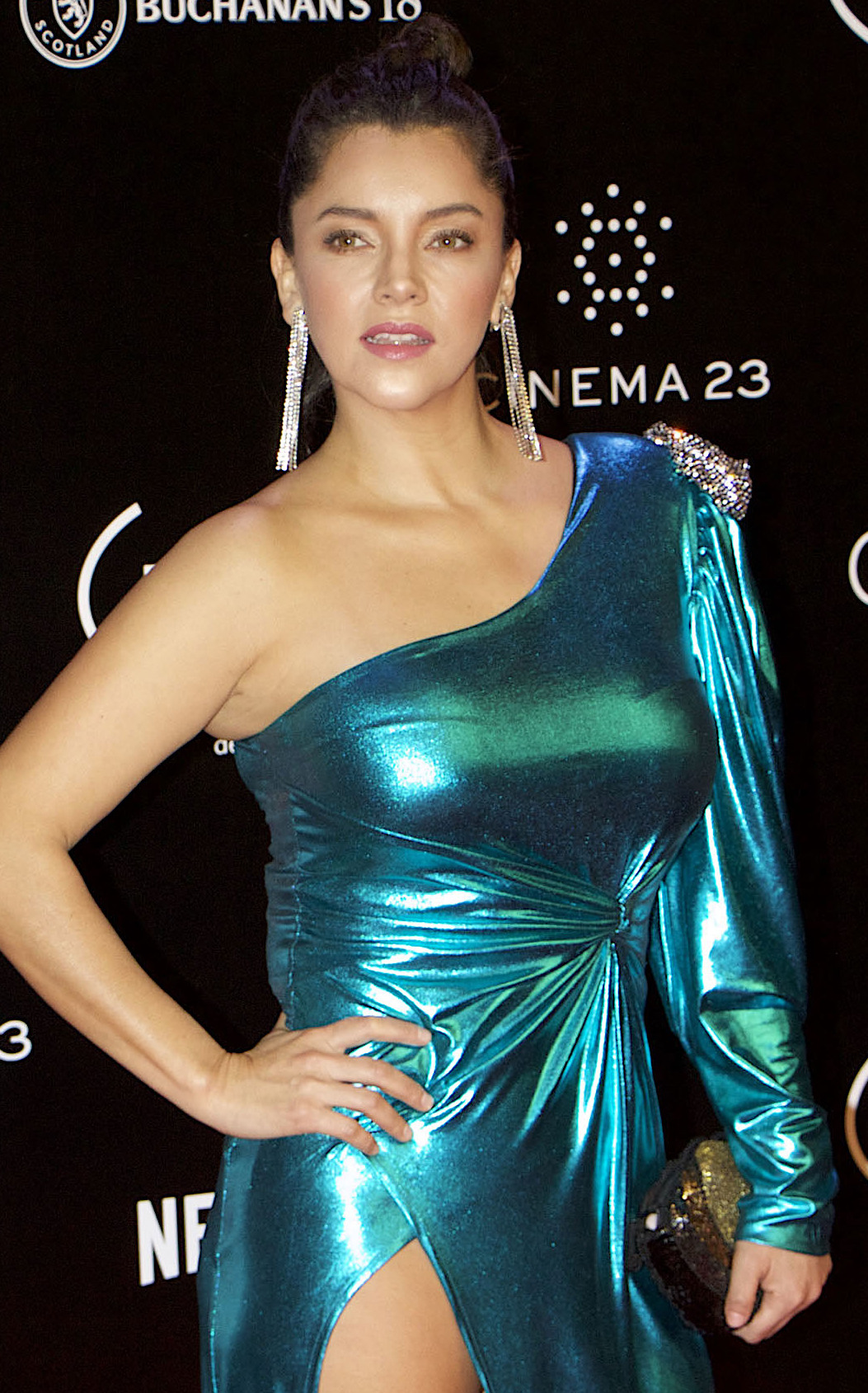
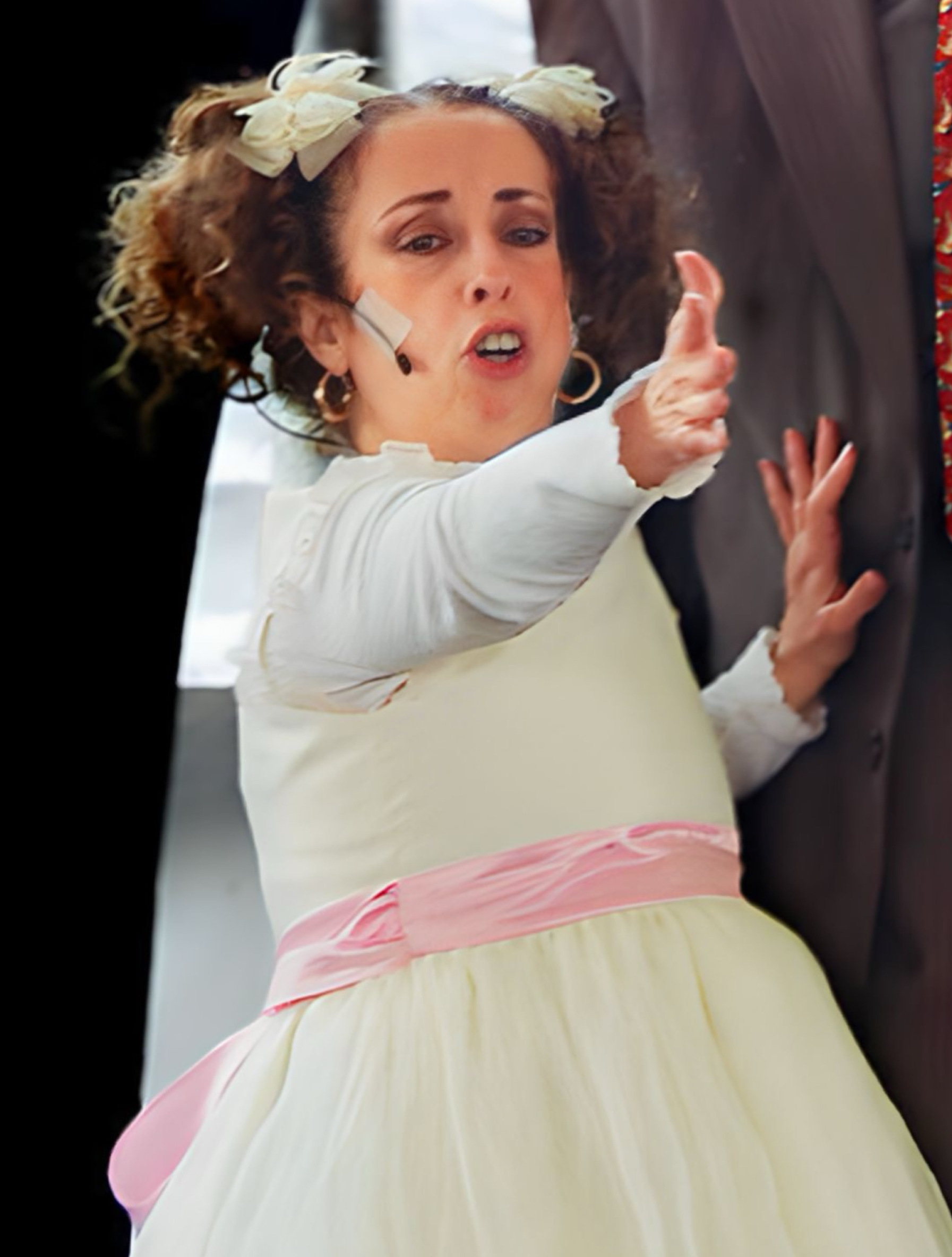
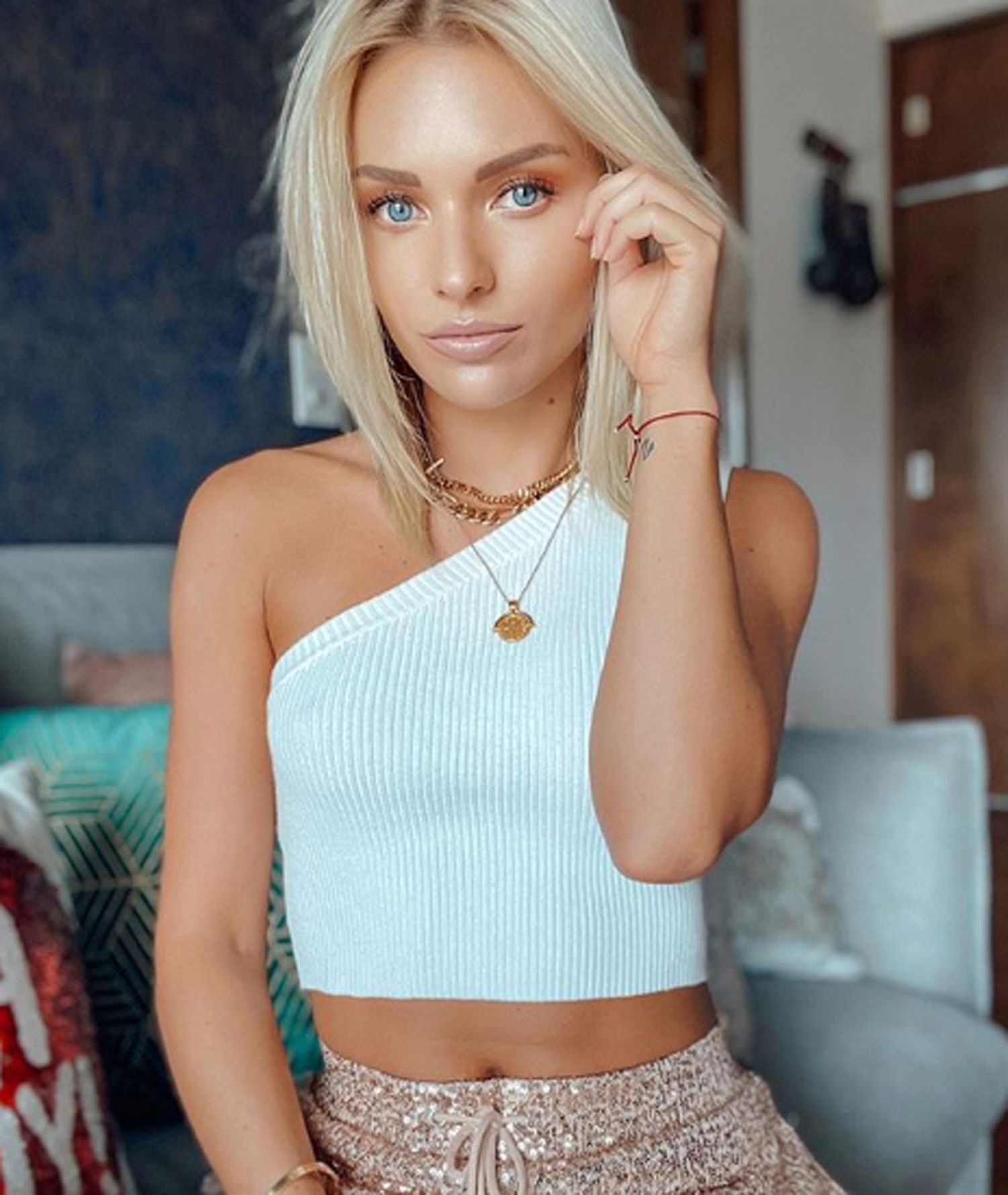
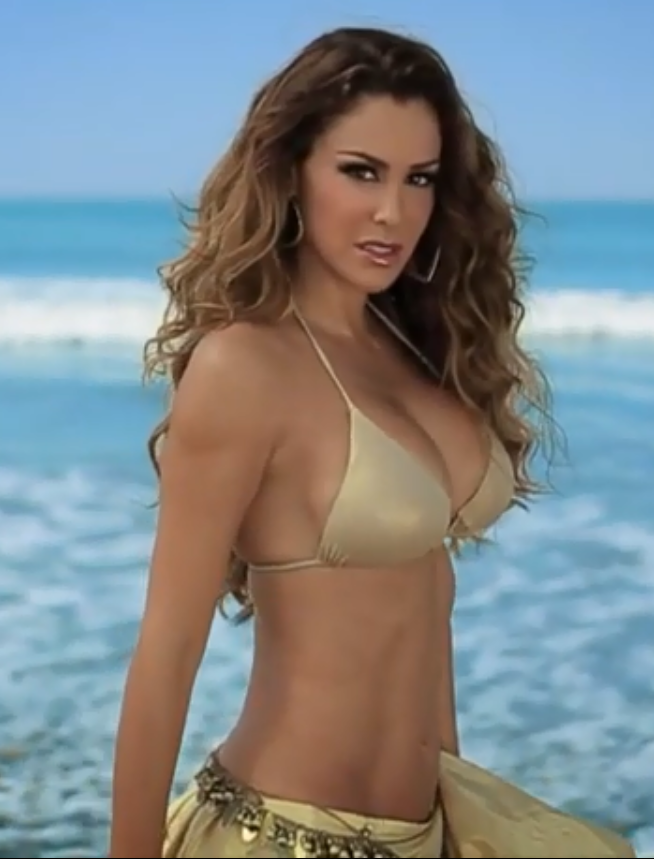
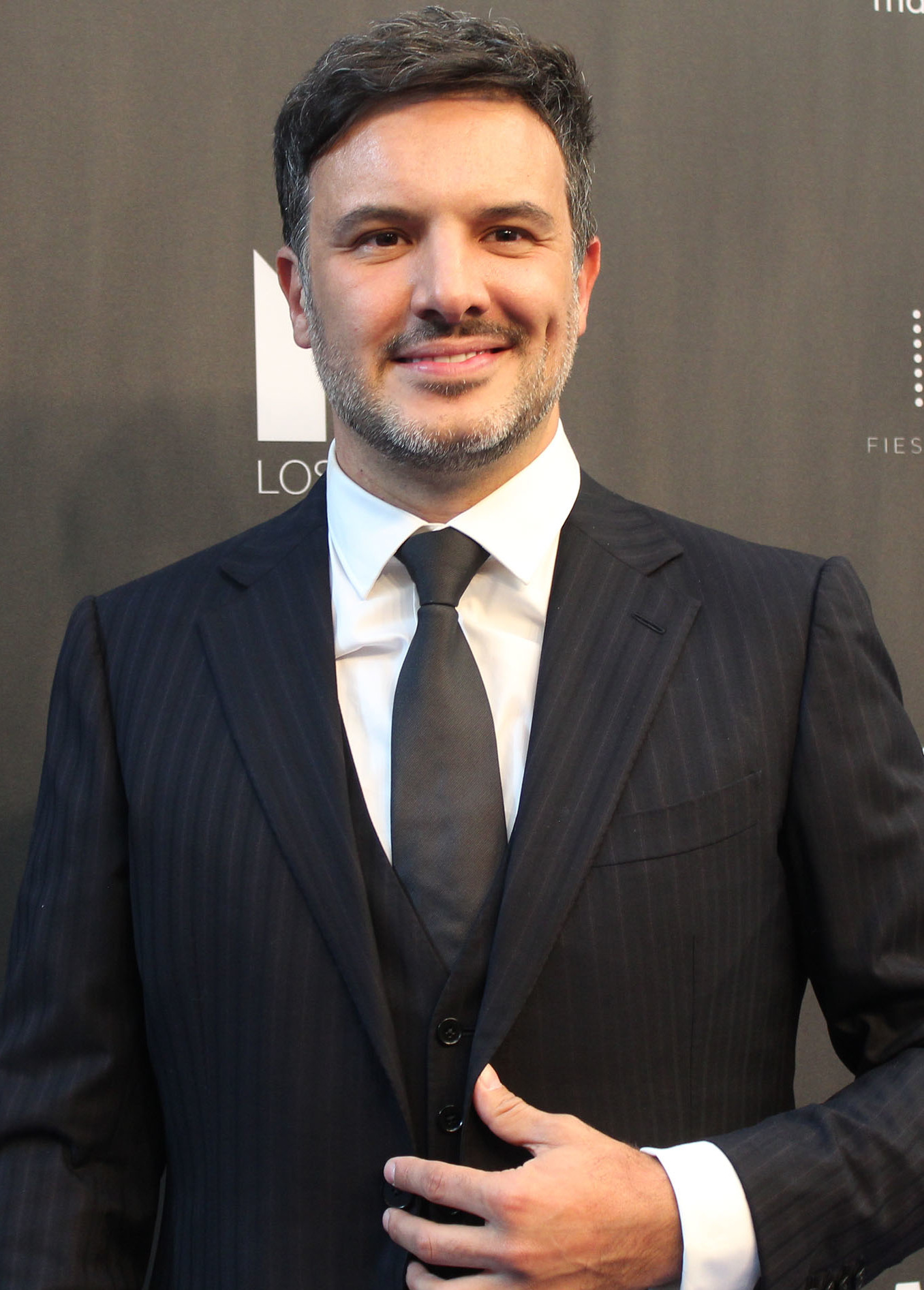
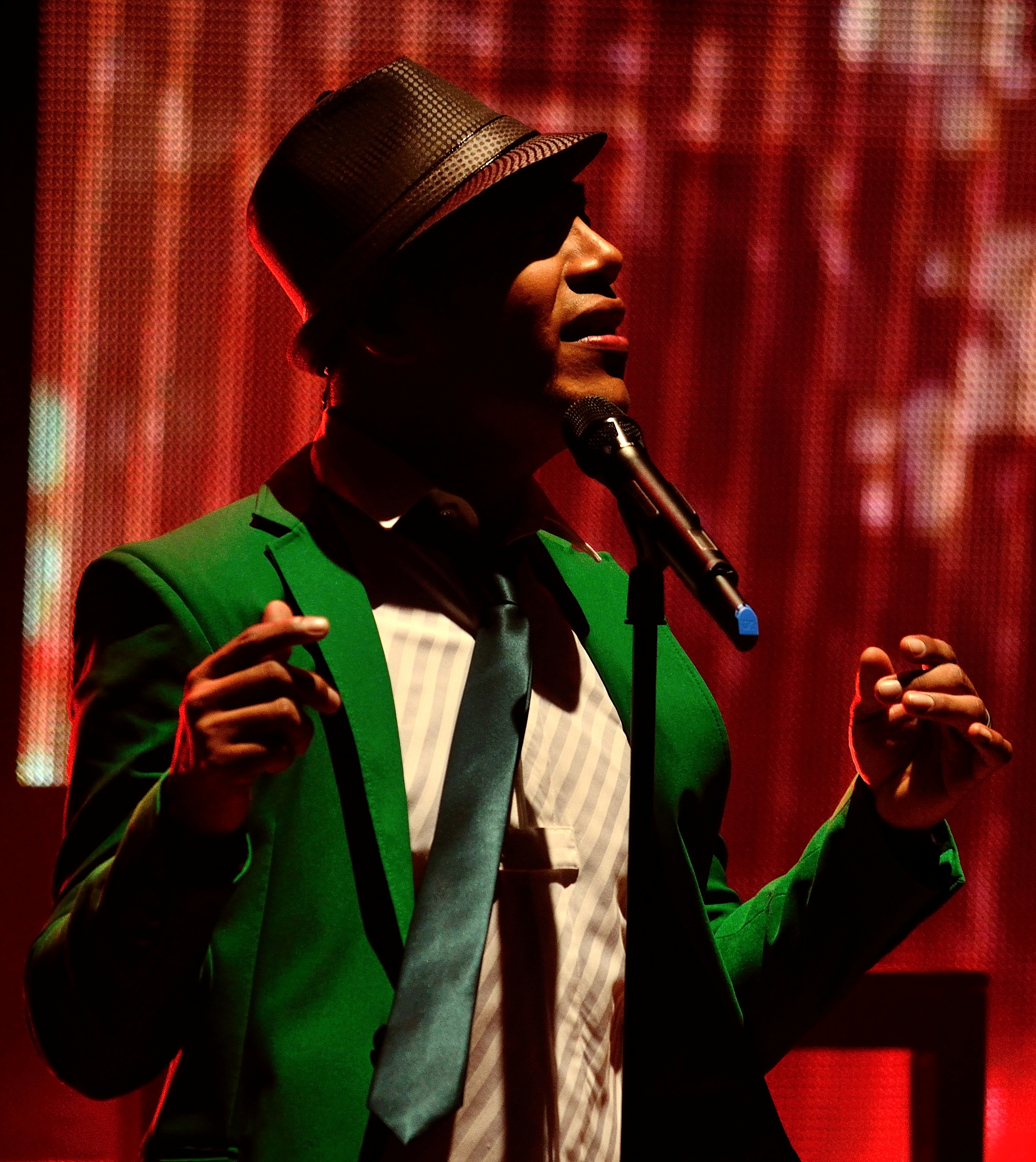
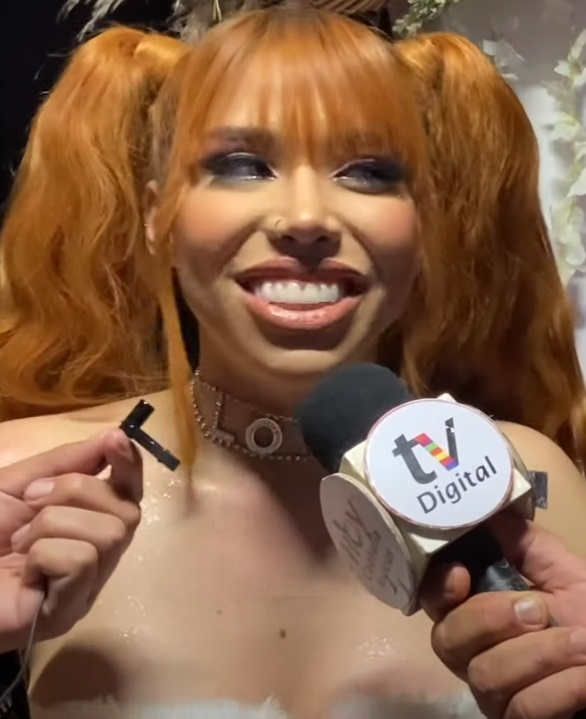
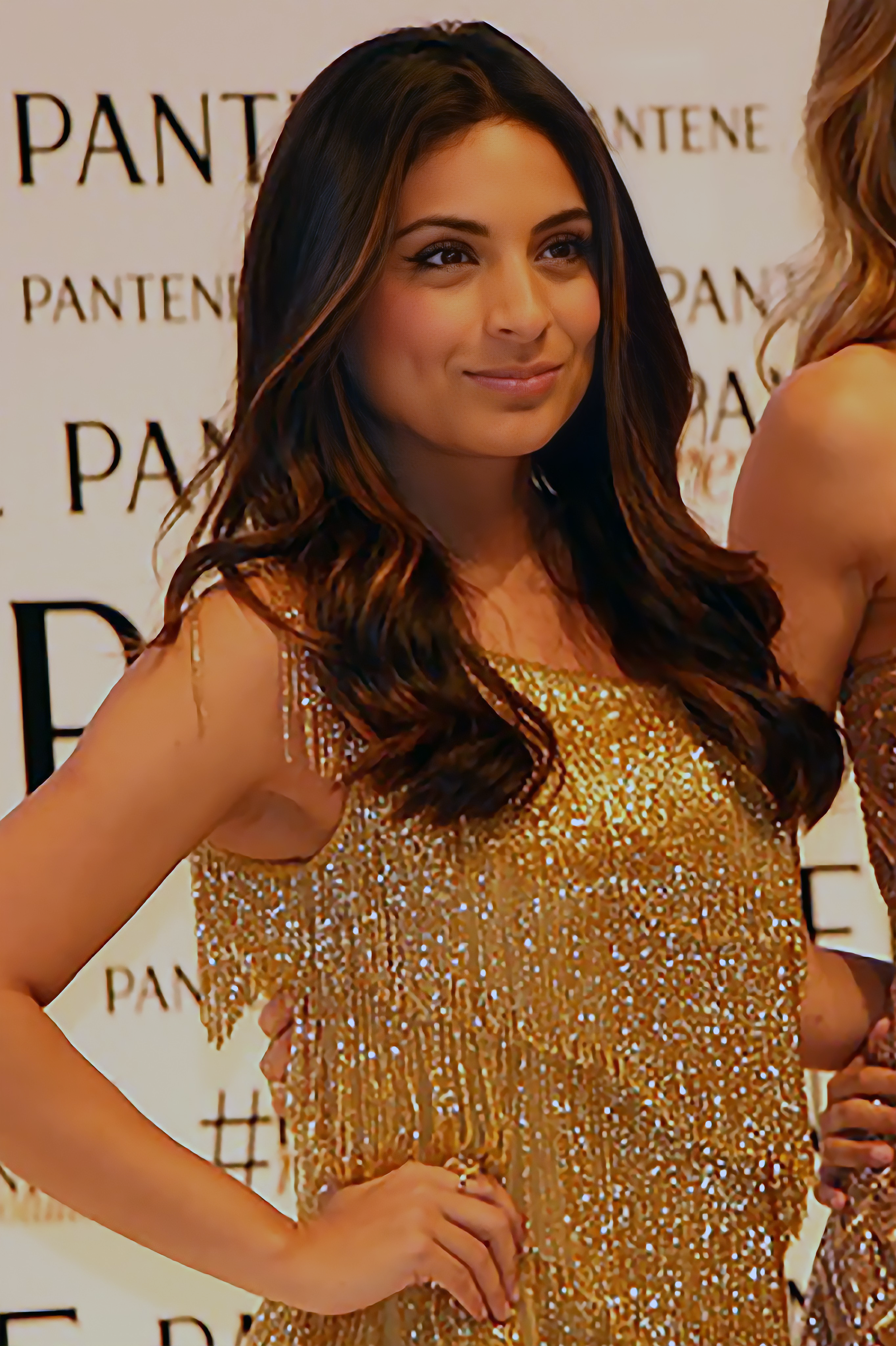
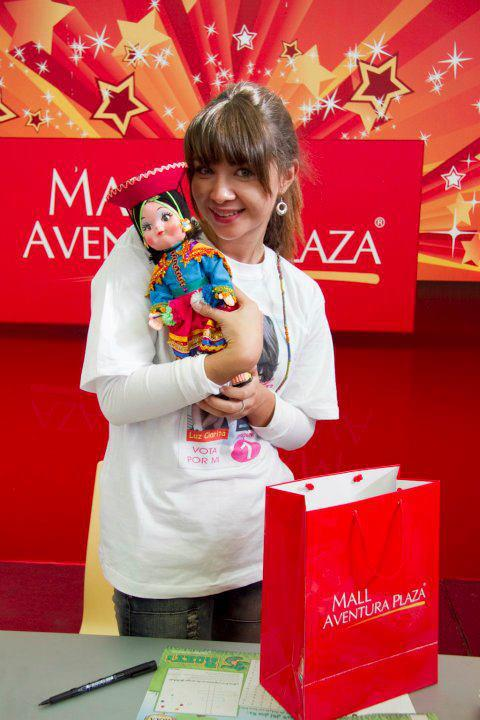
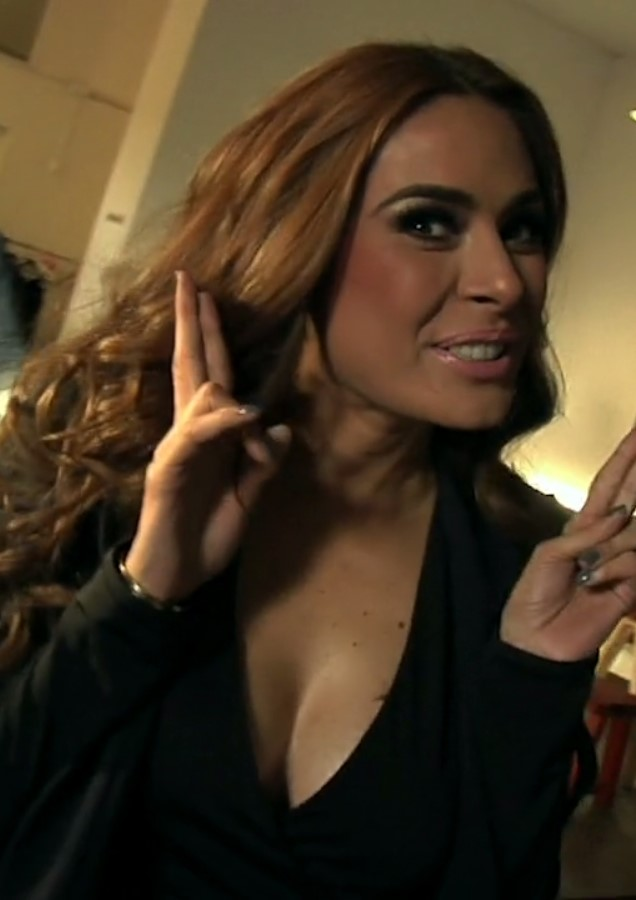
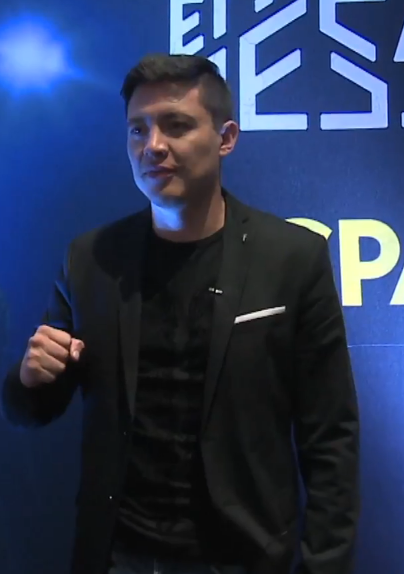
The celebrities who competed in the sixth season of ¿Quién es la máscara?, pictured in order of elimination (L-R):
Marta Sánchez ("Tucán"), Marko ("Micrófono"), Samy Rivers ("Maraña"), Martín Ricca ("Chepino Langostino"), Manelyk González ("Dale Dale"), Sara Maldonado ("Orni"), María Elena Saldaña ("Ricardilla"), Irina Baeva ("Camilo Mandrilo"), Ninel Conde ("Azul"), Alejandro de la Madrid ("Pepe Nador"), Samo ("Robotso"), Yeri Mua ("Tutupótama"), Ana Brenda Contreras ("Ranastacia"), Daniela Luján ("Huesito Peligroso"), Armando Hernández ("Freddie Verdury"), and Galilea Montijo ("Cacahuate Enchilado") Not pictured: El Fantasma ("Erik El Roto"), Cynthia Urías ("María Joacuina"), Edwin Luna ("Venustiano")

== Episodes ==
=== Week 1 (October 20) ===
Performances on the first episode
#	Stage name	Song	Result	
1	Venustiano	"Una Noche en Medellín" by Cris MJ	undisclosed	WIN
2	Robotso	"La Bachata" by Manuel Turizo	undisclosed	RISK
3	Tucán	"Rosa Pastel" by Belanova	Marta Sánchez	OUT
4	Micrófono	"Danza Kuduro" by Don Omar & Lucenzo	Marko	OUT
5	Orni	"Beso" by Rosalía & Rauw Alejandro	undisclosed	RISK
6	Huesito Peligroso	"Lala" by Myke Towers	undisclosed	KEPT
7	Cacahuate Enchilado	"Soy Yo" by Bomba Estéreo	undisclosed	WIN

=== Week 2 (October 27) ===
Performances on the second episode
#	Stage name	Song	Result	
1	Erik El Roto	"Monaco" by Bad Bunny	El Fantasma	OUT
2	Tutupótama	"Moonlight" by Kali Uchis	undisclosed	WIN
3	Ricardilla	"Qlona" by Karol G & Peso Pluma	undisclosed	WIN
4	Pony	"Todos Me Miran" by Gloria Trevi	undisclosed	RISK
5	Dale Dale	"Como la Flor" by Selena	undisclosed	WIN
6	Camilo Mandrilo	"Clandestino" by Shakira & Maluma	undisclosed	WIN

=== Week 3 (November 3) ===
Performances on the third episode
#	Stage name	Song	Result	
1	María Joacuina	"Toxic" by Britney Spears	Cynthia Urías	OUT
2	Pepe Nador	"No Se Va" by Morat	undisclosed	WIN
3	Azul	"Si Antes Te Hubiera Conocido" by Karol G	undisclosed	WIN
4	Ranastacia	"I'm Still Standing" by Elton John	undisclosed	WIN
5	Maraña	"Según Quién" by Maluma & Carín León	undisclosed	WIN
6	Chepino Langostino	"Vagabundo" by Sebastián Yatra, Manuel Turizo & Beéle	undisclosed	RISK
7	Freddie Verdury	"Que Vuelvas" by Carín León & Grupo Frontera	undisclosed	WIN

=== Week 4 (November 10) ===
Performances on the fourth episode
#	Stage name	Song	Result	
1	Robotso	"Despacito" by Luis Fonsi ft. Daddy Yankee	undisclosed	WIN
2	Tutupótama	"Malas Decisiones" by Kenia Os	undisclosed	WIN
3	Maraña	"Desconocidos" by Mau y Ricky, Manuel Turizo & Camilo	Samy Rivers	OUT
4	Orni	"Si Una Vez" by Selena	undisclosed	RISK
5	Pony	"TQG" by Karol G & Shakira	Majo Aguilar	OUT
6	Azul	"Miénteme" by Tini ft. María Becerra	undisclosed	RISK
7	Camilo Mandrilo	"Cupido" by Tini	undisclosed	WIN
8	Pepe Nador	"La Intención" by Christian Nodal & Peso Pluma	undisclosed	KEPT

=== Week 5 (November 17) ===
Performances on the fifth episode
#	Stage name	Song	Result	
1	Freddie Verdury	"Déjala Que Vuelva" by Piso 21 ft. Manuel Turizo	undisclosed	WIN
2	Venustiano	"Dembow" by Danny Ocean	undisclosed	WIN
3	Huesito Peligroso	"El Final de Nuestra Historia" by La Arrolladora Banda El Limón	undisclosed	RISK
4	Chepino Langostino	"Despídase Bien" by Carín León	Martín Ricca	OUT
5	Cacahuate Enchilado	"Rockstar" by Lisa	undisclosed	WIN
6	Ricardilla	"Sabes a Chocolate" by Menudo	undisclosed	KEPT
7	Dale Dale	"Suavecito Suavecito" by Laura León	Manelyk González	OUT
8	Ranastacia	"El Tóxico" by Carín León & Grupo Firme	undisclosed	RISK

=== Week 6 (November 24) - "'80s Night" ===
Performances on the sixth episode
#	Stage name	Song	Result	
1	Freddie Verdury	"Soldado del Amor" by Manuel Mijares	undisclosed	RISK
2	Orni	"Ahora Te Puedes Marchar" by Luis Miguel	Sara Maldonado	OUT
3	Tutupótama	"Material Girl" by Madonna	undisclosed	WIN
4	Ricardilla	"Yo No Te Pido La Luna" by Daniela Romo	María Elena Saldaña	OUT
5	Pepe Nador	"In the Air Tonight" by Phil Collins	undisclosed	RISK
6	Robotso	"Ni Tú Ni Nadie" by Alaska y Dinarama	undisclosed	WIN

=== Week 7 (December 1) - "Telenovela Night" ===
Performances on the seventh episode
#	Stage name	Song	Result	
1	Huesito Peligroso	"Marimar" by Thalía (from Marimar)	undisclosed	WIN
2	Camilo Mandrilo	"Soñadoras" by Sentidos Opuestos (from Soñadoras)	Irina Baeva	OUT
3	Venustiano	"Para Siempre" by Vicente Fernández (from Fuego en la sangre)	undisclosed	RISK
4	Azul	"Rebelde" by RBD (from Rebelde)	Ninel Conde	OUT
5	Ranastacia	"Dos mujeres, un camino" by Laura León (from Dos mujeres, un camino)	undisclosed	RISK
6	Cacahuate Enchilado	"Día de Suerte" by Alejandra Guzmán (from Una familia con suerte)	undisclosed	WIN

=== Week 8 (December 8) - "Regional Mexican Night" ===
Performances on the eighth episode
#	Stage name	Song	Result	
1	Huesito Peligroso	"Frágil" by Yahritza y su Esencia & Grupo Frontera	undisclosed	RISK
2	Robotso	"Tu falta de querer" by Mon Laferte	undisclosed	KEPT
3	Pepe Nador	"Abcdario" by Edén Muñoz & Junior H	Alejandro de la Madrid	OUT
4	Freddie Verdury	"Mi Último Deseo" by Banda Los Recoditos	undisclosed	WIN
5	Cacahuate Enchilado	"Chanel" by Becky G & Peso Pluma	undisclosed	WIN
6	Venustiano	"Primera Cita" by Carín León	Edwin Luna	OUT
7	Ranastacia	"PRC" by Peso Pluma & Natanael Cano	undisclosed	RISK
8	Tutupótama	"Inolvidable" by Jenni Rivera	undisclosed	WIN

=== Week 9 (December 15) ===
Performances on the ninth episode
#	Stage name	Song	Result	
1	Huesito Peligroso	"Vampire" by Olivia Rodrigo	undisclosed	SAFE
2	Robotso	"Ojos Así" by Shakira	Samo	OUT
3	Freddie Verdury	"Hey DJ" by CNCO	undisclosed	SAFE
4	Tutupótama	"Envolver" by Anitta	Yeri Mua	OUT
5	Cacahuate Enchilado	"Gangnam Style" by Psy	undisclosed	SAFE
6	Ranastacia	"Amargura" by Karol G	Ana Brenda Contreras	OUT

=== Week 10 (December 22) ===
Performances on the tenth episode
#	Stage name	Song	Identity	Result
Round One
1	Huesito Peligroso	"Nunca Es Suficiente" by Natalia Lafourcade & Los Ángeles Azules	Daniela Luján	THIRD
2	Freddie Verdury	"Provenza" by Karol G	undisclosed	SAFE
3	Cacahuate Enchilado	"Espresso" by Sabrina Carpenter	undisclosed	SAFE
Round Two
4	Freddie Verdury	"Azúcar amargo" by Fey	Armando Hernández	WINNER
5	Cacahuate Enchilado	"Solo Se Vive Una Vez" by Mónica Naranjo	Galilea Montijo	RUNNER-UP

== Ratings ==
Show	Episode	Air date	Timeslot (CT)	Viewers (millions)
1	"Siete personalidades"	October 20, 2024	Sunday; 8:30 p.m.	2.99
2	"Nuevos personajes"	October 27, 2024	Sunday; 8:30 p.m.	2.61
3	"Personajes de fantasia"	November 3, 2024	Sunday; 8:30 p.m.	2.47
4	"El poder del juez"	November 10, 2024	Sunday; 8:30 p.m.	2.69
5	"Un boton, muchas consecuencias"	November 17, 2024	Sunday; 8:30 p.m.	2.51
6	"Un nuevo juez"	November 24, 2024	Sunday; 8:30 p.m.	2.53
7	"Noche de telenovela"	December 1, 2024	Sunday; 8:30 p.m.	2.28
8	"Al estilo ranchero"	December 8, 2024	Sunday; 8:30 p.m.	N/A
9	"Semifinal"	December 15, 2024	Sunday; 8:30 p.m.	N/A
10	"La gran final"	December 22, 2024	Sunday; 8:00 p.m.	N/A
