= Ni tú ni yo (film) =

2018 film by Noé Santillán-López

- Directed by: Noé Santillán-López
- Written by: Mauricio Argüelles; César Rodríguez
- Starring: Mauricio Argüelles; César Rodríguez; Bárbara de Regil; Alfonso Herrera
- Cinematography: Mario Gallegos
- Edited by: Rodrigo Zozaya
- Music by: Juan Carlos Enríquez
- Production company: Época Films
- Distributed by: Corazón Films
- Release date: 12 October 2018 (Mexico)
- Country: Mexico
- Language: Spanish

Ni tú ni yo is a 2018 Mexican comedy film directed by Noé Santillán-López. The film is written and starring César Rodríguez and Mauricio Argüelles, along with Bárbara de Regil, Alfonso Herrera, and Rocío Verdejo. The story revolves around Guadalupe Martínez best known in the world of wrestling as "El Halcón Negro", a young Mexican considered by many as the best fighter in his branch, and Gabino better known as "El Conejo", both are two brothers who have been separated for many years because of Gabino's additions, but together they will rejoin to prevent Guadalupe from losing her recognition as the best fighter. It premiered on 12 October 2018 in Mexico.

== Cast ==
- César Rodríguez as Gabino "El Conejo"
- Mauricio Argüelles as Guadalupe Martínez "El Halcón Negro"
- Bárbara de Regil as Miranda
- Alfonso Herrera as himself
- Arnulfo Reyes Sánchez as Malandro
- Alejandro Calva as Don Archibaldo
- Rocío Verdejo as Mónica
- José Sefami as Joaquín
- Fabiola Guajardo as Actress
- Ana paula Martínez as Giovanna
