= Juan Carlos Olivas =

Mexican actor

Juan Carlos Olivas was a Mexican actor known for playing Héctor Luis Palma Salazar in the 2017 Netflix and Univision series El Chapo. Olivas died in April 2018 due to cancer. Rest in peace.
