= MexZombies =

- Film Poster
- Directed by: Chava Cartas
- Written by: Luis Gamboa; Santiago Limón
- Produced by: Ruth Cherem Daniel; Francisco González Compeán; Concepcion Taboada
- Starring: Iñaki Godoy; Marcelo Barceló; Roberta Damián; Luciana Vale; Vicent Webb; Daniel Tovar; Bárbara de Regil
- Cinematography: Beto Casillas
- Edited by: Jorge Macaya
- Music by: Luca Ortega
- Production company: Draco Films
- Distributed by: Vix+
- Release date: October 26, 2022
- Running time: 88 minutes
- Country: Mexico
- Language: Spanish
- Budget: $1.7 million

MexZombies is a 2022 Mexican thriller comedy horror film directed by Chava Cartas and written by Luis Gamboa & Santiago Limón. Starring Iñaki Godoy, Marcelo Barceló, Roberta Damián, Luciana Vale, Vincent Webb, Daniel Tovar and Bárbara de Regil. It was commercially released on October 26, 2022 on Vix+.

== Synopsis ==
A group of teenagers who, little by little, have been making their way through life. Together they have organized the most popular party of their generation to celebrate the Day of the Dead, but between costumes, loud music and children asking for candy, no one has realized that the zombie apocalypse has arisen in their private house. Some believe that these beings are part of the party itself, but when things get out of control, the group will have to unite in a series of unexpected and dangerous adventures. Will they have what it takes to take down the brain lovers?

== Cast ==
The actors participating in this film are:

- Iñaki Godoy as Tavo
- Marcelo Barceló as Cronos
- Roberta Damián as Ana
- Luciana Vale as Rex
- Vicent Webb as Johnny
- Alejandro Puente as Deivid
- Daniel Tovar as Lalo
- Diego Jáuregui as Don Segis
- Bárbara de Regil as Chief Vargas
- Darío Rippoll as papá de Cronos
- Guillermo Fernández (vigilante que escapa en carrito)

== Production ==
Principal photography of the film began on July 4, 2019 in Durango, filming lasted approximately 6 to 8 weeks.

== Release ==
A theatrical release was scheduled for the second half of 2020, but due to the COVID-19 pandemic it was cancelled. Subsequently, MexZombies was released on October 26, 2022 on Vix+. Prior to its official premiere, it was screened at various film festivals in October 2022, such as the Brussels International Fantastic Film Festival or the Toronto After Dark Film Festival.
