= Erika de la Rosa =

Mexican actress and model

Erika de la Rosa is a Mexican actress and model.

== Filmography ==
Film
Year	Title	Character	Notes
2014	¿Qué le dijiste a Dios?	Marcela	Debut film

Television
Year	Title	Character	Notes
2003	La hija del jardinero	Clara "Clarita"	Recurring role
2004	La vida es una canción	Angélica	Recurring role
2007	Se busca un hombre	Tania Wilkins	Recurring role
2007	Lo que callamos las mujeres		Episode: "Secretos de familia"
2008	Cambio de vida	Cristina	Two episodes
2008	Deseo prohibido	Mayté Wilson	Series regular
2009	Cada quien su santo		Episode: "Desde arriba"
2009-2010	Pasión Morena	Isela Terán	Recurring role
2011	Emperatriz	Dr. Ximena	Guest star
2013	La patrona	Irene Montemar	Antagonist / Co-Protagonist
2014	El Señor de los Cielos	Elsa Marín	Guest star
2015-2016	Bajo el mismo cielo	Felicia Méndez	Series regular
2016	Eva la trailera	Marlene Palacios	Series regular
2017	Guerra de ídolos	Selva Trevino	Recurring role
2017-2018	Caer en tentación	Alina del Villar	Series regular
2019	Cuna de lobos	Passport forgers	Guest star
2019-2020	Médicos	Mireya Navarro	Series regular
2022-2023	Amores que engañan	Laura Nora	Episode: "Mía solo mía" Episode: "¿Dónde están mis hijos?"
2023-2025	Pacto de sangre	Miranda	Main role
2024	El Conde: Amor y honor	Paulina de Zambrano	Series regular
2025	Los hilos del pasado	Roberta	Recurring role
2026	Corazón de oro	Elisa Arango Nova	Series regular
2026	La oficina	Juana	Series regular

== Theatre ==
- 2010: Cinco mujeres usando el mismo vestido
- 2016: El Beso del Jabali de Eduardo H.Roman
