= The Imperfects =

Canadian science fiction television series

- Promotional poster
- Genre: Drama; Science fiction; Superhero
- Created by: Shelley Eriksen; Dennis Heaton
- Starring: Italia Ricci; Morgan Taylor Campbell; Rhianna Jagpal; Iñaki Godoy; Kyra Zagorsky; Jedidiah Goodacre; Rhys Nicholson; Celina Martin
- Composer: Patric Caird
- Country of origin: Canada
- Original language: English
- No. of seasons: 1
- No. of episodes: 10

Production
- Executive producers: Chad Oakes; Michael Frislev; Dennis Heaton; Shelley Eriksen
- Producers: Jay Daniel Beechinor; Morris Chapdelaine; Todd Giroux; Justis Greene; Gorrman Lee
- Cinematography: Mark Chow; William Minsky
- Editors: Justin Li; Sabrina Pitre; Jamie Alain
- Running time: 39–45 minutes
- Production company: Nomadic Pictures

Original release
- Network: Netflix
- Release: September 8, 2022

The Imperfects is a Canadian superhero science fiction television series created by Dennis Heaton and Shelley Eriksen that premiered on Netflix on September 8, 2022. Promoted as a "coming of rage" story, it follows three young adults pursuing the mad scientist who tampered with their DNA, resulting in disruptive superpowers. In November 2022, the series was canceled after one season.

== Synopsis ==
Three Seattle-based adults, Abbi, a scientist, Juan, a comic book artist, and Tilda, a singer, are turned into monsters after undergoing an experimental gene therapy. The trio subsequently decides to hunt down the scientist responsible for their transformation, Dr. Alex Sarkov, and force him to make them human again. They are joined by Dr. Sydney Burke, a scientist who assists them in their quest.

== Cast and characters ==
=== Main ===
- Italia Ricci as Dr. Sydney Burke, a scientist and the estranged former partner of Dr. Sarkov; the two worked on a synthetic stem cell project together
- Morgan Taylor Campbell as Tilda Weber, the lead vocalist in a punk rock band who develops enhanced hearing and the powers of a banshee through sonic screams
- Rhianna Jagpal as Abbi Singh, a genetics student who develops the powers of a succubus through pheromones that cause people to be uncontrollably attracted to and easily influenced by her
- Iñaki Godoy as Juan Ruiz, a comic book artist who develops the powers of a werewolf-esque chupacabra by temporarily shapeshifting
- Kyra Zagorsky as Isabel Finch, a mysterious woman with a grudge against Dr. Sarkov. She is also Burke's Hyde-like alter ego.
- Jedidiah Goodacre as P.J., the lead guitarist in Tilda's punk rock band and her boyfriend
- Rhys Nicholson as Dr. Alex Sarkov, a rogue scientist who unethically experimented on his patients with synthetic stem cell therapy, leading to many of them developing powers as side effects
  - Nicholson also portrays Dr. Hallenbeck, a mysterious figure connected to Dr. Sarkov
- Celina Martin as Hannah Moore, a barista and former "failed experiment" of Dr. Sarkov who didn't develop powers like the other patients

=== Recurring ===
- Junnicia Lagoutin as Darcy Cobourg, Juan's girlfriend
- Ron Selmour as Jim Sponson, a high-ranking operative for Flux tasked with hunting down Sarkov's former patients
- Rekha Sharma as Dr. Dominique Crain, chief science officer for the secret government organization known as Flux

=== Guest ===
- Max Lloyd-Jones as Doug, one of Dr. Sarkov's former patients whose side effect power is rapid regenerative healing. He is tasked with surveilling Sarkov's other patients.
- Ben Francis as Simon, the drummer in Tilda's punk rock band
- Veronica Long as Rose, the rhythm guitarist and backup singer in Tilda's punk rock band
- John Cassini as Dr. Brian Yake, an estranged former colleague of Dr. Burke
- Kai Bradbury as Dr. Nathaniel Lang, the leader of a trio of biohackers who hunt Sarkov's former patients
- Louriza Tronco as Qamara, a biohacker working with Nathaniel
- Naika Toussaint as Melanie, a biohacker working with Nathaniel
- Wesley MacInnes as Owen Schultz, one of Dr. Sarkov's former patients whose side effect power makes his skin invulnerable. He is also a self-declared "superhero".
- Jennifer Cheon Garcia as Sonja Benning, an operative for Flux who impersonates a law enforcement agent
- Diego Stredel as Alejandro Ruiz, Juan's estranged older brother and Paloma's father
- Danika Athenea Williston (Note: Credited as just "Danika Williston" in the episodes "All Monsters Attack" and "Destroy All Monsters".) as Paloma, Juan's precocious niece and Alejandro and Renata's daughter
- Michelle Morgan as Betsy, Zoe's mother, who is searching for her missing daughter
- MaeMae Renfrow as Zoe, one of Dr. Sarkov's former patients whose side effect power is electrokinesis. She is unable to control her abilities, which results in the deaths of multiple people.
- Siddhartha Minhas as Ben Singh, Abbi's younger brother
- Kandyse McClure as Dr. Monday, a roboticist who develops a new advanced form of nanorobotics
- Manuela Sosa as Renata, Alejandro's wife and Paloma's mother

== Episodes ==
No.	Title	Directed by	Written by	Original release date
1	"Sarkov's Children"	Mathias Herndl	Shelley Eriksen & Dennis Heaton	September 8, 2022
Singer Tilda Weber, genetics student Abbi Singh, and art student Juan Ruiz stop receiving medication for their Acute Genetic Decay Syndrome (AGDS) in the mail, and start developing strange and unwelcome conditions. Tilda develops hyperacusis and concussive screams; Abbi secretes pheromones that drive those around her to be dangerously obsessed with her; and Juan uncontrollably transforms into a violent beast he calls a chupacabras. Their doctor, Alex Sarkov, disappears and can't be reached. Dr. Sydney Burke, who worked with Sarkov to devise their treatment, explains to the three youths that they were test subjects for the gene therapy they received in their childhood. Sarkov deliberately withdrew their medication to see if they developed side effects, and Burke agrees to try and develop a cure for them. They are menaced by a strange man who has been stalking them, only for Juan to transform and maul him. However, he resuscitates himself, demanding to see Sarkov.
2	"Doug of the Dead"	Mathias Herndl	Shelley Eriksen & Dennis Heaton	September 8, 2022
The man, Doug, is revealed to be another of Sarkov's test subjects, with the side effect of rapid cellular regeneration and an inability to permanently die. He tracked down the other test subjects for Sarkov in the hopes of being cured, and cuts a deal to cooperate with them in exchange for a final and painless death. Burke intends to use acid to end Doug's life, prompting Tilda to release him from his restraints, after which he blows himself up. The information he gives helps the group track down a fellow test subject, Hannah Moore, whose immune system rejected the gene therapy that gives the others their side effects. However, she has no leads on Sarkov's whereabouts. Later, a woman named Isabel Finch (previously seen arguing with Sarkov) approaches Hannah, recruiting her in a vendetta against unethical scientists. Tilda and her boyfriend PJ have a falling out, and Juan's girlfriend Darcy walks in on him while he's transformed. Meanwhile, Burke decides to stop treating her illness, and starts sleepwalking and having disturbing nightmares.
3	"Portland Warehouse Massacre"	Julien Christian Lutz	LA Smith	September 8, 2022
Darcy is unscathed after her encounter with Juan's beastly form, and becomes obsessed with it, to his chagrin. Hannah believes she is assisting Finch with minor crimes against unethical scientists, but Finch is murdering them. Burke contacts fellow scientist Dr. Brian Yake for help with research. Finch appropriates dangerous chemicals from Burke's house, using them to kill Yake before he can share his findings with Burke. Tilda, Abbi, and Juan travel to crash an appointment between Sarkov and another test subject, but it turns out to be a trap set by biohackers to study them and sell their research to Flux, a quasi-government science agency suppressing dangerous experimentation. The three youths are captured but manage to escape, seemingly killing their captors. A transformed Juan flees alone, leaving Tilda and Abbi to return to Burke's house with the biohackers' research in tow. Later, a Flux agent arrives to clean up the biohackers' hideout.
4	"One of Us"	Julien Christian Lutz	Steve Cochrane	September 8, 2022
One of Sarkov's test subjects who also suffers from side effects, Owen Schultz, appears at Burke's house. He finds Hannah sneaking around Burke's residence and apprehends her, revealing that Sarkov sent him to help. Owen's condition intensifies, sending him into a murderous rage, but he is subdued. They take Owen's phone as a means of contacting Sarkov, and send him away with medication to suppress his rage. Burke receives news of Yake's death and Abbi shares with Hannah the troubles her group is facing. Under orders from lead scientist Dr. Dominique Crain, Flux agents seize research from the biohackers' hideout. Meanwhile, Juan heads to his estranged brother Alejandro's house, but Alejandro is called away, entrusting his daughter Paloma's safety to Juan. Frustrated at being kept in the dark, Darcy informs a Flux agent masquerading as a police officer of Juan's whereabouts. Sponson, a Flux agent sent to collect Juan, menaces Paloma, and is repelled by the chupacabras, whom Juan realizes only comes out when his loved ones are in danger. Juan reconciles with his brother, resolving to put the past behind him. He later realizes he's able to retain consciousness in his chupacabras form and transform at will.
5	"Zoe Must Be Destroyed"	Mark Chow	Kor Adana	September 8, 2022
Tilda and Juan track Sarkov to one of the San Juan Islands, where they find several missing persons cases starting from when Sarkov took residence there. They stop Sarkov from killing another test subject, Zoe, who flees. Sarkov races to find and kill her before her side effect kills others, while Tilda and Juan try to dissuade him from violence. He explains that AGDS is a result of human evolution failing to keep up with climate change, and his efforts to create a superior genome are driven by the necessity to overcome this discrepancy before humanity goes extinct. The island residents form a mob and capture Sarkov, but Tilda and Juan locate Zoe and safely reunite her with her mother, and the mob turns Sarkov over to them. Now knowing she's an accomplice to murder, Hannah tells Abbi and Burke the truth. Burke discovers supplies and spoils stashed by Finch in her own house, and the group concludes that she is Finch's next target. Finch later appears, but Abbi and Hannah are able to restrain her. After Tilda, Juan, and Sarkov return to Burke's house, Finch shapeshifts into Burke, who has no memory of her actions as Finch.
6	"Lest Ye Become a Monster"	Mark Chow	Kim Garland	September 8, 2022
Tilda is annoyed that Burke kept her own AGDS diagnosis from the youths, lashing out at Hannah. Despite knowing it will advance Sarkov's eugenics work, Burke offers herself as a test subject while he devises a cure for AGDS and the side effects. Flux agents lay siege to Burke's house, threatening to kill them all unless those suffering from side effects go with them. Fed up with Tilda's abrasive personality, Hannah gets shot as she attempts to leave the house. To save her, Abbi administers to Hannah the same gene therapy that gave Doug his side effects. Tilda, Abbi, and Juan defend the house, buying time for Burke and Sarkov to develop the cure. The agents breach the house to determine the limitations of the youths' side effects, and Hannah seemingly dies. A furious Abbi emits new pheromones that induce rage, leading a charge against the agents. Hannah resuscitates herself and joins the fray. To protect Sarkov and the youths, Burke turns herself in to Flux, but not before appealing to Sarkov's sense of morality to make him promise to work on the cure.
7	"Cure All"	Nimisha Mukerji	Gorrman Lee	September 8, 2022
In Flux's custody, Burke is tasked by Crain to prove the worth of her unique biology. After acknowledging Finch as part of her, the two are able to communicate and swap forms at will. Hannah experiences constant pain as part of her side effect and is furious at Abbi for administering the gene therapy without her consent. Abbi investigates a new monster that has been savaging civilians in Seattle, and discovers that her own emotional state affects the behavior her pheromones induce in others. The monster injects Juan with a hallucinogenic neurotoxin that makes him attempt to kill Darcy, ending their relationship. The same neurotoxin causes Tilda's boyfriend PJ to die in a car accident shortly after they reconcile. The youths deduce that the culprit is biohacker Dr. Nathaniel Lang, who survived the Portland Warehouse Massacre, was mutated by his own experiments, and is now out for revenge. He holds Hannah hostage in exchange for being cured of his side effects, so the youths deliver Sarkov's completed cure and rescue Hannah. As revenge, Tilda kills a cured Nate. During a conversation with Sarkov, Tilda starts to see his point of view.
8	"The Devil You Know"	Nimisha Mukerji	Gorrman Lee	September 8, 2022
Sarkov intends to disseminate the cure on a global scale to rewrite the human genome, withholding it from the youths unless they help him steal nanobot technology. Influenced by Sarkov, Tilda starts to embrace her side effects and their fatal applications, worrying Abbi and Juan. After stealing it, they argue over whether to give Sarkov the technology and stop at a motel en route to Seattle to decide on a course of action. Tilda gets the others drunk under the guise of celebrating their imminent return to normal life, but double-crosses them and delivers a nanobot printer to Sarkov. While chasing them, Abbi and Juan realize the nanobots intend to subjugate humanity, spelling drastic consequences if they're used to disseminate the cure. Returning to Burke's house, Abbi resolves to make the cure herself. Crain realizes Burke is stalling for time and transfers her from a lab to a holding cell, intending to experiment on her. Deducing that Crain wants Sarkov to infect the world, Burch escapes Flux with Finch's help. However, Crain removes Burke's control over Finch, causing them to randomly shift between forms.
9	"All Monsters Attack"	Dennis Heaton	Dennis Heaton	September 8, 2022
Abbi insists on devising the cure while Juan prioritizes stopping Sarkov, and they part ways. Juan texts Tilda about the dangers of using the nanobots, and she realizes that she's making the wrong choice helping Sarkov. When Sarkov insists on using the nanobots, Tilda destroys the printer. Juan attends his niece's birthday party but leaves to find Tilda, and his furious brother cuts ties with him. Abbi becomes distraught at the news that her mother might have cancer. She botches an attempt to use her pheromones on Hannah to get help with the cure, and they part on bad terms. Finch's body starts to deteriorate, putting pressure on her and Burke to cure themselves. Burke returns home to help Abbi with the cure, but Finch sabotages her work, forcing her to pursue Sarkov. Burke and Sarkov's friendship is explored in a series of flashbacks, revealing that his amorality is related to being raised in a bioengineering lab. Juan and Abbi reconcile, reunite, and deduce Sarkov's location. They head there with Finch, who betrays them. She bargains to have Sarkov permanently suppress Burke's persona in exchange for an alternative transmission route for the cure. Sarkov fatally shoots Tilda for her betrayal.
10	"Destroy All Monsters"	Dennis Heaton	Dennis Heaton	September 8, 2022
Sarkov kidnaps Burke and Juan, fleeing his hideout to experiment on the latter and devise a cure for Finch. Tilda resuscitates herself, having incidentally been given the immortality gene. Sponson ambushes her and Abbi, but they decide to share information and posit that Flux may be working with Sarkov. At Sarkov's clinic, Tilda and Abbi interrupt Sarkov and administer the cure to Juan and Finch, seemingly curing their AGDS and removing their side effects. Sponson interrogates Sarkov, learning that Flux has been funding him and other rogue scientists. Crain is detained for questioning, and Sarkov is taken under Flux's custody. Tilda refuses the cure, taking up vigilantism to protect victims of unethical experimentation. A cured Abbi starts a relationship with Hannah, and resolves to tie up the loose ends created by Sarkov's work. Juan chronicles Tilda's exploits in graphic novels. Months later, a virus sweeps Seattle, and Juan and Abbi develop further mutations. Burke replaces Crain as Flux's lead scientist, recruiting Sarkov to work for her, but it's revealed that while she has Burke's outward appearance, Finch's persona is in control. She reports to Dr. Hallenbeck, a mysterious figure of whom Sarkov is a clone.

== Production ==
=== Development ===
On April 16, 2021, Netflix gave production a straight-to-series order consisting of ten episodes. The show is created by Dennis Heaton and Shelley Eriksen, who are expected to executive produce alongside Chad Oakes and Michael Frislev. Nomadic Pictures is the company involved with producing the series. The show bases the main characters' powers on those of legendary creatures, such as the banshee, succubus, and chupacabra. Filming took place in Vancouver. The series premiered on September 8, 2022. On November 8, 2022, Netflix canceled the series after one season.

=== Casting ===
Upon series-order announcement, Italia Ricci, Morgan Taylor Campbell, Rhianna Jagpal, Iñaki Godoy, Rhys Nicholson, Celina Martin, and Kyra Zagorsky were cast to star.

== Reception ==
The Imperfects received positive reviews from critics and audiences.

Liz Kocan of Decider called this show "fine." She praised the story as "decent" and noted that the show reminds of a "mashup of X-Men, Fringe, and Riverdale, in that it blends the plot devices of genetically modified mutant youths, supernatural beings, and dark, sometimes dangerous teen angst into one show." Stephanie Morgan of Common Sense Media gave the show three stars out of five, describing it as "Fast-paced anti-hero monster action; language and gore."
