= Iñaki Godoy =

Mexican actor (born 2003)

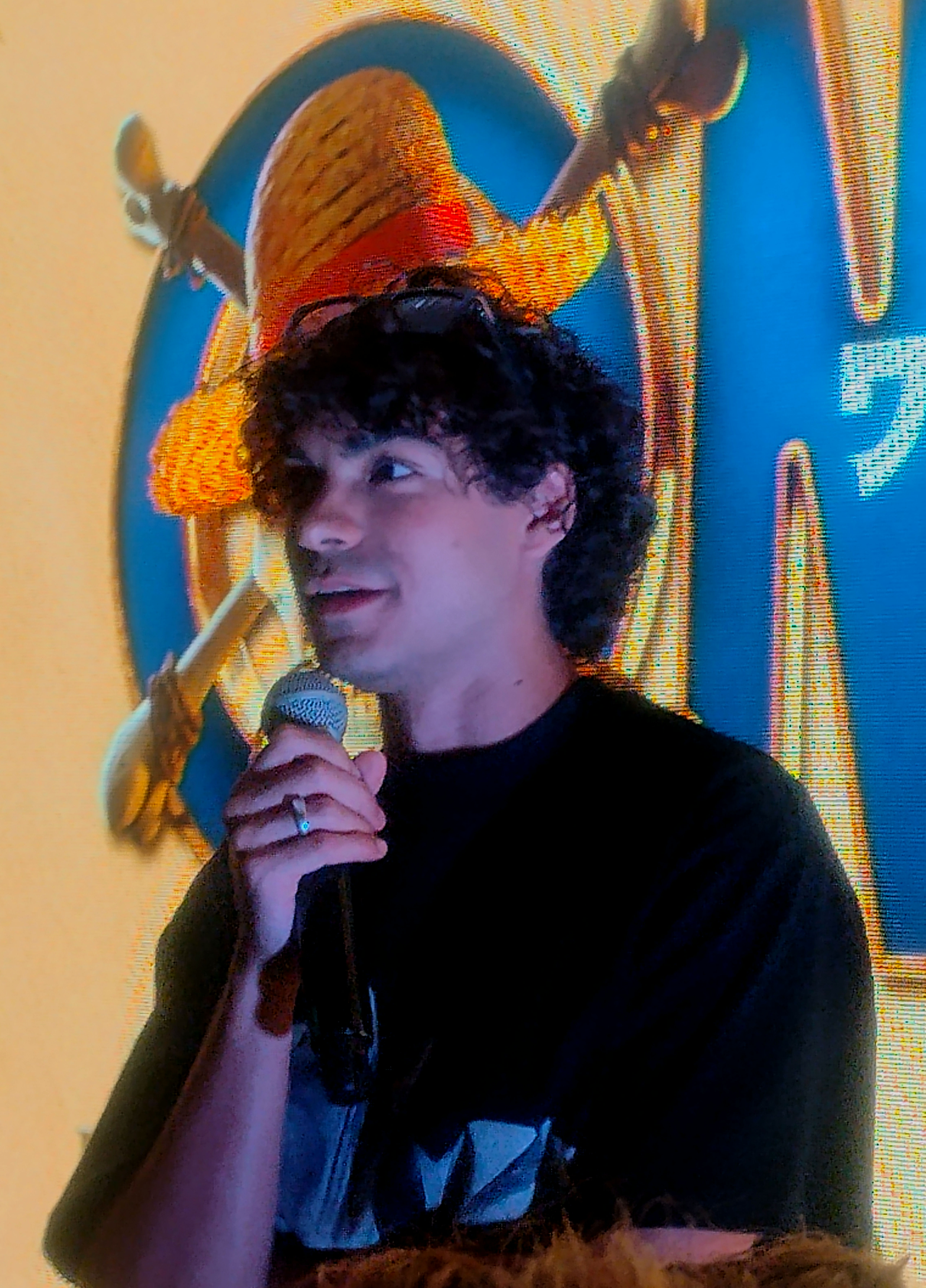
- Godoy in 2026
- Born: Iñaki Godoy Jasso; 25 August 2003 (age 23); Mexico City, Mexico
- Occupation: Actor
- Years active: 2016–present

Signature
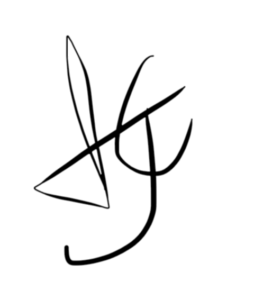

Iñaki Godoy Jasso (born 25 August 2003) is a Mexican actor who is known for his role as Juan Ruiz in The Imperfects (2022) and Monkey D. Luffy in the Netflix live-action adaptation of One Piece (2023–present).

== Career ==
In 2016, at the age of thirteen, he landed his first major role in the American Spanish-language Telemundo series La querida del Centauro, where he played Amadeo "El Gato". He continued having small and supporting roles in series such as Blue Demon (2016), Por la Máscara: La Serie Web (2018), No Fear of Truth (2019), and Los elegidos (2019), until at the age of fourteen, he reached his first leading role with his film debut in Go Youth! released in 2020. The same year, the latter was nominated for best film at the 18th edition of the Morelia International Film Festival. He was later in MexZombies, presented at the Toronto After Dark Film Festival, and No Abras La Puerta. Along with the aforementioned releases, on television he appeared in the series ¿Quién mató a Sara?, in its first two seasons, and in his first English-speaking production, The Imperfects, both produced by Netflix.

Godoy was announced as the lead role of Monkey D. Luffy in Netflix's One Piece live-action adaptation in 2021. The series premiered in 2023.

== Personal life ==
Godoy was born and raised in Mexico City. His younger sister Mia has alopecia areata, an autoimmune disease that causes hair loss, and he has publicly supported the Children's Alopecia Project: Grupo México to raise awareness for children with the condition.

Following the completion of One Piece's first season, Godoy spent 80 days sailing in the Caribbean, during which he learned to cook and navigate using compasses and constellations.

Godoy began studying Japanese in early 2024 after being cast as Luffy, stating he wanted Japanese fans to be able to speak with Luffy directly. In 2024, he conducted an on-set in Cape Town interview with series creator Eiichiro Oda in Japanese. He later appeared at One Piece Day '25 in Tokyo in August 2025, speaking to the crowd entirely in Japanese.

== Filmography ==
=== Films ===
Year	Title	Role	Notes
2020	¡Ánimo Juventud!	Pedro	
2022	MexZombies	Tavo	
2022	No abras la puerta	Fausto	

=== Television ===
Year	Title	Role	Notes
2016–2017	La querida del Centauro	Amadeo "El Gato"	
2016	Blue Demon	Child Blue Demon	Episode: "Entre el dolor y el amor"
2018	Por la Máscara: La Serie Web	Young Aurelio	
2019	No Fear of Truth	El Chinos	
2019	Los elegidos	Bruno	
2021	Who Killed Sara?	Bruno Lazcano	Recurring role
2022	The Imperfects	Juan Ruíz	Main role
2023–present	One Piece	Monkey D. Luffy	Lead role and Latin American Spanish voice-over
2026	Lego One Piece	Monkey D. Luffy	Main voice role
