= Marco de la O =

Mexican actor

Marco de la O is a Mexican actor, best known for the lead role of Joaquín "El Chapo" Guzmán in the Netflix and Univision television series El Chapo. He starred opposite Sylvester Stallone in Rambo: Last Blood in 2019. He starred in a lead role opposite Paulina Dávila and Mauricio Ochmann in the limited television series R, a joint venture between Viacom International and Spanish-language distributor Clarovideo in mid-2020. He is set to star in the second season of Falsa Identidad opposite Camila Sodi, Luis Ernesto Franco, Eduardo Yañez, and Sonya Smith in late 2020.

== Selected television ==
- Tanto amor (2015)
- Un día cualquiera (2016)
- El Chapo (2017–2018)
- Falsa Identidad (2020–2021)
- Pacto de sangre (2023)

== Selected filmography ==
- Rambo: Last Blood (2019) as Manuel
