= ¿Quién es la máscara? (Mexican TV series) season 5 =

¿Quién es la máscara?
- Season 5
- Hosted by: Omar Chaparro
- Judges: Carlos Rivera; Juanpa Zurita; Yuri; Martha Higareda
- Winner: Bárbara de Regil as "Puercoespunk"
- Runner-up: Carlos Baute as "José Ramonstruo"
- No. of episodes: 10

Release
- Original network: Las Estrellas
- Original release: October 15 – December 17, 2023

Season chronology
- ← Previous; Season 4 Next → Season 6

The fifth season of the Mexican television series ¿Quién es la máscara? premiered on Las Estrellas on October 15, 2023. On December 17, 2023, Puercoespunk (actress Bárbara de Regil) was declared the winner, and José Ramonstruo (singer Carlos Baute) the runner-up.

== Panelists and host ==
Season 5 panelists and host

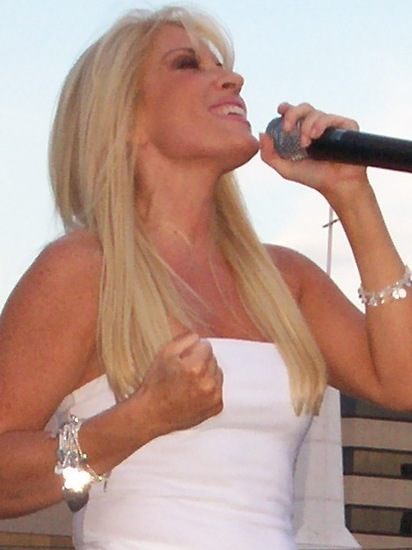
Yuri

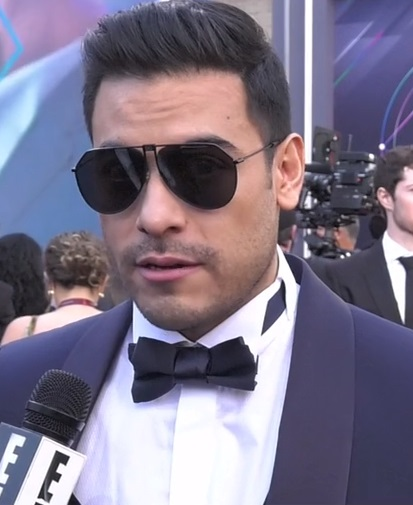
Carlos Rivera

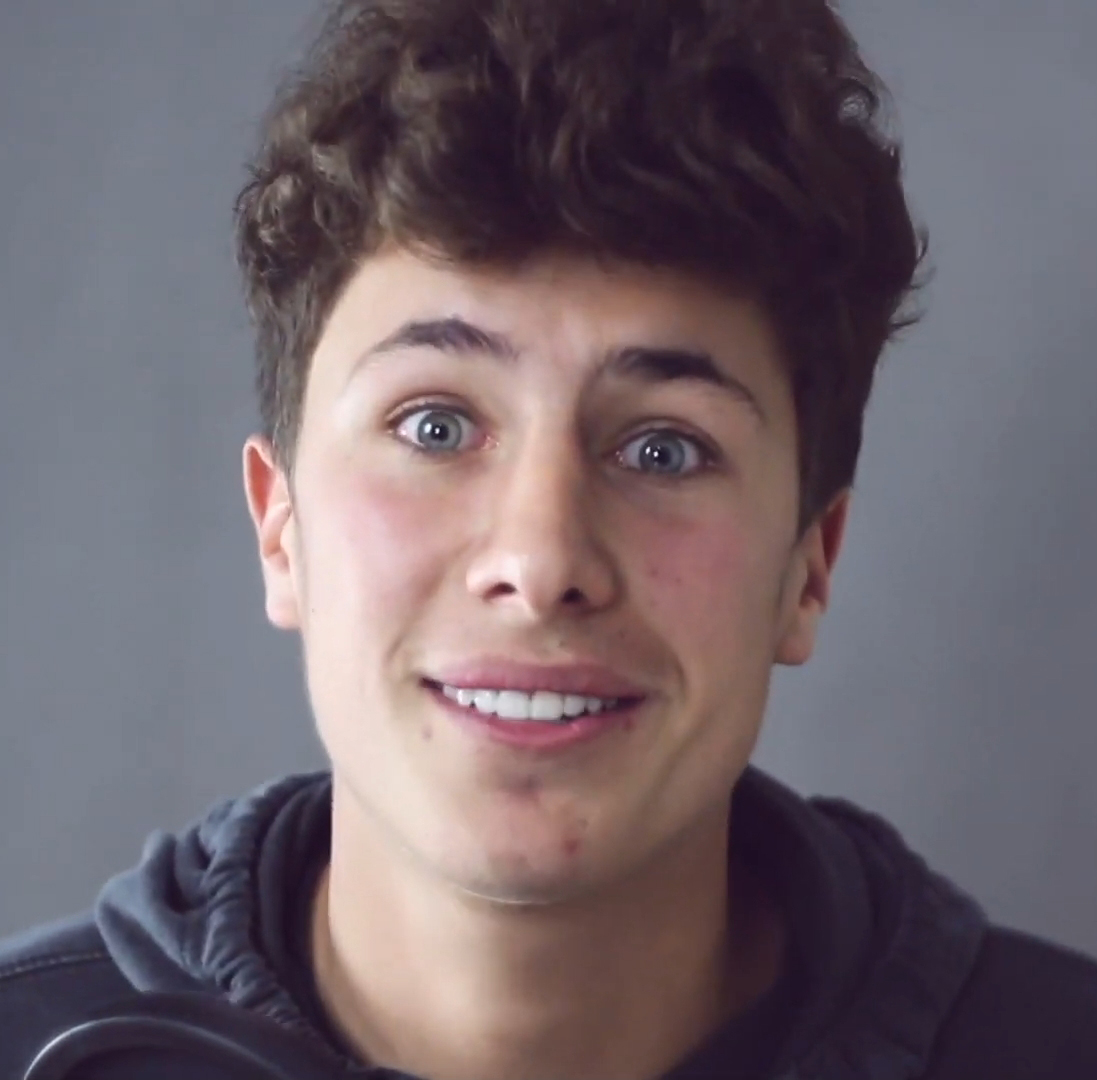
Juanpa Zurita

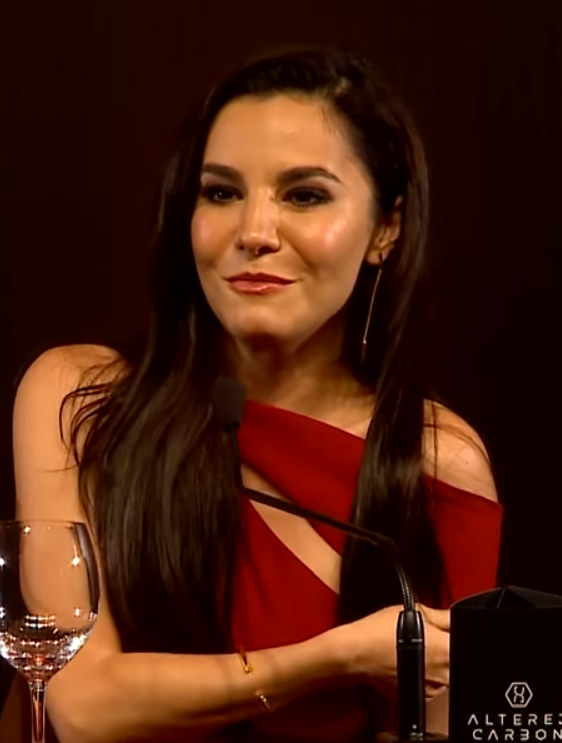
Martha Higareda

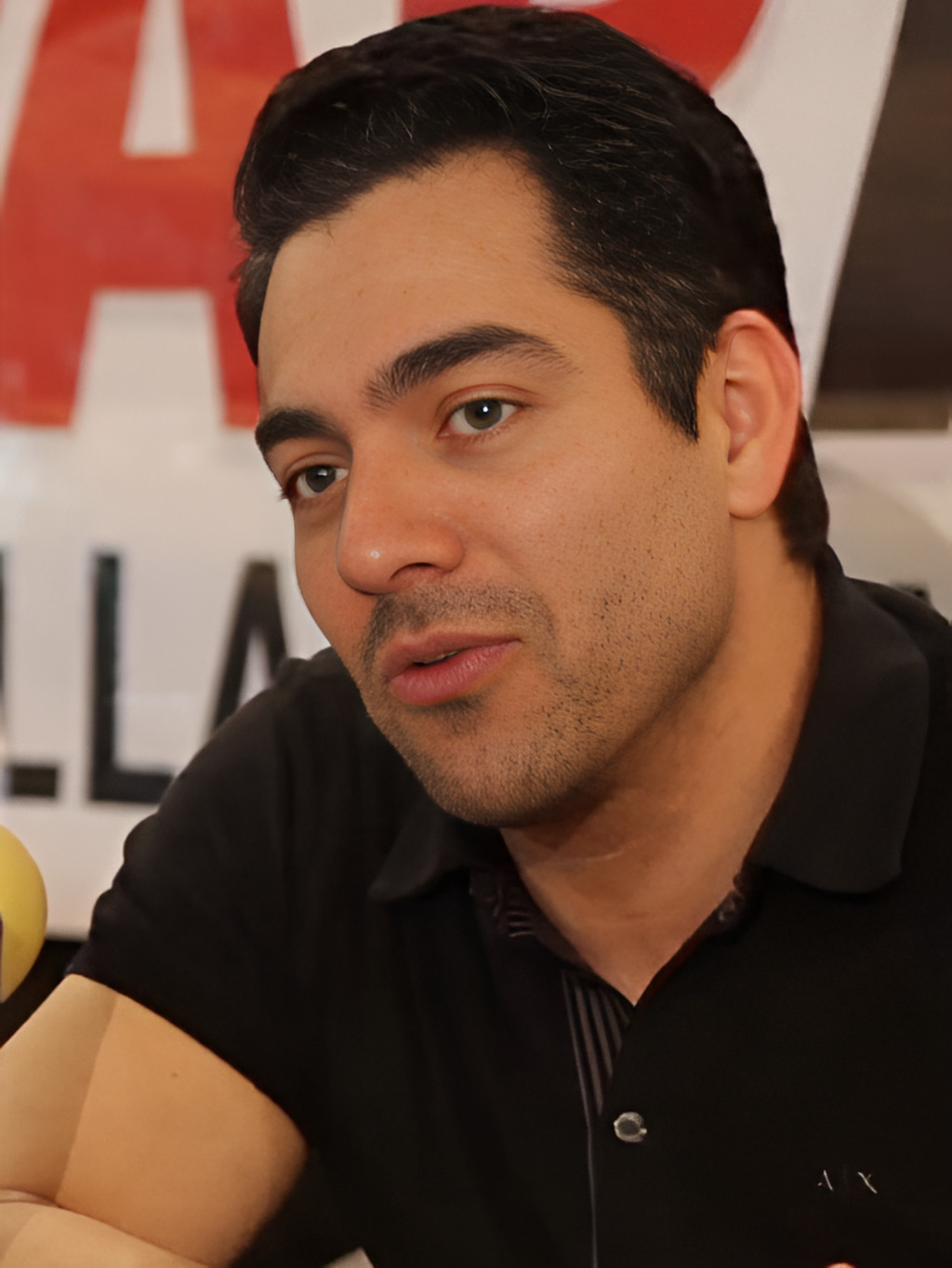
Omar Chaparro

Singer Yuri, singer Carlos Rivera, and social media influencer Juanpa Zurita returned as panelists. Galilea Montijo did not return as a panelist, being replaced by actress Martha Higareda. Omar Chaparro returned as host.

Throughout the season, various guest panelists appeared as the fifth panelist in the panel for one episode. These guest panelists included internet personality Wendy Guevara (episode 1), singers María José (episode 2), Diego Torres (episode 6), and Emmanuel (episode 8).

== Contestants ==
Results
Stage name	Celebrity	Occupation(s)	Episodes										
Stage name	Celebrity	Occupation(s)	1	2	3	4	5	6	7	8	9	10	
Stage name	Celebrity	Occupation(s)	1	2	3	4	5	6	7	8	9	A	B
Puercoespunk	Bárbara de Regil	Actress			WIN		WIN		WIN	WIN	SAFE	SAFE	WINNER
José Ramonstruo	Carlos Baute	Singer	WIN			RISK		WIN		WIN	SAFE	SAFE	RUNNER-UP
Jaguar	Werevertumorro	Internet personality		WIN		WIN		WIN		WIN	SAFE	THIRD	
Huesos	Yordi Rosado	TV personality		WIN		WIN		RISK		WIN	OUT		
Pastelito	Ivonne Montero	Actress		RISK			WIN	RISK		RISK	OUT		
Dientes	Paul Stanley	TV personality			WIN		RISK		RISK	RISK	OUT		
Llama	Alejandra Espinoza	TV personality	WIN				WIN		WIN	OUT			
Hada	Mariazel Olle Casals	TV personality	WIN			RISK			RISK	OUT			
Bombona	Kika Edgar	Actress and singer		WIN		WIN			OUT				
Carritos Chocones	Alan Ibarra	Singers		WIN			WIN		OUT				
Carritos Chocones	Hugo de la Barreda "Alex"	Singers		WIN			WIN		OUT				
Carritos Chocones	Mauri Stern	Singers		WIN			WIN		OUT				
Carritos Chocones	Tono Beltranena	Singers		WIN			WIN		OUT				
Avispa	Chantal Andere	Actress and singer		WIN		WIN		OUT					
Sardinas	Daniel Elbittar	Actor and singer	RISK				RISK	OUT					
Namasté	Ernesto D'Alessio	Actor and singer			RISK		OUT						
Pixel Boy	Nicola Porcella	TV personality			WIN		OUT						
Bebé Alien	Drake Bell	Actor and musician	WIN			OUT							
Hechicera	Lorena de la Garza	Actress			WIN	OUT							
Balero	Jorge "Coque" Muñiz	Actor and comedian			OUT								
Girasol	Cristián de la Fuente	Actor		OUT									
Milagrito	Mimí	Singer	OUT										

The masked singer won their face-off and remained in the competition.
The masked singer lost their face-off, but was not eliminated.
The masked singer was safe from elimination.
The masked singer was eliminated from the competition.
The masked singer did not perform.
The masked singer is scheduled to perform.

== Episodes ==
=== Week 1 (October 15) ===
- Panelist reveal: Wendy Guevara as Casita Embrujada

Performances on the first episode
#	Stage name	Song	Identity	Result
1	Milagrito	"No Me Acuerdo" by Thalía ft. Natti Natasha	Mimí	OUT
2	José Ramonstruo	"Oye Mi Amor" by Maná	undisclosed	WIN
3	Llama	"Mala Fama" by Danna Paola	undisclosed	WIN
4	Bebé Alien	"Será Que No Me Amas" by Luis Miguel	undisclosed	WIN
5	Hada	"Mamiii" by Becky G & Karol G	undisclosed	WIN
6	Sardinas	"Tulum" by Peso Pluma & Grupo Frontera	undisclosed	RISK

=== Week 2 (October 22) ===
Performances on the second episode
#	Stage name	Song	Identity	Result
1	Girasol	"Yo No Te Pido La Luna" by Daniela Romo	Cristián de la Fuente	OUT
2	Bombona	"Vampire" by Olivia Rodrigo	undisclosed	WIN
3	Carritos Chocones	"Gasolina" by Daddy Yankee	undisclosed	WIN
4	Avispa	"Mala Hierba" by Alejandra Guzmán	undisclosed	WIN
5	Jaguar	"Ella Baila Sola" by Eslabon Armado & Peso Pluma	undisclosed	WIN
6	Pastelito	"El Amor De Mi Vida" by Los Ángeles Azules & María Becerra	undisclosed	RISK
7	Huesos	"La Bachata" by Manuel Turizo	undisclosed	WIN

=== Week 3 (October 29) ===
Performances on the third episode
#	Stage name	Song	Identity	Result
1	Puercoespunk	"Whenever, Wherever" by Shakira	undisclosed	WIN
2	Balero	"En El Radio Un Cochinero" by Victor Cibrian	Jorge "Coque" Muñiz	OUT
3	Pixel Boy	"La Mamá De La Mamá" by El Alfa, CJ & El Cherry Scom	undisclosed	WIN
4	Namasté	"Peso Pluma: Bzrp Music Sessions, Vol. 55" by Bizarrap & Peso Pluma	undisclosed	RISK
5	Hechicera	"Envolver" by Anitta	undisclosed	WIN
6	Dientes	"Un x100to" by Grupo Frontera & Bad Bunny	undisclosed	WIN

=== Week 4 (November 5) ===
Performances on the fourth episode
#	Stage name	Song	Identity	Result
1	Hechicera	"Feel This Moment" by Pitbull ft. Christina Aguilera	Lorena de la Garza	OUT
2	Jaguar	"Hawái" by Maluma	undisclosed	WIN
3	Bombona	"Flowers" by Miley Cyrus	undisclosed	WIN
4	José Ramonstruo	"La Ingrata" by Café Tacvba	undisclosed	RISK
5	Bebé Alien	"Jailhouse Rock" by Elvis Presley	Drake Bell	OUT
6	Hada	"Chanel" by Becky G & Peso Pluma	undisclosed	RISK
7	Huesos	"Vagabundo" by Sebastián Yatra, Manuel Turizo & Beéle	undisclosed	WIN
8	Avispa	"Rolling in the Deep" by Adele	undisclosed	WIN

=== Week 5 (November 12) ===
Performances on the fifth episode
#	Stage name	Song	Identity	Result
1	Llama	"Loba" by Shakira	undisclosed	WIN
2	Pixel Boy	"Ya Lo Veía Venir" by Moderatto	Nicola Porcella	OUT
3	Sardinas	"Ya No Tiene Novio" by Sebastián Yatra & Mau y Ricky	undisclosed	RISK
4	Pastelito	"TQG" by Karol G & Shakira	undisclosed	WIN
5	Puercoespunk	"Y Así Fue" by Julión Álvarez	undisclosed	WIN
6	Carritos Chocones	"Jumpin" by Pitbull & Lil Jon	undisclosed	WIN
7	Dientes	"PRC" by Peso Pluma & Natanael Cano	undisclosed	RISK
8	Namasté	"Mi Gente" by J Balvin & Willy William	Ernesto D'Alessio	OUT

=== Week 6 (November 19) ===
- Guest performance: "Prometiste" by Pepe Aguilar performed by Diego Torres as Caballero

#	Stage name	Song	Identity	Result
1	Sardinas	"El Tiburón" by Proyecto Uno	Daniel Elbittar	OUT
2	Pastelito	"Prefiero Ser Su Amante" by María José	undisclosed	RISK
3	Jaguar	"Ya Supérame" by Grupo Firme	undisclosed	WIN
4	José Ramonstruo	"Lala" by Myke Towers	undisclosed	WIN
5	Huesos	"No Se Va" by Morat	undisclosed	RISK
6	Avispa	"Vivir Así Es Morir de Amor" by Nathy Peluso	Chantal Andere	OUT

=== Week 7 (November 26) ===
#	Stage name	Song	Identity	Result
1	Carritos Chocones	"La Bebé" by Yng Lvcas	Alan Ibarra	OUT
1	Carritos Chocones	"La Bebé" by Yng Lvcas	Hugo de la Barreda "Alex"	OUT
1	Carritos Chocones	"La Bebé" by Yng Lvcas	Mauri Stern	OUT
1	Carritos Chocones	"La Bebé" by Yng Lvcas	Tono Beltranena	OUT
2	Hada	"Sin Pijama" by Becky G & Natti Natasha	undisclosed	RISK
3	Puercoespunk	"Shakira: Bzrp Music Sessions, Vol. 53" by Bizarrap & Shakira	undisclosed	WIN
4	Bombona	"Cruel Summer" by Taylor Swift	Kika Edgar	OUT
5	Dientes	"Amateur (Rock Me Amadeus)" by Molotov	undisclosed	RISK
6	Llama	"Miénteme" by Tini ft. María Becerra	undisclosed	WIN

=== Week 8 (December 3) ===
#	Stage name	Song	Identity	Result
1	Hada	"Ni Tú Ni Nadie" by Alaska y Dinarama	Mariazel Olle Casals	OUT
2	José Ramonstruo	"La Chica de Humo" by Emmanuel	undisclosed	WIN
3	Dientes	"Devuélveme a mi chica" by Hombres G	undisclosed	RISK
4	Jaguar	"La Chica del Bikini Azul" by Luis Miguel	undisclosed	WIN
5	Llama	"La Maldita Primavera" by Yuri	Alejandra Espinoza	OUT
6	Huesos	"El Final" by Rostros Ocultos	undisclosed	WIN
7	Pastelito	"Besos de Ceniza" by Timbiriche	undisclosed	RISK
8	Puercoespunk	"Dr. Psiquiatra" by Gloria Trevi	undisclosed	WIN

=== Week 9 (December 10) ===
#	Stage name	Song	Identity	Result
1	Jaguar	"El Amor de Su Vida" by Julión Álvarez	undisclosed	SAFE
2	Dientes	"Dientes" by J Balvin, Usher, & DJ Khaled	Paul Stanley	OUT
3	José Ramonstruo	"Quevedo: Bzrp Music Sessions, Vol. 52" by Bizarrap & Quevedo	undisclosed	SAFE
4	Pastelito	"1, 2, 3" by Sofía Reyes ft. Jason Derulo & De La Ghetto	Ivonne Montero	OUT
5	Puercoespunk	"Gatita" by Bellakath	undisclosed	SAFE
6	Huesos	"Traicionera" by Sebastián Yatra	Yordi Rosado	OUT

=== Week 10 (December 17) ===
- Group performance: "Canción Bonita" by Carlos Vives & Ricky Martin

#	Stage name	Song	Identity	Result
Round One
1	José Ramonstruo	"El Merengue" by Marshmello & Manuel Turizo	undisclosed	SAFE
2	Jaguar	"Caraluna" by Bacilos	Werevertumorro	THIRD
3	Puercoespunk	"El Jefe" by Shakira & Fuerza Regida	undisclosed	SAFE
Round Two
4	Puercoespunk	"Supongo Que Lo Sabes" by Ha*Ash	Bárbara de Regil	WINNER
5	José Ramonstruo	"El Pobre" by Natalia Jiménez	Carlos Baute	RUNNER-UP

== Ratings ==
Show	Episode	Air date	Timeslot (CT)	Viewers (millions)
1	"Wendy, perdida o investigadora"	October 15, 2023	Sunday; 8:30 p.m.	2.9
2	"Espectáculos que dan de qué hablar"	October 22, 2023	Sunday; 8:30 p.m.	3.2
3	"Los últimos seis"	October 29, 2023	Sunday; 8:30 p.m.	2.8
4	"Las sorpresas no paran"	November 5, 2023	Sunday; 8:30 p.m.	2.6
5	"Dos personajes fuera"	November 12, 2023	Sunday; 8:30 p.m.	3.0
6	"Uno más y dos menos"	November 19, 2023	Sunday; 8:30 p.m.	2.5
7	"Pronósticos arriesgados"	November 26, 2023	Sunday; 8:30 p.m.	2.6
8	"El gran enigma"	December 3, 2023	Sunday; 8:30 p.m.	2.7
9	"La sorprendente semifinal"	December 10, 2023	Sunday; 8:30 p.m.	2.6
10	"La gran final"	December 17, 2023	Sunday; 8:00 p.m.	2.2
