= Pacto de sangre (Mexican TV series) =

- Genre: Crime drama
- Based on: Pacto de sangre by Pablo Ávila & Felipe Montero
- Showrunner: Bernardo de la Rosa
- Written by: Hubert Barrero Fonseca; Víctor Huizar; Jhonathan Urbina; Enrique Rentería
- Directed by: Bernardo de la Rosa; Sergio Osorio; Moisés Ortíz Urquidi
- Starring: Alejandro Nones; Bárbara de Regil; Luis Ernesto Franco; Marco de la O; Erika de la Rosa; Juana Arias; Tania Lizardo; Flavio Medina
- Country of origin: Mexico
- Original language: Spanish
- No. of seasons: 2
- No. of episodes: 20

Production
- Executive producers: Ricardo Coeto; Francisco Cordero
- Camera setup: Multi-camera
- Production company: BTF Media

Original release
- Network: Vix
- Release: 10 November 2023 – 14 November 2025

Pacto de sangre is a Mexican streaming television series produced by BTF Media for TelevisaUnivision. It is based on the 2018 Chilean telenovela of the same name, created by Pablo Ávila and Felipe Montero. It stars Alejandro Nones, Bárbara de Regil, Luis Ernesto Franco, Marco de la O and Flavio Medina. The series premiered on Vix on 10 November 2023. The second season premiered on 14 November 2025.

== Plot ==
A group of friends attend a bachelor party; however, the party gets out of control and a stripper dies under suspicious circumstances. The friends hide the body of the woman who apparently drowned and from then on, their lives change forever, leaving them feeling guilty and fearful of losing the life they built.

== Cast ==
=== Main ===
- Alejandro Nones as Benjamín
- Bárbara de Regil as Tamara
- Luis Ernesto Franco as Marco
- Marco de la O as Gabriel
- Erika de la Rosa as Miranda
- Juana Arias as Ana
- Tania Lizardo as Julieta
- Flavio Medina as Rubén

=== Recurring and guest stars ===
- Aldo Gallardo as Fernando
- Aldo Escalante as Alonso
- Regina Nava as Sofía
- José Peralta as Ignacio
- Giovanna Utrilla as Daniela Solís
- Mayra Rojas as Carmen Solís
- Shaula Vega as Director
- Thanya Lopez as Melanie
- Juan Carlos Martin del Campo
- Carlos Hendrick as Leo

== Production ==
In January 2023, it was reported that filming for the series had begun. The series was officially announced by TelevisaUnivision on 30 March 2023, with the cast being revealed on the same day. A trailer of the series was released on 19 October 2023. The series premiered on 10 November 2023. The second season premiered on 14 November 2025.

== Episodes ==
| Season | Episodes | Originally released | |
| Season | Episodes | First released | Last released |
|---|---|---|---|
| 1 | 10 | 10 November 2023 | 8 December 2023 |
| 2 | 10 | 14 November 2025 | |

| No. overall | No. in season | Title | Original release date |
|---|---|---|---|
| 1 | 1 | "Paraíso perdido" | 10 November 2023 |
| 2 | 2 | "La piezas se mueven" | 10 November 2023 |
| 3 | 3 | "Mentiras y confesiones" | 10 November 2023 |
| 4 | 4 | "El precio de la verdad" | 17 November 2023 |
| 5 | 5 | "Amores quebrados" | 17 November 2023 |
| 6 | 6 | "La grieta se profundiza" | 24 November 2023 |
| 7 | 7 | "Tormenta en el horizonte" | 24 November 2023 |
| 8 | 8 | "Desintegración" | 1 December 2023 |
| 9 | 9 | "Tumbas vacías" | 1 December 2023 |
| 10 | 10 | "Mirando el abismo" | 8 December 2023 |

=== Season 2 (2025) ===
| No. overall | No. in season | Title | Original release date |
|---|---|---|---|
| 11 | 1 | "Los muertos no callan" | 14 November 2025 |
| 12 | 2 | "Lluvia de cenizas" | 14 November 2025 |
| 13 | 3 | "Lazos rotos" | 14 November 2025 |
| 14 | 4 | "El peso de las horas" | 14 November 2025 |
| 15 | 5 | "El ojo del asesino" | 14 November 2025 |
| 16 | 6 | "Corazones en guerra" | 14 November 2025 |
| 17 | 7 | "Cicatrices del pasado" | 14 November 2025 |
| 18 | 8 | "Ecos de furia" | 14 November 2025 |
| 19 | 9 | "La sombra del cazador" | 14 November 2025 |
| 20 | 10 | "La herida sigue abierta" | 14 November 2025 |

== Awards and nominations ==
| Year | Award | Category | Nominated | Result | Ref |
|---|---|---|---|---|---|
| 2024 | India Catalina Awards | Best Ibero-American Talent | Bárbara de Regil | Nominated | |
