= El Chapo (TV series) =

American crime television series

- Genre: Crime thriller; Biographical
- Written by: Silvana Aguirre; Carlos Contreras
- Directed by: Ernesto Contreras; José Manuel Cravioto
- Starring: Marco de la O; Humberto Busto; Alejandro Aguilar; Rodrigo Abed; Luis Fernando Peña; Juan Carlos Olivas; Rolf Petersen; Carlos Hernán Romo; Marcela Mar
- Theme music composer: Andrés Botero
- Country of origin: United States
- Original language: Spanish (Note: With some dialogue in English)
- No. of seasons: 3
- No. of episodes: 35

Production
- Executive producers: Isaac Lee; Camila Jimenez Villa; Christian Gabela; Andrés Calderón
- Producer: Daniel Posada
- Production location: Colombia
- Cinematography: Iván Hernández; Juan Pablo Ramírez; César Gutiérrez; Tonatiuh Martinez Valdez
- Editors: Jonás García Fregoso; Jorge Macaya; Mario Monroy Nieblas; Luis Zerón
- Camera setup: Multi-camera
- Production company: Story House Entertainment

Original release
- Network: Univision
- Release: April 23, 2017 – July 25, 2018

El Chapo is an American biographical crime thriller television series, co-produced by Netflix and Univision, about the life of Joaquín "El Chapo" Guzmán. The series premiered on April 23, 2017 on Univision before airing on Netflix worldwide. It stars Marco de la O as the title character.

The series recounts the beginnings of Joaquín "El Chapo" Guzmán in 1985, when he was a low-level member of the Guadalajara Cartel, his rise to power as head of the Sinaloa Cartel, and his downfall.

On May 12, 2017, Univision confirmed that the series would be renewed for a second season. Season 2 premiered on September 17, 2017.

Netflix released the first season, comprising nine episodes, on June 16, 2017. The second season was released on December 15, 2017.

The third season premiered on July 9, 2018 on Univision, and on July 27, 2018 on Netflix.

== Cast ==
=== Main cast ===
- Marco de la O as Joaquín "El Chapo" Guzmán
- Humberto Busto as Conrado Higuera Sol "Don Sol" (a fictionalized portrayal of Genaro García Luna)
- Alejandro Aguilar as Toño Antonio Mendoza Cruz (alias El primo Tony)
- Rodrigo Abed as Amado Carrillo Fuentes (alias "El Señor de los Cielos")
- Luis Fernando Peña as Armando "Rayo" López
- Juan Carlos Olivas as Héctor Luis Palma Salazar (alias "El Güero")
- Antonio de la Vega as Arturo Bernal Leyda (a fictionalized portrayal of Arturo Beltrán Leyva)
- Rolf Petersen as Ramón Avendaño (a fictionalized portrayal of Ramón Arellano Félix)
- Carlos Hernán Romo as Benjamín Avendaño (a fictionalized portrayal of Benjamín Arellano Félix)
- Héctor Holten as President Carlos Salinas de Gortari
- Diego Vásquez as Ismael Zambrano (a fictionalized portrayal of Ismael Zambada García (alias "El Mayo")
- Paul Choza as Chente (a fictionalized portrayal of Vicente Carrillo Fuentes (alias "El Viceroy”)
- Luis Rábago as General Roberto Blanco Macías
- Dolores Heredia as Gabriela Saavedra

=== Recurring cast ===
- Ricardo Lorenzana as Miguel Ángel Félix Gallardo (alias "El Padrino")
- Mauricio Mejía as Pablo Escobar
- Biassini Segura as "El Lobito" Avendaño (a fictionalized portrayal of Francisco Javier Arellano Félix, alias “El Tigrillo”)
- Valentina Acosta as Alejandra (Alejandrina María Salazar Hernández)
- Juliette Pardau as Graciela (Griselda López Pérez)
- Laura Osma as Elba Coronado (a fictionalized portrayal of Emma Coronel Aispuro)
- Abril Schreiber as Guadalupe
- Hugo Gómez as Attorney Federico Livas
- Joseph Fusezzy as Charles Pilliod (U.S. Ambassador)
- David Ojalvo as DEA Administrator John C. Lawn
- Ermis Cruz as Isidoro (a fictionalized portrayal of Fausto Isidro Meza Flores)
- Iván Aragón as Quino Guzmán (a fictionalized portrayal of Ivan Archivaldo Guzmán, alias “El Chapito”)
- Wilmer Cadavid as Dámaso Jiménez Gálvez (a fictionalized portrayal of Damaso López Núñez, alias “El Licenciado”)
- Carlos Sanchez as Mayel (a fictionalized portrayal of Vicente Zambada Niebla alias “El Vicentillo”)
- Camilo Amores as Arturo Guzmán Loera (alias "El Pollo")
- Irán Castillo as Vanessa Espinoza Martínez (a fictionalized portrayal of Kate del Castillo)
- Marcela Mar as Berta Ávila (a fictionalized portrayal of Claudia Ruiz Massieu)
- Juan Pablo de Santiago as Sebastián "Franco" López Nayal
- Teté Espinoza as Chío

== Episodes ==
=== Series overview ===
Season	Episodes	Originally released	
Season	Episodes	First released	Last released
1	10	April 23, 2017	May 21, 2017
2	12	September 17, 2017	December 3, 2017
3	13	July 9, 2018	July 25, 2018

=== Season 1 (2017) ===
No. overall	No. in season	Title	Original release date	Prod. code	US viewers (millions)
1	1	"Chapter 1"	23 April 2017	101	1.73
2	2	"Chapter 2"	23 April 2017	102	1.73
Joaquín "El Chapo" Guzmán is a man who seeks to make his way in the illegal world of drug trafficking, for this he makes himself known to his other colleagues as El Chapo and seeks to change the rules of the business at all costs. To start with everything he knows he needs to risk dying and he looks for the Colombian capo named Pablo Escobar and offers to pass him a ton of merchandise in only 48 hours but if he does not make it he will be a dead man. Joaquín is a lover of the tunnels and knows how to cross the drug through the border with Mexico without any danger of being discovered and this will be his key to escalate the drug trafficking business. When everything seems to go perfectly El Chapo receives the news of the death of his father for an illness and even though their relationship was not the best he wanted to say goodbye but time did not work in his favor.
3	3	"Chapter 3"	30 April 2017	103	1.60
4	4	"Chapter 4"	30 April 2017	104	1.60
5	5	"Chapter 5"	7 May 2017	105	1.58
6	6	"Chapter 6"	7 May 2017	106	1.58
Sol tries to find incriminating information on General Blanco. He was involved in a mass rape decades ago. Sol gives this information to Gabriela, a journalist who investigated the rapes. Afterwards Sol gets promoted and takes over Blanco's position.
7	7	"Chapter 7"	14 May 2017	107	1.37
8	8	"Chapter 8"	14 May 2017	108	1.37
9	9	"Chapter 9"	21 May 2017	109	1.54
10	10	"Chapter 10"	21 May 2017	110	1.54
Attempts to leave the Almoloya prison are unsuccessful. Guzman remains in solitary confinement. In a flashback we see the young Joaquin getting acquainted with local drug cartels.

=== Season 2 (2017) ===
No. overall	No. in season	Title	Original release date	Prod. code	US viewers (millions)
11	1	"Chapter 1"	17 September 2017	201	1.45
El Chapo manages to escape the prison of Puente Grande where he was transferred after Sol's intervention.
12	2	"Chapter 2"	24 September 2017	202	1.18
13	3	"Chapter 3"	1 October 2017	203	1.19
14	4	"Chapter 4"	8 October 2017	204	N/A
El Chapo announces that he's taking over the federation and immediately sets out to neutralize Raciel and Tony Tormenta.
15	5	"Chapter 5"	15 October 2017	205	N/A
El Pollo, Joaquin's brother, is shot in Puente Grande.
16	6	"Chapter 6"	22 October 2017	206	N/A
The presidential elections are near and Alarcón (Felipe Calderón) lags behind leftist candidate Labrador (Andrés Manuel López Obrador). Sol tries to implicate one of Labrador's close associates, "El Profesor", with the aid of businessman Carlos Almada. When his plotting ends up favoring Labrador, Sol resorts to
17	7	"Chapter 7"	29 October 2017	207	N/A
When Alarcón assumes his presidency he announces a full scale war on the drug cartels, backed with US supplied weapons. Sol informs Guzman that the government and his federation need to work together as one, first against Cano and the Emes. Guzman also takes an interest in the 17 year old Elva Coronado who wins a beauty pageant (with his backing).
18	8	"Chapter 8"	5 November 2017	208	1.35
The drug war between the Sinaloa and Gulf cartel leads to abductions and massacres of civilians. The government is pressured to intervene by distraught families, but they are left to their own devices. One mother goes to Culiacan to search for her missing daughter, Marta. In another story, boys are forcibly recruited and trained to be child soldiers for the Emes. Another family is shown working on a Juarez cartel poppy field; they try to escape from their desperate situation after the field is seized by the Sinaloa cartel.
19	9	"Chapter 9"	12 November 2017	209	1.13
Guzman decides to betray the Gulf cartel and have the Bernal Leyda brothers taken out. Arturo remains free and has an alliance with the Emes and Chente. Moreno arrives in Chicago but decides to go back home after being turned down at a club . Sol and Sebastian go out together in a restaurant. Sol does not feel at ease.
20	10	"Chapter 10"	19 November 2017	210	1.15
Guzman imposes a curfew on Culiacan. Moreno arrives in the evening and wonders why the streets are empty. Gang members of the Sinaloa cartel mistake him for Arturo and gun him down.
21	11	"Chapter 11"	3 December 2017	211	1.30
22	12	"Chapter 12"	3 December 2017	212	1.30
Joaquin is grieving his son's passing. Arturo decides to take advantage of the situation and attack the Sinaloa cartel. Sol and Ismael are worried about Joaquin's absence. Meanwhile, the violence on the streets continues unabated. After Moreno's funeral, Joaquin meets Sol and asks for the help of the DEA. Raciel is in American custody and asks his brother Tony Tormenta to help out Joaquin. A full scale assault on Ciudad Juarez is launched to threaten Chente and Arturo. This includes the abduction of the mayor of Juarez to threaten him into submission. Tony Tormenta cooperates but in a shootout Cano manages to kill him. The military kills Arturo, the police arrests and imprisons Chente. Toño is made leader of Guadalajara. Sol is offered the job of Minister of Interior Affairs but he has to leave Sebastian.

=== Season 3 (2018) ===
No. overall	No. in season	Title	Original release date	Prod. code	US viewers (millions)
23	1	"Chapter 1"	9 July 2018	301	1.09
El Chapo and his men find the perfect place to build the world's largest drug lab. Don Sol gives Franco money and demands that he stay away from him, but he rejects it. DEA analysis shows that the Sinaloa cartel has rapidly expanded operations in the entire world. Prieto (Enrique Peña Nieto) of the PTI is the likely presidential candidate. Joaquin disregards the orders of the DEA, in retaliation they pressure Lora to do their bidding.
24	2	"Chapter 2"	10 July 2018	302	0.99
Don Sol agrees to marry Berta to fulfill his political goals. Men of El Chapo confess to the US police that he was about to put a bomb in the embassy. Mayel is arrested, Joaquin stops the Malaysia operations in exchange for his release.
25	3	"Chapter 3"	11 July 2018	303	1.00
El Chapo sends Elba to live in another house so no one will hurt her. Don Sol and El Chapo make an agreement to make the police believe that he is trying to catch him and that both can fulfill their plans. A journalist of El Popular investigates allegations that Don Sol is protecting El Chapo.
26	4	"Chapter 4"	12 July 2018	304	1.03
Isidoro leaves a message for El Chapo demanding him to defend his place, since he is determined to be his worst enemy. Elba tells El Chapo that she is expecting twins.
27	5	"Chapter 5"	13 July 2018	305	0.90
El Chapo asks his men to do social work on behalf of Esteban Prieto so that people vote for him. Esteban wins the elections and Don Sol is appointed Secretary of Governance.
28	6	"Chapter 6"	16 July 2018	306	0.89
El Chapo and his men steal Isidoro's merchandise and destroy his laboratory. The army tries to catch El Chapo, but he manages to escape and Don Sol gets upset because he knows that it will be more complicated now to arrest him.
29	7	"Chapter 7"	17 July 2018	307	0.98
El Chapo is arrested by the army and Don Sol informs Esteban that the world will find out that they caught the most important drug trafficker in the world. Don Sol meets Franco and his wife discovers him.
30	8	"Chapter 8"	18 July 2018	308	0.88
El Chapo begins to get contacts in jail to avoid being extradited and escape. Esteban asks his wife to publicly clarify the problem he has with one of his properties and Don Sol is enraged when he realizes it.
31	9	"Chapter 9"	19 July 2018	309	0.99
Two versions of how Damaso and Quino fight to take over the cartel. El Chapo learns about the problems between Damaso and Quino and demands that they respect each other, but he knows that he must rush to escape from prison or they could ruin the organization.
32	10	"Chapter 10"	20 July 2018	310	1.00
The men of El Chapo begin to dig the tunnel so he can escape. El Chapo manages to escape with the help of his men and the contacts of Don Sol.
33	11	"Chapter 11"	23 July 2018	311	1.07
El Chapo makes clear the distribution of his power if he could not take over the organization. Franco tells Don Sol that he will go to work in another state because he is tired of having to hide so nobody knows about their relationship.
34	12	"Chapter 12"	24 July 2018	312	0.97
Don Sol tells El Chapo that they must get a man to pose as him so that he can remain free. El Chapo asks an actress to make a film about him so that people always remember him.
35	13	"Chapter 13"	25 July 2018	313	1.07
Esteban demands from Don Sol that he resign, he refuses and threatens to confess that Chapo paid for his campaign and that he helped him escape from prison. Don Sol suspects that El Chapo will hide with Marcelo and sends the army to look for him. While Gortari wants to appoint his daughter as presidential candidate but eventually Don Sol earns his trust and is himself appointed.
