= Bárbara de Regil =

Mexican actress (born 1987)

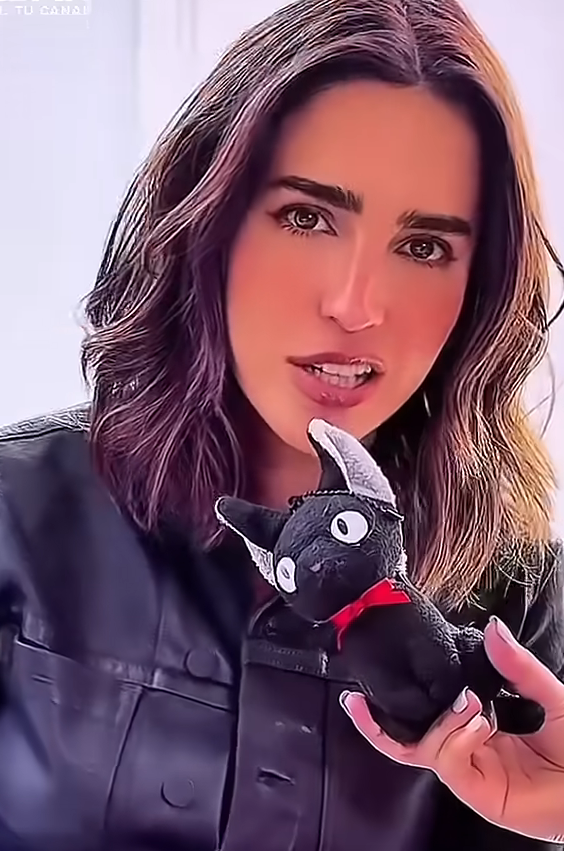
- De Regil in 2026
- Born: Claudia Bárbara de Regil Alfaro; June 5, 1987 (age 39); Mexico City, Mexico
- Occupation: Actress
- Years active: 2011–present
- Notable work: Rosario Tijeras
- Spouse: Fernando Schoenwald (m. 2017)
- Children: 1
- Family: Bárbara Alfaro (mother); Mika De Regil (sister); Marco Antonio Regil (cousin)

Claudia Bárbara de Regil Alfaro (born in Mexico City, Mexico) is a Mexican actress.

== Career ==
De Regil debuted on television in the telenovela Bajo el alma. Her most famous role is portraying the title role in Rosario Tijeras (2016–2019), the Mexican adaptation of the Colombian action-thriller series of the same name, from Sony Pictures Television and TV Azteca. On November 5, 2020, it was reported that she had joined the cast of the crime action film Blackout opposite Josh Duhamel, Abbie Cornish, Nick Nolte and Omar Chaparro. In April 2021, De Regil was cast in the lead role of the romcom television series Parientes a la fuerza on Telemundo, the Spanish-language network subsidiary of NBC Universal.

== Personal life ==
De Regil was born in Mexico and is of Lebanese descent. She is the cousin of Mexican broadcaster and presenter Marco Antonio Regil. She had a daughter at age 16. In 2017, she married attorney and real estate developer Fernando Schoenwald.

== Filmography ==
=== Film ===
Year	Title	Roles	Notes
2014	Happy Times	Andrea Villalobos	
2018	Consciencia	Mónica	
2018	Ni tú ni yo	Miranda	
2018	Loca por el trabajo	Alicia	
2020	Mutiny of the Worker Bees	Tonia Davich	
2022	MexZombies	Chief Vargas	
2023	Quiero tu vida	Sofi del Mar	
2024	El roomie	Lucía	
2025	Vasily	Bonita	

=== Television ===
Year	Title	Roles	Notes
2011	Bajo el alma	Giovanna Negrete	
2012	Amor cautivo	Vanessa Ledesma	
2013	Secretos de familia	Sofía Ventura Álvarez	
2015	Así en el barrio como en el cielo	Lucía Fernanda	
2015	El Torito	Ana	Main role; 15 episodes
2016–2019; 2025	Rosario Tijeras	Rosario Tijeras	Main role; 237 episodes
2021–2022	Parientes a la fuerza	Carmen Jurado	Main role; 100 episodes
2022	40 y 20	Mariana	Episode: "Bienvenido Fran"
2022–2023	Cabo	Sofía Chávez	Main role; 85 episodes
2023	Pacto de sangre	Tamara	Main role
2023	¿Quién es la máscara?	Puercoespunk	Season 5 winner
2024	Lalola	Lola	Main role
2025	Mujeres asesinas	Raquel	Episode: "Raquel"
