= Papás por siempre =

2025 Mexican television series

- Season 2
- Starring: Ariadne Díaz; José Ron; Altair Jarabo; Juan Diego Covarrubias; Erika Buenfil
- No. of episodes: 82

Release
- Original network: Las Estrellas
- Original release: 13 October 2025 – 1 February 2026

Season chronology
- ← Previous; Papás por conveniencia

The second and final season of the Mexican telenovela Papás por conveniencia, titled Papás por siempre, was announced on 4 February 2025. The season is directed by Benjamín Cann and Fernando Nesme. The season premiered on 13 October 2025.

Ariadne Díaz, José Ron, Daniela Luján, Martín Ricca, Miguel Martínez returned to the main cast, with Erika Buenfil, Altair Jarabo and Juan Diego Covarrubias as newcomers.

== Plot ==
Five years have passed since the events of the previous season, and the Guevara-Mosqueda household has grown with the arrival of Alexander, Aidé and Tino's youngest son. However, Lila no longer lives with them, and her absence is a subject that no one dares to mention. Tino and Aidé sold Maxiclick to focus on MaxiMax, a digital content and music production company where many of their friends work. Aidé serves as president of the company, while Tino is the artistic director. Rudolf works as an A&R representative, and Clara Luz is the label manager. Despite this joint effort, the Guevara-Mosquedas face multiple financial challenges. Chano, on the other hand, is the only one in the group who did not join the company, as he decided to open his own gym in the neighborhood. Meanwhile, Lichita, who always fought to achieve her goals, accomplished her dreams before her death, leaving a void in the group.

At a family gathering, Bertha, Tino's mother, suffers a fatal heart attack. At her funeral, Hernán, Tino's absent father, comes back wanting to make amends, but Tino rejects him. Hernán discovered the existence of Iker, a 13-year-old boy who is Tino's son. Tino remembers that after he broke up with Paulina, he had a one-night stand with Melina. What nobody knows is that Iker is really Hernán's son. Hernán and Melina planned to get close to Tino to take advantage of him. However, Hernán didn't expect Melina to fall in love with Tino, complicating the plan and raising questions about her loyalty.

Gisela, Aidé's mother, also arrives in search of support after the death of her third husband. The relationship between the two has never been particularly close and Gisela's presence triggers old resentments, as Aidé cannot help but reproach her for only returning because she is alone. Tino tries to intercede for Gisela, but Aidé reminds him that he himself has refused to give his own father a chance. The Guevara-Mosqueda family begins to live under the same roof with Hernán, Melina, Iker, and Gisela, creating a tense and chaotic atmosphere that tests the relationship between Aidé and Tino.

A successful businessman named Bill appears, revealing that he is Emiliano's biological father and that he was unaware of his existence. Bill takes a romantic interest in Aidé, causing conflict and jealousy in Tino. Paulina reappears, claiming to be remorseful and wanting to reconnect with her children Lila and Emiliano, but her sudden reappearance sows doubts among everyone. Lila's return reveals a secret that brings back a painful event from Tino and Aidé's past, something they tried to forget. This secret is the result of a mistake from years ago that now risks breaking the family apart for good, putting the Guevara-Mosqueda family on the verge of a permanent separation.

== Cast ==
=== Main ===
- Ariadne Díaz as Aidé Mosqueda
- José Ron as Tino Guevara
- Altair Jarabo as Melina
- Juan Diego Covarrubias as Bill
- Erika Buenfil as Gisela
- Daniela Luján as Clara Luz Monroy
- Martín Ricca as Rudolf Torre
- Miguel Martínez as Chano Chamorro
- José Elías Moreno as Hernán
- Pablo Valentín as Nazario
- Michelle González as Serena
- Adriana Llabrés as Paulina Dorado Garzón
- Tania Lizardo as Prisma
- María Perroni as Sofía "Chofis" Chamorro Chagoyan
- Joaquín Bondoni as Sergio "Checo" Chamorro Chagoyan
- Francisco Rubio as El Chacal
- Jorge Bolaños as Aurelio
- Victoria Viera as Circe Mosqueda
- Emilio Beltrán as Ulises Mosqueda
- Alejandra Zaid as Lila Guevara Dorado
- Sebastián Poza as Valerio
- Checo Perezcuadra as Poncho
- Diego Escalona as Iker
- Íker García Meza as Emiliano Guevara Dorado
- Cristela Loesca as Scarlet Topete Mosqueda
- André Sebastián as Jesús "Chuchito" Chamorro Chagoyan
- Gabriel Rolón as Pipe
- Luciana Loera as Natalia
- Santi Reynes as Alexander
- Natalia Álvarez as Yeni
- Simone Mateos as Lorena
- Ethan Mebarek as Tilico
- Christopher Aguilasocho as Armando Valladares
- José Remis as Igor

=== Guest stars ===
- Leticia Perdigón as Bertha
- Sherlyn as Silvana
- Wendy Guevara as herself
- María Chacón as Alicia "Lichita" Chagoyan

== Production ==
=== Development ===
On 4 February 2025, Rosy Ocampo announced that Papás por conveniencia was renewed for a second season and would be set five years after the events of the first season. On 19 March 2025, Ocampo announced Papás por siempre as the title of the season and confirmed it would be the final season. Filming of the season took place from 7 May 2025 to 26 September 2025.

=== Casting ===
On 4 February 2025, Ariadne Díaz and José Ron were confirmed to reprise their roles. On 10 April 2025, it was announced that Erika Buenfil had been cast as Aidé's mother, Gisela. On 28 April 2025, it was announced that Adriana Fonseca would not be returning as Paulina and Adriana Llabrés was cast to replace her. The roles of the children's cast were recast in order to reflect their new ages following the time jump. Alejandra Zaid replaced Tania Nicole as Lila, while Íker García Meza replaced Juan Pablo Velasco as Emiliano. Also joining the cast was Altair Jarabo as Melina, José Elías Moreno, Juan Diego Covarrubias as Bill, Pablo Valentín as Nazario, Tania Lizardo as Prisma and Michelle González as Serena.

== Episodes ==
No. overall	No. in season	Title	Original release date	Mexico viewers (millions)
81	1	"¡Mamá, no te mueras!"	13 October 2025	4.81
82	2	"Te presento a tu hijo"	14 October 2025	5.00
83	3	"Soy su padre"	15 October 2025	4.56
84	4	"La extraño mucho"	16 October 2025	5.04
85	5	"¿Qué está pasando?"	17 October 2025	3.78
86	6	"Los secretos no duran para siempre"	20 October 2025	4.28
87	7	"¿Eres mi papá?"	21 October 2025	4.08
88	8	"No eres mi papá"	22 October 2025	5.05
89	9	"Es nuestra hija"	23 October 2025	4.34
90	10	"Yo di a luz a Natalia"	24 October 2025	3.89
91	11	"Emiliano es mi hijo"	27 October 2025	4.73
92	12	"¿Quieres que me quiten a Emiliano?"	28 October 2025	4.14
93	13	"Puedes acercarte a Emiliano"	29 October 2025	4.18
94	14	"¿Por qué lo hiciste mamá?"	30 October 2025	4.19
95	15	"¿Por qué se fue Lila?"	31 October 2025	4.23
96	16	"Tienes otro hermano"	3 November 2025	4.43
97	17	"Yo soy tu hermana"	4 November 2025	4.01
98	18	"Acepto que mi hija Circe se case"	5 November 2025	4.74
99	19	"Tu lugar está con tu marido"	6 November 2025	5.00
100	20	"No gastaré balas"	7 November 2025	4.56
101	21	"¿Te quieres quedar con Tino?"	10 November 2025	4.59
102	22	"Vine por el perdón de mis hijos"	11 November 2025	4.22
103	23	"¿Es mi padre biológico?"	12 November 2025	4.72
104	24	"¿Se van a divorciar?"	13 November 2025	4.18
105	25	"¿Me quieres quitar a mi esposa?"	14 November 2025	3.81
106	26	"Me fascinaste"	17 November 2025	4.07
107	27	"Podría herir a quien más quieres"	18 November 2025	3.90
108	28	"Los responsables son ustedes"	19 November 2025	4.32
109	29	"Yo soy"	20 November 2025	3.91
110	30	"No estoy desaparecida"	21 November 2025	3.73
111	31	"El divorcio"	24 November 2025	3.97
112	32	"No se van a ir de aquí"	25 November 2025	4.31
113	33	"No me restes autoridad"	26 November 2025	4.14
114	34	"No hizo nada inapropiado"	27 November 2025	3.92
115	35	"Hipotequé esta casa"	28 November 2025	4.53
116	36	"Nos tenemos que separar"	1 December 2025	3.85
117	37	"Nueva oportunidad"	2 December 2025	4.58
118	38	"Soltar lo que no es para nosotros"	3 December 2025	4.25
119	39	"Me voy contigo"	4 December 2025	4.55
120	40	"Vamos a trabajar juntas"	5 December 2025	4.13
121	41	"Siento algo profundo por ti"	8 December 2025	N/A
122	42	"¿Qué haces aquí Lila?"	9 December 2025	4.61
123	43	"Viviré con Tino"	10 December 2025	4.08
124	44	"Acta de divorcio"	11 December 2025	4.01
125	45	"El amor no es suficiente"	12 December 2025	4.24
126	46	"Me gusta eres tú"	15 December 2025	4.08
127	47	"Me hiciste sentir algo"	16 December 2025	4.32
128	48	"Me gusta una chica"	17 December 2025	4.19
129	49	"Lo hacemos oficial"	18 December 2025	N/A
130	50	"Estoy saliendo con Circe"	19 December 2025	N/A
131	51	"No fuiste honesta"	22 December 2025	N/A
132	52	"Ni un beso nos hemos dado"	23 December 2025	N/A
133	53	"Hijito querido"	24 December 2025	N/A
134	54	"Lo mío no son las mujeres"	25 December 2025	N/A
135	55	"Prefiero amargada a mentirosa"	26 December 2025	N/A
136	56	"Troné con Edith"	29 December 2025	N/A
137	57	"El homenaje para Lichita"	30 December 2025	N/A
138	58	"No voy a buscar a Scarlet"	31 December 2025	N/A
139	59	"Se gana más arriesgando"	1 January 2026	N/A
140	60	"¿Te importa más el dinero?"	2 January 2026	N/A
141	61	"Provocó que te alejaras de Aidé"	5 January 2026	4.29
142	62	"¡Terminamos Melina!"	6 January 2026	4.30
143	63	"Esto no es amor"	7 January 2026	4.54
144	64	"Cáncer en la sangre"	8 January 2026	4.58
145	65	"Me encantas"	9 January 2026	4.22
146	66	"Soy tu padre"	12 January 2026	4.14
147	67	"¿Qué pasó hace tres años?"	13 January 2026	4.35
148	68	"¡Hasta aquí llegaste Melina!"	14 January 2026	N/A
149	69	"Te haces pasar por mí"	15 January 2026	4.55
150	70	"¿Quien mató a Lichita?"	16 January 2026	4.30
151	71	"Lichita muere"	19 January 2026	4.35
152	72	"¡Melina estuvo en un psiquiátrico!"	20 January 2026	4.54
153	73	"Primera quimioterapia"	21 January 2026	4.41
154	74	"Solo escúchanos"	22 January 2026	4.73
155	75	"Lila es la madre biológica de Alexander"	23 January 2026	4.29
156	76	"Interrumpir el embarazo"	26 January 2026	4.32
157	77	"Voy a recuperar a Alexander"	27 January 2026	4.13
158	78	"Último suspiro"	28 January 2026	4.68
159	79	"Ella es la verdadera Melina"	29 January 2026	4.98
160	80	"No soy su hermano"	30 January 2026	5.49
161	81	"Estás en el infierno"	1 February 2026	3.62
162	82	"Mi compañero de vida"	1 February 2026	3.62

== Release ==
Papás por siempre premiered first in the United States on Vix on 19 September 2025, with five episodes being released each week. The final two episodes were released on 9 January 2026. In Mexico, the season premiered on Las Estrellas on 13 October 2025.

== Music ==
Papás por siempre (Banda Sonora)

Soundtrack album by Cast of Papás por siempre
- Released: 31 October 2025
- Length: 34:10
- Label: Moon Moosic Records
- Producer: Alejandro Abaroa

Papás por conveniencia chronology
Papás por conveniencia (Banda sonora)	Papás por siempre (Banda Sonora)

Singles from Papás por siempre (Banda Sonora)
- 1. "Es Amor" Released: 3 October 2025; 2. "No Me Rompas El Corazón" Released: 10 October 2025; 3. "Con Un Poquito De Tu Amor" Released: 17 October 2025; 4. "¿Quién Soy Yo?" Released: 24 October 2025

Papás por siempre (Banda Sonora) is the soundtrack album to the season. It was released by Moon Moosic Records on 31 October 2025. Like the soundtrack for the first season, it features new versions of songs from children's telenovelas produced by Rosy Ocampo.

No.	Title	Writer(s)	Performer(s)	Length
1.	"Es Amor"	Alejandro Abaroa; Cristina Abaroa; Pablo Aguirre; Salvador Núñez	Daniela Luján	3:53
2.	"No Me Rompas El Corazón"	C. Abaroa	Martín Ricca	2:58
3.	"Cómplices Al Rescate"	A. Abaroa; C. Abaroa; Aguirre	Daniela Luján; Martín Ricca	2:26
4.	"Medley Nueva Pandilla: Amistad / Esas Pequeñas Cosas"	A. Abaroa; C. Abaroa; Jorge Nazar; Marcelo Buquet; Aguirre	Joaquín Bondoni; María Perroni; Emilio Beltrán; Victoria Viera; Íker García Meza; Gabriel Rolón; Luciana Loera; Cristela Loesca	2:56
5.	"Medley Nueva Pandilla: Lazos / Juntos"	A. Abaroa; Alejandro Carballo; C. Abaroa; Aguirre	Joaquín Bondoni; María Perroni; Emilio Beltrán; Victoria Viera; Íker García Meza; Gabriel Rolón; Luciana Loera; Cristela Loesca	3:38
6.	"Tal Para Cual"	A. Abaroa; C. Abaroa	Luciana Loera; Gabriel Rolón	2:14
7.	"¿Quién Soy Yo?"	A. Abaroa; C. Abaroa; Aguirre	Victoria Viera; Joaquín Bondoni	2:53
8.	"Tan Solo Un Minuto"	A. Abaroa; C. Abaroa	María Perroni; Emilio Beltrán	2:19
9.	"Con Un Poquito De Tu Amor"	A. Abaroa; Carballo	Miguel Martínez	3:33
10.	"Medley Koktel: Pacto De Amor / Pasó Pasó"	A. Abaroa; Claudia Brant; C. Abaroa; Jesús Flores Chapa	Koktel Band	3:37
11.	"Medley Koktel: El Ritmo De La Vida / Todo Puede Suceder"	A. Abaroa; Carballo; C. Abaroa; Luis Pastor; Aguirre	Koktel Band	3:35
Total length:				34:10
