= Play (Mexican band) =

Latin pop Mexican band

- Origin: Mexico
- Genres: Latin Pop
- Years active: 2006–2008, 2024-present
- Label: Warner Music
- Members: Glayds Gallegos; Alejandro Rivera; Roxana Puente; Anhuar Escalante; Michelle Álvarez
- Past members: María Chacón; Miguel Martínez

Play, also known as Grupo Play or Play Now, is a teen Mexican band made in 2006 out of teenagers from the reality show for kids Código F.A.M.A. made by the giant company Televisa. There are 7 members in the band and only 6 out of 7 of the band were in a telenovela from Televisa. They have already had their debut CD released in Mexico. In their official website they state that their reality show, and telenovelas Código F.A.M.A., Alegrijes y Rebujos, and Mision S.O.S is behind them. The group disbanded in 2007 because of problems with their record label.

In 2024, after a 16-year absence, the group returned to the stage as special guests on the 2000's [sic] X Siempre tour. From that point on, they officially resumed their career under a new name, Play Now, now consisting only of Gladys, Alex, Roxana, Ánhuar, and Michelle. María and Miguel are no longer part of this new phase of the project. On November 20, 2024, they released a new version of the song that first brought them fame, “Amor Mío.”

== Discography ==
- Días Que No Vuelven (2006)

== Members ==
- Michelle Álvarez
- Gladys Gallegos (received silver medal in Código F.A.M.A. 1)
- Alejandro Rivera
- Roxana Puente
- Anhuar Escalante (participated in Código F.A.M.A. 2)

=== Past members ===
- Miguel Martínez (winner of Código F.A.M.A. 1)
- María Chacón (received silver medal in Código F.A.M.A. 1)
