= Michelle Álvarez =

Mexican actress and singer

- Born: Monterrey, Nuevo León, Mexico
- Occupations: Actress, singer
- Years active: 1999-present
- Musical career
- Genres: Latin pop; Pop
- Instrument: Vocals
- Member of: Play

Michelle Álvarez is a Mexican actress and singer. In 2002 she was a contestant in Código F.A.M.A, and, the next year, still a teenager, she played in the telenovela Alegrijes y Rebujos. She played in other television productions, including La rosa de Guadalupe, before starting a career in music as composer and singer.

== Filmography ==
Telenovelas, Series, Films, TV Show
Year	Title	Role	Notes
1999	Through Dead Eyes	Young Girl	
2004	Alegrijes y Rebujos	Ernestina "Tina" Garza Aguayo	5 episodes
2004-05	Misión S.O.S	La Chaneque Dorada	1 episode
2005-06	Peregrina	Brenda	4 episodes
2006	Mujer casos de la vida real		4 episodes
2008	La rosa de Guadalupe		7 episodes
