= Nora Cano =

Mexican actress and singer

- Born: Nora Anaís Cano Luna; Mexico City, Mexico
- Occupation(s): Actress, singer
- Years active: 2002–present

Nora Cano (born Nora Anaís Cano Luna on in Mexico City, Mexico) is a Mexican actress and singer. She known for music reality show Codigo F.A.M.A. who finished in 10th position.

== Biography ==
In 2004 she played Lechugona in Misión S.O.S produced by Rosy Ocampo.

As a singer she has participated in diverse musical projects, in the Codigo F.A.M.A. contest, recorded CD with their participation, later due to the success of the telenovela Alegrijes y rebujos they were recorded two disks called "Disco Alegrije" and "Disco Rebujo" besides making a promo of the discs "Navidad Rebujo" and "Navidad Alegrije" where they recorded 4 carols as well as concerts in the most important stages of Mexico Estadio Azteca, National Auditorium and the same Zócalo of the Capital before 140 thousand attendees, also participated in Teletón Mexico of 2003 and were the lucky ones to record the theme "Lo hacemos todos".

== Filmography ==
Television, Telenovelas
Year	Title	Role	Notes
2002/03	Codigo F.A.M.A.	Herself/Contestant	Reality show, Season:1
2003/04	Alegrijes y rebujos	Nayelli Sánchez Gómez	Supporting role
2004/05	Misión S.O.S	Lechugona	Special appearance

== Discography ==
- Código Fama (2003)
- Disco Alegrije (2003)
- Disco Rebujo (2003)
- Navidad Alegrije (2003)
- Navidad Rebujo (2003)
- Alegrijes y Rebujos en concierto DVD (2004)
