= Llena de amor =

2010 Mexican TV series

- Genre: Telenovela
- Based on: Mi Gorda Bella by Carolína Espada
- Written by: Rossana Negrín; Juan Carlos Alcalá
- Directed by: Sergio Cataño
- Starring: Valentino Lanús; César Évora; Laura Flores; Alexis Ayala; Roberto Ballesteros; Azela Robinson; Armando Araiza; Roberto Palazuelos; Altaír Jarabo; Ariadne Díaz
- Theme music composer: Llena de amor by Luis Fonsi
- Country of origin: Mexico
- Original language: Spanish
- No. of episodes: 202

Production
- Executive producer: Angelli Nesma Medina
- Producer: J. Ignacio Alarcón
- Production locations: Cancún, Xcaret
- Editors: Octavio Lopez; Daniel Rentería
- Running time: 41-44 minutes
- Production company: Televisa

Original release
- Network: Canal de las Estrellas
- Release: May 3, 2010 – February 13, 2011

Llena de amor (English: Filled With Love) is a Mexican Spanish-language telenovela, produced by Angelli Nesma Medina for Televisa. It is a remake of the Venezuelan telenovela Mi Gorda Bella, which itself was inspired by the Colombian telenovela Yo soy Betty, la fea.

It stars, Ariadne Díaz, Valentino Lanús, César Évora, Laura Flores, Altaír Jarabo, Armando Araiza, Azela Robinson, Alexis Ayala, Roberto Ballesteros and Roberto Palazuelos.

== Plot ==
Marianela Ruiz y de Teresa is a sweet, overweight girl. She graduates with honors from a private school and returns to Mexico to live with her mother, Eva Ruiz y de Teresa and attends university. Her mother is killed in a helicopter accident by one of her own fans, Gerardo Torres. After her death, Marianela is sent to live with her uncle, Emiliano, and his wife, Fedra, along with her cousins, Emmanuel, Kristel, Gretel, and Axel.

Fedra is a cruel, money-hungry woman who has always envied Eva and hates Marianela because of her weight and because of the money she will inherit from her mother. Marianela is treated horribly by Fedra, Kristel, and Ilitia; however Axel and Gretel are supportive of her and Emmanuel is kind to her and calls her "gordita hermosa." Emmanuel has always been Marianela's love interest since childhood. Over time, Emmanuel develops feelings for Marianela and realizes he loves her.

Marianela also has a very supportive aunt, Netty who is an actress, and friends, Brandon, Doris, and Oliver. Fedra schemes and steals Marianela's inheritance from her mother, with a forged will that names her the sole beneficiary of Eva's money. Fedra tries to kill Marianela many times. She puts poison in chocolates that Emmanuel gives her and she plays tricks on her. Fedra is the one that killed Eva as well as her father. Gretel saw the whole thing and is faced with the crisis that makes people believe she is crazy.

Emmanuel asks Marianela to marry him. She says yes and then tells their family. Fedra, Kristel, Axel, and Ilitia are against them getting married. Axel was against it because after an accident where he almost lost his life, Fedra sabotaged him to make him hate Marianela, but everyone else was happy for them. Ilitia was Emmanuel's ex-girlfriend and is "in love" with him. She is so angry that she and Kristel play a prank to stop the marriage. When Emmanuel goes to work that same day, Ilitia plans a bachelor party for him. The workers and Emmanuel get drunk. While they are getting drunk, Kristel goes to Marianela and gives her a fake invitation to Emmanuel and Ilitia's wedding. While Kristel tries to convince Marianela not to marry Emmanuel, Ilitia sends the workers home. Emmanuel falls asleep and then she puts Emmanuel on the bed, takes his shirt off, then she takes her clothes off and gets on top of him. Kristel takes Marianela to Emmanuel's workplace; when Marianela sees them, she leaves crying. Marianela calls her aunt in Spain and tells her she wants to visit her. Her aunt agrees.

Emmanuel goes to Marianela's house the following day and finds out she is leaving. He rushes to the airport and tries to stop her, but he could not because he arrives too late. Emmanuel goes outside and sees her plane take off. Two guys go behind him and kidnap him. They put him in a truck; there is no one driving the truck and he has an accident. When Emmanuel wakes up in a hospital, he cannot move his legs. At the same time, Marianela arrives in Spain and ends up in the hospital after she faints. The doctor tells her that she was poisoned, and the person who poisoned her knew that she could not resist. Marianela gives the chocolates to the doctor, and after examining them, he confirms that the chocolates had poison in them. He also advises her to lose weight because being overweight could give her various health problems. Marianela believes it was Emanuel who poisoned her when in reality it was Fedra and Bernardo.

Marianela starts to exercise and, at the same time, Emmanuel starts therapy to walk again. Two years later, Marianela loses a lot of weight by this time and Emmanuel is able to walk again. Emmanuel asks Ilitia to marry him after winning a race but is still in love with Marianela. Emmanuel announces that he and Ilitia are to get married. Back in Spain, Aunt Carlota becomes ill. When they receive a phone call, Fedra flies to Spain to kill Carlota after making her sign papers to transfer her money to Fedra while Marianela was at a business trip with Jorge a man who says is deeply in love with her.

While Fedra is in Spain, Marianela returns to Mexico when she finds out Emmanuel is getting married with Ilitia. On her wedding day, Ilitia is raped by Mauricio Fonseca. Marianela goes to Netty's house but the only one there is Doris. She talks with her and she finds out that Doris is a makeup artist. She asks her if she could disguise her. Ilitia arrives late to her wedding. During the ceremony, Marianela arrives but no one is able to recognize her due to her weight loss and her disguise. During the party they ask what her name is and she lies by saying her name is Victoria de la Garza. She goes into an office in the house and there she finds herself with Lirio de Plata. He ties her up and robs the place then leaves and Emilano goes in and unties her before the police arrive. She tells Brandon she is friends with Marianela. The next day Brandon takes her to Netty's house. She stays at Netty's house and brings with her Gretel, who is disguised as Victoria's younger brother Manolo. "Victoria" gets hired by Emiliano to work in the family company. Later

A short time afterwards, Victoria gets control of the family company by orders of Marianela. Later, Marianela falls in love with Lirio De Plata without knowing it is actually Emmanuel and she becomes pregnant. Ilitia is pregnant with Brandon's baby. She discovers the truth about the pregnancy while Emanuel finally understands why he feels as if he is in love with two women: Marianela and Victoria are the same person yet he acts as if he does not know. He makes Marianela fall in love twice like she did with him. It is revealed that Gretel is the real daughter of Paula and Máximo.

He pretends to be paralyzed to assassinate Bernardo, but he kills himself with a shot to the head and reveals to Lorenzo when he beat Axel, that he is his biological son. The Captain José Maria Sevilla (El Lirio de Plata), Emmanuel's biological father, sacrifices him and is killed by a corrupt policeman by order of Mauricio Fonseca, who also tried to kill Brandon, Ilitia and his mother Camila by orders of he and Fedra. But Lorenzo managed to kill Mauricio for raping his daughter Ilitia. and Gerardo the murderer of Eva Pavón, Marianela's mother for trying to escape.

Fedra and Lorenzo kidnaps both, Emanuel and Marianela, and took them to a secret hotel in Cancun built with Marianela's father (Luis Felipe Ruiz y de Teresa) inheritance money. Lorenzo fools Fedra, making her believe that Marianela was poisoned, but, actually, Lorenzo only hit her with his gun on her back; meanwhile, believing that Marianela was poisoned, Fedra fools Emanuel, making him believe that Marianela was dying and he reveals to Fedra that Marianela was pregnant. Soon before Emanuel noticed that Marianela was not dying, Lorenzo shoots at him and kidnaps Fedra in revenge for trying to kill his daughter. Marianela did save Emanuel from drowning, but Fedra is burned alive by Lorenzo, but right before he does, Fedra confess that her only child with Emiliano was Kristel. Brandon and Oliver shoot and kill Lorenzo, but Fedra dies, consumed by the flames, yelling Emanuel's name. Oliver and Brandon tells Emiliano everything that happened during Lorenzo and Fedra's death, and also tell him that Kristel was his only biological daughter, but he responds that no matter what, they were all gonna be their children anyway.

In the end, Kristel marries Jorge, but they divorce. Gretel and Oliver marry and have two daughters. Ilitia and Brandon have four children. Emiliano and Netty get married as well. Axel and Delicia stay married and have a son. And Marianela and Emmanuel marry and have two daughters. She opens up a center for childhood obesity and names the center after her mother. They all live happily ever after, except for Kristel who cannot find a perfect match.

== Cast ==
=== Main ===
Actor	Character
Valentino Lanús	Emmanuel Sevilla Pérez / El Lirio de Plata Jr.
César Évora	Emiliano Ruiz y de Teresa
Laura Flores	Ernestina "Netty" Pavón Romero de Ruiz y de Teresa
Alexis Ayala	Lorenzo Porta-López
Roberto Ballesteros	Bernardo Izquierdo
Azela Robinson / Zoraida Gómez (Young)	Fedra Curiel de Ruiz y Teresa / Juana Felipa Pérez Fernández de Sevilla "La Reina"
Armando Araiza	Brandon Moreno Cervantes
Roberto Palazuelos	Mauricio Fonseca Lombardi
Altaír Jarabo	Ilitia Porta-López Santibáñez de Moreno
Ariadne Díaz	Marianela Ruiz y de Teresa Pavón de Sevilla / Victoria de la Garza Montiel de Jauma

=== Secondary ===
Actor	Character
Aarón Hernán	Máximo Ruiz y de Teresa
Maricarmen Vela	Carlota Ruiz y de Teresa
Angelina Peláez	Mamá Dolores
Tina Romero	Paula De Franco de Ruiz y de Teresa
Eduardo Liñán	León Garduño
Luis Uribe / Marcelo Córdoba (Young)	Cap. José María Sevilla "El Lirio de Plata"
Cecilia Gabriela	Camila "Muñeca" Rivero de Porta-López
Carlos Cobos	Benigno Cruz
Héctor Sáez	Deputy Agustín Tejeda
Paty Martínez	Gladiola Cervantes de Moreno
Marcela Páez	Consuelo
Rafael Amador	Fidel Mendoza
Rosíta Pelayo	Flora
Lorena Enríquez	Dorothy "Doris" Moreno Cervantes
Ricardo Margaleff	Oliver Rosales / Graciela Agustina "Chelatina" Lozano
Diego Amozurrutia	Axel Porta-López Pérez
María Elisa Camargo	Kristel Ruiz y de Teresa Pérez de Jauma
Cristina Mason	Gretel Ruiz y de Teresa de Franco De Rosales / Manolo de la Garza Montiel
Ivonne Ley	Nereida Pérez
Mariana Van Rankin	Delicia Flores de Porta-López
Manuela Ímaz	Fabiola Fonseca
Michelle Renaud	Lorena Fonseca
Karla Sofía Gascón	Jorge Jauma
Alberto Agnesi	André Silva
Lili Goret	Carolina
Lucía Méndez	Eva Pavón Romero de Ruiz y de Teresa

=== Special participation ===
Actor	Character
Otto Sirgo	Juez Félix Pantoja
Roberto Blandón	Ricardo
Raúl Magaña	Luis Felipe Ruiz y de Teresa
Teo Tapia	Lic. Ordaz
Vanessa Arias	Jacqueline Pereyra
Lízetta Romo	Almudena Rodríguez
Martín Cuburu	Lic. Eugenio Pacheco
Gína Pedret	Ángela
Rebeca Mankíta	Mayela Santibáñez
Sergío Jurado	Dr. Arnoldo
Ricardo Vera	Lic. Rivas
Ricardo Franco	Alfredo
Alejandro Felipe	Javier
Fernanda López	Begoña Riquelme
Mariana Quiroz	Manzanita
Gabriela Goldsmith	Fedra de Curiel (Real)
Oscar Traven	Aristóteles Curiel
Paula Encinas	Zorayda Ruiz y de Teresa Curiel
Luis Fonsi	Himself

== Awards and nominations ==
Year	Award	Category	Recipient	Result
2011	29th TVyNovelas Awards	Best Telenovela of the Year	Llena de amor	Nominated
2011	29th TVyNovelas Awards	Best Actor	Valentino Lanús	Nominated
2011	29th TVyNovelas Awards	Best Antagonist Actor	Alexis Ayala	Nominated
2011	29th TVyNovelas Awards	Best Antagonist Actress	Azela Robinson	Nominated
2011	29th TVyNovelas Awards	Best Young Lead Actor	Diego Amozurrutia	Nominated
2011	29th TVyNovelas Awards	Best Female Revelation	Cristina Mason	Nominated
2011	29th TVyNovelas Awards	Best Musical Theme	"Llena de amor" by Luis Fonsi	Nominated
