= Leticia Perdigón =

Mexican film and television actress (born 1956)

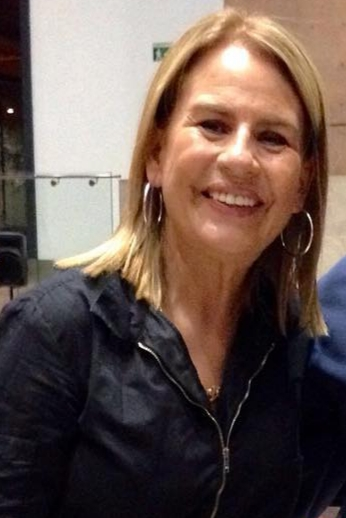
- Born: Guadalupe Leticia Perdigón Labrador; August 7, 1956 (age 69); Mexico City, Mexico
- Occupation: Actress
- Years active: 1973-present

Leticia Perdigón (Spanish pronunciation: [leˈtisja peɾðiˈɣon]; born Guadalupe Leticia Perdigón Labrador on August 7, 1956, in Mexico City, Mexico) is a Mexican film and television actress who has appeared in more than forty TV shows and fifty films since 1973.

== Selected filmography ==
=== Television ===
Year	Title	Role	Notes
1973	Mi rival	Unknown role	
1974	Mundo de juguete	Irma	
1976	Mundos opuestos	Beba	
1978	Gotita de gente	Sofía	
1978	Viviana	Azafata	
1979	Los ricos también lloran	Lili	
1980	Al rojo vivo	Emilia	
1982	Vivir enamorada	María	
1983	Profesión: Señora	Unknown role	
1983	Amalia Batista	Reyna	
1984	Cosas de casados	Unknown role	
1987	Las solteras del dos	Unknown role	
1989	El cristal empañado	Mercedes	
1989	Balada por un amor	Lucía Allende	
1990	Pelo gallo	Carmen	
1992	Carrusel de las Américas	Unknown role	
1993	Clarisa	Aurelia Bracho Sanabria	
1994–03	Mujer, casos de la vida real	Various roles	8 episodes
1995	Acapulco, cuerpo y alma	Rita	
1995	María José	Esther	
1997	Desencuentro	Chaquira	
1999	Nunca te olvidaré	Gudelia	
2000	Primer amor, a mil por hora	Catalina Guerra de Luna	
2001	Primer amor, tres años después	Catalina Guerra de Luna	Television film
2001	Salomé	Lola	
2002	Así son ellas	Margarita Saavedra Corcuera	
2004	Cancionera	Unknown role	
2004–06	Rebelde	Mayra Fernández	
2006–07	Código postal	Esperanza Santos	
2007–08	Al diablo con los guapos	Socorro Luna	
2008–10	La rosa de Guadalupe	Martha / Soledad	2 episodes
2009	Adictos	Teté	5 episodes
2009	Hermanos y detectives	Mamá de Sebastián	Episode: "El profesor Fuentes"
2009–2010	Hasta que el dinero nos separe	Doña Leonor Núñez de Medina	
2010	Mujeres asesinas	Margarita "Maggie" Olvera	Episode: "Maggie, pensionada"
2011	La fuerza del destino	Arcelia Galván	
2011–15	Como dice el dicho	Lidia / Soraya / Amalia	4 episodes
2012	Por ella soy Eva	Silvia Romero de Moreno	
2013	Mentir para vivir	Matilde Aresti de Camargo	
2014	The Stray Cat	La Jarocha	
2015	Hasta el fin del mundo	Guadalupe	
2016	Tres veces Ana	Doña Chana	
2017	Papá a toda madre	Catalina Sánchez	
2018	Por amar sin ley	Susana de López	
2021	Vencer el pasado	Sonia	
2024	Marea de pasiones	Amanda	
2024	Papás por conveniencia	Bertha	Main cast
2025	Papás por siempre	Bertha	Guest star
2026	Tan cerca de ti, nace el amor	Carmen Delgado	
