= Cecilia Gabriela =

Mexican actress

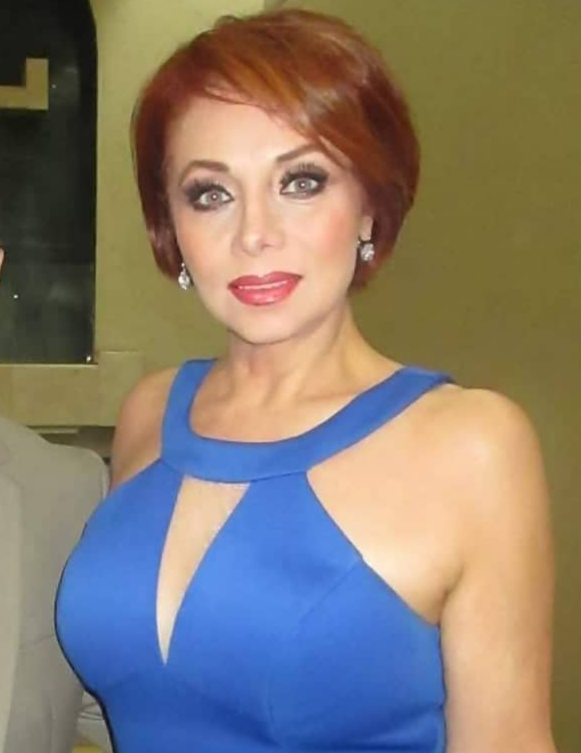
- Born: Cecilia Gabriela Vera Sandoval; January 9, 1962 (age 64); Mexico City, Mexico
- Occupation: Actress
- Years active: 1985-present
- Spouse: Marco Uriel (1993-2012)
- Children: Regina Uriel

Cecilia Gabriela Vera Sandoval (Spanish pronunciation: [seˈsilja ɣaˈβɾjela] born January 9, 1962) is a Mexican actress known best for her work in telenovelas.

She was born in Mexico City.

== Filmography ==
Telenovelas, Films, TV-Series, Theater
Year	Title	Role	Notes
1985	Tú o nadie	Secretary	Guest role
1985	Juana Iris	Nora	Guest role
1985	Vivir un poco	María José	Supporting role
1987-1988	Victoria	Eloisa	Supporting role
1988	Flor y Canela		Supporting role
1988	El Pecado de Oyuki	Yuriko "Lily" Pointer	Supporting role
1989-1990	Carrusel	Roxana de del Salto	Supporting role
1990	Mi pequeña Soledad	Clara	Supporting role
1991-1992	Valeria y Maximiliano	Dulce Landero	Main role
1993	La última esperanza	Jennifer Lascuráin	Main role
1994	El Arrecife de los alacranes	Mónica	Film
1994-1995	Imperio de cristal	Esther de Lombardo	Supporting role
1995	Bajo un mismo rostro	Magdalena de Covarrubias	Guest role
1995-1996	Acapulco, cuerpo y alma	Cynthia Montalvo	Supporting role
1997	Amada enemiga	Cecilia Sandoval	Main role
1998	Vivo por Elena	Consuelo "Chelo" Carvajal	Main role
2000	El precio de tu amor	Julia	Guest role
2000–2001	Carita de ángel	Victoria Torres de Montesinos	22 episodes
2002	Cómplices al rescate	Regina Ontiveros de Del Valle/Tania Vermont	Main role
2002-03	Así son ellas	Violeta Carmona	Special Appearance
2003	Niña amada mía	Consuelo Mendiola de Izaguirre	Supporting role
2003-2004	Alegrijes y Rebujos	Mercedes Goyeneche de Dominguez #2	Supporting role
2005	La madrastra	Daniela Márquez de Rivero	Supporting role
2006	Heridas de amor	Young Bertha de Aragón	Guest role
2007	Mujer, casos de la vida real		Various Episodes
2007	Muchachitas como tú	Verónica Vásquez	Supporting role
2008-2009	Juro Que Te Amo	Leonora Cassis Zuloaga de Lazcano	Main role
2009	Los simuladores 2		2 Episodes
2009	Mujeres Asesinas 2	Susana Saavedra	Episode: Carmen, honrada
2009	12 mujeres en pugna		Theatrical Performance
2009	Mañana es para siempre	Altagracia Linares de Elizalde	Guest role
2010-2011	Llena de amor	Camila "Muñeca" Rivero de Porta-López	Supporting role
2011-13	Como dice el dicho		3 Episodes
2012	Cachito de Cielo	Isabel Obregón vda. de Gómez	Main role
2013	Mentir para vivir	Lucina González	Supporting role
2014	Qué Pobres Tan Ricos	Rita	Guest role
2015–2016	A que no me dejas	Raquel de Fonseca	Supporting role
2017	Mi adorable maldición	Corina Pineda "Corinne"	Supporting role
2018	Mi marido tiene más familia	Dra. Tania	Guest role
2022	La madrastra	Emilia Zetina de Rivas	Supporting role
2024	Papás por conveniencia	Pura	

== Awards and nominations ==
=== Premios TVyNovelas ===
Year	Category	Telenovela	Result
1989	Best Female Revelation	El Pecado de Oyuki	Nominated
1999	Best Co-star Actress	Vivo por Elena	Nominated
2014	Best Co-star Actress	Mentir para vivir	Nominated
2016	Best Co-star Actress	A que no me dejas	Nominated
