= La doble vida de Estela Carrillo =

Mexican telenovela

- Genre: Telenovela
- Screenplay by: Carmen Madrid; Pablo Aramendi
- Story by: Claudia Velazco; Pedro Armando Rodríguez
- Directed by: Alejandro Álvarez Ceniceros; Rodrigo Hernández; Benjamín Cann
- Creative director: Florencio Zavala
- Starring: Ariadne Díaz; David Zepeda; África Zavala; Danilo Carrera; Erika Buenfil
- Theme music composer: Joss Favela
- Opening theme: "Y me pregunto" by Julión Álvarez
- Country of origin: Mexico
- Original language: Spanish
- No. of seasons: 1
- No. of episodes: 72

Production
- Executive producer: Rosy Ocampo
- Producers: María Alba Espinosa; Eduardo Meza
- Cinematography: Poncho Mendoza; Manuel Barajas
- Editor: Pablo Peralta
- Camera setup: Multi-camera
- Running time: 60 minutes
- Production company: Televisa

Original release
- Network: Las Estrellas
- Release: February 13 – May 21, 2017

La doble vida de Estela Carrillo is a Mexican telenovela produced by Eduardo Meza, that premiered on 13 February 2017 on Las Estrellas. The first season was produced by Rosy Ocampo and consists of 72 episodes. It stars Ariadne Díaz as the titular character, alongside David Zepeda, África Zavala, Danilo Carrera and Erika Buenfil, in the main roles.

On May 9, 2017, Eduardo Meza confirmed that the series would be renewed for a second season.

On March 12, 2018, the magazine People en Español, confirmed that the telenovela had been canceled for the moment and that it is not yet planned to produce a second season, at least during 2018.

== Synopsis ==
The season tells the story of Laura Oviedo, an undocumented woman living in the United States under the identity of Estela Carrillo, who dreams of being the star of a musical band. However, destiny takes her to work as a teacher in Riverside, California, where she witnesses a shooting and, overnight, becomes a hero for having saved the lives of her students in it. However, her status makes her refuse to receive any recognition, for fear of being discovered.

== Cast ==
=== Main ===
- Ariadne Díaz as Estela Carrillo / Laura Oviedo: She is mother of Paloma and was a music teacher for a group of young Hispanics at a Foundation in Los Angeles, California before being fired.
- David Zepeda as Ryan Cabrera: He is the director and heir of "Furia Productions", the leading producing company of Mexican Regional music and events in Los Angeles.
- África Zavala as Morgana Santos: She is the lover of Danilo and ex-vocalist of the group Los jerarcas de la Sierra.
- Danilo Carrera as Danilo Cabrera: He is the son that Walter Cabrera had with his lover and half brother of Ryan; he leads the band of Los jerarcas de la Sierra.
- Erika Buenfil as Mercy Cabrera: She is the mother of Ryan and Walter's widow, with whom she founded Furia Productions many years ago.

=== Supporting, recurring ===
- Alejandro Tommasi as John Blake Green "Mr. Blake": He is a businessman, with the highest level of relations with US politicians and businessmen.
- Zaide Silvia Gutiérrez as Rosario Hinojosa: She is Estela's chosen family. Her maternal instinct has led her to become Paloma's "grandmother," and Estela's tireless companion and confidante.
- Vanessa Bauche as Leticia Jiménez: She befriends Estela as they are saved from a migratory raid.
- Marco Méndez as Asdrúbal Guerrero: He is the right arm of a famous money launderer known as El Dorado.
- Lourdes Reyes as Luisa Almeida: She is the faithful companion of Mr. Blake, of whom she has been grateful to save her life.
- Adrián Di Monte as Joe Hernández: He is the lawyer of Furia Productions. He is Mexican-American. He entered at a young age to work in Furia Productions, and with time became the protected one of Walter Cabrera.
- Mike Biaggio as Fausto Galindo: He is a man obsessed with money and owner of the bar "La Toña".
- Franklin Virgüez as El Talismán: He is one of the murderers who works for El Dorado.
- Claudia Ríos as Antonia Flores "La Toña": She is one of the criminals that manages a network of prostitution.
- Luis Uribe as Néstor Aguilera / Lucio Galván "El Dorado"
- Andrés Zuno as Tom: He was Leticia's violent husband before being killed by Danilo.
- Alex Perea as Tadeo: He's Leticia's only and oldest son who later reveals to be gay.
- Carlos Speitzer as Trinidad Huerta "El Calao": He is one of the men who works for El Dorado.
- Adriana Ahumada as María: Leticia's only daughter, who let her friends influence her and had a sexual relationship with a boy to "fit in".
- Tania Lizardo as Nina
- Armando Torrea as Steve
- Lara Campos as Paloma: Estela's daughter.
- Yany Prado as Génesis: Estela's friend whom she met at Furia
- Ermis Cruz as Wilmer Gutiérrez "Chavalín": He helped Laura become Estela Carrillo by giving her a false identity.
- Omar Medina as Erasmo Quintanilla
- Marco Corleone as Xenófobo
- Luis Xavier as Soto
- Hector Cruz as Osiel
- Carlos Athié as Porfirio Pineda "El Barón"
- Mauricio de Montellano as Ausencio Granados
- Sara Corrales as Real Estela Carrillo "El Dorado"
- Juan Carlos Barreto as Don Silverio Pineda "El Sagrado"
- Delia Casanova as Doña Herminia
- Alfredo Adame as Don Pedro Carrillo González
- César Évora as Don Walter Cabrera
- Ramiro Fumazoni as Juez Andrew Norman

== Production ==
The telenovela officially confirmed the beginning of production on November 10, 2016.

=== Development ===
And we find a story that is based on real facts, is a real life story of a woman, who just a Mexican woman who went through a series of vicissitudes and who was made to be excellent to be able to move to a soap opera.

— Rosy Ocampo, La Opinión México

The series is based on migration, the American dream, the regional and northern music, and narcotrafico. Rosy Ocampo confirmed that the series is based on facts of real life, and a case that happened to a Mexican woman in particular. While in the program, Todo para la mujer, Ocampo stated, "I visited Tijuana, Monterrey, and several cities and Los Angeles, to look for interesting topics for the series and found the case of a woman in particular." This would be the last production of Rosy Ocampo for the producing company Televisa, after she announced that she would not renew her contract. For the main theme of the series, Mexican singer Julión Álvarez was chosen, and he would also have a short participation. Los Cardenales de Nuevo León confirmed that their theme "Porque me ocultas" would be part of the soundtrack of the series and used for several scenes. On January 20, 2016, the debut of Ariadne Díaz as a singer was confirmed, with the theme "Para que tú me amaras", which is part of the telenovela.

== Episodes ==
=== Series overview ===
Season	Episodes	Originally released		First aired	Last aired
Season	Episodes	First released	Last released	First aired	Last aired
1	72	February 13, 2017	May 21, 2017	May 8, 2017	August 18, 2017

No.	Title	Original release date	U.S. Original air date	US viewers (millions)
1	"Apareció Estela"	February 13, 2017	May 8, 2017	2.45
Due to an event at the Everwood Foundation, Estela's identity is affected, as Ryan looks for her to help him out of jail.
2	"Ryan y Estela hacen un trato"	February 14, 2017	May 9, 2017	1.78
Ryan discovers that Estela is an impostor and proposes a deal for them both to benefit.
3	"Danilo y Ryan se conocen"	February 15, 2017	May 10, 2017	1.67
Ryan leaves jail and Danilo can finally meet his half brother; meanwhile, Estela is in serious trouble and loses her job.
4	"Danilo trata de chantajear a Mercy"	February 16, 2017	May 11, 2017	1.81
Danilo discovers the relationship between Mercy and Joe and tries to take advantage of it, as his intention is to find out if his father left something in the will.
5	"Danilo acepta la ayuda de El Dorado"	February 17, 2017	May 12, 2017	1.74
Danilo accepts the help of El Dorado and agrees to follow his instructions in order to see his band grow.
6	"La lectura del testamento"	February 20, 2017	May 15, 2017	1.65
The Cabrera family finally hears the last will of Walter, but Mercy takes a great surprise when learning she isn't to receive any actions.
7	"Ryan y Danilo pelearán por Paloma"	February 21, 2017	May 16, 2017	1.82
Ryan and Danilo will do whatever it takes to keep the remaining 20% of the shares of Furia Productions, which is why they will fight for Paloma to be registered as their daughter.
8	"Danilo le pone una trampa a Don Chayo"	February 22, 2017	May 17, 2017	1.78
Danilo sets a trap on Don Chayo, and he shoots, without wanting to, at Rubén. With this fact, Danilo assures that his band is the stellar one in the Jaripeo.
9	"Estela salva a Furia Productions"	February 23, 2017	May 18, 2017	1.79
Estela saves the situation between Don Chayo and Furia Productions, managing to get both parties to win. With this act, Danilo does not get his job and is out of the Jaripeo.
10	"Ryan investiga la relación entre Mercy y Carrillo"	February 24, 2017	May 19, 2017	1.67
Ryan investigates Mercy to know her relationship with Pedro Carrillo, but she denies everything and tries to leave the interrogation feeling bad.
11	"La policía detiene a Estela"	February 27, 2017	May 22, 2017	1.86
Estela is arrested by the police and fears that the law will sport. Ryan finds out about her disappearance and immediately begins looking for her.
12	"Laura se despide de Ryan"	February 28, 2017	May 23, 2017	1.73
Laura decides to get away from Ryan's life for fear of losing control of her emotions, as she hopelessly ended up falling in love with him.
13	"Ryan y Estela hacen el amor"	March 1, 2017	May 24, 2017	1.68
Estela looks for Ryan and confesses her feelings to him immediately after being threatened.
14	"El tormentoso pasado de Estela"	March 2, 2017	May 25, 2017	1.41
Estela recalls those days when her life was hell with Fausto and La Toña, who exploited her sexually.
15	"Furia Productions acepta a El Dorado como socio"	March 3, 2017	May 26, 2017	1.47
Danilo and Lucio Galván convince Ryan to accept the deal of Lucio being a partner in Furia Productions. Ryan signs the papers, and El Dorado begins his grand plan.
16	"Ryan le cuenta su pasado a Estela"	March 6, 2017	May 29, 2017	1.73
Ryan talks directly to Estela and clarifies everything about his past and his bad moments in the addiction clinic, but it is not enough since the trust between them is over.
17	"Asdrúbal pone en riesgo la vida de Paloma"	March 7, 2017	May 30, 2017	1.77
The life of Estela's daughter is put at risk because Asdrúbal sends El Talismán to cause a respiratory failure to Paloma.
18	"Morgana usa sus encantos con Ryan"	March 8, 2017	May 31, 2017	1.77
Morgana comes dangerously close to Ryan and manages to steal a kiss, but just then Estela arrives and discovers them.
19	"Fausto reaparece frente a Estela"	March 9, 2017	June 1, 2017	1.64
Estela remembers her stormy past to see Fausto again. Now that she knows that he is back in her life, Estela fears that both Paloma and her are in danger.
20	"Morgana y Estela pelean"	March 10, 2017	June 2, 2017	1.65
Danilo fires Morgana from the band to give her place to Estela. A raging Morgana arrives at Furia to reclaim and put Estela in her place.
21	"Danilo hace un trato con Estela"	March 13, 2017	June 5, 2017	1.74
Danilo learns of the great secret that Laura hides and decides to make a deal with her, to prevent his beggar with money laundering from falling down.
22	"La Regia aparece en los escenarios"	March 14, 2017	June 6, 2017	1.61
Estela makes her debut as a singer under the name of "Regia" and is now the new voice of the Jerarcas de la Sierra.
23	"Danilo presenta a La Regia con El Dorado"	March 15, 2017	June 7, 2017	1.64
Danilo takes Estela with El Dorado so that she interprets her songs and puts herself to his service. From now on, Regia belongs to him.
24	"Ryan quiere proteger a Paloma"	March 16, 2017	June 8, 2017	1.75
Ryan asks Estela to give him custody of Paloma, since Danilo is in danger.
25	"Furia Productions lanza a Morgana como solista"	March 17, 2017	June 9, 2017	1.51
Danilo gives Morgana a chance to release an album as a soloist. Ryan learns of this and agrees to keep his brother away from Estela.
26	"Ryan se decepciona de Mercy"	March 20, 2017	June 12, 2017	1.62
Rita reveals to Ryan that Mercy was involved in Estela's assault.
27	"Danilo pone a todos en problemas"	March 21, 2017	June 13, 2017	1.73
Ryan discovers the fraud that Danilo performs in Furia Productions and fears that everyone will go to jail because of him. Meanwhile, Estela is deceived to sing a narcocorrido, which gets her in problems with El Dorado.
28	"Ryan descubre la relación entre Joe y Mercy"	March 22, 2017	June 14, 2017	1.62
Ryan discovers the relationship of Joe and Mercy, while Danilo kills El Dorado and entangles Estela in his problems.
29	"Danilo se convierte en "El Dorado""	March 23, 2017	June 15, 2017	1.75
Asdrúbal commits Danilo to become the new leader and handle several businesses at the same time, while both Ryan and Estela find out how to get to the real Dorado and save Furia.
30	"Paloma es secuestrada"	March 24, 2017	June 16, 2017	1.62
Paloma is kidnapped by Porfirio Pineda and now the life of the butterfly (as she's called) is in the hands of Danilo. Estela and Ryan will try to find her.
31	"Danilo mata a Porfirio"	March 27, 2017	June 19, 2017	1.82
Danilo rescues Paloma and kills Porfirio without pity. Estela and Ryan decide to obey the orders of Danilo to avoid that this damages them, now that Danilo has more power thanks to El Dorado.
32	"Estela y Danilo se comprometen"	March 28, 2017	June 20, 2017	1.68
Danilo asks for Estela's hand to prevent her from seeing Ryan again. To secure the wedding, Danilo threatens to tell the truth about Laura Oviedo.
33	"Regia no se casa"	March 29, 2017	June 21, 2017	1.61
Regia makes her official presentation on stage and leaves Danilo enraged when she cancels the wedding in front of the entire audience.
34	"El Talismán mata al Calao"	March 30, 2017	June 22, 2017	1.57
Calao takes orders from Danilo to kill Ryan, but in trying, El Talismán blocks him and ends up murdering him.
35	"Asdrúbal peleará por el amor de Estela"	March 31, 2017	June 23, 2017	1.41
Asdrúbal makes it clear to Estela that he will fight for her, regardless of Ryan or Danilo.
36	"Mr. Blake y Asdrúbal se unen"	April 3, 2017	June 26, 2017	1.83
Asdrúbal seeks to be an ally of Mr. Blake so that together they can destroy Furia Productions and make Estela suffer.
37	"Estela y Paloma en manos de Mr.Blake"	April 4, 2017	June 27, 2017	1.73
Mr. Blake begins his revenge and takes Paloma and Estela hostage with the help of Luisa, separating them and threatens to hurt Paloma to have Estela obey his orders.
38	"Estela se gana el odio de la gente"	April 5, 2017	June 28, 2017	1.82
Estela begins to suffer the contempt of the people while helping Mr. Blake in his campaign for Riverside's mayor and his remarks against illegal people. But if she does not follow Blake's orders, Palomita will suffer.
39	"El oscuro pasado de Chayo"	April 6, 2017	June 29, 2017	1.40
Idalia lies to Mercy about Chayo's terrible past. However, when Mercy tries to judge Chayo, she tells her true story and Mercy learns of her painful life.
40	"Estela pierde el amor de Paloma"	April 7, 2017	June 30, 2017	1.53
Estela is rejected by Paloma because of the bad influence of Mr. Blake, who has made her believe that her mother is a bad person.
41	"Asdrúbal en manos de Ryan"	April 10, 2017	July 4, 2017	N/A
Ryan manipulates Asdrúbal when asking for the freedom of Estela and Paloma in exchange for the money of Marcelino Salgado.
42	"Ryan logra liberar a Estela y Paloma"	April 11, 2017	July 5, 2017	1.69
After a stormy moment, Estela and Paloma return with Ryan. Despite having Mr. Blake and El Dorado behind them, Ryan and Estela promise to continue fighting together.
43	"La Regia limpia su imagen"	April 12, 2017	July 7, 2017	N/A
Ryan makes a plan for La Regia to return to the stage and say how Mr. Blake forced her to promote his campaign.
44	"Danilo se aprovecha de Estela"	April 13, 2017	July 10, 2017	1.54
Danilo drugs Estela to make her unconscious and take advantage of her. With this act Danilo finally satisfies his desire to have Estela.
45	"El papá de Paloma aparece"	April 14, 2017	July 11, 2017	1.74
The true father of Paloma arrives by orders of Mr. Blake to Furia Productions to demand the custody of his daughter.
46	"Chayo escapa con Paloma"	April 17, 2017	July 12, 2017	1.71
Chayo flees with Paloma to avoid Paloma from being taken. Estela is determined to return to Mexico to hide from everyone.
47	"La mentira de Morgana se viene abajo"	April 18, 2017	July 13, 2017	1.75
Danilo suspects that Morgana is hiding something from him, which is why he sets a trap to take her to the doctor. This is where she confesses that she is not pregnant.
48	"La Toña y Fausto en manos de La Regia"	April 19, 2017	July 14, 2017	1.67
Nina confesses to La Regia that La Toña and Fausto forced her to set her up. That's why Laura decides to do justice on her own.
49	"Laura se entrega a la justicia"	April 20, 2017	July 17, 2017	1.70
Laura decides to do the right thing and surrenders to the police, confessing that she has been usurping another identity for years.
50	"El juicio de Laura"	April 21, 2017	July 18, 2017	1.68
The day of Laura's trial has arrived, Mr. Blake is called to testify against him and tells the terrifying story he lived through it.
51	"Joe busca pruebas para salvar a Laura"	April 24, 2017	July 19, 2017	1.86
Ryan asks Joe to find evidence to prove to the court that Laura was a victim of La Toña, Fausto and Mr. Blake.
52	"Laura es declarada culpable"	April 25, 2017	July 21, 2017	1.36
The trial of Laura Oviedo came to an end and the jury found her guilty for the crimes she committed, including the robbery of the little Palomita.
53	"Luisa ayuda a Laura para hundir a Mr. Blake"	April 26, 2017	July 24, 2017	1.74
Laura learns that Mr. Blake wants to adopt Palomita, that's why she asks Luisa to help uncover that he is a terrible man.
54	"El final de Mr.Blake"	April 27, 2017	July 27, 2017	1.65
Thanks to Luisa's collaboration, Joe gets the evidence that incriminates Mr. Blake. Feeling betrayed and cornered by justice, Blake has no choice but to take his own life.
55	"La Regia regresa con todo"	April 28, 2017	July 27, 2017	1.65
Regia convenes a press conference to clarify the rumors about her stay in jail. In addition to confirming that she returns to the stages without Los Jerarcas and Furia Productions.
56	"Laura está embarazada"	May 1, 2017	July 28, 2017	1.65
Ryan confesses to Laura that the real Estela Carrillo appeared. Meanwhile, Laura doubts about the paternity of her son, thanks to the baseness of Danilo.
57	"Mercy trata de huir con Paloma"	May 2, 2017	July 31, 2017	1.62
Mercy tries to flee away with Paloma to prevent Laura from taking her away and lose a daughter as in the past.
58	"Laura y Ryan se casan"	May 3, 2017	July 31, 2017	1.45
Ryan surprises Laura and declares his love to the law, promising her a pure and sincere love.
59	"Ryan salva a Estela"	May 4, 2017	August 1, 2017	1.65
Ryan and Laura look for clues to find Estela, but they inadvertently find Asdrúbal, who apparently tried to prevent Estela from returning with El Dorado.
60	"Morgana atenta contra Laura y su bebé"	May 5, 2017	August 1, 2017	1.32
Laura suspects the sudden change of attitude on the part of Morgana but still accepts to drink a tea that she offers to her. Unfortunately, the cups were changed and Leti suffers the consequences.
61	"Mercy descubre a Ryan con Estela"	May 8, 2017	August 3, 2017	1.74
Estela dares to kiss Ryan knowing that he is married, but Mercy arrives at that precise moment and insults Estela without knowing who she is.
62	"Ryan entre la espada y la pared ¿Laura o Estela?"	May 9, 2017	August 3, 2017	1.51
Ryan decides to drink to forget for a moment the feeling that has arisen now that Estela returned, but Laura makes the decision to stop and asks Ryan to decide between her or Estela.
63	"Danilo, el nuevo dueño de Furia Productions"	May 10, 2017	August 4, 2017	1.57
Steve is threatened by Danilo and orders him to surrender his shares of Furia Productions to make him the majority partner of the company.
64	"Milton es asesinado"	May 11, 2017	August 4, 2017	1.14
Milton gets an interview with Laura to investigate the identity of El Dorado, but his plans turn out badly and before he can reveal the truth, Milton is shot by an unknown person. Laura later discovers a note that asks, "Which is the best place to hide".
65	"Laura sospecha que Estela es "El Dorado""	May 12, 2017	August 8, 2017	1.53
Estela Carrillo reappears in the event of Horacio Palencia and steals all eyes. After hearing Horacio ask a question similar to the one on the note, Laura comes to terms that Estela is "El Dorado".
66	"Estela hace trato con Danilo"	May 15, 2017	August 9, 2017	1.55
Estela introduces herself as El Dorado before Danilo and asks him to get Ryan out of the dirty business in Furia. In return he will be able to keep all the money from Marcelino Salgado.
67	"Asdrúbal sale de la cárcel y busca a Estela"	May 16, 2017	August 10, 2017	1.70
Asdrúbal manages to escape from prison and finds Estela to prove that she is still the only woman in his life.
68	"El Sagrado quiere a Morgana"	May 17, 2017	August 14, 2017	1.66
El Sagrado gets Morgana to have a great performance and complete her show. But in return he asks Danilo to have Morgana.
69	"Danilo mata a Asdrúbal"	May 18, 2017	August 15, 2017	1.63
Estela gives a gun to Asdrúbal so he can use it against Danilo. What he never imagined was that he would be betrayed, since the weapon was defective and Danilo took advantage to finish his life.
70	"Ryan descubre las mentiras de Estela"	May 19, 2017	August 16, 2017	1.60
Ryan faces Estela to tell her that all this time he faked affection and stayed by her side to find out if she really had a double life.
71	"Gran final"	May 21, 2017	August 17, 2017	1.67
72	"Gran final"	May 21, 2017	August 18, 2017	1.93
Estela confesses her darkest secrets to Laura and reveals to her that she is Mercy's daughter. Finally La Regia manages to win the prize "Estrella Latina", for the best disc of the year in the Mexican regional genre, but her happiness is interrupted by a mysterious presence. Special guest: Livia Brito as Yolanda Cadena, Macarena Achaga as Olivia Nieves and Natasha Domínguez as Amanda Cuadrado, original characters of the series La Piloto.

== Webisodes ==
=== Keep Calm Chavalín te ayuda (2017) ===
No.	Title	Original release date	Length (minutes)
1	"Keep Calm Chavalín te ayuda"	February 1, 2017	5:23
Webisodes pilot to give way to the series premiere.
2	"Matrícula consular"	February 10, 2017	3:48
Chavalín teaches you that it is a consular register.
3	"La policía"	February 15, 2017	4:55
Chavalín helps you identify the police and their different roles. Put on trout and listen to these tips that will surely be useful.
4	"Festividades"	February 18, 2017	2.59
United States Holidays are interesting activities. Chavalin helps you to meet them.
5	"Trabajos mejor pagados"	February 23, 2017	3:01
On this occasion Chavalin will help you to find the best job, effortlessly, well remunerated and achieve the American dream.
6	"Solos en la ciudad"	February 27, 2017	3:49
7	"Control de migración en el aeropuerto"	March 6, 2017	2:38
8	"El amor entre fronteras"	March 15, 2017	5:14
9	"Comida rápida"	March 23, 2017	3:15
10	"Trabajos sin documentación"	April 5, 2017	3:21
11	"Amigos"	April 12, 2017	3:13
12	"Sé un experto en coctelería"	April 19, 2017	3:58
13	"Repostería"	April 27, 2017	2:53
14	"Contrato bancario"	May 3, 2017	2:52

=== Chisme sobre rueda (2017) ===
No.	Title	Original release date
1	"Rosy Ocampo revela detalles sobre la doble vida de Estela Carrillo"	February 1, 2017
Producer Rosy Ocampo reveals all the details about her new project La doble vida de Estela Carrillo.
2	"¿Ryan será culpable?"	February 10, 2017
The Cabrera family has many secrets to reveal.
3	"Balacera en la fundación Everwood"	February 13, 2017
Chayo and Agustín tell you that happened with Everwood Foundation.
4	"La fiesta de "El dorado""	February 15, 2017
El Calao has all the details about the festival of El Dorado, where Los Jerarcas de la Sierra de Danilo Cabrera were to set the mood.
5	"Apareció la verdadera Estela Carrillo"	May 8, 2017
Steve narrates the experience that lived Ryan and Laura, when finding the true Estela Carrillo.

=== Cocina de Chayo (2017) ===
No.	Title	Original release date	Length (minutes)
1	"Receta de Cachapas"	February 16, 2017	1:22
In the kitchen of Chayo we present you a simple but delicious recipe. The cachapa is one of the star dishes of Venezuelan and Colombian food.
2	"Panqueques con dulce de leche"	March 2, 2017	01:02
Chayo teaches you to prepare pancakes with dulce de leche.
3	"Pasta a la mexicana"	March 15, 2017	1:16
Chayo teaches you how to prepare Mexican pasta.
4	"Tapitas de camarón"	March 22, 2017	1:49
Chayo teaches you how to prepare tapitas de camarón.
5	"Pizza de sandía"	April 6, 2017	1:14
Chayo teaches you to prepare watermelon pizza with natural ingredients.
6	"Taza desayuno"	April 11, 2017	1:20
Chayo teaches you how to cook a delicious and quick lunch.
7	"Baguette de ensalada de pollo asado"	March 6, 2017	1:33
Chayo teaches you how to prepare roasted chicken salad baguette.

== Awards and nominations ==
Year	Award	Category	Nominated	Result
2018	TVyNovelas Awards	Best Actress	Ariadne Díaz	Nominated
2018	TVyNovelas Awards	Best Actor	David Zepeda	Nominated
2018	TVyNovelas Awards	Best Antagonist Actress	África Zavala	Nominated
2018	TVyNovelas Awards	Best Antagonist Actor	Danilo Carrera	Won
2018	TVyNovelas Awards	Best Leading Actress	Zaide Silvia Gutiérrez	Nominated
2018	TVyNovelas Awards	Best Leading Actor	Alejandro Tomassi	Nominated
2018	TVyNovelas Awards	Best Co-lead Actress	Erika Buenfil	Nominated
2018	TVyNovelas Awards	Best Co-lead Actor	Adrián Di Monte	Nominated
2018	TVyNovelas Awards	Best Supporting Actress	Vanessa Bauche	Nominated
2018	TVyNovelas Awards	Best Supporting Actor	Marco Méndez	Nominated
2018	TVyNovelas Awards	Best Young Lead Actress	Yanni Prado	Nominated
2018	TVyNovelas Awards	Best Young Lead Actor	Álex Perea	Nominated
2018	TVyNovelas Awards	Best Original Story or Adaptation	Claudia Velazco and Pedro Armando Rodríguez	Nominated
2018	TVyNovelas Awards	Best Direction	Benjamín Cann and Rodrigo G. H. Zaunbos	Nominated
2018	TVyNovelas Awards	Best Direction of the Camaras	Manuel Barajas and Alejandro Álvarez	Nominated
2018	TVyNovelas Awards	Best Musical Theme	"Y me pregunto" (Julión Álvarez)	Nominated
2018	TVyNovelas Awards	Best Cast	La doble vida de Estela Carrillo	Nominated
2018	GLAAD Media Award	Outstanding Scripted Television Series (Spanish-Language)	La doble vida de Estela Carrillo	Nominated
