= Ariadne Díaz =

Mexican actress (born 1986)

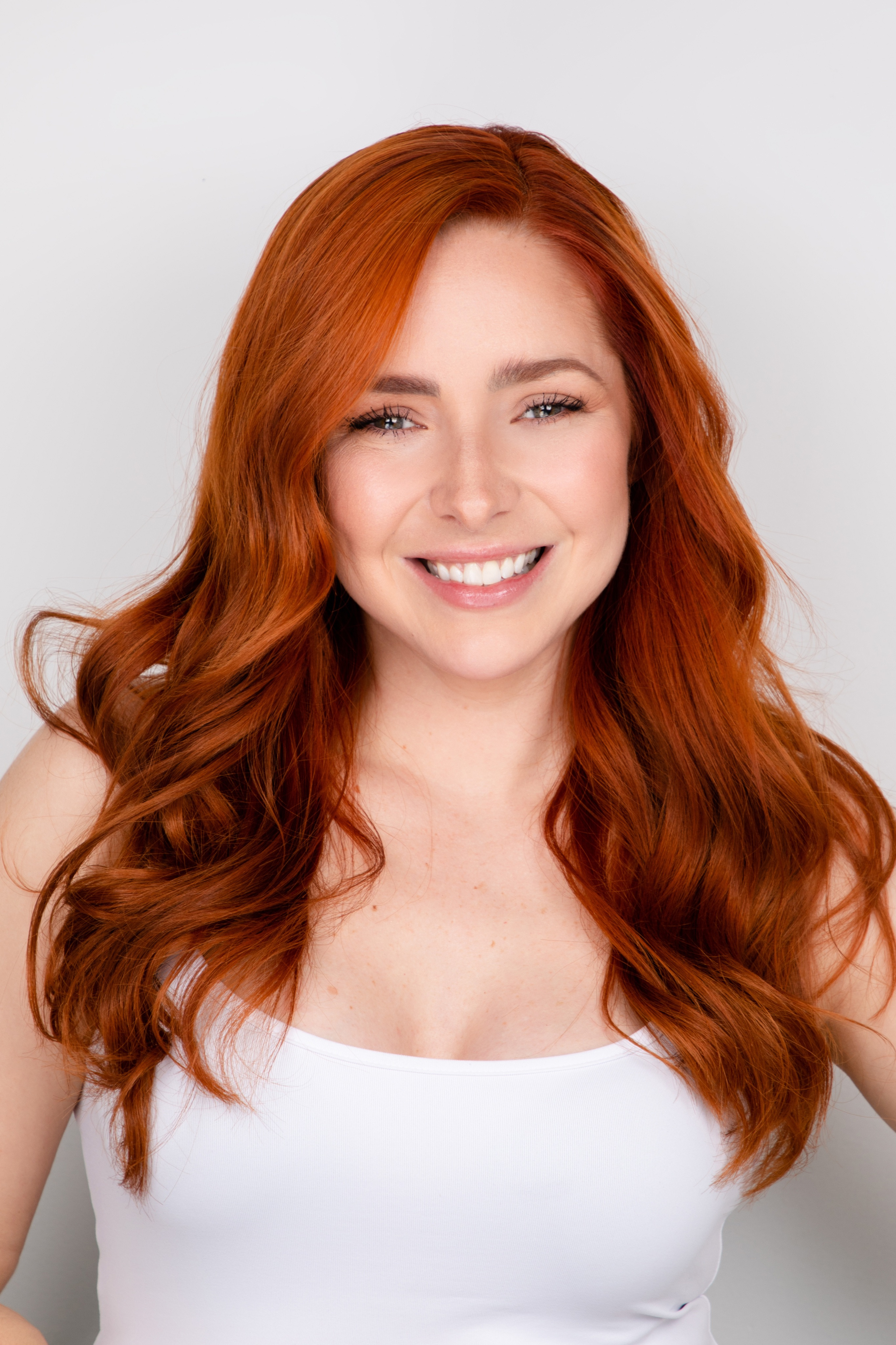
- Ariadne Díaz in 2021
- Born: Ariadne Rosales Díaz; August 16, 1986 (age 40); Guadalajara, Jalisco, Mexico
- Occupations: Actress; former model
- Years active: 2006–present
- Partner: Marcus Ornellas (2015–present)
- Children: 1

Ariadne Díaz (Spanish pronunciation: [aˈɾjaðne ˈði.as]; born Ariadne Rosales Díaz, August 16, 1986, in Guadalajara, Jalisco, Mexico) is a Mexican actress and former model.

== Biography ==
Díaz was born on August 16, 1986, in Guadalajara, Jalisco. She is of Spanish and French descent. In 2006, she made her television debut on RBD: La Familia in the episode titled "El Que Quiera Azul Celeste... Que Se Acueste!". In 2007, she starred in the telenovela Muchachitas como tú, playing the role of Leticia Hernández. Díaz was also cast in the dual co-protagonist/antagonist role of Florencia Echevarria de Belmonte in Al diablo con los guapos.

She also played the daughter of the villain "Barbara Greco" in Mañana Es Para Siempre. In 2010, Díaz was given her first starring role portraying a chubby, charismatic girl Marianela Ruiz y de Teresa Pavon in Llena de Amor. In June 2012, she starred in Prince Royce's music video, "Incondicional" from his album Phase II.

In August 2013, she returned to Televisa where she was given her second starring role portraying Marcela Morales, in La mujer del Vendaval. In 2013, she played Pesados's love interest in their song's video "Cuando estas de buenas." In 2013, Diaz returned to theatre playing Yolanda in the musical Perfume de Gardenia. In 2014 she played a special appearance as "Adriana Murillo de Gaxiola" mother of Esmeralda Pimentel in El Color de la Pasión. That same year Diaz played the protagonist in La Malquerida as the daughter of Victoria Ruffo's character, alongside Christian Meier and Mane de la Parra.

On November 9, 2016, Díaz was confirmed as the protagonist of Rosy Ocampo's telenovela La doble vida de Estela Carrillo, a series based on true events, in which she stars opposite David Zepeda.

== Filmography ==
=== Film ===
Year	Title	Role	Notes
2013	3:6 Until Sunrise	The Woman	Short film
2015	Flor Silvestre: Su destino fue querer	Herself	Documentary short
2016	Te juro que yo no fui	Mónica	
2024	El roomie	Silvia	

=== Television roles ===
Year	Title	Role	Notes
2006	Energía extrema Sonric's	Ari	26 episodes
2007	RBD: La familia	Unknown role	Episode: "El que quiera azul celeste, que se acueste"
2007	Muchachitas como tú	Leticia Hernández Fernández	Main role
2007-2008	Al diablo con los guapos	Florencia Echavarría	Recurring role
2008-2009	Mañana es para siempre	Aurora	Recurring role; 141 episodes
2010-2011	Llena de amor	Marianela Ruiz y de Teresa Pavón	Main role
2012-2013	La mujer del Vendaval	Marcela Morales	Main role; 167 episodes
2014	El color de la pasión	Adriana Murillo	5 episodes
2014	La malquerida	Acacia Rivas Maldonado	Main role; 116 episodes
2017	La doble vida de Estela Carrillo	Estela Carrillo	Main role; 72 episodes
2018	Tenías que ser tú	Marisa Santiesteban	Main role; 87 episodes
2022	Mi tío	Sam	Main role
2022	Vencer la ausencia	Julia	Main role
2023	Más allá de ti	Amy	Main role
2024-2026	Papás por conveniencia	Aidé	Main role

== Awards and nominations ==
=== People en Español ===
Year	Category	Telenovela	Result
2009	Best Young Actress	Mañana es para siempre	Nominated

=== Premios TVyNovelas ===
Year	Category	Telenovela	Result
2014	The Most Beautiful Girl	La mujer del Vendaval	Won
2014	Favorite Couple with José Ron	La mujer del Vendaval	Nominated
2014	Favorite Slap in José Ron	La mujer del Vendaval	Nominated
2015	Best Lead Actress	La malquerida	Nominated
2018	Best Lead Actress	La doble vida de Estela Carrillo	Nominated
2019	Best Lead Actress	Tenías que ser tú	Eliminated

=== Premios Juventud ===
Year	Category	Telenovela	Result
2014	Chica que me quita el sueño	La mujer del Vendaval	Nominated
