= Más allá de ti =

- Genre: Crime thriller
- Created by: Claudia Velasco; Pedro Armando Rodríguez
- Written by: Henry Bedwell; Carmen Pombero
- Directed by: Benjamín Cann; Francisco Franco
- Starring: Ariadne Díaz; Sebastián Rulli; Lisa Owen; Dominika Paleta; Patricia Reyes Spíndola; Arturo Ríos
- Composer: Alejandro Abaroa
- Country of origin: Mexico
- Original language: Spanish
- No. of seasons: 1
- No. of episodes: 8

Production
- Executive producers: Vincenzo Gratteri; Rosy Ocampo
- Producers: Raúl Estrada; Daniel Estrada
- Editors: Rigel Sosa; Fernando Rodríguez
- Camera setup: Multi-camera
- Production company: TelevisaUnivision

Original release
- Network: Vix
- Release: 26 May 2023

Más allá de ti is a Mexican crime thriller streaming television miniseries produced by Rosy Ocampo for TelevisaUnivision. It stars Sebastián Rulli, Ariadne Díaz, Lisa Owen and Dominika Paleta. The series premiered on Vix on 26 May 2023.

== Cast ==
=== Main ===
- Ariadne Díaz as Amy Rodríguez
- Sebastián Rulli as David Salgado
- Lisa Owen
- Dominika Paleta as Caroline
- Patricia Reyes Spíndola
- Arturo Ríos

=== Recurring and guest stars ===
- María Perroni as Samantha Lucas
- Emilio Beltrán as Matt Harris
- Gustavo Sánchez Parra as Efrén Hinojosa "El Pollero"
- Ari Brickman as Nolan Turner
- Salvador Sánchez as Crisanto Pescador
- Nacho Tahhan as James Harris
- Antonio Fortier as Larry Villegas
- Pedro de Tavira as Alan Walton
- Juan Carlos Beyer as Sheriff Longoria
- Jacobo Lieberman as Ethan Howard
- Artús Chávez as Oliver Barnes
- Mikael Lacko as Walter Clayton
- Virgilio Delgado as Milton Alvino
- Pilar Padilla as Dolores Flores de Alvino
- Azalia Ortiz as Guillermina Larios
- Angélica Lara as Tía Gloria
- Paulina Treviño as Lauren
- Víctor Weinstock as George Sosa
- Vitter Leija as Willy
- Adrián Aguirre as Roger Núñez
- Manuel Gorka as Dr. Resnik
- Anna Silvetti

== Production ==
On 16 February 2022, the series was announced as one of the titles for TelevisaUnivision's streaming platform Vix. Filming began on 27 October 2022. Production took place in Mexico City and Baja California. The series premiered on 26 May 2023.

== Episodes ==
No.	Title	Original release date
1	"Un regalo del más allá"	26 May 2023
2	"Susurros de la muerte"	26 May 2023
3	"Cada día puede ser el último"	26 May 2023
4	"La verdad no muere"	26 May 2023
5	"Te llamo desde el abismo"	26 May 2023
6	"Prefiero morir, mamá"	26 May 2023
7	"Diles que él fue…"	26 May 2023
8	"La vida y la muerte son buenas amigas"	26 May 2023
