= Fabiola Rodas =

Guatemalan singer songwriter (born 1992)

Fabiola Roudha
- Born: Jackeline Fabiola Rodas Valladares / Fabiola Roudha; September 6, 1992 (age 33)
- Origin: Guatemala City, Guatemala
- Genres: Soul, Pop
- Instruments: Voice, keyboard
- Years active: 2004-present

Jackeline Fabiola Rodas Valladares, also known as Fabiola Roudha (born September 6, 1992), is a Guatemalan singer and songwriter who gained international attention by coming in third place on the reality show Codigo Fama Internacional. Several years later, in 2008, she was the runner-up in La Academia--Última Generación. In 2009, she was crowned the winner of El Gran Desafío de Estrellas.

From a young age, she demonstrated an aptitude for the performing arts, exhibiting interest in singing, dancing, and music. She speaks Spanish, English, and Italian. After she ended her contract with TV Azteca in 2011, she started creating her own musical concept. She wrote songs and released her project as "Fabiola Roudha".

In 2015, she released her first album, Esta soy yo, and her first single "Nada más que este blues" ("You left me nothing but blues"). This blues and pop-style single became a great success in México and Guatemala, so she released her second single "Dame tu amor" ("A little bit of love"), a song that fused soul and pop styles.

By July 2017, she had written new songs, and she started recording her second album, Más Allá, in October 2017. Más Allá includes seven songs (in Spanish), with soul, blues, funk, and pop influences.

Más Allá was released on July 25, 2018, in Guatemala, having a special guest, the Mexican producer, singer, and songwriter Aleks Syntek.

In support of her album Más Allá, Roudha embarked on a four-city Guatemalan tour, performing in Guatemala City, Antigua Guatemala, Sololá, and Quetzaltenango.

In 2018, Fabiola Roudha released "El amor no engaña" as the lead single from her album Más Allá. The song was promoted in Mexico, Guatemala, and later in Italy.

In 2019, Roudha promoted "Fuera del cristal," the second single from her album Más Allá, in Mexico, Guatemala, and the United States.

== Accolades ==
2001

Won first place in a contest organized by The Teletón in Guatemala

2002

Opened the first concert of Belinda in Guatemala

As a child, was declared artist of the year

2003

Opened a concert for the first generation of La Academia of TV Azteca

Opened a concert by the duo Pimpinela

Opened a concert for Pandora

Opened a concert for Angélica Vale

2004

Opened a concert in Guatemala for Eros Ramazzotti in his tour Eros9

Opened a concert for Alberto Cortez

Represented Guatemala in the "World Championships of Performing Arts" and won 7 gold medals and top 5 awards in 7 categories, such as Music Genres: R & B, Pop, Rock, Latin, Dance and Vocal Broadway.

2005

Opened two concerts for Vicente Fernández

Participated in Codigo Fama Internacional Televisa Mexico, where she earned third place

Launched her first concert, in which she invited some of her friends from Codigo Fama Internacional and Zapping Zone, after returning from her participation in Codigo Fama Internacional Televisa Mexico

Invited by Marcelo Tinelli from Argentina to participate in ShowMatch for a period of three months. The Argentine public showed their admiration, support and sympathy to Fabiola, becoming the first Guatemalan girl recognized and loved in Argentina. Moreover, at each occurrence of Fabiola in ShowMatch, the rating rose very significantly.

2006

Invited to the events of arroba gold in Los Angeles, Panama, Dominican Republic, El Salvador, and Guatemala.

Received and accepted an invitation to ShowMatch, on which she was awarded first place. In this occasion, the rating left a lot to talk about because of raising more than 32 points in each share, beating all the local competition, even better ratings above, where there were presentations by artists such as Ricky Martin, Chayanne, etc.

2008

Had several appearances in Guatemala and won second place in the last generation of La Academia

2009

On January 10, held a concert in Guatemala at La Academia in thanks to her Guatemalan supporters.

On July 26, crowned the winner of Desafio de Estrellas#El Gran Desafío de Estrellas.

2024

On September 10, 2024, interpreted an amazing rendition of the United States National Anthem at the iconic Los Angeles Dodgers Stadium.

== Inside La Academia ==
La Academia was a reality show for singers 16 to 25 years old. Inside the house, students were taught singing, dancing, acting, and many different activities. The show was held over a four-month period. Each Sunday, a concert was held, and students were eliminated one by one. Inside La Academia, Fabiola felt very insecure. However, she was well received by critics in the majority of the concerts. Over the period of the show, Fabiola proved that she was a great performer and singer, and she made it to the finale, where she was runner-up to Maria Fernanda. Fabiola received many tasks during La Academia that took her out of her comfort zone, requiring her to perform in genres that were new to her.

- "Fabiola Adentro de la Academia". TV Azteca. Archived from the original on 2008-12-28.

=== Elimination chart ===
Legend
| Female | Male | Top 20 | Top 24 |

Eliminated

| Stage: | | Semi-Finals | Finals | | | | | | | | | | | | | Grand Finale |
| Week: | | 08/31^{1} | 09/07 | 09/14 | 09/21 | 09/28 | 10/05 | 10/12 | 10/19 | 10/26 | 11/02 | 11/09 | 11/16 | 11/23 | 11/30 | 12/14 |
| Place | Contestant | Result | | | | | | | | | | | | | | |
| 1 | Maria Fernanda | | | | | | | | | | | | | | | Winner |
| 2 | Fabiola Rodas | | | | | | | | | | | | | | | Runner-Up |
| 3 | Luis Armando Lozano | | | | | | | | | | | | | | | 3rd Place |
| 4 | Valeria Dessens | | | | | | | | | | | | | | | 4th Place |
| 5 | Perla Estrada | | | | | | | | | | | | | | | 5th place |
| 6 | Alex Garza | | | | | | | | | | | | | | | Elim |
| 7 | Jacqueline González | | | | | | | | | | | | | | Elim | |
| 8 | Matías Aranda | | | | | | | | | | | | | Elim | | |
| 9 | Wilfredo Pineda | | | | | | | | | | | | | Elim | | |
| 10 | Estebán Velázquez | | | | | | | | | | | | Elim | | | |
| 11 | Cinthia Urtiaga | | | | | | | | | | | Elim | | | | |
| 12 | Iván Estrada | | | | | | | | | | Elim | | | | | |
| 13-16 | Fátima Molina | | | | | | | | | Elim | | | | | | |
| 13-16 | Héctor Silva | | | | | | | | Elim | | | | | | | |
| 13-16 | Alba Alcudia | | | | | | | Elim | | | | | | | | |
| 13-16 | Gerardo Castillo | | | | | | Elim | | | | | | | | | |
| 17-20 | Monserrat Monroy | | | | | Elim | | | | | | | | | | |
| 17-20 | Dazahev López | | | | Elim | | | | | | | | | | | |
| 17-20 | Alejandra Sandoval | | | Elim | | | | | | | | | | | | |
| 17-20 | José Roberto Carrillo | | Elim | | | | | | | | | | | | | |
| 21-24 | Sergio Castro | Elim | | | | | | | | | | | | | | |
| 21-24 | Manuel Murillo | Elim | | | | | | | | | | | | | | |
| 21-24 | Erik Uziel Salinas | Elim | | | | | | | | | | | | | | |
| 21-24 | Flor de María | Elim | | | | | | | | | | | | | | |

^{1}Lyanne Rebeca García Parra was EXPELLED before Concert 1.

== Performances in La Academia ==
Concert 1: Las de la Intuicion - Shakira

Concert 2: Volvere - Jesse & Joy

Concert 3: Luz Sin Gravedad - Belinda

Concert 4: Viveme - Laura Pausini

Concert 5: Daria - La Quinta Estación

Concert 6: El Amor Coloca - Mónica Naranjo

Concert 7: Quien Eres Tu -Yuri

Concert 8: Se Como Duele - Karina

Concert 9: Lo siento - Belinda

Concert 10:Tocando Fondo - Kalimba

Concert 11:Como Olvidar - Olga Tañón

Concert 12:Tristes Recuerdos - Pepe Aguilar

Concert 13:Cuando Baja La Marea - Yuri

Concert 14:Yo pa' ti no Estoy - Rosanna

Concert 15:Por Cobardia - Lila Deneken

Concert 15:Ven conmigo - Christina Aguilera

FINALE 1 SONG: Regresa A Mi - Toni Braxton

FINALE 2 SONG: Como Olvidar - Olga Tañón

== Performances in El Gran Desafio ==
Concert 7: Otro Amor Vendra - Lara Fabian

Concert 8: Un Poco de Amor - Queen

Concert 9: Mi Alma Te Seguira - Celine Dion

Concert 10:Angel - Robbie Williams

Concert 11:Quien Eres Tu - Yuri

Concert 12:Without You/Sin Ti - Harry Nilsson

Concert 13:Fame - Irene Cara

La Cigarra - Lola Beltrán

I Will Always Love You - Whitney Houston

Concert 14: The Power of Love - Celine Dion

No Te Quiero Nada - Ha*Ash

Te Conozco Bien - Marc Anthony

Por Ti Volare - Andrea Bocelli

== Discography ==
In early 2010, TV Azteca released Fabiola's first album Mi gran desafio with 2 original songs, 1 Telenovela theme and 7 covers.

In 2015, she released her first album Esta Soy Yo as an independent artist. An album with Blues, Soul, pop and Poprock.

=== Más Allá ===
In 2015, she released her second album Más Allá as an independent artist. An album with Blues, Soul, Pop, Funk and Ballad in Spanish.
