= Papás por conveniencia =

- Genre: Telenovela
- Created by: Pedro Armando Rodríguez; Gerardo Pérez Zermeño
- Written by: Alejandra Romero; Humberto Robles; Luis Gamboa; Daniela Ochoa
- Directed by: Benjamín Cann; Fernando Nesme
- Starring: Ariadne Díaz; José Ron; Ferdinando Valencia; África Zavala; Daniela Luján; Martín Ricca; María Chacón; Miguel Martínez; Horacio Pancheri; Lambda García; Sherlyn; Imanol Landeta
- Theme music composer: Jesse Huerta; Joy Huerta; Tommy Torres
- Opening theme: "Digas lo que digas" by Jesse & Joy
- Composer: Alejandro Abaroa
- Country of origin: Mexico
- Original language: Spanish
- No. of seasons: 1
- No. of episodes: 162

Production
- Executive producer: Rosy Ocampo
- Producers: Daniel Estrada; Raúl Estrada
- Editors: Pablo Peralta; Rodrigo Morales
- Camera setup: Multi-camera
- Production company: TelevisaUnivision

Original release
- Network: Las Estrellas
- Release: 21 October 2024 – 1 February 2026

Papás por conveniencia (English title: Conveniently a Family) is a Mexican telenovela produced by Rosy Ocampo for TelevisaUnivision. It stars an ensemble cast led by Ariadne Díaz and José Ron. The first season aired on Las Estrellas from 21 October 2024 to 9 February 2025. A second season of the telenovela, titled Papás por siempre, aired from 13 October 2025 to 1 February 2026.

== Plot ==
Tino Guevara is going through difficult times, struggling with unemployment, mounting debts and the full-time responsibility of caring for his mother and two children. He runs into Guzmán Muriel, the now successful executive of Aidé Mosqueda, owner of an important online sales company, both of whom are former high school classmates of Tino. Tino is invited to a school reunion, and to avoid feeling overshadowed by the achievements of his former classmates, he convinces them that he met all the criteria for a successful adult.

However, the biggest surprise comes when Aidé, the formerly shy nerd who was bullied, reveals that Tino is the father of her rebellious teenage twins, the result of the night they spent together following the graduation party. Despite his disbelief, Tino sees this as an opportunity to fix his financial problems at home and takes on the new parental responsibility by working at Aidé's company. When Tino and his family move in with Aidé in an attempt to integrate into their new life, the household becomes a battleground as their children have trouble adjusting, and to make matters worse, a torrid romance begins to develop between Tino and Aidé, who at first only agreed to act as co-parents.

Thanks to the same school reunion, friends who share a past with Tino and Aidé also end up working in her company. They are: Clara Luz, a talented musician who works as a security guard at concerts, Rudolf: a former child star who now sings his only hit in a bar; and Chano and Lichita, high school sweethearts who got pregnant in high school and now have three children; despite their daily arguments, they want to achieve the goals that were left on the back burner when they had their first child.

Just as Tino begins to find his footing, two obstacles appear: Facundo, Aidé's ex-husband, who seeks to regain the luxurious life he lost after the divorce, and Guzmán himself, who, behind a friendly facade, plans to swindle Aidé. Tino discovers Guzmán's intentions, but is trapped in blackmail when Guzmán threatens with revealing a painful truth to Aidé. Tino is faced with the choice of keeping quiet and allowing Guzmán to continue with his plans or revealing the truth but risking his newly reconstituted family.

== Cast ==
=== Main ===
- Ariadne Díaz as Aidé Mosqueda
- José Ron as Tino Guevara
- Ferdinando Valencia as Guzmán Muriel
- África Zavala as Federica
- Daniela Luján as Clara Luz
- Martín Ricca as Rudolf
- María Chacón as Lichita Chagoyan
- Miguel Martínez as Chano
- Horacio Pancheri as Dámaso Rivera
- Lambda García as Facundo
- Sherlyn as Silvana
- Leticia Perdigón as Bertha
- Cecilia Gabriela as Pura
- María Perroni as Chofis Chamorro Chagoyan
- Joaquín Bondoni as Checo Chamorro Chagoyan
- Jonathan Becerra as El Calacas
- Victoria Viera as Circe
- Emilio Beltrán as Ulises
- Camila Núñez as Scarlet
- Tania Nicole as Lila
- Juan Pablo Velasco as Emiliano
- Constantino Alonso as Pipe
- Mateo Saavedra as Chuchito Chamorro Chagoyan
- Sandra Sánchez Cantú as Rina
- Eduardo Zayas as Augusto
- José Remis as Igor
- Diego Enríquez as Chintolo
- Zury Shasho as Mateo
- Adriana Fonseca as Paulina
- Imanol Landeta as Felipe
- Lukas Urkijo as Oliver
- Ernesto Laguardia as Jason
- Roxana Puente as Ana
- Iván Caraza
- Natalia Álvarez as Yeni
- Paulina Treviño as Rosalinda Cantú
- Pía Sanz as Damaris

=== Guest stars ===
- Daniela Aedo as herself
- Fabián Chávez as himself
- Naydelin Navarrete as herself
- Haydeé Navarra
- Ricardo Barona
- Andrés Giardello
- Odemaris Ruiz
- Yurem Rojas
- Ramiro Torres
- Martha Sabrina

== Production ==
=== Development ===
In December 2023, it was reported that Rosy Ocampo had started pre-production on her next telenovela and that it would be unrelated to the Vencer franchise, which Ocampo had produced from 2020 to 2023. On 26 February 2024, Ocampo announced that the title of the telenovela would be Papás por conveniencia. Filming began on 24 April 2024 and concluded on 11 September 2024. On 4 February 2025, Rosy Ocampo announced that Papás por conveniencia was renewed for a second season, with José Ron and Ariadne Díaz reprising their roles. On 19 March 2025, Ocampo announced Papás por siempre as the title of the season and confirmed it would be the final season.

=== Casting ===
On 28 February 2024, José Ron and Ariadne Díaz were announced in the lead roles. On 8 March 2024, Ernesto Laguardia, Daniela Luján, Martín Ricca, María Chacón, Miguel Martínez and Jonathan Becerra joined the cast. On 18 March 2024, África Zavala and Ferdinando Valencia were announced as the antagonists of the plot.

== Episodes ==
No.	Title	Original release date	Mexico viewers (millions)
1	"¡Aidé te adoraba!"	21 October 2024 (Note: Premiered early online through Las Estrellas website on 18 October 2024.)	2.74
Tino arrives at his son's school to celebrate his birthday; however, the child is in severe pain and has to be rushed to the hospital. Aidé's daughter Circe is suspended from school for bribing the teachers and activating the fire alarm to miss her exam, she confesses that it was Facundo who gave her the idea and the money to bribe the teachers. Tino arrives at his high school reunion with the intention of finding a stable job in order to help his family and is reunited with Clara Luz, Rudolf, Guzmán, Chano, Lichita and Silvana. During the reunion, Aidé is recognized for the great work she has done in her company, Tino doesn't hesitate to admire her, but she suffers a slight dizziness that puts her in danger, but Tino saves her from falling.
2	"¿Quién es nuestro padre biológico?"	22 October 2024	2.82
Aidé is upset with Facundo because he didn't realize that Circe left the house and put her life in danger, and when she goes up to her bedroom she finds another woman's underwear. Federica reveals to Circe that her cousin Aidé was very wild during high school and the reason she has never talked about the father of her children is because she doesn't even know his name. Circe and Ulises barge into their mother's business meeting to demand that she reveal the identity of their biological father, Aidé responds angrily as it is neither the place nor the time to ask something so private. Tino asks Calacas for help to find work, but the thug uses him as an accomplice in the robbery of a jewelry store; however, Tino reveals the robbery plans to the jewelry store employees and ends up arrested with Calacas. Aidé finds a pill on the floor of Circe's room and asks her to give her the others, but when she looks for them she can't find them, so they go to Ulises' room where they find him passed out.
3	"Tino, mis mellizos también son tus hijos"	23 October 2024	2.85
Tino manages to get into Aidé's bedroom and finds a notebook with hearts with his name on them as well as thoughts addressed to him. Lichita warns Chano that she is determined to look for another job because she is tired of not having enough money and she wants to feel useful as a woman, but he forbids her to do so because she cannot neglect the house or the children. Circe manages to talk to her brother, but he asks her not to let his mother in as he doesn't want to see her, the therapist advises Aidé to give him his time as her son is very vulnerable. Aidé opens her heart to Tino and confesses that their destinies were linked before, since her twins, Circe and Ulises, are also his children.
4	"Quiero que seas el niñero de mis hijos"	24 October 2024	2.65
Aidé remembers what happened the night of her graduation and confesses to Tino that she is sure he is the father of her twins since he was the first man in her life, he wants to know more about his children. Clara Luz and Rudolf cannot believe that Silvana has left them the responsibility of taking care of her son Pipe, knowing that it is not in their plans to be parents. Aidé begins to investigate about Tino and discovers that he has economic problems, besides all the information that is in his resume is false. Tino is grateful to Aidé for having paid for Emiliano's surgery, she assures him that she doesn't want him to pay her back, much less work for her company, what she really wants is for him to become the nanny of the twins.
5	"Él es su nuevo tutor"	25 October 2024	2.59
Tino tells Aidé the story of his children and confesses that he is capable of anything for them, she assures him that he speaks very nicely, but she cannot trust him. Circe, upon learning her mother's story with her biological father, prefers not to know anything about him since she believes he only took advantage of her mother because of the condition she was in on the day of her graduation. Aidé introduces Tino as Circe and Ulises' new tutor, they assure her that she is only looking for people to take over her responsibilities as a mother. Melitón is tired of Tino not paying back the money he lent him and threatens to harm his son if he does not pay off the debt as soon as possible.
6	"Tino es el padre biológico de tus sobrinos"	28 October 2024	N/A
Bertha is reluctant to spend the night in the hospital after they become homeless again, Aidé overhears the conversation and discovers that Tino is in big trouble. Aidé offers Tino to live with his family in the service area of her house, Lila asks her father to stop lying and tell Emiliano what is really going on. Circe notices that there is a young girl hanging around the garden of her house, Rina explains that she is Lila the daughter of her new tutor and it is likely that they will see her very often on the property since she has just moved in with her father. Federica begins to investigate about Tino and Guzmán reveals to her that besides being Circe and Ulises' tutor, he is also their biological father.
7	"¡Yo te he dado un buen ejemplo!"	29 October 2024	2.70
Aidé confronts Logroño for minimizing her capacity as a businesswoman and asks him to respect all women, Tino congratulates her for giving herself the place she deserves. Facundo reminds Aidé that he sacrificed his career for her love, she doesn't fall for his blackmail and assures him that he resigned from his program because of the low ratings. Tino, realizing that Ulises is in danger, runs to him and prevents him from jumping into the void, Ulises assures him that he did not plan to hurt himself, he simply did not want to enter his therapy with the psychiatrist. Lichita gets a job at Maxiclick and apologizes to Aide, who is unaware that she will be working for the company, for bullying her in high school. Circe assures her mother that she has not set a good example, since she got involved with a man when she was not conscious, Aidé slaps her for insulting her.
8	"¡Tino es nuestro papá!"	30 October 2024	2.32
Aidé contacts Tino to tell him that she had a confrontation with Circe, he tries to comfort her with his words and she thanks him for his advice and recognizes that having him in her life is very good for her. Aidé refuses to let Facundo be the image of Maxiclick as Logroño proposed, but he assures her that if she continues with the idea of removing him from the house, she will regret it. Aidé assures Circe that knowing her truth does not give her the right to use it against her and hopes not to have another confrontation with her and asks for her forgiveness. Aidé reveals to Circe and Ulises that after meeting Tino again and seeing that he is a great dad, she decided to confess to him the secret she has kept for 17 years, they confirm that their tutor is their father.
9	"¡Aidé eres una gran mujer!"	31 October 2024	2.16
Circe assures Ulises that she won't allow Tino to interfere in her life, much less her family. Lila learns that Circe and Ulises are her half-siblings, and she can't understand why her father prefers to take care of Emiliano's emotional side and not hers. Circe refuses to let Tino's family live in her house, Bertha confronts her and assures her that she needs more education. Tino makes evident the admiration he feels for Aidé and assures her that she is a great woman, she kisses him.
10	"¿Ustedes son mis hermanos?"	1 November 2024	1.90
Clara Luz and Rudolf ask Guzmán not to say anything to Aunt Pura about what happened with Pipe, he pleads with them to pay more attention to his nephew. Tino gets tired of listening to Circe's insults towards him and warns her that he won't allow her to step over his dignity. Aidé asks all her family to receive Emiliano with much empathy, since he has a conduction that requires special care, and when he meets his siblings, he is filled with happiness. Aidé discovers that Lichita is working at Maxiclick and remembers the day she was humiliated by her in front of everyone at school and, as she thinks she will betray her, she puts Lichita to the test by ordering her to organize boxes full of output orders. Emiliano finds Federica and Facundo kissing and when he tries to escape he falls into the pool of the house.
11	"Ustedes no son bienvenidos"	4 November 2024	2.43
Federica jumps into the pool to save Emiliano, Tino and Aidé thank her for saving his life. Checo arrives at Circe's school under the excuse that he is looking for a school, she apologizes for how her mother treated him. Aidé complains to Tino for organizing an event without her permission at Maxiclick, he assures her that he did a market analysis and found an opportunity for growth in a specific segment of the population that likes music and entertainment. Tino informs Aidé that Clara Luz and Rudolf will be part of his work team, she rejects that her former high school classmates get involved with Maxiclick.
12	"Me preocupa Emiliano"	5 November 2024	2.36
Federica tells Circe that she suspects that there is a relationship between Aidé and Tino, since their displays of affection are not those of friends. Scarlet shows Emiliano a picture of her father, which confirms that Federica was kissing Facundo the day of his accident. El Calacas knows that Tino's weak point is his son Emiliano, so he is willing to kidnap him so that Aidé will be the one to pay the ransom. Federica takes Emiliano to the park with the intention of buying him an ice cream, but in reality she does it to warn him not to say anything about the kiss he saw.
13	"¿En qué estás metido?"	6 November 2024	N/A
El Calacas makes Tino believe that he has Emiliano in his power, so he asks him not to talk to the police and later he will give him certain indications. Aidé and Tino fear the worst when they learn that their children are in the hands of El Calacas, but in reality he is only extending the time to find the children and collect the ransom. Scarlett and Emiliano get lost in the park. Tino sees Calacas again and confronts him to get his son back. Clara Luz finds Emiliano. Aidé tells Tino that the situation they experienced with Calacas makes her reconsider whether his presence is indispensable in her life and that of her children or whether he is really putting them in danger.
14	"¿Y si el cómplice es el novio de Circe?"	7 November 2024	2.40
Tino decides that the best thing for Aidé and her family is for him to leave the house so as not to put them in danger. Facundo assures Emiliano that Augusto cannot take him to school since he is only in charge of taking care of the members of the house but not of outsiders. Federica suggests to Aidé that in order to reach an economic agreement with Facundo she should give him a job at Maxiclick, so that she complies with him and it is very likely that he will resign because he is not used to responsibilities. Tino fears that one of Calacas' henchmen is Checo, Circe's boyfriend.
15	"¿Checo es tu hijo?"	8 November 2024	2.37
Clara Luz and Rudolf find some tests where it is confirmed that Pura has pancreatic cancer, they also see her passport and realize that she has another identity. Tino invites all his children to spend a day in Ajusco, Circe opposes to spend the day with her father and siblings because she thinks it is of very low class to go to that place. Tino asks Checo about where he bought his motorcycle, he assures him that he bought it in Polanco; however, Tino comments that they don't sell that brand in that area. Seeing that Circe is not at home, Tino goes in search of Checo and discovers that he is the son of Chano and Lichita. Circe and Checo are about to live a tragedy, after he invades the opposite lane with his motorcycle and runs into a truck. Checo and Circe are about to face an accident, after he invades the oncoming lane with his motorcycle and runs into a truck.
16	"Queremos destituir a Aidé Mosqueda como presidenta"	11 November 2024	2.32
Tino warns Chano to keep an eye on his son, as he is associating with dangerous people and reveals that a few days ago this gang tried to kidnap his son Emiliano. Tino and Chano arrive for their children at the police station and when they see them, Checo introduces his father as the gardener of his house so that Circe does not discover his lie. Circe thanks Tino for saving her and now he will keep her secret, he assures her that she will always be his responsibility and will be with her through thick and thin. Clara Luz is determined to find out if Rudolf is Pipe's biological father, but in doing so they end up kissing. Tino arrives by mistake at the office where the meeting will be held and learns that the shareholders of Maxiclick want to remove Aidé as president of the company.
17	"Aidé está entre la vida y la muerte"	12 November 2024	2.54
Facundo demands that Aidé give him the shares of Maxiclick that correspond to him, but she criticizes him for never giving her any money for the expenses of the house and recognizes that she shouldn't have made him part of the company. Aidé asks Lichita for a detailed report of everything that happens in the company and depending on what she finds in that document, she will know if she can trust her. Checo looks for Circe to reveal that his family is involved in organized crime and that is the reason why he hasn't introduced them to her. Chano is arrested for having robbed the owner of the gym, without imagining that Checo was the one who took the money. Facundo reveals to Circe, Ulises and Scarlet that their mother is undergoing heart surgery and details that Tino did not speak the truth because he plans to keep everything if something bad happens to Aidé.
18	"Vayamos con el corazón en la mano"	13 November 2024	2.38
Tino explains to Circe, Ulises and Scarlet that their mother underwent a surgery that is not life-threatening, so Facundo's plan falls apart. Rudolf reassures Pura that leaving Pipe to him and Clara Luz is a big package that doesn't belong to them, so she makes them leave her home. Tino denies that he is currently in a romantic relationship with Aidé and tells to Circe that she and Ulises would be the first to find out; however, Circe assures him that she won't accept a relationship. Aidé and Tino decide to give themselves a chance as a couple and they kiss, but are photographed by Facundo.
19	"Somos los papás de Checo"	14 November 2024	2.60
Guzmán contacts Pura with the intention of getting closer to his family, but in reality he has other intentions, but she tells him that he must go to Silvana's house for the reading of her will. Lichita tells Aidé that she has some concerns about her children, but doesn't dare confess to her that Checo is dating Circe. Circe finds the images that Facundo posted on social media and confirms that her mother is in a relationship with Tino. Circe gives herself to Checo because she believes he is the man of her life; however, her love is shattered when she discovers that he is poor. Chano denounces Checo to make him take responsibility for his bad actions.
20	"Vamos a unirnos para separarlos"	15 November 2024	2.07
Tino confesses to Circe that Checo belongs to the gang that tried to kidnap Emiliano and Scarlet, she denies all accusations against him. Federica manages to get Tino to see her dressed sensually, but he offers her an apology for what happened and assures her that he respects her since she is the cousin of the love of his life. Scarlet tells Emiliano that her dad will be sad when he finds out about her mother's relationship with Tino, but he assures her that he won't be, since he is Federica's boyfriend. Lila doesn't want to see her dad with Aidé, so she proposes to Circe to join forces to separate them and the best moment for that to happen is during the presentation of Maxiclick's new projects.
21	"Otra mentira más de inventino"	18 November 2024	2.24
Aidé is sure that Facundo wasn't responsible for the photo of her kissing Tino, so Ulises is asked for help to find the person responsible for the boycott. Upon discovering that his daughters were guilty of the boycott, Tino decides that as punishment Circe will have to share her bedroom with Lila; however, they are already preparing their next plan to separate him and Aidé. Guzmán suggests to Lichita that she should separate from Chano since she will never have a favorable future with him and he remembers how he felt about her 18 years ago. Tino gives Lila the address to visit the church where her mother's ashes are deposited, but when they arrive they discover that the graves have been abandoned since 1970.
22	"Quiero conquistar a tu papi"	19 November 2024	2.24
Guzmán confirms that the employees' anger is more against Aidé, since Tino's charisma is helping him to be liked. Lila continues with the idea of her dad remaining single, so she places a picture of her mom in Aidé's bedroom, she asks Tino to tell her about Paulina. Seeing that Tino is bringing a lot of problems to the company's image, Aidé decides that the best thing to do is to give him compensation for his project and to stop working at Maxiclick. Federica seeks Emiliano to reveal to him that she is in love with Tino, so she wants him to be her accomplice so that she can win him over.
23	"Terminé siendo una perdedora"	20 November 2024	N/A
Aidé lets Clara Luz know that it is not so easy to trust her because of everything she did to her in high school, Clara Luz accepts that she turned out to be the loser. Aidé makes it clear to Lila that she respects Paulina's memory and remembrance, Lila assures her that she did not put her mother's picture in the bedroom. Facundo tries to hurt Aidé and cuts the brakes of her car; however, Ulises is the one who drives it and suffers an accident. Aidé and Tino wish to have some time alone, so he proposes to go out after they have dinner with the family.
24	"Me obligó a algo que no quería"	21 November 2024	2.36
The doctor confirms to Pura that her illness is entering the terminal phase, so she has little time left to live. Ulises arrives at Gina's house to study, but she is ready for something else to happen. Pura confesses to Rudolf that she does not want to spend her last days in the hospital, so she wants to sign her advance directive. Ulises can no longer hide his pain and reveals to Tino that someone sexually abused him, he tells Aidé and they both suffer for their son.
25	"Gracias papá"	22 November 2024	2.38
Aidé believes that it is her fault Ulises was assaulted since she has not been a present mother, Tino tries to calm her down so that they can both help their son. Guzmán proposes to Federica and Facundo to create an atmosphere of discord among the employees of Maxiclick and thus harm Aidé. Circe confirms that it was Lorena who spread Ulises' information on social media and warns her that no one messes with her brother. Ulises makes his presentation individually and takes the opportunity to thank his father for coming back, since he changed his life.
26	"Tino les va a dar su apellido"	25 November 2024	2.43
Tino refuses the shares Aidé plans to give him in Maxiclick, but she asks him to analyze the offer since she is about to pay her partners. Aidé announces to Circe and Ulises that she has decided that from now on they are going to take Tino's last name, Circe objects. Gina apologizes to Ulises and assures him that she never thought Lorena would reveal everything she told her. Lila and Circe have a heated argument and accidentally push Scarlet down the stairs.
27	"Eres el nuevo socio de Aidé"	26 November 2024	2.38
Although Clara Luz and Rudolf beg Guzmán not to inform Pipe that Pura had died, he goes ahead with the news, which causes a lot of pain to his nephew. Lila confesses to Tino that Circe is hurting Emiliano, although she doesn't have proof, she is willing to prove what she says. Guzmán reveals to his assistant that after Pura's death he is willing to get Clara Luz and Rudolf out of his way, but when he has custody of Pipe he plans to send him to a boarding school. Federica comments to Aidé that sometimes she feels that Tino is looking for her under some excuse just to be with her.
28	"¿Por qué le tomó fotos a Fede?"	27 November 2024	2.26
Circe complains to Aidé for having given Maxiclick shares to Tino, Facundo finds out and assures her that those shares belonged to him because he was part of her family. Aidé is tired of the negative attitude Circe has taken against Tino and warns her that if she continues with her disrespect, she is ready to send her to boarding school. Facundo decides to kidnap Scarlet's dog, Poncy, so that his videos will get more views. Aidé checks Tino's cell phone and discovers that he has pictures of Federica.
29	"¿Paulina está viva?"	28 November 2024	N/A
30	"Tino tiene un enemigo en la empresa"	29 November 2024	2.16
31	"Este momento es nuestro"	2 December 2024	N/A
32	"¡Estás de pie!"	3 December 2024	2.65
33	"¡Me das asco!"	4 December 2024	2.63
34	"Voy a pasar con mi papá"	5 December 2024	N/A
35	"¿Fue Guzmán?"	6 December 2024	N/A
36	"No eres el padre biológico de los mellizos"	9 December 2024	N/A
37	"¡Federica y yo somos amantes!"	10 December 2024	N/A
38	"¡Fue alguien de la escuela!"	11 December 2024	N/A
39	"Yo no soy su padre biológico"	12 December 2024	N/A
40	"¿Te vas a ir sin despedirte?"	13 December 2024	N/A
41	"Tino es un delincuente"	16 December 2024	N/A
42	"¿Tienes una hija en México?"	17 December 2024	N/A
43	"¿Eres Paulina?"	18 December 2024	N/A
44	"Paulina regresa"	19 December 2024	N/A
45	"Guzmán no es el creador de Maximax"	20 December 2024	N/A
46	"¡Tino es un defraudador!"	23 December 2024	N/A
47	"El beneficiario es Guzmán"	25 December 2024	N/A
48	"Guzmán me traicionó"	26 December 2024	N/A
49	"Estoy enamorada de ti"	27 December 2024	N/A
50	"Estas paredes ya no serán nuestras"	30 December 2024	N/A
51	"La familia feliz que fuimos"	1 January 2025	N/A
52	"Cómplices al rescate"	2 January 2025	N/A
53	"Yo no fui el donante"	3 January 2025	N/A
54	"Seré una mamá por conveniencia"	6 January 2025	N/A
55	"¡Somos los papás biológicos!"	7 January 2025	N/A
56	"El plan salió perfecto"	8 January 2025	N/A
57	"Que el lisiado se quede con su padre"	9 January 2025	N/A
58	"Voy a dejar que se lleven a Emi"	10 January 2025	N/A
59	"Emiliano no es tu hijo"	13 January 2025	N/A
60	"¡Fue Facundo!"	14 January 2025	N/A
61	"Me obligaba a mentirte"	15 January 2025	N/A
62	"Te voy a denunciar"	16 January 2025	N/A
63	"¡Lila no quiere saber de mí!"	17 January 2025	N/A
64	"¡Lo nuestro terminó!"	20 January 2025	N/A
65	"Tengo la USB que necesita Tino"	21 January 2025	N/A
66	"Para alguien especial"	22 January 2025	N/A
67	"¿Guzmán el padre de mis hijos?"	23 January 2025	N/A
68	"No se lastima a quien se ama"	24 January 2025	N/A
69	"Ayúdame a boicotear a Tino y a Aidé"	27 January 2025	N/A
70	"Todo el mal que se hace, se regresa"	28 January 2025	N/A
71	"Oliver me dijo que sería la primera"	29 January 2025	N/A
72	"Quiero entrar a tu corazón"	30 January 2025	N/A
73	"Un recuerdo enterrado sale a la luz"	31 January 2025	N/A
74	"Jamás te hubiera lastimado Aidé"	3 February 2025	N/A
75	"Mi hijo es tuyo Chano"	4 February 2025	N/A
76	"Por desgracia mía eres el padre de mis hijos"	5 February 2025	N/A
77	"¿Quieres casarte conmigo?"	6 February 2025	N/A
78	"Yo quiero acabar con Tino"	7 February 2025	N/A
79	"¿Guzmán fue quien abusó de ti?"	9 February 2025	5.61
80	"Los tuyos, los míos y el nuestro"	9 February 2025	5.61

=== Specials ===
Title	Original release date
"Nuestra mejor Navidad es seguirnos queriendo"	24 December 2024
The economic situation among the families is not the same as they are used to and the children must learn that life is not all about presents and materialism. Annoyed, Emiliano and Scarlett make a Christmas wish: that the responsible adults who scold them disappear from their lives. The next day they wake up alone and without parental supervision. Only irresponsible adults remain on earth and Guzmán and Federica arrive with gifts and junk food for the children. Federica and Guzmán look for a way to make it permanent so that Tino and Aidé never return and the children become their slaves. Emiliano starts to feel ill and in severe pain and the kids don't know how to help him because there are no adults. This situation makes them all begin to miss their parents so they ask for their wish to be reversed. Tino and Aidé reappear and all the families gather at Tino's house to celebrate Christmas.
"Especial de año nuevo"	31 December 2024
The main cast have a New Year's Eve dinner together, where they share their favorite traditions. This episode also features bloopers and music videos from the telenovela's soundtrack.

== Music ==
Papás por conveniencia (Banda Sonora)

Soundtrack album by Cast of Papás por conveniencia
- Released: 11 October 2024
- Length: 39:12
- Label: Warner Music México

Papás por conveniencia (Banda Sonora) is the soundtrack album to the series. It was released by Warner Music México on 11 October 2024. The soundtrack features new versions of songs from children's telenovelas produced by Rosy Ocampo.

No.	Title	Writer(s)	Performer(s)	Length
1.	"Locos De Amor"	Cristina Abaroa; Pablo Aguirre; Alejandro Abaroa; Salvador Núñez	Daniela Luján; Martín Ricca	2:40
2.	"Canción de Martín"	A. Abaroa; Jorge Nazar; Marcelo Buquet; Núñez	Martín Ricca	2:53
3.	"Es Tiempo de Amar"	C. Abaroa; Aguirre; A. Abaroa; Núñez	Daniela Luján	3:27
4.	"Dame Una Seña"	A. Abaroa; C. Abaroa; Aguirre; Roberto Zamudio	Ariadne Díaz	3:04
5.	"Ese Beso"	Alejandro Carballo	María Chacón	2:52
6.	"Tu Rey León"	C. Abaroa; María Dolores González	Miguel Martínez	2:58
7.	"Más Que Amistad"	A. Abaroa; C. Abaroa; Aguirre	María Chacón; Miguel Martínez	3:02
8.	"Medley Nueva Pandilla: La Fuerza de la Amistad / Alcanzar La Libertad"	A. Abaroa; Jesús Flores	Joaquín Bondoni; María Perroni; Emilio Beltrán; Victoria Viera; Camila Núñez; Juan Pablo Velasco; Tania Nicole	2:29
9.	"El Baile del Sapito"	A. Abaroa; C. Abaroa; Aguirre	Martín Ricca	3:05
10.	"De Nuevo El Amor"	A. Abaroa; C. Abaroa; Aguirre	Ariadne Díaz; José Ron	3:45
11.	"Medley Koktel: Alegrijes Y Rebujos / Guerra De Los Sexos / Aventuras En El Tiempo / Cómplices Al Rescate / Amigos X Siempre / Vamos Juntos / Misión S.O.S. / Te Invito A Volar / Perdóname / Superstar / El Diario De Daniela"	Adrián Possé; Carballo; C. Abaroa; Cynthia Salazar; Aguirre	Koktel Band	8:57
Total length:				39:12

== Reception ==
=== Ratings ===
Viewership and ratings per season of Papás por conveniencia
Season	Timeslot (CT)	Episodes	First aired		Last aired		Avg. viewers (millions)
Season	Timeslot (CT)	Episodes	Date	Viewers (millions)	Date	Viewers (millions)	Avg. viewers (millions)
1	Mon–Fri 8:30 p.m.	28	21 October 2024	2.74	9 February 2025	5.61	2.43

=== Awards and nominations ===
Year	Award	Category	Nominated	Result	Ref
2025	Premios Juventud	My Favorite Actor	José Ron	Nominated	
2025	Premios Juventud	My Favorite Actress	Ariadne Díaz	Nominated	
2025	Premios Juventud	They Make Me Fall in Love	Ariadne Díaz & José Ron	Nominated	
