= Hasta el fin del mundo =

Mexican telenovela

- Also known as: Until the End of Time
- Genre: Telenovela
- Created by: Kary Fajer
- Written by: Gerardo Luna; Gabriela Ortigoza
- Screenplay by: Francisco Rengifo; Jaime Arturo Díaz
- Story by: Enrique Estevanez; Laura Barneix; Marcelo Nacci
- Directed by: Ricardo de la Parra; Marta Luna
- Creative director: Florencio Zavala
- Starring: Pedro Fernández; Marjorie De Sousa; María Rojo; César Évora; Claudia Álvarez; Diego Olivera; Mariana Seoane; Julián Gil; David Zepeda; Leticia Perdigón
- Music by: Carlos Páramo
- Opening theme: See below
- Country of origin: Mexico
- Original language: Spanish
- No. of episodes: 206

Production
- Executive producer: Nicandro Díaz González
- Production locations: Mexico City, Mexico; Miami, Florida, United States; Panama City, Panama
- Cinematography: Gabriel Vázquez Bulman; Alejandro Frutos; Jesús Nájera
- Editors: Susana Valencia; Ioma Carmona; Rafael Minor
- Camera setup: Multi-camera
- Production company: Televisa

Original release
- Network: Canal de las Estrellas
- Release: May 3, 2014 – June 8, 2015

Related
- Lo que la vida me robó; Lo imperdonable; Dulce amor; El amor lo manejo yo; Dulce amor (Colombian TV series)

Hasta el fin del mundo (previously known as Sangre de guerreras), is a Mexican telenovela premiered on Canal de las Estrellas on July 28, 2014, and concluded on April 19, 2015. The series is produced for Televisa by Nicandro Díaz González and adapted by Kary Fajer, based on the Argentine telenovela produced by Telefe, entitled Dulce amor.

It stars Pedro Fernández, later replaced by David Zepeda, Marjorie De Sousa, María Rojo later replaced by Leticia Perdigón, César Évora, Claudia Álvarez, Diego Olivera as the titular characters, along with Mariana Seoane, Julián Gil, Roberto Palazuelos, and Roberto Vander as the main villains.

== Synopsis ==
Sofía Ripoll (Marjorie De Sousa), a beautiful, intelligent and strong character, is the general manager of the Ripoll chocolate factory, the girlfriend of Patricio Iturbide (Julián Gil) and the older sister of Alexa (Claudia Álvarez) and Daniela (Jade Fraser). When her father passes away, Sofia is in charge of the family business because her mother, Greta Bandy (Olivia Bucio), a widow of Ripoll, decides to dedicate her life to the plastic arts by evading her responsibilities.

Salvador Cruz (Pedro Fernández/David Zepeda) is a simple man, noble and nice; racing driver and mechanic, but because of a sabotage, he loses an important career that ends his dreams, being forced to accept a job as a driver of Sofía. Both feel an immediate attraction, starting a story where they must overcome a series of obstacles, among them Patricio, an ambitious man that under the orders of Gerónimo Peralta (Roberto Vander), uses Sofía in attempts to possess and dismantle the premises where the Ripoll chocolate factory is located. Sofía has another enemy nearby, Silvana Blanco (Mariana Seoane), her supposed best friend, a woman resentful of a past event that marked her against The Ripoll family, is Patricio's lover and both will form an alliance to destroy the chocolate factory while manipulating Sofía and the Ripoll family.

Alexa (Claudia Álvarez) is an extroverted girl, capricious and spoiled by her mother. She returns from Spain because her economic situation is complicated, but she has made her family believe that she has a successful career in the world of cinema. Arriving in the city, Armando Romero (Diego Olivera, friend and compadre of Salvador, is the one who comes to meet her, causing a great attraction in Alexa, who will suffer aggression by the jealousy of Irma (Aleida Núñez), Armando's sentimental partner.

Daniela is the smallest of the sisters. In a shopping center she meets Lucas Cavazos (Miguel Martínez) who is spontaneous and friendly, but has a difficult history due to the abandonment of Rosa, his mother and has been in the care of his grandmother Miguelina (María Prado), who works as cook at the Ripoll mansion. Lucas accepts illicit work in order to help his grandmother.

The Ripoll sisters, will have an accomplice and counselor, Fausto Rangel (Alejandro Tommasi) - a butler in the mansion to whom he dedicates a life of service. Greta harbours a secret which could change the life of the Ripoll sisters, especialy Sofia. Along with Alexa, and Daniela the three seek a path of fulfilment.

== Cast ==
=== Main ===
- Pedro Fernández as Salvador Cruz Sánchez / Chava
- Marjorie De Sousa as Sofía Ripoll Bandy
- María Rojo as Guadalupe "Lupita" Sánchez
- César Évora as Francisco "Paco" Fernández
- Claudia Álvarez as Alexa Ripoll Bandy
- Diego Olivera as Armando Romero
- Mariana Seoane as Silvana Blanco
- Julián Gil as Patricio Iturbide
- David Zepeda as Salvador Cruz Sánchez / Chava
- Leticia Perdigón as Guadalupe "Lupita" Sánchez

=== Secondary ===
- Roberto Vander as Gerónimo Peralta de la Riva
- Olivia Bucio as Greta Bandy de Ripoll
- Alejandro Tommasi as Fausto Rangel
- Aleida Núñez as Irma Fernández Martínez
- Julio Camejo as Matías Escudero
- Karla Sofía Gascón (Note: Credited as Carlos Gascón) as Alan Duncan
- María Prado as Miguelina Ávila
- Jorge Ortín as Refugio / Cuco
- Jade Fraser as Daniela Ripoll Bandy
- Miguel Martínez as Lucas Cavazos Valera
- Mariana Van Rankin as Marisol Cruz Sánchez
- Alan Slim as Cristian Blanco / Iker Gálvez
- Nicolás Chunga as Fernando "Nandito" Romero Fernández
- Roberto Palazuelos as Mauro Renzi
- Roberto Ballesteros as Comandante Félix Tavares
- Ricardo Barona as Antonio Manjarrez
- Ivonne Ley as Ceci
- Rafael del Villar as Langarica
- Carlos Cámara Jr. as Octavio Ripoll
- Ximena Herrera as Araceli Fernández
- Sugchey Abrego as Iraís
- Tony Bravo as Javier
- Eddy Vilard as Oliver Peralta
- Emireth Rivera as Morgana
- Rebeca Mankita as Isadora
- Vanessa Arias as Flor

=== Recurring ===
- Javier Jattin as Paolo Elizondo
- Arleth Terán as Regina Duarte
- Ricardo Margaleff as Pedro
- Lilia Aragón as Yuba
- Alberto Estrella as Don
- Pedro Moreno as Ranku
- Kuno Becker as Salvador's friend
- Roger Cudney as Mike Stone (Mister Sam)

== Mexico broadcast ==
On July 28, 2014, Canal de las Estrellas broadcast Hasta el fin del mundo weeknights at 9:25pm, replacing Lo que la vida me robó. The last episode was broadcast on April 19, 2015, with Lo imperdonable replacing it the following day.

Timeslot (MT)	No. of episodes	Premiered		Ended	
Timeslot (MT)	No. of episodes	Date	Premiere viewers (in points)	Date	Finale viewers (in points)
Monday to Friday 9:15PM	191	July 28, 2014	24.0	April 19, 2015	21.7

=== United States broadcast ===
On August 18, 2014, Univision broadcast Hasta el fin del mundo weeknights at 9pm/8c, replacing Lo Que La Vida Me Robó. The last episode was broadcast on May 15, 2015, with Lo imperdonable replacing it on May 18, 2015.

== Soundtrack ==
No.	Title	Artist(s)	Length
1.	"Hasta el fin del mundo"	Pedro Fernández	3:32
2.	"Puedes contar conmigo"	La Oreja de Van Gogh	4:22
3.	"Tu primera vez"	José José	4:32
4.	"Nada"	Prince Royce	4:03
5.	"Tu sonrisa"	Miguel Martínez	3:24
6.	"Te amaré"	Alejandro Fernández	3:50
7.	"Hasta el fin del mundo"	David Zepeda	3:02

== Awards and nominations ==
Year	Award	Category	Nominated	Result
2014	People en Español	Best telenovela	Nicandro Díaz González	Nominated
2014	People en Español	Best Actress	Marjorie de Sousa	Nominated
2014	People en Español	Galanazo del año	Pedro Fernández	Nominated
2014	People en Español	Best on-screen chemistry	Marjorie de Sousa and Pedro Fernández	Nominated
2014	People en Español	Best Female Antagonist	Mariana Seoane	Nominated
2014	People en Español	Best Male Antagonist	Julián Gil	Nominated
2014	New York Latin ACE Awards	Best telenovela	Nicandro Díaz González	Won
2014	New York Latin ACE Awards	Best Actress	María Rojo	Won
2015	Premios Juventud	Best Theme Novelero	"Te amaré" by Alejandro Fernández	Nominated
2015	Premios Juventud	Favorite Female Actress	Marjorie de Sousa	Nominated
2015	Kids Choice Awards México	Favorite Actor	Miguel Martínez	Nominated
2015	Kids Choice Awards México	Favorite Program or Series	Hasta el fin del mundo	Won
