= Código F.A.M.A. =

- Starring: Ernesto Laguardia, host
- Country of origin: Mexico

Production
- Running time: 1 hour (U.S.)

Original release
- Network: Televisa
- Release: 2003 – 2005

Código F.A.M.A. is the first reality television show for children in Mexico.

== Format ==
From thousands of auditions, 40 (in season 1), 16 (season 2), 17 (season 3) children are chosen to form the first "phase" of the show, which is called "Código Bronce" or "Code Bronze".

In the second phase, the finalists — 8 (season 1), 6 (seasons 2 and 3) — are revealed. The second phase is called "Código Plata" or "Code Silver".

The third and final phase is reached as a winner is announced and this level is known as "Código Oro" or "Code Gold".

Every participant who reaches a certain "code" receives a medal of the respective metal, i.e., bronze, silver or gold.

== Season 1: Código F.A.M.A. ==
=== Winner: Código Oro (Code Gold) ===
- Miguel Martínez

=== Finalists: Código Plata (Code Silver) ===
- 2nd place: Adán Nieves
- 3rd place: Gladys Gallegos
- 4th place: Sergio Guerrero
- 5th place: Xitlali Rodríguez
- 6th place: Diego Boneta (then credited as Diego González)
- 7th place: María Chacón
- 8th place: Jesús Zavala

=== Semifinalists ===
- 9th place: Nora Cano
- 10th place: Roberto Estrada

=== Quarterfinalists ===
- 11th place: Michelle Álvarez
- 12th place: Roxana Puente

=== Alegríjes y Rebujos ===
The winner, Miguel Martínez, went on to star in the Mexican soap opera Alegrijes y Rebujos", along with seven others from the final group of eight (María Chacón, Jesús Zavala, Diego González, Nora Cano, Michelle Álvarez, Antonio Hernández and Allisson Lozano). The soap opera was a success, as were the two soundtrack albums that were released from the show. All eight of the actors continued to perform as a musical group with the same name as the soap opera. They toured Mexico and were also involved in the second season of Código F.A.M.A.. Miguel’s family also won a brand new Toyota Sequoia.

== Season 2: Código F.A.M.A. 2 ==
=== Winner: Código Oro (Code Gold) ===
- Jonathan Becerra

=== Finalists: Código Plata (Code Silver) ===
- 2nd place: Marijose Salazar
- 3rd place: Jorge Escobedo
- 4th place: Alex Rivera
- 5th place: Brissia Mayagoitia
- 6th place: J. Sergio Ortiz Pérez

=== Eliminated: Código Bronce (Code Bronze) ===
- 7th: José Alberto Inzunza
- 8th: Anhuar Escalante
- 9th: Elizabeth Martínez Saldívar
- 10th: Claudia Ledón Olguín
- 11th: Paula Gutierrez D'Esesarte
- 12th: Viviana Ramos Macouzet
- 13th: María Fernanda González
- 14th: Israel Salas Hernández
- 15th: Ricardo Lorenzo Balderas
- 16th: Mónica López Alonso

=== Misión S.O.S. ===
The winner went on to star in the novela Misión S.O.S. with three other contestants (Marijose Salazar, Alex Rivera and Anhuar Escalante). Also appearing were contestants from the first season of Código FAMA, including Miguel Martínez (the winner) and Gladys Gallegos in her first TV role. The novela was also a success. They also kept a group with the same name as the novela, toured Mexico and released a soundtrack with original music made for the telenovela.

== Season 3: Código F.A.M.A. 3 ==
=== Winner: Código Oro (Code Gold) ===
- Adriana Ahumada

=== Finalists: Código Plata (Code Silver) ===
- Miguel Jiménez
- Fernanda Jiménez
- Rodrigo Salas

=== Eliminated: Código Bronce (Code Bronze) ===
- Jesús Trejo
- Alann Mora
- Evelin Acosta
- Maritza Barraza
- Joel Bernal
- Cecilia Camacho
- Ricardo Ceceña
- Estefania Contreras
- Mariana Dávila
- Iván Félix
- Juan José Huerta
- Alejandra Leza
- Mónica López
- Claritze Rodríguez
- Joel Bernal

=== La Fea Más Bella ===
Unlike the previous winners, there was not a children's telenovela starring Adriana Ahumada. She had a small role in the telenovela by the same producer of the show. She played the daughter of Lola, who is a part of Letty's "Ugly Squad". Also appearing were Miguel Jiménez and Fernanda Jiménez, who also had small roles in La Fea Más Bella, as the son of Paula María and the daughter of Martha (Paula and Martha are also part of Letty's "Ugly Squad").

The winner of Codigo F.A.M.A. International, Elizabeth Suarez, was the only one that could not participate in La fea mas bella because she was living in Dominican Republic. She was supposed to make a soap opera in Mexico, but the project never continued.

== International: Código F.A.M.A. Internacional ==
This fourth installment began immediately after CF3 concluded. Twenty participants, representing Latin American countries, the United States and Spain, were brought to Mexico to compete for the Code Diamond prize: a recording/acting contract, a music tour of all the twenty participating countries, and scholarships.

=== Winner: Código Diamante (Code Diamond) ===
- Elizabeth María Suárez Rosario, Dominican Republic

=== Finalists ===
- 2nd place: Felipe Morales Saez, Chile
- 3rd place: Fabiola Rodas, Guatemala
- 4th place: Priscilla Alcantara, Brazil
- 5th place: Miguel Darío Narváez Romero, Paraguay

=== Semi-finalists ===
- Laura Natalia Esquivel, Argentina
- Oscar Mario Paz Hurtado, Bolivia
- Steve Alberto Cabrera Ortega, Ecuador
- Daniela Hernández, El Salvador
- Gabriel Morales, United States

=== Eliminated participants ===
- Adriana Ahumada, Mexico
- Jessie Gabriela Flores Madrid, Honduras
- Lucila María Morena Arana, Nicaragua
- Kevin Alberca Alarcón, Peru
- Erika Lisbeth Loaiza Ramírez, Colombia
- Génesis Díaz Bejarano, Costa Rica
- Javier Vidal Martínez, Spain
- Nallybeth Araúz Martínez, Panama
- Nicolás Aquino Goicoechea, Uruguay
- Asly D'Janine Toro Álvarez, Venezuela

=== Telenovela ===
The winner, Elizabeth María Suárez Rosario, has yet to appear in a TV part or record an album.
