= Miguel Martínez (actor) =

Mexican actor and singer (1994)

- Born: Miguel Francisco Martínez Martín; 15 February 1991 (age 35); Guasave, Sinaloa, Mexico
- Occupations: Actor, singer
- Years active: 1999–present

Miguel Martínez (born 15 February 1991) is a Mexican actor and singer.

== Filmography ==
Television
Year	Title	Role	Notes
1999	Serafín	Risitas	
2003	Código F.A.M.A.	Himself	
2003–2004	Alegrijes y Rebujos	Alfonso Pascual "Alcachofa"	Lead role
2004–2005	Misión S.O.S. aventura y amor	Rodrigo Guerra	
2005	Celebremos México: Para amarte más	Himself	TV movie documentary
2005	La energía de Sonric'slandia	Himself	"Navidad" (season 1, episode 26)
2009–2010	Atrévete a soñar	Francisco	"Parte I: Inesperado reencuentro" (season 1, episode 0); "Parte II: Llegando a la ciudad" (season 1, episode 1); "¿Nos conocemos?" (season 1, episode 2); "Con quién" (season 1, episode 114); "Rescate" (season 1, episode 251)
2008–2012	La rosa de Guadalupe	Jesús / Saúl	2 episodes
2014	Quiero amarte	Tadeo	12 episodes
2014–2015	Hasta el fin del mundo	Lucas Cavazos Valera	Supporting role; 191 episodes
2015–2016	Simplemente María	Fabián Garza Treviño	Supporting role; 126 episodes
2018	Hijas de la luna	Todoelmundo / Egidio	Supporting role; 82 episodes
2020–2021	La mexicana y el güero	Ignacio "Nacho" Santoyo de la Mora	Supporting role; 127 episodes
2021	Vencer el pasado	Erik Sánchez Vidal	Supporting role
2022	Vencer la ausencia	Erik Sánchez Vidal	Supporting role
2022	Mira quién baila	Contestant	Season 10
2023	Reto 4 elementos: La Liga Extrema	Contestant	
2024	Papás por conveniencia	Chano	

== Discography ==
- La chica de mis sueños (2004)

== Awards and nominations ==
Year	Award	Category	Nominated works	Result
2015	Kids Choice Awards México	Favorite Actor	Hasta el fin del mundo	Nominated
