= María Chacón =

Mexican actress

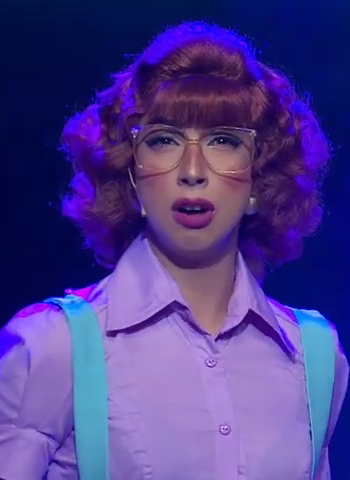
- Chacón as Dulce at Mentiras, el musical medley in Los Metro Awards 2018

Background information
- Born: María Fernanda Chacón Romo
- Origin: Ensenada, Baja California, Mexico
- Genres: Latin pop, rock, pop
- Occupations: Singer, actress
- Years active: 2000–present

María Fernanda Chacón Romo is a Mexican actress and singer.

== Filmography ==
=== Television ===
Year	Title	Role
2002–03	Código F.A.M.A.	Herself
2003–04	Alegrijes y Rebujos	Sofia "Chofis" Domingez
2004–05	Misión S.O.S	Chanya
2005–06	Peregrina	Edith
2006	Mujer, casos de la vida real	Beatriz
2006	¡Qué madre tan padre!	Jessica Hernandez
2009	La rosa de Guadalupe	Natalia/Magda
2012	Un refugio para el amor	Young Paz Flores de Jacinto
2012	Como dice el dicho	Clarisa
2018–19	Simón dice	Nicole
2019	Silvia Pinal, frente a ti	Alondra
2019–2022	Se rentan cuartos	Shantallé
2022	Cabo	Rebeca
2024	Papás por conveniencia	Lichita

== Discography ==
Year	Title
2000	Codigo Fama
2000	Alegrijes y Rebujos "Disco Alegrije"
2000	Alegrijes y Rebujos "Disco Rebujo"
2005	Días Que No Vuelven
