= Rosy Ocampo =

Mexican executive producer and director (born 1959)

- Born: November 11, 1959 (age 66); Mexico City, Mexico
- Occupations: Television executive, showrunner
- Years active: 1986–present

Rosy Ocampo (born on November 11, 1959) is a Mexican showrunner, television executive and producer. She was the VP of Content for Televisa (2017-2018), where she created and executed strategies to help further develop and produce content for all the network’s free and pay-TV channels, targeting both Televisa and its sister network Univision.

== Filmography ==
Executive producer, associate producer
Year	Title	Notes
1986	Martín Garatuza	Associate producer
1994	Operalia	TV program-executive producer
1998-99	El diario de Daniela	Executive producer
2000	Amigos x siempre	Executive producer
2000–2001	Rayito de luz	Executive producer
2001	Aventuras en el tiempo	Executive producer
2002	Cómplices al rescate	Executive producer
2003–2005	Código F.A.M.A.	Reality show-executive producer
2003–2004	Alegrijes y Rebujos	Executive producer
2004–2005	Misión S.O.S	Executive producer
2006–2007	La fea más bella	Executive producer
2007	Amor sin maquillaje	Executive producer
2008	Las tontas no van al cielo	Executive producer
2009–2010	Camaleones	Executive producer
2011	La fuerza del destino	Executive producer
2012	Por ella soy Eva	Executive producer
2013	Mentir para vivir	Executive producer
2013–2014	Qué pobres tan ricos	Executive producer
2015–2016	Antes muerta que Lichita	Executive producer
2017	La doble vida de Estela Carrillo	Executive producer
2020	Vencer el miedo	Executive producer
2020–2021	Vencer el desamor	Executive producer
2021	Vencer el pasado	Executive producer
2022	Vencer la ausencia	Executive producer
2023	Más allá de ti	Executive producer
2023	Vencer la culpa	Executive producer
2024	Papás por conveniencia	Executive producer
2026	Cruzando destinos: Marruecos en el corazón	Executive producer

== Awards and nominations ==
Year	Award	Category	Telenovela	Result
2003	Premios TVyNovelas	Special Award for Projection of Infant Telenovela		Won
2004	Premios TVyNovelas	Special Award for Infant Rod		Won
2005	Premios TVyNovelas	Best Telenovela of the Year	Misión S.O.S	Nominated
2007	Premios TVyNovelas	Best Telenovela of the Year	La Fea Más Bella	Won
2010	Premios TVyNovelas	Special Award for Favorite Telenovela of Public	La Fea Más Bella	Won
2012	Premios TVyNovelas	Best Telenovela of the Year	La Fuerza del Destino	Won
2012	Premios People en Español	Best Telenovela	Por Ella Soy Eva	Won
