= Misión S.O.S =

Mexican telenovela

- Genre: Telenovela
- Created by: Rosa Salazar
- Written by: Ricardo Fiallega
- Directed by: Isaías Gómez; Salvador Sánchez; Eduardo Said
- Starring: Maribel Guardia; Guillermo Capetillo; Manuel Ojeda; Gabriela Goldsmith; Magda Guzmán; Maribel Fernández; Diana Golden; Raúl Magaña; Silvia Lomelĺ; Johnny Lozada
- Theme music composer: Alejandro Abaroa; Cristina Abaroa
- Opening theme: "Misión S.O.S" by Children's cast
- Country of origin: Mexico
- Original language: Spanish
- No. of episodes: 125

Production
- Executive producer: Rosy Ocampo
- Producer: Eduardo Meza
- Editor: Mauricio Cortés
- Production company: Televisa

Original release
- Network: Canal de las Estrellas
- Release: August 2, 2004 – January 21, 2005

Related
- Amy, la niña de la mochila azul; Sueños y caramelos

Misión S.O.S. is a Mexican telenovela produced by Rosy Ocampo for Televisa. It premiered on August 2, 2004, and ended on January 21, 2005. It stars Maribel Guardia, Guillermo Capetillo, Diego González, and Allisson Lozz.

== Plot ==
The story follows the life of Diana, a pre-teen who lives in a neighborhood called Buenaventura, along with her friends, Alonso, Federica, Rodrigo, Alejandro and Dany. Christian has moved from New York to Mexico due to his parents' divorce. Diana and Christian quickly become best friends, despite their families hatred for each other. Years before, Christian's father and Diana's mother were in love, but their relationship was soured by Severiano, Christian's grumpy and selfish grandfather.

However, the neighbors of Buenaventura have even darker futures, as they are in danger of losing their homes, their school and much more, because the evil old Severiano plans to tear down the neighborhood and build an enormous shopping mall in its place. To accomplish his plan, Severiano is willing to resort to any means, and will provoke a series of disasters to drive the inhabitants away.

At the old theater, the children meet a mysterious man. Chaneque, an elf, is on a mission to save his world from destruction. He convinces the children to join him. They go on a series of adventures. During their journey, they gather clues to save their neighborhood. Christian and Diana also try to end the feud between their families.

== Cast ==
- Maribel Guardia as Ximena Lozano, adult heroine, Salvador's love interest
- Guillermo Capetillo as Salvador Martinez, adult hero, Ximena's love interest
- Manuel Ojeda as Severiano Martinez, antagonist
- Gabriela Goldsmith as Vivian Johnson, antagonist, Christian's mother who does not love him
- Magda Guzmán as Justina Aranda, Diana's grandmother, has arthritis
- Maribel Fernández as Angeles, Severiano's servant and maid, Christian's friend
- Diana Golden as Doris Ramirez, Federica and Rodrigo's mother, likes to think she is rich, verbally abuses Federica
- Raúl Magaña as Leonardo, antagonist, works for Severiano
- Silvia Lomeli as Lidia Rendon, the children's teacher
- Johnny Lozada as Gonzalo Ortega, Alejandro and Dany's father, irresponsible
- Zaide Silvia Gutiérrez as Lupe Espinos, Alonso and Monica's mother
- Roberto Sen as Rosendo Espinos, beats his children, changes his ways in the end
- Lucia Guilamin as Ramona Acevedo, Monchita's aunt, principal of the elementary school
- Alejandro Ruiz as Ezequiel Guerra, Federica and Rodrigo's father, works for Severiano
- Adalberto Parra as El Tlacuahe, a hobo that the children are scared of, ends up being Ximena's long lost brother
- Marco Uriel as Edor, antagonist, terrible being in the Chaneque world
- Aurora Clavel as Pura
- Juan Peláez as Augusto
- Wendy González as Monica Espinos, adolescent heroine, Felipe's love interest
- Marco Antonio Valdes as Felipe Lozano, adolescent hero, Monica's love interest
- Naidelyn Narravete as Gaby, adolescent antagonist, tries to break up Monica and Felipe
- Ricardo De Pascual Jr. as Fermín
- Erick Guecha as Diego "El Dragón" López
- Jonathan Becerra as Alejandro Ortega, Dany's big brother, is responsible for Dany and often wins money so they are able to eat
- Diego González as Christian Martinez, child hero, Diana's love interest
- Allisson Lozz as Diana Lozano, child heroine, Christian's love interest
- Miguel Martínez as Rodrigo Guerra, child antagonist, stubborn and jealous of Christian, eventually accepts everything and becomes good
- Jesús Zavala as El Chaneque, hero, the children's elf friend
- Alejandro Correa as Dany Ortega, Alejandro's younger brother
- Anhuar Escalante as Alonso, physically abused by his father, has asthma and enjoys reading fairytales
- Gladys Gallegos as Federica Guerra, verbally abused by her family
- Marijose Salazar as Monchita Acevedo, child antagonist, greedy to the Pandilla, in the end joins the mission and becomes good
- Alex Rivera as Hugo, child antagonist, fights Alejandro, becomes good in the end and joins the mission
- Alejandro Speitzer as QuechaneChale, one of the male Chaneques
- María Chacón as Chanya, one of the female Chaneques
- Nora Cano as Chanequita, one of the female Chaneques
- Alex Goldberg as Piropolo, one of the male Chaneques
- Irma Lozano as Clemencia

== Soundtrack ==
Misión S.O.S. (Aventura y Amor)

Soundtrack album by Various artists
- Released: 2004
- Length: 1:02:22
- Label: BMG Mexico
- Producer: Alejandro Abaroa

No.	Title	Artist(s)	Length
1.	"Misión S.O.S."	Diego Gonzalez, Allison Lozano, Jonathan Becerra, Pandilla	3:36
2.	"Perdoname"	Pandilla	4:10
3.	"Atado A Nada"	Jonathan Becerra	4:06
4.	"Romeo y Julieta"	Allison Lozano	4:05
5.	"Tú y Yo"	Diego Gonzalez & Allison Lozano	3:50
6.	"No Te Escaparas"	Diego Gonzalez	3:03
7.	"Te Invito A Volar"	Pandilla	3:23
8.	"Cuentas Conmigo"	Jonathan Becerra	3:16
9.	"Magico Amor"	Jesús Zavala	3:10
10.	"Mi Reflejo"	Gladys Gallegos	3:30
11.	"Una Vez Más"	Diego Gonzalez & Allison Lozano	3:25
12.	"Busca Las Respuestas"	Pandilla	3:27
13.	"Ven"	Jonathan Becerra	3:09
14.	"Entre Tú y Yo"	Jonathan Becerra & Gladys Gallegos	2:51
15.	"Guerra de los Sexos"	Pandilla	3:02
16.	"Donde Estes"	Jonathan Becerra	2:58
17.	"Alguien Tan Especial"	Diego Gonzalez & Allison Lozano	3:46
18.	"Vamos Juntos"	Pandilla	3:35
Total length:			1:02:22

== Awards and nominations ==
Year	Ceremony	Category	Nominee	Result
2005	23rd TVyNovelas Awards	Best Telenovela	Rosy Ocampo	Nominated
2005	23rd TVyNovelas Awards	Best Child Performance	Diego González	Nominated
2005	23rd TVyNovelas Awards	Best Child Performance	Jonathan Becerra	Won
2005	23rd TVyNovelas Awards	Best Child Performance	Marijose Salazar	Nominated
2005	23rd TVyNovelas Awards	Best Direction	Isaías Gómez; Salvador Sánchez	Nominated
