= Alegrijes y Rebujos =

- Genre: Telenovela; Fantasy; Comedy horror
- Created by: Palmira Olguín
- Written by: Palmira Olguín; Carmen Sepúlveda; Miguel Angel Solá; Claudia Velasco
- Directed by: Salvador Sánchez; Eduardo Said; Isaías Gómez
- Starring: Eugenia Cauduro; Miguel de León; Luis Roberto Guzmán; Jacqueline Bracamontes
- Theme music composer: Alejandro Abaroa
- Opening theme: "Alegrijes y Rebujos" by Children's cast
- No. of episodes: 135

Production
- Executive producer: Rosy Ocampo
- Producers: Eduardo Meza; María Alba Espinosa
- Production locations: Televisa San Ángel; Mexico City, Mexico
- Editors: Alfredo Juárez; Felipe Ortiz Canseco
- Camera setup: Multi-camera
- Running time: 41-44 minutes
- Production company: Televisa

Original release
- Network: Canal de las Estrellas
- Release: August 4, 2003 – February 20, 2004

Alegrijes y Rebujos (English title: Don Darvelio's Secret) is a Mexican children's comedy horror telenovela produced by Rosy Ocampo for Televisa. It aired on Canal de las Estrellas from August 4, 2003, to February 20, 2004.

Miguel de León, Jacqueline Bracamontes, Luis Roberto Guzmán and the leading actor Héctor Ortega starred as protagonists, María Chacón and Miguel Martínez starred as child protagonists known as the "Alegrijes", while Rosa María Bianchi starred as adult antagonist, Allisson Lozz, Diego Boneta and Jesús Zavala starred as child antagonists known as the "Rebujos", Arath de la Torre, Roxana Castellanos, Ruben Cerda, Salvador Sánchez, Luz Elena González, Eugenia Cauduro (later replaced by Cecilia Gabriela) and Sebastián Rulli starred as stellar performances.

== Plot ==
Alegrijes y Rebujos follows the story of the ghost of an eccentric millionaire, Don Darvelio, who is said to haunt the mansion. With a jealous stepmother, an inattentive father and a mean brother, Sofia has many problems.

Nonetheless, she wants to find out if there really are ghosts in the mansion, inhabited now by a strange former servant named Chon. Sofia secretly enters the mansion to recover a picture of her mother, who died when she was a baby.

There, she meets Alfonso, Chon's grandnephew. To their amazement, the children discover Don Darvelio is not dead, and he is the one who has been "haunting" the mansion for the last few years.

The elderly man finds the happiness he has long sought through Sofia and Alfonso, whom he calls "Alegrijes" (or "Happies"). He describes Alegrijes as people who embrace life, remain hopeful, support one another through good and difficult times, and maintain a sense of wonder.

Sofia, Alfonso and Don Darvelio have adventures that they share with other neighborhood children: Allison, Ricardo, Ernestina, Pablo and even Esteban, Sofia's disagreeable brother.

Don Darvelio decides to transform his mansion into a place where all the children and their families can live together. However, he becomes seriously ill with the arrival of Helga, his wicked ex-wife, who wants to take over the mansion and destroy the dreams and love the old man has created.

In order to overcome Helga and her mean allies, the "Rebujos" (or Grumpies), the children must employ their best values: friendship, truthfulness, fair competition, love, and happiness.

== Cast ==
=== Main ===
- Eugenia Cauduro as Mercedes Goyeneche de Dominguez (episodes 1–42)
- Miguel de León as Antonio Domínguez
- Cecilia Gabriela as Mercedes Goyenehe de Dominguez (episodes 43–122)
- Luis Roberto Guzmán as Bruno Reyes
- Jacqueline Bracamontes as Angélica Rivas Márquez de Domínguez
- Rosa María Bianchi as Helga Aguayo Vargas "La Rebruja"
- Hector Ortega as Don Darvelio Granados Linares
- Salvador Sánchez as Asunción "Chon" Yunque
- Olivia Bucio as Teresa "Tere" Aguayo Rosas de Garza
- Luz Elena González as Irina Calleja
- Sebastián Rulli as Rogelio Díaz Mercado
- Raquel Pankowsky as Consuelo "Chelito" Márquez Vda. de Rivas
- Roxana Castellanos as Elvira Gómez de Sánchez
- Rubén Cerda as Rodolfo Maldonado "Fito"
- Adriana Laffan as Flor Cárdenas de Maldonado
- María Chacón as Sofia Domínguez "Chofis"
- Miguel Martínez as Alfonso Pascual "Alcachofa"
- Jesús Zavala as Esteban Domínguez Goyeneche
- Diego Boneta as Ricardo Sánchez Gómez
- Nora Cano as Nayelli Sánchez Gómez
- Michelle Álvarez as Ernestina Garza Aguayo "Tina"
- Tony Cobián as Pablo Maldonado Cárdenas "El Chuletón"
- Allisson Lozz as Allison Garza Aguayo
- Arath de la Torre as Matías Sánchez

=== Recurring ===
- Raúl Sebastián as Don Darvelio's ghost
- Alfonso Iturralde as Santiago Garza
- Alejandro Contreras as Alejandro
- Margarito as Reficus
- Andrés Salas as Luis Domínguez
- Rogelio Báez as El Chompi
- Salvador Garcini as Lorenzo
- Paco Ibáñez as Captain Sangre
- Aida Pierce as Madam Meshú
- Archie Lafranco as Guarura
- Odín Dupeyrón as Lupillo
- Hector Parra as Enrique
- Hector Cruz as Polo Velarde
- Jose Antonio Ferral as Police
- Alejandro Villeli as Elf magic
- César Castro as Lawyer
- Juan Romanca as Doctor
- Radamés de Jesús as Veterinario
- Martha Sabrina as Margarita
- Carlos Speitzer as Child dimension of darkness
- Génesis Bages as Child of darkness

=== Guest star ===
- Danna Paola as Amy Granados

== Awards ==
Year	Award	Category	won	Result
2004	22nd TVyNovelas Awards	Best Supporting Actor	Arath de la Torre	Nominated
2004	22nd TVyNovelas Awards	Best Female Revelation	Jacqueline Bracamontes	Won
2004	INTE Awards	Youth Program of the Year	Rosy Ocampo	Won

== Discography ==
- Disco Alegrije (2003)
- Disco Rebujo (2003)
- Navidad Alegrije (2003)
- Navidad Rebujo (2003)
- Alegrijes y Rebujos en Concierto (2004)
