= 6th TVyNovelas Awards =

1988 Mexican TV awards

- Date: April 18, 1988
- Location: Centro de Espectaculos premier, México D.F.
- Hosted by: Claudia Córdova & Raúl Velasco

Highlights
- Most awards: Quinceañera (8)
- Most nominations: Victoria (10)

Television/radio coverage
- Network: Canal de las Estrellas

The 6th TVyNovelas Awards were an academy of special awards to the best soap operas and TV shows. The awards ceremony took place on April 18, 1988, in Centro Libanes, México D.F. The ceremony was televised in Mexico by Canal de las Estrellas.

Claudia Córdova and Raúl Velasco hosted the show. Quinceañera won 8 awards, the most for the evening, including Best Telenovela. Other winners Senda de gloria won 4 awards, Rosa salvaje won 2 awards and Victoria and Tal como somos won 1 each.

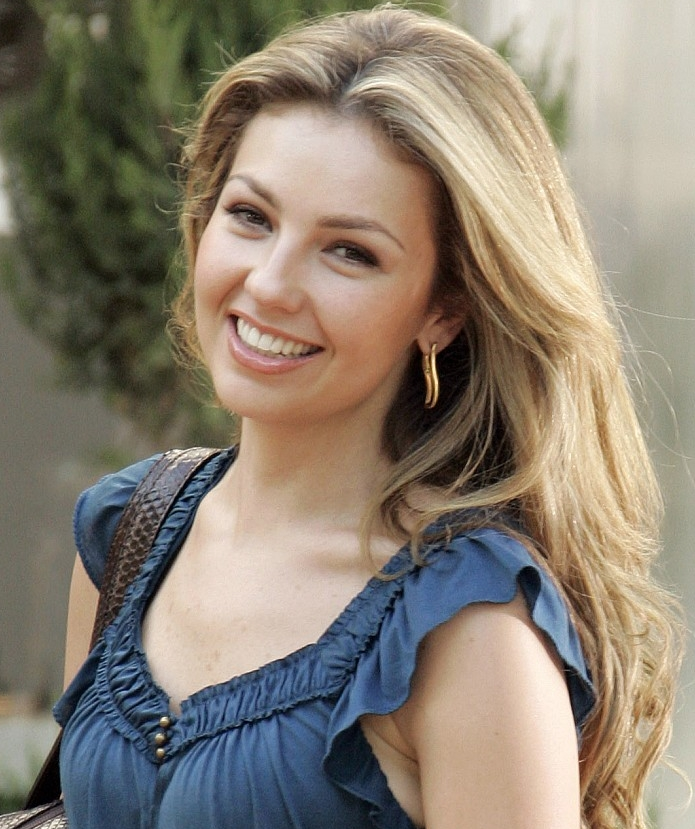
Thalía, winner for Best Female Revelation.

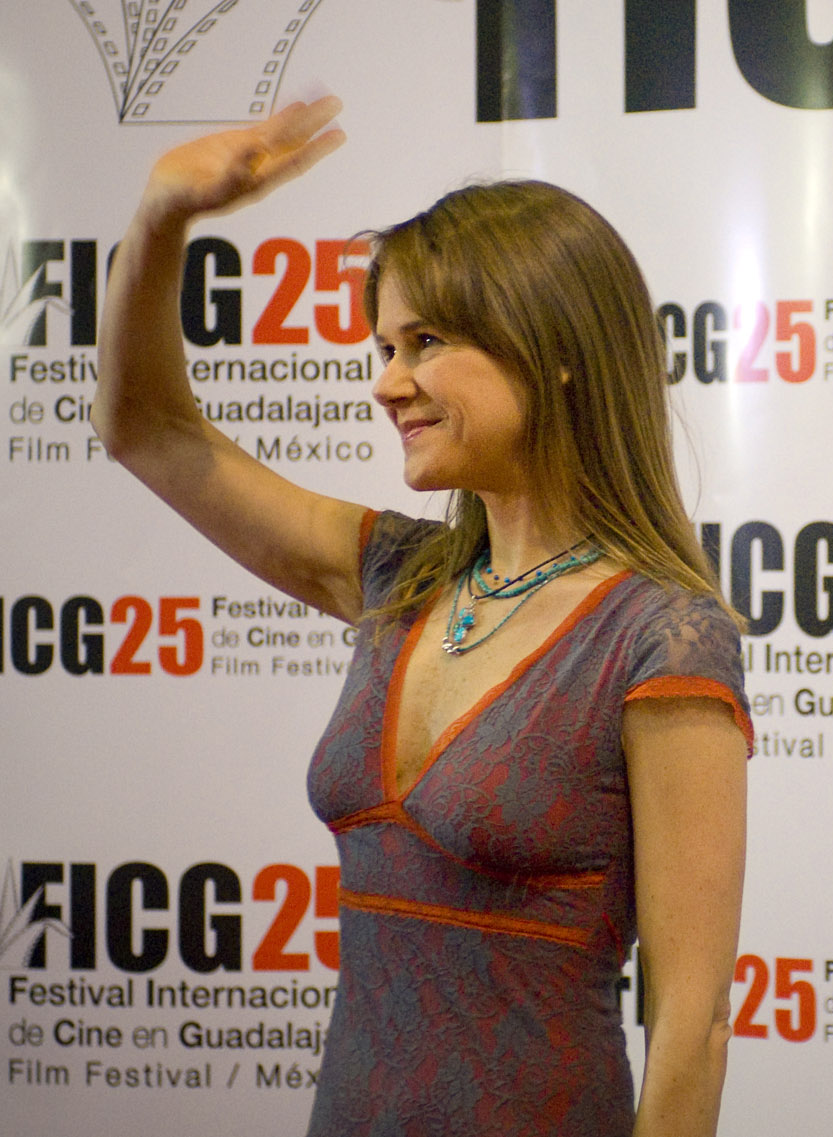
Nailea Norvind, winner in the category for Best Debut Actress or Actor.

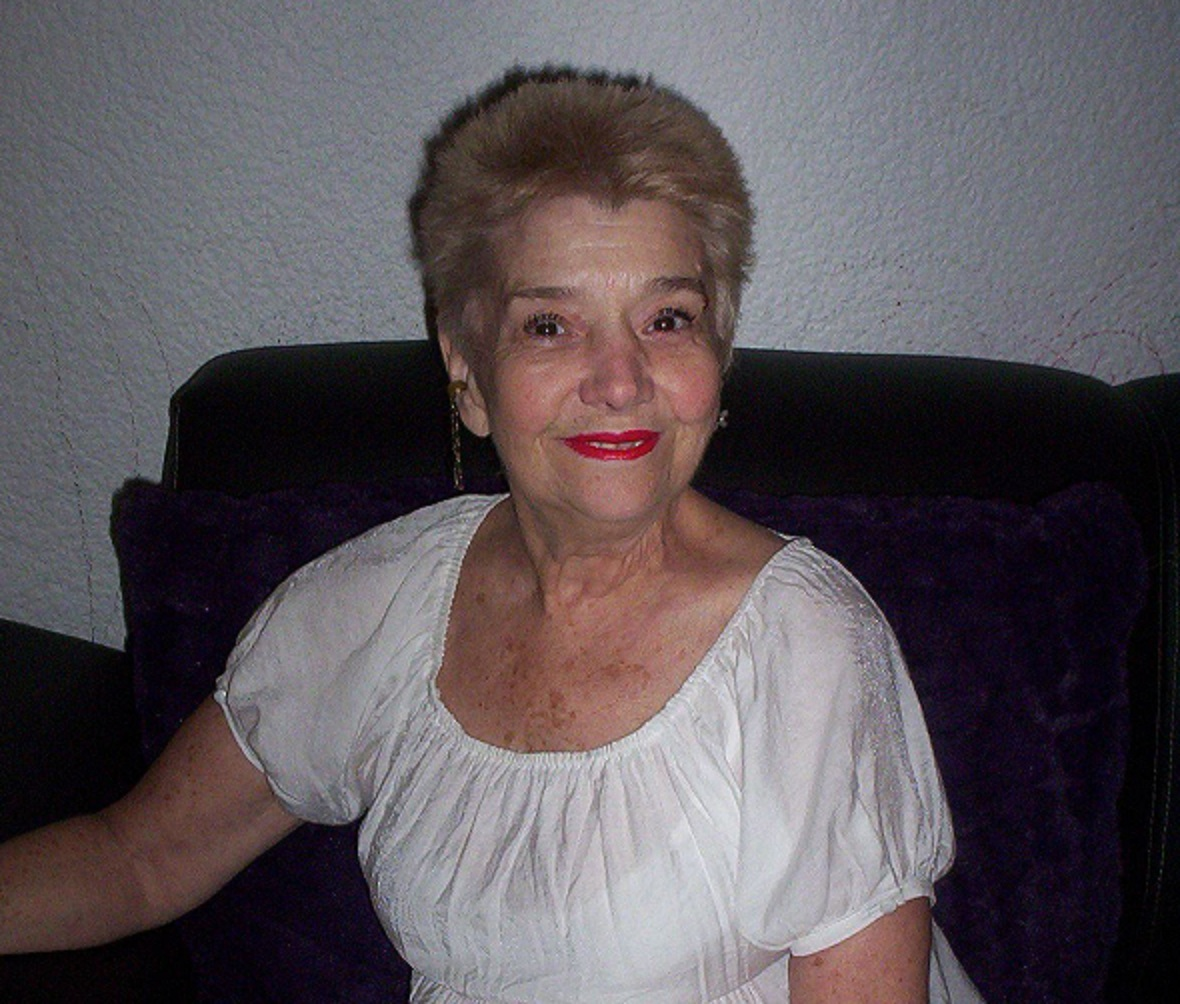
María Luisa Alcalá, winner for Best Comedy Actress.

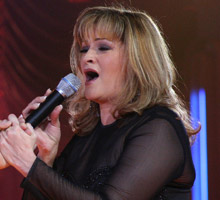
Rocío Banquells, winner for Best Female TV-Singer.

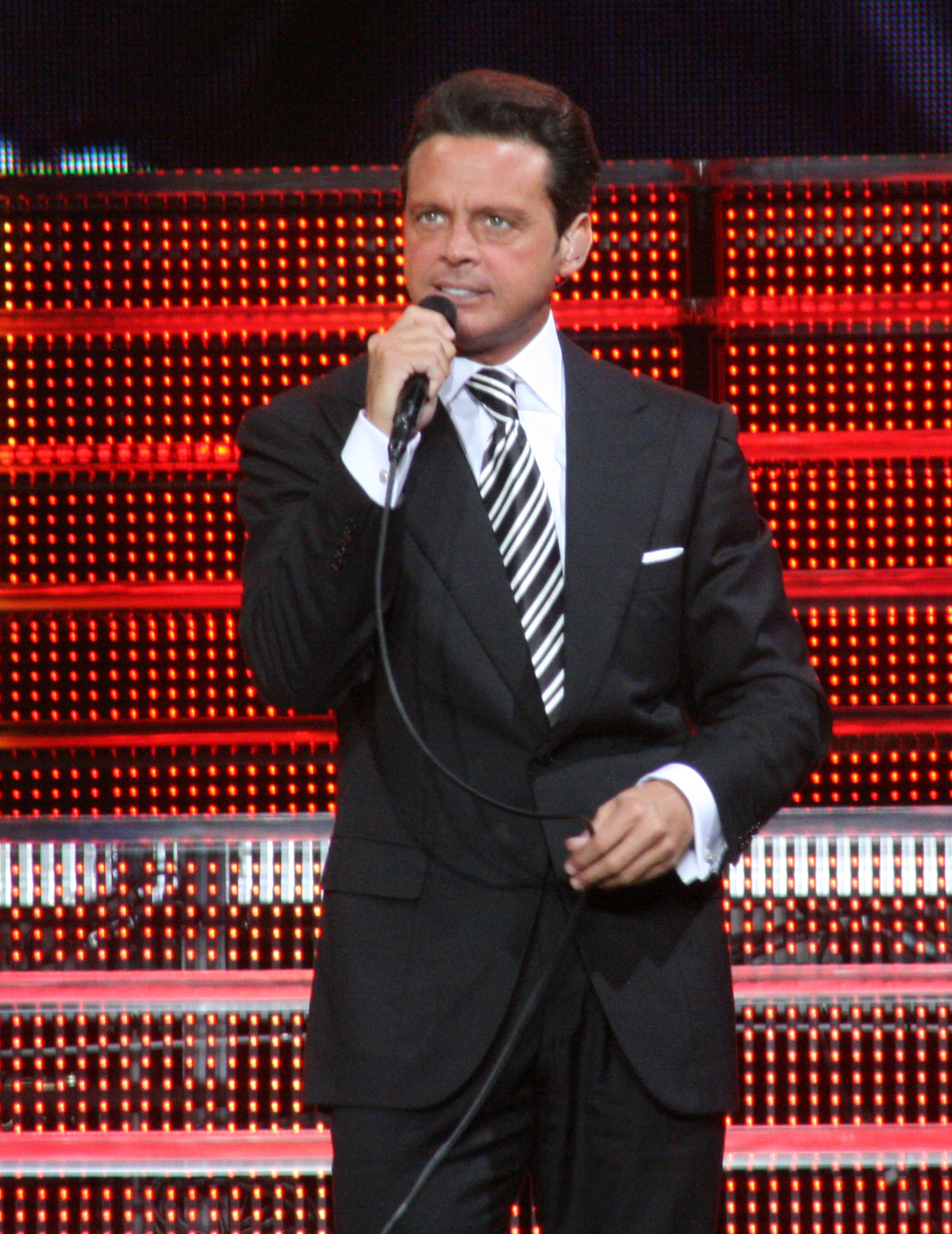
Luis Miguel, winner for Best Male TV-Singer.

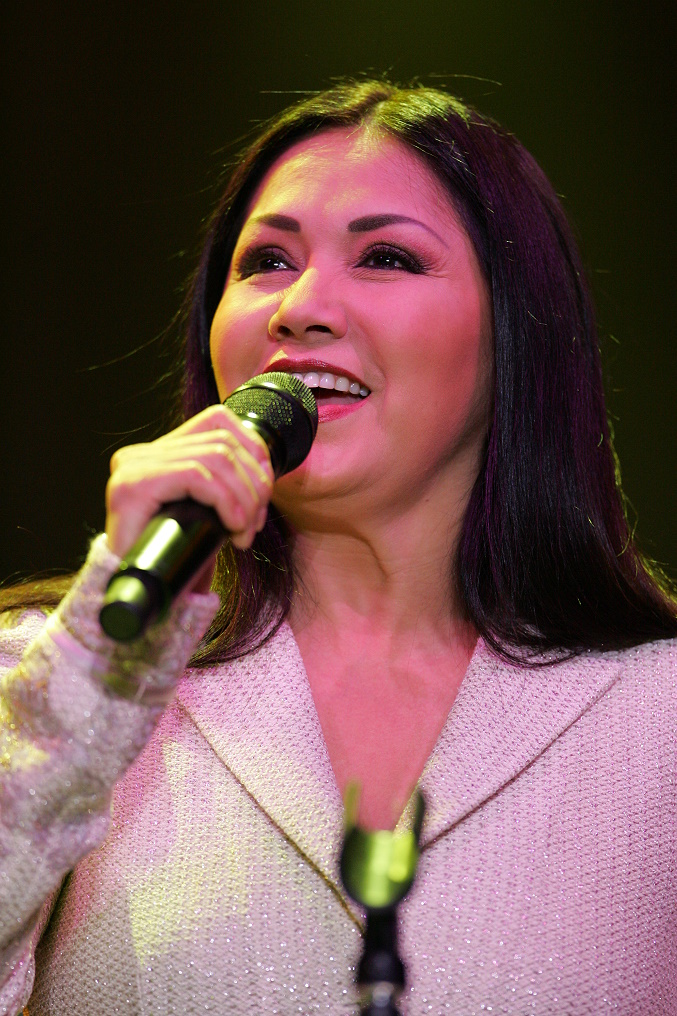
Ana Gabriel, winner for Best Female Singer Revelation.

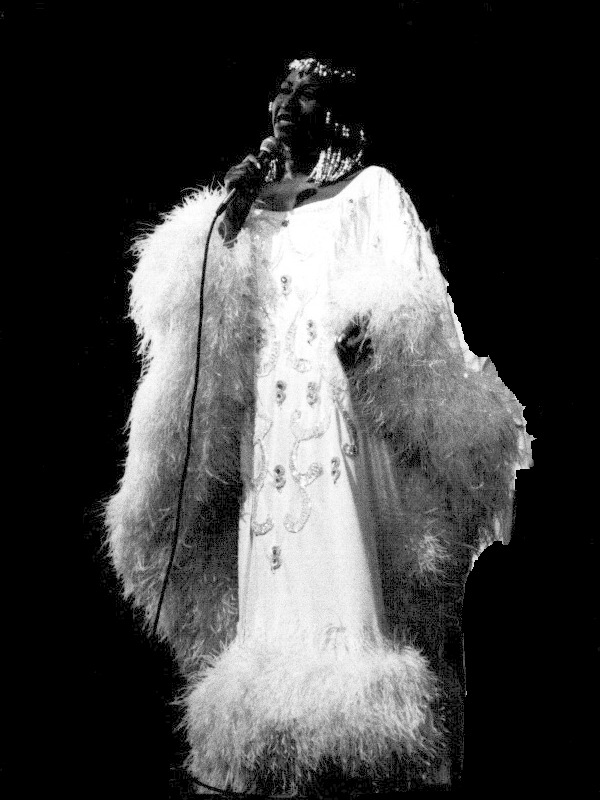
Celia Cruz, awarded with a Special Award for No.1 Singer of Tropical Music.

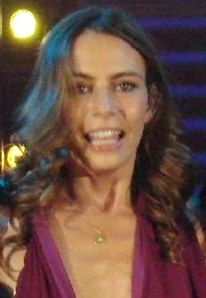
Sasha, awarded with a Special Award for Musical Debut.

== Summary of awards and nominations ==
Telenovela	Nominations	Awards
Victoria	10	1
Quinceañera	8	8
Senda de gloria	8	4
Cómo duele callar	5	0
Rosa salvaje	3	2
Tal como somos	2	1
El precio de la fama	1	0
Pobre señorita Limantour	1	0

== Winners and nominees ==
=== Telenovelas ===
Best Telenovela	Best Production
Quinceañera; Senda de gloria; Victoria	Ernesto Alonso, Pablo García Sainz and Carlos Sotomayor – Senda de gloria
Best Actress	Best Actor
Verónica Castro – Rosa salvaje; Julieta Rosen – Senda de gloria; Victoria Ruffo – Victoria	Eduardo Yáñez – Senda de gloria; Guillermo Capetillo – Rosa salvaje; Juan Ferrara – Victoria
Best Antagonist Actress	Best Antagonist Actor
Laura Zapata – Rosa salvaje; Isabela Corona – Victoria; Úrsula Prats – Pobre señorita Limantour	Sebastián Ligarde – Quinceañera; Enrique Álvarez Félix – Tal como somos; Joaquín Cordero – Cómo duele callar
Best Experienced Actress	Best Experienced Actor
Rosario Gálvez – Victoria; Blanca Sánchez – Senda de gloria; Elsa Cárdenas – El precio de la fama	Ernesto Gómez Cruz – Tal como somos; Ignacio López Tarso – Senda de gloria; Miguel Manzano – Victoria
Best Young Lead Actress	Best Young Lead Actor
Adela Noriega – Quinceañera; Gabriela Ruffo – Victoria; Graciela Mauri – Cómo duele callar	Ernesto Laguardia – Quinceañera; Edgardo Gazcón – Cómo duele callar; Luis Xavier – Victoria
Best Female Revelation	Best Male Revelation
Thalía – Quinceañera; Cynthia Klitbo – Cómo duele callar; Flor Trujillo – Victoria	Armando Araiza – Quinceañera; Miguel Rodarte – Cómo duele callar; Roberto Vander – Victoria

=== Other Awards ===
Best Debut Actress or Actor	Best Original Story or Adaptation
Nailea Norvind – Quinceañera	René Muñoz – Quinceañera
Best Direction	Best Direction of the Cameras
Raúl Araiza – Senda de gloria	Jesús Acuña Lee – Senda de gloria

=== Comedy and Variety Programs ===
Best Comedy Program	Best Entertainment or Variety Program
Dr. Cándido Pérez	Siempre en domingo
Best Comedy Actress	Best Comedy Actor
María Luisa Alcalá – Dr. Cándido Pérez	Jorge Ortiz de Pinedo – Dr. Cándido Pérez
Best TV Hostess	Best TV Host
Pati Chapoy – México, magia y encuentro	Raúl Velasco – Siempre en domingo
Best Female TV-Singer	Best Male TV-Singer
Rocío Banquells	Luis Miguel
Best Female Singer Revelation	Best Male Singer Revelation
Ana Gabriel	Francisco Xavier
Best Children's Program	Best Child Performance
Chiquilladas	Pierre Angelo – Chiquilladas

=== Special awards ===
- Special Recognition to the Pioneers of Telenovelas: Jesús Gómez Obregón, Fernanda Villeli and Silvia Derbez
- Journalistic Career: Leopoldo Murras
- Musical Career: Lola Beltrán
- No.1 Singer of Tropical Music: Celia Cruz
- Musical Debut: Sasha Sokol
- International Revelation: Karina
- Best Musical-Vocal Band: Timbiriche
- Most Successful Night Club Show of 1987: Polo Polo
