= Senda de gloria =

Television series

- Genre: Telenovela
- Created by: Fausto Zerón Medina
- Written by: Miguel Sabido; Eduardo Lizalde
- Directed by: Raúl Araiza
- Starring: Eduardo Yáñez; Julieta Rosen; Ignacio López Tarso; Blanca Sánchez; Roxana Chávez; Anabel Ferreira; Roberto Vander
- Opening theme: Instrumental by Osni Cassab
- Country of origin: Mexico
- Original language: Spanish
- No. of episodes: 135

Production
- Executive producer: Ernesto Alonso
- Production locations: Mexico City, Mexico
- Cinematography: Jesús Acuña Lee
- Running time: 21-22 minutes
- Production company: Televisa

Original release
- Network: Canal de las Estrellas
- Release: March 26 – October 2, 1987

Related
- El padre Gallo; Quinceañera

Senda de gloria (English title: Path to Glory) is a Mexican telenovela produced by Ernesto Alonso for Televisa in 1987. The telenovela recreates historical events in Mexico between 1916 and 1939. It starred Eduardo Yáñez, Julieta Rosen, Ignacio López Tarso, Blanca Sánchez, Roxana Chávez and Anabel Ferreira.

== Plot ==
The story begins in 1916, with the Mexican Revolution seemingly coming to an end. General Eduardo Álvarez and his family are waiting for the train at the station and there they meet Manuel Fortuna, a young railroad employee who will come to have a significant role in their lives. Manuel falls in love with Andrea, the eldest daughter of the general, but a great gulf separates them. Additionally, Manuel lives with Mercedes, a woman who adores him and therefore he does not want to hurt her.

== Cast ==
- Eduardo Yáñez as Manuel Fortuna
- Julieta Rosen as Andrea Álvarez
- Ignacio López Tarso as General Eduardo Álvarez
- Blanca Sánchez as Fernanda Álvarez
- Roxana Chávez as Julieta Álvarez
- Anabel Ferreira as Nora Álvarez
- Roberto Vander as James Van Hallen
- José Alonso as Héctor Álvarez
- Raúl Araiza as Father Antonio Álvarez
- Abel Salazar as General Rosario Talamantes
- Rosita Arenas as Mercedes
- Delia Magaña as Nana Nacha
- Arturo Vázquez as Abundio
- Ramón Menéndez as Venustiano Carranza
- Manuel Ojeda as Emiliano Zapata
- Guillermo Gil as Pancho Villa
- Salvador Sánchez as Adolfo de la Huerta
- Manuel López Ochoa as Plutarco Elías Calles
- Aarón Hernán as Pascual Ortiz Rubio
- Bruno Rey as Álvaro Obregón
- Rodrigo de la Mora as Emilio Portes Gil
- Julio Monterde as Abelardo L. Rodríguez
- Héctor Sáez as José Vasconcelos
- Arturo Beristáin as Lázaro Cárdenas
- Ángel Aragón as Felipe Ángeles
- Antonio Medellín as Luis N. Morones
- Norma Lazareno as Angelina Beloff
- Miguel Palmer as Tomás Garrido Canabal
- Alejandro Ruiz as José León Toral
- Jorge Fegán as Luis Cabrera
- Rodolfo Solís as Jesús Guajardo
- César Castro as Miguel Alessio Robles
- Alfredo Gutiérrez as Pablo González
- Jorge Victoria as Ing. Ignacio Bonillas
- Raúl Valerio as Manuel Aguirre Berlanga
- Sergio Zuani as Don Félix Díaz
- Marco Muñoz as Renato Álvarez
- Alberto Gavira as Don Lupe
- Javier Ruán as Fermín del Río
- Roberto D'Amico as General Francisco R. Serrano
- Ricardo de Pascual as Julio Torri
- Juan José Gurrola as Diego Rivera
- Eduardo Alcaraz as Obispo Mora y del Río
- Ricardo Kleinbaum as Obispo Pascual Díaz
- Héctor Flores as Father Miguel Agustín Pro
- Gilberto Román as Víctor Iriarte
- Jorge Reynoso as Coronel Cristero
- Carlos González as Claudio Fox
- Armando Araiza as Gilberto
- Claudio Brook
- Eric del Castillo

== Awards and nominations ==
Year	Award	Category	Nominee	Result
1988	6th TVyNovelas Awards	Best Telenovela	Ernesto Alonso	Nominated
1988	6th TVyNovelas Awards	Best Actress	Julieta Rosen	Nominated
1988	6th TVyNovelas Awards	Best Actor	Eduardo Yáñez	Won
1988	6th TVyNovelas Awards	Best Experienced Actress	Blanca Sánchez	Nominated
1988	6th TVyNovelas Awards	Best Experienced Actor	Ignacio López Tarso	Nominated
1988	6th TVyNovelas Awards	Best Direction	Raúl Araiza	Won
1988	6th TVyNovelas Awards	Best Direction of the Cameras	Jesús Acuña Lee	Won
1988	6th TVyNovelas Awards	Best Production	Ernesto Alonso; Pablo García Sainz; Carlos Sotomayor	Won
1988	Latin ACE Awards	Best Scenic Program	Senda de gloria	Won
1988	Latin ACE Awards	Best Supporting Actor	Arturo Beristáin	Won
