= Papá a toda madre =

Mexican telenovela

- Genre: Telenovela
- Created by: Pedro Armando Rodríguez
- Written by: Luis Gamboa; Alejandra Romero; Humberto Robles; Héctor Valdés
- Story by: Montserrat Gómez
- Directed by: Benjamín Cann; Rodrigo Zaunbos
- Starring: Sebastián Rulli; Maite Perroni; Mark Tacher; Juan Carlos Barreto; Sergio Mur; Raúl Araiza
- Theme music composer: Fonseca
- Opening theme: "Cuando llego a casa" by Fonseca
- Country of origin: Mexico
- Original language: Spanish
- No. of seasons: 1
- No. of episodes: 103

Production
- Executive producer: Eduardo Meza
- Producers: Carolina Gallastegui; María Alba Espinosa
- Cinematography: Diego Lascurain; Carlos Ferreira
- Editors: Pablo Peralta; Juan Carlos Silva
- Camera setup: Multi-camera
- Production company: Televisa

Original release
- Network: Las Estrellas
- Release: 22 October 2017 – 11 March 2018

Related
- Pa' quererte

Papá a toda madre is a Mexican comedy telenovela that premiered on Las Estrellas on 22 October 2017, and concluded on 11 March 2018. Produced for Televisa by Eduardo Meza. The telenovela revolves around four dads of different ages, who have a radical change in their lives by assuming their role as parents.

It stars Sebastián Rulli as Mauricio—a partier and womanizer who suddenly has to assume his role as father—alongside Maite Perroni, Mark Tacher, Juan Carlos Barreto, Sergio Mur, and Raúl Araiza.

== Plot ==
The telenovela revolves around four dads of different ages and a gay couple (Andrés Zuno), (Raúl Coronado), who have a radical change in their lives by assuming their role as parents; Mauricio López-Garza (Sebastián Rulli) is a handsome and charming man who works in a children's toy store, but who—paradoxically—does not like children, all he does is waste money and enjoy the good life. Mauricio is accustomed to having others solve his problems; so his toy company is managed by Fabián Carbajal (Mark Tacher), his best friend since childhood. After a while Mauricio's company becomes bankrupt and his salary decreases, so decides to marry the daughter of an investor, who has an economic position and that can get him out of all his financial problems. The day of Mauricio's wedding a little girl, Anifer (Regina Graniewicz), interrupts the wedding, Claiming that Mauricio is her father. After the scandal, Mauricio's wedding is suspended. He must now take care of his daughter, but the problems soon begin when he is forced to pay all his debts and his company goes bankrupt. Because of this Mauricio is forced to leave his lavish lifestyle and move to a barrio. There he becomes a neighbor to many of the people that were left out of a job because his factory “Logatoys”. In his new home with his daughter, Mauricio must live with his new neighbors and Renée (Maite Perroni), a young and beautiful engineer who used to work at his factory. Renée does not believe in love, but falls in love with him and decides to help him with his daughter and turn him into a good man.

On the other hand, they are Jorge Turrubiates (Sergio Mur), a strict and conservative lawyer, who to the divorce of his wife is left in charge of his two children who, to their bad luck, are entering the full age of adolescence. Toño Barrientos (Raúl Araiza), a computer engineer who has exchanged roles with his wife, who will now be the provider of the home giving him the role of "master of home", leaving him in the care of his three children. Nerón Machuca (Juan Carlos Barreto), a widower who, despite believing that his father's labors are finished—his children are already older—and for the love of a woman twenty years his junior, returns to be the father of a beautiful baby whom they often confuse with his granddaughter.

== Cast and characters ==
=== Main characters ===
- Sebastián Rulli as Mauricio López-Garza, a party man and womanizer who suddenly has to assume his role as father.
- Maite Perroni as Renée Sánchez Moreno, a beautiful and young university student and mechatronic engineering that through various unusual circumstances ends up helping Mauricio in everything related to his daughter.
- Mark Tacher as Fabián Carvajal, is Mauricio's best friend since childhood.
- Juan Carlos Barreto as Nerón Machuca, a car mechanic, who after being a father decides to have another child again.
- Sergio Mur as Jorge Turrubiates, a lawyer who works for Logatoys, is a religious and strict man. After his wife leaves him, he assumes the role of householder.
- Raúl Araiza as Toño Barrientos, a systems engineer, who after losing his job assumed his role as a househusband.

=== Recurring characters ===
- Verónica Jaspeado as Verónica Valencia, is the wife of Toño, after losing her job in Logatoys she decides to look for a new job and leave her husband in charge of her children.
- Verónica Montes as Chiquinquirá Braun, is a young Venezuelan woman known for marketing and advertising videos on the internet.
- Ana La Salvia as Dulce Goyeneche, she is a lawyer, Jorge's wife, after seeing that her marriage did not work she decides to leave the house and leave her husband in charge of her children.
- Agustín Arana as Sebastián, he is one of Mauricio's party friends.
- Franklin Virgüez as Leopoldo Falcón, is one of the majority partners of Mauricio in Logatoys.
- Sergio Klainer as Noel
- Michelle González as Flor Ivone, she is a beautiful young model, wife of Nerón.
- Andrés Zuno as Rafael Restrepo, is a veterinarian and husband of Rodrigo.
- Raúl Coronado as Rodrigo Conde, he is the main police officer who lives in the private one where he lives with his husband Rafael.
- Bárbara López as María Cruz, she is Anifer's mother, who apparently died.
- Estefanía Ahumada as Miranda, she is the daughter of a businessman who was going to invest in Logatoys, when she meets Mauricio she decides to marry him, until the day of their wedding when she discovers that Mauricio had a daughter.
- Ricardo Baranda as Lupe, he is a young doctor, who has been in love with Renée all his life.
- Bárbara Torres as Gladys, she is the secretary of Mauricio in Logatoys.
- Carlos Speitzer as Cicerón Machuca, Nerón son's.
- Regina Graniewicz as Anifer, Mauricio daughter's.
- Karyme Hernández as Valentina, she is a rebellious young woman who, after seeing her parents separated, takes over the household chores.
- Marcelo Bacerló as Samuel Turrubiates, Jorge son's.
- Yankel Stevan as Baldo Turrubiates, Jorge son's.
- Fernanda Urdapilleta as Lili Turrubiates, Jorge daughter's.
- Victoria Viera as Tania Barrientos, Toño daughter's.
- Pato de la Garza as Ernesto Barrientos, Toño son's.
- Simón Goncalves as Fidelito, Toño son's.
- Sandra Beltrán as Wilma Hernández, she is Renée's teacher and advisor at the university.
- Cruz Rendel as Pablo Urquiza, is an undocumented young Guatemalan who works with Nerón.
- Nando Estevané as Padre Cutberto
- Emmanuel Okaury as Sócrates Machuca, Nerón son's.
- Mercedes Vaughan as Queta, she is a false nun who tries to kidnap Anifer to sell her to a couple.
- Roberto Sen as Aurelio, is Jorge's godfather, who chantega after Jorge discovers a secret of him and his dad.
- Thelma Dorantes as Irene, she is Jorge's godmother.
- Cecilia Constantino as Sonia Serrano
- Martín Brek as Onofre
- Archie Balardi as Police
- Lalo Zayas as Víctor
- Gwendolyn Amador as Tina
- Raquel Pankowsky as Esperanza Félix, Toño's mother, Vero's mother-in-law, grandmother of Tania, Neto and Fidelito.

=== Guest appearances ===
- Pablo Cruz Guerrero as Alejandro Villaseñor, is an engineer in mechatronics, who falls in love with Renée and decides to marry her, until the day of his wedding Renee rejects him.
- Leticia Perdigón as Catalina Moreno, Renée's mother.
- Eugenia Cauduro as Aurora Silvetti de López-Garza, Mauricio's mother.
- Marisol del Olmo as Yuriria Bullegoyri, Jorge's other wife.
- Eugenio Montessoro as Bosco López-Garza, Mauricio's father.

== Production ==
The start of production of the telenovela was confirmed on August 17, 2017, but previously production began on August 14, 2017. The telenovelas is created by Pedro Armando Rodríguez and Montserrat Gómez García, and written by Alejandra Romero, Humberto Robles and Héctor Valdés, and directed by Benjamín Cann and Rodrigo Zaunbos.

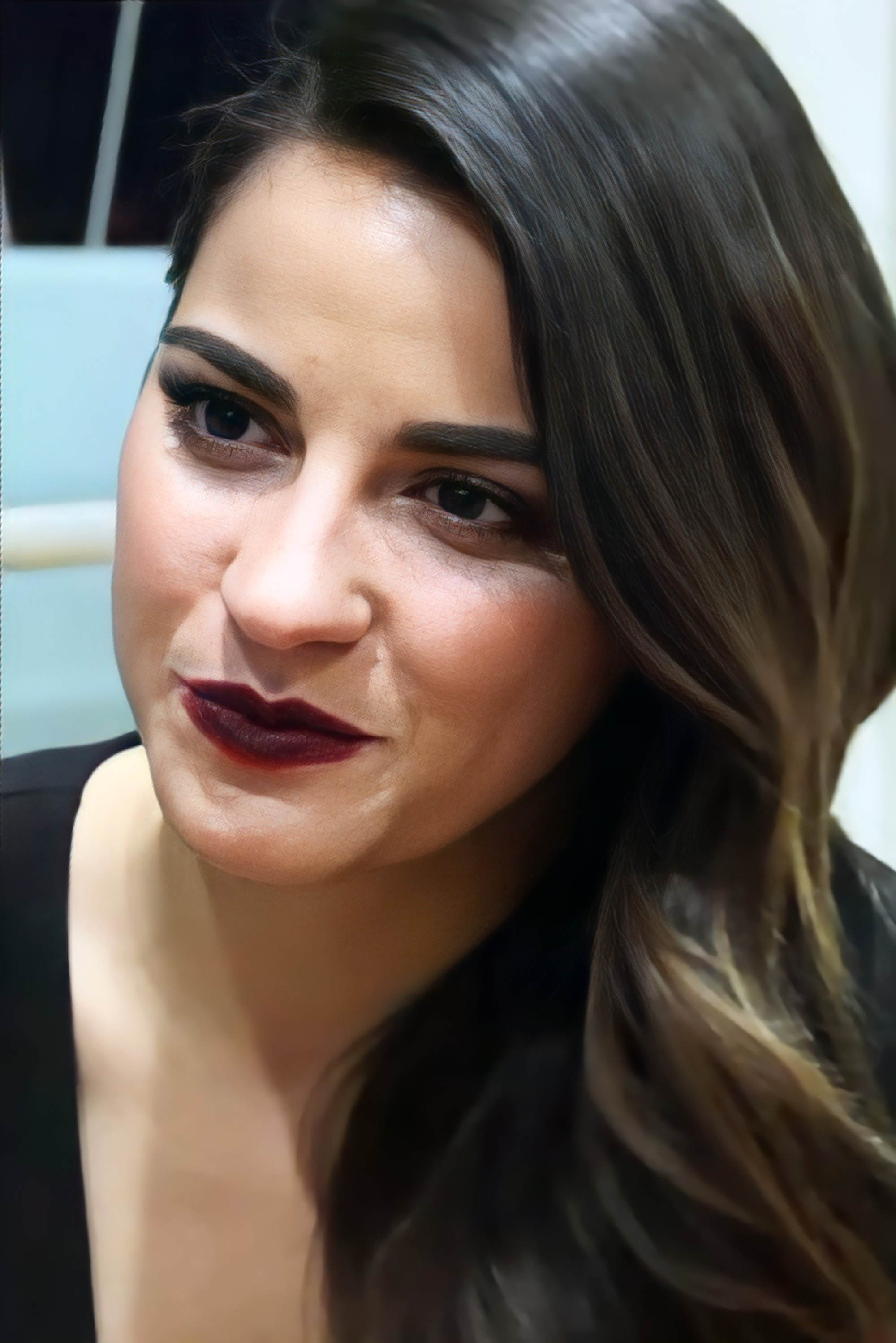
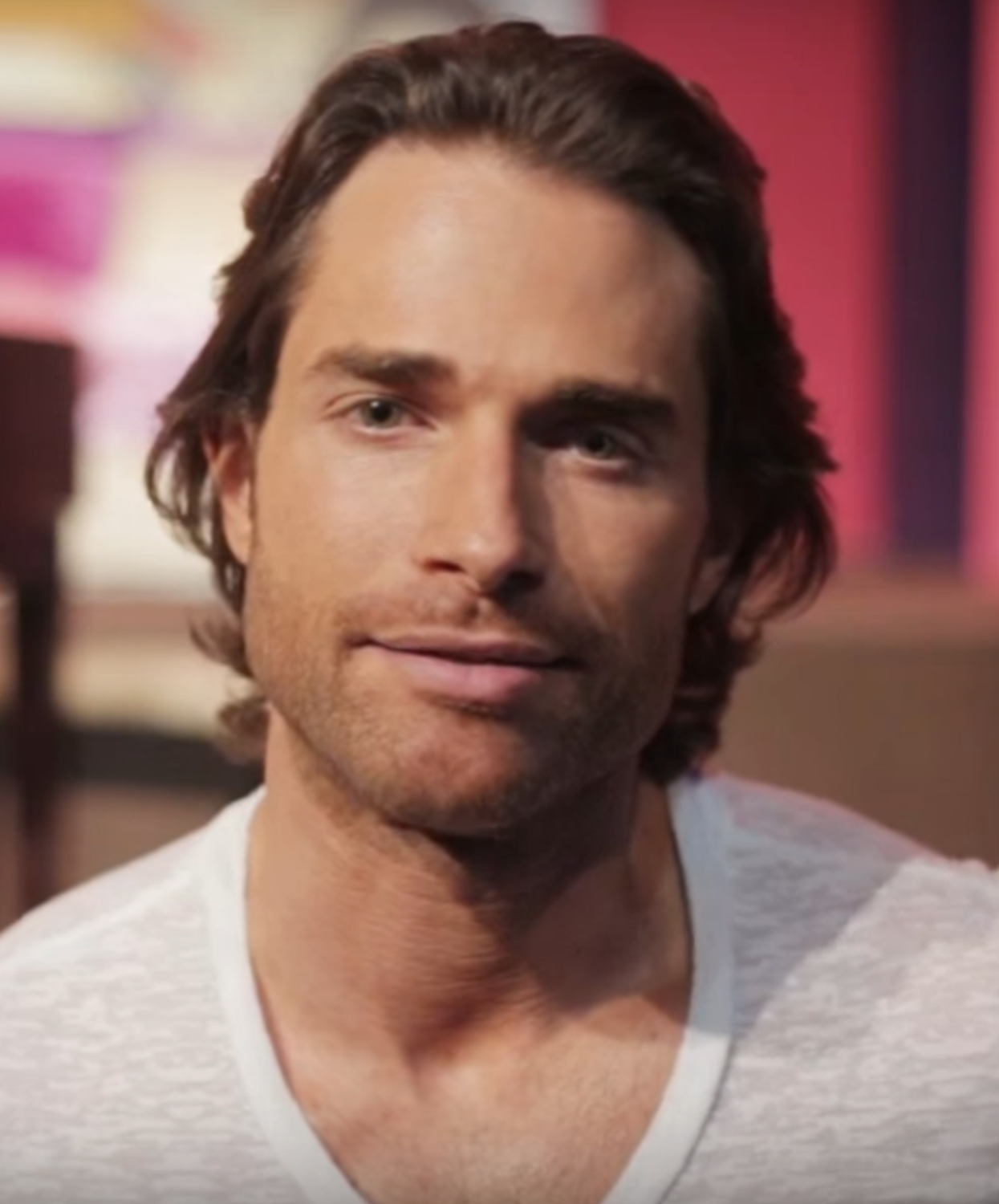
Maite Perroni and Sebastián Rulli as main characters

The telenovela trailer was released in May 2017, during Univision's upfront for the 2017-2018 television season. Where only Sebastián Rulli and Lara Campos are shown, Campos previously appeared in La doble vida de Estela Carrillo. On October 19, 2017, it was confirmed that the telenovela would be the first telenovela of Televisa, in showing a gay couple looking to form a home.

=== Casting ===
On August 9, 2017, it was confirmed that Sebastián Rulli and Maite Perroni would be the protagonists of the telenovela. On August 11, 2017, was confirmed to Regina Graniewicz as Anifer. On August 30, 2017, Mark Tacher was confirmed as a villain of the history. The rest of the protagonists are formed by Sergio Mur, who makes his debut on Televisa, after being on Telemundo. Raúl Araiza who returns to the television after being absent and Juan Carlos Barreto.

== Controversy ==
From left to right: Andrés Zuno and Raúl Coronado in their respective roles. Both main characters of the controversy generated.

The company CitizenGo, launched through its website a request that called for the telenovela to be taken off the air, saying that Televisa "wants to normalize homosexuality in society". Due to this controversy, People en Español announced the news and created a survey for readers to vote if they agree or disagree with the proposal of CitizenGo. The petition to sign for the telenovela to be taken out of the air, says the following:

Sincerely. Emilio Azcárraga Jean, president of Televisa

I write with concern about the telenovela 'Papá a toda madre'.

I am concerned that they intend to normalize homosexuality in Mexico against the majority feeling of citizenship and its audience.

You know very well the pedagogical power of your telenovelas.

I do not want anyone to be discriminated against socially, at work or politically because of their sexual orientation. But presenting a homosexual couple as an attractive model is different. Is this the new corporate strategy of Televisa?

They defrauded me. I thought that Televisa aspired to build a better society, to strengthen the family as the basic cell of Mexican society. I thought it was true that they affirm that their values are credibility, honesty and professionalism ...

Unfortunately I was wrong. Of course, I will not see the controversial telenovela. But neither his channel. I distrust your ethical criteria and there are other alternatives for leisure.

On November 15, 2017 Televisa showed the first gay kiss in their telenovelas, although it has already been shown twice in the series Como dice el dicho, something that generated a lot of controversy and that several media have tried to sense. Previously this topic had been played, a scene was filmed in the telenovela Los exitosos Pérez but due to the controversy generated, that scene was censored.

== Ratings ==
=== Mexico ratings ===
Timeslot (CT)	Episodes	First aired		Last aired	
Timeslot (CT)	Episodes	Date	Premiere (millions)	Date	Finale (millions)
Mon–Fri 8:30pm	103	22 October 2017	3.9	11 March 2018	3.0

=== U.S. ratings ===
Timeslot (ET)	Episodes	First aired		Last aired	
Timeslot (ET)	Episodes	Date	Premiere (millions)	Date	Finale (millions)
Mon–Fri 9pm/8c	100	15 January 2018	1.73	11 June 2018	1.76

== Awards and nominations ==
Year	Award	Category	Nominated	Result	Refs
2018	36th TVyNovelas Awards Mexico	Best Telenovela of the Year	Eduardo Meza	Nominated	
2018	36th TVyNovelas Awards Mexico	Best Actress	Maite Perroni	Won	
2018	36th TVyNovelas Awards Mexico	Best Actor	Sebastián Rulli	Won	
2018	36th TVyNovelas Awards Mexico	Best Leading Actress	Raquel Pankowsky	Nominated	
2018	36th TVyNovelas Awards Mexico	Best Leading Actor	Juan Carlos Barreto	Won	
2018	36th TVyNovelas Awards Mexico	Best Co-lead Actress	Verónica Jaspeado	Nominated	
2018	36th TVyNovelas Awards Mexico	Best Co-lead Actor	Raúl Araiza	Nominated	
2018	36th TVyNovelas Awards Mexico	Best Supporting Actress	Michelle González	Nominated	
2018	36th TVyNovelas Awards Mexico	Best Supporting Actor	Sergio Mur	Won	
2018	36th TVyNovelas Awards Mexico	Best Young Lead Actress	Fernanda Urdapilleta	Nominated	
2018	36th TVyNovelas Awards Mexico	Best Direction	Benjamín Cann, Rodrigo G. H. Zaunbos	Nominated	
2018	36th TVyNovelas Awards Mexico	Best Direction of the Camaras	Manuel Barajas, Alejandro Álvarez	Nominated	
2018	36th TVyNovelas Awards Mexico	Best Cast	Papá a toda madre	Nominated	
2019	GLAAD Media Award	Outstanding Scripted Television Series (Spanish-Language)	Papá a toda madre	Nominated	
