= TVyNovelas Award for Best Direction of the Cameras =

Mexican television award

- Awarded for: Best director of cameras (cinematographer)
- First award: 1988; Jesús Acuña Lee; Senda de gloria
- Currently held by: 2020; Vivián Sánchez Ross; La usurpadora

== Winners and nominees ==
=== 1980s ===
Winner	Nominated
6th TVyNovelas Awards
	Jesús Acuña Lee for Senda de gloria
7th TVyNovelas Awards
	Gabriel Vázquez Bulman for El pecado de Oyuki

=== 1990s ===
Winner	Nominated
8th TVyNovelas Awards
	Alejandro Frutos for Dulce Desafio and Mi segunda madre
9th TVyNovelas Awards
	Jesús Acuña Lee for Yo compro esa mujer
10th TVyNovelas Awards
	Carlos Guerra for Cadenas de amargura
11th TVyNovelas Awards
	Patty Juárez for Baila conmigo
~~1994~~
13th TVyNovelas Awards
	Jesús Acuña Lee and Carlos Guerra for El vuelo del águila
14th TVyNovelas Awards
	Alejandro Frutos and Isabel Basurto for Lazos de amor
15th TVyNovelas Awards
	Jesús Acuña Lee and Carlos Guerra for La antorcha encendida
16th TVyNovelas Awards
	Jesús Nájera for Esmeralda
17th TVyNovelas Awards
	Jesús Nájera and Manuel Barajas for La usurpadora

=== 2000s ===
Winner	Nominated
~~2000~~
19th TVyNovelas Awards
Carlos Sánchez Ross and Vivian Sánchez Ross for Primer amor... a mil por hora	
~~2002 to 2008~~
27th TVyNovelas Awards
Héctor Vázquez and Manuel Barajas for Alma de hierro	Héctor Márquez and Bernardo Nájera for Alma de hierro; Claudio Lara and Armando Zafra for Al diablo con los guapos; Manuel Barajas and Jesús Acuña Lee for Fuego en la sangre

=== 2010s ===
Winner	Nominated
28th TVyNovelas Awards
Lino Gama Esquinca for Sortilegio	Armando Zafra for Un gancho al corazón; Luis Monroy for Hasta que el dinero nos separe
~~2011 to 2015~~
34th TVyNovelas Awards
Alejandro Frutos Maza and Jorge Amaya Rodríguez for A que no me dejas	Daniel Ferrer and Alejandro Álvarez for Antes muerta que Lichita; Marco Vinicio for La sombra del pasado; Bernardo Nájera and Víctor Soto for La vecina; Vivian Sánchez for Muchacha italiana viene a casarse
35th TVyNovelas Awards
Armando Zafra and Luis Rodríguez for La candidata	Marco Vinicio, Óscar Morales and Bernardo Nájera for Corazón que miente; Vivián Sánchez Ross, Manuel Barajas and Daniel Ferrer for El hotel de los secretos; Walter Doehner and Luis Rodríguez for Sin rastro de ti; Manuel Barajas and Armando Zafra for Tres veces Ana
36th TVyNovelas Awards
Armando Zafra and Luis Rodríguez for Caer en tentación	Manuel Barajas and Alejandro Álvarez for La doble vida de Estela Carrillo; Alejandro Frutos for Me declaro culpable; Mauricio Manzano and Gilberto Macín for Mi marido tiene familia; Manuel Barajas and Alejandro Álvarez for Papá a toda madre
37th TVyNovelas Awards
Mauricio Manzano and Martha Montufar for Mi marido tiene familia	Gabriel Vazquez Bulman and Jesús Najera for Hijas de la luna; Walter Dohener, Victor Herrera, and Luis Rodriguez for La jefa del campeón; Vivian Sánchez Ross and Daniel Ferrer for Like; Bernardo Najera and Mauricio Manzano for Por amar sin ley

=== 2020s ===
Winner	Nominated
38th TVyNovelas Awards
Vivián Sánchez Ross for La usurpadora	Daniel Ferrer and Alfonso Mendoza for Cita a ciegas; Armando Zafra and Luis Rodríguez for Cuna de lobos; Bernardo Nájera for Médicos; Víctor Soto and Adrián Frutos for Ringo; Manuel Barajas, Alejandro Frutos, and Diego Tenorio for Vencer el miedo

== Records ==
- Most awarded director: Jesús Acuña Lee, 4 times.
- Most awarded director (ever winner): Carlos Guerra, 3 times.
- Most nominated director: Jesús Acuña Lee with 5 nominations.
- Most nominated director without a win: Daniel Ferrer with 2 nominations.
- Directors winning after short time: Armando Zafra and Luis Rodríguez by (La candidata, 2017) and (Caer en tentación, 2018), 2 consecutive years.
- Director winning after long time: Jesús Acuña Lee by (Senda de gloria, 1988) and (Yo compro esa mujer, 1991), 4 years difference.
