= La fiera (Mexican TV series) =

- Guillermo Capetillo and Victoria Ruffo in the soap opera
- Genre: Telenovela
- Created by: Inés Rodena
- Written by: Luis Reyes de la Maza; Vivian Pestalozzi
- Directed by: Pedro Damián
- Starring: Victoria Ruffo; Guillermo Capetillo; Rocío Banquells; Angélica Aragón; Isabela Corona; Lupita Lara
- Opening theme: Príncipe Azul by Agustín Pantoja
- Ending theme: Amor más grande by Nancy Toro
- Country of origin: Mexico
- Original language: Spanish
- No. of episodes: 230

Production
- Executive producer: Valentín Pimstein
- Cinematography: José Ambris; Manuel Ruiz Esparza
- Running time: 21-22 minutes

Original release
- Network: Canal de las Estrellas
- Release: December 26, 1983 – November 9, 1984

Related
- La gata (1970); Rosa salvaje (1987); Cara sucia (1992); La gata (2014)

La Fiera (English title: The Wild One) is a Mexican telenovela produced by Valentín Pimstein for Televisa in 1983.

Victoria Ruffo and Guillermo Capetillo star as the protagonists, while Rocío Banquells, Carlos Cámara, Nuria Bages and Raymundo Capetillo star as the antagonists.

== Plot ==
Natalie (Victoria Ruffo), a poor but beautiful girl of the neighborhood, arrives to conquer the heart of Víctor Alfonso (Guillermo Capetillo), a rich young man and of good family who has been his friend since childhood. However, both have to face opposition from the society, the parents of Victor Alfonso, who despise Natalie for being poor and have always wanted their son to marry Brenda (Rocío Banquells), a beautiful and sophisticated girl.

== Cast ==
- Victoria Ruffo as Natalie Ramírez "La Fiera"
- Guillermo Capetillo as Victor Alfonso Martínez Bustamante
- Rocío Banquells as Brenda del Villar
- Angélica Aragón as Elvia La Costeña
- Isabela Corona as Elodia
- Lupita Lara as Elena Martínez Bustamante (#1)
- Nuria Bages as Elena Martínez Bustamante (#2)
- Carlos Cámara as Lorenzo Martínez Bustamante
- Leonardo Daniel as Miguel Martínez Bustamante
- Luis Daniel Rivera as Manuel Pérez Brito "Papillón"/Don Julio
- Julieta Bracho as Regina
- Juan Antonio Edwards as El Chamuco
- Javier Marc as Zorba El Griego
- Beatriz Moreno as Lina
- América Gabriel as Tamara
- Óscar Bonfiglio as Frankie
- Juan Verduzco as Marín
- Alfredo Alegría as Lupito #1
- Odiseo Bichir as Lupito #2
- Enrique Gilabert as Lic. Meléndez /Lic. Castillo
- Edith González as Julie Herrera
- Gabriela Ruffo as Carmela
- Carlos Rotzinger as José Luis Ascarate
- Alberto Inzua as Don Vincent Herrera
- Roxana Saucedo as Lourdes Millan Lulú
- Servando Manzetti as Pedro
- Aurora Clavel as Sor Trinidad
- Ernesto Laguardia as Raúl the blind
- Nadia Haro Oliva as Elisa Del Vivar
- Miguel Ángel Ferriz as Rogelio Miranda
- Raymundo Capetillo as Marcial Urquiza
- Maricruz Nájera as Angelina
- Lucianne Silva as Ramona
- Fernando Borges as Edmundo Gascón
- Eduardo Kastell as Receptionist
- Claudia Ramírez as Saleswoman
- Julieta Rosen as Nurse
- Christopher Lago as Alfonsito
- Óscar Sánchez as Mayordomo

== Awards ==
| Year | Award | Category | Nominee | Result |
|---|---|---|---|---|
| 1985 | 3rd TVyNovelas Awards | Best Young Lead Actress | Victoria Ruffo | Won |
| 1985 | 3rd TVyNovelas Awards | Best Young Lead Actor | Guillermo Capetillo | Won |
