= Victoria Ruffo =

Mexican actress (born 1962)

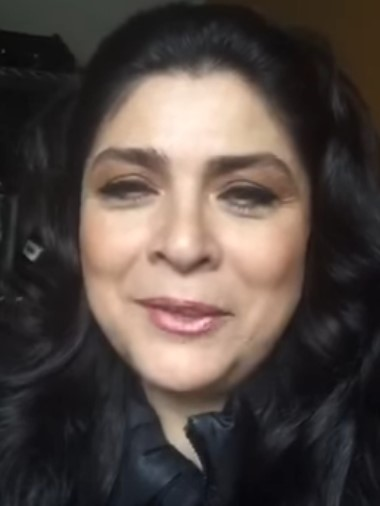
- Born: María Victoria Eugenia Guadalupe Martínez del Río Moreno-Ruffo; May 31, 1962 (age 64); Mexico City, Mexico
- Other names: Vicky; Pecas; Reina de las Telenovelas
- Occupations: Actress, voice actress
- Years active: 1979–present
- Spouses: Eugenio Derbez (m. 1992; div. 1997) Omar Fayad (m. 2001)
- Children: 3, including José Eduardo Derbez
- Website: victoriaruffoweb.com

María Victoria Eugenia Guadalupe Martínez del Río Moreno-Ruffo (born May 31, 1962) better known as Victoria Ruffo is a Mexican actress notable for her roles in telenovelas.

== Biography ==
=== 1980s ===
Ruffo began her acting career in 1980, starring in supporting roles in telenovela Conflictos de un Médico under the direction of Ernesto Alonso and continued her career acting in Al Rojo vivo.

In 1983, Valentín Pimsteín gave her the opportunity to star as the protagonist of La fiera as Natalia Ramirez along with Guillermo Capetillo.

In 1985, she starred in Carlos Téllez's telenovela Juana Iris, alongside Valentín Trujillo and her sister, Gabriela Ruffo.

In 1987, she worked in Ernesto Alonso's telenovela Victoria.

In 1989, Valentín Pimstein offered her the main role in telenovela Simplemente María.

=== 1990s ===
In 1993, she was the protagonist of Capricho, a telenovela by Carlos Sotomayor as Cristina Aranda.

In 1995, she was the protagonist of Pobre niña rica, a telenovela by Enrique Segoviano as Consuelo Villagrán.

In 1998, she starred in telenovela Vivo por Elena as Elena Carvajal.

=== 2000s ===
In 2000, she starred in Salvador Mejía's Abrazame muy fuerte alongside Aracely Arámbula.

2005 marked her comeback in the critically acclaimed telenovela La madrastra, which she starred in with César Évora.

After La madrastra, she performed duties as the First Lady of Pachuca, with her husband acting as mayor, while continuing to star in the telenovelas.

In 2007, Victoria starred in the Telemundo production Victoria alongside Arturo Peniche and Mauricio Ochmann.

In 2008, she played a leading role in Carlos Moreno's En nombre del amor together with Leticia Calderón, Allisson Lozz and Altaír Jarabo. She played Macarena sister to Leticia Calderón's character, Carlota.

=== 2010s ===
In 2010, she was named one of Latin America's 50 Most Beautiful People.

In mid-2010, she was confirmed to lead in Salvador Mejía Alejandre's telenovela Triunfo del amor, where she played "Victoria", starring alongside Maite Perroni, William Levy, and Diego Oliveira.

After Triunfo del amor, Ruffo focused on her family and doing theater plays—specifically Dulce Pajaro de Juventud. She also went to support the senatorial campaign of her husband Omar, who eventually won a seat in the senate.

In 2012, José Alberto Castro confirmed Ruffo to star in telenovela Corona de lágrimas, alongside José María Torre, Mané de la Parra, Alejandro Nones, and Adriana Louvier—she won the 31st TVyNovelas Awards for Best Lead Actress due to her performance in the latter.

In 2014, she played a leading role in telenovela La malquerida, alongside Ariadne Díaz, Christian Meier, África Zavala, and Arturo Peniche.

In 2016, Salvador Mejia called Ruffo to lead the cast of telenovela Las Amazonas.

In 2019, she was the protagonist of Cita a Ciegas, a comic telenovela where Ruffo made the crossover to the comedy genre. Her role as Maura was well received. It was the first telenovela where she did not cry.

== Personal life ==
Born Maria Eugenia Victoria Martinez del Rio Moreno, Victoria Ruffo is the daughter of Ramón Martínez del Río and Guadalupe Moreno Herrera (often referred to as Doña Guadalupe Moreno). She is the sister of actress and radio host Gabriela Ruffo and producer Marcela Ruffo. In honor of her grandfather: Victoria Ruffo took the surname "Ruffo" from the second surname of her maternal grandfather, José Moreno Ruffo, who was a well-known journalist, playwright and writer. She and Eugenio Derbez have one son José Eduardo Derbez (born 1992). On March 9, 2001, she married Mexican politician Omar Fayad, who was the Governor of Hidalgo.

On August 11, 2004, she gave birth to twins.

== Television roles ==
Title	Year	Role	Notes
Conflictos de un médico	1980	Rosario Reyes	
Al rojo vivo	1980	Pilar Álvarez	
Quiéreme siempre	1981	Julia	
XE-TU	1982	Presenter	Main cast
En busca del paraíso	1982	Grisel	
La fiera	1983	Natalie Ramírez "La fiera"	Lead role
Juana Iris	1985	Juana Iris Madrigal Martínez	Lead role
Victoria	1987–1988	Victoria Martínez Medina	Lead role
Simplemente María	1989–1990	María López	Lead role
Capricho	1993	Cristina Aranda Montaño	Lead role
Pobre niña rica	1995–1996	Consuelo Villagrán García-Mora	Lead role
Mujer, casos de la vida real	1997–2001	Unknown role	3 episodes
Vivo Por Elena	1998	Elena Carvajal	Lead role
Abrázame muy fuerte	2000–2001	Cristina Álvarez Rivas de Rivero	Lead role
La madrastra	2005	María Fernández Acuña	Lead role
Victoria	2007	Victoria Santiesteban de Mendoza	Lead role
En nombre del amor	2008–2009	Macarena Espinoza de los Monteros	Lead role; 66 episodes
Triunfo del amor	2010–2011	Victoria Sandoval	Lead role; 176 episodes
Corona de lágrimas	2012–2023	Refugio Chavero	Lead role; 222 episodes
La malquerida	2014	Cristina Maldonado Reyes de Domínguez	Lead role; 116 episodes
Las amazonas	2016	Inés Huerta	Lead role; 61 episodes
Cita a ciegas	2019	Maura Fuentes de Salazar	Lead role

== Awards and nominations ==
=== TVyNovelas Awards ===
Year	Category	Telenovela	Result
1985	Best Young Lead Actress	La fiera	Won
1988	Best Musical Theme	Victoria	Nominated
1988	Best Lead Actress	Victoria	Nominated
1990	Best Lead Actress	Simplemente María	Nominated
1994	Best Lead Actress	Capricho	Nominated
1999	Best Lead Actress	Vivo por Elena	Nominated
2006	Best Lead Actress	La madrastra	Nominated
2013	Best Lead Actress	Corona de lágrimas	Won

=== Premios Bravo ===
Year	Category	Telenovela	Result
2006	Best First Actress	La madrastra	Won

=== Premios People en Español ===
Year	Category	Telenovela	Result
2009	Best Actress	En nombre del amor	Nominated
2011	Best Supporting Actress	Triunfo del amor	Nominated
