= Zuno =

Zuno is a surname. Notable people with the surname include:

- Andrés Zuno (born 1982), Mexican actor and singer
- María Esther Zuno (1924–1999), wife of Mexican President Luis Echeverría and the first lady of Mexico from 1970 to 1976
