= Quiéreme siempre =

Mexican telenovela

- Genre: Telenovela
- Created by: Marissa Garrido
- Directed by: Alfredo Saldaña
- Starring: Jacqueline Andere; Victoria Ruffo; Juan Luis Gallardo; Gabriela Ruffo; Jorge Vargas; Nubia Martí; Úrsula Prats
- Opening theme: Quiéreme siempre by Fernando Riba
- Country of origin: Mexico
- Original language: Spanish

Production
- Executive producer: Ernesto Alonso
- Cinematography: Alfredo Saldaña
- Running time: 21–22 minutes

Original release
- Network: Canal de las Estrellas
- Release: 1981 – 1982

Related
- Al rojo vivo; El amor nunca muere

Quiéreme siempre (English title: Love Me Forever) is a Mexican telenovela produced by Ernesto Alonso for Televisa in 1981.

Jacqueline Andere and Juan Luis Gallardo starred as protagonists, while Úrsula Prats, Nubia Martí, Víctor Junco and Liza Willert starred as antagonists.

== Cast ==
- Jacqueline Andere as Ana Maria Ponce de Leon
- Victoria Ruffo as Julia
- Gabriela Ruffo as Evelina
- Juan Luis Gallardo as Alberto
- Jorge Vargas as Guillermo
- Nubia Martí as Isabel
- Úrsula Prats as Giuliana Murat
- Víctor Junco as Don Felipe
- Eduardo Yáñez as Carlos
- Liza Willert as Gudelia
- Enrique del Castillo as Lorenzo
- Rosita Bouchot as Juventina
- Carlos Riquelme as Ramon
- Nerina Ferrer as Emma
- Josefina Escobedo as Doña Luz
- Hector Gomez as Maestro Liberman
- Agustin Sauret as Chavez
- Servando Manzetti
- Antonio Medellín
- Martin Lasalle
- Fortino Salazar
