= Altaír Jarabo =

Mexican actress

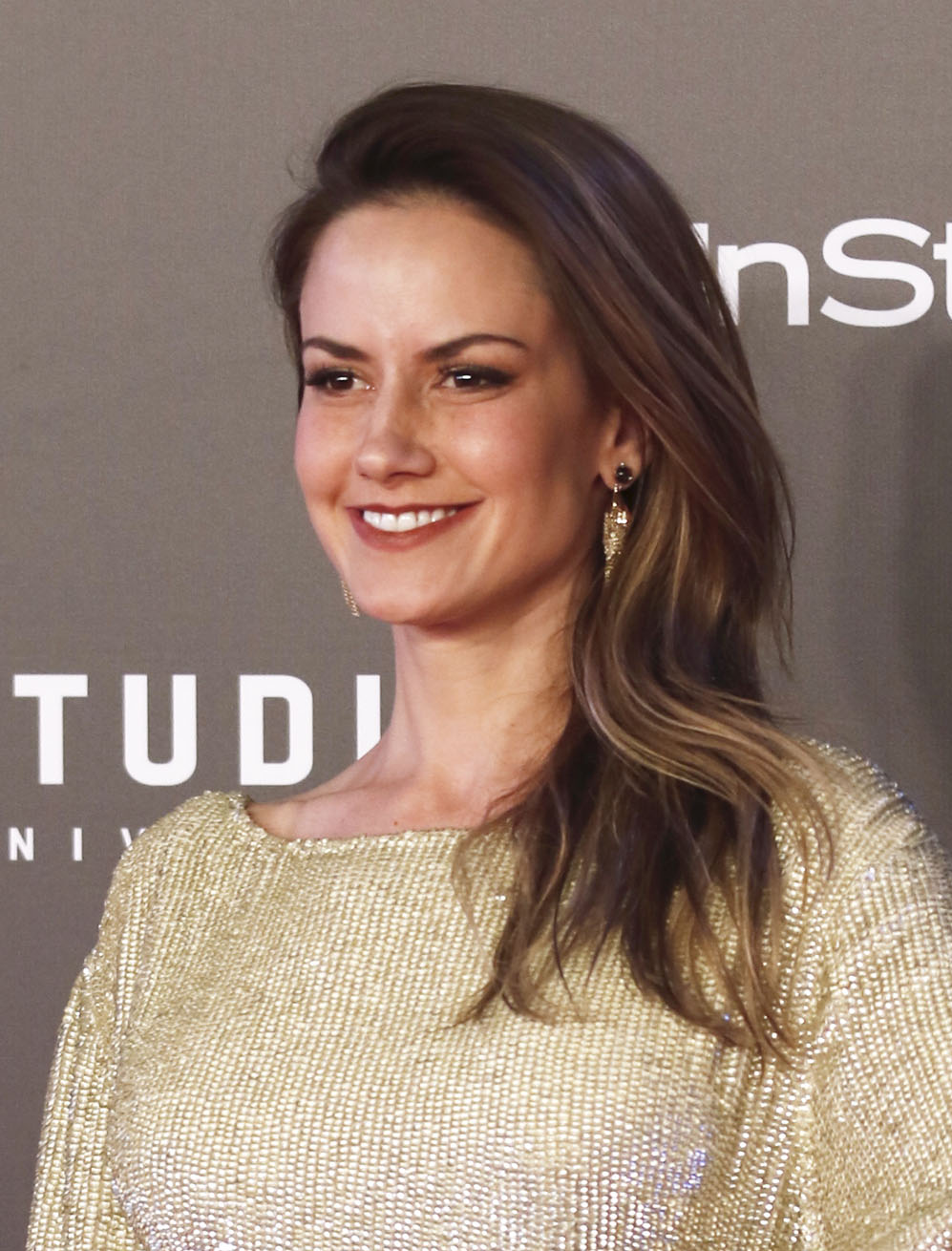
- Jarabo in 2017
- Born: Altaír Jarabo García; 7 August 1986 (age 40); Mexico City, Mexico
- Occupations: Actress; fashion model
- Years active: 2002-present
- Relatives: Jorge Jarabo Garcia (brother)

Altaír Jarabo García (born 7 August 1986) is a Mexican actress and fashion model. She is best known for her antagonistic roles in Mexican telenovelas including Inocente de ti, Al diablo con los guapos, En nombre del amor, Abismo de pasión, Mentir para vivir, Que te perdone Dios, Vencer el desamor and Corazón guerrero. She has a brother named Jorge Jarabo Garcia.

== Career ==
Born in Mexico city from a Mexican father and Venezuelan mother, She is well known as a fashion model in Mexico, Jarabo made her acting debut in 1993 in the telenovela El peñón del amaranto as Amaranta. In 2002, she appeared in Súbete a mi moto with Vanessa Acosta and Sandra Echeverría. She became popular worldwide by portraying Isela in the 2004 telenovela Inocente de ti, starring Camila Sodi and Valentino Lanús. In 2005, she appeared in El amor no tiene precio as Vanessa. In 2006, she portrayed as Afrodita Carvajal in the teenage telenovela Código Postal. In 2007, the audience saw her on Lola, érase una vez and Al diablo con los guapos. Born to an Israeli father and a Spanish mother, Altaír Jarabo became a popular actress and one of the most beautiful women in Mexico.

In 2008, Jarabo played a major role as Romina Mondragón En nombre del amor, opposite Allisson Lozz and Sebastián Zurita. She was later cast in Mi pecado in 2009 and Llena de amor in 2010. Two years later, she had another major role in the 2012 telenovela Abismo de pasion as Florencia Landucci, an Italian boarding-school student. In 2013, she starred as Raquel Ledesma in Mentir para vivir, produced by Rosy Ocampo. In 2015, she played the antagonist Diana Montero in Que te perdone Dios, produced by Angelli Nesma Medina.

Jarabo also co-starred in the telenovela Pasión y poder, produced by José Alberto Castro. In 2018, she joined the ensemble cast of legal drama Por amar sin ley in the role of Victoria Escalante, one of the key lawyers of the Vega y Asociados law firm.

== Filmography ==
Television performance
Year	Title	Roles	Notes
2002	Súbete a mi moto	Gaby	Special guest star
2003	Un nuevo amor	Ximena Itriago	
2004–2005	Inocente de ti	Isela González	Recurring role; 130 episodes
2005	El amor no tiene precio	Vanessa Monte y Valle	Recurring role; 280 episodes
2005–2006	Código postal	Afrodita Carvajal	Main role; 200 episodes
2007	Lola, érase una vez	Catherine	Special guest star
2007–2008	Al diablo con los guapos	Valeria Belmonte Arango	Recurring role; 175 episodes
2008–2009	Ugly Betty	Carmen	3 episodes
2008–2009	En nombre del amor	Romina Mondragón Rios	Main role; 169 episodes
2009	Mi pecado	Lorena Mendizábal	Recurring role; 100 episodes
2010–2011	Llena de amor	Ilitia Porta-López Rivero	Main role; 199 episodes
2012	Abismo de pasión	Florencia Landucci	Recurring role; 127 episodes
2013	Mentir para vivir	Raquel Ledesma	Main role; 91 episodes
2015	Que te perdone Dios	Diana Montero	Main role; 109 episodes
2015–2016	Pasión y poder	Consuelo Martínez de Montenegro	Main role; 130 episodes
2018–2019	Por amar sin ley	Victoria Escalante	Main role; 175 episodes
2019	Médicos	Victoria Escalante	Special guest star; 5 episodes
2020–2021	Vencer el desamor	Olga Collado	Main role; 74 episodes
2022	Corazón guerrero	Carlota Ruiz Montalvo Sandoval	Main role
2023	Juego de mentiras	Camila del Río	Lead role
2024	El amor no tiene receta	Ginebra Nicoliti	Main role

== Awards and nominations ==
=== Premios TVyNovelas ===
Year	Category	Telenovela	Result
2009	Best Female Revelation	Al diablo con los guapos	Nominated
2010	Best Female Antagonist	En nombre del amor	Nominated
2014	Best Female Antagonist	Mentir para vivir	Nominated

=== Premios Diosas de Plata ===
Year	Category	Film	Result
2010	Best Actress Revelation	Me importas tú y tú	Won

=== Premios People en Español ===
Year	Category	Telenovela	Result
2009	Best Villain	En nombre del amor	Nominated
2011	Best Supporting Actress	Llena de amor	Nominated
