= El precio de la fama =

Mexican telenovela

- Genre: Telenovela; Romance; Drama
- Created by: Carmen Daniels; Tere Medina
- Written by: Carmen Daniels
- Directed by: Sergio Jiménez
- Starring: Sonia Infante; Sergio Goyri; José Alonso; Susana Alexander; Eric del Castillo; Stephanie Salas
- Opening theme: Con tanto fuego by Juan Diego
- Country of origin: Mexico
- Original language: Spanish
- No. of episodes: 100

Production
- Executive producer: Ernesto Alonso
- Running time: 21-22 minutes (episodes 1-80); 41-44 minutes (episodes 81-100)
- Production company: Televisa

Original release
- Network: Canal de las Estrellas
- Release: February 16 – July 3, 1987

Related
- Cuna de lobos (21:00); El camino secreto (21:30); Victoria (21:00); Rosa Salvaje (21:30)

El precio de la fama (English title: The Price of Fame) is a Mexican telenovela produced by Ernesto Alonso for Televisa in 1987.

Sonia Infante and Sergio Goyri starred as protagonists, while José Alonso starred as main antagonist.

== Plot ==
Lucrecía is a famous and successful actress of telenovelas, but has reached the pinnacle of success using men. In her youth, the unmarried Lucrecia had a daughter. To avoid tarnishing her image with a scandal, she gave the child to her spinster sister Agnes to pass off as hers. After a long time, Lucrecia gets close to her "niece" Sonia, but the girl is only interested in what her relative can give her.

== Cast ==
- Sonia Infante as Lucrecia Aguilar Prado Castañeda
- Sergio Goyri as Jaime Garay
- José Alonso as Sergio Ferrer
- Susana Alexander as Inés
- Eric del Castillo as Alfonso Bernal
- Stephanie Salas as Sonia
- Andrea Ferrari as Manola
- Gabriela Goldsmith as Cecilia
- Felicia Mercado as Doris
- María Rivas as Mercedes
- Elsa Cárdenas as Eloísa de Bernal
- Eduardo Liñán as Eugenio Ferrer
- José Antonio Ferral as Bernardo
- Jerardo as Fernando Bernal
- Guillermo Aguilar as David
- Tony Bravo as Antonio
- Gilberto Román as Guillermo
- Paola Cano as Sonia (child)
- Juan Zaizar as Joel
- Juan Diego as Benito
- Melba Luna as Esther
- Rosa Salazar as Renata
- Mary Fernández as Rosa
- Miguel Ángel Negrete as Raúl
- Rocío Yaber as Secretary
- Roberto Vander
