= En nombre del amor =

Mexican telenovela

- Genre: Telenovela; Drama; Romance
- Created by: Martha Carrillo; Cristina García
- Written by: Denisse Pfeiffer
- Story by: María del Carmen Peña; Cuauhtémoc Blanco
- Directed by: Karina Duprez; Fernando Nesme
- Creative director: Israel Salazar
- Starring: Victoria Ruffo; Arturo Peniche; Leticia Calderón; Laura Flores
- Theme music composer: Laura Pausini; Agliardi; Paolo Carta
- Opening theme: "En cambio no" performed by Laura Pausini
- Country of origin: Mexico
- Original language: Spanish
- No. of episodes: 170

Production
- Executive producer: Carlos Moreno Laguillo
- Producer: Hilda Santaella Hernández
- Cinematography: Jesús Nájera; Juan Carlos Frutos
- Editors: Alfredo Sánchez; Jorge Silva
- Camera setup: Multi-camera

Original release
- Network: Canal de las Estrellas
- Release: October 13, 2008 – June 12, 2009

Related
- Cadenas de amargura (1991)

En nombre del amor (English: In the Name of Love) is a Mexican telenovela produced by Carlos Moreno Laguillo for Televisa.

It is the remake of Cadenas de amargura, written by María del Carmen Peña and Cuauhtémoc Blanco and produced in 1991.

Victoria Ruffo, Arturo Peniche, Leticia Calderón and Laura Flores star in this telenovela.

== Plot ==
The telenovela tells the story of two sisters, Macarena (Victoria Ruffo) and Carlota (Leticia Calderón), who paid with pain, loneliness and resentment for having fallen in love with the same man, as well as the consequences of that love on the mature stage of their lives; and, at the same time, it tells the story of two girls, Paloma (Allisson Lozz) and Romina (Altaír Jarabo), whose childhood was marked by solidarity and empathy, forging a friendship that over time will have to overcome the obstacles typical of youth when, with the arrival of first love, jealousy, envy and rivalry also arrive.

Paloma is a girl who, after the tragic death of her parents, is forced to live in the house of her two spinster aunts, Macarena and Carlota. Macarena is affectionate, supportive and establishes a close relationship with her niece, while Carlota is repressive, authoritarian and it seems that she enjoys making Paloma's life miserable. A family secret that is decisive in Paloma's life is jealously guarded by her aunts. When it is discovered, everything will change for her.

Paloma believes she has found true love with Iñaki (Luis Hacha), with whom she makes marriage plans, but her aunt, Carlota, takes it upon herself to separate her from this love forever. Paloma believes that she will never be able to find love again because it was not meant for her, but the presence of Emiliano (Sebastián Zurita) changes her life. The problem is that not only is he the boyfriend of Romina, her best friend, but he is also a man hated by her aunt, Carlota, which makes love between them impossible. However, Emiliano will fight to be by her side...

== Cast ==
=== Main ===
- Victoria Ruffo as Macarena Espinoza de los Monteros
- Arturo Peniche as Cristóbal Gamboa
- Leticia Calderón as Carlota Espinoza de los Monteros
- Laura Flores as Camila Ríos

=== Also main ===
- Allisson Lozz as Paloma Espinoza de los Monteros Díaz
  - Yanni as Child Paloma Espinoza de los Monteros Díaz
- Altaír Jarabo as Romina Mondragón Ríos
  - Georgina Domínguez as Child Romina Mondragón Ríos
- Sebastián Zurita as Emiliano Sáenz Noriega
  - Luciano Corigliano as Child Emiliano Sáenz Noriega
- Zoraida Gómez as Liliana Vega
- Alfredo Adame as Rafael Sáenz
- Víctor Cámara as Orlando Ferrer
- Magda Guzmán as Rufina "Rufi" Martínez
- Olivia Bucio as Diana Noriega de Sáenz
- Luis Hacha as Iñaki Iparraguirre
- Ferdinando Valencia as Germán Altamirano
- Pablo Magallanes as Aarón Cortázar
- Queta Lavat as Chief Nun
- Angelina Peláez as Arcadia Ortiz
- Lucero Lander as Inés Cortázar
- Eduardo Liñán as Father Benito Farías
- David Ostrosky as Dr. Rodolfo Bermúdez
- Yolanda Ventura as Angélica Ciénaga
- Paty Díaz as Natalia Ugarte
- Zoila Quiñónez as Doña Meche
- Ramón Abascal as Joel
- Jorge Alberto Bolaños as Samuel Mondragón
- Luis Couturier as Don Rodrigo Espinoza de los Monteros
- Lola Forner as Carmen de Iparraguirre
- Manuel Navarro as Alonso Iparraguirre
- Bibi Gaytán as Sagrario Díaz de Espinoza de los Monteros
- Eduardo Capetillo as Javier Espinoza de los Monteros

=== Recurring and guest stars ===
- Carlos Barragán as Evil man
- Patricia Calzada as Fina
- Manuel Capetillo Villaseñor as Edmundo
- Sergio Catalán as Darío Peñaloza
- Rubén Cerda as Judge
- Khristian Clausen as Vicky
- Ivette Cordovéz as Sofía
- Dobrina Cristeva as Elisa
- Iliana de la Garza as Felipa
- David del Real as Auxiliary bishop
- Hope Díaz as Receptionist
- Iliana Donatlán as Nurse
- Erick Elías as Gabriel Lizarde
- Said Ellas as Rubén
- Natalia Esperón as Luz Laguillo
- César Évora as Eugenio Lizarde
- Luis Gatica as Prosecutor Mariano Cordero
- Carlos Girón as Eric
- Claudia Godínez as Ana Mar
- Benjamín Islas as Lawyer Altamirano
- Alfonso Iturralde as Juancho
- Mago Kadima as Lawyer Rojas
- Hugo Macías Macotela as Father Mateo
- Gaby Mellado as Sandy
- Carmen Montejo as Madeleine Martelli
- Beatriz Moraya as Lorena Lozano
- Gerardo Murguía as Juan Carmona / Basilio Gaitán
- Haydeé Navarra as Miriam
- Cristina Obregón as Receptionist
- Abril Onyl as Juanita
- Conrado Osorio as Roberto Juárez
- Georgina Pedret as Clara
- Álex Perea as Alejandro
- Polly as Melanie
- Roxana Puente as Lourdes
- Fernanda Rohd as Arcadia's niece
- Mónika Rojas as Gloria
- Regina Rojas as Mónica
- Fernanda Ruizos as Valeria de la Parra
- Yozvan Santos as Prisoner
- Paulina Usigli as Secretary
- Rafael Valdés as Chava
- Rubén Zerecero as Memo
- Víctor Luis Zúñiga as Raúl

== Awards and nominations ==
Year	Award	Category	Nominee(s)	Result
2009	Micrófono de Oro	Outstanding Performance as a Female Lead	Leticia Calderón	Won
2009	Micrófono de Oro	Outstanding Performance as a Male Lead	Arturo Peniche	Won
2009	Bravo Awards	Best Male Revelation	Sebastián Zurita	Won
2009	People en Español Awards	Best Actress	Victoria Ruffo	Nominated
2009	People en Español Awards	Best Actor	Arturo Peniche	Nominated
2009	People en Español Awards	Best Villain	Altaír Jarabo	Nominated
2009	People en Español Awards	Best Villain	Leticia Calderón	Nominated
2009	People en Español Awards	Best Young Lead Actress or Actor	Allisson Lozz	Nominated
2009	People en Español Awards	Best Young Lead Actress or Actor	Sebastián Zurita	Nominated
2009	People en Español Awards	Best Couple	Allisson Lozz; Sebastián Zurita	Nominated
2009	People en Español Awards	Best Remake	En nombre del amor	Nominated
2010	TVyNovelas Awards	Best Actor	Arturo Peniche	Nominated
2010	TVyNovelas Awards	Best Antagonist Actress	Altaír Jarabo	Nominated
2010	TVyNovelas Awards	Best Antagonist Actress	Leticia Calderón	Won
2010	TVyNovelas Awards	Best Male Revelation	Sebastián Zurita	Won
2010	TVyNovelas Awards	Best Original Story or Adaptation	Martha Carrillo; Cristina García	Nominated
2010	Latin ACE Awards	Best Soap	En nombre del amor	Won
2010	Latin ACE Awards	Best Actress	Leticia Calderón	Won
2010	Latin ACE Awards	Best Supporting Actor	Arturo Peniche	Won
2010	Latin ACE Awards	Best Direction	Karina Duprez	Won
