= Quinceañera (TV series) =

Mexican telenovela

- 2013 poster
- Genre: Telenovela
- Created by: René Muñoz
- Written by: René Muñoz; Edmundo Báez; Marcia del Río
- Story by: Jorge Durán Chávez
- Directed by: Pedro Damián; Mónica Miguel
- Starring: Adela Noriega; Thalía; Blanca Sánchez; Jorge Lavat
- Opening theme: "Quinceañera" performed by Timbiriche
- Country of origin: Mexico
- Original language: Spanish
- No. of episodes: 103

Production
- Executive producer: Carla Estrada
- Production locations: Mexico City, Mexico
- Cinematography: Antonio Novaro
- Camera setup: Multi-camera

Original release
- Network: Canal de las Estrellas
- Release: October 5, 1987 – February 26, 1988

Related
- Senda de gloria; Amor en silencio

Quinceañera (English title: Sweet 15) is a Mexican teen telenovela created by René Muñoz and based on the 1960 Mexican film of the same name. Produced by Carla Estrada for Televisa, it aired on Canal de las Estrellas from 5 October 1987, to 26 February 1988. The series stars Adela Noriega, Thalía, Blanca Sánchez, and Jorge Lavat.

Its storyline addressed social issues rarely explored in Mexican telenovelas at the time, including substance abuse, rape, and gang violence. It is widely regarded as Mexico's first teen-oriented telenovela. The Associated Press (AP) included Quinceañera among the ten most influential telenovelas broadcast in Latin America, while People en Español and Terra have recognized it as one of the greatest telenovelas of all time.

== Plot ==
Maricruz (Adela Noriega) and Beatriz (Thalía) are classmates and best friends. Maricruz is from a working-class family, while Beatriz's is very wealthy. They are both 14 and excited about their quinceañera parties and becoming women.

Mechanic's apprentice Pancho (Ernesto Laguardia) and gang tough Memo (Sebastian Ligarde) are attracted to Maricruz. Maricruz is immediately disgusted by Memo and eventually accepts Pancho's love. Memo attacks Maricruz; she faints before he can rape her, but he lets her believe he did rape her. She feels violated, defiled, and unworthy of Pancho and believes he won't want her now.

At the same time, Maricruz's brother Gerardo (Rafael Rojas) starts dating Beatriz when their mother pressures her children to raise their social class. When Beatriz becomes pregnant, her family supports her after their initial horror. Both girls realize that the passage to womanhood was not what they expected.

== Cast ==
=== Main ===
- Adela Noriega as Maricruz Fernández Sarcoser
- Thalía as Beatriz Villanueva Contreras
- Blanca Sánchez as Ana María Contreras de Villanueva
- Jorge Lavat as Roberto Villanueva

=== Recurring ===
- Armando Araiza as "El Chato"
- Martha Aura as Gertrudis
- Luis Bayardo as Ramón Fernández
- Roberto Ballesteros as Antonio
- Julieta Bracho as Mrs. Palmira
- Silvia Caos as Consuelo
- Fernando Ciangherotti as Sergio Iturralde Contreras
- Julieta Egurrola as Carmen Sarcoser de Fernández
- Ana Bertha Espín as Estela
- Omar Fierro as Arturo
- Gabriel as "El Chamo"
- Enrique Gilabert as Mr. Villarreal
- Alejandra Gollas as Adriana Fernández Sarcoser
- Rosario Granados as Rosalía Viuda de Contreras
- Ernesto Laguardia as Pancho
- Sebastian Ligarde as Guillermo "Memo" López
- Ricardo D'Loera as Lawyer Espinoza
- Abraham Méndez as Ernesto
- Alicia Montoya as Licha
- Inés Morales as Elvira Contreras Viuda de Iturralde
- Lucha Moreno as Virginia Campos
- Pancho Muller as Andrés "Toluco" López
- René Muñoz as Timoteo "Timo"
- Nailea Norvind as Leonor Gutiérrez
- Rafael Rojas as Gerardo Fernández Sarcoser
- Margarita Sanz as Eduviges Sarcoser
- Maricarmen Vela as Enriqueta Solórzano
- Meche Barba as Lupe

== Soundtrack ==
=== Track listing ===
- Timbiriche – "Quinceañera (instrumental)"
- Pandora – "Ella se llenó de amor"
- Bryan Adams – "Native Son"
- Vangelis – "To the Unknown Man"
- Manuel Mijares – "El rey de la noche (instrumental)"
- Miguel Mateos – "Cuando seas grande"
- Michael Jackson – "Bad"
- Luis Miguel – "Cuando calienta el sol (instrumental)"
- Stevie Wonder – "I Just Called to Say I Love You (instrumental)"
- Pink Floyd – "Terminal Frost (instrumental)"
- Pandora – "Tu cariño"
- Miguel Mateos – "Cuando seas grande"
- W.A.S.P. - "Wild Child"

== Awards ==
| Year | Award | Category | Nominee | Result |
|---|---|---|---|---|
| 1988 | 6th TVyNovelas Awards | Best Telenovela | Carla Estrada | Won |
| 1988 | 6th TVyNovelas Awards | Best Antagonist Actor | Sebastián Ligarde | Won |
| 1988 | 6th TVyNovelas Awards | Best Young Lead Actress | Adela Noriega | Won |
| 1988 | 6th TVyNovelas Awards | Best Young Lead Actor | Ernesto Laguardia | Won |
| 1988 | 6th TVyNovelas Awards | Best Female Revelation | Thalía | Won |
| 1988 | 6th TVyNovelas Awards | Best Male Revelation | Armando Araiza | Won |
| 1988 | 6th TVyNovelas Awards | Best Debut Actress or Actor | Nailea Norvind | Won |
| 1988 | 6th TVyNovelas Awards | Best Original Story or Adaptation | René Muñoz | Won |
| 1988 | El Heraldo de México Awards | Best Telenovela | Carla Estrada | Won |
| 1988 | El Heraldo de México Awards | Best Revelation Actress | Adela Noriega | Won |

== Other versions ==
- Televisa made a remake of Quinceañera named Primer amor, a mil por hora in 2000, starring Kuno Becker, Anahí and Mauricio Islas, and a second remake, Miss XV, in 2012, starring Paulina Goto, Natasha Dupeyrón, Eleazar Gómez, Yago Muñoz, Jack Duarte and Macarena Achaga, both produced by Pedro Damián.
