= Emiliano Zurita =

Mexican actor

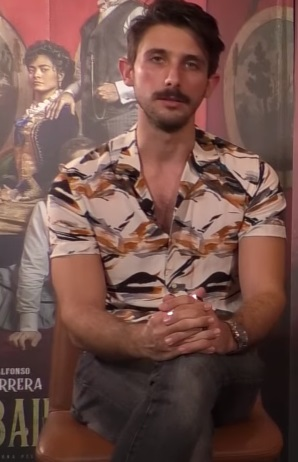
- Zurita in 2020
- Education: Pratt Institute
- Occupations: Actor, producer, writer
- Years active: 2010–present
- Parents: Humberto Zurita (father); Christian Bach (mother)
- Relatives: Sebastián Zurita (brother)

Emiliano Zurita is a Mexican actor, writer and producer, best known for his role as Felipe Quintanilla in the Telemundo' series Señora Acero (2018–2019). He is the son of actors Christian Bach and Humberto Zurita and younger brother of Sebastián Zurita. Zurita is a graduate of the Pratt Institute in New York as an architect. At the same time, he studied acting at Susan Batson Studios with James E. Lee and Susan Batson. He recently served as producer and writer of the Amazon Prime Video comedy series How to Survive Being Single with his brother, with whom he has a production company called Addiction House.

== Filmography ==
=== Film roles ===
Year	Title	Roles	Notes
2010	Ángel caído	Liut	
2018	El Muro	Pedro	Short film
2019	Guadalupe Reyes	Gabo	
2020	No, porque me enamoro	Gabo Gabeau	
2020	Dance of the 41	Evaristo Rivas	Nominated – Ariel Award for Best Supporting Actor
2020	El mesero	Pedro	

=== Television roles ===
Year	Title	Roles	Notes
2018–2019	Señora Acero	Felipe Quintanilla	Series regular (season 5); 65 episodes
2024	Zorro	Enrique Sánchez de Monasterio	Series Regular

=== Other works ===
Year	Title	Notes
2020	How to Survive Being Single	TV series; as producer and writer
