= How to Survive Being Single =

Mexican comedy web television series

- Genre: Comedy
- Created by: Marcos Bucay; Sebastián and Emiliano Zurita
- Starring: Sebastián Zurita
- Country of origin: Mexico
- Original language: Spanish
- No. of seasons: 3
- No. of episodes: 26

Production
- Production companies: Campanario Entertainment; Addiction House

Original release
- Network: Amazon Prime Video
- Release: 26 June 2020 – 22 March 2023

How to Survive Being Single (Spanish: Cómo sobrevivir soltero), is a Mexican comedy television series created by Sebastián and Emiliano Zurita that premiered on Amazon Prime Video on 26 June 2020. The series is produced by Campanario Entertainment, and Addiction House. The show revolves around Sebastián (Sebastián Zurita), an actor who has been stuck in a famous character that he hasn't been able to part with, and as a result, he loses his 10-year relationship with Lucía and has to adjust to life as a single man. On 30 March 2021, the series was renewed for a second and third season The third season premiered on 22 March 2023.

== Plot ==
Sebastián, a Mexican actor, has a seemingly perfect life that is twisted when his girlfriend of more than a decade deceives him. His compass is broken and it seems that his life reaches a point of no return, sinking rapidly. Sebastián returns to the world of dating newly single and discovers that his flirting abilities are not the best. The rest of his single friends help him discover that there are other single people who find it hard to find love. This Mexican TV series explores the advantages and disadvantages of being single in a culture in which man prevails.

== Cast ==
- Sebastián Zurita as Sebastián
- Roberto Flores as Daniel
- Pamela Almanza as Lucía
- Lucía Gómez-Robledo as Mafer
- Fabrizio Santini as Fish
- Octavio Hinojosa as Gonzalo
- Tato Alexander as Fabiana
- Memo Villegas as Adán Farré
- Justina Bustos as Natalia
- Juana Arias as Julieta
- Alfonso Herrera as himself (cameo)
- Christian Chávez as himself (cameo)
- Maite Perroni as herself (cameo)

== Episodes ==
Series	Episodes	Originally released
1	10	26 June 2020
2	8	15 April 2022
3	8	22 March 2023

=== Season 1 (2020) ===
No. overall	No. in season	Title	Directed by	Written by	Original release date
1	1	"Dumped2"	Ariel Winograd	Marcos Bucay	26 June 2020
2	2	"The Temple of Smiles"	Salvador Espinosa	Jaime Muñoz de Baena	26 June 2020
3	3	"Melodi"	Ariel Winograd	Roberto Flores	26 June 2020
4	4	"Love Ride"	Marcos Bucay	Andreina Borges	26 June 2020
5	5	"Friends For What?"	Salvador Espinosa	Roberto Flores & Rosa Clemente	26 June 2020
6	6	"HIV"	Salvador Espinosa	Cynthia Fernandez Trejo	26 June 2020
7	7	"Romcom"	Salvador Espinosa	Rosa Clemente Garcia	26 June 2020
8	8	"F*ck Me More"	Salvador Espinosa	Marcos Bucay	26 June 2020
9	9	"Wrap It Up"	Emiliano Zurita & Sebastian Zurita	Andreina Borges & Cynthia Fernandez	26 June 2020
10	10	"We Were a Short Story"	Marcos Bucay	Marcos Bucay & Jaime Muñoz de Baena	26 June 2020

=== Season 2 (2022) ===
No. overall	No. in season	Title	Directed by	Written by	Original release date
11	1	"The Fifth Date"	Unknown	Unknown	15 April 2022
12	2	"All The World is a Stage"	Unknown	Unknown	15 April 2022
13	3	"The Pox Party"	Unknown	Unknown	15 April 2022
14	4	"Orgy-athon"	Unknown	Unknown	15 April 2022
15	5	"Missed Connection"	Unknown	Unknown	15 April 2022
16	6	"Guys vs Girls"	Unknown	Unknown	15 April 2022
17	7	"Mexican Psycho"	Unknown	Unknown	15 April 2022
18	8	"The Last Show"	Unknown	Unknown	15 April 2022

=== Season 3 (2023) ===
No. overall	No. in season	Title	Directed by	Written by	Original release date
19	1	"Misery"	Unknown	Unknown	22 March 2023
20	2	"How to End a Toxic Relationship?"	Unknown	Unknown	22 March 2023
21	3	"The Lies We Believe"	Unknown	Unknown	22 March 2023
22	4	"Everyone Moves on But Me"	Unknown	Unknown	22 March 2023
23	5	"Three Birds with One Stone"	Unknown	Unknown	22 March 2023
24	6	"Party Time"	Unknown	Unknown	22 March 2023
25	7	"The Great Escape"	Unknown	Unknown	22 March 2023
26	8	"A Daring Journey"	Unknown	Unknown	22 March 2023

== Release ==
How to Survive Being Single premiered on Amazon Prime Video on 26 June 2020. The second season premiered on 15 April 2022. The third season premiered on 22 March 2023.
