= El juego de las llaves =

- Genre: Comedy
- Created by: Marisa Quiroga
- Developed by: Patrick McGinley; Verónica Bellver; Sandro Halphen; Jessica Silvetti
- Starring: Maite Perroni; Sebastián Zurita; Marimar Vega; Humberto Busto; Horacio Pancheri; Hugo Catalán; Ela Velden; Fabiola Campomanes; Cristián de la Fuente; Alejandra Guzmán; Laura León
- Country of origin: Mexico
- Original language: Spanish
- No. of seasons: 3
- No. of episodes: 24

Production
- Executive producers: Eckehardt von Damm; Sandro Halphen; Roberto Fiesco; Fernando Lebrija; Javier Colinas
- Editors: Roque Azcuaga; Max Blásquez; Claudia Aimée Flores; Joaquim Martí Márqués; Emiliano Arenales Osorio; Sebastián Del Valle

Original release
- Network: Amazon Prime Video
- Release: 16 August 2019 – present

El juego de las llaves is a Mexican comedy television series created by Marisa Quiroga. It premiered on 16 August 2019 on Amazon Prime Video. The series features an ensemble cast including Maite Perroni, Humberto Busto, Marimar Vega, Sebastián Zurita, Horacio Pancheri, Fabiola Campomanes, Hugo Catalán, and Ela Velden.

In January 2020, the series was renewed for a second and third season. The second season premiered on 16 September 2021. The third season premiered on 14 February 2024. In August 2026, it was announced the series was renewed for a fourth season

== Premise ==
The series follows the lives of a group of friends who decide to be swingers among themselves, while also addressing issues such as monogamy in long relationships, self-realization and desire.

== Cast ==
=== Main ===
- Maite Perroni as Adriana "Adri" Romero (seasons 1–2)
- Sebastián Zurita as Sergio Morales (season 1)
- Marimar Vega as Gabriela "Gaby" Albarrán (seasons 1–2)
- Humberto Busto as Óscar Romero
- Horacio Pancheri as Valentín Lombardo
- Hugo Catalán as Leonardo "Leo" Cuevas
- Ela Velden as Siena (seasons 1–2)
- Fabiola Campomanes as Bárbara Cuevas
- Cristián de la Fuente as Guillermo (season 2)
- Alejandra Guzmán as Astrid (season 2)
- Laura León as Gloria (season 2)
- Gaby Espino as Olivia (season 3)
- Alejandro de la Madrid as Samuel (season 3)
- Antonio Fortier as Rubén (season 3; recurring season 2)
- Luis Vegas as Gerónimo (season 3)
- Helena Haro as Carmen (season 3; recurring seasons 1–2)
- Cassandra Sánchez Navarro as Daniela (season 3)
- Mauricio Garza as Rodrigo (season 3)

=== Recurring and guest stars ===
- Abril Michel as Mica Romero
- Luca Valentini as Fidel
- Sergio Perezcuadra as Emiliano
- Christian Ramos as Pedro
- Gustavo Egelhaaf as Juan Alejandro
- Alejandra Toussaint as Aurelia
- Anahí Allué as Amelia
- Joss Jagar as Flavio
- Stefy García as Lina
- Helena Haro as Carmen
- Manuel Vega as Daniel
- Anahí Allué as Amelia
- Mariel Molino as Gala
- Mauro González as Officer Pérez
- Agustín Arana
- Manu Nna
- Diana Lein
- Javier Oliván
- Javier Gómez

== Episodes ==
=== Series overview ===
Series	Episodes	Originally released	
Series	Episodes	First released	Last released
1	10	16 August 2019	30 August 2019
2	8	16 September 2021	30 September 2021
3	6	14 February 2024	

=== Season 1 (2019) ===
No. overall	No. in season	Title	Directed by	Written by	Original release date
1	1	"Never Have I Ever" (Yo nunca nunca)	Fernando Lebrija	Patrick McGinley	16 August 2019
2	2	"Vanilla Isn't the Only Flavor" (Vainilla no es el único sabor)	Fernando Lebrija	Verónica Bellver	16 August 2019
3	3	""Rayan Gosling"'s Double" (El doble de "Brayan Goslin")	Javier Colinas	Natalia Mejía	16 August 2019
4	4	"An Oral "Pleasance"" (Una "placencia" oral)	Kenya Márquez	Patrick McGinley	16 August 2019
5	5	"There Will Be Consequences" (Habrá consecuencias)	Javier Colinas	Verónica Bellver	16 August 2019
6	6	"Little Oscar... Big Oscar!!!" (Oscarín... ¡Oscarón!)	Kenya Márquez	Natalia Mejía	23 August 2019
7	7	"Make Me Crazy... Yay Yay Yay" (Enloquéceme yei yei yei)	Javier Colinas	Patrick McGinley	23 August 2019
8	8	"The Kids Need Discipline" (Los niños necesitan disciplina)	Kenya Márquez	Verónica Bellver	30 August 2019
9	9	"Stop Saying Condom!" (¡Deja de decir condón!)	Fernando Lebrija	Natalia Mejía	30 August 2019
10	10	"I Declare the "Game of Keys" Inaugurated" (Declaro inaugurado "El juego de las llaves")	Kenya Márquez	Patrick McGinley	30 August 2019

=== Season 2 (2021) ===
No. overall	No. in season	Title	Directed by	Written by	Original release date
11	1	"I Hate the Game of Keys" (Odio el juego de las llaves)	Javier Colinas & Kenya Márquez	Verónica Bellver	16 September 2021
12	2	"Introducing... Astrid & Gloria" (Con ustedes... ¡Astrid y Gloria!)	Javier Colinas & Kenya Márquez	Jessica Silvetti	16 September 2021
13	3	"Takes a New Game to Forget an Old Game" (Un juego saca otro juego)	Javier Colinas & Kenya Márquez	Verónica Bellver	16 September 2021
14	4	"Back to the Game" (Regreso al juego)	Javier Colinas & Kenya Márquez	Jessica Silvetti	16 September 2021
15	5	"Amazons, Pregnant Women and Aztec Warriors" (Amazonas, guerreras, embarazadas y caballeros águila)	Javier Colinas & Kenya Márquez	Verónica Bellver	23 September 2021
16	6	"Gender Reveal" (Revelación de género)	Javier Colinas & Kenya Márquez	Jessica Silvetti	23 September 2021
17	7	"The First of Many Jerks" (El primero de muchos patanes)	Javier Colinas & Kenya Márquez	Jessica Silvetti	30 September 2021
18	8	"Here We Come, Beach!" (¡Vamos a la playa!)	Javier Colinas & Kenya Márquez	Verónica Bellver	30 September 2021

=== Season 3 (2024) ===
No. overall	No. in season	Title	Directed by	Written by	Original release date
19	1	"We Need to Talk" (Tenemos que hablar)	Javier Colinas	Jessica Silvetti & Gustavo Hérnandez de Anda	14 February 2024
20	2	"Rip It Like the Bandaids, Without Thinking About It" (Como las curitas, de chingadazo)	Javier Colinas	Jessica Silvetti & Gustavo Hérnandez de Anda	14 February 2024
21	3	"You Get the Game by Playing It" (Solo jugando se entiende el juego)	Emiliano Arenales Osorio	Jessica Silvetti & Gustavo Hérnandez de Anda	14 February 2024
22	4	"El Edén" (El Edén)	Emiliano Arenales Osorio	Jessica Silvetti & Gustavo Hérnandez de Anda	14 February 2024
23	5	"Fix Your Own Mess" (Arregla tu desmadrito)	Emiliano Arenales Osorio	Jessica Silvetti & Gustavo Hérnandez de Anda	14 February 2024
24	6	"I Pronounce You Ex Husband and Ex Wife!" (¡Los declaro ex marido y ex mujer!)	Javier Colinas	Jessica Silvetti & Gustavo Hérnandez de Anda	14 February 2024

== Production ==
El juego de las llaves is co-produced by Amazon Prime Video, Pantaya and Corazón Films. On 29 January 2020, the series was renewed for a second and third season. Filming of the second season began in November 2020.

== Release ==
The series premiered on Amazon Prime Video on 16 August 2019. In the United States, the first two seasons streamed on Pantaya, while the third season moved to Vix, following TelevisaUnivision's acquisition of Pantaya. The second season premiered on 16 September 2021. The third season premiered on 14 February 2024.

== Awards and nominations ==
Year	Award	Category	Nominated	Result	Ref.
2019	GQ México	Best Series of the Year	El juego de las llaves	Won	
2020	GLAAD Media Award	Outstanding Spanish-Language Scripted Television Series	El juego de las llaves	Nominated	

== International versions ==
Two adaptations of the series have been made so far in Spain and Germany.

Country	Local title	Network	Original release
Spain	El juego de las llaves "The Key Game"	Prime Video	April 13, 2022
Germany	Friends Sex And Games	Prime Video	October 16, 2026
