= Por tu amor =

Television series

- Genre: Telenovela; Romance; Drama
- Created by: Caridad Bravo Adams
- Written by: Gabriela Ortigoza; Ricardo Fiallega; Juan Carlos Tejeda; Carmen Sepúlveda; Begoña Fernández
- Directed by: Luis Eduardo Reyes; Alfredo Gurrola; Lily Garza; Benjamín Pineda
- Starring: Gabriela Spanic; Saúl Lisazo; Katie Barberi; Gerardo Murguía; Roberto Vander
- Opening theme: Por tu amor by Charlie Zaa
- Country of origin: Mexico
- Original language: Spanish (1999)
- No. of episodes: 90

Production
- Executive producer: Angelli Nesma Medina
- Producer: María de Jesús Arellano
- Production locations: Filming; Televisa San Ángel; Mexico City, Mexico; Locations; San Carlos, Mexico; Mexico City, Mexico; Chicago, United States
- Cinematography: Gilberto Macín; Roberto Zamora Soldevilla
- Camera setup: Multi-camera
- Running time: 41-44 minutes
- Production company: Televisa

Original release
- Network: Canal de las Estrellas
- Release: May 31 – October 1, 1999

Related
- El Otro (1960)

Por tu amor (English: For your love) is a Mexican telenovela produced by Angelli Nesma Medina for Televisa in 1999. It aired on Canal de las Estrellas from May 31 to October 1, 1999. In the United States, it aired on Univision from May 8 to September 15, 2000.

Gabriela Spanic and Saúl Lisazo starred as protagonists, while Katie Barberi, Mauricio Aspe, Claudio Báez and Gerardo Albarrán starred as antagonists. Gerardo Murguía, Roberto Vander and Margarita Magaña co-starred.

== Plot ==
The residences of little coast town San Carlos are living peacefully, until the arrival of the rich, mysterious man Marco Duran (Saul Lizaso).

Maria del Cielo (Gabriela Spanic) is a pretty girl that easily captured Marco's interest. He sees in her the girl he had always dreamed about.

On the other hand, Maria del Cielo sees him as nothing but an intruder.

Cielo lives with her father, Nicolas, her grandmother, Paz and her sister Brisa (Margarita Mangana). She stepped into the role of a mother figure for her sister Brisa since they lost their mom when they were little girls.

Cielo is engaged to a town doctor, Sergio Zambrano (Gerardo Murguia).

During the wedding preparations, she learned that Sergio has fallen under the influence of her sister Brisa and that he spent a wild passionate night on a beach with her.

To keep the good family name, Cielo sacrificed her love. She broke up her engagement to Sergio and forced him to marry her sister Brisa instead.

Towards Marco, Cielo shows nothing but despise and contempt, she is not aware that slowly, she started to fall in love with him.

Marco doesn't know his biological roots; he grew up as an orphan and that left big trails in his life. But, in spite of that, with his persistence, he made big fortune. In front of Cielo, he acts like a bastard, without any manners and education. Even when he is in love with Cielo; he has his long time mistress, Miranda (Katie Barberi).

Miranda is a young adventuress, who is capable of doing everything to have Marco marry her. The big part in San Carlos belongs to Raquel and a secret she thought was buried deep in the past. Meanwhile, Sergio is unhappy with his own marriage, he comes to bother Cielo all the time. To counter, Cielo accepted Marco's marriage proposal. Miranda takes vengeance on Ciela and Marco.

== Cast ==
- Gabriela Spanic as María del Cielo "Cielo" Montalvo Arizmendi de Durán/Aurora Arizmendi de Montalvo
- Saúl Lisazo as Marco Durán
- Katie Barberi as Miranda Narváez de Durán
- Gerardo Murguía as Dr. Sergio Zambrano
- Roberto Vander as Nicolás Montalvo Gallardo
- Irán Eory as Paz "Mamá Paz" Gallardo Vda. de Montalvo
- Margarita Magaña as Brisa Montalvo Arizmendi de Zambrano
- Joaquín Cordero as Lázaro Robledo
- Lourdes Munguía as Alma Ledesma de Higueras/Mayra Rivas
- Alfonso Iturralde as Rafael Luévano
- Norma Lazareno as Adelaida Vda. de Zambrano
- Mauricio Aspe as René Higueras Ledesma
- Aitor Iturrioz as Agustín Higueras Ledesma
- Adriana Nieto as Abigaíl Parra/Abigaíl Durán Parra
- Claudio Báez as Luciano Higueras
- Jorge Poza as David Parra
- Yadira Santana as Raquel Parra
- Roberto Ballesteros as Sandro Valle
- Isaura Espinoza as Alejandra Avellán de Robledo
- Gabriela Goldsmith as Sonia Narváez
- Lourdes Reyes as María Fernanda "Marifé" Cifuentes Álvarez
- Guillermo Aguilar as Father Ponciano
- Gerardo Albarrán as Julián Leyva
- Sergio Sánchez as Don Eliseo Cifuentes
- Maleni Morales as Carlota Álvarez de Cifuentes
- Carlos Monden as Arquitecto Leoncio Ariza
- Graciela Estrada as Petra
- Daniel Gauvry as Mauricio Torres
- Rosita Bouchot as Azucena
- Melba Luna as Hilaria
- Vicky Rodel as Olga
- Pilar Escalante as Hilda
- Ramiro Torres as Jesús Cifuentes Álvarez
- Irma Torres as Bruja
- Liza Willert as Roxana
- Marlene Favela as Mónica
- Gustavo Negrete as Arquitecto Monroy
- José Antonio Estrada as Fausto
- Javier Ortiz as Pablo
- Claudia Palacios as Rosalba
- Carlos Bracho as Luévano
- Fátima Torre as Flor
- Polly as Pilar
- Patricia Martínez as Josefina
- Raquel Pankowsky as Dra. Obregón
- Rodolfo Lago as Juez Pereyra
- Eduardo Liñán as Lic. Medina
- Servando Manzetti as Álvaro
- Justo Martínez as Guillén
- Pedro Romo as Rubalcaba
- Alejandro Rábago as Lic. Alcalá
- Raúl Valerio as Don Rigoberto
- Rocío Yaber as Ximena Salazar
- Ingrid Martz as Paz Gallardo (young)
- Mario Garballido as Arquitecto Leoncio Ariza (young)
- Grettel Valdez as Alejandra Avellán (young)
- Javier Herranz as Lazaro Robledo (young)
- Ricardo Chávez as Theater actor
- Roger Cudney as Doctor
- Omar Ayala as Sailor
- José Luis Montemayor as Pablo's friend
