= Roberto Vander =

Dutch-Chilean actor and singer (born 1950)

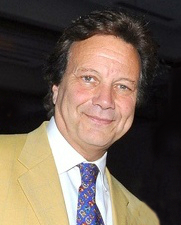
- Vander in 2010
- Born: Frans Robert Jan van der Hoek; September 20, 1950 (age 74); Laren, North Holland, Netherlands
- Occupation(s): Actor, singer
- Years active: 1980–present

Roberto Vander (born Frans Robert Jan van der Hoek; September 20, 1950) is a Dutch-Chilean actor and singer.

== Biography ==
After living in different Latin American countries such as Chile, Uruguay, Argentina, and Brazil, he settled in Mexico in 1980 after being a guest in the popular musical show Siempre en Domingo with Raúl Velasco where he presented his second album.

He toured for three years and was offered a role in the telenovela Cuna de lobos a soap opera that would become one of the greatest successes of its network Televisa. He later acted in Victoria and El precio de la fama. In the telenovela Senda de gloria ("Glorious path") he took the role of a Dutch-English villain and the opportunity to speak Dutch and English.

The success of Senda de gloria allowed him to obtain a role in Chilean telenovela Semidios produced by Universidad Católica de Chile's Canal 13 where he also sang the title song. For the same channel he made Bravo and returned to Mexico a year later to participate in a new version of Simplemente María and in La pícara soñadora, both soaps became hits in Latin America, Europe, Turkey and Russia. In 1992, Van Der returned to Chile to participate in two telenovelas and back to Mexico in 1994 he made Caminos cruzados. In 1995 he returned to Chile to make two telenovelas and started his own company Roberto Vander Prod to facilitate the access of Chilean media to actresses like Alicia Machado and other artists. In 1997 he participated in a telenovela with Televisa and next year he made Enséñame a querer with Venevisión, the most important television network in Venezuela.

He was interviewed by Dutch network NCRV in February 1999 in a 25-minute presentation from his home in Chile. This interview was broadcast on May 11 of the same year through the network Nederland 1. The same year he made Por tu amor in Mexico and in 2000 he made Milagros in Peru. In 2002 and 2003 he made two telenovelas for Televisa and was awarded the Azteca de Oro ("Golden Aztec") as Best Actor for his role in Salomé by the Asociación de Periodistas Mexicanos de Radio y Televisión ("Mexican association of radio and television journalists"). He made the new version of Rubí in 2004, this telenovela was considered as the best of the year and he was awarded El Sol de Oro ("Golden Sun") for his career and his role in this production and was nominated for the TVyNovelas award as "Best Supporting Actor".

== Discography ==
- 1980 – En la esquina del café
- 1988 – Roberto Vander
- 1990 – María Sola

== Filmography ==
=== Films ===
Year	Title	Role	Notes
1986	Club Med		Television film
1986	Mauro el mojado	Jeff	
2004	Rubí, la descarada	Arturo de la Fuente	Television film

=== Television ===
Year	Title	Role	Notes
1986	Cuna de lobos	Julio Cifuentes	
1987	Victoria	Ray	
1987	Senda de gloria	James Van Hallen	
1987	El precio de la fama	Himself	
1988	Semidiós	Hugo	
1989	Simplemente María	Rafael Hidalgo	
1989	Bravo	Juan Pablo	
1990	En carne propia		
1991	La pícara soñadora	Gregorio Rochild	
1992	Fácil de amar	Mario	
1993	Doble juego	Patricio Corral	
1994	Caminos Cruzados	Ambrosio Jimenés y Cisneros	
1995	Amor a domicilio	Guillermo Stone	
1996	Adrenalina	Gerardo Ahumada	
1997	Sin ti	Guillermo Ysaguirre	Lead antagonist
1998	Enséñame a querer	Rafael	
1999	Por tu amor	Don Nicolás Montalvo-Ariza Gallardo	
2000	Milagros	Benjamin Muñoz	
2001	Salomé	Mauricio Valdivia	Antagonist
2003	Amores urbanos		
2003	Velo de novia	Don Germán del Alamo	
2004	Mariana de la noche	Engineer Ángel Villaverde	
2004	Rubí	Don Arturo De La Fuente	
2005	El Amor No Tiene Precio	Don Germán Garcés	
2007	Destilando amor	Don Ricardo Duarte	
2007–2008	Al diablo con los guapos	Don Néstor Miranda	
2008	Fuego en la sangre	Dr. Gilberto Castañeda	
2009–2010	Teatro en CHV	Marcelo / Rogelio	"Todo por un caño" (season 7, episode 5) "Peor que pulga en la oreja" (season 8, episode 19)
2010	Salvador de mujeres	Julio César	
2010	Pecadora	Don Cayetano	
2011	Los herederos del Monte	Don Emilio del Monte / Pablo González	
2011	Infiltradas	Octavio Gangas	7 episodes
2012	El Talismán	Don Esteban Nájera	
2012–2013	La Sexóloga	Don Axel Cooper	
2013	Pasión prohibida	Don Ariel Piamonte	
2014–2015	Hasta el fin del mundo	Don Gerónimo Peralta De la Riva	Overarching antagonist
