= A World Not to Come =

2013 history book

- Author: Raúl Coronado
- Subject: Hispanic American literary criticism, Mexican history, Hispanic American Studies, 19th century American history
- Published: June 2013 (Harvard University Press)
- Pages: 574
- ISBN: 978-0-674-07261-9

A World Not to Come: A History of Latino Writing and Print Culture is a 2013 history book by Raúl Coronado about the development of Latino identity through the use of writing and print culture in the 19th century.

== Reception ==
The book received seven book awards and two honorable mentions. It received awards from the Texas Institute of Letters, the National Association for Chicana and Chicano Studies, the Texas A&M University Melbern G. Glasscock Center for Humanities Research, the Modern Language Association, the Philosophical Society of Texas, the American Studies Association, and the Texas State Historical Association. It received honorable mentions from the Society for U.S. Intellectual History and the Western Literature Association. Beginning on May 15, 2015, the Society for U.S. Intellectual History held an online forum whereby three scholars reviewed the book followed by a response by the author.

Year	Institution	Award	Result	Ref.
2013	Western Literature Association	Thomas J. Lyon Book Award in Western American Literary and Cultural Studies	Honorable mention	
2013	Texas State Historical Association	Kate Broocks Bates Award for Historical Research	Won	
2013	Modern Language Association	Prize for a First Book	Won	
2014	Society for U.S. Intellectual History	Book Award	Honorable mention	
2014	Texas Institute of Letters	Renato Ramírez Scholarly Book Award	Won	
2014	Philosophical Society of Texas	Award of Merit	Won	
2014	Melbern G. Glasscock Center for Humanities Research at Texas A&M University	Susanne M. Glasscock Humanities Book Prize	Won	
2014	American Studies Association	John Hope Franklin Publication Prize	Won	
2015	National Association for Chicana and Chicano Studies	Book Award	Won	
