= Victoria (Mexican TV series) =

- Genre: Telenovela
- Created by: Luis Reyes de la Maza
- Written by: Tere Medina
- Directed by: Alfredo Gurrola
- Starring: Victoria Ruffo; Juan Ferrara
- Opening theme: "Tarde" by Victoria Ruffo
- Country of origin: Mexico
- Original language: Spanish
- No. of episodes: 160

Production
- Executive producer: Ernesto Alonso
- Cinematography: Ariel Blanco
- Production company: Televisa

Original release
- Network: Canal de las Estrellas
- Release: July 6, 1987 – February 12, 1988

Victoria is a Mexican telenovela produced by Ernesto Alonso for Televisa in 1987. Its original story of Luis Reyes de la Maza, was adapted by Tere Medina and directed by Alfredo Gurrola.

Victoria Ruffo and Juan Ferrara starred as protagonists.

== Plot ==
This telenovela tells the adventures of Victoria a foreign girl who comes to Mexico with the aim of finding a husband, clearly these situations are rare with a dose of melodrama and comedy that gave freshness to the story, despite not being a success equaled the success of the original, this according to critics of the lack of independence between one and the other because they were exactly alike.

== Cast ==
- Victoria Ruffo as Victoria Martínez Medina
- Juan Ferrara as Juan Alfonso de los Santos
- Isabela Corona as Montserrat Williams de de los Santos
- Roberto Vander as Reinaldo "Ray"
- Gina Romand as Anabel de Santana
- Gabriela Ruffo as Carmenza Martínez
- Guillermo Murray as Leonel de los Santos
- Rosario Gálvez as Sara Williams y Montero
- Marco Muñoz as Guillermo
- Raymundo Capetillo as Joaquín de los Santos
- Rebeca Silva as Carmina Rodríguez
- Emilia Carranza as Amelia Espinosa de los Reyes
- Miguel Manzano as Jeremías
- Xavier Marc as Gerardo de los Santos
- Miguel Macía as Teodoro Jerez
- Oscar Servin as Pascual
- Flor Trujillo as Lucía de los Santos
- Aurora Alonso as Bertha
- Yolanda Ciani as Verónica Moguel Oliva
- Raquel Pankowsky as Hortensia
- Cecilia Gabriela as Eloisa
- Alicia Montoya as Esperanza
- Luis Aguilar as Gregorio Estrada
- Luis Xavier as Mario Moguel Oliva
- Roberto D'Amico as Miguel Santana
- Toño Infante as Aurelio
- Martha Resnikoff as Soledad
- Sergio Suani as Felipe
- Consuelo Frank as Doña Gabriela Oliva
- Lucy Cantú as Minerva
- Guillermo Aguilar as Rodolfo
- Irma Infante as Virginia
- Romina Castro as Cristina de la Peña

== Awards ==
Year	Award	Category	Nominee	Result
1988	6th TVyNovelas Awards	Best Telenovela	Ernesto Alonso	Nominated
1988	6th TVyNovelas Awards	Best Actress	Victoria Ruffo	Nominated
1988	6th TVyNovelas Awards	Best Actor	Juan Ferrara	Nominated
1988	6th TVyNovelas Awards	Best Antagonist Actress	Isabela Corona	Nominated
1988	6th TVyNovelas Awards	Best Experienced Actress	Rosario Gálvez	Won
1988	6th TVyNovelas Awards	Best Experienced Actor	Miguel Manzano	Nominated
1988	6th TVyNovelas Awards	Best Young Lead Actress	Gabriela Ruffo	Nominated
1988	6th TVyNovelas Awards	Best Young Lead Actor	Luis Xavier	Nominated
1988	6th TVyNovelas Awards	Best Female Revelation	Flor Trujillo	Nominated
1988	6th TVyNovelas Awards	Best Male Revelation	Roberto Vander	Nominated
