= Rosa salvaje =

Mexican telenovela

- Genre: Telenovela
- Created by: Carlos Romero; Gabriela Ortigoza
- Written by: Dolores Ortega; Vivian Pestalozzi
- Story by: Inés Rodena; Abel Santacruz
- Directed by: Beatriz Sheridan
- Starring: Verónica Castro; Guillermo Capetillo
- Theme music composer: José "Potro" Farías
- Opening theme: "Rosa salvaje" performed by Verónica Castro
- Country of origin: Mexico
- Original language: Spanish
- No. of episodes: 199

Production
- Executive producer: Valentín Pimstein
- Producer: Angelli Nesma Medina
- Production locations: Mexico City, Mexico
- Cinematography: Ernesto Arreola
- Editor: Adrián Frutos
- Camera setup: Multi-camera
- Production company: Televisa

Original release
- Network: Canal de las Estrellas
- Release: July 6, 1987 – April 8, 1988

Related
- El precio de la fama; El extraño retorno de Diana Salazar; Abrázame muy fuerte (2000); Gata salvaje (2002); La gata (2014); Que te perdone Dios (2015)

Rosa salvaje (Spanish pronunciation: [ˈrosa salˈβaxe]; English title: Wild Rose) is a Mexican telenovela produced by Valentín Pimstein for Televisa. The telenovela premiered on Canal de las Estrellas on July 6, 1987 and ran for 199 episodes until April 8, 1988. This telenovela was a huge success in Armenia, Nigeria, Mexico, Japan, Kenya, Latin America, Italy, Bulgaria, Croatia, Serbia, Bosnia and Herzegovina, Russia, Estonia, South Korea, Ukraine, Taiwan, India, Canada the United States and Indonesia.

Verónica Castro and Guillermo Capetillo starred as the protagonists, while Laura Zapata, Liliana Abud and Edith González starred as the antagonists. Edith González was later replaced by Felicia Mercado midway through the telenovela.

== Cast ==
=== Main ===
- Verónica Castro as Rosa García
- Guillermo Capetillo as Ricardo Linares / Rogelio Linares

=== Recurring ===
- Laura Zapata as Dulcina Linares
- Liliana Abud as Cándida Linares
- Claudio Báez as Federico Robles
- Armando Calvo as Sebastián
- Josefina Escobedo as Felipa González
- Edith González as Leonela Villarreal #1
- Felicia Mercado as Leonela Villarreal #2
- Magda Guzmán as Tomasa Gonzalez
- Alexandro Landero as Rigoberto Camacho Sánchez
- Mariana Levy as Erlinda González
- Irma Lozano as Paulette Montero de Mendizábal
- Alberto Mayagoitia as Pablo Mendizábal
- Gloria Morell as Eduvigez
- Beatriz Ornellas as Caridad
- Patricia Pereyra as Norma
- Renata Flores as Leopoldina
- Gastón Tuset as Roque Mendizábal
- Antonio Valencia as Guest in the house of the Linares family
- Liliana Weimer as Vanessa de Reynoso
- Rossana Cesarman as Celia
- Eduardo Borja as Hilario
- Arturo Guízar as Rufino
- Ari Telch as Jorge Andueza
- Carmen Cortés as Doña Filomena
- Jorge Granillo as Palillo
- Tito Livio Baccarin as Tito
- Julio Andrés López as Périco
- Adrián Martínez as Adrián "El Muelas"
- Meche Barba as Sor Mercedes

== Episodes ==
The following is a list of episodes published by Blim. In the list of episodes are available only 11 episodes.

No.	Title	Length (minutes)
1	"Ricardo y Rosa"	61 min
Dulcina and Leopoldina want to put Rosa in jail for stealing plums, but she finds an unlikely savior.
2	"Huir del sufrimiento"	62 min
Rosa has suffered greatly from the cruelty of Ricardo's sisters and decides to leave.
3	"Palabras de alcohol"	58 min
Rosa tries to deal with Dulcina's insinuation. Did Ricardo marry her without loving her?
4	"La confesión de Paulette"	62 min
5	"La hija de Cándida"	63 min
6	"Fuera de mi camino"	61 min
7	"La culpa del muñeco"	61 min
8	"Manzanillo"	62 min
9	"La trampa de Dulcina"	59 min
10	"Cada centavo"	62 min
11	"La oferta"	55 min

== Awards and nominations ==
Year	Award	Category	Nominee	Result
1988	6th TVyNovelas Awards	Best Actress	Verónica Castro	Won
1988	6th TVyNovelas Awards	Best Actor	Guillermo Capetillo	Nominated
1988	6th TVyNovelas Awards	Best Antagonist Actress	Laura Zapata	Won
