= Al diablo con los guapos =

Mexican telenovela

- Genre: Telenovela
- Created by: Juan Carlos Alcalá
- Based on: Muñeca Brava by Enrique Torres
- Screenplay by: Fermín Zúñiga
- Directed by: Sergio Cataño; Alejandro Gamboa
- Starring: Laura Flores; César Évora; Allisson Lozz; Eugenio Siller; Andrés Zuno
- Music by: Jorge Eduardo Murguía; Alejandro De La Parra; Mauricio Arriaga
- Opening theme: "Al diablo con los guapos" performed by K-Paz de la Sierra and Allisson Lozz
- Country of origin: Mexico
- Original language: Spanish
- No. of episodes: 175

Production
- Executive producer: Angelli Nesma Medina
- Producers: Ignacio Alarcón; Esteban Azuela; Eduardo Ricalo
- Cinematography: Armando Zafra
- Editors: Octavio López; Daniel Rentería
- Production company: Televisa

Original release
- Network: Canal de las Estrellas
- Release: October 8, 2007 – June 6, 2008

Al diablo con los guapos (English title: Down with the Beautiful) is a Mexican telenovela produced by Angelli Nesma Medina for Televisa. It aired on Canal de las Estrellas from October 8, 2007, to June 6, 2008. It is a remake of Argentinian telenovela Muñeca Brava. It stars Allisson Lozz, Eugenio Siller, Laura Flores, César Évora, and Andrés Zuno. In the United States, the telenovela aired on Univision from January 21, 2008, to September 19, 2008.

== Plot ==
Al Diablo con los Guapos tells the story of a girl named Milagros, who, at the age 18, leaves the convent where she was raised and finds work with Regina Belmonte, the matriarch of a family company. Regina sympathizes with Milagros immediately but the remainder of the family does not bear her self-assured character and bad manners.

The son of Constancio Belmonte, Alejandro, is interested in Milagros because of her captivating spirit. Little by little, between suits and discussions, the two begin to date, although Milagros refuses to accept him. She knows Alejandro's reputation of being a womanizer and believes she is going to be abandoned like her mother. Besides this, Alejandro is already engaged.

Constancio Belmonte, Regina's son, detests his family and does not even try hide it. Especially to his wife Luciana, since his father obliged him to marry her which in turn separated him from Rosario, the love of his life. At the time, she was expecting a baby of his, but she disappeared without leaving a trace. As soon as he learned this, Constancio did not try to locate his child who ended up to be Milagros.

Andrea, Alejandro's girlfriend, only wants him for his money, and at the same time is having an affair with Constancio whom she says she loves. Hugo, Alejandro's cousin, is in love with Mili and paints portraits of her that he admires, he also fakes broken leg injury to get closer to her but later confesses his love.

After confessing their love for one another, they are faced with much opposition. Andrea & Hugo make it their mission to separate them, making many plans to ensure that happens. However their plots failed and Alejandro and Milagros are together. But later Alejandro meets Florencia, the daughter of his father's business partner. They begin to take a liking to each other and eventually go out while Alejandro still harbors feeling for Mili. While this is happening Mili begins to get jealous and then tries to sabotage their relationship which causes all of them to have a fight. But in the end Alejandro is still deeply in love with Mili they try to get married until Alejandro's mother Luciana sabotages their plans. Luciana lies to Mili saying that they are related and reveals that her father is Constancio.

Eventually Mili marries Hugo. Alejandro marries Florencia and they have a little girl, Rosario. Many problems arise in their marriage eventually leaving both Alejandro and Florencia unhappy and miserable. Mili and Hugo are as well unhappy because Hugo wants Mili to love him but she is still in love with Alejandro. Hugo then starts cheating on her with the maid Karla. Mili finds out she is not related to Alejandro and they begin their romance again.

Hugo finally gives Mili a divorce. Florencia leaves Alejandro for her ex-husband while leaving Alejandro with their daughter, Rosario. In the end, Florencia is shot to death by her ex-husband.

Mili's mother Rosario returns to find everyone in shock because she was presumed dead.

Days pass by and Mili marries Alejandro, Karla marries Hugo and Valeria marries Rocky as a triple wedding. then many years later the novel shows how time passes by between the married couples and they start to have kids and grandkids.

At the end, it shows a beach scene with Mili and Alejandro walking together at a very old age while remembering that afternoon that they had sex on the beach and suddenly they die together.

== Cast ==
=== Main ===
- Laura Flores as Luciana Arango
- César Évora as Constancio Belmonte
- Allisson Lozz as Milagros "Mili" Lascurain/Milagros "Mili" Belmonte de Miranda
- Eugenio Siller as Alejandro Belmonte/Alejandro Miranda Arango
- Alicia Rodríguez as Regina Lascuraín viuda de Belmonte
- Altair Jarabo as Valeria Belmonte Arango de Juárez
- Ricardo Margaleff as Ricardo "Rocky" Juárez "Morgan"
- Margarita Magaña as Karla Luna de Arango
- Andres Zuno as Hugo Arango Tamayo
- Michelle Ramaglia as Lina de Senderos
- Rafael León de los Cobos as Roberto "Bobby" Senderos
- Georgina Salgado as Gloria
- Ramon Valdez as Chamuco
- Marco Muñoz as Damián Arango
- Tania Vazquez as Andrea Castillo Riquelme
- Luz Maria Jerez as Milena de Senderos
- Alfonso Iturralde as Eugenio Senderos
- Dacia González as Madre
- Miguel Pizarro (actor) as Braulio Ramos
- José Luis Cordero as Horacio
- Carlos Cobos as Padre Manuel
- Leticia Perdigón as Socorro Luna/Amparo Rodríguez
- Mónika Sánchez as Young Rosario Ramos
- Maribel Guardia as Rosella Dillano/Rosario Ramos
- Rossana San Juan as Roxana
- Andrea García as Zulema
- Eduardo Liñán as Armando Calvillo
- Arsenio Campos as Peralta
- Fabián Lavalle as Instructor de Modelos
- Sheyla as Sor "Cachete" Catalina and Macarena
- Juan Peláez as Federico Belmonte
- Fabian Robles as Rigoberto
- Aitor Iturriz as Mateo Roblero
- Eduardo Antonio as Silvestre
- Nora Velázquez as Bloody Mary
- Gustavo Rojo as Lic. Ernesto
- Roberto Vander as Néstor Miranda
- Ricardo Fastlicht as Paolo
- Ariadne Díaz as Florencia Echevarria de Belmonte
- Manuela Ímaz as Marisela Echevarría
- Gloria Sierra as Nefertiti
- Daniel Ducoing as Ramses
