= Andrés Zuno =

Mexican actor and singer

- Born: November 7, 1982 (age 43); Mexico City, Mexico
- Other names: Andy Zuno
- Occupations: Actor, singer
- Years active: 2001–present

Andrés Zuno (born November 7, 1982) is a Mexican actor and singer. Known for being the first mexican actor to star in an American Soap Opera The Bold and the Beautiful. Also known for his starring role as Esteban in Todo por Lucy, the latin remake of the TV classic I Love Lucy for Amazon Studios. He played Hugo in one of the most successful telenovelas of all time in the United States Al Diablo con los Guapos also for the recurring role of Plutarco in the first and second seasons of the Telemundo super-series Señora Acero, and for his roles in the Televisa's number one hit telenovelas such as La doble vida de Estela Carrillo and Papá a toda madre, where he played the first gay character to be legally married in mexican television. He is also member of the original cast of Mexico’s smash musical Mentiras el musical and the author and producer of the novel and play Los Hijos También Lloran. As a singer Andy Zuno as he is also known, he has recorded 4 albums, Más de Una Vida, Sueños Para Compartir, DiscoStereoPop, RadioRetroPop and his latest album in which he makes a debut in the Regional Mexicano movement Soy Tu Amante.

== Filmography ==
=== Film roles ===
| Year | Title | Roles | Notes |
|---|---|---|---|
| 2013 | Go for Sisters | Immigration Officer | |
| 2016 | Treintona, soltera y fantástica | Chavo Antro | |
| 2016 | Macho | Reportero desfile | |
| 2022 | Después | Héctor | |
| 2023 | ¿Quieres ser… mi Hijo? | Oliver | |
| 2025 | A-Marte | Fernando | |

=== Television roles ===
| Year | Title | Roles | Notes |
|---|---|---|---|
| 2002 | La otra | Fotógrafo | 1 episode |
| 2007 | Pasión | Bernabé | |
| 2007–2008 | Al diablo con los guapos | Hugo Arango Tamayo | |
| 2011 | Amar de nuevo | Lorenzo | |
| 2013 | The Bold and the Beautiful | Rafael | Recurring role; 21 episodes |
| 2014–2015 | Señora Acero | Plutarco | Series regular (seasons 1–2); 36 episodes |
| 2017 | La doble vida de Estela Carrillo | Tom | Series regular (season 1); 68 episodes |
| 2017–2018 | Papá a toda madre | Rafael Restrepo | Series regular; 96 episodes |
| 2019 | Club de Cuervos | Actor Sensual | Episode: "Diego Villalobos" |
| 2022 | Todo por Lucy Season 1 | Esteban | Series regular; 10 episodes Season one |
| 2022 | Todo por Lucy Season 2 | Esteban | Series regular; 10 episodes Season two |

== Discography ==
| Year | Title | Roles | Notes |
|---|---|---|---|
| 2009 | Mentiras el Musical | | |
| 2011 | Más de Una Vida | | |
| 2013 | Sueños Para Compartir | | |
| 2021 | DiscoStereoPop | | |
| 2022 | RadioRetroPop | | |
| 2024 | Soy Tu Amante | | |
| 2026 | Esto No Ha Terminado | | |
