= Raúl Valerio =

Mexican actor (1927–2017)

Raúl Valerio (January 1, 1927 - January 25, 2017) was a Mexican actor.

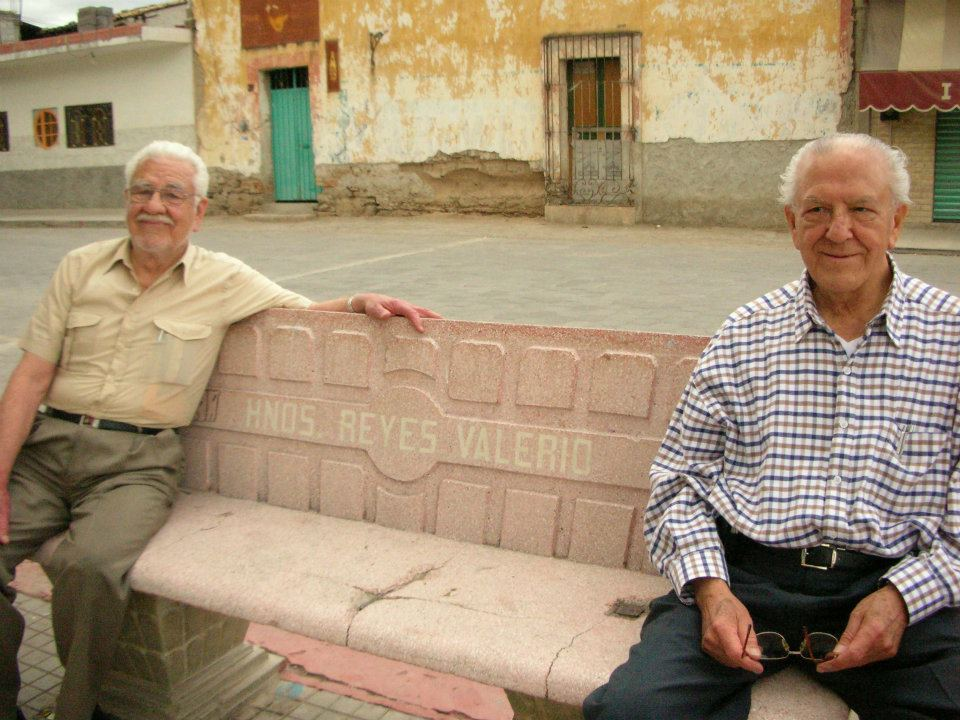
Raul Valerio and his brother Constantino Reyes-Valerio

Raúl Valerio (born Raúl Reyes-Valerio) was born in the town of Zinacatepec, in the Mexican state of Puebla where he learned to speak both Spanish and Nahuatl. He attended the local primary school "Ignacio Zaragoza", also attended by his brother Constantino Reyes-Valerio.

He appeared in multiple Mexican "telenovelas" (Por tu amor (telenovela), Clase 406, La Verdad Oculta, Imperio de Cristal, Querida enemiga,¿Y ahora qué hago?, Mujer, casos de la vida real), films (Sólo Con Tu Pareja, El Imperio de la Fortuna, Te presento a Laura).

He was very active in theatre in plays like "Tirano Banderas" acting along Ignacio López Tarso and "Los Dos Hermanos" written by Felipe Santander. His most famous role has been as the Comendador in Don Juan Tenorio where he has appeared with Gonzalo Vega, Javier Diaz-Dueñas and Gonzalo Correa.

He appeared and wrote the Náhuatl-script for the 1997 film Santo Luzbel, directed by Miguel Sabido, which was mainly spoken in Náhuatl.

He died on January 25, 2017, in Mexico City and was buried in San Sebastian Zinacatepec, Puebla, Mexico.
