= Sebastián Zurita =

Mexican actor

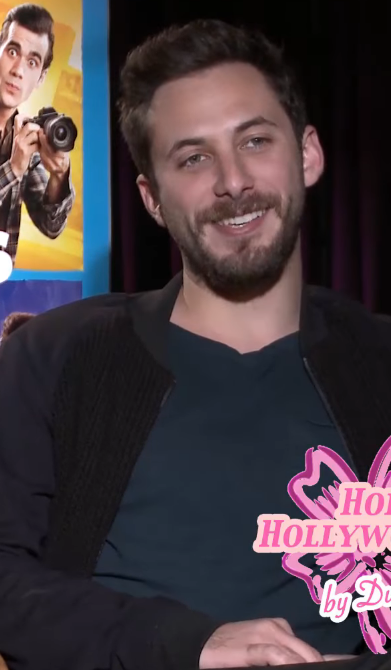
- Born: Sebastián Zurita Bach; Mexico City, Mexico
- Occupation: Actor
- Years active: 1996, 2008–present
- Parents: Humberto Zurita (father); Christian Bach (mother)
- Relatives: Emiliano Zurita (brother)

Sebastián Zurita Bach is a Mexican actor, known for his roles in Mexican telenovelas like En nombre del amor (2008), Cuando me enamoro (2010), and Netflix series like El juego de las llaves (2019) and Cómo sobrevivir soltero (2020).

== Early life ==
Sebastián Zurita Bach is the eldest son of actors Humberto Zurita and Christian Bach.

== Career ==
Bach made his acting debut as a child, appearing in Cañaveral de Pasiones (1996) as young Pablo Montero.

He returned to television in En Nombre del Amor (2008) as Emiliano Saenz. A year later, Zurita joined the cast of the 2009 remake of the telenovela Corazón Salvaje, inspired by the original 1956 novel by Caridad Bravo Adams. He also starred in the 2010 film Ángel Caído, along with his father and younger brother Emiliano Zurita.

== Filmography ==
Film roles
Year	Title	Role	Notes
2010	Ángel caído	Liutprando	
2013	Ciudadano Buelna	Rafael Buelna	
2014	Amor de mis amores	León	
2014	Eddie Reynolds y los ángeles de acero	Tony Rivas	
2015	Una selfie	Rafa	Short film
2016	I Was There	Franky	Executive producer
2016	Juego de héroes	Luis	
2017	3 idiotas	Emiliano	
2017	Cómo cortar a tu patán	Pepe	
2018	Todo mal	Masiosare	
2018	Si yo fuera tú	Marcos	
2026	Todo lo que nunca fuimos	Oliver	

Television roles
Year	Title	Role	Notes
1996	Cañaveral de pasiones	Pablo Montero Rosales (child)	2 episodes
2008	En nombre del amor	Emiliano Sáenz Noriega	Main role; 169 episodes
2009	Corazón salvaje	Gabriel Álvarez	Main role; 135 episodes
2010	Cuando me enamoro	Rafael Gutiérrez	Recurring role; 5 episodes
2010	Mujeres asesinas	Franco	Episode: "Eliana, Cuñada"
2014	La impostora	Eduardo Altamira	Main role; 120 episodes
2015	Lo imperdonable	Pablo Hidalgo	Main role; 114 episodes
2019	The Oath	Ricardo Velazquez	Recurring role (season 2); 8 episodes
2019	El juego de las llaves	Sergio Morales	Main role; 10 episodes
2020	Cómo sobrevivir soltero	Sebastián	Main role and creator
2021	Luis Miguel: The Series	Adult Alex Basteri	Season 3
2023	The Lost Flowers of Alice Hart	Dylan	5 episodes
2024	Profe infiltrado	Maldonado	

== Awards and nominations ==
Year	Award	Category	Work	Result
2009	Premios People en Español	Best Young Actor	En nombre del amor	Nominated
2009	Premios People en Español	Best Couple (with Allisson Lozz)	En nombre del amor	Won
2010	Premios People en Español	Best Young Actor	Corazón salvaje	Nominated
2010	TVyNovelas Awards	Best Male Revelation	En nombre del amor	Won
2014	Premios Diosa de Plata	Best Actor	Ciudadano Buelna	Won
