= Al rojo vivo (1980 TV series) =

- Genre: Telenovela; Drama
- Created by: María Zarattini; José Rendón
- Directed by: Alfredo Saldaña
- Starring: Alma Muriel; Frank Moro; Silvia Pasquel; Miguel Palmer; Carlos Ancira; Victoria Ruffo
- Country of origin: Mexico
- Original language: Spanish
- No. of episodes: 180

Production
- Executive producer: Ernesto Alonso
- Production locations: Mexico City, Mexico
- Running time: 21-22 minutes
- Production company: Televisa

Original release
- Network: Canal de las Estrellas
- Release: 1980 – 1981

Related
- El precio de tu amor (2000–2001)

Al rojo vivo (English title: Red Hot) is a Mexican telenovela directed by Alfredo Saldaña and produced by Ernesto Alonso for Televisa in 1980.

Alma Muriel and Frank Moro starred as protagonists, while Silvia Pasquel, Miguel Palmer and Carlos Ancira starred as main antagonists.

== Cast ==
- Alma Muriel as Liliana
- Frank Moro as Jorge
- Silvia Pasquel as Ana Cristina "Tina" Segovia
- Miguel Palmer as Alfredo Álvarez
- Carlos Ancira as Francisco
- Victoria Ruffo as Pilar Álvarez
- Napoleón as Benito
- Aarón Hernán as Julio Segovia
- Gloria Marín as Margarita
- Leticia Perdigón as Emilia
- Emilia Carranza as Laura
- Malena Doria as Adelaida
- Ignacio Rubiell as Nacho
- Álvaro Dávila as Álvaro
- Roberto Antúnez as Filiberto
- Antonio Valencia
- Ada Carrasco
- Gustavo del Castillo
- Héctor Flores
- Antonio Miguel
