= Allisson Lozz =

Mexican actress and singer

- Born: Allisson Marian Lozano Núñez; August 1, 1992 (age 33); Chihuahua, Mexico
- Other name: Alisson Lozano
- Occupations: Former singer, actress, model
- Spouse: Eliu Gutierrez (m. 2011)
- Children: 2
- Musical career
- Genres: Pop, Mexican pop
- Instrument: Vocal
- Years active: 2002–2010
- Website: allissonlozz.com (archived)

Allisson Marian Gutiérrez (née Lozano Núñez; born August 1, 1992), better known as Allisson Lozz, is a Mexican former actress, model and singer. She is best known for her roles in the Mexican telenovelas Mision S.O.S as Diana, in Rebelde as Bianca, in Al Diablo con los Guapos as Milagros, and En Nombre del Amor as Paloma.

Lozano started her career on television with the program Código F.A.M.A. She received her first opportunity to play an adult main character on Al Diablo con los Guapos, which became a popular daytime telenovela. She performed her song, No Me Supiste Querer, with K-Paz de la Sierra on April 27, 2008, at Premios TVyNovelas.

Lozano appears in the videoclip for Carita Bonita by reggaeton duo Erre XI. In 2010, after the success of En Nombre del Amor, Lozano retired from acting, having become a Jehovah's Witness. On January 15, 2011, she married Eliu Gutiérrez. She currently lives in Colorado, United States, and has two daughters, London Rose and Sydney. She also is an Independent Sales Director for Mary Kay Cosmetics, and does not go by the name of Allisson Lozano, she now goes by Allisson Gutierrez.

== Telenovelas ==
Year	Title	Role	Notes
2003–04	Alegrijes y Rebujos	Allison Rebolledo	Antagonist
2004–05	Mision S.O.S	Diana Lozano	Protagonist
2005–06	Rebelde	Bianca Delight Abril	Recurring Character
2006–07	Las Dos Caras de Ana	Paulina Gardel Durán	Supporting Role
2007–08	Al Diablo con los Guapos	Milagros "Mili" Ramos / Milagros Belmonte Ramos Arango de Miranda	Protagonist
2008–09	En nombre del amor	Paloma Espinoza de los Monteros Diaz / Paloma Espinoza de los Monteros de Saenz	Protagonist

== TV programs ==
Year	Title	Role	Notes
2002–03	Código F.A.M.A.	Herself	Contestant
2005	La energía de Sonric'slandia	Herself / Leta	Host
2005–10	Vecinos	Brenda	1 episode
2006	Amor Mío	Luz Valenzuela	
2007	Objetos Perdidos	Various characters	
2007	RBD: season 2	Bianca	Various episodes
2007	50 Años de la telenovela: Mentiras y Verdades	Guest	
2008	La Rosa De Guadalupe	Kika	Episode: Kika, la reguetonera

== Discography ==
- Misión S.O.S. Especial de Navidad
- Misión S.O.S
- Disco Alegrije
- Disco Rebujo
- Navidad Alegrije
- Navidad Rebujo
- Código F.A.M.A.
- Proyecto Estrella

== Awards and nominations ==
=== Premios TVyNovelas ===
Year	Category	Telenovela	Result
2009	Best Young Lead Actress	Al diablo con los guapos	Nominated

=== Premios People en Español ===
Year	Category	Telenovela	Result
2009	Best Couple with Sebastián Zurita	En nombre del amor	Nominated
2009	Best Young Actress	En nombre del amor	Won

- 2009: Named by the magazine People en Español as one of "Los 50 más bellos".
