= Blanca Sánchez =

Mexican actress (1946–2010)

- Born: Blanca Aurora Sánchez de la Fuente; March 2, 1946; Mexico City, Mexico
- Died: January 7, 2010 (aged 63); Mexico City, Mexico
- Occupation: Actress
- Years active: 1957–2010
- Parent(s): Luis Sánchez Silva; Ofelia de la Fuente

Blanca Sánchez (March 2, 1946 – January 7, 2010) was a Mexican character actress, the daughter of Luis Sánchez Silva and Ofelia de la Fuente.

She appeared in several telenovelas such as Quinceañera and Luz y sombra. Her film work included such films as Tiempo de morir, Cuando los hijos se van, Yo soy Chucho el Roto, and Mamá Dolores.

Sánchez died in 2010, aged 63, in Mexico City, from undisclosed causes.
