= Amor a la medida =

- Directed by: Raúl Araiza
- Screenplay by: Raúl Araiza; Francisco Sánchez
- Story by: Enrique Franco; María Amparo Escandón
- Starring: Los Tigres del Norte
- Cinematography: Gastón Hurtado
- Edited by: Javier Patiño
- Music by: Osnib Cassab
- Production company: Televicine S.A. de C.V.
- Release date: 19 November 1993 (Mexico)
- Running time: 99 minutes
- Country: Mexico
- Language: Spanish

Amor a la medida, (English: "Tailored Love") also known as El sastre, (English: "The Tailor") is a 1993 Mexican musical romantic drama film directed by Raúl Araiza and starring Los Tigres del Norte. It features a plot based on the 1950 Mexican film Vagabunda.

It is the last feature film that Los Tigres del Norte starred in after appearing in films since 1978; subsequent productions they would appear in were recordings of their concerts.

== Plot ==
The musical band Los Tigres del Norte record an album. During the recordings, one of the members watches the film Vagabunda on television. Afterwards, he gets involved in a love affair with a woman with a dark past. At the end, it is revealed that the events of the film were a dream that the bandmember had after having fallen asleep while watching Vagabunda, whose plot is similar to his affair with the woman from his dream.

== Cast ==
- Los Tigres del Norte
  - Jorge Hernández as Jorge
  - Hernán Hernández as Hernán
  - Raúl Hernández as Raul
  - Eduardo Hernández Moncada as Eduardo
  - Óscar Lara as Oscar
- Julieta Rosen as María Elena
- Claudia Guzmán as Vicky
- Humberto Elizondo as Ernesto Franco
- Raúl Padilla "Chóforo" as Ulises
- Bruno Rey as Gonzalo
- Alberto Pedret as León
- Ignacio Retes as Don Nacho
- César Sobrevals
- Paco Stanley as himself
- Victor Tolosa
- Ruben Cuellar
- Patricia Mayer
- Martha Covarrubias
