= Madres egoístas =

- Genre: Telenovela; Romance; Drama
- Created by: Mimí Bechelani
- Written by: Josefina Palos y Romo; Luis Fernando Martínez
- Directed by: Salvador Sánchez; Philippe Amand; Angélica Aragón
- Starring: Julieta Rosen; Enrique Novi; Orlando Carrió; Chantal Andere; María del Sol; Toño Mauri; Alberto Mayagoitia
- Opening theme: Madres egoístas by Ernesto Cortázar II; Volver a ti by María del Sol
- Country of origin: Mexico
- Original language: Spanish
- No. of episodes: 80

Production
- Executive producer: Juan Osorio
- Cinematography: Alejandro Frutos; Roberto Nino
- Running time: 41-44 minutes
- Production company: Televisa

Original release
- Network: Canal de las Estrellas
- Release: February 4 – June 7, 1991

Related
- Ángeles blancos; Yo no creo en los hombres; Madres egoístas (1963)

Madres egoístas (Selfish mothers) is a Mexican telenovela produced by Juan Osorio for Televisa in 1991.

Enrique Novi, Julieta Rosen, Chantal Andere, and Orlando Carrió starred as the protagonists, while Alberto Mayagoitia and María del Sol starred as the main antagonists.

== Plot ==
Raquel Rivas Cantú, a young orphan and heir to a great fortune, is raised by her housekeeper, Mariana. Mariana is resentful of Raquel because she believes the Rivas Cantú family stole the life she deserved. Raquel eventually marries an honest widower named Pablo. Pablo has a daughter, Carmen, who is studying at a private boarding school.

Raquel and Pablo have another daughter, Gaby. Pablo begins to suspect that Mariana is not the person she appears to be, so he puts Gaby in the care of a nanny on the condition that Mariana never gets close to her.

After four years of immense happiness, one day Mariana sits Gaby down to play in the middle of the street. While driving home, Pablo almost runs over Gaby but manages to see her in time to avoid her. Gaby is not harmed but the shock causes Pablo to have a fatal heart attack, leaving Raquel and Gaby alone. Raquel takes Mariana's advice, given in bad faith, to enroll Gaby in a private boarding school. At this school, Gaby meets Carmen and the two grow up together without knowing they are half-sisters.

Mariana and her son, Felipe, make the life of the Rivas Cantús a nightmare. However, several characters show up later and provide an unexpected turn to this story of love, revenge, and betrayal.

== Cast ==
- Julieta Rosen as Raquel Rivas Cantú
- Enrique Novi as Pablo Ledesma
- Orlando Carrió as Víctor Peralta
- Chantal Andere as Carmen Ledesma Arriaga
- María del Sol as Mariana González/Magdalena González/Catalina/Dolores
- Alberto Mayagoitia as Fernando González/Felipe Godoy/Fernando Rivas-Cantú González
- Toño Mauri as Maximiliano "Max" Báez
- Laura Sotelo as Ivonne/Dora Silvana
- Lilian Macías as Gabriela "Gaby" Ledesma Rivas-Cantú
- Oscar Servin as Refugio "Cuca"
- Manolita Saval as Rosario Urióstegui
- Roberto Cañedo as Joaquín Urióstegui
- Tere Valadez as Ofelia
- Rafael Amador as Gerardo
- Anahí as Gabriela "Gaby" Cantú (child)
- Dina de Marco as Jacinta Arriaga
- Justo Martínez as Severo Arriaga
- Roberto Sosa as Salvador "Chava" Godinez
- Maty Huitrón as Mina Báez
- Claudio Obregón as Alberto Báez
- Gerardo Acuña as Raymundo Cooper
- Diana Golden as Ana Cervantes
- Fernando Colunga as Jorge
- Laura Martí as Sara Báez
- Tere Mondragón as Rufina Noriega
- Norma De Anda as Inés
- Maricruz Nájera as Natalia Blinder
- Rafael del Villar as Héctor Cruz
- Gustavo Navarro as Hugo Peralta
- Lucía Hernández as Iris
- Héctor Cruz Lara as Horacio
- Jalil Succar as Antonio
- Antonio Miguel as Lucio
- Alicia Osorio as Maestra Lilia Rangel
- Grecia as Maestra Alarcón
- Gabriela Michell as Maestra Piedad
- Irina Areu as Ms. Ferriz
- Renata de los Ríos as Aurora
- Denisse Castillo as Cata
- Alexandra Pérez as Flora
- Chantal Guedy as Ema
- Ondina as Celeste
- Roberto Garza Leal as Alfredo
- Yuliana Peniche as Carmen (child)
- Jair de Rubín as Hugo (child)
- Carlos Fuentes as Maximiliano (child)
- Salvador González as Chava (child)
- Paola Rojas as Carmen (newborn)
- Leonor Llausás as Josefa
- Leonor Bonilla as Avelina
- Miguel Gutiérrez as Olegario
- Scarlet Maceira as Rosenda
- Guillermo Larrea as Memo'
- Guillermo Rivas as Bonifacio "Boni" Salgado
- Tony Marcín as Rosaura
- Jeannette Candiani as Maribel
- David Montenegro as Salvador Martín del Campo
- Alejandro del Castillo as Teniente Hernández
- John Pike as Gómez Williams
- Nubel Espino as Dr. Albores
- Mario Iván Martínez as Iván Escandón
- Philippe Amand as Pierre
- Roque Casanova as Polignac
- Lizbeth Ramirez as Rosaly
- Bruno Schwebel as Mr. Duvall
- Tara Parra as Sol Deschamps
- Carlos Espinoza as Dr. Pizano
- Roberto Estrada as Lic. Torres
- Lilian Davis as Alicia
- Mario Erosa as Bank manager
- Laura Zaizar as Mrs. Landis
- Rosalba Castellanos as Paca
- Helio Castillo as Gaby's Teacher
- Carl Hillos as Manuel
- José Olivares as Pancho
- Marisol Cazzaro as Joaquina
- Ángel Heredia as Doctor of Red Cross
- Arnoldo Picasso as Carlos
- Walter Medina as Raúl
- Anabel Pompa as Lilia
- Mauricio Bonet as Pollo
- Beatriz Zazueta as Estela
- Roberto Ruy as Lic. Mendoza
- Sagrario Baena as Amalia de Ramírez
- Miguel Gómez Checa as Álvarez
- Diana Torres as Adriana Nava
- Fernando Pinkus as Sergio
- Grace Nenna as Niebla
- Enrique Hidalgo as Dr. Schultz
- Judith Velasco Herrera as Lic. Pilar Zaldain
- Cynthia Zurita as Blanca
- Dora Luz Alcalá as Herlinda
- Alejandro Villeli as Dr. Martínez
- Tere Suárez as Mrs. Monasterios
- Astrid Margarita as Lidia
- Galia Larrea as Nurse
- Patricia Hernández as Nurse
- Guillermo Puente as Counselor
- Licia Suárez as Elena
- Federico Valdés as Auditor
- Miguel Serros as Agent #1
- Rubén Herrera as Agente #2
