= 12th TVyNovelas Awards =

1994 Mexican TV awards

- Date: April 29, 1994
- Location: México D.F.
- Hosted by: Raúl Velasco

Highlights
- Most awards: Corazón salvaje (10)
- Most nominations: Corazón salvaje (13)

Television/radio coverage
- Network: Canal de las Estrellas

The 12th TVyNovelas Awards were an academy of special awards to the best soap operas and TV shows. The awards ceremony took place on April 29, 1994, in México D.F. The ceremony was televised in Mexico by Canal de las Estrellas.

Raúl Velasco hosted the show. Corazón salvaje won 10 awards, the most for the evening, including Best Telenovela. Other winners Dos mujeres, un camino won 3 awards, Los parientes pobres won 2 awards and Capricho and Entre la vida y la muerte won 1 each.

== Summary of awards and nominations ==
Telenovela	Nominations	Awards
Corazón salvaje	13	10
Los parientes pobres	8	2
Dos mujeres, un camino	6	3
Capricho	3	1
Más allá del puente	3	0
Entre la vida y la muerte	2	1
Buscando el paraíso	2	0
Valentina	2	0
Clarisa	1	0
Sueño de amor	1	0

== Winners and nominees ==
=== Telenovelas ===
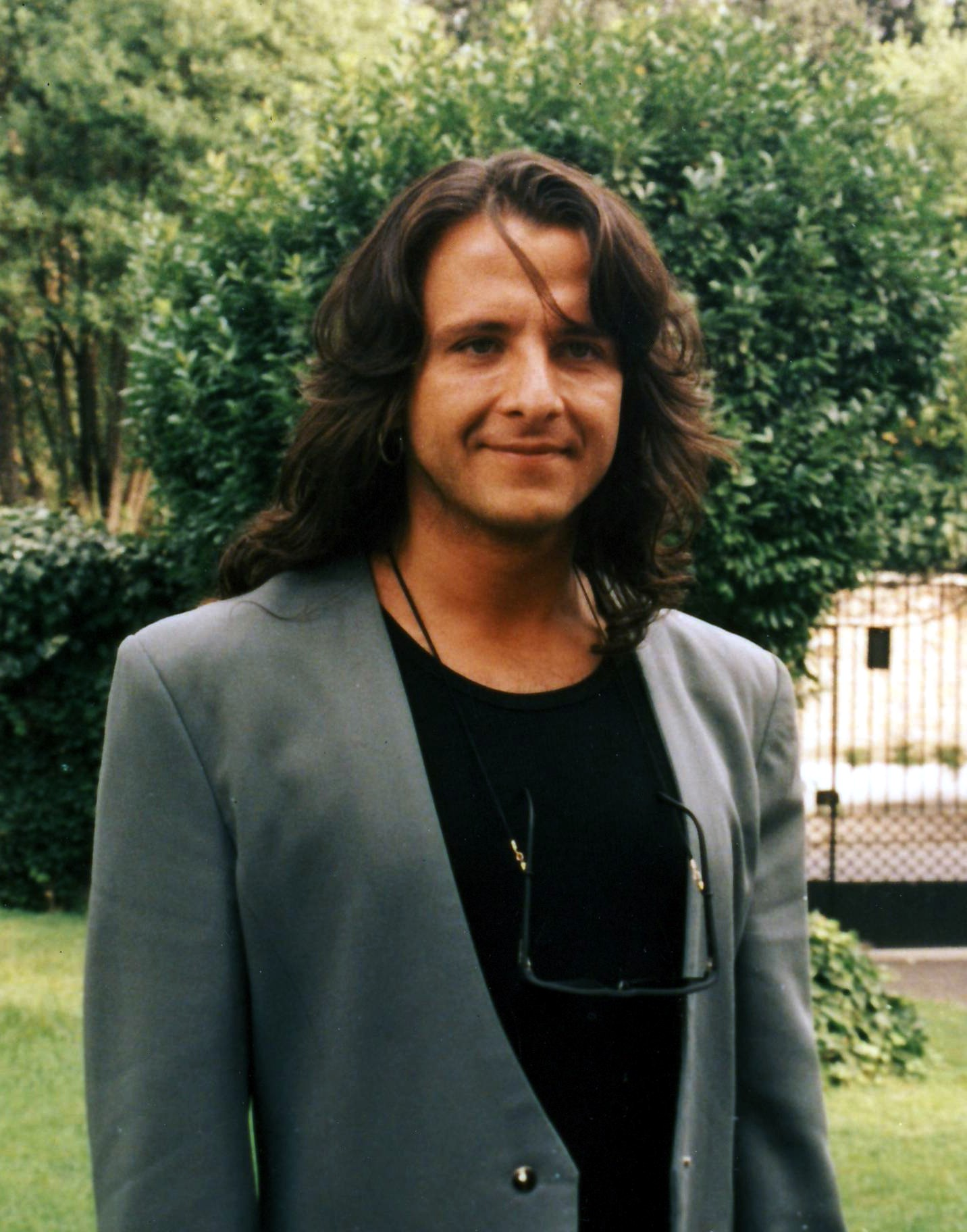
Eduardo Palomo, winner for Best Actor.

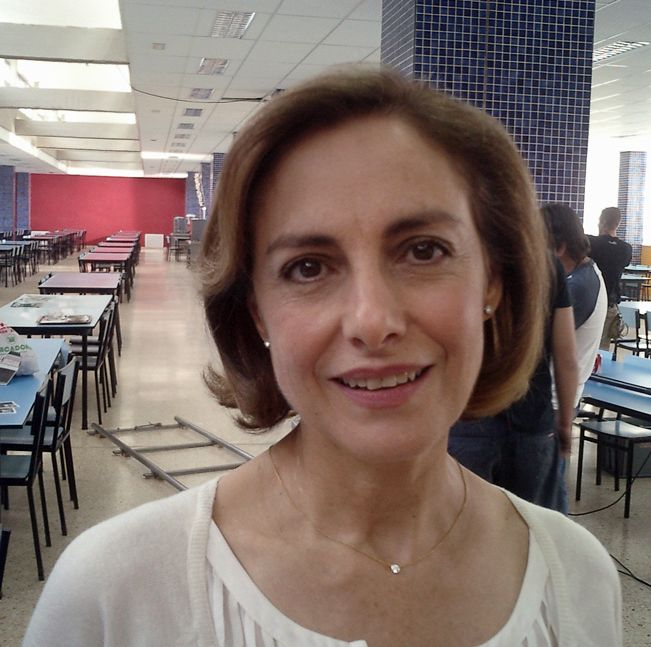
Diana Bracho, winner for Best Antagonist Actress.

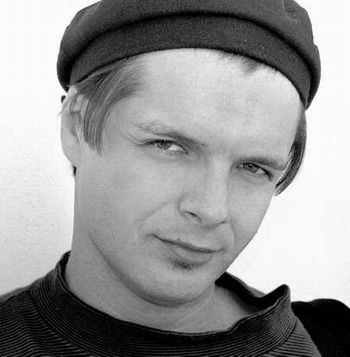
Ariel López Padilla, winner for Best Male Revelation.

Best Telenovela	Best Musical Theme
Corazón salvaje; Dos mujeres, un camino; Los parientes pobres	"Corazón salvaje" — Mijares – Corazón salvaje; "Buscando el paraíso" — Pedro Fernández and Alejandro Ibarra – Buscando el paraíso; "Los parientes pobres" — Lucero – Los parientes pobres
Best Actress	Best Actor
Edith González – Corazón salvaje; Leticia Calderon – Entre la vida y la muerte; Victoria Ruffo – Capricho	Eduardo Palomo – Corazón salvaje; Ernesto Laguardia – Los parientes pobres; Juan Ferrara – Valentina
Best Antagonist Actress	Best Antagonist Actor
Diana Bracho – Capricho; Chantal Andere – Los parientes pobres; Laura Flores – Clarisa	Sebastián Ligarde – Entre la vida y la muerte; Enrique Rocha – Dos mujeres, un camino; Humberto Elizondo – Los parientes pobres
Best Leading Actress	Best Leading Actor
Claudia Islas – Corazón salvaje; Alicia Montoya – Valentina; María Teresa Rivas – Capricho	Enrique Rocha – Dos mujeres, un camino; Enrique Lizalde – Corazón salvaje; Joaquín Cordero – Los parientes pobres
Best Young Lead Actress	Best Young Lead Actor
Lucero – Los parientes pobres; Arcelia Ramírez – Más allá del puente; Itatí Cantoral – Dos mujeres, un camino	Rodrigo Vidal – Dos mujeres, un camino; Eduardo Santamarina – Más allá del puente; Pedro Fernández – Buscando el paraíso
Best Female Revelation	Best Male Revelation
Ana Colchero – Corazón salvaje; Angélica Rivera – Sueño de amor; Yolanda Ventura – Corazón salvaje	Ariel López Padilla – Corazón salvaje; César Évora – Corazón salvaje; Fernando Colunga – Más allá del puente
Best Original Story or Adaptation	Best Direction
María Zarattini – Corazón salvaje	Alberto Cortés – Corazón salvaje

=== Others ===
Best Comedy Program	Best Musical and Variety Program
Juntos, pero no revueltos; Al derecho y al derbez; Hasta que la muerte los separe	Siempre en domingo
Best Comedic Performance	Best Hostess
Maribel Fernández – Hasta que la muerte los separe; Lucila Mariscal – Las aventuras de Lencha; María Alicia Delgado – ¡Anabel!	Verónica Castro – Furia musical; Liza Echeverría – Galardón a los grandes; Rebecca de Alba – Un nuevo día
Best Female Singer	Best Male Singer
Lucero	Cristian Castro
Best Revelation Singer
Marcos Llunas

=== Special awards ===
- Artistic Career: Angélica María
- Film Career: Luis Aguilar
- Recognition to the Best Entertainment Program: Primer Impacto
- Telenovela with the Highest Rating: Dos mujeres, un camino

=== International Segment ===
This segment was transmitted only in the United States by Univisión:

- Most Successful Telenovela: Corazón salvaje
- Second Most Successful Telenovela: Los parientes pobres

=== Absent ===
People who did not attend the ceremony and were nominated in the shortlist in each category:

- Alicia Montoya
- Arcelia Ramírez
- Edith González
- Humberto Elizondo
- Itatí Cantoral
- Joaquin Cordero
- María Teresa Rivas
- Victoria Ruffo
