= Teresa (1989 TV series) =

- Genre: Telenovela; Romance; Drama
- Created by: Mimí Bechelani
- Written by: Silvia Castillejos; Francisco Sánchez; Jorge Sánchez Fogarty; Lucy Orozco
- Directed by: Jorge Sanchez Fogarty Antonio Serrano
- Starring: Salma Hayek; Rafael Rojas; Daniel Giménez Cacho; Miguel Pizarro; Patricia Pereyra; Patricia Reyes Spíndola; Claudio Brook
- Opening theme: Teresa by Guillermo Méndez Guiú
- Country of origin: Mexico
- Original language: Spanish
- No. of episodes: 125

Production
- Executive producer: Lucy Orozco
- Producer: Bosco Arochi
- Production locations: Mexico City, D.F., Mexico
- Cinematography: Gabriel Vázquez Bulmán; Fernando Durán
- Running time: 41-44 minutes (episodes 1-35); 21-22 minutes (episodes 36-125)
- Production company: Televisa

Original release
- Network: Canal de las Estrellas
- Release: August 7, 1989 – January 26, 1990

Related
- Teresa (1959); Teresa (2010)

Teresa (Spanish pronunciation: [teˈɾesa]) is a Mexican telenovela produced by Lucy Orozco for Televisa in 1989.

Salma Hayek starred in her first and only protagonist role in telenovelas, together with Rafael Rojas, Daniel Giménez Cacho and Miguel Pizarro. The series and several of the actresses won awards in 1989 and 1990.

== Plot ==
Teresa is a beautiful and intelligent young woman desperately seeking to get out of the grinding poverty of the neighborhood where she lives. Resentful of the miserable life that took her sister, she plans to use her beauty and intelligence to enter the world of luxury to which she wants to belong.

To this end, she enters her classmate and friend Aurora's group of friends. There she meets Aurora's cousin Raul, a young but neurotic millionaire with suicidal tendencies. Telling Raul that she is rich, coupled with her beauty, Raul becomes smitten with her. Even though he and Aurora discover that Teresa lied about her wealth, Raul is obsessed with her and forgives her.

Fearing that their opposition to the relationship will end with Raul's suicide, Aurora's parents accept the romance of Teresa and Raul. However, Teresa discovers that her deceit and ambition leads to unhappiness and loneliness.

== Cast ==
- Salma Hayek as Teresa Chavero Martínez
- Rafael Rojas as Mario Castro Guzman
- Daniel Giménez Cacho as Héctor de la Barrera
- Miguel Pizarro as Raúl Solórzano
- Patricia Pereyra as Aurora Molina
- Patricia Reyes Spíndola as Josefina Martínez de Chavero
- Claudio Brook as Don Fabián
- Mercedes Pascual as Enriqueta Martínez
- Alejandro Rábago as Armando Martínez
- Irma Dorantes as Juana
- Laura Almela as Luisa de la Barrera
- Rosa María Bianchi as Rosa Molina
- Héctor Gómez as Manuel Molina
- Nadia Haro Oliva as Eulalia Garay
- Omar Rodríguez as José Antonio Garay
- Marta Aura as Balbina
- Alfredo Sevilla as Ramón Castro
- Leonor Llausás as Gudelia
- Patricia Bernal as Esperanza
- David Ostrosky as Wilebaldo "Willy"
- Juan Carlos Bonet as José María
- Margarita Isabel as Marcela
- Araceli Aguilar as La Morena
- Jorge del Campo as Dr. Domingo Sánchez
- Antonio Escobar as Delfino
- Dora Cordero as Ceferina
- Jair De Rubín as Chamuco
- Germán Novoa as Monje
- Oscar Vallejo as Peluche
- Astrid Hadad as Margarita
- Amparo Garrido as Mariana
- Mario Iván Martínez as Sigfrido
- Rosa Elena Díaz as Lucha
- Norma Jacobi as Ana Celeste

== Awards ==
| Year | Award | Category | Nominee | Result |
|---|---|---|---|---|
| 1989 | Premios El Heraldo de México | Best Revelation | Salma Hayek | Won |
| 1990 | 8th TVyNovelas Awards | Best Telenovela of the Year | Lucy Orozco | Won |
| 1990 | 8th TVyNovelas Awards | Best Experienced Actress | Patricia Reyes Spíndola | Won |
| 1990 | 8th TVyNovelas Awards | Best Young Lead Actress | Patricia Pereyra | Nominated |
| 1990 | 8th TVyNovelas Awards | Best Young Lead Actor | Miguel Pizarro | Nominated |
| 1990 | 8th TVyNovelas Awards | Best Child Performance | Oscar Vallejo | Nominated |
| 1990 | 8th TVyNovelas Awards | Best Female Revelation | Salma Hayek | Won |
| 1990 | 8th TVyNovelas Awards | Best Male Revelation | Rafael Rojas | Nominated |
