= Mimí Bechelani =

Mexican actress, writer and screenwriter

- Born: September 5, 1917; Mexico City, Mexico
- Died: November 8, 1992 (age 75); Mexico City, Mexico
- Known for: Writing radio and television novelas, such as Teresa
- Notable work: Teresa
- Spouse: Mario Hernández

Mimí Bechelani was a Mexican actress, writer, and screenwriter. She had spent her entire career writing for Televisa. Bechelani was also a radio announcer, as well as a writer of poetry, novels, dramas, films, and theater scripts, for radio, TV, theatre and film industry.

== Biography and life ==
Mimí Bechelani de la Peña was born in Mexico City, Mexico, on September 5, 1917. Since she was a little girl, she had a big imagination, was an avid reader, and started to write when she was in elementary school. As a child, her father died, but she received a good education. Bechelani studied painting, English, French, history, and theater. She accompanied Amparo Villegas to New York to dub English films in Spanish, after being discovered by Luis de Llano Palmer and being hired by Metro-Goldwyn-Mayer in the 1940s. There, she also worked as a theater actress. In 1952, she worked at Radio Femenina. She also worked at the successful radio station XEW, as a writer and radio announcer. To survive, Bechelani worked as a high school teacher. She married a doctor, Mario Hernández, but they had no children. Their marriage lasted until he died.

Bechelani has written extensively, creating more than 200 works for radio and television. She is best known for being the author of the 1959 telenovela, Teresa. It was made into a film in 1961 (starring Maricruz Olivier) and was remade into four telenovelas, three with that title.

Mimí Bechelani died on November 8, 1992.

== Selected television works ==
=== Original stories ===
- (1958) Más allá de la angustia
- (1959) Teresa
- (1960) Claudia
- (1962) El profesor Valdez
- (1963) Madres egoístas
- (1964) Historia de un cobarde
- (1965) Las abuelas
- (1967) Amor sublime
- (1967) El cuarto mandamiento
- (1967) Las víctimas
- (1968) Pueblo sin esperanza
- (1969) El ciego
- (1969) Lo que no fue
- (1970) Aventura
- (1974) El chofer
- (1979) Añoranza
- (1989) Teresa
- (1992) Madres Egoístas
- (2010) Teresa

=== Adaptations ===
- Mi rival (1973) (original by Inés Rodena)
- Los que ayudan a Dios (1973) (original by Nené Cascallar)
- Mi primer amor (1973) (original by Walter Negrão)

=== Remakes written herself ===
- El honorable Señor Valdez (1973) (remake of El profesor Valdez)
- El cuarto mandamiento (1967) (remake of Teresa)

=== Remakes written by others ===
- Teresa (2010) (remake of Teresa) by Ximena Suárez
- Madres egoístas (1991) (remake of Madres egoístas) by Josefina Palos y Romo
- Teresa (1989) (remake of Teresa) by Silvia Castillejos and Francisco Sánchez
- Teresa (1969) (Brazilian remake of Teresa) by Raimundo Lopez.

== Poetry ==
- (1970) Fuego al sol; poemas eróticos
