= El cuarto mandamiento =

El cuarto mandamiento may refer to:

- El cuarto mandamiento (TV series), a Mexican telenovela
- El cuarto mandamiento (film), a 1948 Mexican drama film
