= Un solo corazón =

Mexican telenovela

- Genre: Telenovela; Drama
- Created by: Tezzie Picaso
- Written by: Luis Moreno
- Directed by: Tony Carbajal; Miguel Córcega
- Starring: Julieta Rosen; Daniel Martin; Beatriz Sheridan; Germán Robles; Raymundo Capetillo; Liliana Abud; Yamil Atala
- Country of origin: Mexico
- Original language: Spanish

Production
- Executive producer: Patricia Lozano
- Cinematography: Juan Osorio
- Production company: Televisa

Original release
- Network: Canal de las Estrellas
- Release: 1983

Un solo corazón (English title: A single heart) is a Mexican telenovela produced by Patricia Lozano and directed by Tony Carbajal for Televisa in 1983. It starred Julieta Rosen, Daniel Martin, Beatriz Sheridan, Raymundo Capetillo, and Liliana Abud.

== Cast ==
- Julieta Rosen as Julieta
- Daniel Martin as Tomas
- Beatriz Sheridan as Pilar
- Germán Robles as Juez
- Raymundo Capetillo as Roberto
- Liliana Abud as Maria
- Yamil Atala as Carlos
- Lilia Aragón as Graciela
- Miguel Córcega as Alfonso
- Lili Inclán as Grandmother
- Patricia Davalos as Mariana
- Carmen Delgado as Catalina
- Sergio Acosta as Salvador
- José Roberto as Mauricio
- Francoise Gilbert as Ingrid
- Luz María Peña as Ada
- Otto Sirgo as Oscar Padilla
- Lucía Guilmáin as Amelia
- Guillermo Zarur as Raul
- Lourdes Munguía as Helena
- Cynthia Riveroll as Alicia
- Erik Estrada as Luis
