= Teresa (2010 TV series) =

Mexican telenovela

- Genre: Telenovela
- Created by: Ximena Suárez
- Based on: Teresa (1959) by Mimí Bechelani
- Developed by: Ximena Suárez
- Written by: Julián Aguilar
- Screenplay by: Vanesa Varela
- Story by: Mimí Bechelani
- Directed by: Alejandro Gamboa; Mónica Miguel
- Starring: Sebastián Rulli; Aarón Díaz; Cynthia Klitbo; Angelique Boyer
- Theme music composer: Marcela de la Garza; Baltazar Hinajosa; Gloria Trevi
- Opening theme: "Esa hembra es mala" performed by Gloria Trevi
- Country of origin: Mexico
- Original language: Spanish
- No. of episodes: 152

Production
- Executive producer: José Alberto Castro
- Producers: Ernesto Hernández; Fausto Sáinz
- Production locations: Van Dick 73, Nonoalco, Benito Juárez, Mexico City
- Cinematography: Luis Monroy; Óscar Morales
- Editors: Héctor Flores; Juan Ordóñez

Original release
- Network: Canal de las Estrellas
- Release: August 2, 2010 – February 27, 2011

Related
- Teresa (1959); Teresa (1989)

Teresa is a Mexican telenovela produced by José Alberto Castro for Televisa. It is a remake of the Mexican telenovela of the same name produced in 1959 and in 1989 with the same name as well.

The series stars Sebastián Rulli, Aarón Díaz and Cynthia Klitbo, along with Angelique Boyer as the titular character.

== Plot ==
Teresa Chávez Aguirre (Angelique Boyer) is a beautiful and intelligent young woman who is led by her ambition. Having been born in an impoverished neighborhood Teresa’s opportunities are limited in life. Despite having the support and love from her parents to improve her economic standing in society, Teresa grows resentful and envious of the elites who she’s gotten to know while going to a private high school on a scholarship.

Dazzled by his wealth and interest in her, Teresa dates Paulo (Alejandro Nones) in high school but the relationship abruptly terminates after he discovers she is poor. Paulo and Aida (Margarita Magaña), a jealous classmate, publicly humiliate Teresa at a social gathering exposing her impoverished background and her concealment of it. The event prompts her to vow to take revenge on them, swearing she will never be trampled that same way again. “Entre ser y no ser, yo soy (Between being or not being, I am)” becomes Teresa’s motto which she ascribes to time and time again.

Teresa is able to attend a prestigious university to study law, that doesn’t offer merit based scholarships, with the help of Professor and Lawyer Arturo de la Barrera (Sebastián Rulli). Based on her performance as the highest ranked student in her high school, Arturo de la Barrera offers to pay her tuition and to be her mentor through an internship in his law firm.

When her shy millionaire friend, Aurora (Ana Brenda Contreras), expresses interest in Teresa’s first boyfriend Mariano (Aarón Díaz) who lives in the same neighborhood as her, Teresa resumes their romantic relationship from years ago. She encourages Mariano to also resume studying for medical school which he had ceased to do when his mother became ill and died.

Despite being in a committed relationship with Mariano for many years, they had hoped to get married after they both finished their studies, their different worldviews causes a schism in their relationship. Mariano believes hard work alone is enough for both of them to leave poverty behind while Teresa doesn’t believe the same and chafes under the patronizing attitude Mariano often adopts with her.

After an altercation with Mariano, which her mother witnesses and punishes by slapping her, she seeks refuge in the home (and workplace) of her former professor Arturo de la Barrera. As a clever woman, Teresa is aware of the interest her mentor has in her romantically and resides in his home due to her close relationship with both him and his sister Luisa (Fernanda Castillo).

Teresa celebrates the accomplishment of getting her law degree along with her wedding to Arturo de la Barrera in a lavish ceremony. Despite still being in love with Mariano, Teresa chooses the relationship she believes will secure her future alongside a man she admires yet does not love.

She fosters a good relationship with womanizer Fernando (Daniel Arenas), the friend of Arturo and boyfriend of Luisa. As a multimillionaire that comes from European nobility Teresa welcomes the attention and care he directs her way that stems from his attraction to her.

== Cast ==
=== Main ===
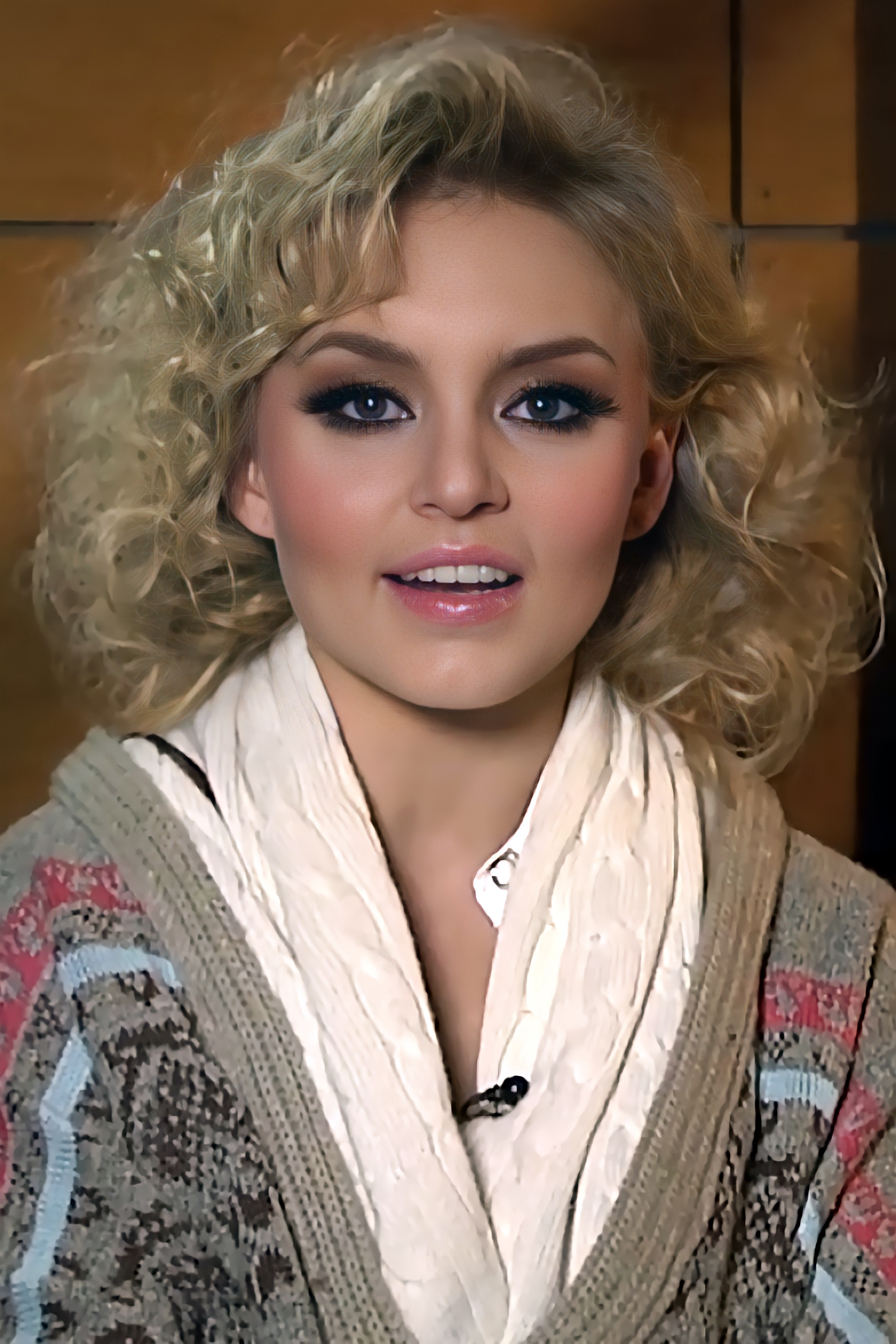
Angelique Boyer
(Teresa)

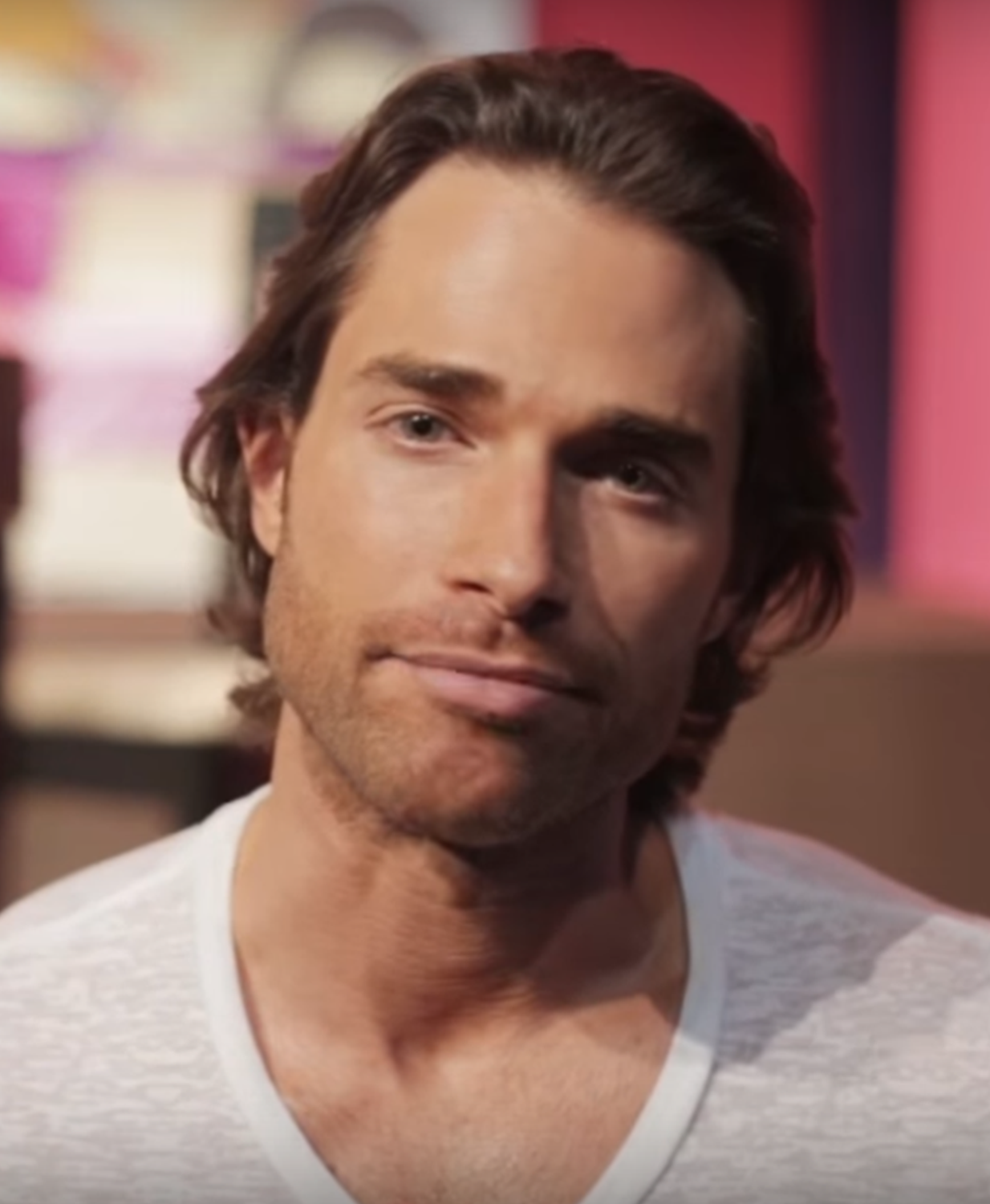
Sebastián Rulli
(Arturo)

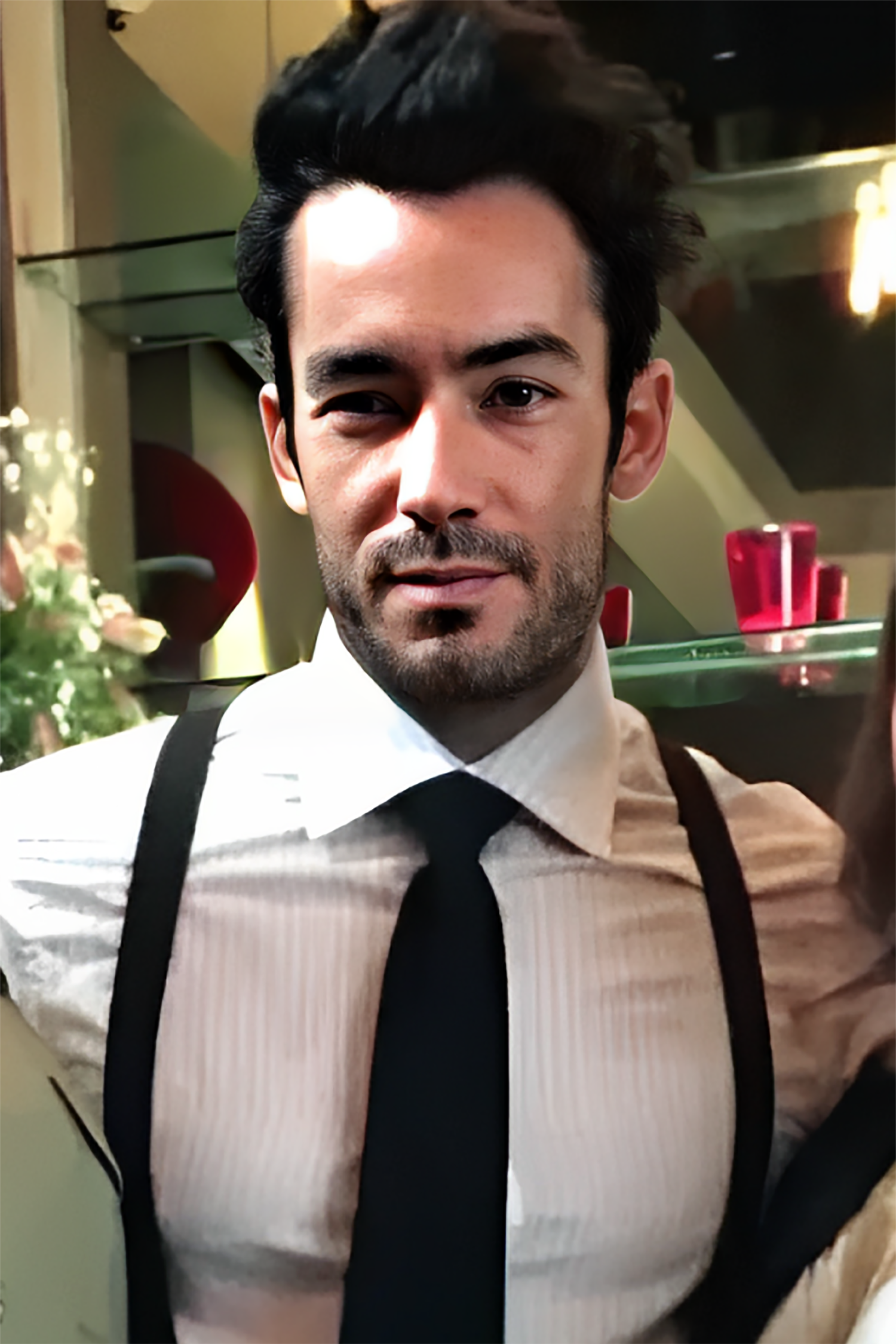
Aarón Díaz
(Mariano)

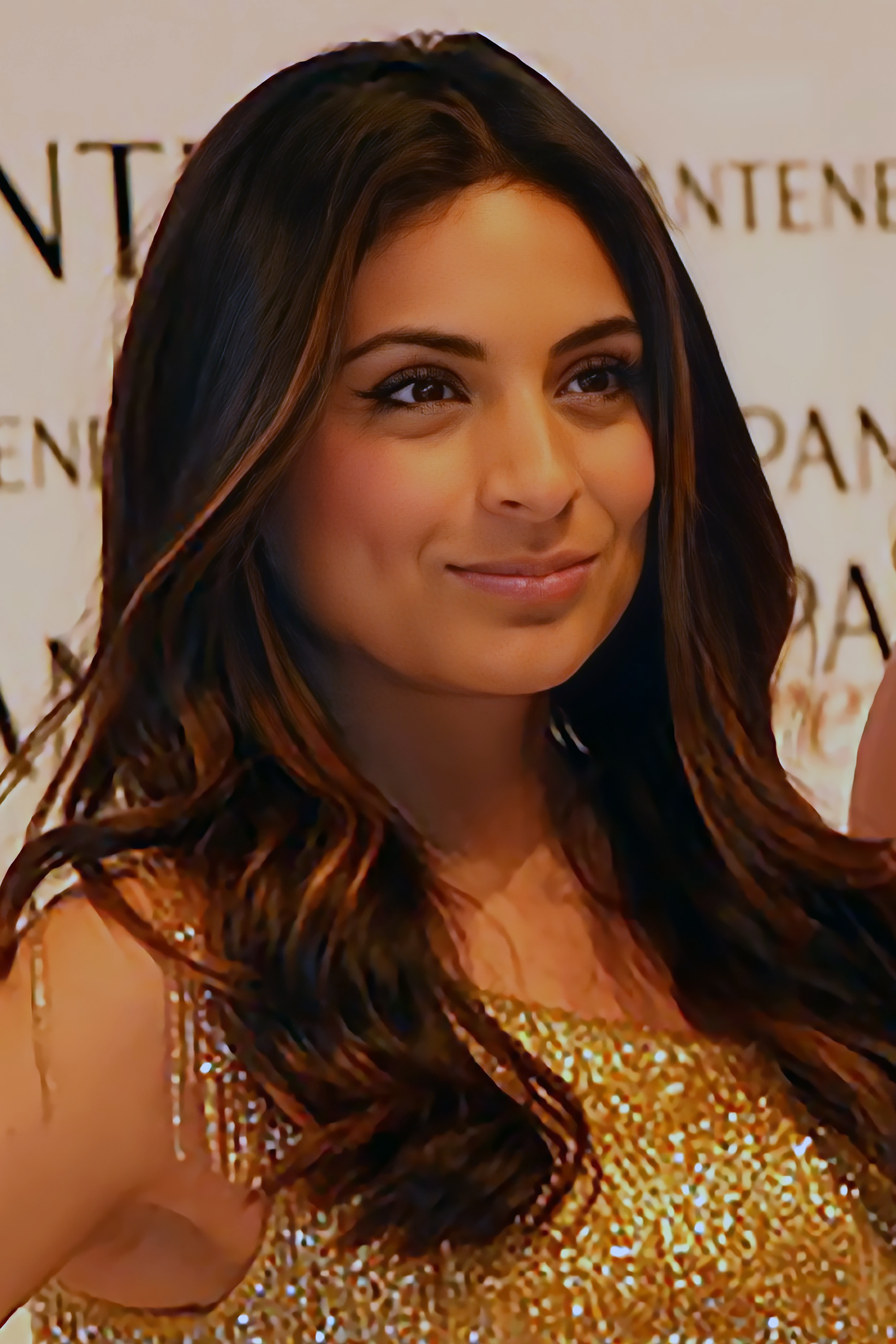
Ana Brenda Contreras
(Aurora)

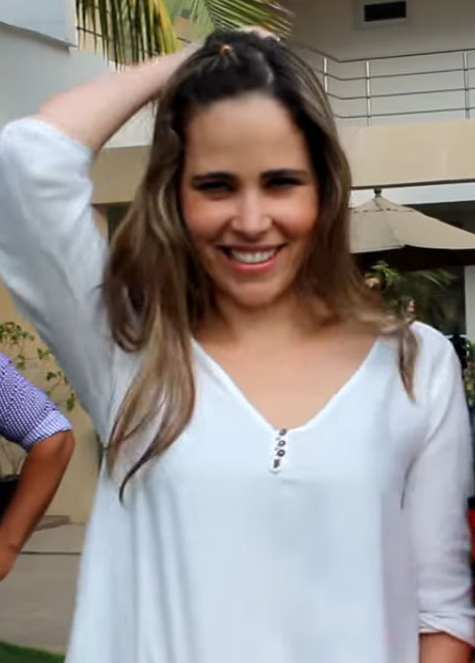
Margarita Magaña
(Aída)

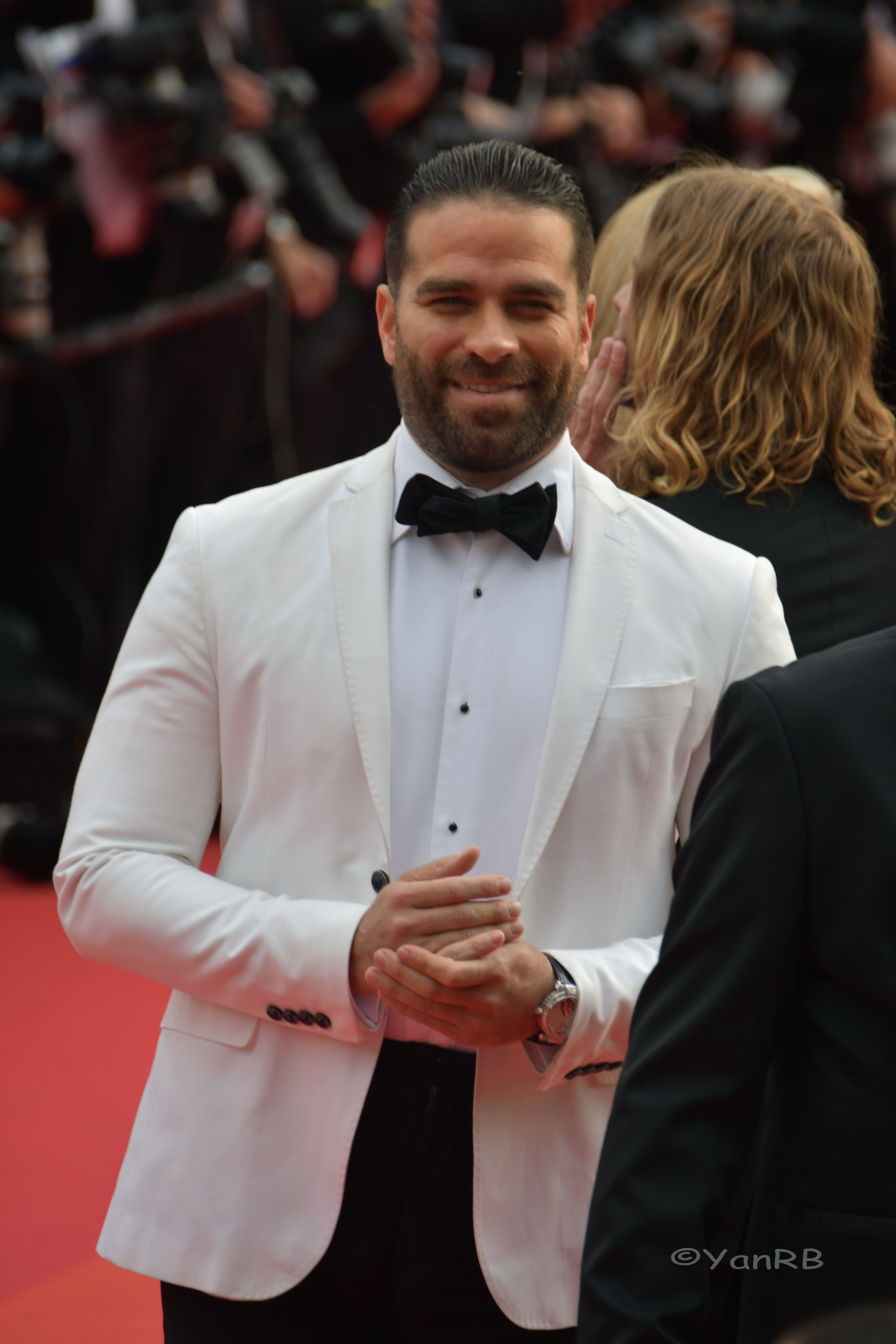
Alejandro Nones
(Paulo)

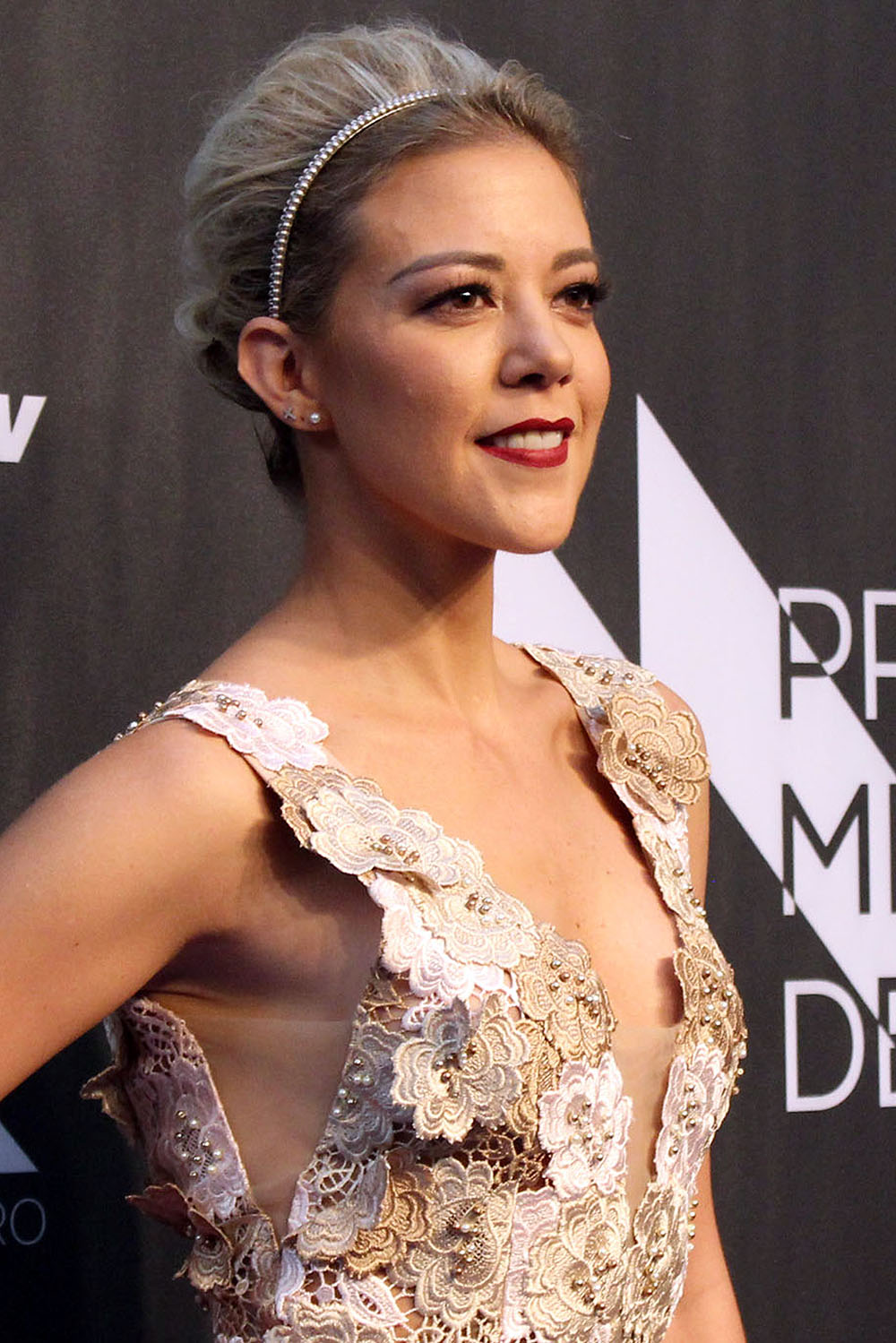
Fernanda Castillo
(Luisa)

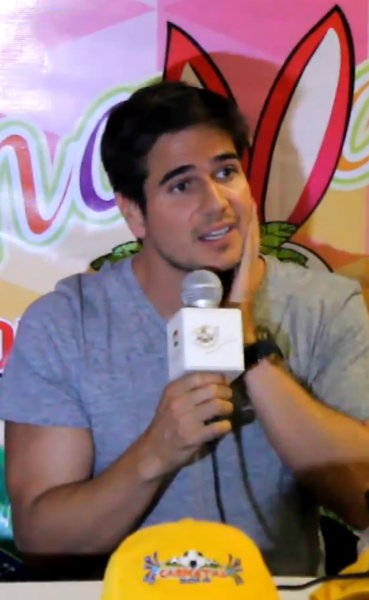
Daniel Arenas
(Fernando)

- Sebastián Rulli as Arturo de la Barrera Azuela
- Aarón Díaz as Mariano Sánchez Suárez
- Cynthia Klitbo as Juana Godoy
- Angelique Boyer as Teresa Chávez Aguirre

=== Recurring and guest stars ===
- Silvia Mariscal as Refugio Aguirre de Chávez
- Manuel Landeta as Rubén Cáceres Muro
- Ana Brenda Contreras as Aurora Alcázar Coronel
- Margarita Magaña as Aída Cáceres
- Fernanda Castillo as Luisa de la Barrera Azuela
- Felicia Mercado as Genoveva de Alba Viuda de Castellanos
- Juan Carlos Colombo as Armando Chávez
- Alejandro Ávila as Cutberto González
- Óscar Bonfiglio as Héctor Alcázar
- Fabiola Campomanes as Esperanza Medina
- Dobrina Cristeva as Mayra de Cáceres
- Toño Mauri as Hernán Ledezma
- Luis Fernando Peña as Juan Antonio "Johnny" Gómez Domínguez
- Issabela Camil as Paloma Dueñas
- Alejandro Nones as Paulo Castellanos de Alba
- Joana Brito as Ignacia "Nachita" de Medina
- Willebaldo López as Pedro Medina
- Juan Sahagún as Ramón Sánchez
- Gloria Aura as Patricia "Paty" Nájera Valverde (Note: Crediting from episode 47.)
- Daniel Arenas as Fernando Moreno Guijarro
- Mar Contreras as Lucía Álvarez Granados (Note: Mar Contreras is credited from episode 134.)
- Toño Infante as Fausto (Note: Toño Infante is credited from episode 134 to 137.)
- Raquel Olmedo as Oriana Guijarro Viuda de Moreno (Note: Raquel Olmedo is credited from episode 101.)
- Guillermo Zarur as Porfirio Valverde
- Eugenia Cauduro as Vanessa Coronel (Note: Eugenia Cauduro is credited from episode 101 to 119.)
- Patricio Borghetti as Martín Robles Ayala

== Awards and nominations ==
Year	Award	Category	Nominee(s)	Result
2010	TV Adicto Golden Awards	Best Song	"Esa hembra es mala" by Gloria Trevi	Won
2010	TV Adicto Golden Awards	Female Revelation	Angelique Boyer	Won
2010	TV Adicto Golden Awards	Special Award for Outstanding Performance by an Actor	Luis Fernando Peña	Won
2010	TV Adicto Golden Awards	Special Award for Telenovela That Improved Along the Way	Teresa	Won
2011	TV Adicto Golden Awards	Best Ending	Teresa	Won
2011	TVyNovelas Awards	Best Telenovela	José Alberto Castro	Nominated
2011	TVyNovelas Awards	Best Actress	Angelique Boyer	Won
2011	TVyNovelas Awards	Best Actor	Sebastián Rulli	Nominated
2011	TVyNovelas Awards	Best Antagonist Actress	Margarita Magaña	Nominated
2011	TVyNovelas Awards	Best Antagonist Actor	Manuel Landeta	Nominated
2011	TVyNovelas Awards	Best Co-lead Actress	Ana Brenda Contreras	Nominated
2011	TVyNovelas Awards	Best Musical Theme	"Esa hembra es mala" by Gloria Trevi	Nominated
2011	Bravo Awards	Best Actress	Angelique Boyer	Won
2011	Bravo Awards	Best Actor	Sebastián Rulli	Won
2011	People en Español Awards	Best Telenovela	Teresa	Nominated
2011	People en Español Awards	Best Actress	Angelique Boyer	Nominated
2011	People en Español Awards	Best Actor	Aarón Díaz	Nominated
2011	People en Español Awards	Best Actor	Sebastián Rulli	Nominated
2011	People en Español Awards	Revelation of the Year	Alejandro Nones	Nominated
2011	People en Español Awards	Couple of the Year	Angelique Boyer; Aarón Díaz	Nominated
2011	People en Español Awards	Couple of the Year	Angelique Boyer; Sebastián Rulli	Nominated
2011	Kids' Choice Awards Mexico	Favorite Female Character in a Series	Teresa (Angelique Boyer)	Nominated
2011	Kids' Choice Awards Mexico	Favorite Male Character in a Series	Mariano (Aarón Díaz)	Nominated
2011	Kids' Choice Awards Mexico	Favorite Villain	Teresa (Angelique Boyer)	Nominated
2011	Kids' Choice Awards Mexico	Favorite Phrase	"You scare me, Teresa!" [Refugio (Silvia Mariscal)]	Won
2012	Latin ACE Awards	Best Actress	Angelique Boyer	Won
2012	Latin ACE Awards	Best Actor	Sebastián Rulli	Won
2012	Latin ACE Awards	Best Direction	Mónica Miguel	Won
2012	Juventud Awards	Best Telenovela Theme	"Esa hembra es mala" by Gloria Trevi	Nominated

== Broadcast ==
The series originally aired from August 2, 2010 to February 27, 2011 in Mexico on Canal de las Estrellas. The series aired in United States on Univision from March 30, 2011 until October 3, 2011.

=== Ratings ===
Timeslot (ET/PT)	No. of episodes	Premiered		Ended	
Timeslot (ET/PT)	No. of episodes	Date	Premiere Ratings	Date	Finale Ratings
Monday to Friday 6:00PM	151	August 2, 2010	—N/a	February 27, 2011	33.0

=== International broadcast ===
- In Indonesia, the series was broadcast in Vision 2 Drama around 2011, and was dubbed in Bahasa Indonesia.
