= Amas de casa desesperadas (American TV series) =

American comedy-drama TV series

- Created by: Marc Cherry
- Starring: Scarlet Ortiz; Lorna Paz; Ana Serradilla; Julieta Rosen; Gabriela Vergara; Bernie Paz; Diego Bertie; Riccardo Dalmacci; Diego Ramos; Betiana Blum
- Narrated by: Lucía Méndez
- Theme music composer: Alberto Slezynger; Vinicio Ludovic
- Country of origin: United States
- Original language: Spanish
- No. of seasons: 1
- No. of episodes: 24

Production
- Running time: 60 minutes
- Production companies: Pol-Ka Producciones; Cherry Productions; ABC Studios

Original release
- Network: Univision
- Release: January 10 – June 19, 2008

Amas de Casa Desesperadas is an American dramedy television series that aired on Univision from January 10, 2008, to June 19, 2008. It is a Spanish-language adaptation of Desperate Housewives, created by Marc Cherry.

Set in the fictional Manzanares Street, the series follows the lives of four housewives and the domestic problems and daily mysteries surrounding their husbands, friends and neighbors, which can be more sinister than they appear. The series' tone combines elements of drama, comedy, mystery, farce, soap opera and satire.

== Plot ==
The show opens with the mysterious suicide of housewife Alicia Arizmendi on a beautiful day in the suburbs, on a street called Manzanares. Alicia, who narrates the show from the afterlife, had four friends: Regina Sotomayor, the seemingly-perfect mother of two teenagers struggling to save her marriage; Leonor Guerrero, the mother of four whose husband is always away on business; Susana Martinez, the divorced mother in search of love, who finds it in the form of her new neighbour Miguel Santini, who has a secret of his own; and Gabriela Solís, the materialistic ex-runway model who cheats on her husband. While trying to be good wives and mothers, the four friends also try to find out why their friend committed suicide. The discovery of a blackmail note among Alicia's belongings, a therapy session tape in which she admits her real name was Angela, and her widowed husband's strange behaviour really make them wonder about the mystery surrounding their deceased friend.

== Cast ==
This is a list of the major characters of the series, as well as their counterpart in the original, English-language, series and the actors portraying them.

- Scarlet Ortiz as Susana Martinez (Susan Mayer)
- Lorna Paz as Leonor Guerrero (Lynette Scavo)
- Julieta Rosen as Regina Sotomayor (Bree Van de Kamp)
- Ana Serradilla as Gabriela Solis (Gabrielle Solis)
- Gabriela Vergara as Roxana Guzman (Edie Britt)
- Bernie Paz as Carlos Solis
- Lucía Méndez as Alicia Arizmendi (Mary Alice Young)
- Diego Bertie as Antonio Guerrero (Tom Scavo)
- Riccardo Dalmacci as Roberto Sotomayor (Rex Van de Kamp)
- Diego Ramos as Miguel Santini (Mike Delfino)
- Betiana Blum as Marta López (Martha Huber)

== Production ==
On May 14, 2007, Univision signed a deal with The Walt Disney Company and ABC to produce programs for the network, including Amas de Casa Desesperadas. The show is unique for the Spanish-language import of an English drama series, when Spanish-language television is well known for its telenovelas.
