= Pueblo sin esperanza =

Mexican telenovela

- Genre: Telenovela
- Written by: Mimí Bechelani
- Country of origin: Mexico
- Original language: Spanish

Original release
- Network: Telesistema Mexicano
- Release: 1968

Pueblo sin esperanza (English: Hopeless town), is a Mexican telenovela produced by Televisa and originally transmitted by Telesistema Mexicano.

== Cast ==
- Jorge Ortiz de Pinedo
- Luis Aragón
- Beatriz Baz
- Carlos Becerril
- Eric del Castillo
