= Cruz de amor =

Mexican telenovela

- Genre: Telenovela
- Written by: Manuel Canseco Noriega
- Directed by: Antulio Jiménez Pons
- Country of origin: Mexico
- Original language: Spanish

Original release
- Network: Telesistema Mexicano
- Release: 1968

Cruz de amor, is a Mexican telenovela produced by Televisa and originally transmitted by Telesistema Mexicano.

== Cast ==
- Silvia Derbez as Cruz Aguirre
- Jorge Lavat as Marcos de los Monteros
- Lupita Lara as Marisol Aguirre / Claudia
- María Teresa Rivas as Doña Delfina de los Monteros
- Alicia Rodríguez as Inés de los Monteros
- José Roberto Hill as Ismael Aguirre
- Daniel "El Chino" Herrera as Tito
- Andrea López as Doña Antonia Lorenzo
- Olivia Michel
- Armando Arriola
- Tara Parra as Maura "La Mina"
- Arcadio Gamboa
- Roberto González
- Jorge Castillo
