= Van Dick 73 =

- La vecindad de Teresa
- Location within Mexico

General information
- Location: Van Dick 73, Nonoalco, Benito Juárez, Ciudad de México, DF, Mexico, Mexico
- Coordinates: 19°22′44″N 99°11′26″W
- Elevation: 7,466 ft (2,276 m)
- Construction started: around 1940

Technical details
- Floor count: 2
- Floor area: 14,504 sq ft (1,347.5 m^{2})

Van Dick 73, also known as La vecindad de Teresa, is the street address of the famous low-income apartment complex (vecindad) used in the 2010 telenovela Teresa starring Angelique Boyer.

The vecindad was used as the home setting for Teresa, Mariano, Esperanza, Juana, and Cutberto and their families. It is located in the Benito Juárez delegación in Mexico City.

The building boasts a simple architecture in the traditional Nonoalco colonia. The vecindad is painted a light lavender on the top, with a crimson on the lower bottom. The interior scenes were probably shot in a sound stage, with the exterior shots filmed on the center patio.

The vecindad is said to be 70 years old, making its construction date somewhere near 1940. Sunken windows and cracked paint, as well as exposed areas of the brick are evidence of the building's aging and apparent need for reconstruction. The vecindad has attracted many people who watch Teresa, and the street names "Van Dick" and "Leonardo Da Vinci" of the location's intersection appear in the telenovela.

The vecindad is in an apparent state of deterioration, it has been claimed that it will be demolished in a few months.
