= El ciego =

Mexican telenovela

- Genre: Telenovela
- Written by: Mimí Bechelani
- Country of origin: Mexico
- Original language: Spanish

Original release
- Network: Telesistema Mexicano

El ciego, is a Mexican telenovela produced by Televisa and originally transmitted by Telesistema Mexicano.

== Cast ==
- Julio Alemán as El Ciego
- Belem Diaz
- Rafael Cabrera
- Fina Alvaner
