= Mi vida eres tú =

- Genre: Telenovela; Romance; Drama
- Created by: Verónica Suárez
- Directed by: Tito Rojas; Yaki Ortega
- Starring: Scarlet Ortiz; Jorge Aravena; Roberto Palazuelos; Paola Toyos; Julieta Rosen; Sebastian Ligarde
- Opening theme: "Mi vida eres tú" by Rogelio Martinez
- Countries of origin: Venezuela; United States
- Original language: Spanish
- No. of episodes: 116

Production
- Executive producer: Dulce Terán
- Production locations: Miami, Florida; Venevisión Studios (filming)
- Running time: 41-44 minutes
- Production company: Venevisión

Original release
- Network: Venevisión; Univision
- Release: July 10 – December 8, 2006

Related
- Olvidarte Jamás; Acorralada

Mi vida eres tú (English title: You are my life) is a 2006 telenovela developed by Verónica Suárez and produced by Cisneros Media Distribution in Miami, Florida.

Scarlet Ortiz and Jorge Aravena starred as the main protagonists, while Paola Toyos, Roberto Palazuelos, and Fernando Carrera starred as antagonists.

It aired on June 9, 2008 until October 23, 2008 on Venezuela via Venevisión Plus at the 10 pm timeslot and reairing at the 1pm timselot.

== Plot ==
Daniela and Gabriel meet by accident and sparks fly between them in spite of the fact that they are both already romantically involved. Daniela has been going out with Ricardo for years, but he is still not willing to commit to marriage, and is consistently unfaithful and while Gabriel is engaged to Raquel, what he feels for her is not really love, but lust. He has stayed in the relationship under pressure from his godmother Angela who, for selfish reasons that will be revealed later on, insists on having him to marry Raquel.

Although Gabriel inherited an enormous fortune after the death of his parents, he cares very little about money and social class, instead devoting his time to his greatest passion, radio. Interested in Daniela, he conceals his wealth and moves to the middle-class neighborhood where she lives.

== Cast ==
- Scarlet Ortiz as Daniela Álvarez de Alcázar / Bárbara Rodena de Borgia
- Jorge Aravena as Gabriel Alcázar
- Roberto Palazuelos as Aristeo Borgia Rodena
- Paola Toyos as Raquel Aristizábal Ozora
- Julieta Rosen as Ángela Borgia
- Sebastian Ligarde as Alan Robinson / George Smith
- Hector Soberon as Lucho
- Mauricio Aspe as Ricardo
- Jorge Luis Pila as Carlos "Charlie" Rosendo
- Fernando Carrera as Manuel Borgia
- Franklin Virguez as Jorge Flores
- Tatiana Capote as Susana Alvarez
- Leonardo Daniel as Andrés Borgia / Mario Álvarez
- Alicia Plaza as Adela Ozora Vda. de Aristizábal
- Maritza Bustamante as Beatriz "Betty" Esparza
- Andres Garcia as Lorenzo
- Carmen Daysi Rodriquez as Renee
- William Levy as Federico
- Alejandra Graña as Rosalinda
- Adrian Mas as Enrique Alvarez
- Carla Rodriguez as Rita
- Marianne Lovera as Deby de la Fuente
- Jolly Dominguez as Amparo
- Julio Capote as Lucas Malpica
