= Comanche (1956 film) =

1956 film by George Sherman

- Theatrical release poster
- Directed by: George Sherman
- Screenplay by: Carl Krueger
- Produced by: Carl Kreuger
- Starring: Dana Andrews; Kent Smith; Linda Cristal; Nestor Paiva; Henry Brandon
- Cinematography: Jorge Stahl Jr.
- Edited by: Charles L. Kimball
- Music by: Herschel Burke Gilbert
- Color process: DeLuxe Color
- Production company: Carl Krueger Productions
- Distributed by: United Artists
- Release date: March 1956
- Running time: 87 minutes
- Country: United States
- Language: English
- Box office: $1.15 million dollars (US)

Comanche is a 1956 American Western film directed by George Sherman in CinemaScope and starring Dana Andrews. The film has a theme song "A Man Is As Good As His Word" sung by The Lancers.

== Plot ==
In 1875, near Durango, Mexico, a group of renegade Comanche attack a peaceful village and kidnap the daughter of a Spanish aristocrat as well as others. They escape the Mexican Army by crossing into US territory, taking their captives with them.

Jim Read, a frontier scout, is sent to investigate and ease tensions between the Mexicans and the Comanche. However, longstanding hatred and the profitable business of scalp-hunting does not help in resolving the conflict. The Mexican government has agreed to stop paying for Comanche scalps, but the "white eyes" (Americans) are ignoring the agreement.

Read is sent to negotiate with the Comanche chief, Quanah. Whilst searching for Quanah, Read sees Art Downey, an alleged buffalo hunter who is in fact a scalp-hunter, shoot and wound a Comanche warrior. When Downey and his companion dismount to finish him off and take his scalp, Read and his companion, Puffer, rescue him and promises to take him to Chief Quanah. He also rescues Margarita, the Mexican aristo woman taken captive in the Comanche raid who had escaped from the raiding party led by the chief. Read, however, is himself accused of shooting the brave by Black Cloud, a dissident sub-chief, until the wounded brave, Quanah's brother, recovers enough to tell the great chief Read and Puffer had driven off the scalp-hunters and saved his life.

Read reveals to Quanah that they are cousins; that his mother was the sister of Quanah's mother. Quanah swears friendship to Read and agrees to talk to the representative of President Grant sent to make peace with the Comanche. Black Cloud disagrees with Quanah in council, calling for a war with the whites. The great chief exiles Black Cloud and his followers from the tribe.

Read and Puffer leave to fetch the government officials to a peace council, but discovers a cavalry detachment that has been massacred by Black Cloud and his braves. The Government official, Commissioner Ward (Lowell Gilmore), has ordered the cavalry to subdue the Indians, by force if necessary. Black Cloud attacks the column of cavalry troopers with whom Ward is riding and captures the commissioner. Read leads a second column, commanded by the general leading the cavalry brigade, in pursuit of the renegades.

Black Cloud leads his braves and the pursuing cavalry into a canyon where he has arranged an ambush, only to discover Quanah and a large force of Antelope tribe Comanches cutting his line of retreat. Chief Quanah refuses to interfere. The vengeful Black Cloud kills Commissioner Ward when the cavalry general refuses to let Black Cloud's Comanches out of the canyon. In the ensuing battle, Read kills Downey (who was trying to bushwhack him) and Black Cloud.

Following the battle, the great chief invites the general and Read into his camp and agrees to a treaty: to make peace with the Americans and fight them no more. The general, Read, Margarita (who has fallen in love with Read), and Puffer ride out from Quanah's camp, their mission accomplished.

== Cast ==
- Dana Andrews as Jim Read
- Kent Smith as Quanah Parker
- Nestor Paiva as Puffer
- Henry Brandon as Black Cloud
- Stacy Harris as Downey
- John Litel as Gen. Nelson A. Miles
- Lowell Gilmore as Commissioner Ward
- Mike Mazurki as Flat Mouth
- Tony Carbajal as Little Snake
- Linda Cristal as Margarita
- Reed Sherman as Lt. French
- Iron Eyes Cody as Medicine Arrow, the medicine man

== Production ==
Writer-producer Carl Krueger spent five to six years researching the story. He says he was offered up to $30,000 for the script but held out to make it independently as he wanted the film shot in Mexico.

== Reception ==
The film received some good reviews with the location work in Durango, Mexico much praised. TV Guide and the Radio Times both rated it two out of four stars, each citing it as interesting mostly for introducing Cristal to North American audiences.
