= Linda Cristal =

Argentine-American actress (1931–2020)

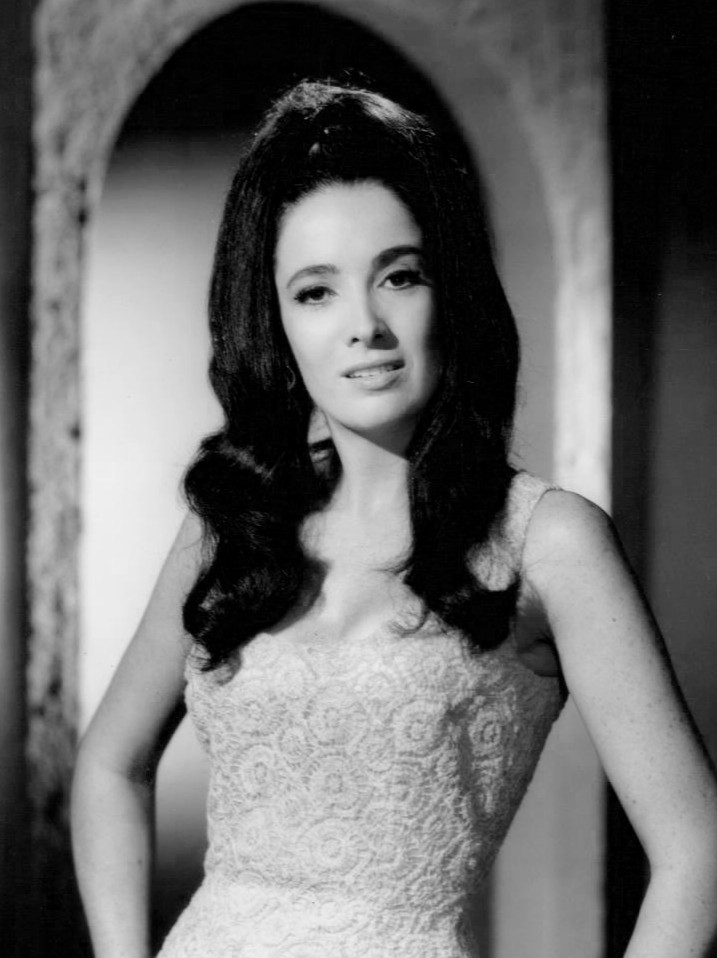
- Cristal as Victoria Cannon in The High Chaparral (1967)
- Born: Marta Victoria Moya Peggo Burges; 23 February 1931; Rosario, Santa Fe Province, Argentina
- Died: 27 June 2020 (aged 89); Beverly Hills, California, U.S.
- Occupation: Actress
- Years active: 1952–1992
- Spouses: Tito Gómez (m. 1950; ann. 1950) Robert W. Champion (m. 1958; div. 1959) Yale Wexler (m. 1960; div. 1966)
- Children: 2 sons

Marta Victoria Moya Peggo Burges (24 February 1931 – 27 June 2020), known professionally as Linda Cristal (Spanish: [kɾisˈtal]), was an Argentine-American actress. She appeared in a number of Western films during the 1950s, before winning a Golden Globe Award for her performance in the 1958 comedy film The Perfect Furlough.

From 1967 to 1971, Cristal starred as Victoria Cannon in the NBC series The High Chaparral. For her performance she won the Golden Globe Award for Best Actress – Television Series Drama in 1970, and received two Emmy Award nominations.

== Early life ==
The daughter of a French father and an Italian mother Rosario Pego, Cristal was born as Marta Victoria Moya Peggo Burges on 24 February 1931 near Buenos Aires, Argentina. Her father was a publisher who moved the family to Montevideo, Uruguay due to political issues. She was educated at the Conservatorio Franklin in Uruguay.

== Career ==
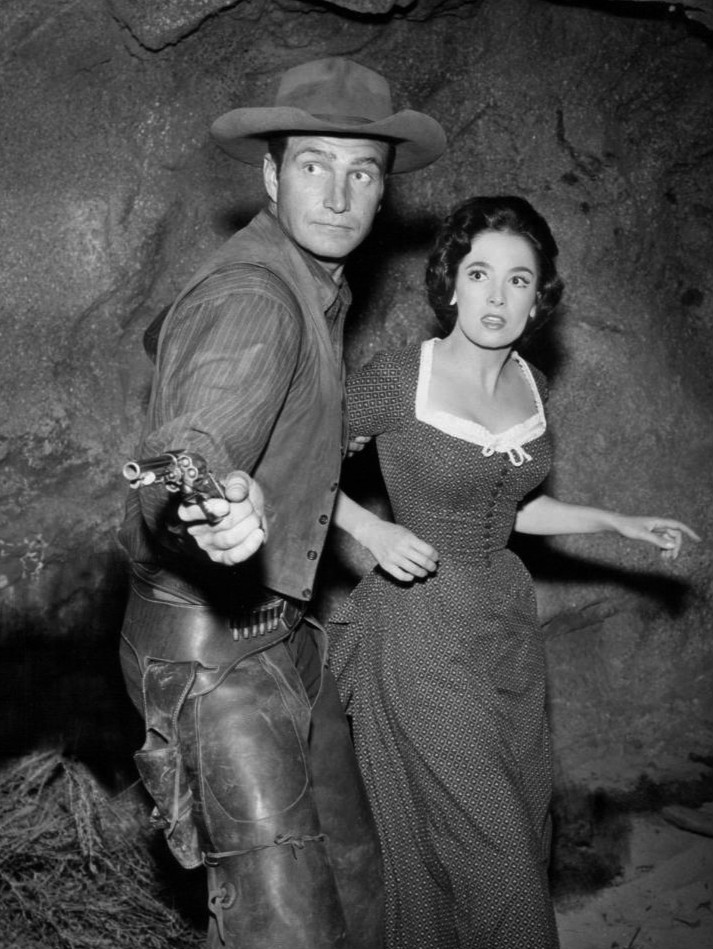
Cristal in Rawhide in 1959.

Cristal appeared in films in Argentina and Mexico before taking on her first English-language role as Margarita in the 1956 Western film Comanche.

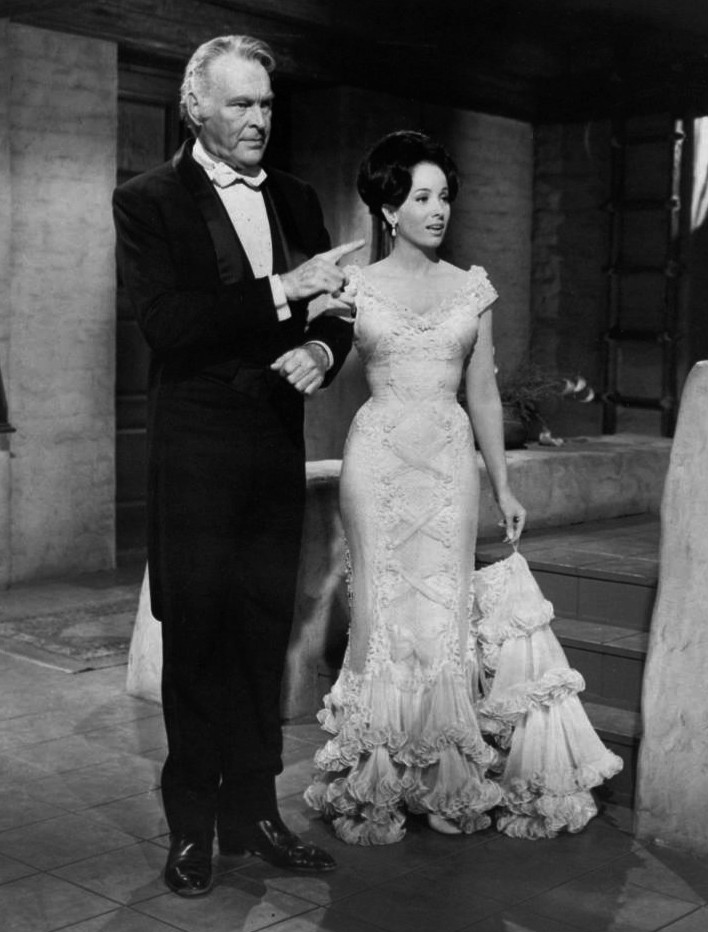
Leif Erickson and Cristal in The High Chaparral

Following her Golden Globe Award for New Star of the Year in The Perfect Furlough (1958), Cristal went on to roles in Cry Tough (1959), Legions of the Nile (1959), The Pharaohs' Woman (1960), and was asked by John Wayne to play the part of Flaca in his epic The Alamo (1960). In 1961 she had a key role in the Western Two Rode Together.

Along with these and other film roles, Cristal appeared in episodes of network television series. She played a kidnapped Countess opposite Eric Fleming and Clint Eastwood in a 1959 episode of Rawhide. She also had a role as a female matador in NBC's The Tab Hunter Show. She also appeared in a 1964 episode, "City Beneath the Sea", on Voyage to the Bottom of the Sea and numerous other television episodes.

Cristal semi-retired in 1964 to raise her two children. She was coaxed out of retirement when she became the last cast member to be added as a regular on the NBC series The High Chaparral (1967-1971). Her performance in the series, as Victoria Cannon, earned her two more Golden Globe nominations (winning Best Actress – Television Drama in 1968) and two Emmy Award nominations.

Cristal worked sparingly after The High Chaparral, with a few television and film roles, such as the film Mr. Majestyk (1974) and the television miniseries Condominium (1980). She last appeared in the starring role of Victoria "Rossé" Wilson on the Argentine television series Rossé (1985).

== Personal life ==
Cristal's 1950 marriage was annulled after five days. On 24 April 1958, in Pomona, California, she married Robert Champion, a businessman. They divorced on 9 December 1959. In 1960, she married Yale Wexler, a former actor who worked in real estate. They divorced in December 1966.

Cristal died at her home in Beverly Hills, California on 27 June 2020, aged 89.

== Filmography ==
=== Film ===
Year	Title	Role	Notes
1952	When the Fog Lifts	amiga de Silvia	Uncredited
1953	Forbidden Fruit	Julia	Uncredited
1953	The Spot of the Family	Rosita	
1953	The Magnificent Beast		Uncredited
1953	Genius and Figure	Rosita	
1954	Con el diablo en el cuerpo	Emilia	
1955	El 7 leguas	Blanca	
1955	La venganza del diablo		Uncredited
1956	Comanche	Margarita	
1956	Enemigos	Chabela	
1957	El diablo desaparece	Laura	
1958	The Last of the Fast Guns	Maria O'Reilly	
1958	The Fiend Who Walked the West	Ellen Hardy	
1958	The Perfect Furlough	Sandra Roca	
1959	Siete pecados	Irene	
1959	Cry Tough	Sarita	
1959	Legions of the Nile	Cleopatra alias Berenice	
1960	The Alamo	Flaca	
1960	The Pharaohs' Woman	Akis	
1961	Two Rode Together	Elena de la Madriaga	
1963	Slave Girls of Sheba	Olivia	
1968	Panic in the City	Dr. Paula Stevens	
1974	Mr. Majestyk	Nancy Chavez	
1977	Love and the Midnight Auto Supply	Annie	

=== Television ===
Year	Title	Role	Notes
1959	Rawhide	Louise	Episode: "Incident of a Burst of Evil"
1961	The Tab Hunter Show	Gitana	Episode: "Holiday in Spain"
1964	Voyage to the Bottom of the Sea	Melina Gounaris	Episode: "City Beneath the Sea"
1967–1971	The High Chaparral	Victoria Cannon	96 episodes
1971	Cade's County	Celsa Dobbs	Episode: "A Gun for Billy"
1974	Police Story	Estrella	Episode: "Across The Line"
1974	El chofer	Julia	telenovela
1975	The Dead Don't Die	Vera LaValle	TV movie
1979	Barnaby Jones	Patricia Simmons	Episode: "Homecoming for a Dead Man"
1980	Condominium	Carlotta Churchbridge	2 episodes
1981	The Love Boat	Evita Monteverde	Episode: "The Duel"
1985	Rossé	Victoria "Rossé" Wilson	Argentina, lead character
