= El chofer =

Mexican telenovela

- Genre: Telenovela
- Created by: Mimí Bechelani
- Directed by: Alfredo Saldaña
- Starring: Jorge Rivero; Linda Cristal
- Country of origin: Mexico
- Original language: Spanish

Production
- Executive producer: Ernesto Alonso
- Cinematography: Jorge Cobos; Ramón Gama

Original release
- Network: Canal de las Estrellas
- Release: 1974

El chofer, is a Mexican telenovela produced by Guillermo Diazayas for Televisa in 1974. Starring Jorge Rivero and Linda Cristal.

== Cast ==
- Jorge Rivero as José
- Linda Cristal as Julia
- Milton Rodríguez as Luigi
- Susana Alexander as Tania
- Susana Dosamantes as Pilar
- Carlos Piñar as Andrés
- Olga Breeskin as Nora
- Jorge Vargas as Manuel
- Anita Blanch as Carmelita
- Sonia Furió as Soledad
- Sergio Jimenez as Rogelio
- Pilar Pellicer as Silvia
- Armando Silvestre as Armando
- Socorro Avelar as Olvido
- Silvia Mariscal
- Guillermo Zarur as Lobitos
- Lourdes Canale as Lulu
- Nelly Menden
