= Lo que no fue =

- Genre: Telenovela
- Written by: Mimí Bechelani
- Country of origin: Mexico
- Original language: Spanish

Original release
- Network: Telesistema Mexicano

Lo que no fue, is a 1969 Mexican telenovela produced by Televisa and originally transmitted by Telesistema Mexicano.

== Cast ==
- María Elena Marqués
- José Galvéz
- María Teresa Rivas
- Elsa Cárdenas
