= Una noche sin mañana =

Mexican telenovela

- Genre: Telenovela
- Country of origin: Mexico
- Original language: Spanish

Original release
- Network: Telesistema Mexicano
- Release: 1961

Una noche sin mañana (English: An evening without morning) is a Mexican telenovela produced by Televisa and broadcast by Telesistema Mexicano in 1961.

== Cast ==
- Roberto Araya
- Héctor Gómez
- Héctor Godoy
- María Teresa Rivas
- Carmen Salas
- Delia Magaña
- Pilar Sen
