= Magdalena (Mexican TV series) =

- Genre: Telenovela
- Country of origin: Mexico
- Original language: Spanish

Original release
- Network: Telesistema Mexicano
- Release: 1970

Magdalena is a Mexican telenovela produced by Televisa and transmitted by Telesistema Mexicano in 1970.

== Cast ==
- Magda Guzmán
- María Teresa Rivas
- Augusto Benedico
- Claudio Obregón
