= Amor sublime =

Mexican telenovela

- Genre: Telenovela
- Written by: Mimí Bechelani
- Country of origin: Mexico
- Original language: Spanish

Original release
- Network: Telesistema Mexicano
- Release: 1967

Amor sublime, is a Mexican telenovela produced by Televisa and originally transmitted by Telesistema Mexicano.

== Cast ==
- Silvia Derbez
- Carlos Ancira
- Aurora Molina
- Maruja Grifell
- José Alonso
