= Legions of the Nile =

- Directed by: Vittorio Cottafavi
- Written by: Ennio De Concini; Vittorio Cottafavi; Giorgio Cristallini; Arnaldo Marrosu
- Produced by: Robert de Nesle; Natividad Zaro
- Starring: Linda Cristal; Ettore Manni; Georges Marchal
- Cinematography: Mario Pacheco
- Edited by: Luciano Cavalieri; Julio Peña
- Music by: Renzo Rossellini
- Production companies: Alexandra Film; Atenea Films; Estela Films; Lyre Films
- Distributed by: Comptoir Français du Film
- Release dates: 27 November 1959 (Italy); 6 June 1960 (Spain); 6 July 1960 (France)
- Running time: 100 minutes
- Countries: Italy; France; Spain
- Language: Italian

Legions of the Nile (Italian: Le legioni di Cleopatra; French: Les légions de Cléopâtre; Spanish: Las legiones de Cleopatra) is a 1959 Eastmancolor historical epic adventure film written and directed by Vittorio Cottafavi.

== Plot summary ==
A traveler from Greece to Alexandria seeks an audience with Cleopatra and employment as a gladiator at the time of the Roman conquest of Egypt.

Marcus Antonius, a renegade Roman who is in bondage to his mistress, also lives in the palace of Queen Cleopatra. Augustus wants to give him the opportunity to be reconciled with his country of origin. To this end, he instructs the warhorse Curridio to persuade Antonius to return to his homeland. When Curridio arrives in Alexandria, he poses as a Greek. As soon as he stops at the first tavern he comes across, he makes the acquaintance of the hard-drinking athlete Gotarze. The two are equally sympathetic and form friendships with each other.

Curridio acquires 12-year-old Rais and his older sister Marianne on the slave market. Although the girl is extremely attractive, her owner initially has no spare eyes for her. One night, Curridio sees the dancer Berenice, who immediately sets his heart on fire. He still has no idea that she is none other than the queen herself.

He only becomes aware of this when he has used a trick to overpower the palace guards and penetrated the sacred rooms. Because Cleopatra admires his daring, she now demands his love.

When Curridio gains access to the palace for the second time, he finds the renegade Antonius. But he rejects the offer of mediation and declares that he wants to fight Augustus. Curridio's fatality is that the conversation has been overheard. Now he is in great danger, but thanks to his friend Gotarze he is able to save himself at the last moment. However, little Rais paid for his courage with his life. Then Curridio learns how much he has been deceived by Cleopatra. Deeply hurt, he confronts her; but she has nothing but scorn for him and commands his death.

In the ensuing battle Augustus is victorious. After Cleopatra turned away from Antony, he committed suicide. The queen then drives eight horses to meet the victorious Caesar. But her art of seduction leaves him cold. Back in her palace, she too takes her own life.

Gotarze had managed to save Curridio a second time. He now bids farewell to his friends and returns to his homeland with Marianne, whom he has since learned to love.

== Cast ==
- Linda Cristal as Cleopatra aka Berenice
- Ettore Manni as Curridio
- Georges Marchal as Mark Antony
- Conrado San Martín as Gotarze (credited as Corrado Sanmartin)
- María Mahor as Marianne
- Alfredo Mayo as Gaius Octavius
- Daniela Rocca as Teyré
- Mino Doro as Domiziano
- Andrea Aureli as Imotio
- Juan Maján as Vezio
- Tomás Blanco as Ovidio
- Jany Clair as Andemio
- Ángel Álvarez as Slave merchant
