= Nosotros los pobres (TV series) =

- Genre: Telenovela
- Directed by: Enrique Segoviano
- Starring: Alberto Vázquez; Lupita Lara
- Country of origin: Mexico
- Original language: Spanish

Original release
- Network: Canal de las Estrellas
- Release: 1973

Related
- Nosotros los pobres (1948)

Nosotros los pobres, is a Mexican telenovela directed by Enrique Segoviano for Televisa in 1973. This is a remake of old Mexican movie of 1948 Nosotros los pobres with Pedro Infante.

== Cast ==
- Alberto Vázquez
- Lupita Lara
- Norma Lazareno
- Narciso Busquets
- María Teresa Rivas
- Dalilah Polanco as Chachita
- Lucha Villa
- Miguel Manzano
- Adalberto Martínez
- Sonia Amelio
- Lilia Prado
- Rosario Granados
- José Luis Jiménez
- Ernesto Gómez Cruz
- Eduardo López Rojas
- Susana Cabrera
