= Buscando el paraíso =

Mexican telenovela

- Genre: Telenovela
- Directed by: Benjamín Cann
- Starring: Pedro Fernández; Yolanda Andrade; Karla Álvarez; Alejandro Ibarra; Tiaré Scanda; Lorena Rojas; Fernando Balzaretti
- Theme music composer: Ferra - Jorge Nazar
- Opening theme: Buscando el paraíso
- Country of origin: Mexico
- Original language: Spanish
- No. of episodes: 100

Production
- Executive producers: Luis de Llano Macedo; Marco Flavio Cruz
- Production locations: Mexico City, Mexico
- Running time: 41-44 minutes
- Production company: Televisa

Original release
- Network: Canal de las Estrellas
- Release: November 8, 1993 – April 1, 1994

Buscando el paraíso (Looking for paradise) is a Mexican telenovela produced by Luis de Llano Macedo and Marco Flavio Cruz for Televisa in 1993.

Pedro Fernández and Yolanda Andrade starred as protagonists, while Karla Álvarez starred as main antagonist.

== Plot ==
Dalia and Andrea are two very different girls despite being sisters. Andrea has always been sexy heartbreaker instead his sister is shy and insecure. Dalia has a secret, is in love with Ángel a professional conqueror and former boyfriend of Andrea.

To make him jealous Andrea, Ángel begins a relationship with Dalia, but then leaves to seduce her. Actually he is obsessed with sensual Lolita, who is the father of Ángel lover. Abandoned and pregnant, Dalia refuge in the affection Julio a poor boy, but worker. Only Andrea jealousy and the return of Ángel's spread.

== Cast ==
- Pedro Fernández as Julio Flores Vallado
- Yolanda Andrade as Dalia Montero Machado
- Karla Álvarez as Andrea Montero Machado
- Alejandro Ibarra as Ángel
- Tiaré Scanda as Alma
- Lorena Rojas as Lolita
- Fernando Balzaretti as Don Luis
- Alonso Echánove as Horacio
- María Rojo as Amalia
- Amparo Arozamena as Doña Edna
- Anna Silvetti as Carmelita
- Carlos Espejel as Benjamín
- Blanca Sánchez as Gabriela
- Patricio Castillo as Don Patricio
- Otto Sirgo as Don Ángel
- José Suárez as Eduardo
- Alejandro Treviño as Erik
- Tina Romero as Elsa
- Sergio Bustamante as Marcelo
- Mauricio Armando as Diego
- Alejandra Morales as Martha
- Salvador Sánchez as Detective Berriozábal
- Geraldine Bazán as Alma (young)
- Mónika Sánchez
- Marta Aura
- Anna Ciocchetti

== Awards ==
Year	Award	Category	Nominee	Result
1994	12th TVyNovelas Awards	Best Young Lead Actor	Pedro Fernández	Nominated
1994	12th TVyNovelas Awards	Best Musical Theme	Pedro Fernández; Alejandro Ibarra	Nominated
