= The Perfect Furlough =

1958 film by Blake Edwards

- theatrical release poster
- Directed by: Blake Edwards
- Written by: Stanley Shapiro
- Produced by: Robert Arthur
- Starring: Tony Curtis; Janet Leigh; Keenan Wynn; Elaine Stritch; Les Tremayne; Marcel Dalio; Linda Cristal
- Cinematography: Philip Lathrop
- Edited by: Milton Carruth
- Music by: Frank Skinner
- Production company: Universal-International Pictures
- Distributed by: Universal-International Pictures
- Release dates: November 30, 1958 (United States); January 21, 1959 (New York City)
- Running time: 93 minutes
- Country: United States
- Language: English
- Box office: $2.3 million (est. US/ Canada rentals)

The Perfect Furlough is a 1958 American CinemaScope Eastmancolor romantic comedy film directed by Blake Edwards and written by Stanley Shapiro. Edwards and Shapiro would re-team the following year for another Tony Curtis service comedy, Operation Petticoat. Linda Cristal won the Golden Globe Award for Best New Star at the 16th Golden Globe Awards for the film.

== Plot ==
The army has a problem when over 100 male soldiers stationed at an isolated Arctic base for nearly a year start having psychological issues due to their isolation. As a result, they have lost all sense of military discipline, are careless and lackadaisical in their duties and their morale is at rock bottom. As it is impossible to give all the soldiers a furlough, their commanding general in the US holds a meeting to discuss the best solution. Army psychiatrist Lieutenant Vicky Loren suggests that the soldiers on the isolated base decide amongst themselves what would be "the perfect furlough" with a lottery being held where one lucky soldier would go on the furlough with the rest of the soldiers living vicariously through him. They decide on a trip to Paris with Argentine sex symbol movie star Sandra Roca.

The scheming Corporal Paul Hodges wins the lottery and gets to Paris on a three weeks' leave. The army is worried that Hodges' reputation as a ladies' man will embarrass the army if he has his way with Sandra. Loren and two military policemen, Sylvia and Hans, keep Hodges under constant supervision, but Hodges schemes to score with Sandra.

== Cast ==
- Tony Curtis as Cpl. Paul Hodges
- Janet Leigh as Lt. Vicki Loren
- Keenan Wynn as Harvey Franklin
- Linda Cristal as Sandra Roca
- Elaine Stritch as Liz Baker
- Marcel Dalio as Henri Valentin
- Les Tremayne as Col. Leland
- Jay Novello as Rene Valentin
- King Donovan as Maj. Collins
- Gordon Jones as MP "Sylvia"
- Alvy Moore as Pvt. Marvin Brewer
- Lilyan Chauvin as French Nurse
- Troy Donahue as Sgt. Nickles
- Dick Crockett as MP Hans
- Eugene Borden as French Doctor
- James Lanphier as Assistant Hotel Manager

== See also ==
- List of American films of 1958
