= Toño Mauri =

Mexican singer and actor

- Born: July 29, 1964 (age 60); Mexico
- Occupation: Actor
- Years active: 1982−present
- Spouse(s): Carla Alemán Magnani (1992–present)
- Children: 2

Toño Mauri (born July 29, 1964) is a Mexican singer and actor. He has performed in a number of telenovelas since 1985. In 2020 he survived a double lung transplant after contracting COVID-19.

== Selected filmography ==
Film
Year	Title	Role	Notes
1990	Trampa Infernal	Mauricio	

TV
Year	Title	Role	Notes
2018	Por amar sin ley	Dr. Ávalos	Supporting Role
2014	La Malquerida	Dr.Andres Vivanco	Supporting Role
2010-11	Teresa	Hernan Ledesma	Supporting Role
2007-08	Pasión	Alvaro Fernandez de la Cueva	Antagonist
2006	Las dos caras de Ana	Adrian Ponce	Supporting Role
2004-05	Inocente de Ti	Sebastian Rionda	Supporting Role
2003-04	Velo de novia	Juan Carlos Villasenor	Supporting Role
2002	La Otra	Daniel Mendizabal	Supporting Role
2000-01	Abrázame muy fuerte	Sacerdote Moises	Supporting Role
1998-99	El Privilegio de Amar	Alonso del Angel	Supporting Role
1996	La antorcha encendida	Andrés Quintana Roo	Supporting Role
1991	Madres egoístas	Maximiliano Báez	Supporting Role
1989-1990	Simplemente María	José Ignacio López	Supporting Role
1989	Mi segunda madre	Federico ``Sico´´	Supporting Role
1985	Juana Iris	Mauricio	Supporting Role
