= Gabriela (1960 TV series) =

1960 Mexican television series

Gabriela is a Mexican telenovela that aired on Canal 4, Telesistema Mexicano in 1960.

== Plot ==
Gabriela is a young girl, who for love cheats on her husband.

== Cast ==
- María Teresa Rivas as Gabriela
- Roberto Cañedo
- Angelines Fernández
