= Scarlet Ortiz =

Venezuelan actress

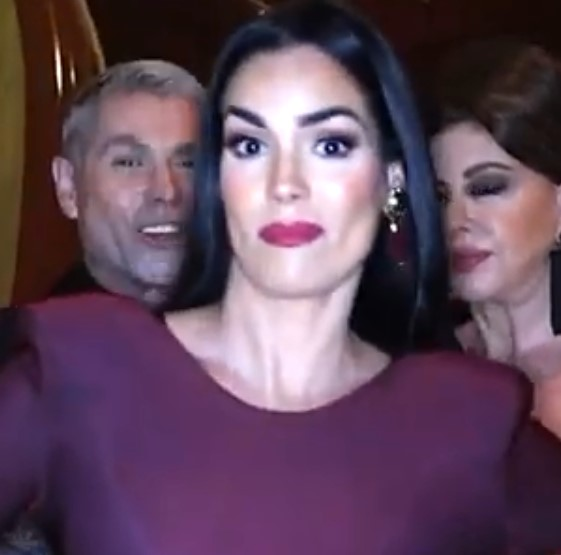
- Born: Hevis Scarlet Ortiz Pacheco; 12 March 1974 (age 52); Caracas, Venezuela
- Occupations: Actress, model
- Years active: 1992–present
- Spouse: Yul Bürkle
- Children: Barbara Brianna Bürkle

Scarlet Ortiz (born Hevis Scarlet Ortiz Pacheco) March 12, 1974 is a Venezuelan actress and beauty pageant titleholder. She is known for her role in telenovelas.

== Biography ==
Scarlet started her acting career in a children's show called Nubeluz in Venezuela. She also participated in Miss Venezuela 1992 as Miss Sucre.

In July 2009 the Spanish language edition of People Magazine reported that she was pregnant from her boyfriend Yul Bürkle and on March 9, 2010, she gave birth to a baby girl in Mount Sinai Hospital in Miami and named her Barbara Briana. Her chosen godparents will be the actress Gaby Espino and the telenovela writer Alberto Gomez.

In 2012, Scarlet made her debut as a theater actress in the stage play Las Quiero a las dos in Miami where she played the role of a married man's mistress.

She returned to her native country of Venezuela to star as the protagonist in the telenovela Dulce Amargo after 12 years of working abroad. The last telenovela she recorded in Venezuela was Mis 3 hermanas.

== Filmography ==
=== Film ===
| Year | Title | Role |
|---|---|---|
| 2015 | Santiago, el apostol | Maria de Nazareth |

=== Television ===
| Year | Title | Role | Notes |
|---|---|---|---|
| 1994-1996 | Nubeluz | Host / Dalina | |
| 1997 | Llovizna | Yolanda Sánchez / Llovizna | |
| 1998 | Niña mimada | Federica | |
| 1999 | Yo soy Betty, la fea | Alejandra Zingg | |
| 1999 | Luisa Fernanda | Luisa Fernanda Riera | |
| 2000 | Mis 3 hermanas | Lisa Estrada Rossi | |
| 2001 | Secreto de amor | María Clara Carvajal | |
| 2003 | Todo sobre Camila | Camila Montes de Alba | |
| 2004 | Todos quieren con Marilyn | Marilyn | |
| 2006 | Mi vida eres tú | Daniela Álvarez | |
| 2007 | Trópico | Angélica Santos | |
| 2008 | Amas de casa desesperadas | Susana Martínez (Susan Mayer) | |
| 2009 | Alma indomable | Alma Pérez Sorrento | |
| 2011 | Rafaela | Rafaela | |
| 2012-2013 | Dulce amargo | Mariana Wilhelm | |
| 2014 | Misterio's | Ana Raquel / Ana Valentina | |
| 2015 | Tómame o déjame | Ida | |
| 2015 | Escándalos | Briggitte Phillips | |
| 2017 | La fan | Salma Beltrán / Hilda | |
| 2017 | Rica, Famosa, Latina | Herself | Main cast; 35 episodes (season 6) |
| 2020 | 100 días para enamorarnos | Gloria Cruz | |
| 2021 | Esta historia me suena | Olga Salgado | Episode: "Tiempos mejores" |
| 2023 | Dramáticas | Marilyn Ortiz | |
