= María Teresa Rivas =

Mexican actress (1918–2010)

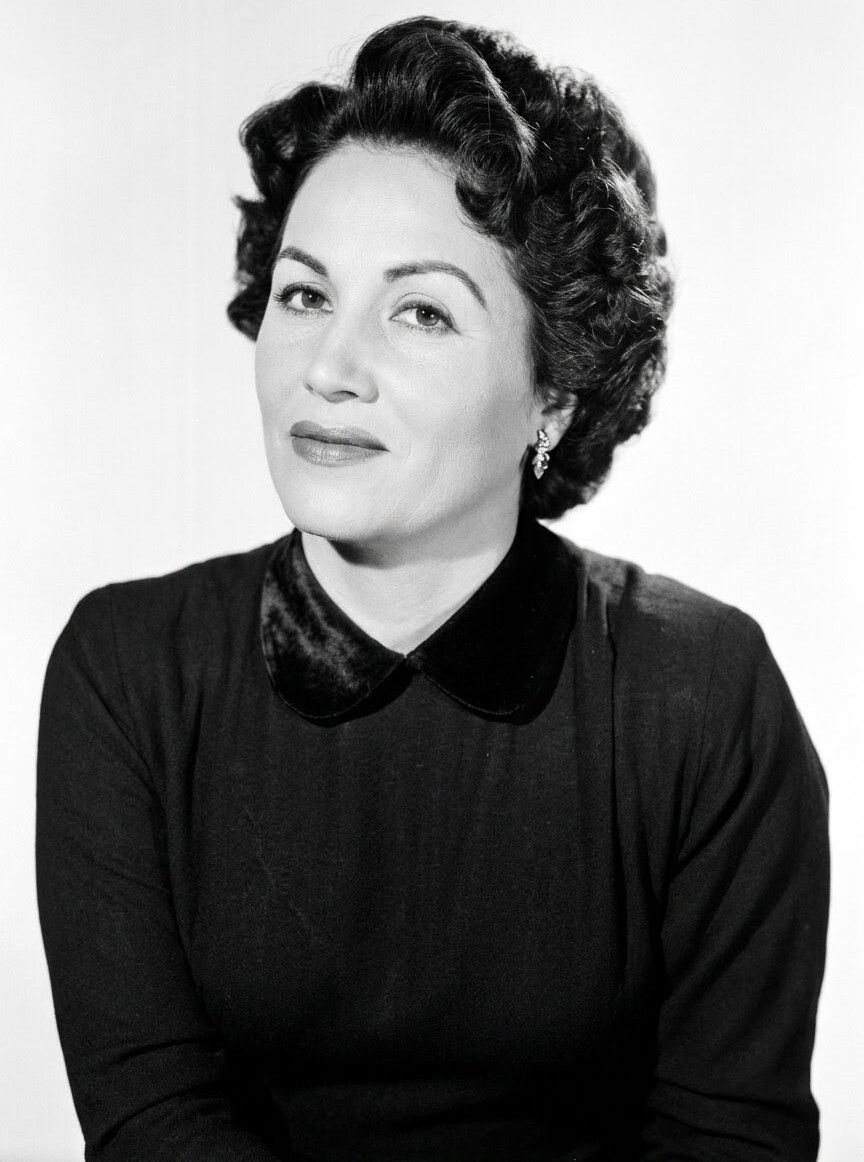
- Rivas in the 1960s
- Born: María Teresa Orozco Moreno; May 6, 1918; Unión de San Antonio, Jalisco, Mexico
- Died: July 23, 2010 (aged 92); Mexico City, Mexico
- Occupation: Actress
- Spouse: Federico López Rivas (died 1989)
- Children: 3

María Teresa Rivas (born María Teresa Orozco Moreno; May 6, 1918 – July 23, 2010) was a Mexican actress. Along with Silvia Derbez, she is considered one of the pioneers of telenovelas in Mexico, appearing in more than 50 in her career, beginning with an iconic villain role in Gutierritos (1958).

== Biography ==
María Teresa Rivas was born in Unión de San Antonio, Jalisco, on May 6, 1918. (Note: Some sources indicate that she was born in 1933. However, others, including members of her family, indicate that she was born in 1918.) She was baptized with the name María Teresa Orozco Moreno. She began her career as an actress in the 1950s, debuting in the film Tierra de hombres. She gained widespread notice in the 1958 telenovela Gutierritos, playing Rosa Hernández, the villainous wife of the protagonist.

She went on to have a prolific career that included film, theater, and television. She appeared in films such as Las señoritas Vivanco, Qué noche aquella, Simitrio, and 'Cuando los hijos se pierden. Her television roles included a variety of telenovelas, such as Una noche sin mañana, Las abuelas, 'Cruz de amor, Los ricos también lloran, Colorina, Bianca Vidal, Agujetas de color de rosa, and Amor gitano. She also excelled as a poet and composer, recording albums, and some of her songs were performed by singers such as Amparo Montes and Daniela Romo.

She married Federico López Rivas, and they remained together until his death in 1989. They had three children, and she eventually became a grandmother of nine and a great-grandmother of fifteen.

Her last major role was on the telenovela Carita de ángel, after which she retired from acting. She only made one further appearance, in a 2001 chapter of Mujer, Casos de la Vida Real.

María Teresa Rivas died at Santa Elena Hospital in Mexico City on July 23, 2010. The next day, she was cremated and her ashes were deposited at the Rancho "La Pitaya" in her hometown of Unión de San Antonio. Actors and friends such as Héctor Bonilla, Julieta Egurrola, and Leticia Perdigón came to express their condolences.

== Filmography ==
=== Telenovelas ===
- Gutierritos (1958) ... Rosa Hernández de Gutiérrez
- Claudia (1960)
- Gabriela (1960) ... Gabriela
- Una noche sin mañana (1961)
- La herencia (1962)
- Cumbres Borrascosas (1964)
- Marina Lavalle (1965)
- Las abuelas (1965)
- La dueña (1966) ... Silvia
- Las víctimas (1967)
- Cruz de amor (1968) ... Doña Delfina de los Monteros
- Lo que no fue (1969) ... Cristina
- Magdalena (1970)
- Yesenia (1970) ... Magenta
- Velo de novia (1971) ... Rita
- La señora joven (1972-1973) ... Martha
- Mi rival (1973)
- Nosotros los pobres (1973)
- Pobre Clara (1975) ... Doña Mercedes Escobedo
- Barata de primavera (1975-1976) ... Laura Palmer
- Pacto de amor (1977) ... Ruth
- Yo no pedí vivir (1977) ... Soledad Nájera
- Una mujer (1978)
- Ángel Guerra (1979)
- Añoranza (1979)
- Los ricos también lloran (1979) ... Sor Úrsula
- Verónica (1979-1980) ... Marcelina
- Colorina (1980-1981) ... Ana María de la Vega de Almazán
- Bianca Vidal (1982-1983) ... Esther Monasterio de Medina Rivas
- Amalia Batista (1983-1984) ... Doña Esperanza
- El precio de la fama (1987) ... Mercedes
- Balada por un amor (1989-1990) ... Victoria
- Capricho (1993) ... Doña Isabel, Montaño's widow
- Agujetas de color de rosa (1994-1995) ... Elvira Armendares
- La jaula de oro (1997) ... Ofelia Casasola
- Amor gitano (1999) ... Aya Petra
- Carita de ángel (2000-2001) ... Mother Superior from another school

=== TV series ===
- Puerta de suspenso (1959)
- Gran teatro (1964)
- Pardaillan (1981) ... Catalina de Médicis
- Papá soltero (1987) ... Clara (suegra de César)
- Televiteatros (1993)
- Mujer, Casos de la Vida Real (2001)

=== Films ===
- Con quién andan nuestras hijas (1956) ... Teresa
- Tierra de hombres (1956)
- El diario de mi madre (1958) ... Alicia
- Miércoles de ceniza (1958) ... Elvira
- El derecho a la vida (1959) ... Etelvina
- Las señoritas Vivanco (1959) ... Adelaida Covarrubias
- Qué noche aquella (1959)
- Simitrio (1960)
- The Illiterate One (1961) ... Sra. González
- Ellas también son rebeldes (1961) ... Margarita Godinez
- Guantes de oro (1961)
- Cri Cri el grillito cantor (1963) ... XEW Secretary
- Cuando los hijos se pierden (1963)
- He matado a un hombre (1964) ... Amalia Burgos
- Las dos rivales (1966)
- El proceso de Cristo (1966) ... Claudia
- Ven a cantar conmigo (1967) ... Director
- El corrido de "El hijo desobediente" (1968)
- Fando y Lis (1968) ... Mamá de Fando
- Paula (1969)
- La guerra de las monjas (1970) ... Doña Angustias
- Remolino de pasiones (1970) ... Sra. Landa
- La viuda blanca (1970) ... Victoria
- Siempre hay una primera vez (1971) ... Doña Raquel
- El esperado amor desesperado (1976) ... Albertina
- Visita al pasado (1981) ... Josefa
- Una leyenda de amor (1982)
- El maleficio 2: Los enviados del infierno (1986) ... Tía

=== Theater ===
- La señora en su balcón (1966), by Elena Garro
- Filumena Marturano (1957), by Eduardo De Filippo
- The Dance of Death (1970), by August Strindberg
- Hippolytus (1974), by Euripides
- La galería del silencio, by Hugo Argüelles

== Awards and nominations ==
- Nominated for Best Leading Actress for Capricho at the 12th TVyNovelas Awards (1994)
- Nominated for Best Leading Actress for Agujetas de color de rosa at the 13th TVyNovelas Awards (1995)
