= Capricho =

Mexican telenovela

- Genre: Telenovela
- Created by: Cuauhtémoc Blanco; María del Carmen Peña
- Directed by: Claudio Reyes; Luis Vélez
- Starring: Humberto Zurita; Victoria Ruffo; Diana Bracho; Juan Peláez; Patricia Pereyra; Armando Silvestre
- Opening theme: Erótica by Roberto Perera
- Country of origin: Mexico
- Original language: Spanish
- No. of episodes: 115

Production
- Executive producer: Carlos Sotomayor
- Producer: Rafael Urióstegui
- Production locations: Aguascalientes, Mexico
- Cinematography: Carlos Guerra
- Running time: 21-22 minutes
- Production company: Televisa

Original release
- Network: Canal de las Estrellas
- Release: January 11 – June 18, 1993

Capricho (English title: Whim) is a Mexican telenovela produced by Carlos Sotomayor for Televisa in 1993.

It stars Humberto Zurita, Victoria Ruffo, Diana Bracho, Juan Peláez, Patricia Pereyra and Armando Silvestre.

== Plot ==
The plot of Capricho takes place in Aguascalientes and revolves around the Aranda Montaño family. Eugenia Montaño (Diana Bracho) is a powerful and strong-willed woman, owner of "Viñedos del Sol", a renowned vineyard that has belonged to her family for decades.

Eugenia is married to Antonio Aranda (Juan Peláez), a writer with an affable and submissive character, deeply in love with his wife, with whom she has two daughters: the eldest, Raquel (Patricia Pereyra), and the youngest, Cristina (Victoria Ruffo).

However, Eugenia adores the former while she feels a deep contempt for the latter. Raquel, as evil as her mother, also despises Cristina. She is the girlfriend of Jorge (Jorge Antolín), an honest young man who sincerely cares for her, but she has never shown interest in him, unlike Cristina who loves him in secret.

Despite the disdain from her mother and sister, Cristina has always had the support of her father, Antonio, her uncle, León (Armando Silvestre), his wife, Mercedes (Silvia Mariscal), and that of Doña Isabel (María Teresa Rivas), her beloved grandmother.

Soon, in Cristina's life will appear Daniel Franco (Humberto Zurita), a handsome architect who comes from the capital to Aguascalientes to work on the construction project of a mall run by León and where Jorge works.

Both sisters fall in love with him, but Daniel sets his sights on Cristina, provoking the fury of Raquel and her mother who will make the girl's life miserable; all because of a whim.

== Cast ==
=== Main ===
- Humberto Zurita as Daniel Franco
- Victoria Ruffo as Cristina Aranda Montaño
- Diana Bracho as Eugenia Montaño de Aranda (villain)
- Juan Peláez as Antonio Aranda
- Patricia Pereyra as Raquel Aranda Montaño (villain)
- Armando Silvestre as León Aranda

=== Recurring ===
- Luis Aguilar as Don Jesús Tamayo
- Margarita Ambriz as Esperanza
- Jorge Antolín as Jorge Nieto
- Graciela Bernardo as Alicia "Licha" Gutiérrez
- Romina Castro as Teresa "Tita" Nieto
- Constantino Costas as Rubén Estrada
- Cuca Dublán as Gudadalupe "Lupita"
- Pilar Escalante as Sandra Ruiz
- Israel Jaitovich as Nicolás
- Marina Marín as Flora de Nieto
- Silvia Mariscal as Mercedes de Aranda
- Lucía Muñoz as Mónica
- Georgina Pedret as Nora
- Bruno Rey as Braulio Nieto
- Alejandro Ruiz as Fernando Peña
- Alejandro Tommasi as Tomás Ruiz
- María Teresa Rivas as Doña Isabel Viuda de Montaño

== Awards and nominations ==
Year	Award	Category	Nominee(s)	Result
1994	12th TVyNovelas Awards	Best Actress	Victoria Ruffo	Nominated
1994	12th TVyNovelas Awards	Best Antagonist Actress	Diana Bracho	Won
1994	12th TVyNovelas Awards	Best Leading Actress	María Teresa Rivas	Nominated
