= Claudia (Mexican TV series) =

- Genre: Telenovela; Drama
- Written by: Mimí Bechelani
- Starring: Maria Elena Marqués; Miguel Córcega; María Teresa Rivas
- Country of origin: Mexico
- Original language: Spanish

Production
- Production locations: Mexico City, Mexico
- Running time: 42-45 minutes
- Production company: Televisa

Original release
- Network: Canal 4, Telesistema Mexicano
- Release: 1960 – 1960

Claudia, is a Mexican telenovela that aired on Canal 4, Telesistema Mexicano in 1960. It starred Maria Elena Marqués and Miguel Córcega.

== Cast ==
- Maria Elena Marqués as Claudia
- Miguel Córcega
- María Teresa Rivas
- Manolita Saval
- Raúl Farell
- Roberto Cañedo
- Angelines Fernández
- Nicolás Rodríguez
- Graciela Doring
- Marcos Ortiz
- Emilio Brillas
- Marina Marín

== Production ==
- Original Story: Mimí Bechelani
- Adaptation: Mimí Bechelani
- Produced by: Colgate Palmolive
- Producer/ Director: Leopoldo Labra
