= Los Parientes Pobres =

Mexican telenovela

- Lucero and Ernesto Laguardia
- Genre: Telenovela; Romance; Drama
- Created by: Liliana Abud
- Written by: Carmen Daniels; Tere Medina
- Directed by: Miguel Córcega; Mónica Miguel
- Starring: Lucero; Ernesto Laguardia; Chantal Andere; Alexis Ayala; Nuria Bages; Joaquín Cordero; Humberto Elizondo; Maribel Fernández
- Theme music composer: Rafael Pérez-Botija
- Opening theme: Los parientes pobres by Lucero
- Composer: Pedro Plascencia Salinas
- Country of origin: Mexico
- Original language: Spanish
- No. of episodes: 75

Production
- Executive producer: Carla Estrada
- Producer: Arturo Lorca
- Production location: Tonatico, Estado de Mexico
- Cinematography: Alejandro Frutos; Manuel Ruiz Esparza
- Running time: 41-44 minutes
- Production company: Televisa

Original release
- Network: Canal de las Estrellas
- Release: May 3 – August 13, 1993

Related
- Mágica juventud; Dos mujeres, un camino; Juro que te amo (2008-2009)

Los Parientes Pobres (Poor Relatives) is a Mexican telenovela produced by Carla Estrada for Televisa in 1993. Lucero sang the main theme and it was an airplay hit in all Latin America. It was never released as a single, but it appears in the special album Lazos de Amor and her Lucero album known as Veleta.

Lucero and Ernesto Laguardia starred as protagonists, while Alexis Ayala, Chantal Andere, Humberto Elizondo, Maribel Fernández, Delia Casanova, Ana Patricia Rojo and the leading actress Bertha Moss starred as antagonists.

== Plot ==
Two families, the Santos and the Olmos, face a fight of power, ambitions, selfishness and love. The Santos are provincial family that has a pottery factory with financial problems, which Ramiro Santos (Rogelio Guerra) manages along with his cousin Evaristo Olmos (Joaquín Cordero). However, this business deal finishes due to personal differences, this provokes the rancor and hate of Ramiro, and his family goes into bankruptcy, while Evaristo Olmos achieves an excellent status.

When Ramiro dies, his family moves to the capital, hoping for a good fortune. But destiny will set a trap, when Evaristo offers his house for them to live, here his family treat them very bad, with contempt and haughtiness because they are the poor relatives.

== Cast ==
=== Main cast ===
- Lucero as Margarita Santos
- Ernesto Laguardia as Jesús "Chucho" Sánchez
- Chantal Andere as Alba Zavala
- Alexis Ayala as Bernardo Ávila
- Nuria Bages as María Inés de Santos
- Joaquín Cordero as Evaristo Olmos
- Humberto Elizondo as Paulino Zavala
- Rogelio Guerra as Ramiro Santos
- Delia Casanova as Eloísa de Olmos
- Fernando Casanova as Ricardo de Olmos
- Ana Patricia Rojo as Griselda Olmos
- Claudia Ramírez as Juliana Santos
- Maribel Fernández as Amalia de Zavala

=== Supporting cast ===
- Luis Gimeno as Marlon
- Eduardo López Rojas as Father Cayetano
- Bertha Moss as Aunt Brígida
- Guillermo Aguilar as Dr. Samuel Gómez
- Ernesto Godoy as Silverio Santos
- Alejandro Tommasi as Cristóbal
- Socorro Avelar as Toñita
- Rosario Zúñiga as Francisca Olmos
- Esteban Soberanes as Gabriel Olmos
- José María Torre as Luisito Santos
- Estela Barona as Alondra
- Patricia Martínez as Rosa
- Guy de Saint Cyr as Jean Paul Dominique
- Pituka de Foronda as Magdalena
- Oscar Servín as Francois
- Fabiola Campomanes as Elda
- Patricia Navidad as Esmeralda
- Consuelo Duval as Celina
- Susana Lozano as Pilar
- Paola Otero as Bertha
- Lorenzo de Rodas as Roque del Toro
- José Luis Castañeda as Erasmo
- María Luisa Coronel as Petrita
- Isabel Cortázar as Sandra
- Marco de Joss as Marco
- Carlos Osiris as Vago
- Rafael de Quevedo as Genaro
- Fernando Lavín as Chencho
- Sara Luz as Patricia
- Pedro Luévano as Manuel
- Pedro Morante as Don José
- Genoveva Pérez as Clementina
- Ivette Reyna as Flora
- Guillermo Sauceda as Ignacio
- Rafael Bazán as Pelón
- Angélica Soler as Lidia
- Margarita Valencia as Isidra
- Isabel Martínez "La Tarabilla"
- Amparo Montes
- Mauricio Ferrari
- Bárbara Córcega
- Guadalupe Bolaños
- José Antonio Ferral

== Awards ==
Year	Award	Category	Nominee	Result
1994	12th TVyNovelas Awards	Best Telenovela of the Year	Carla Estrada	Nominated
1994	12th TVyNovelas Awards	Best Actor	Ernesto Laguardia	Nominated
1994	12th TVyNovelas Awards	Best Antagonist Actress	Chantal Andere	Nominated
1994	12th TVyNovelas Awards	Best Antagonist Actor	Humberto Elizondo	Nominated
1994	12th TVyNovelas Awards	Best Leading Actor	Joaquín Cordero	Nominated
1994	12th TVyNovelas Awards	Best Young Lead Actress	Lucero	Won
1994	12th TVyNovelas Awards	Best Musical Theme	Lucero	Nominated
1994	4th Eres Awards	Best Telenovela		Nominated
1994	4th Eres Awards	Best Song	"Los Parientes Pobres"	Won
1994	4th Eres Awards	Best Actress	Lucero	Nominated
1994	4th Eres Awards	Best Actor	Ernesto Laguardia	Nominated
1994	25th ACE Awards	Best Actress	Lucero	Won
1994	A.C.C.A. Awards	Best Actress	Lucero	Won
