= Julieta Rosen =

Mexican actress (born 1962)

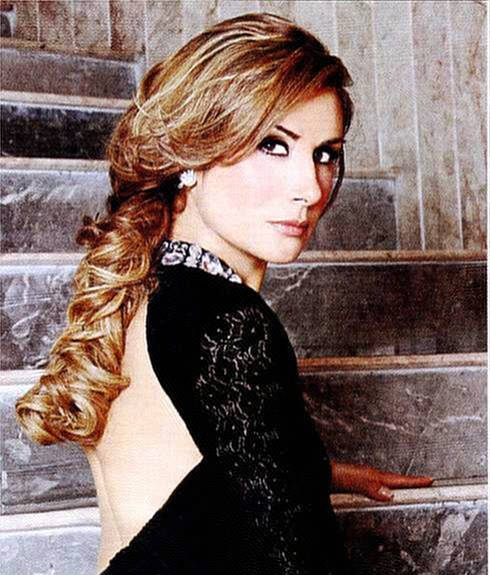
- Rosen in 2015
- Born: Julieta Rosen; 8 November 1962 (age 63); Mexico City, Mexico
- Occupation: Actress
- Years active: 1983–present

Julieta Rosen (Spanish pronunciation: [xuˈljeta ˈrosen]); born 8 November 1962 in Mexico City, Mexico) is a Mexican actress. Her father is Mexican and her mother is Swedish.

== Biography ==
She started her career at the age of 16 with the play Fulgor y Muerte de Joaquín Murrieta, at the University Theater "Carpa Geodésica", then started in her first professional role at the famous Teatro de la Ciudad with Don Juan Tenorio.

Her first telenovela was as "Julieta" in Un Solo Corazón with Daniel Martin. Many other telenovelas followed, like Encadenados with Christian Bach, Madres Egoístas with Orlando Carrio, and Infierno en el Paraíso with Juan Ferrara. She also played important roles in the historical television series Senda de Gloria and La Antorcha Encendida.

She was a series regular on the Columbia Tri-Star sitcom Viva Vegas starring Daniel Celario, Mario Celario, Ludo Vika, Mike Robelo, and Jossara Jinaro. In 2006 Rosen appeared in the telenovela Mi Vida Eres Tu, produced by Venevision. In 2008, she co-starred as Regina Sotomayor (Bree Van de Kamp) in the US Spanish language adaptation of Desperate Housewives.

In film, Rosen played the role of Esperanza de la Vega, wife of Diego de la Vega/Zorro in the 1998 movie The Mask of Zorro.

She is a former student of the Centro Universitario Anglo Mexicano.

== Filmography ==
Year	Title	Role	Notes
1982-83	Bianca Vidal	Enfermera	Supporting Role
1983-84	La fiera	Enfermera	Supporting Role
1983-84	Un solo corazón	Julieta	Protagonist
1984-85	La traición	Julia	Supporting Role
1987	Senda de gloria	Andrea Álvarez	Protagonist
1988-89	Encadenados	Blanca Lazcano	Main Antagonist
1989	Acorralado	Aurora	Film
1991	Madres egoístas	Raquel Rivas Cantú	Protagonist
1991	Mi querido viejo	María Luisa	Film
1993	Colmillos, el hombre lobo	Tara	Film
1996	La antorcha encendida	Manuela de Soto	Main Antagonist
1996	Confidente de secundaria	Cristina	Protagonist
1997	Perfect Target	Isabela Santiago Casillas	wife of President Casillas
1998	The Mask of Zorro	Esperanza De La Vega	Film
1999	Infierno en el paraíso	Fernanda Prego de Valdivia	Antagonist
2005–06	El amor no tiene precio	Coralia de Herrera	Supporting Role
2006	Mi vida eres tú	Ángela Borgia	Main Antagonist
2007	Bajo las riendas del amor	Eloísa Corcuera	Antagonist
2008	Amas de casa desesperadas	Regina Sotomayor (Bree Van de Kamp)	Main Role
2009	Vuélveme a querer	Valeria	Special Appearance
2010	Pecadora	Ámbar	Special Appearance
2010-11	Cuando me enamoro	Regina Soberón de Monterrubio	Adult Protagonist
2012	El Talismán	Elvira Nájera	Supporting Role
2015	Amor de barrio	Blanca Estela Bernal	Adult Protagonist
