= Teresa (1959 TV series) =

- Genre: Telenovela
- Written by: Mimí Bechelani
- Directed by: Rafael Banquells
- Country of origin: Mexico
- Original language: Spanish

Production
- Producers: Colgate-Palmolive; Telesistema Mexicano

Original release
- Network: Canal 4

Related
- Teresa (2010)

Teresa is a Mexican telenovela produced by Colgate-Palmolive Mexico and Telesistema Mexicano and originally transmitted by Telesistema Mexicano.

== Cast ==
- Maricruz Olivier as Teresa Martínez
- Aldo Monti as Mario
- Antonio Bravo as Héctor
- Luis Beristáin as José Antonio
- Beatriz Aguirre as Luisa
- Graciela Doring as Aurora
- Alicia Montoya as Josefina
- José Luis Jiménez as Papá de Teresa
- Maruja Grifell as Madrina de Teresa
- Fanny Schiller as Eulalia
- Antonio Raxel as Manuel
- Angelines Fernández as Esmeralda
- Enrique Cuoto
- Guillermo Rivas
