= Enrique Franco =

American songwriter

Enrique Franco Aguilar (Mazatlán, 19 December 1938) is a Mexican-born naturalized American songwriter.

Franco is known for avoiding, and being critical of, the narcocorrido genre.
