= Humberto Elizondo =

Mexican actor (born 1947)

Humberto Elizondo Kauffman (born July 19, 1947) is a Mexican actor of film and television, the son of Mexican diplomat Humberto Elizondo Alardine and Canadian actress Fannie Kauffman, conocida mundialmente como Vitola. Currently, he portrays Aquiles Trueba in Un refugio para el amor.

== Filmography ==
=== Film ===
- Veinticuatro horas de vida (1969) – (uncredited)
- La hermana dinamita (1970) – Invitado en fiesta
- El diablo en persona (1973) – Delfino
- El tigre de Santa Julia (1974) – Campesino herido (uncredited)
- Los vampiros de Coyoacán (1974) – Ticket clerk (uncredited)
- Zona roja (1976)
- El mexicano (1977)
- Mil caminos tiene la muerte (1977) – Crooked detective
- Las mariposas disecadas (1978)
- El arracadas (1978) – Huesos
- Muerte a sangre fría (1978)
- El circo de Capulina (1978)
- No tiene la culpa el Indio (1978) – Mozo Hotel
- Llámenme Mike (1979) – Rampazo
- Un cura de locura (1979)
- El valiente vive... hasta que el cobarde quiere (1979) – Martín
- Bloody Marlene (1979) – Sherriff I
- Pasión por el peligro (1979)
- El futbolista fenómeno (1979) – Extraterrestre
- Midnight Dolls (1979)
- Las golfas del talón (1979)
- El Año de la Peste (1979) – R. C. Jiménez, reportero
- Perro callejero (1980)
- El siete vidas (1980)
- Las tentadoras (1980)
- Mírame con ojos pornográficos (1980) – Vendedor
- Persecución y muerte de Benjamín Argumedo (1980)
- Los mantenidos (1980)
- El preso No. 9 (1981)
- Perro callejero II (1981) – Chava
- El gran triunfo (1981)
- El gran perro muerto (1981) – Cabo Valdemar
- Ni modo... así somos (1981)
- Como México no hay dos (1981) – Miguel
- Las siete cucas (1981)
- Solo para damas (1981)
- La muerte del Palomo (1981)
- El rey de los albures (1982)
- Juan Charrasqueado y Gabino Barrera, su verdadera historia (1982)
- Cosa fácil (1982) – Cuervo Valdivia
- El Bronco (1982)
- El anima de Sayula (1982)
- Me lleva la tristeza (1983)
- Eréndira (1983) – Blacaman
- Dos de abajo (1983) – Teniente
- Buenas, y con... movidas (1983)
- Por un vestido de novia (1983)
- Escuela de placer (1984)
- Siempre en domingo (1984) – Humberto
- Dune (1984) – Czigo (uncredited)
- Gatilleros del Rio Bravo (1984) – Figurin
- El otro (1984)
- El judicial (1984)
- Historias violentas (1985) – (segment 5 "Noche de paz")
- Más vale pájaro en mano (1985)
- El rey de la vecindad (1985) – Marcos
- Salvador (1986) – Road Block Thug
- El cafre (1986) – Policía
- Huele a gas (1986)
- El hijo de Pedro Navaja (1986) – Filos
- Yako, cazador de malditos (1986) – El 'Zargo'
- Un hombre violento (1986)
- Tierra de rencores (1986) – Epifanio
- Ratas de la ciudad (1986)
- Mentiras (1986) – Don Gabriel
- La leyenda del Manco (1987)
- El macho (1987)
- Don't panic (1987) – T.V. Reporter
- Los plomeros y las ficheras (1988)
- Pancho el Sancho (1988)
- Sabado D.F. (1988)
- Los hermanos machorro (1988)
- Los albureros (1988) – El Mamey
- Central camionera (1988)
- Licence to Kill (1989) – Hotel Assistant Manager
- Los rateros (1989)
- Te gustan, te las traspaso (1989)
- Si mi cama hablara (1989)
- Rosa de dos aromas (1989) – Molina
- La muerte del portero (1989)
- Fiesta de sangre (1989)
- Dos camioneros con suerte (recongidos en cancus)
- Arriba el telón
- El mofles en Acapulco (1990)
- Dos cuates a todo dar (1990)
- Sentencia de muerte (1990)
- Secta satanica: El enviado del Sr. (1990)
- No hay quinto malo (1990)
- La chica del alacrán de oro (1990)
- Brutalidad judicial (1990)
- Hembra o macho (1991)
- Burbujas de amor (1991)
- Desvestidas y alborotadas (1991)
- Tijeras de papel (1991)
- Sabueso (1991)
- Polvo de muerte (1991)
- Federal de narcoticos (Division Cobra) (1991)
- Traficantes de niños (1992)
- El secuestro de un periodista (1992) – Lic. Arnaiz
- Imperio blanco (1992)
- Culpable o inocente (1993)
- Gunmen (1993) – Guzman
- Amor a la medida (1993) – Ernesto Franco
- Suerte en la vida (La Lotería III) (1994)
- El aguinaldo (1997)
- The Mask of Zorro (1998) – Don Julio
- Soy el jefe de jefes (1998)
- La venganza del viejito (1998)
- El cuervo (1998)
- Soy el jefe de jefes (1999)
- Reclusorio III (1999)
- Bandidas (2006) – Governor
- Morirse en domingo (2006) – Calderon
- El cártel (2009) – Pedro Santana
- Los Siete (2010) – Francisco Zuñiga
- La cebra (2011) – General Quesada

=== Television ===
- Cuna de lobos (1986) – Inspector Norberto Suárez
- Un rostro en mi pasado (1990) – Rafael Reyes
- Triángulo (1992) – Arcadio Villafranca
- Los parientes pobres (1993) – Paulino Zavala
- El vuelo del águila (1994) – Manuel Mondragón
- Agujetas de color de rosa (1994) – Tomás
- La antorcha encendida (1996) – Hermenegildo Galeana
- La usurpadora (1998) – Silvano Piña
- Camila (1998) – Lic. Darío Suárez
- Nunca te olvidaré (1999) – Fermín Requena
- Cuento de Navidad (1999) – Samuel
- Carita de ángel (2000) – Salomón Alvarado
- Abrázame muy fuerte (2000–2001) – Bernal Orozco
- Salomé (2001) – Emilio
- Entre el amor y el odio (2002) – Dr. Ortega
- ¡Vivan los niños! (2002–2003) – Juez Mazagatos
- Velo de novia (2003) – Pedro Robletos
- Contra viento y marea (2005) – Quiñones
- Duelo de pasiones (2006) – Lic. Mauro Peña
- Tormenta en el paraíso (2007) – Lic. Alberti
- Mañana es para siempre (2008–2009) – Agustín Astorga
- La que no podía amar (2011–2012) – Federico Galván
- Un refugio para el amor (2012) – Aquiles Trueba Tajonar
- Porque el amor manda (2012–2013) – Augusto Constante
- Por siempre mi amor (2013–2014) – Osvaldo de la Riva
- Hasta el fin del mundo (2014–2015) – Carlos Landa
- Como dice el dicho (2015–2016) – Ricardo / Don Antonio
- Simplemente María (2015–2016)as Adolfo Rivapalacio Balaguer
- Sin tu mirada (2018) – Dr. Horacio Zamudio
- Mi marido tiene familia (2018) – Fantasma de la Navidad
- Malverde: El Santo Patrón (2021) – Padre Hilario
- Corona de lágrimas – Ulloa
- Juegos de amor y poder – Fermín Ferrer
- Amanecer (2025) – Justo Montalbán
