= Madres egoístas (1963 TV series) =

- Genre: Telenovela
- Directed by: Jesús Valero
- Starring: Carlos Navarro; Blanca Sánchez
- Country of origin: Mexico
- Original language: Spanish

Production
- Executive producer: Valentín Pimstein

Original release
- Network: Telesistema Mexicano
- Release: 1963

Related
- Madres egoístas (1991)

Madres egoístas is a Mexican telenovela produced by Televisa for Telesistema Mexicano in 1963.

== Cast ==
- Carlos Navarro
- Blanca Sánchez
- María Idalia
- Patricia Morán
