= El cuarto mandamiento (TV series) =

Mexican telenovela

- Genre: Telenovela
- Written by: Mimí Bechelani
- Country of origin: Mexico
- Original language: Spanish

Original release
- Network: Telesistema Mexicano
- Release: 1967

El cuarto mandamiento (English: The fourth commandment) is a 1967 Mexican telenovela produced by Televisa and originally transmitted by Telesistema Mexicano.

== Cast ==
- Lupita Lara - Olivia
- Guillermo Zetina
- Pituka de Foronda
- Gloria Leticia Ortiz
