= Orlando Carrió =

Argentine-Mexican actor

- Born: Orlando Anibal Carrió Vicidomini; August 5, 1955; La Plata, Buenos Aires, Argentina
- Died: May 26, 2002 (aged 46); Mexico City, Mexico
- Occupation: Actor
- Years active: 1981-2002

Orlando Anibal Carrió Vicidomini (5 August 1955 – 26 May 2002) was an Argentine-Mexican actor. He died from lung cancer on 26 May 2002.

== Filmography ==
- Aprender a vivir (1982)
- Entre el amor y el poder (1984)
- Yolanda Luján (1984)
- El Pulpo negro (1985)
- De carne somos (1988)
- Rebelde (1989)
- Mi pequeña Soledad (1990)
- Madres egoistas (1991)
- Las secretas intenciones (1992)
- Dulce Ana (1995)
- Los Ángeles no lloran (1996)
- Los Herederos del poder (1997)
- Ricos y Famosos (1997)
- Señoras sin señores (1998)
- Mi destino eres tú (2000)
- Sin pecado concebido (2001)
