= 2025 Premios Juventud =

2025 award ceremony

22nd Premios Juventud
- Date: September 25, 2025
- Location: Figali Convention Center; Fort Amador, Panama
- Hosted by: Clarissa Molina, Alejandra Espinoza and Nadia Ferreira
- Most nominations: Bad Bunny and Danny Ocean (6)
- Website: Official page

Television/radio coverage
- Network: Univisión

The 22nd Premios Juventud were held on September 25, 2025, recognizing the best in pop culture of young Hispanic and Latino Americans in 2025. The ceremony took place at the Figali Convention Center in Fort Amador, Panama. It was simulcast by Univision, UniMás, Galavisión, and streamed on ViX. This was the first edition since the 2nd Premios Juventud in 2005 to not be held in July. (Note: The 17th Premios Juventud in 2020 was held in August, but was not classified as an in-person event due to the COVID-19 pandemic in Florida)

== Performers ==
The first artists who performed at this edition were announced on September 2nd, and more artists were announced in the following days through the Premios Juventud social media channels.

Artist(s)	Song(s)
Pre-show
Destino	"Máquina del Tiempo"
Main show
Willie Colón	"La Murga"
Samy and Sandra Sandoval	"Gallina Fina"
Los Rabanes	"Señorita A Mí Me Gusta Su Style"
Nando Boom; Natti Natasha; Dímelo Flow	"Dem Bow"
Boza; Farruko; Sech	"Robi-Rob's Boriqua Anthem"
Yami Safdie	"En Otra Vida"
Camila Fernández	"Retumbando En El Cora"
DND; R!ch Yashel	"Te Acuerdas?"
Sergio George; Carlos Vives	"Fabricando Fantasías"
Carlos Vives; Grupo Niche	"La Tierra Del Olvido"
Kevin Aguilar	"10MIL MARIPOSAS"
Bad Gyal	"Da Me"
Lola Índigo	"MOJA1TA"
Camilo	"Una Vida Pasada"
Natti Natasha	"Cuando Las Traje Aquí"
Maluma	"BRONCEADOR"
Farruko; Louis BPM; Makaco El Cerebro	"Pancc" "Oe Oe" "Canaima"
Xavi	"Corazón de Piedra" "La Víctima"
Emilia Mernes	"Bunda" "Perfectas"
Hamilton; Nanpa Básico	"Mi Reina"
Sech	"Novio No"
Esau Ortiz; Alemán; Víctor Mendivil	"Triple Lavada (Remix)"
Alleh & Yorghaki	"Capaz (merenguetón)"
Morat; Camilo	"Sin Ti" "Me Toca A Mí"
Marc Anthony; Wisin	"Que Me Quiera Má"
Omar Alfanno; Gaitanes; Erika Ender	"A Puro Dolor" "Muy Adentro de Mí" "Despacito"
Grupo Firme; Gloria Trevi	"El Beneficio De La Duda" "Súfrale"
Myke Towers	"Soleao" "Expectativas" "Tengo Celos" "Degenere"
Mari La Carajita	"Prefiero Llorar"
Silvestre Dangond; Fonseca	"Vestido Rojo" "La Indiferencia"
Boza	"Ella" "Hecha Pa’ Mi" "Orion" "Yaya"

== Winners and nominees ==
On August 13, 2025, Univision announced the artists selected for the "Artist 2 Watch" category, an initiative that highlights emerging performers considered to be promising names in Latin music. The seven chosen artists are: Andrea Bejar, Angélica García, Cachirula, Luz Gaggi, Maye, Paloma Morphy, and Renata Flores.

The list of nominees was announced on August 19. Bad Bunny and Danny Ocean led the nominations with six each. They were followed by Anitta, Beéle, Carín León, Emilia, Myke Towers, Netón Vega, and Peso Pluma, who each received five nominations.

The winners are listed in bold.

=== General ===
Artist of the Year

- **Karol G**
- Bad Bunny
- Beéle
- Carín León
- Myke Towers
- Natti Natasha
- Netón Vega
- Rauw Alejandro

Favorite Group or Duo of The Year

- **Morat**
- Fuerza Regida
- Grupo Frontera
- Mau y Ricky
- Rawayana

New Generation – Female Artist

- **De La Rose**
- Aria Bela
- Mari
- Yailin La Más Viral
- Yami Safdie
- Yeri Mua

New Generation – Male Artist

- **Roa**
- Alex Ponce
- Alleh
- Beéle
- Ca7riel & Paco Amoroso
- DND
- Kapo
- La Cruz
- Leo Rizzi
- Yorghaki

New Generation – Mexican Music

- **Tito Double P**
- Calle 24
- Camila Fernández
- Clave Especial
- Esaú Ortiz
- Kevin Aguilar
- Línea Personal
- Macario Martínez
- Netón Vega
- Victor Mendivil

Girl Power

- **"En 4" – Kenia OS & Anitta**
- "Amiga Date Cuenta" – Ha*Ash & Thalía
- "Blackout" – Emilia, Tini & Nicki Nicole
- "Chulo Pt.2" – Bad Gyal, Tokischa & Young Miko
- "Mi Rey, Mi Santo" – María José & Ana Bárbara
- "Miumiu" – Sofía Reyes, Luísa Sonza & Rainao

OMG Collaboration

- **"Ojos Tristes (With The Marías)" – Selena Gomez, Benny Blanco & The Marías**
- "Dallax" – Feid & Ty Dolla $ign
- "Now Or Never" – Bon Jovi & Pitbull
- "Santa" – Rvssian, Rauw Alejandro & Ayra Starr
- "Tonight (Bad Boys: Ride Or Die)" – Black Eyed Peas, El Alfa ft. Becky G

The Perfect Collab

- **"La Cuadrada" – Belinda & Tito Double P**
- "Mercedes" – Becky G & Oscar Maydon
- "Perdonarte ¿Para Qué?" – Los Ángeles Azules & Emilia
- "Por Qué Será" – Grupo Frontera & Maluma
- "Vivir Sin Aire" – Maná & Carín León

Best Dance Track

- **"Como La Flor" – Play-N-Skillz, Natti Natasha & Deorro**
- "2 The Moon" – Pitbull, Ne-Yo, Afrojack, DJ Buddha
- "Corridos Y Alcohol" – Steve Aoki & Oscar Maydon
- "Savage Funk (DJ Snake Remix)" – Anitta & DJ Snake
- "Teka" – DJ Snake & Peso Pluma

=== Urban ===
Best Urban Track

- **"DTMF" – Bad Bunny**
- "57+" – Karol G, Feid, DFZM ft. Ovy On The Drums, J Balvin, Maluma, Ryan Castro, Blessd
- "Bing Bong" – Yailin La Más Viral & Puyalo Pantera
- "Degenere" – Myke Towers ft. Benny Blanco
- "Gata Only" – Floyymenor & Cris MJ
- "Hay Lupita" – Lomiiel
- "La Plena (W Sound 5)" – W Sound, Beéle & Ovy On The Drums
- "Polvo De Tu Vida" – J Balvin & Chencho Corleone
- "Savage Funk" – Anitta
- "Tommy & Pamela" – Peso Pluma & Kenia OS

Best Urban Mix

- **"Adivino" – Myke Towers & Bad Bunny**
- "Carbon Vrmor" – Farruko & Sharo Towers
- "Comernos" – Omar Courtz & Bad Gyal
- "Gata Only (Remix)" – Floyymenor, Ozuna & Anitta
- "Gatitas Sandungueras Vol.1" – Álvaro Díaz & Feid
- "La Nena" – Lyanno & Rauw Alejandro
- "Mamasota" – Manuel Turizo & Yandel
- "Mírame" – Blessd & Ovy On The Drums
- "Puro Guayeteo" – Wisin, Don Omar & Jowell y Randy
- "Teka" – DJ Snake & Peso Pluma

Best Urban Alternative Song

- **"Nubes" – De La Rose & Omar Courtz**
- "Chaparrita" – Standly & Yeri Mua
- "Real Gangsta Love" – Trueno
- "Tú Et Moi" – Judeline & Mc Morena
- "Tu Vas Sin (Fav)" – Rels B

Best Urban Album

- **Debí Tirar Más Fotos – Bad Bunny**
- Cvrbon Vrmor [C_de:G_d.O.N.] – Farruko
- Elyte – Yandel
- Funk Generation – Anitta
- La Pantera Negra – Myke Towers
- Mr. W (Deluxe) – Wisin
- Rayo – J Balvin
- San Blas – Boza
- Sayonara: Finales Alternos – Álvaro Díaz
- Tranki, Todo Pasa – Sech

=== Pop ===
Best Pop/Urban Song

- **"Soltera" – Shakira**
- "2am" – Sebastián Yatra & Bad Gyal
- "Anestesia" – Venesti, Goyo & Slow Mike
- "Cosas Pendientes" – Maluma
- "Latina Foreva" – Karol G
- "Nuevayol" – Bad Bunny
- "Orión" – Boza & Elena Rose
- "Priti" – Danny Ocean & Sech

Best Pop/Rhythmic Song

- **"Volver" – Piso 21, Marc Anthony & Beéle**
- "La_playlist.Mpeg" – Emilia
- "Ley Universal" – Danny Ocean
- "Loveo" – Daddy Yankee
- "Nota" – Jay Wheeler & Omar Courtz
- "Tamo Bien" – Enrique Iglesias, Pitbull & Iamchino

Best Pop Song

- **"Mientes" – Reik**
- "Bala Perdida" – Arthur Hanlon & Ángela Aguilar
- "García" – Kany García
- "Querida Yo" – Yami Safdie & Camilo
- "Samaná" – Mau y Ricky, Danny Ocean & Yorghaki

Best Pop/Rock Song

- **"Me Toca A Mí" – Morat & Camilo**
- "¿Cómo Pasó?" – Ela Taubert
- "Ojalá Pudiera Borrarte" – Maná & Marco Antonio Solís
- "Se Va La Luz" – Black Guayaba
- "Una Noche Contigo" – Juanes

Best Pop/Ballad Song

- **"Lo Que Nos Faltó Decir" – Jesse & Joy**
- "Abrázame" – Ángela Aguilar, Felipe Botello y El Sonoro Rugir
- "El Cielo Te Mandó Para Mi" – Ha*Ash
- "Palmeras En El Jardín" – Alejandro Sanz
- "Roma" – Luis Fonsi & Laura Pausini

Best Pop Album

- **Ya Es Mañana – Morat**
- A Mucha Honra – Thalía
- El Viaje – Luis Fonsi
- Haashville – Ha*Ash
- Hotel Caracas – Mau y Ricky
- Lo Que Nos Faltó Decir – Jesse & Joy
- Milagro – Sebastián Yatra
- Panorama – Reik
- Reflexa – Danny Ocean
- ¿Y Ahora Qué? – Alejandro Sanz

=== Tropical ===
Tropical Hit

- **"Si Antes Te Hubiera Conocido" – Karol G**
- "Ale Ale" – Marc Anthony
- "Baile Inolvidable" – Bad Bunny
- "Desde Hoy" – Natti Natasha
- "En Privado" – Xavi & Manuel Turizo
- "Fuera De Lugar" – Venesti
- "How Deep Is Your Love" – Prince Royce
- "Imagínate" – Danny Ocean & Kapo
- "Llorar Bonito" – Luis Figueroa
- "Raíces" – Gloria Estefan

Tropical Mix

- **"Capaz (Merengueton)" – Alleh & Yorghaki**
- "El Caballito" – Fariana & Oro Solido
- "Es Un Secreto" – Christian Alicea ft. DJ Buddha
- "Hoy No Me Siento Bien" – Alejandro Sanz & Grupo Frontera
- "La Culpa" – Kany García & Rawayana
- "Ohnana" – Kapo ft. Maluma, Ryan Castro, Farruko & Nicky Jam
- "Que Haces" – Becky G & Manuel Turizo
- "Santa Marta" – Luis Fonsi & Carlos Vives
- "Una Vida Pasada" – Camilo & Carín León
- "Vestido Rojo" – Silvestre Dangond & Emilia

Afrobeat of the Year

- **"Amor" – Danny Ocean**
- "Mi Refe" – Beéle & Ovy On The Drums
- "Soleao" – Myke Towers & Quevedo
- "Tengo Un Plan (Remix)" – Key-Key & Ozuna
- "Uwaie" – Kapo

Best Tropical Album

- **Natti Natasha En Amargue – Natti Natasha**
- Astropical – Bomba Estéreo, Rawayana & Astropical
- Ataca Sergio! Presents: Urban Salsa Sessions! – Sergio George
- Coexistencia – Luis Figueroa
- Cuatro – Camilo
- Eterno – Prince Royce
- Muevense – Marc Anthony
- Raíces – Gloria Estefan
- Reparto – Gente De Zona
- Yo Deluxe – Christian Alicea

=== Mexican ===
Best Mexican Music Song

- **"El Amor De Mi Herida" – Carín León**
- "El Amigo" – Christian Nodal
- "Mira Quién Lo Dice" – Pepe Aguilar
- "Perdonarte ¿Para Qué?" – Los Ángeles Azules & Emilia
- "Que Siga Pasando" – Chiquis

Best Mexican Music Fusion

- **"300 Noches" – Belinda & Natanael Cano**
- "Corazón De Piedra" – Xavi
- "Dos Días" – Tito Double P & Peso Pluma
- "Morena Canela" – Chino Pacas
- "Si No Quieres No" – Luis R Conriquez & Netón Vega
- "Tu Boda" – Oscar Maydon & Fuerza Regida

Best Mexican Mariachi Music

- **"Cuéntame" – Majo Aguilar & Alex Fernández**
- "Amé" – Christian Nodal
- "Mi Eterno Amor Secreto" – Yuridia & Eden Muñoz
- "Mis Amigas Las Flores" – Ángela Aguilar
- "Un Millón De Primaveras (En Vivo Desde La Plaza De Toros La México)" – Alejandro Fernández

Best Mexican Banda Music

- **"El Beneficio De La Duda" – Grupo Firme**
- "Aquí Hay Para Llevar" – La Arrolladora Banda El Limón De René Camacho
- "¿Qué Será De Mi Ex?" – La Adictiva
- "Tengo Claro" – Banda MS De Sergio Lizárraga & Alfredo Olivas
- "Voy A Levantarme" – Banda Los Sebastianes De Saúl Plata

Best Mexican Norteño Music

- **"Rey Sin Reina" – Julión Álvarez y Su Norteño Banda**
- "Aquí Mando Yo" – Los Tigres Del Norte
- "Bandido De Amores" – Leonardo Aguilar & Pepe Aguilar
- "Con Todo Respetillo" – Joss Favela & Luis R Conriquez
- "Traigo Saldo y Ganas De Rogar" – Eden Muñoz

Best Alternative Mexican Music

- **"Como Capo" – Clave Especial & Fuerza Regida**
- "Esa Noche" – Eslabon Armado & Macario Martínez
- "Holanda" – Línea Personal
- "Loco" – Netón Vega
- "Me Prometí" – Ivan Cornejo
- "Triple Lavada Remix" – Esaú Ortiz, Luis R Conriquez, Oscar Maydon, Alemán ft. Victor Mendivil

Best Mexican Music Album

- **Boca Chueca, Vol.1 – Carín León**
- Aquí Mando Yo – Los Tigres Del Norte
- Eden – Eden Muñoz
- Encuentros – Becky G
- Evolución – Grupo Firme
- Éxodo – Peso Pluma
- Jugando A Que No Pasa Nada – Grupo Frontera
- Mi Vida Mi Muerte – Netón Vega
- Next – Xavi
- Pero No Te Enamores – Fuerza Regida

=== Television ===
My Favorite Actor

- **Sebastián Rulli – El extraño retorno de Diana Salazar**
- Diego Klein – Con esa misma mirada
- Emmanuel Palomares – Las hijas de la señora García
- Fernando Colunga – Amanecer
- José Ron – Papás por conveniencia

My Favorite Actress

- **Angelique Boyer – El extraño retorno de Diana Salazar**
- Angélica Rivera – Con esa misma mirada
- Ariadne Díaz – Papás por conveniencia
- Livia Brito – Amanecer
- Oka Giner – Las hijas de la señora García

They Make Me Fall in Love

- **Angelique Boyer & Sebastián Rulli – El extraño retorno de Diana Salazar**
- Angélica Rivera & Diego Klein – Con esa misma mirada
- Ariadne Díaz & José Ron – Papás por conveniencia
- Claudia Martín & Daniel Elbittar – El amor no tiene receta
- Eva Cedeño & David Zepeda - A.mar

=== Digital ===
Creator of the Year

- **Jessica Judith Ortiz**
- Doris Jocelyn
- Federico Vigevani
- Isabella Ladera
- Jorge Chacón

Creator With a Social Cause

- **Alexis Omman**
- Aaron Murphy
- Alex Serrano
- Carlos Eduardo Espina
- Jesús Morales

Best LOL

- **Los Chicaneros**
- Alex Quiroz
- Dani Valle
- Edy Suárez
- Jose Ramones

#GettingReadyWith

- **Berenice Castro**
- Alex Barozzi
- Chantal Torres
- Florencia Guillot Dors
- Yayis Villarreal

Podcast of the Year

- **"Date Cuenta Podcast"**
- "El Bueno, La Mala Y El Feo"
- "Casados y Complicados"
- "Indomable con Regina Carrot"
- "Se Regalan Dudas"

Stream that Got Us Hooked

- **Karime Kooler**
- Emilio Antun
- Envinadas
- La Pija y La Quinqui
- La Más Draga

#AirplaneMode

- **Luisito Comunica**
- Alan Estrada
- Katy Esquivel
- Luz Carreiro
- Oscar Alejandro Pérez

Soccer POV

- **Ara y Fer**
- Esteban Cacho
- Jero Freixas
- Josh Juanico
- Laura Biondo
