= Vencer el pasado =

Mexican telenovela

- Genre: Telenovela
- Created by: Pedro Armando Rodríguez; Alejandra Romero
- Written by: Humberto Robles; Gerardo Pérez Zermeño; Luis Gamboa Gangoiti
- Directed by: Benjamín Cann; Fernando Nesme
- Starring: Angelique Boyer; Sebastián Rulli; Erika Buenfil; Africa Zavala; Manuel "Flaco" Ibáñez; Leticia Perdigón; Ferdinando Valencia; Horacio Pancheri
- Opening theme: "Vencer el pasado" by Ha*Ash
- Composers: J. Eduardo Murguía; Mauricio L. Arriaga
- Country of origin: Mexico
- Original language: Spanish
- No. of seasons: 1
- No. of episodes: 85

Production
- Executive producer: Rosy Ocampo
- Producer: Silvia Cano
- Production company: Televisa

Original release
- Network: Las Estrellas
- Release: 12 July – 5 November 2021

Related
- Vencer franchise

Vencer el pasado (stylized Vencer el p@sado; English: Overcoming the Past) is a Mexican telenovela that aired on Las Estrellas from 12 July 2021 to 5 November 2021. The series is produced by Rosy Ocampo. The series is the third production of the "Vencer" franchise. The series deals with many issues such as digital bullying, abuse of social media, and abortion. It stars an ensemble cast led by Angelique Boyer, Sebastián Rulli, Erika Buenfil, Africa Zavala, Manuel "Flaco" Ibáñez, Leticia Perdigón, Ferdinando Valencia, and Horacio Pancheri.

== Plot ==
The series follows four women who try to overcome misfortunes. Realizing that what is posted on social media is never erased, they must find a solution to live in the present and focus on a positive future if they want to overcome past obstacles.

== Cast ==
- Angelique Boyer as Renata Sánchez Vidal
- Sebastián Rulli as Mauro Álvarez
- Erika Buenfil as Carmen Medina
- Africa Zavala as Fabiola Mascaró
- Manuel "Flaco" Ibáñez as Camilo Sánchez
- Leticia Perdigón as Sonia Vidal
- Ferdinando Valencia as Javier Mascaró
- Horacio Pancheri as Alonso Cancino
- Otto Sirgo as Eusébio Valencia
- Valentina Buzzurro as Gemma Corona
- Dacia González
- Arantza Ruiz as Mariluz Blanco
- Roberto Blandón as Heriberto Cruz Núñez
- Beatriz Moreno as Doña Efigenia "Efi" Cruz
- Cynthia Alesco as Ana Solís
- Arena Ibarra as Natalia
- Luis Curiel as Rodrigo Valencia
- Miguel Martínez as Erik Sánchez Vidal
- Sebastián Poza as Ulises Cruz Medina
- Iván Bronstein as Isidro Roca Benavides
- Alberto Lomnitz as Arturo
- Andrés Vásquez as Dimitri "Dimi"
- Ana Paula Martínez as Danna Cruz Medina
- André de Regil as Oliver Cruz Medina
- André Real
- Camila Nuñez
- Carlos Bonavides as Father Antero
- Gabriela Núñez as Zoila
- Ignacio Guadalupe as Gaudencio
- Andrea Locord as Norma
- Elías Toscano as Benito
- Cruz Rendel as Eleazar Tolentino
- Fer Manzano Moctezuma as José
- Ricardo Manuel Gómez
- Leonardo Daniel as Lisandro Mascaró
- Diego Olivera as Lucio Tinoco
- María Perroni as Rita Lozano

=== Guest stars ===
- Claudia Álvarez as Ariadna López Hernández
- Matías Novoa as Claudio Fonssetti
- Gabriela Rivero as Brenda Zermeño Carranza
- Jade Fraser as Cristina Durán

== Production ==
The telenovela was announced on 12 January 2021. Production began on 8 April 2021, and ended on 28 August 2021.

== Episodes ==
| No. | Title | Mexico air date | U.S. air date | Mexico viewers (millions) | U.S. viewers (millions) |
|---|---|---|---|---|---|
| 1 | "Una marca que no se borra" | 12 July 2021 (Note: Premiered early online through Las Estrellas website on 9 July 2021.) | 12 October 2021 | 3.3 | 1.53 |
A video of Renata kissing a man at her bachelorette party goes viral and she is given the name #LadyCuernos. Renata and Alonso support each other in everything during their research project. Eleazar begins to be jealous of Mariluz for her likes on social media. Alonso feels disappointed when he sees Renata's video and makes it clear to Renata that he does not want to see her again in his life and ends up rejecting her at the altar.
| 2 | "Mostrar la peor cara" | 13 July 2021 | 13 October 2021 | 3.5 | 1.67 |
Alonso insults Renata, but she does not allow it and gives him a slap in front of all the guests. Alonso decides not to marry Renata and she faces the guests. Eleazar wants to go to the United States with Mariluz and he tries to convince her to accept. After canceling her wedding, Renata tries to rebuild her life, but is fired from her job and discovers that Alonso took over the atavistic kit. Carmen faces Heriberto.
| 3 | "Aguantamos todo por nuestra familia" | 14 July 2021 | 14 October 2021 | 3.7 | 1.41 |
Carmen is frowned upon at the club and Danna is bullied at school for her dad's viral video. Mariluz's photos go viral. Carmen confronts Heriberto about the viral videos. Mariluz's family is ashamed to see her intimate photos that have gone viral.
| 4 | "Quitar los prejuicios" | 15 July 2021 | 15 October 2021 | 3.3 | 1.24 |
Mariluz suffers the rejection of her family when they sees her intimate photos and her father no longer wants to have her around. Renata's family suspects that she is pregnant. Gaudencio is disappointed in his daughter and decides to kick her out of the house. Fabiola makes it clear to Claudio that there won't be a reconciliation and he decides to end their relationship forever. Fabiola agrees to be interviewed by Ariadna, but Ariadna decides to end the interview when she discovers that Fabiola is a misogynist. Ana calls Carmen to torment her about Heriberto's infidelity.
| 5 | "Aferrarse a alguien que no amas" | 16 July 2021 | 18 October 2021 | 3.2 | 1.59 |
Carmen and Heriberto argue and Danna feels guilty, since she knows that the problems started after she published the video of her father. Mariluz manages to get to safety. Mariluz and Norma try to denounce Eleazar for leaking Mariluz's intimate photographs, but when they try to report him they are made fun of. Danna accepts that she was the one who uploaded her dad's video. Mariluz tries to kill herself. Carmen sees that Heriberto is still with his lover, so she announces that they will separate. Renata has the desire to enter Biogenelab, but Fabiola humiliates her because of her video.
| 6 | "La ambición puede llevarnos a la cima de la vida" | 19 July 2021 | 19 October 2021 | 3.0 | 1.49 |
Mariluz, when she cannot bear the ridicule and criticism, decides to jump off the cliff, but realizes that she must face her problem. Renata suffers from the humiliation Fabiola does to her in the interview. Iñaki brings alcohol to the party and blames Danna for getting Larissa drunk, she has convulsions. Sonia gets sick and is taken to the emergency hospital. Danna is blamed for Larissa's alcoholic congestion. To avoid legal problems, Heriberto decides to run away with his lover and leave Carmen alone.
| 7 | "Ser el centro de atención" | 20 July 2021 | 20 October 2021 | 3.6 | 1.36 |
Heriberto has legal problems and decides to abandon his family. Renata continues to be attacked on social media. Carmen explodes when she does not know how to face her children. Gemma and Doña Efi remodel the rooms for rent and tell what happened to Doña Bárbara and Levita. Mariluz decides to go live in México City and receives the support of her brothers and her mother. Renata sneaks into the Biogenelab conference causing a problem. Carmen discovers that she has lost everything. Mariluz arrives in Mexico City.
| 8 | "La primera impresión es la que cuenta" | 21 July 2021 | 21 October 2021 | 3.4 | 1.41 |
Mariluz is approached by two women who try to take her things from her. Fabiola gets upset with her brother Javier because of his unexpected arrival. Mariluz arrives with Doña Efi and she is surprised to see her full of mud. Renata manages to have a job interview with Lisandro Mascaró. Carmen and her children are seized. Mariluz decides to change her look.
| 9 | "Empezar desde cero" | 22 July 2021 | 22 October 2021 | 3.4 | 1.51 |
Renata accepts Lisandro's proposal and goes to work at Biogenelab. Carmen and her children arrive in Mexico City with the help of Sammy. Renata confronts Fabiola on her first day at Biogenelab. Carmen and her children come to live in the apartment, but Danna and Oliver don't like their new home. Mariluz suffers because of what Benito tells her. Carmen runs out of money.
| 10 | "Cuando el destino nos cruza" | 23 July 2021 | 25 October 2021 | 3.1 | 1.68 |
In her own unique way, Gemma welcomes Carmen and her children to the apartment. Renata, Camilo and Sonia hide to prevent Fabiola from discovering that they are family. Carmen and Brenda manage to get in touch and make an appointment to see each other. Mariluz arrives at Biogenelab for an interview and Renata seeks to remove her viral video from the networks with the help of a lawyer. The lives of Carmen, Danna, Renata and Mariluz connect for the first time. Mauro tries to defend Fabiola, but she puts him in his place.
| 11 | "Pesadillas que se repiten en el tiempo" | 26 July 2021 | 26 October 2021 | 3.6 | 1.48 |
Carmen gets upset with Renata for having gotten into her argument with Danna and swears she will get her fired from the company. Mauro defends Fabiola, but she rejects him and is surprised to see him in the interview. Javier wants everyone to know that his father is not a good person. Mauro continues his interview with Fabiola. Danna feels uncomfortable with Brenda and the lies of her mother. Renata suffers harassment from Don Zacarías. Carmen receives a peculiar offer from Brenda to get money. Mauro wants to go to work at Biogenelab.
| 12 | "Controlar lo que sentimos" | 27 July 2021 | 27 October 2021 | 3.6 | 1.59 |
Renata stops Zacarias and asks Carla for an explanation for uploading the video that went viral. Mauro continues to want to take revenge on Lisandro. Doña Efi presents Mariluz with Gemma. Ulises helps her mother to match her clothes so that she can report to work. At Biogenelab, Mauro offends Renata, Carmen looks for work with Fabiola and Mariluz has her first test as a receptionist.
| 13 | "Sanar las heridas" | 28 July 2021 | 28 October 2021 | 3.5 | 1.50 |
Renata confronts Mauro in the laboratory. Fabiola decides to hire Mauro to support her brother Javier by being his assistant. Renata decides to erase all the photos that link her to Alonso. Rodrigo undergoes surgery and still cannot feel his legs. Mariluz celebrates her new job with Doña Efi. Claudio wants to be given the vice-presidency of Biogenolab. Carmen fights with Mariluz for the receptionist position. Renata meets Alonso at the reception.
| 14 | "Caras vemos, mañas no sabemos" | 29 July 2021 | 29 October 2021 | 3.8 | 1.41 |
Renata is surprised to learn that Alonso went to an interview at Biogenelab and does not like the fact that they will work together again. Ulises goes to the high school that Gemma recommended. Sonia gets nervous when she sees Alonso. Fabiola scolds Carmen, warning her that she can fire her even though she is recommended by her mother. Carmen is shocked to find out what Ulises wants to study. Rodrigo receives terrible news. Erik goes to work as a stripper. Alonso looks for Renata to ask for a new opportunity.
| 15 | "Crímenes por Amor" | 30 July 2021 | 1 November 2021 | 3.2 | 1.45 |
Alonso looks for Renata to ask for a second chance, but she rejects him. Rodrigo suffers knowing that he will never walk again. Mauro and Alonso are notified that they will be on probation to keep Javier's assistant position. Camilo introduces Sonia to Mauro. Mauro and Alonso are notified that they will be on probation to keep Javier's assistant position. Camilo introduces Sonia to Mauro.
| 16 | "Engañar a quien más queremos" | 2 August 2021 | 2 November 2021 | 3.4 | 1.49 |
When Paulina sees Rodrigo in a wheelchair, she is disappointed. Renata thanks Mariluz for having told her about Alonso. Fabiola confused by the anonymous messages. Fabiola gives Mauro a hug in gratitude for listening to her and Javier is surprised to see them very close together. Gemma advises Ulises to talk to his mother. Javier chooses his new advisor. Renata suffers a bicycle accident after being chased by Zacarias's men. Rodrigo checks Darío's things to find out where he really works.
| 17 | "Una verdad a medias" | 3 August 2021 | 3 November 2021 | 3.9 | 1.50 |
Mauro finds out that Renata is the daughter of Sonia and Camilo, but does not accept how Renata is ashamed of her parents' work. Rodrigo asks Darío for an explanation for lying about 'Mauro'. Renata thanks Lisandro for the advance and the payment to be able to pay off the debt. Darío 'Mauro' explains everything to Rodrigo and they remember the accident. Fabiola stops Carmen. Mauro apologizes to Renata. Oliver assures that Ulises is gay. Mauro feels bad for having to involve his brother in his revenge. Danna lies on her social media.
| 18 | "Los rumores son poderosos" | 4 August 2021 | 4 November 2021 | 3.7 | 1.44 |
Darío doesn't want to tell Rodrigo that his mother is alive. Oliver continues to attack Ulises for his preferences along with Carmen. Danna is attacked on social media for lying that she has money. Renata asks the engineer Mascaró to support her with a couple of assistants, Fabiola decides to get even with her and surprises her with her new work team. Carmen continues with the teasing of #LadyCuernos. Renata makes it clear to Alonso that they are just co-workers. Carmen and Mariluz become Renata's new assistants and Carmen suspects that Renata is Lisandro's lover.
| 19 | "Ignoramos a los que nos necesitan" | 5 August 2021 | 5 November 2021 | 3.6 | 1.55 |
Renata and Erik give Zacarias the first payment on the debt. Oliver returns very hurt after his fight. Oliver tells Heriberto that he is hurt and Heriberto complains to Carmen for neglecting her children. Carmen is reassured knowing that Oliver is fine. Alonso commits an indiscretion and announces that Sonia is Renata's mother, Fabiola becomes enraged and decides to fire Camilo and Sonia.
| 20 | "Todos tenemos debilidades" | 6 August 2021 | 8 November 2021 | 3.4 | 1.47 |
Fabiola complains to her father for siding with Renata but he replies that she could be his daughter and for now what matters most to him is that he give her a grandson. Alonso tells Renata that she should be careful because if things go well for her people might think that it is due to the fame she has, but she answers something that he does not expect. Fabiola tells Mauro that he asked Claudio to marry her, which takes him by surprise, but when they say goodbye they get dangerously close and kiss.
| 21 | "Lo que queremos o debemos hacer" | 9 August 2021 | 9 November 2021 | 3.6 | 1.58 |
Fabiola makes it clear to Mauro that they kissed because of the heat of the drinks, but that it should not happen again. Lisandro wants to know why Brenda rejects him and Brenda wants to know if he has slipped up. Carmen throws a cup of coffee and blames Mariluz for what happened, but Sonia does not allow her to humiliate her, so she puts her in her place. Renata asks for respect for her parents. Carmen begins to gossip about Renata. Renata begins to feel sick and faints in Mauro's arms. Carmen kicks Ulises out of the house.
| 22 | "Definir prioridades" | 10 August 2021 | 10 November 2021 | 3.4 | 1.50 |
Mauro takes Renata to the hospital. Mariluz realizes that Doña Efi wants the room for her nephew. Carmen kicks Ulises out of her house and he asks Gemma for help. Renata is surprised to learn that Mauro took her to the hospital and the doctor asks her to undergo some tests. Brenda does not understand Javier's attitude, she asks him to leave the resentment aside. Javier is still not over his separation with Mónica. Claudio agrees to stop working at Biogenelab to marry Fabiola. Lisandro congratulates Renata on the progress of her kit.
| 23 | "Nada nos pertenece" | 11 August 2021 | 11 November 2021 | 3.6 | 1.48 |
Claudio is upset to learn that Fabiola was just playing with him. Mauro continues to investigate the Fonssetti family. Carmen thanks Mariluz for her help. Claudio and his father look for Lisandro to complain about Fabiola's attitude and are interested in Renata's DNA kit. Lisandro puts a stop to his children. Carmen speaks ill of Renata. Renata is upset to learn that the Fonssettis want her kit and is shocked to see that the stored information has been lost.
| 24 | "Asumir las consecuencias" | 12 August 2021 | 15 November 2021 | 3.7 | 1.57 |
Sammy defends himself against Carmen and Ulises puts her in her place, but Carmen does not allow him to disrespect her. Mariluz moves into Bárbara Falcon's apartment. Mariluz is surprised to find Ulises in Gemma's room. Renata continues to have severe pain. Heriberto can now return to the city after receiving an injunction. Renata fights with Carmen and suspects that Danna was the one who erased all the information. Lisandro makes a decision that affects Renata's work.
| 25 | "Tomar las oportunidades como llegan" | 13 August 2021 | 16 November 2021 | 3.4 | 1.48 |
Renata is forced to accept Lisandro's proposal to work at Alonso's side to help her parents. Lisandro calls a meeting and informs that Alonso and Renata will work together and he needs everyone's support to finish Cansino's kit. Mariluz allows Ulises to stay in the apartment and he will help her change her image. Mauro finds a clue against the Fonssettis, Fabiola kisses him and Lisandro discovers them at home.
| 26 | "Culpar al destino" | 16 August 2021 | 17 November 2021 | 3.3 | 1.39 |
Lisandro is surprised to see Mauro at Fabiola's house. Mariluz confesses to Ulises that she works with his mother. Carmen suffers for Ulises. Claudio assures Fabiola that he can take his job. Alonso is happy to work with Renata to finish the kit. Ulises takes Mariluz to buy clothes. Gemma returns and begins to suspect that Mariluz is falling in love. Mauro is beaten during his investigation.
| 27 | "Señales de que algo no anda bien" | 17 August 2021 | 19 November 2021 | 3.4 | 1.29 |
Mauro is beaten up, but Doña Hortencia comes to his rescue. Carmen takes a trip on public transport thanks to Mariluz. Ulises offers to do Mariluz's hair and make-up, both pretend not to know each other in front of Carmen. Everything is ready for the presentation of the kit and the new area in Biogenelab. Mauro arrives with Hortencia to unmask the Fonssetti family. Ulises tells Mariluz that he likes her. Gemma meets Rodrigo in an accidental way.
| 28 | "Posibilidad de morir" | 18 August 2021 | 22 November 2021 | 3.4 | 1.49 |
Alonso claims that Renata is Lisandro's lover. Gemma introduces herself to Rodrigo. Ulises explains to Mariluz about his mother's prejudices and Danna interrupts them. Mauro flirts with Fabiola. Ulises offers Brenda a makeover. Gemma learns that Ulises is not gay and asks Mariluz to tell her if she likes him. Carmen discovers Ulises at Gemma's house. Renata receives bad news from her tests. Sonia is admitted to the hospital. Brenda suffers because of her weight. Fabiola questions Lisandro about Arturo Valencia.
| 29 | "No me quiero morir" | 19 August 2021 | 23 November 2021 | 3.3 | 1.59 |
Fabiola wants to know what happened with Arturo Valencia. Renata suffers when she learns of her diagnosis, but refuses to tell her family. Alonso insinuates that Mauro is interested in Fabiola. Sonia is stable after her operation. Lisandro wants to know what Mauro wants with his daughter. Carmen thanks Mariluz for having given her son a place to stay at Gemma's apartment. Mauro finds out about Renata's illness. Lisandro discovers that Javier gave information to Norberto Correa.
| 30 | "Tomar medidas" | 20 August 2021 | 26 November 2021 | 3.2 | 1.36 |
Lisandro assures Javier that Norberto is manipulating him. Mauro questions Renata about her illness. Camilo senses that there is something between his daughter and Mauro. Mariluz informs Fabiola about Renata's closeness with Mauro and also finds out about the gossip between Renata and her father. Renata puts a stop to Alonso. Gemma and Dimi meet again. Fabiola complains to Renata about the gossip with her father. Lisandro corners Javier to leave his position and names Alonso as the new director of Bioinformática.
| 31 | "Todas las cosas pasan por algo" | 23 August 2021 | 29 November 2021 | 3.6 | 1.73 |
Carmen wants to fight for half of the assets with Heriberto when she learns that he wants a divorce. Ulises asks Mariluz for a chance. Alonso is temporarily appointed as the director of Bioinformatics. Alonso tries to belittle Renata after being named director of Bioinformatics, but she humiliates him in front of everyone and helps Javier when she sees that he was beaten by a man in the pharmacy. Erick unmasks Yolanda. Carmen tells Brenda that Renata is Lisandro's lover. While trying to defend Renata, Camilo reveals that his daughter and Mauro are in a relationship.
| 32 | "Ser imprudentes" | 24 August 2021 | 30 November 2021 | 3.6 | 1.58 |
Camilo claims that Renata and Mauro are in a relationship and Renata affirms it. Javier is arrested for violence in a pharmacy. Brenda is surprised to learn that her son was arrested. Mauro gives Renata a week to clear up their alleged affair. Brenda, Fabiola and Lisandro go to the ministry to see Javier. Gemma and Dimi want Rodrigo to attend the talks and Dimi wants to be the cupid. Fabiola makes a proposal to Mauro and he accepts. Renata is moved to see the sample of her kit.
| 33 | "La vida te cambia en un abrir y cerrar de ojos" | 25 August 2021 | 1 December 2021 | 3.6 | 1.30 |
Gemma seeks out Rodrigo and opens her heart by telling him all about her terrible past and he promises to come to the talks. Mariluz agrees to take pictures with Ulises. Mauro goes away for the weekend with Fabiola. Renata tells Lisandro about the rumor of a supposed relationship with him. Brenda demands that Norberto leave her family alone. Mauro and Fabiola make love and both agree that everything is no strings attached. Renata discovers that her DNA is not compatible with that of her family.
| 34 | "En todas las familias hay secretos" | 26 August 2021 | 2 December 2021 | 3.4 | 1.29 |
Carmen suffers when she sees the photo of Heriberto with his mistress and her children give her all the support she needs to get ahead. Renata's surprise party begins. Mariluz, Gemma and Cristina arrive at Renata's surprise party and she reveals to her parents why she took the DNA test; the Sánchez Vidal family is united as a family. Carmen agrees to divorce. Mauro worries about Renata. Lisandro clarifies that there is no relationship with Renata. Fabiola wants to discover her father's mistress.
| 35 | "Relaciones que nacen para hacer pedazos" | 27 August 2021 | 3 December 2021 | 3.5 | 1.27 |
Lisandro Mascaró is in a relationship with Natalia. Camilo and Sonia suffer for not being Renata's biological parents. Carmen puts a stop to Heriberto. Minerva seeks out Erik to offer him money to spend several nights with her. Fabiola makes fun of Renata for keeping up a false rumor with Mauro. Camilo and Sonia don't understand what happened to their real daughter. Danna steals things from Fabiola and Brenda. Rodrigo learns about a terrible gossip from the past. Ulises and Mariluz kiss for the first time.
| 36 | "La confianza es ciega" | 30 August 2021 | 6 December 2021 | 3.3 | TBA |
Mauro decides to tell Rodrigo a part of his father's past. Renata wants to find her biological parents. Mariluz tells Gemma that Ulises kissed her. Sonia discovers that Erik has a large amount of money stashed away. Javier says goodbye to his father and sister, but asks Fabiola to watch out for Mauro, who he claims is a social climber. Lisandro threatens Mauro. Mauro accepts his relationship with Renata. Lisandro confronts Carmen about the rumor that he and Renata were having an affair; Fabiola announces that Carmen is fired.
| 37 | "Es difícil esconder cuando uno se enamora" | 31 August 2021 | 7 December 2021 | 4.0 | 1.60 |
Renata tries to do everything she can to not get Carmen fired, but Fabiola and Lisandro cannot forgive her. Mariluz tries to reassure Carmen after her firing. Mauro asks Renata to continue with the lie of their relationship and Renata makes fun of him for wanting to hide his relationship with Fabiola. Sonia discovers Erik making out with Minerva. Renata and Mauro kiss at a meeting to celebrate the launch of the atavistic kit. Danna confesses to having stolen from the Mascaró family and exposes Carmen to Brenda.
| 38 | "La incertidumbre nos asfixia" | 1 September 2021 | 8 December 2021 | 3.4 | 1.42 |
Javier is intrigued by the anonymous messages he receives. Mauro decides to take Renata to his house to continue with the lie of their relationship. Renata goes to the hospital to get information about her origin. Sonia sees Minerva giving money to Erik, so she confronts her to find out why she is giving money to her son. Renata investigates her true origin. Javier visits Fabiola to get a DNA test. Sonia and Renata find out where Erik works.
| 39 | "Siempre hay alguien que resalta" | 2 September 2021 | 9 December 2021 | 3.6 | 1.51 |
Sonia is furious with Erick and informs the whole family that Minerva is his Sugar Mommy. Carmen is very upset with Danna and tells Ulises what she did at Brenda's house. Carmen agrees to let Mariluz have dinner with her family but she and Oliver make fun of her roots. Camilo warns Erik that if he continues with his work he will have to leave the house. Alonso wants Renata to give him all of her kit's reports. Erick decides to break up with Minerva. Renata continues investigating at the hospital and Nieves Ochoa fears she will be discovered.
| 40 | "Favor con favor se paga" | 3 September 2021 | 10 December 2021 | 3.7 | 1.55 |
Renata tells Camilo, Sonia and Erick that she will continue looking for her biological family, because she knows that the day she was born there were only 5 other girls in the same hospital. Mauro tells Fabiola about all the benefits that Lisandro gave Alonso, and she is surprised to learn that. Javier asks Renata to get the DNA results of some samples, to which she agrees in exchange for Carmen's return to her job. Alonso asks Lisandro why he summoned him so far away if he does not have to justify his new position, but Lisandro replies that he has put himself on the spot.
| 41 | "Ir un paso adelante" | 6 September 2021 | 13 December 2021 | 3.9 | 1.63 |
Alonso manages to make an alliance with Lisandro. Renata continues with her research. Carmen asks Brenda for help to return to Biogenelab. Mauro and Renata continue to pretend in front of everyone about their relationship and he gives her important information about her kit, reaffirms his support in everything and they both flirt. Gemma provokes Rodrigo's anger. Ulises kisses Mariluz, but would rather stop than commit something they might regret. Carmen returns to Biogenelab. Mauro manages to get information from Alonso's cell phone. Javier discovers a terrible truth.
| 42 | "Enseñar las garras" | 7 September 2021 | 14 December 2021 | 3.3 | 1.58 |
Javier confesses to Renata that he is not Lisandro's son and she shows her support. Sonia wants to know what happened to her real daughter. Javier confronts Brenda to find out who his real father is. Heriberto scolds Danna for her videos. Fabiola gets jealous when she sees Renata very close to Mauro. Oliver gets into trouble when he causes Juan Pablo to fall. Javier finds out that Fabiola knows they are half siblings. Mauro discovers that Alonso is Lisandro's accomplice.
| 43 | "Cómplices" | 8 September 2021 | 15 December 2021 | 3.8 | 1.67 |
Fabiola asks Javier to grow up and stop badmouthing her father. Javier assures her that she will be left alone. Mauro has the evidence against Lisandro. Javier confronts Lisandro and takes the opportunity to record their conversation. Gemma and Rodrigo argue again, but she gets him to want to accompany her to the park. Renata discovers the relationship between Fabiola and Mauro and thanks to this she gets Fabiola to pay Carmen overtime. Lucio defends his son and threatens Oliver. Javier opens his heart to Renata.
| 44 | "Ninguna decisión es para siempre" | 9 September 2021 | 16 December 2021 | 3.9 | 1.53 |
Mauro rejects Fabiola's proposal. Renata sends Javier to the friendzone, confessing that Mauro is not her boyfriend. Rodrigo is uncomfortable with Mariluz's presence. Renata plans to go public with her supposed breakup. Lisandro asks Fabiola to consider giving him a grandchild. Heriberto forces Danna to record a video apologizing for her dances. Heriberto complains to Lucio. Javier decides to move into the Mascaró mansion. Fabiola wants a child from Mauro.
| 45 | "No me puedo dejar caer" | 10 September 2021 | 17 December 2021 | 3.5 | 1.51 |
Fabiola proposes to Mauro to conceive a son, but he immediately rejects her proposal. Gemma wants to know about Rodrigo's accident. Mauro decides to move forward with his plan to unmask Lisandro. Sammy defends Ulises and exposes Heriberto's anti-tolerant behavior. Javier surprises Renata by bringing her flowers. Renata recognizes that this is no time to be weak. Mariluz's past makes an unexpected return. Carmen feels she is a bad mother. Danna makes plans to see her virtual friend.
| 46 | "Adentrarse en el pasado" | 13 September 2021 | 20 December 2021 | 3.7 | 1.60 |
Gino introduces himself to Danna and she is fascinated. Carmen and Mariluz worry about Renata's health. Mauro is ready to expose Alonso. Renata questions her doctor to find out how long she has left to live. Carmen asks Danna to go back to the house. Mariluz receives more messages from Ezequiel. Heriberto has an accident when he sees Danna's video. Carmen discovers Ulises and Mariluz's relationship. Mauro sends a note that damages Lisandro and Alonso.
| 47 | "El reconocimiento es algo que todos deseamos" | 14 September 2021 | 21 December 2021 | 4.1 | 1.69 |
Carmen does not accept that Mariluz is with Ulises because they are from a different social class. Lisandro and Alonso are surprised by the leaked audio and everyone wants to resolve the news. Lisandro orders Alonso to be beaten for the publication of the audio and demands his resignation as director of bioinformatics. Mauro prefers only to have a working relationship with Fabiola. Renata is questioned at the press conference to clarify the theft of the atavistic kit. Mauro offers his full support to Renata when he discovers that she requires a liver transplant.
| 48 | "Lo que nos define ante los demás" | 15 September 2021 | 22 December 2021 | 3.0 | 1.72 |
Mauro is willing to support Renata in everything. Gino surprises Danna with a kiss on the mouth. Oliver and Juan Pablo are scolded for hitting each other. Juan Pablo confesses to Lucio why he hit Oliver and Oliver seeks revenge. Lisandro makes it clear to Alonso that Mauro is now the new director of Bioinformática. The Sánchez Vidal's meet Abel. Mariluz opens her heart to Ulises; Oliver discovers Mariluz's secret. Lisandro confronts Fabiola and Mauro for hiding their relationship.
| 49 | "Dejar una huella en el mundo" | 16 September 2021 | 23 December 2021 | 3.8 | TBA |
Ulises tells Mariluz not to worry because he will always be by her side. Mauro makes it clear to Lisandro that he has a serious relationship with Fabiola. Oliver tells Ulises that Mariluz's photos are on an adult website. Eleazar steals money. Fabiola stresses to Renata that her relationship with Mauro is now formal and mocks her jealousy. Mariluz suffers when she learns that Oliver saw her photos and lives a nightmare. Carmen discovers Mariluz's intimate photos. Renata, with Cristina's help, continues investigating her past.
| 50 | "Cuando algo camina mal" | 17 September 2021 | 27 December 2021 | 3.6 | TBA |
Lucio talks to Carmen about the photos that Oliver sent to his son and Carmen scolds Oliver. Gemma tries to console Mariluz. Renata sends hints to Mauro about his relationship with Fabiola. Mauro defends Camilo from Alonso's insults. Carmen shows Fabiola the photos of Mariluz in order to get rid of her. Renata and Cristina find Alondra's grave. Ulises puts a stop to Eleazar. Rodrigo makes plans to see Javier.
| 51 | "Buscar un culpable" | 20 September 2021 | 28 December 2021 | 3.9 | TBA |
Javier despairs at not being able to obtain more information and decides to leave. Renata continues the investigation together with Cristina. Rodrigo demands Gemma to leave him alone. Javier reveals to Renata how much he enjoys spending time with her and that he would like to be by her side. Rodrigo wants Gemma fired. Mariluz plans to leave Gemma's apartment. Renata consoles Mariluz and tries to fix her problems with Carmen, but things get complicated when Danna interferes. Fabiola explodes when she discovers Renata's interview.
| 52 | "Hacer caso al corazón" | 21 September 2021 | 29 December 2021 | 3.7 | TBA |
Fabiola is upset to learn that Renata was the one who gave the interview to the magazine. Javier introduces Erick to his mother to be her new driver. Sonia supports Carmen at the reception. Lisandro wants to know more about Mauro's personal life. Gino tries to convince Danna to work for him so he can get a cell phone. Lucio asks Oliver to respect his mother. Erik soaks Fabiola and she is furious. Renata agrees to give Javier a chance and they kiss. Renata tells Mauro that she suspects he is hiding something. Ulises continues to support Mariluz.
| 53 | "Protagonistas de forma inesperada" | 22 September 2021 | 30 December 2021 | 3.7 | TBA |
Renata decides to give herself a chance with Javier and Mauro is interested in knowing if she has a relationship with him, but she decides not to talk about her private life. Carmen does not want to work with Mariluz. Rodrigo finds the photo that Mauro kept. Lucio asks Carmen for her phone number. Gino takes the opportunity to introduce himself to Carmen and gain Danna's trust. Gemma and Rodrigo kiss but Rodrigo offends her. Ulises proposes to Mariluz to make love. Javier introduces Renata as his girlfriend. Brenda suffers a mishap because of her diet.
| 54 | "Todos cometemos errores" | 23 September 2021 | 3 January 2022 | 3.6 | 1.84 |
Brenda is rushed to the hospital after collapsing because of her diet and the girdles she wore. Fabiola and Lisandro complain to Javier, but Mauro asks them to control themselves. Mauro gives Renata a ride and she notices the looks he gives her. Gemma continues to suffer for Rodrigo. Carmen agrees to have coffee with Lucio. Brenda confesses her unhappiness and complains to Lisandro for past actions. Carmen visits Brenda in the hospital. Danna agrees to work with Gino. Mariluz meets with Eleazar.
| 55 | "Malas noticias" | 24 September 2021 | 4 January 2022 | 3.5 | 1.98 |
Eleazar makes Mariluz believe that he has changed, but she does not believe him and demands that he leave her alone. Renata advises Mariluz to report Eleazar. Lisandro is upset to learn that Erick is Brenda's driver. Cristina and Renata support Mariluz in reporting Eleazar. Renata discovers that Alondra is the baby she was exchanged for. Gino gives Danna the drugs so that she can start selling them. Carmen discovers Lisandro's secret.
| 56 | "En carne propia" | 27 September 2021 | 5 January 2022 | 3.6 | 1.91 |
After learning that their daughter died, Sonia and Camilo grieve for the loss of their daughter. Eleazar intimidates Mariluz into giving him money. Mariluz, accompanied by Renata and Cristina, files a complaint against Eleazar and discovers that justice is looking for him. Mariluz is shocked to see Eleazar in Biogenelab; he kidnaps her, but Renata and Carmen join forces to save her.
| 57 | "Todos tenemos un objetivo" | 28 September 2021 | 6 January 2022 | 3.8 | TBA |
Mariluz, accompanied by Renata and Cristina, files a complaint against Eleazar and discovers that the police is looking for him. Ulises is confused after seeing Mariluz's photos. Fabiola wants to know who Rodrigo is, since he torments Mauro in his nightmares. Brenda wants to work at Biogenelab. Lisandro threatens Javier again. Heriberto wants his children close to him. Fabiola refuses to let Brenda be vice-president and Lisandro manages to manipulate her. Javier discovers Rodrigo's identity. Lisandro asks Mauro to help him get Javier out of the way.
| 58 | "Agarrar el toro por los cuernos" | 29 September 2021 | 7 January 2022 | 3.9 | TBA |
Alonso gets too close to Renata, but Mariluz returns to the lab and helps her. Brenda continues to believe that Lisandro is faithful to her and Carmen chooses not to tell her anything. Darío complains to Rodrigo for sneaking around with Javier Mascaró. Mariluz decides to end her relationship with Ulises after he offends her. Mauro and Renata are jealous of their partners. Danna is excited to learn that Gino might become her boyfriend. Carmen gives herself a chance with Lucio and they kiss.
| 59 | "Ocultar lo que sentimos" | 30 September 2021 | 10 January 2022 | 3.6 | 2.00 |
Lucio advises Carmen to tell Brenda the truth. Carmen decides not to see Lucio anymore. Fabiola seduces Mauro, but when they are kissing, he imagines Renata. Darío and Rodrigo make up. Carmen returns Lisandro's contract. Ulises is very sad about his breakup with Mariluz and Carmen decides to console him. Mauro accompanies Renata and helps her get information from Nieves. Rodrigo offers an apology to Gemma. Brenda receives Lisandro's contract with Natalia and decides to ask for a divorce.
| 60 | "Marcar el destino" | 1 October 2021 | 11 January 2022 | 3.3 | 1.86 |
Carmen asks Javier about Brenda after learning that her husband is cheating on her, but she commits the indiscretion of telling him that the person with whom Lisandro is cheating on his mother is Fabiola's friend. Javier tells Fabiola that Lisandro's mistress is Natalia, so she does not hesitate to insult her and fire her from the company despite the contract she signed with her father. Alonso gets upset when he sees Renata talking and although he doesn't let her scold him, Mauro arrives to defend her and put him in his place. Mauro tells Renata about Nieves' situation, so she thanks him for helping her.
| 61 | "El amor siempre termina haciendo daño" | 4 October 2021 | 12 January 2022 | 3.8 | 1.60 |
Renata questions Mauro, who tells her that he has good reasons to have lied in Biogenelab, but she asks him if Arturo Valencia has anything to do with it. Javier knows about Mauro's intentions with Renata, so he tells Fabiola that if someday her boyfriend leaves her for any reason, she should not suffer. Brenda and Lisandro argue but Javier can't help but step in when he starts to humiliate them and ends up punching him in the face. Renata informs everyone that the kit has been finished, so they are very happy and celebrate with the whole team.
| 62 | "No hagas cosas buenas que parezcan malas" | 5 October 2021 | 13 January 2022 | 3.8 | 1.90 |
The police arrive surprisingly at Renata's house to arrest Javier and although she asks them why they are taking him away, they only answer that he has an arrest warrant. Mauro tells Priscila that it is not convenient to tell Lisandro who he really is, since he might think they are accomplices and plan something against him. Brenda tells Fabiola that Lisandro not only accused Javier of industrial espionage but of embezzlement and money laundering. Renata tells Mauro that he surely helped Lisandro to put Javier in jail and she is ready to expose him.
| 63 | "Envenenarse el alma" | 6 October 2021 | 14 January 2022 | 4.0 | 1.80 |
Fabiola tells Mauro that she only makes excuses to see each other and that they have not been intimate for several weeks, but he replies that she should be aware of her brother's situation. Priscila tells Mauro that she already knows he is with Fabiola and for of her silence, she asks him to tell her how and where she can see her son. Fabiola suspects Mauro's estrangement so she decides to follow him, but finds him with Renata whom she begins to insult. Lisandro is disconcerted to hear that Renata will charge him for the development of the kit but she tells him that there is not a single record of Biogenelab supporting her.
| 64 | "El precio que hay que pagar" | 7 October 2021 | 17 January 2022 | 3.7 | 1.80 |
Fabiola tells Lisandro to fire Renata and stop her investigation, but he tells her that it is not in their best interest because she would take the kit elsewhere. Renata tells Mauro that Lisandro wanted to steal her kit but she confronted him, so he tells her that he knew she was a warrior and offers to take her wherever she wants. Carmen and Lucio are determined to move their relationship forward so they come up with the idea of having a dinner so their children can get to know each other, but Oliver becomes impossible. Threatened by Priscila, Mauro takes her to where Rodrigo is to see him from afar but Gemma becomes aware of her presence.
| 65 | "Lo más valiente es saber decir no" | 8 October 2021 | 18 January 2022 | 3.9 | TBA |
Griselda and Nieves tell Renata how much her mother suffered as a single parent, since her father abandoned her when he found out she was pregnant. Danna tells Gino that she won't go on selling drugs, but he threatens to hurt her family if turns him in and now she will have to do whatever he tells her to do. Among the options the gynecologist gives Fabiola is surrogacy, so she asks Mariluz to help her and will pay for her services. On the other hand, Carmen scolds Danna for getting together with Rita, who for her turned out to be a drug dealer with no values.
| 66 | "Una madre es capaz de todo por sus hijos" | 11 October 2021 | 19 January 2022 | 3.5 | TBA |
Rita's parents complain to Danna for getting their daughter into drugs and although she denies it, she is unable to say who was distributing the drugs to them. Alonso asks Mauro about his friendship with Priscila and although he tells him that their relationship is merely work related, he tries to find out more to inform Lisandro. Mariluz's nephew worsens to the point that they have to take him to a hospital but they don't have the resources to treat him, so she will have to pay for a private hospital. Renata invites Griselda to meet her parents but she drinks too much and begins to contradict herself about the version that her cousin is dead.
| 67 | "Tomar una dura decisión" | 12 October 2021 | 20 January 2022 | 3.8 | TBA |
Danna confesses to Ulises and Oliver why she was expelled from school and Oliver wants to tell his father. Renata wants to convince her aunt to take some tests. Mauro assures that his relationship with Fabiola is occasional and Javier asks him to break up with her so he won't hurt her. Lisandro continues to threaten Brenda. Javier continues to interrogate Brenda about her origin. Lisandro makes Renata a proposal for her kit. Carmen and Danna report Gino.
| 68 | "Cargar con odio" | 13 October 2021 | 21 January 2022 | 3.8 | 1.50 |
Priscila wants to take Rodrigo to Boston so that he can be operated on and walk again. Renata confronts Lisandro. Brenda proposes to Renata to go with Javier and her to start a new life. Fabiola and Mariluz visit the gynecologist to find out everything for Mariluz's pregnancy. Lisandro learns that Priscila was Arturo's wife. Gemma contacts Priscila, but Darío confesses the truth to Rodrigo. Danna sets a trap for Gino. Mariluz signs the contract.
| 69 | "Tomar el control de la situación" | 14 October 2021 | 24 January 2022 | 3.3 | 1.94 |
Darío decides to confess the whole truth to Rodrigo and Rodrigo rejects him for hiding everything. Danna is manipulated by Gino and sees him outside her house. Carmen advises Ulises about Mariluz. Darío remembers what happened in the past with Priscila and Rodrigo demands to talk to Priscila. Gino tries to take Danna away but Mariluz and Renata arrive to stop him. Mauro's true identity is exposed by Lisandro. Rodrigo demands to see Priscila to clarify her abandonment.
| 70 | "Un golpe inesperado" | 15 October 2021 | 25 January 2022 | 3.4 | 1.77 |
Mauro's true identity is exposed by Lisandro and ends up threatening him along with Priscila. Lisandro threatens Darío with jail and fires him out of Biogenelab. Fabiola confronts Darío for lying to her and slaps him. Renata sets a trap for Nieves and Griselda. Brenda makes a revelation to Javier. Renata confesses to Mauro that she loves him.
| 71 | "La vida puede terminar en cualquier momento" | 18 October 2021 | 26 January 2022 | 3.9 | 1.67 |
Renata reveals her feelings to Mauro, who tells her that he cannot reciprocate. Brenda is willing to help Javier to unmask Lisandro. Oliver arrives in time to prevent Vanessa from being hurt. Renata puts a stop to Alonso about her kit. Priscila confesses to Dario that she still has feelings for him. Javier has something very important to tell Renata, but he is hit by a car.
| 72 | "Ninguna culpa se olvida" | 19 October 2021 | 27 January 2022 | 4.0 | 1.97 |
Renata suffers for Javier's health. Brenda is very worried about her son. Priscila tries to kiss Darío. Carmen gets Galax to want to see her. Darío is tormented by the argument with his father. Brenda offers an apology to her son for not believing him when Lisandro took him away from her. Javier's health is critical and Brenda confronts Lisandro for everything he did to Javier. Javier dies in front of Renata and she feels guilty because she had decided to break up with him. Fabiola consoles herself in Erick’s arms. Darío decides to look for Renata to support her and make a confession.
| 73 | "Fake news" | 20 October 2021 | 28 January 2022 | 4.3 | 1.60 |
Fabiola tells Erick not to get his hopes up because it was only sex and forbids him to say anything, he swears to keep the secret. Brenda receives Carmen's support. Darío opens his heart to Renata and Renata asks him to stay away for a while. Erick keeps thinking about Fabiola. Carmen and Lucio go on a picnic with their children. Renata is attacked on social media after Javier's death, Alonso confronts her. Rodrigo makes the decision to leave with Priscila. Carmen ends up arrested for trying to catch Gino.
| 74 | "Una imagen vale más que mil palabras" | 21 October 2021 | 31 January 2022 | 4.4 | 1.77 |
Carmen sees Gino trying to sell drugs and confronts him, but the police arrive and arrest both of them. Oliver and Fede get in trouble for Vanessa's photos. Renata resigns from Biogenelab, but Lisandro makes her a counteroffer. Brenda demands the company's financial statements. Priscila is happy with Rodrigo's decision. Carmen is released. Carmen is attacked on social media and nicknamed #LadyNarcoFresa. Lisandro takes revenge against Darío. Eusebio is attacked by Isidro.
| 75 | "Verdades que no hay manera de ocultar" | 22 October 2021 | 1 February 2022 | 3.9 | 1.78 |
Lisandro complains to Darío for going through Javier's belongings. Rodrigo and Darío find Eusebio beaten. Lisandro asks Alonso to punch him in the face in order to set a trap for Darío. Brenda does not believe that Darío hurt Lisandro. Vanessa accuses all her classmates, but defends Oliver. Fede seeks revenge and Juanpa helps Oliver. Sonia learns about Renata's origin. Alonso discovers Lisandro's secret.
| 76 | "Cuando dos vidas se cruzan" | 25 October 2021 | 3 February 2022 | 3.9 | 1.69 |
Alonso suspects that Lisandro was the one who ordered for Javier to be run over. Heriberto wants to get his family back no matter what, but Carmen makes it clear that she will not let him take her children. Fabiola complains to Mariluz for her indiscretion with Renata and she refuses to sell her kit to Lisandro. Gemma and Rodrigo dedicate words to each other before he leaves and make love. Alonso plans to enter Fabiola's life. Renata and Darío discover a secret from the past that unites them.
| 77 | "Las consecuencias del presente" | 26 October 2021 | 4 February 2022 | 4.1 | 1.84 |
Renata suggests that Darío take a DNA test, but he refuses. Lucio discovers a secret from Carmen's past. Darío refuses to take the DNA test because he does not believe his father is guilty. Ulises wants to know how Mariluz feels about her decision to rent her womb. Lisandro mistreats Brenda and Isidro defends her. Ulises confesses to Mariluz that he can't stop thinking about her and they kiss. Darío is willing to be a donor for Renata and agrees to take the test.
| 78 | "El precio que pagamos" | 27 October 2021 | 7 February 2022 | 4.4 | 1.91 |
Darío agrees to take the DNA test in order to help Renata. Heriberto manages to take Oliver to Puebla. Brenda arrives at Biogenelab to take up her position in the laboratory. Darío is still unable to get a job. Fabiola explodes against Brenda when she finds out that she helped Darío denounce her father. Rodrigo thanks Eusebio, Gemma and Darío for all the support they have given him.
| 79 | "Evadir nuestra realidad" | 28 October 2021 | 8 February 2022 | 4.2 | 1.84 |
Renata confirms that she and Darío are not related. Eusebio tells Renata that Darío is in custody. Lisandro demands that Darío stop his desire for justice or Rodrigo and Renata will pay. Alonso continues to court Fabiola. Danna tells Carmen that she wants to move in with Heriberto. Mariluz and Ulises make love and are surprised by Fabiola. Renata sends a powerful message to find her mother.
| 80 | "El lazo que nos une" | 29 October 2021 | 9 February 2022 | 3.8 | 1.72 |
Lisandro tells Renata that her cry for help is pathetic, to which she replies that she is trying to save her life and he should not get involved in that. Carmen and Danna spend the night at Lucio's house but he gets a message from Carolina. Carmen sees the message and saves the number to look for her. Gemma shows Sister Caridad the video that Renata posted but is shocked to realize that she is the one Renata is looking for.
| 81 | "El llamado de la sangre" | 1 November 2021 | 10 February 2022 | 3.2 | 1.70 |
Renata learns that Caridad is her mother. Carolina loses control and tries to hurt her children and Carmen, but Lucio arrives to stop her. Caridad confesses the whole truth to Renata about her terrible past, but Renata becomes ill and is rushed to the hospital. Lucio gets upset with Carmen for putting his children in danger. Darío confesses to Renata that he is in love with her and kisses her, she wakes up and hears his confession. Carmen is sad for Lucio. Brenda makes a revelation to Javier's father.
| 82 | "Enfrentar el pasado" | 2 November 2021 | 11 February 2022 | 3.8 | 1.61 |
Brenda calls Isidro and reveals to him that he is Javier's father and he is shocked by the news. Everyone suffers knowing that they must prepare for the worst, as Renata still can't get a donor. Darío asks Caridad to tell him who the man who attacked her is. Erik is sad about Renata's illness, Fabiola overhears him and the two end up kissing. Darío discovers that it was Griselda who denounced his father. Lisandro apologizes to Renata for inheriting Wilson's illness and confesses to her that he is her biological father.
| 83 | "El tiempo se acaba" | 3 November 2021 | 14 February 2022 | 4.1 | 1.86 |
Lisandro visits Renata in the hospital, gives her a paternity test and tells her his version of events. Darío discovers that Javier found out the truth and that is why he was killed. Alonso reports Isidro and is arrested for the murder of Javier Mascaró. Renata makes it clear to Lisandro that she despises him for having raped her mother and he ends up rejecting her. Renata has one last wish before she dies and asks Dario to help her fulfill it. Lisandro confesses to Fabiola that Renata is her half-sister. Alonso and Darío confront each other. Danna runs away from home.
| 84 | "Cobrar una vida a cambio de otra" | 4 November 2021 | 14 February 2022 | 4.7 | 1.86 |
Alonso becomes Lisandro's most loyal person. Lisandro threatens Darío with revenge against Rodrigo. Everyone worries that Renata's health is worsening. Lucio learns of Danna's disappearance and helps to find her. Fabiola confronts Lisandro about his lies and crimes. Fabiola decides to be Renata's donor and save her life. Lisandro orders Alonso to kill Darío and kidnap Mariluz.
| 85 | "Renacer" | 5 November 2021 | 15 February 2022 | 4.4 | 2.06 |
Alonso summons all his courage and ends up shooting Lisandro. They both end up in jail and pay their sentence for their crimes along with Isidro. Renata's transplant is a success. Heriberto makes up with Carmen and signs the divorce. Darío is happy to have Renata by his side and to be able to celebrate her life. Erik finishes paying off his debt to Minerva. Darío learns that Rodrigo is his son. Renata asks Lisandro to repent for his sins but he does not and dies. Fabiola and Renata visit their father's grave. Renata finishes her kit with the support of Brenda and Fabiola. Eusebio applauds Darío and Rodrigo's affection for each other and comes out of the closet. Mariluz gets her father to forgive her. Lucio decides to be Carmen's neighbor. Fabiola hides her relationship with Erik. Renata and Darío make love. Carmen, Mariluz, Danna and Renata manage to leave adversity behind, face their present and overcome the past.

== Reception ==
=== Ratings ===
Viewership and ratings per season of Vencer el pasado
| Season | Timeslot (CT) | Episodes | First aired | | Last aired | | Avg. viewers (millions) |
| Season | Timeslot (CT) | Episodes | Date | Viewers (millions) | Date | Viewers (millions) | Avg. viewers (millions) |
|---|---|---|---|---|---|---|---|
| 1 | Mon–Fri 8:30 p.m. | 85 | 12 July 2021 | 3.3 | 5 November 2021 | 4.4 | 3.65 |

=== Awards and nominations ===
| Year | Award | Category | Recipient | Results | Ref. |
|---|---|---|---|---|---|
| 2022 | Premios Juventud | My Favorite Actor | Sebastián Rulli | Won | |
| 2022 | Premios Juventud | My Favorite Actress | Angelique Boyer | Nominated | |
| 2022 | Premios Juventud | Best On-Screen Couple | Angelique Boyer & Sebastián Rulli | Won | |
