= Lo que la vida me robó =

Mexican telenovela

- Genre: Telenovela
- Developed by: Juan Carlos Alcalá
- Written by: Rosa Salazar Arenas; Fermín Zúñiga; Jorge Cervantes
- Story by: Caridad Bravo Adams; María Zarattini
- Directed by: Claudio Reyes Rubio; Sergio Cataño
- Creative directors: Manuel Barajas; Armando Zafra
- Starring: Daniela Castro; Angelique Boyer; Sebastián Rulli; Luis Roberto Guzmán; Sergio Sendel; Rogelio Guerra; Don Eric del Castillo; Grettell Valdez; Alberto Estrella; Ana Bertha Espín; Juan Carlos Barreto; Gabriela Rivero
- Theme music composer: Enrique Iglesias
- Opening theme: "El perdedor" by Enrique Iglesias and Marco Antonio Solís
- Ending theme: "Corazones invencibles" by Aleks Syntek
- Country of origin: Mexico
- Original language: Spanish
- No. of episodes: 197

Production
- Executive producer: Angelli Nesma Medina
- Producer: Juan Ignacio Alarcón
- Production locations: Campeche, Mexico; Agua Azul, Chiapas; Quintana Roo
- Camera setup: Multi-camera

Original release
- Network: Canal de las Estrellas
- Release: October 28, 2013 – July 27, 2014

Related
- Bodas de odio; Amor real

Lo que la vida me robó (English title: What Life Took From Me) is a Mexican telenovela produced by Angelli Nesma Medina for Televisa, broadcast by Canal de las Estrellas (now known simply as Las Estrellas). The series originally aired from October 28, 2013, to July 27, 2014. It is an adaptation of the 1983 telenovela Bodas de odio produced by Ernesto Alonso, which also inspired Amor real, produced by Carla Estrada in 2003.

The series stars Daniela Castro, Angelique Boyer, Sebastián Rulli, Luis Roberto Guzmán, Sergio Sendel, Rogelio Guerra, Don Eric del Castillo, Grettell Valdez, Alberto Estrella, Ana Bertha Espín, Juan Carlos Barreto, and Gabriela Rivero.

The telenovela tells the story of Montserrat, whom her mother has chosen to be the solution of the family's economic problems, forcing her to marry a wealthy young man.

Univision aired Lo que la vida me robó on November 18, 2013 weeknights at 9pm/8c replacing La Tempestad. The last episode was broadcast on August 15, 2014 with Hasta el fin del mundo replacing it on August 18, 2014.

== Plot ==
This story unfolds in Aguazul, a picturesque town where Montserrat (Angelique Boyer), a beautiful young woman from a privileged background, lives, leading her to dream of a perfect life. Montserrat is constantly manipulated by her mother, Graciela Giacinti (Daniela Castro), whose only concern is social appearances and who, therefore, is unwilling to relinquish her social status, even though her husband, Lauro Mendoza (Rogelio Guerra), a retired admiral, has lost everything.

Montserrat has become the solution to her family's socioeconomic problems, as her mother has chosen the ideal husband for her: Sebastián de Icaza (Osvaldo de León), the son of one of Aguazul's most influential families. However, she is unwilling to marry a man chosen for convenience, especially since she is actually in love with someone else: José Luis (Luis Roberto Guzmán), a corporal in the navy. Her parents are unaware of this romance, and this worries Montserrat.

José Luis, for his part, feels that his relationship with Montserrat is going nowhere, since deep down he knows that the Mendoza family will never accept him because he has no promising future to share with Montserrat.

Meanwhile, Alejandro (Sebastián Rulli), a hardworking young farmhand on a nearby ranch with aspirations for a better life, learns a truth: his father is Don Benjamín Almonte (Alfredo Adame), a cruel, powerful, and wealthy man who revealed this secret to his son on his deathbed. Alejandro doesn't take this news well, and at the same time as this shocking event unfolds, life intervenes when he meets Montserrat, with whom he is immediately captivated.

Montserrat decides to break off her engagement to Sebastián; her mother, Graciela, becomes furious, as she saw this marriage as the only way to settle their debts. Graciela refuses to give up and begins searching for another suitor for her daughter. She learns that a farmhand named Alejandro is the heir to Don Benjamín, making him the ideal suitor for Montserrat, as he could ensure the continuation of the status and privileges they have enjoyed.

In her desperation, Graciela openly asks Alejandro for financial assistance. He agrees to support the Mendoza family on the sole condition that he be allowed to court her daughter, Montserrat. Graciela doesn't hesitate for a moment and accepts the proposal, making Alejandro swear that Montserrat must not find out about the arrangement.

Meanwhile, Montserrat and José Luis are discovered in their relationship by Graciela and her ambitious son, Dimitrio (Osvaldo Benavides), who, unwilling to jeopardize their promising future, set about separating them.

They quickly achieve their goal, causing Montserrat to change her perception of José Luis when the authorities frame him for a murder he didn't commit, leading to his arrest and imprisonment.

But the situation becomes complicated when Graciela notices that Montserrat doesn't want to get romantically involved with Alejandro; therefore, she is forced to confess the truth about their financial situation to her daughter. Despite her principles and knowing that it's the only way to help her family avoid complete ruin, Montserrat agrees to marry Alejandro, just as José Luis reappears to reveal the truth about the injustice he suffered and to show her that he truly loves her.

It's too late, though, because Montserrat is now Alejandro Almonte's wife.

== Cast ==
=== Main ===
- Daniela Castro as Graciela Giacinti de Mendoza
- Angelique Boyer as Montserrat Mendoza
- Sebastián Rulli as Alejandro Almonte
- Luis Roberto Guzmán as José Luis Álvarez
- Sergio Sendel as Pedro Medina
- Rogelio Guerra as Lauro Mendoza
- Don Eric del Castillo as Father Anselmo
- Grettell Valdez as María Zamudio
- Alberto Estrella as Juventino Zamudio
- Ana Bertha Espín as Rosario Domínguez
- Juan Carlos Barreto as Macario
- Gabriela Rivero as Carlota Mendoza

=== Recurring and guest stars ===
- Luis Uribe as Captain Robledo
- Osvaldo Benavides as Dimitrio Mendoza
- Verónica Jaspeado as Josefina Valverde
- Margarita Magaña as Esmeralda Ramos
- Carlos de la Mota as Refugio Solares
- Alejandro Ávila as Víctor Hernández
- Ale García as Nadia Argüelles de Medina
- Lisset as Fabiola Guillén
- Francisco Gattorno as Sandro Narváez
- Otto Sirgo as Regino
- Alejandro Sirvent as Erick
- Ferdinando Valencia as Adolfo Argüelles
- Marco Uriel as Efraín Loreto
- Isabella Camil as Amelia Bertrand de Aréchiga
- Luis Xavier as Joaquín Aréchiga
- Ilithya Manzanilla as Angélica Aréchiga
- Natalia Juárez as Virginia Aréchiga
- Jessica Mas as Mónica Rentería
- Alejandra Procuna as Dominga García
- Luis Gatica as Bruno Gamboa
- Rafael Amador as Lieutenant Avellaneda
- Juan Romanca as Gaspar Zamudio
- Ricardo Kleinbaum as Samuel Barajas
- Ricardo Vera as Lawyer Cervera
- Iván Caraza as Tomás Valverde
- Osvaldo de León as Sebastián de Icaza
- Alfredo Adame as Benjamín Almonte
- Patricia Conde as Prudencia Robledo
- Ana Paula Martínez as Victoria
- Óscar Daniel Duarte as Laurito
- Santiago Hernández as Kevin
- Alexis Ayala as Ezequiel Basurto

== Production ==
=== Filming ===
The filming of the telenovela officially began on August 2, 2013, in the state of Campeche, Mexico. The first actors confirmed apart from Angelique Boyer and Sebastián Rulli were Grettell Valdez, Osvaldo Benavides and Alexis Ayala, who played the roles of the antagonists, among others.

Several episodes of the telenovela were filmed outdoors and at the Uayamón Hacienda in Campeche, where temperatures exceeded 30 °C. Because the production team decided to extend the number of episodes, filming often lasted more than 16 hours a day. Some weeks after filming began, production was suspended due to the bad weather.

Several photos were posted on Twitter; some were taken on the beaches of Yucatán and historic sites like Telchac Puerto, Celestún and Mérida.

== Ratings ==
Viewership and ratings per season of Lo que la vida me robó
Season	Timeslot (CT)	Episodes	First aired		Last aired		Avg. viewers (millions)
Season	Timeslot (CT)	Episodes	Date	Viewers (millions)	Date	Viewers (millions)	Avg. viewers (millions)
1	Mon–Fri 9:20 pm	197	October 28, 2013	20.0	July 27, 2014	30.9	TBD

== Soundtrack ==
Track	Song	Singer(s)	Running time	References
1	"El perdedor"	Enrique Iglesias and Marco Antonio Solís	4:22	
2	"Corazones invencibles"	Aleks Syntek	4:22	
3	"Vuelvo a nacer"	Alex Sirvent and Andrea Parmeggiani	4:25	
4	"Volver a amar"	Alex Sirvent	—N/a	
5	"Lo que siento por ti"	Carlos de la Mota	4:20	
6	"Cruzaré mil mares"	Alex Sirvent	3:54	
7	"Mujer prohibida"	Alejandro Ávila	—N/a	
8	"Este amor es muy grande"	Banda Los Sebastianes	3:24	
9	"Aún"	Jaime Flores and Magda Castelo	4:13	
10	"Volvería a mentir"	Evelyn de la Luz	4:33	
11	"Mi mejor amigo"	Mafer	—N/a	
12	"No puedo amarte"	—N/a	3:46	
13	"Amores de cristal"	Luja	3:47	
14	"Gracias"	Jorge Daher	—N/a	
15	"Gracias"	Alex Sirvent	3:53	
16	"Frío"	Alex Sirvent	3:11	
17	"Chica Loka"	La Klave	3:40	

== Awards and nominations ==
Year	Association	Category	Nominee(s)	Result
2013	TV Adicto Golden Awards	Best Set Design and Props	Lo que la vida me robó	Won
2013	TV Adicto Golden Awards	Special Award for Excellence to an Actress	Daniela Castro	Won
2013	TV Adicto Golden Awards	Best Leading Actor	Rogelio Guerra	Won
2014	Juventud Awards	Girl of my Dreams	Angelique Boyer	Won
2014	Juventud Awards	What a Hottie!	Sebastián Rulli	Nominated
2014	Juventud Awards	Best Telenovela Theme	"El perdedor" by Enrique Iglesias and Marco Antonio Solís	Won
2014	People en Español Awards	Best Telenovela	Lo que la vida me robó	Won
2014	People en Español Awards	Best Actress	Angelique Boyer	Nominated
2014	People en Español Awards	Heartthrob of the Year	Sebastián Rulli	Won
2014	People en Español Awards	The Meanest Bad Girl	Daniela Castro	Nominated
2014	People en Español Awards	The Meanest Bad Guy	Sergio Sendel	Won
2014	People en Español Awards	Best On-Screen Chemistry	Angelique Boyer; Sebastián Rulli	Won
2015	TVyNovelas Awards	Best Telenovela	Angelli Nesma Medina	Nominated
2015	TVyNovelas Awards	Best Actress	Angelique Boyer	Nominated
2015	TVyNovelas Awards	Best Actor	Sebastián Rulli	Won
2015	TVyNovelas Awards	Best Antagonist Actress	Daniela Castro	Won
2015	TVyNovelas Awards	Best Antagonist Actor	Alexis Ayala	Nominated
2015	TVyNovelas Awards	Best Antagonist Actor	Sergio Sendel	Nominated
2015	TVyNovelas Awards	Best Leading Actress	Ana Bertha Espín	Nominated
2015	TVyNovelas Awards	Best Co-lead Actor	Luis Roberto Guzmán	Won
2015	TVyNovelas Awards	Best Supporting Actress	Margarita Magaña	Nominated
2015	TVyNovelas Awards	Best Supporting Actor	Osvaldo Benavides	Won
2015	TVyNovelas Awards	Best Musical Theme	"El perdedor" by Enrique Iglesias and Marco Antonio Solís	Nominated
2015	TVyNovelas Awards	Best Original Story or Adaptation	Juan Carlos Alcalá; Rosa Salazar; Fermín Zúñiga	Won
2015	TVyNovelas Awards	Best Cast	Angelli Nesma Medina	Nominated
2015	TVyNovelas Awards (Audience's Favorites)	Favorite Finale	Angelli Nesma Medina	Nominated
2015	TVyNovelas Awards (Audience's Favorites)	The Most Beautiful Woman	Angelique Boyer	Nominated
2015	TVyNovelas Awards (Audience's Favorites)	The Most Handsome Man	Sebastián Rulli	Nominated
2015	TVyNovelas Awards (Audience's Favorites)	Favorite Female Villain	Daniela Castro	Nominated
2015	TVyNovelas Awards (Audience's Favorites)	Favorite Male Villain	Alberto Estrella	Nominated
2015	TVyNovelas Awards (Audience's Favorites)	Favorite Male Villain	Alexis Ayala	Nominated
2015	TVyNovelas Awards (Audience's Favorites)	Favorite Male Villain	Sergio Sendel	Nominated
2015	TVyNovelas Awards (Audience's Favorites)	Favorite Slap	Daniela Castro; Angelique Boyer	Nominated
2015	TVyNovelas Awards (Audience's Favorites)	Favorite Kiss	Angelique Boyer; Luis Roberto Guzmán	Nominated
2015	TVyNovelas Awards (Audience's Favorites)	Favorite Kiss	Angelique Boyer; Sebastián Rulli	Nominated
2015	TVyNovelas Awards (Audience's Favorites)	Favorite Couple	Angelique Boyer; Sebastián Rulli	Nominated
