= Tres veces Ana =

Mexican telenovela

- Genre: Telenovela
- Created by: Juan Carlos Alcalá
- Written by: Rosa Salazar; Fermín Zuñiga; Graciela E. Izquierdo
- Story by: Jorge Lozano Soriano
- Starring: Angelique Boyer; Sebastián Rulli; David Zepeda; Susana Dosamantes; Blanca Guerra; Pedro Moreno; Eric del Castillo
- Theme music composer: Pablo Alborán
- Opening theme: "Se Puede Amar" by Pablo Alborán
- Country of origin: Mexico
- Original language: Spanish
- No. of episodes: 123

Production
- Executive producer: Angelli Nesma Medina
- Editor: Rossana Ruiz
- Camera setup: Multi-camera
- Production company: Televisa

Original release
- Network: Las Estrellas
- Release: May 23 – October 24, 2016

Related
- Lazos de amor

Tres veces Ana (The Three Sides of Ana) is a Mexican telenovela produced by Angelli Nesma Medina for Televisa. It is a remake of Lazos de amor produced in 1995. It premiered on May 23, 2016.

The series stars Angelique Boyer as Ana Lucía, Ana Laura and Ana Leticia, Sebastián Rulli as Santiago and Marcelo, David Zepeda as Ramiro, Susana Dosamantes as Ernestina, Blanca Guerra as Soledad, Pedro Moreno as Iñaki, and Eric del Castillo as Evaristo.

== Plot ==
Ana Lucía, Ana Leticia, and Ana Laura Alvarez Del Castillo are identical triplets with very different personalities. The story starts twenty years ago when Ana Leticia unintentionally caused the death of their parents in a car accident when she grabbed the steering wheel from her father due to a tantrum fit. It was believed that Ana Lucía had drowned in the river in which the family car fell and only Ana Leticia and Ana Laura survived. Local woman, Soledad Hernández, who was suffering from the loss of her young daughter, finds Ana Lucía in the river and raises her as her own. Ana Lucia grows up knowing nothing about her true origins. She was raised as a headstrong but compassionate woman who loves her friends and family, especially her mother.

Meanwhile, Ana Laura is a sweet but quiet and lonely girl who wants to find her missing sister, refusing to believe she is dead. She lost a leg in the car accident which gave her an inferiority complex. She falls in love with Ramiro, who also loves her, but she doesn't feel worthy of his love and thinks he just feels sorry for her due to her disability. Growing up with Ana Laura in the mansion is Ana Leticia. It seems Ana Leticia was the only one that was unharmed in the accident but actually she is paranoid all her life due to her secret (her involvement in the accident years ago). Unlike Ana Laura, Ana Leticia is a narcissist. She is glamorous, selfish, and manipulative, always needing to be the center of attention, especially with her grandmother, Ernestina (who also believes Ana Lucía is alive), and her adopted uncle, Mariano (with whom Ana Leticia is secretly in love with), the twins' guardians.

Ana Leticia is allied with Iñaki who becomes her accomplice to her evil plots and deceits. In San Nicolas, Ana Lucía meets Santiago Garcia; his real name is actually Marcelo Salvaterra, but he had an accident caused by his nemesis, Evaristo Guerra on orders of Ana Leticia, his wife three years prior, and as a result, has no memory of his true identity or past and is presumed dead. Given a home by Remedios, Santiago leads an ordinary life as a taxi driver and has dreams of Ana Leticia, but her face is blurred. Soledad doesn't want Ana Lucía close to Santiago, due to Marcelo having threatened her before the accident, and they separate. Lucía and Soledad come to Mexico City, where they meet Remedios and unexpectedly cross paths with Santiago. Ramiro, Marcelo's best friend, finds him and Ana Lucía. Remedios discovers Soledad's secret but remains quiet. Blood ties will eventually join the sisters, interweaving their lives in an unexpected way, bringing back together what was once separated.

== Cast ==
=== Main ===
- Angelique Boyer as Ana Lucía / Ana Laura / Ana Leticia Alvarez del Castillo
- Sebastián Rulli as Santiago García / Marcelo Salvaterra
- David Zepeda as Ramiro Fuentes
- Susana Dosamantes as Ernestina Rivadeneira
- Blanca Guerra as Soledad Hernández
- Pedro Moreno as Iñaki Nájera
- Eric del Castillo as Evaristo Guerra

=== Recurring ===
- Ana Bertha Espín as Remedios García
- Luz María Jerez as Julieta
- Leticia Perdigón as Doña Chana
- Nuria Bages as Leonor
- Mónika Sánchez as Viridiana
- Otto Sirgo as Rodrigo Casasola
- Carlos de la Mota as Valentín
- Antonio Medellín as Isidro
- Roberto Ballesteros as Tadeo
- Sachi Tamashiro as Maribel
- Alfredo Gatica as Orlando
- Juliana Teresa as Isabella Cabañas
- Alan Slim as Javier
- Arsenio Campos as Sandro
- Rolando Brito as Edmundo Fuentes
- Fabían Pizzorno as Facundo
- Raúl Magaña as Ignacio
- Ricardo Barona as Alfredo
- Jackie Sauza as Lourdes Rivadeneira de Álvarez del Castillo
- Nataly Umaña as Gina
- Vanessa Angers as Valeria
- Maru Dueñas as Cecilia
- Adriana Ahumada as Susy
- Archie Lanfranco as Samuel
- Ricardo Kleinbaum as Aníbal
- José Montini as El Curvas
- Ramiro Fumazoni as Mariano

=== Guest ===
- Olivia Bucio as Nerina
- Laisha Wilkins as Jennifer
- Nicolás Mena as Cristian
- Alfonso Iturralde as Bernardo
- Eddy Vilard as Daniel
- Lucero Lander as Miranda
- Essined Aponte as Adriana

== Production ==
Production on the telenovela began on January 4, 2016 in Mexico City. Alex Sirvent was confirmed to perform the theme songs of the telenovela. During the casting process and pre-production, the telenovela's working title was "Como tres gotas de agua".

On December 22, 2015 Angelique Boyer confirmed through her Twitter account that the ultimate title of the telenovela was Frente al mismo rostro. In March 2016, the title was changed again, becoming Tres veces Ana.

== Awards and nominations ==
Year	Award	Category	Nominated	Result
2017	35th TVyNovelas Awards	Best Actress	Angelique Boyer	Won
2017	35th TVyNovelas Awards	Best Actor	Sebastián Rulli	Won
2017	35th TVyNovelas Awards	Best Leading Actress	Blanca Guerra	Nominated
2017	35th TVyNovelas Awards	Best Leading Actor	Eric del Castillo	Nominated
2017	35th TVyNovelas Awards	Best Supporting Actress	Laisha Wilkins	Nominated
2017	35th TVyNovelas Awards	Best Supporting Actor	Otto Sirgo	Nominated
2017	35th TVyNovelas Awards	Best Young Lead Actress	Sachi Tamashiro	Nominated
2017	35th TVyNovelas Awards	Best Direction	Claudio Reyes Rubio and Sergio Cataño	Nominated
2017	35th TVyNovelas Awards	Best Direction of the Camaras	Manuel Barajas and Armando Zafra	Nominated
2017	35th TVyNovelas Awards	Best Musical Theme	"Se puede amar" (Pablo Alborán)	Won
2017	35th TVyNovelas Awards	Best Cast	Tres veces Ana	Nominated
