= Sebastián Rulli =

Argentine-Mexican actor (born 1966)

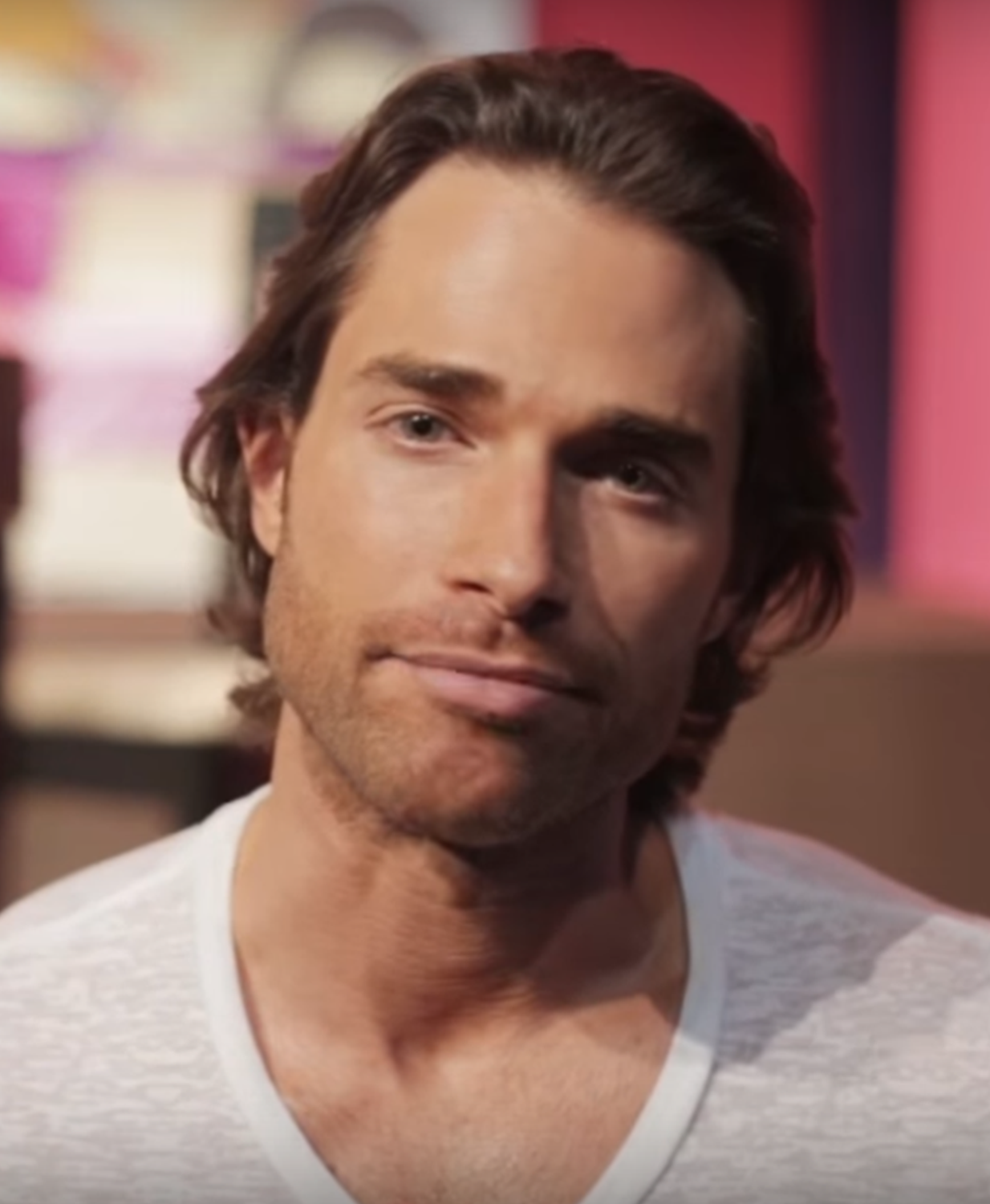
- Rulli in 2016
- Born: Sebastián Oscar Rulli; 6 July 1975 (age 51); Buenos Aires, Argentina
- Citizenship: Argentina; Mexico
- Occupation: Actor
- Years active: 1995−present
- Spouse: Cecilia Galliano (m. 2008; div. 2011)
- Partner(s): Angelique Boyer (2014–present)
- Children: 1

Sebastián Oscar Rulli (pronounced [seβasˈtian ˈoskaɾ ˈruli], born 6 July 1975) is an Argentine-Mexican actor and model. Born in Argentina, he has spent most of his professional career in Mexico, becoming a dual Argentine and Mexican citizen.

== Biography ==
Rulli was born in Buenos Aires, the oldest of three children. He studied Business Administration in his native Argentina; however, after completing his studies, he decided to travel to Europe and try his luck in the world of modeling. When moving to Mexico, he entered the Centro de Educación Artística, where he received further training as an actor, although he had already taken acting classes with several teachers in Argentina, Spain and Italy.

== Career ==
Between 1995 and 1998 the actor began to venture into some telenovelas in Argentina, and later decided to settle in Mexico to study acting at the Centro de Educación Artística de Televisa. His debut on screen was in the year 2000 in the telenovela Primer amor, a mil por hora, followed by Sin pecado concebido, and Clase 406, both melodramas began to position him as one of the most sought after actors. In 2004, the actor starred in the telenovela Rubí, alongside actress Bárbara Mori, a role that would catapult him to international success.

During the following years, Rulli continued working uninterruptedly in telenovelas such as Contra viento y marea, Mundo de fieras, and Pasión. In addition to telenovelas, Rulli has participated in TV series as Mujer, casos de la vida real, Alegrijes y rebujos, Ugly Betty, and Amor mío. In 2008 he starred in the telenovela Un gancho al corazón based on the Argentine telenovela titled Sos mi vida, with Danna García.

The following year he appeared in two episodes of the telenovela Cuando me enamoro, and he starred the telenovela Teresa, with Angelique Boyer, thanks to his performance in this telenovela he received two awards as Best Actor in the New York Latin ACE Awards and the Bravo Awards.

In 2012 he was the co-star of the telenovela produced by Nicandro Díaz González entitled Amores verdaderos, an adaptation of the Argentine telenovela produced in 2005 entitled Amor en custodia. Two years after Teresa, he returned to work with Angelique Boyer, in the telenovela Lo que la vida me robó. This telenovela made him win as Best Lead Actor at the 33rd TVyNovelas Awards. Two years later, he returned to star along with Boyer the telenovela Tres veces Ana, which made him return to win in TVyNovelas Awards as Best Actor.

In 2019, Rulli appeared naked showing his buttocks in photos on the beach. Garbage on the beach could also appear in the images. In this way he tried to raise awareness among his followers about environmental pollution.

In April 2022, he was rumored to star in the James Bond franchise, as the titular character.

== Personal life ==
Rulli was married to Cecilia Galliano from 2008 to 2011, and with her he had his first child, Santiago. He has been in a relationship with actress Angelique Boyer since 2014.

== Filmography ==
=== Film ===
Year	Title	Role	Notes
2005	Tres	Virgilio	
2016	Dos policías en apuros	John Torres	

=== Television ===
Year	Title	Role	Notes
1995	Montaña rusa, otra vuelta	Ignacio	Television debut
1997	Locas por ellos	Jhonny	
1997	Naranja y media	Sebastián	
1998	Verano del '98	Willy	5 episodes
2000	Primer amor, a mil por hora	Mauricio	
2001	Primer amor, tres años después	Mauricio	Television film
2001	Sin pecado concebido	Marco Vinicio Martorel Hernández	
2001–2005	Mujer, Casos de la Vida Real		Various roles
2002–2003	Clase 406	Juan Esteban San Pedro	
2004	Rubí	Héctor Ferrer Garza	
2004	Rubí, la descarada	Héctor Ferrer Garza (archive footage)	Lead role
2004	Alegrijes y rebujos	Rogelio Díaz Mercado	2 episodes
2005	Contra viento y marea	Sebastián Cárdenas Contreras	Lead role
2006	Ugly Betty	Padre Pedro / Handsome Guy	Uncredited; 4 episodes
2006–2007	Mundo de fieras	Juan Cristóbal Martínez Guerra	
2006	Amor mío	Juan Cristóbal	Archive footage; 1 episode
2007–2008	Pasión	Santiago Márquez	
2008–2009	Un gancho al corazón	Mauricio Sermeño	Lead role
2010	Cuando me enamoro	Roberto Gamba	2 episodes
2010–2011	Teresa	Arturo de la Barrera Azuela	Lead role
2012–2013	Amores verdaderos	Francisco "Frank" Guzmán	Co-lead role 182 episodes
2013–2014	Lo que la vida me robó	Alejandro Almonte Domínguez	Lead role
2016–2017	Tres veces Ana	Santiago García / Marcelo Salvaterra	Lead role
2017–2018	Papá a toda madre	Mauricio López-Garza Silvetti	Lead role
2019–2020	El Dragón: Return of a Warrior	Miguel Garza Martínez "El Dragón"	Lead role
2021	Vencer el pasado	Mauro Álvarez Llanos / Dario Valencia Grimaldi	Lead role
2022	Los ricos también lloran	Luis Alberto Salvatierra Suárez	Lead role
2023	Más allá de ti	David Salgado	Lead role
2024–2025	El extraño retorno de Diana Salazar	Mario Villarreal / Eduardo de Carvajal	Lead role
2026	Mi rival	Renato	Lead role

== Awards and nominations ==
=== TVyNovelas Awards ===
Year	Category	Nominated works	Result	Ref.
2008	Best Lead Actor	Pasión	Nominated	
2010	Best Lead Actor	Un gancho al corazón	Nominated	
2011	Best Lead Actor	Teresa	Nominated	
2014	Best Lead Actor	Amores verdaderos	Nominated	
2015	Best Lead Actor	Lo que la vida me robó	Won	
2017	Best Lead Actor	Tres veces Ana	Won	
2018	Best Lead Actor	Papá a toda madre	Won	
Favoritos del público
2014	The Most Handsome	Amores verdaderos	Nominated	
2015	The Most Handsome	Lo que la vida me robó	Nominated	
2015	Favorite Couple (with Angelique Boyer)	Lo que la vida me robó	Nominated	
2015	Favorite Kiss (with Angelique Boyer)	Lo que la vida me robó	Nominated	

=== New York Latin ACE Awards ===
Year	Category	Nominated works	Result	Ref.
2010	Best Actor	Un gancho al corazón	Won	
2012	Best Actor	Teresa	Won	

=== Premios Juventud ===
Year	Category	Nominated works	Result	Ref.
2013	What a Hottie!	Amores verdaderos	Won	
2014	What a Hottie!	Lo que la vida me robó	Nominated	
2022	My Favorite Actor	Vencer el pasado	Won	
2022	Best On-Screen Couple (with Angelique Boyer)	Vencer el pasado	Won	
2025	My Favorite Actor	El extraño retorno de Diana Salazar	Won	
2025	They Make Me Fall in Love (with Angelique Boyer)	El extraño retorno de Diana Salazar	Won	

=== Premios Bravo ===
Year	Category	Nominated works	Result	Ref.
2010	Best Actor	Teresa	Won	

=== People en Español ===
Year	Category	Nominated works	Result	Ref.
2014	Best Actor	Lo que la vida me robó	Won	
2014	Best on-screen chemistry ( with Angelique Boyer)	Lo que la vida me robó	Won	
