= Angelique Boyer =

Mexican actress (born 1988)

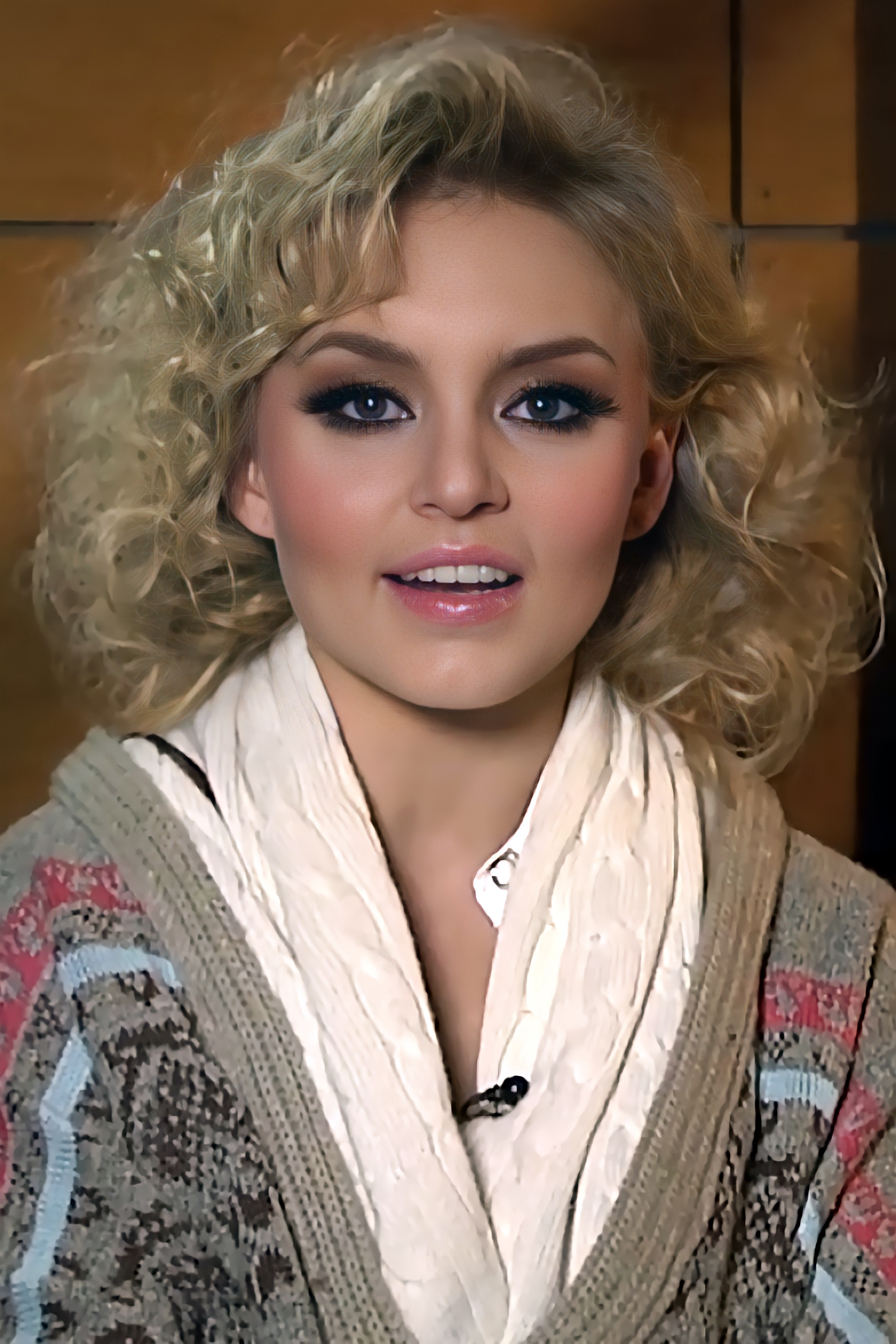
- Boyer in 2014
- Born: Angélique Monique-Paulette Boyer; 4 July 1988 (age 38); Saint-Claude, Jura, France
- Citizenship: France; Mexico
- Occupation: Actress
- Years active: 2004–present
- Partner: Sebastián Rulli (2014–present)

Angelique Monique-Paulette Boyer Rousseau (born 4 July 1988), simply known as Angelique Boyer, is a Mexican actress. Among her most notable works is her participation in soap operas such as Rebelde, and Teresa.

== Early life ==
Boyer was born in Saint-Claude, Jura, France. Boyer and her family moved to Mexico when she was two years old.

While filming Rebelde, she and two other co-stars – the actors who portray the characters of Celina (Estefanía Villareal) and José Luján (Zoraida Gómez) - formed the band Citricus or C3Q'S. After Rebelde, Boyer auditioned for Bailando por la Boda de mis Sueños (Dancing for my Dream Wedding).

=== Transition to mature roles ===
In 2009, she was cast in the high crime drama television series Mujeres Asesinas 2. These controversial roles marked a significant change in Boyer's acting career, for this was the first time fans had seen the actress in more mature roles.

Not long after she was the protagonist-antagonist in Teresa, she participated in a theatre role, Ausencia de Dios (God's Absence) she went from "la hembra mala" (femme fatale) to a "monja" (a nun in catholic religion), where she worked with Raquel Olmedo once again, and Jacqueline Andere.

In 2012, Boyer starred in the telenovela Abismo de pasión with David Zepeda.

On June 26, 2013, it was confirmed that Boyer (along with Sebastián Rulli and Luis Roberto Guzmán) would star in Angelli Nesma's Lo que la vida me robó, a remake of Ernesto Alonso's Bodas de odio produced in 1983. In late 2015, she was cast in Angelli Nesma Medina's telenovela Tres veces Ana.

== Career ==
=== 2004-2009 ===
She first appeared on television in the soap opera Corazones al límite, produced by Nicandro Díaz and Roberto Hernández Vázquez, playing the character "Anette", the best friend of the protagonist played by Sara Maldonado, before she moved to another city.

That same year, she participated in the soap opera Rebelde, a version of the Argentine soap opera Rebelde Way, and was produced by Pedro Damián. She was "Vico", a very liberal girl who had some boyfriends during the plot.

In 2007, she returned to television with the novel by Emilio Larrosa, Muchachitas como tú, based on Muchachitas, where she shared credits with Ariadne Díaz. In the plot she was "Margarita", engaged to the villain who also had the role of antagonist, until he was redeemed.

In 2008, she joined the soap opera Alma de Hierro, playing Sandra "Sandy" Hierro Jiménez, a girl who hid from her parents that she had the dream of being dancer, while they wanted the girl to study medicine.

In 2009, she participated in the second season of the television series Mujeres Asesinas, in the episode "Soledad Cautiva", playing Soledad Oropeza "Cindy" a girl who ends up getting involved with a man she met on the road, but what she didn't expect is that he would take her into the life of prostitution.

Later, in the same year, she participated in the novel produced by Salvador Mejía and created by Caridad Bravo Adams, Corazón salvaje. She was "Jimena", a gypsy who hid her condition from the noble "Gabriel", character of Sebastián Zurita.

=== 2010-2016 ===
In 2010, Boyer got her first starring role in the telenovela Teresa produced by José Alberto Castro. Boyer played protagonist Teresa Chávez Aguirre, alongside Aarón Díaz and Sebastián Rulli.

In 2012, she starred in the telenovela Abismo de Pasión, adapted from the 1996 soap opera Cañaveral de pasiones, and shared credits with David Zepeda.

In 2013, she was chosen by Angelli Nesma Medina to star in the telenovela Lo que la vida me robó, an adaptation of the novels Amor Real and Bodas de odio, starring alongside Sebastián Rulli and Luis Roberto Guzmán. She portrayed Montserrat, a socialite who was dominated by her mother Graziela.

In 2016, Boyer was selected by producer Angelli Nesma Medina to star in Tres veces Ana, an adaptation of Lazos de Amor, in which she starred alongside Sebastián Rulli, David Zepeda, and Pedro Moreno. She played three roles as the triplets Ana Lucía, Ana Laura, and Ana Letícia.

=== 2018-present ===
In 2018, Boyer appeared in Amar a muerte, starring alongside Michel Brown and Alexis Ayala.

In 2020, producer Giselle González chose Boyer to star in the soap opera Imperio de mentiras, a remake of the Turkish soap opera Kara Para Aşk. In this series she shared credits with Andrés Palacios, Leticia Calderón, Susana González and Alejandro Camacho. She played Elisa Cantú, a woman trying to solve the mystery of her father's death.

In 2021, she was chosen by the production company Rosy Ocampo to star in Vencer el pasado, playing molecular biologist Renata who is in a love triangle with Sebastián Rulli and Horacio Pancheri.

== Musical career ==
=== Green Rabanitos ===
In 2001, she belonged to the Rabanitos Verdes group, along with five boys. The band sang the opening theme of the children's telenovela María Belén.

=== C3Q'S ===
In 2005, she was part of C3Q'S, a pop group within the soap opera Rebelde with Zoraida Gómez and Estefanía Villarreal, releasing only a single entitled "No Me Importa".

== Filmography ==
=== Films ===
Year	Title	Role	Notes
2007	J-ok'el	French girl	

=== Television ===
Year	Title	Role	Notes
2001	María Belén	Herself	Special participation
2004	Corazones al límite	Anette Elizalde	Special participation
2004–2006	Rebelde	Victoria "Vico" Paz Millán	Recurring role
2007	Objetos perdidos	Miss Fitzgerald	"Objeto 2" (Season 1, Episode 2)
2007	Muchachitas como tú	Margarita Villaseñor	Recurring role
2009	Mujeres asesinas	Soledad Oropeza	"Soledad, cautiva" (Season 2, Episode 8)
2008–2009	Alma de hierro	Sandra "Sandy" Hierro Jiménez	Recurring role
2009–2010	Corazón salvaje	Ángela Villareal / Jimena Villareal / Estrella Villareal	Recurring role
2010–2011	Teresa	Teresa Chávez Aguirre de De la Barrera	Lead role
2012	Abismo de pasión	Elisa Castañón Bouvier	Lead role
2013–2014	Lo que la vida me robó	Montserrat Mendonza Giacinti	Lead role
2016–2017	Tres veces Ana	Ana Lucía Hernández / Ana Laura / Ana Leticia Álvarez del Castillo	Lead role
2018–2019	Amar a muerte	Lucía Borges Duarte de Carvajal	Lead role
2020–2021	Imperio de mentiras	Elisa Cantú Robles	Lead role
2021	Vencer el pasado	Renata Sánchez Vidal	Lead role
2022	Vencer la ausencia	Renata Sánchez Vidal	Guest role
2023	El amor invencible	Marena Ramos / Leona Bravo	Lead role
2024–2025	El extraño retorno de Diana Salazar	Diana Salazar / Leonor de Santiago	Lead role
2025	Mujeres asesinas	Pilar	Episode: "Pilar"
2025	Doménica Montero	Doménica Montero Rivas	Lead role

== Awards and nominations ==
Year	Award	Category	Work	Result
2010	Premios TVyNovelas	Best Young Lead Actress	Corazón salvaje	Nominated
2010	Premios People en Español	Best Young Actress	Corazón salvaje	Nominated
2011	Premios TVyNovelas	Best Actress	Teresa	Won
2011	Premios People en Español	Best Couples with Aarón Díaz)	Teresa	Nominated
2011	Premios People en Español	Best Couples (with Sebastián Rulli)	Teresa	Nominated
2011	Premios People en Español	Best Actress	Teresa	Nominated
2011	Kids Choice Awards México	Favorite Female Character in a Series	Teresa	Nominated
2011	Kids Choice Awards México	Despicable	Teresa	Nominated
2011	Premios Bravo	Best Actress	Teresa	Won
2011	Premios Juventud	Best couples (with Aarón Díaz and Sebastián Rulli)	Teresa	Won
2011	Premios Juventud	Girl of My Dreams	Teresa	Nominated
2012	Premios ACE	Best Lead Actress	Teresa	Won
2012	Premios People en Español	Best Couples (with David Zepeda)	Abismo de pasión	Nominated
2012	Premios People en Español	Best actress	Abismo de pasión	Nominated
2012	Kids Choice Awards México	Favorite Actress	Abismo de pasión	Nominated
2012	Premios Juventud	Girl of My Dreams	Abismo de pasión	Nominated
2013	Premios TVyNovelas	Best Lead Actress	Abismo de pasión	Nominated
2014	Premios Juventud	Girl of My Dreams	Lo que la vida me robó	Won
2015	Premios TVyNovelas	Best Actress	Lo que la vida me robó	Nominated
2015	Favoritos del público	The Prettiest	Lo que la vida me robó	Nominated
2015	Favoritos del público	Favorite Kiss (with Sebastián Rulli)	Lo que la vida me robó	Nominated
2015	Favoritos del público	Favorite Couple (with Sebastián Rulli)	Lo que la vida me robó	Nominated
2015	Favoritos del público	Favorite Slap (with Daniela Castro)	Lo que la vida me robó	Nominated
2017	Premios TVyNovelas	Best Actress	Tres veces Ana	Won
2019	Premios TVyNovelas	Best Actress	Amar a Muerte	Won
2022	Premios Juventud	My Favorite Actress	Vencer el pasado	Nominated
2022	Premios Juventud	Best On-Screen Couple (with Sebastián Rulli)	Vencer el pasado	Won
2025	Premios Juventud	My Favorite Actress	El extraño retorno de Diana Salazar	Won
2025	Premios Juventud	They Make Me Fall in Love (with Sebastián Rulli)	El extraño retorno de Diana Salazar	Won
