= 2022 Premios Juventud =

2022 award ceremony

19th Premios Juventud
- Date: July 21, 2022
- Location: José Miguel Agrelot Coliseum
- Country: United States
- Hosted by: Danna Paola; Eduin Caz; Clarissa Molina; Prince Royce
- Most awards: Karol G (9)
- Most nominations: J Balvin and Karol G (11)
- Website: Official page

Television/radio coverage
- Network: Univision

The 19th Premios Juventud ceremony took place on July 21, 2022. Univision broadcast the show live from the José Miguel Agrelot Coliseum, with Danna Paola, Eduin Caz, Clarissa Molina and Prince Royce hosting the event.

Colombian singers J Balvin and Karol G lead the nominations with 11 nods each, followed by Puerto Rican singers Rauw Alejandro with 9 nominations and Farruko with 8 ones. Karol G was the most prized artist of the ceremony, with 9 awards.

== Performers ==
Artist(s)	Song(s)
Pre-show
Mora	"Tus Lágrimas" "La Inocente"
Kiko El Crazy; The Change	"Ibiza"
Main show
Daddy Yankee	"Rumbatón"
Grupo Firme; Lenin Ramírez	"El Tóxico" "En Tú Perra Vida" "Ya Supérame"
Boza; Lenny Tavárez; Juhn	"Ella (Remix)"
Mau y Ricky	"Llorar Y Llorar" "Mal Acostumbrao"
Manny Cruz	"Santo Domingo"
Luis Vazquez	"Tú Fan"
Yahaira Plasencia	"La Cantante"
Luis Figueroa	"Vienes"
Michael Stuart	"Bailemos"
Manny Cruz; Luis Vazquez; Yahaira Plasencia; Luis Figueroa; Michael Stuart	"Que Le Pongan Salsa" "La Fiesta De Pilito" "No Hay Cama Para Tanta Gente"
El Alfa	"Gogo Dance" "La Mamá De La Mamá" "La Romana"
Danna Paola	"A Un Beso"
Wisin & Yandel; Lenny Tavárez; Feid; Tainy; Natti Natasha	"Estoy Enamorado" "Te Siento" "Abusadora"
Ángela Aguilar	"Se Disfrazó" "Piel Canela"
Feid; Alejo; Robi	"Pantysito"
Prince Royce	"Te Espero" "Incondicional" "El Amor Que Perdimos" "Stand By Me" "Carita De Inocente" "Darte Un Beso" "Corazón Sin Cara"
Kany García; Goyo; Cazzu; Ángela Aguilar	"Hoy Ya Me Voy" "Agüita E Coco" "Para Siempre" "DPM (De Pxta Madre)"
Banda MS De Sergio Lizárraga	"La Casita"
Natti Natasha; Daddy Yankee; Wisin & Yandel	"Mayor Que Usted"
CNCO	"Plutón"
Farina	"Fiesta"
La Addictiva Banda San José De Mesillas; Lenín Ramirez	"Eso Es La Riqueza"
Farruko; El Alfa; DJ Adoni; La Perversa	"La Opinión Es Tuya"
Grupo Firme; Banda MS De Sergio Lizárraga	"No Llega El Olvido" "Ya Lo Sé" "Basta Ya" "Inolvidable"
J Balvin	"6 AM" "Reggaeton" "Ay Vamos" "In Da Getto"

== Winners and nominees ==
The nominees were announced on June 14, 2022. The winners are listed in bold.

=== General ===
Artist of the Youth – Male

- **Bad Bunny**
- Camilo
- Christian Nodal
- El Alfa
- Farruko
- J Balvin
- Maluma
- Rauw Alejandro
- Romeo Santos
- Sebastián Yatra

Artist of the Youth – Female

- **Karol G**
- Ángela Aguilar
- Anitta
- Becky G
- Kali Uchis
- María Becerra
- Natti Natasha
- Nicki Nicole
- Rosalía
- Sofía Reyes

Favorite Group or Duo of the Year

- **Grupo Firme**
- Calibre 50
- CNCO
- Gente de Zona
- Jesse & Joy
- Los Ángeles Azules
- Maná
- Mau y Ricky
- Reik
- Wisin & Yandel

Album of the Year

- **KG0516 – Karol G**
- Dharma – Sebastián Yatra
- Jose – J Balvin
- La 167 – Farruko
- La Última Promesa – Justin Quiles
- Legendaddy – Daddy Yankee
- Mis Manos – Camilo
- Motomami – Rosalía
- Nattividad – Natti Natasha
- Viceversa – Rauw Alejandro

The Catchiest Song

- **"Provenza" – Karol G**
- "A La Antigüita" – Calibre 50
- "Envolver" – Anitta
- "In da Getto" – J Balvin & Skrillex
- "Lao’ A Lao" – Prince Royce
- "Pa’lla Voy" – Marc Anthony
- "Pepas" – Farruko
- "Sus Huellas" – Romeo Santos
- "Todo de Ti" – Rauw Alejandro
- "Ya Supérame (En vivo)" – Grupo Firme

Best Girl Power Collab

- **"Mamiii" – Becky G & Karol G**
- "24/7" – Sofía Reyes & The Change
- "Báilalo Mujer" – Flor de Rap & Denise Rosenthal
- "Hasta los Dientes" – Camila Cabello & María Becerro
- "La Niña De La Escuela" – Lola Índigo, Tini & Belinda
- "Linda" – Tokischa & Rosalía
- "Pa Mis Muchachas" – Christina Aguilera, Becky G, Nicki Nicole feat. Nathy Peluso
- "Piketona"" – Lele Pons & Kim Loaiza
- "Roce" – Paopao, La Gabi, Villano Antillano, Aria Vega & Cami Da Baby
- "Yummy Yummy Love" – Momoland & Natti Natasha

The New Generation – Female

- **Evaluna Montaner**
- Bad Gyal
- Corina Smith
- Ingratax
- Kim Loaiza
- La Gabi
- Las Villa
- Lola Indigo
- Ptazeta
- Tokischa

The New Generation – Male

- **Ryan Castro**
- Alejo
- Blessd
- Boza
- Duki
- Lit Killah
- Luis Vazquez
- Ovi
- Robi
- Tiago Pzk

Male Artist – On the Rise

- **El Alfa**
- Eladio Carrión
- Feid
- Jay Wheeler
- Jhayco
- Justin Quiles
- Lenny Tavárez
- Mora
- Paulo Londra
- Sech

Female Artist – On the Rise

- **Ángela Aguilar**
- Cazzu
- Emilia
- Farina
- Kali Uchis
- María Becerra
- Mariah Angeliq
- Nathy Peluso
- Nicki Nicole
- Tini

My Favorite Streaming Artist

- **Karol G**
- Anitta
- Bad Bunny
- Camilo
- Christian Nodal
- Daddy Yankee
- Farruko
- Grupo Firme
- J Balvin
- Rauw Alejandro

Best Song by a Couple

- **"Índigo" – Camilo & Evaluna Montaner**
- "Att: Amor" – Greeicy & Mike Bahía
- "Dangerous" – Nicki Nicole, Trueno & Bizarrap
- "Esto Recién Empieza" – Duki & Emilia
- "Si Tú Me Busca" – Anuel AA & Yailin La Más Viral

The Perfect Mix

- **"El Incomprendido" – Farruko, Víctor Cárdenas & DJ Adoni**
- "Canción Bonita" – Carlos Vives & Ricky Martin
- "Emojis De Corazones" – Wisin, Jhayco & Ozuna feat. Los Legendarios
- "Fan De Tus Fotos" – Nicky Jam & Romeo Santos
- "Mojando Asientos" – Maluma & Feid
- "Pareja del Año" – Sebastián Yatra & Myke Towers
- "Se Menea" – Don Omar & Nio García
- "Una Nota" – J Balvin & Sech
- "Volví" – Aventura & Bad Bunny
- "Wow BB" – Natti Natasha, El Alfa & Chimbala

Collaboration OMG

- **"Don´t Be Shy" – Tiësto & Karol G**
- "Kesi" (Remix) – Camilo & Shawn Mendes
- "La Fama" – Rosalía & The Weeknd
- "Mamá Tetema" – Maluma feat. Rayvanny
- "Nostálgico" – Rvssian, Rauw Alejandro & Chris Brown
- "Oh Na Na" – Camila Cabello, Myke Towers & Tainy
- "Santo" – Christina Aguilera & Ozuna
- "SG" – DJ Snake, Ozuna, Megan Thee Stallion & Lisa of Blackpink
- "Sigue" – J Balvin & Ed Sheeran
- "Tacones Rojos" – Sebastián Yatra & John Legend

Viral Track of the Year

- **"Pepas" – Farruko**
- "Envolver" (Remix) – Anitta & Justin Quiles
- "Índigo" – Camilo & Evaluna Montaner
- "Mamiii" – Becky G & Karol G
- "Medallo" – Blessd, Justin Quiles & Lenny Tavárez
- "Poblado" (Remix) – J Balvin, Karol G & Nicky Jam feat. Crissin, Totoy El Frío & Natan y Shander
- "Qué Más Pues?" – J Balvin & María Becerra
- "Sobrio" – Maluma
- "Todo De Ti" – Rauw Alejandro
- "Yonaguni" – Bad Bunny

The Best "Beatmakers"

- **Ovy on the Drums**
- Albert Hype
- Bizarrap
- Caleb Calloway
- Edgar Barrera
- Los Legendarios
- Mr. Naisgai
- MVSIS
- Sky Rompiendo
- Tainy

The Hottest Choreography

- **"Envolver" – Anitta**
- "Chicken Teriyaki" – Rosalía
- "Disciplina" – Lali
- "Todo De Ti" – Rauw Alejandro
- "Wow BB" – Natti Natasha, El Alfa & Chimbala

=== Regional Mexican ===
Regional Mexican Album of the Year

- **Mexicana Enamorada – Ángela Aguilar**
- Alma Vacía – Ivan Cornejo
- Del Barrio Hasta Aquí, Vol. 2 – Fuerza Regida
- Esta Vida Es Muy Bonita – Banda el Recodo de Cruz Lizárraga
- Inédito – Carin León
- La Ley De La Vida – Luis Ángel ‘El Flaco’
- Mi Herencia, Mi Sangre – Majo Aguilar
- Mi Vida En Un Cigarro 2 – Junior H
- Vamos Bien – Calibre 50
- Ya Solo Eres Mi Ex – La Addictiva Banda San José de Mesillas

Best Regional Mexican Song

- **"Ya Supérame" (en vivo)" – Grupo Firme**
- "Ahí Donde Me Ven" – Ángela Aguilar
- "A La Antigüita" – Calibre 50
- "La Casita" – Banda MS de Sergio Lizárraga
- "¿Qué Tienen Tus Palabras?" – Banda el Recodo de Cruz Lizárraga
- "Sin Miedo Al Éxito" – Banda Los Sebastianes
- "Soy Buen Amigo" – El Fantasma
- "Soy El Único" – Yahritza y Su Esencia
- "Ya No Somos Ni Seremos" – Christian Nodal
- "Ya Solo Eres Mi Ex" – La Addictiva Banda San José de Mesillas

Best Regional Mexican Collaboration

- **"En Tu Perra Vida" – Grupo Firme & Lenin Ramírez**
- "2 Veces" – Los Plebes Del Rancho de Ariel Camacho & Christian Nodal
- "Amores Van y Vienen" – La Nueva Estrategia & La Maquinaria Norteña
- "El Columpio" – Banda Los Sebastianes & Los Rieleros del Norte
- "El Triste Alegre" (en vivo) – Banda Carnava & Calibre 50
- "La Sinvergüenza" – Christian Nodal & Banda MS de Sergio Lizárraga
- "Mariachi Tumbado" – Danny Felix feat. Mariachi Vargas de Tecalitlán
- "Mariposa Traicionera" – Maná & Alejandro Fernández
- "Señorita Cantinera" – Los Rieleros del Norte feat. Polo Urías y su Máquina Norteña
- "Te Encontré" – Ulices Chaidez & Eslabon Armado

Best Regional Mexican Fusion

- **"Cada Quien" – Grupo Firme & Maluma**
- "Como Lo Hice Yo" – Matisse & Carin León
- "Ella Qué Te Dio" – Ángela Aguilar & Jesse & Joy
- "Está Dañada" (Remix) – Ivan Cornejo & Jhayco
- "Fino Licor" – Gerardo Ortíz feat. Piso 21
- "Las Locuras Mías" – Omar Chaparro feat. Joey Montana
- "Monterrey" – Guaynaa & Pain Digital
- "Otra Noche" – Los Ángeles Azules & Nicki Nicole
- "Qué Bueno Es Tenerte" – Natalia Jiménez & Banda MS de Sergio Lizárraga
- "Te Lloré Un Río" – Maná & Christian Nodal

The New Generation – Regional Mexican

- **Santa Fe Klan**
- Dannylux
- Gera Mx
- Ivan Cornejo
- Los Del Limit
- Luis R. Conriquez
- Lupita Infante
- Majo Aguilar
- Ramón Vega
- Yahritza y Su Esencia

=== Tropical ===
Best Tropical Hit

- **"Sus Huellas" – Romeo Santos**
- "Agüita E Coco" – Kany García
- "Cartas Sobre La Mesa" – Gilberto Santa Rosa
- "Cumbiana" – Carlos Vives
- "Hasta El Sol De Hoy" (Versión Salsa) – Luis Figueroa
- "Lao’ A Lao" – Prince Royce
- "No Hay" – El Gran Combo De Puerto Rico
- "Pa’lla Voy" – Marc Anthony
- "Pa’ Que Me Perdones" – Héctor Acosta ‘El Torito’
- "Tu Fan" – Luis Vazquez

Best Tropical Mix

- **"Te Espero" – Prince Royce & María Becerra**
- "Besos En Cualquier Horario" – Carlos Vives, Mau y Ricky & Lucy Vives
- "Dame Una Noche" – Manny Cruz, Daniel Santacruz & Nacho
- "Dios Así Lo Quiso" – Ricardo Montaner & Juan Luis Guerra 4.40
- "Háblame de Miami" – Gente de Zona & Maffio
- "La Bendición" – Farruko & Lenier
- "Lluvia y Samba" – Elvis Crespo, Gilberto Santa Rosa & Alex Bueno
- "Pa’mi" – Peter Nieto & Ivy Queen
- "Señor Juez" – Ozuna & Romeo Santos
- "Tú No Bailas Más Que Yo" – Jerry Rivera & Don Omar

=== Digital ===
Video with Best Social Message

- **"Niño Soñador" – J Balvin**
- "DPM (De P*ta Madre)" – Kany García
- "Gracias" – Pedro Capó
- "My Lova" – Farruko
- "This Is Not America" – Residente feat. Ibeyi

Popular Artist or Influencer

- **Karol G**
- Ángela Aguilar
- Danna Paola
- Domelipa
- Eduin Caz
- El Alfa
- Karol Sevilla
- Kim Loaiza
- Lele Pons
- Luisito Comunica

Best Social Media Power Couple

- **Becky G & Sebastian Lletget**
- Anuel AA & Yailin La Más Viral
- Emilia & Duki
- Gabriel Soto & Irina Baeva
- Juanpa Zurita & Macarena Achaga

Best Fandom

- **CNCO – CNCOwners**
- Ángela Aguilar – Angelitos
- Camilo – La Tribu
- Carlos Rivera – Riveristas
- Jay Wheeler – Rueditas
- Tini – Tinistas

Best Social Dance Challenge

- **"Don´t Be Shy" – Tiësto & Karol G**
- "Bombón" – Daddy Yankee, El Alfa & Lil Jon
- "Envolver" – Anitta
- "Fiel" – Los Legendarios, Wisin & Jhayco
- "Fuera del Mercado" – Danny Ocean
- "In Da Getto" – J Balvin & Skrillex
- "Jordan" – Ryan Castro
- "Linda" – Tokischa & Rosalía
- "Mon Amour" (Remix) – Zzoilo & Aitana
- "Problemón" – Álvaro Díaz & Rauw Alejandro

Trendiest Artist

- **Karol G**
- Bad Bunny
- Danna Paola
- Emilia
- Goyo
- Grupo Firme
- J Balvin
- Maluma
- Rauw Alejandro
- Reik

=== Television ===
My Favorite Actor

- **Sebastián Rulli – Vencer el pasado**
- Gabriel Soto – Soltero con hijas
- Jesús Zavala – Búnker
- José Ron – La desalmada
- Oscar Isaac – Moon Knight

My Favorite Actress

- **Danna Paola – Elite**
- Angelique Boyer – Vencer el pasado
- Carolina Miranda - ¿Quién mató a Sara?
- Macarena Achaga – Luis Miguel: The Series
- Yalitza Aparicio – Hijas de Brujas

Best On-Screen Couple

- **Angelique Boyer & Sebastián Rulli – Vencer el pasado**
- Livia Brito & José Ron – La desalmada
- Maite Perroni & Alejandro Speitzer – Oscuro deseo
- Susana González & David Zepeda – Mi fortuna es amarte
- Úrsula Corberó & Miguel Herrán – La casa de papel
