= Xavi =

Xavi (Catalan pronunciation: [ˈʃaβi]) is a Catalan given name, usually used as a nickname for Xavier. Notable people with the name include:

== Football ==
- Xavi Andorrà (born 1985), Andorran footballer
- Xavi Annunziata (born 1987), Spanish footballer
- Xavi Gnaulati (born 2005), American soccer player
- Xavi Molina (born 1986), Spanish footballer
- Xavi Moro (born 1975), Spanish footballer
- Xavi Simons (born 2003), Dutch footballer
- Xavi Torres (born 1986), Spanish footballer
- Xavi Valero (born 1973), Spanish footballer
- Xavi (footballer, born 1980), Spanish football manager and former player Xavi Hernández
- Xavi (Portuguese footballer), Portuguese footballer Cristiano Xavier Gonçalves Carvalho (born 1983)

== Other ==
- Xavi Lleonart (born 1990), Spanish field hockey player
- Xavi Rabaseda (born 1989), Spanish basketball player
- Xavi Rey (born 1987), Spanish basketball player
- Xavi Vallmajó (born 1975), Spanish basketball player
- Xavi Vierge (born 1997), Spanish motorcycle racer
- Xavi (singer) (born 2005), Mexican-American singer

== See also ==
- Xavier (disambiguation)
