= El extraño retorno de Diana Salazar (2024 TV series) =

- Genre: Drama
- Based on: El extraño retorno de Diana Salazar by Mario Cruz
- Developed by: Esther Feldman
- Written by: Esther Feldman; Carlos Algara
- Directed by: Luis Manzo; Pável Vázquez; Carlos Santos
- Starring: Angelique Boyer; Sebastián Rulli; Arap Bethke; Cassandra Sánchez Navarro; Lorena Graniewicz; Erick Chapa; Sergio Mur
- Composers: Jaime Vargas Fabila; Carlos Páramo; Oskar Gritten
- Country of origin: Mexico
- Original language: Spanish
- No. of seasons: 3
- No. of episodes: 24

Production
- Executive producers: Patricio Wills; Carlos Bardasano
- Producer: Carmen Cecilia Urbaneja Llamozas
- Editor: Alba Merchán Hamann
- Camera setup: Multi-camera
- Production companies: W Studios; TelevisaUnivision

Original release
- Network: Vix
- Release: 17 May 2024 – 11 April 2025

El extraño retorno de Diana Salazar is a Mexican television series produced by W Studios for TelevisaUnivision. It is based on the 1988 telenovela of the same name, created by Mario Cruz. It stars Angelique Boyer and Sebastián Rulli. The series premiered on Vix on 17 May 2024. The second season premiered on 17 January 2025. The third and final season premiered on 11 April 2025.

== Cast ==
=== Main ===
- Angelique Boyer as Diana Salazar / Leonor de Santiago
- Sebastián Rulli as Mario Villarreal / Eduardo de Carvajal
- Arap Bethke as Joaquín Nuñez / Lucas de Treviño
- Cassandra Sánchez Navarro as Irene Vallejos / Inés Betancourt
- Lorena Graniewicz as Malena
  - Farah Cardell as child Malena
- Erick Chapa as Gael
- Sergio Mur as Gonzalo

=== Recurring and guest stars ===
- Rubén Sanz as Fray Rodrigo
- Eduardo Victoria as Gustavo
- Paola Toyos as Ana
- Sergio Jurado as Mayol
- Iván Tamayo as San Telmo
- Axel Alcántara as Rolando
- Lorena Sevilla as Reina
- Pamela Reul as Gaby
- Teresa Peragui as Mariana
- Amhed García as Xavier
- Paola Dives as Fabiola
- Sergio Reynoso as Emiliano
  - Paco Rosado as young Emiliano
- Vanessa Saba as Aurelia
- Henry Zakka as Otálora
- Yael Albores as Raquel
- Mónica Dionne as Delfina
  - Rocío De Santiago as young Delfina
- Emoé de la Parra as Sister Beatriz
- Laura Vignatti as Ofelia

== Episodes ==
Season	Episodes	Originally released
1	8	17 May 2024
2	8	17 January 2025
3	8	11 April 2025

=== Season 1 (2024) ===
No. overall	No. in season	Title	Original release date
1	1	"Encuentros"	17 May 2024
2	2	"Confesiones"	17 May 2024
3	3	"La llamada"	17 May 2024
4	4	"Camino sin retorno"	17 May 2024
5	5	"Almas viejas"	17 May 2024
6	6	"Entre temblores"	17 May 2024
7	7	"¿Verdad o locura?"	17 May 2024
8	8	"El viente de la ballena"	17 May 2024

=== Season 2 (2025) ===
No. overall	No. in season	Title	Original release date
9	1	"Desencuentros"	17 January 2025
10	2	"Revelaciones"	17 January 2025
11	3	"Despertares"	17 January 2025
12	4	"Señales"	17 January 2025
13	5	"Recluidos"	17 January 2025
14	6	"Punto de convergencia"	17 January 2025
15	7	"Recluidos"	17 January 2025
16	8	"Un talento peligroso"	17 January 2025

=== Season 3 (2025) ===
No. overall	No. in season	Title	Original release date
17	1	"Fuera de control"	11 April 2025
18	2	"Reconciliaciones"	11 April 2025
19	3	"Sospecha"	11 April 2025
20	4	"Falsa libertad"	11 April 2025
21	5	"Punto de quiebre"	11 April 2025
22	6	"Miseria"	11 April 2025
23	7	"Jugando con fuego"	11 April 2025
24	8	"Almas en pena"	11 April 2025

== Production ==
=== Development ===
On 17 May 2023, the series was announced at TelevisaUnivision's upfront for the 2023–2024 television season. In July 2023, the cast had their first table read. Filming of the series began on 17 August 2023, and concluded on 16 December 2023.

=== Casting ===
In May 2023, Angelique Boyer and Sebastián Rulli were announced in the lead roles. In July 2023, Arap Bethke and Cassandra Sánchez Navarro joined the cast. In August 2023, the rest of the cast was unveiled in a press release.

== Release ==
The series premiered on Vix on 17 May 2024. The second season premiered on 17 January 2025. The series made its broadcast television premiere on Univision on 19 January 2025. The third and final season premiered on 11 April 2025.

== Awards and nominations ==
Year	Award	Category	Nominated	Result	Ref
2024	Produ Awards	Best Superseries	El extraño retorno de Diana Salazar	Nominated	
2024	Produ Awards	Best Screenplay - Superseries or Telenovela	Esther Feldman y Carlos Algara	Nominated	
2025	Produ Awards	Best Romantic Drama Series	El extraño retorno de Diana Salazar	Nominated	
2025	Produ Awards	Best Lead Actress - Romantic Drama Series	Angelique Boyer	Nominated	
2025	Produ Awards	Best Lead Actor - Romantic Drama Series	Sebastián Rulli	Nominated	
