= Anita Blanch =

Spanish-born Mexican actress

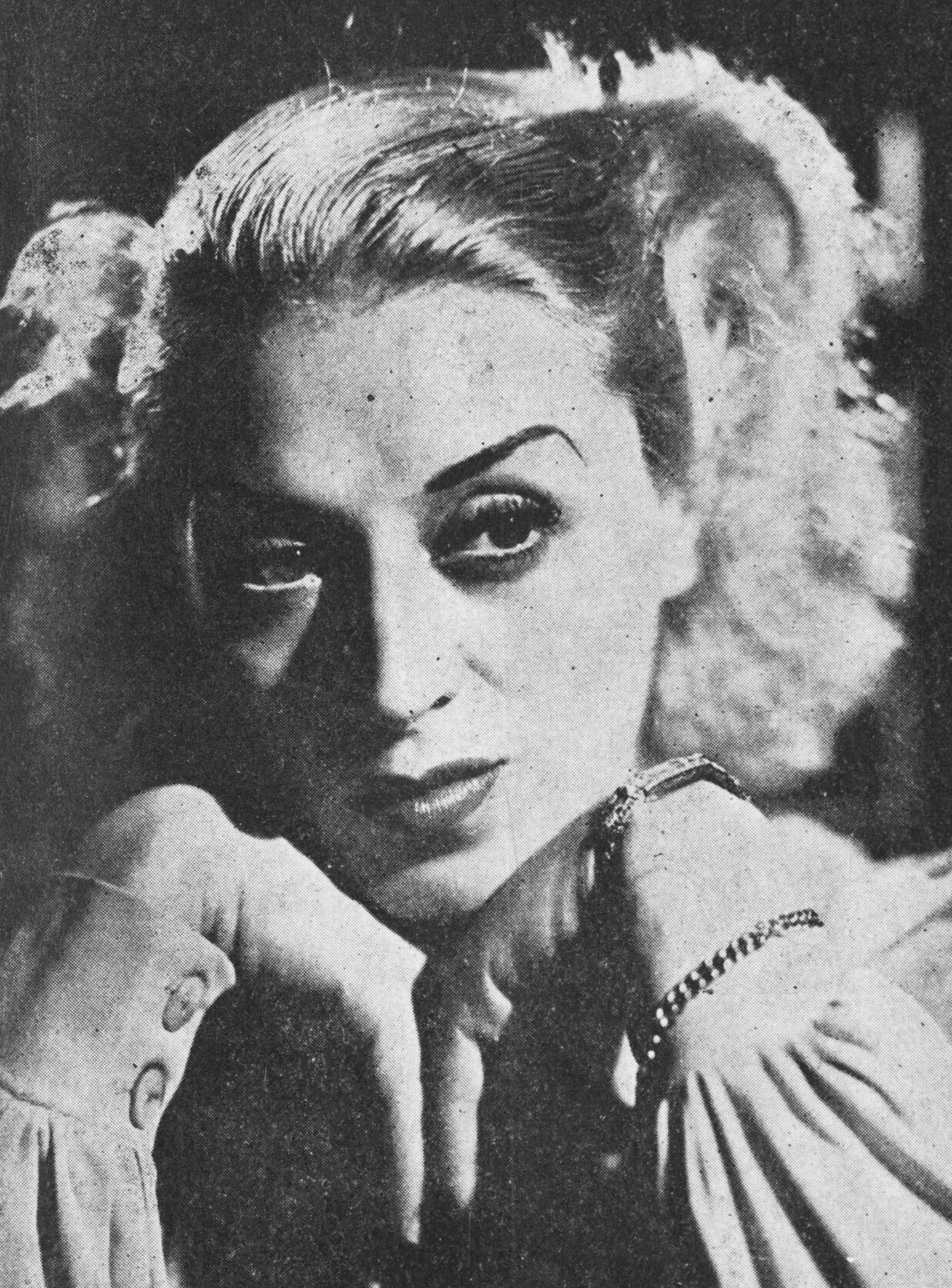
- Blanch in 1945
- Born: Ana Maria Blanch Ruiz; 26 July 1910; Sagunto, Valencia, Spain
- Died: 23 April 1983 (aged 72); Mexico City, Mexico
- Occupation: actress
- Years active: 1928–1982

Ana María Blanch Ruiz (26 July 1910 – 23 April 1983), known professionally as Anita Blanch, was a Spanish-born Mexican actress during the Golden Age of Mexican cinema. She was nominated for an Ariel Award from the Mexican Academy of Film three times and won the Best Supporting Actress Award from Diosa de Plata (Silver Goddess Award) in 1963.

== Biography ==
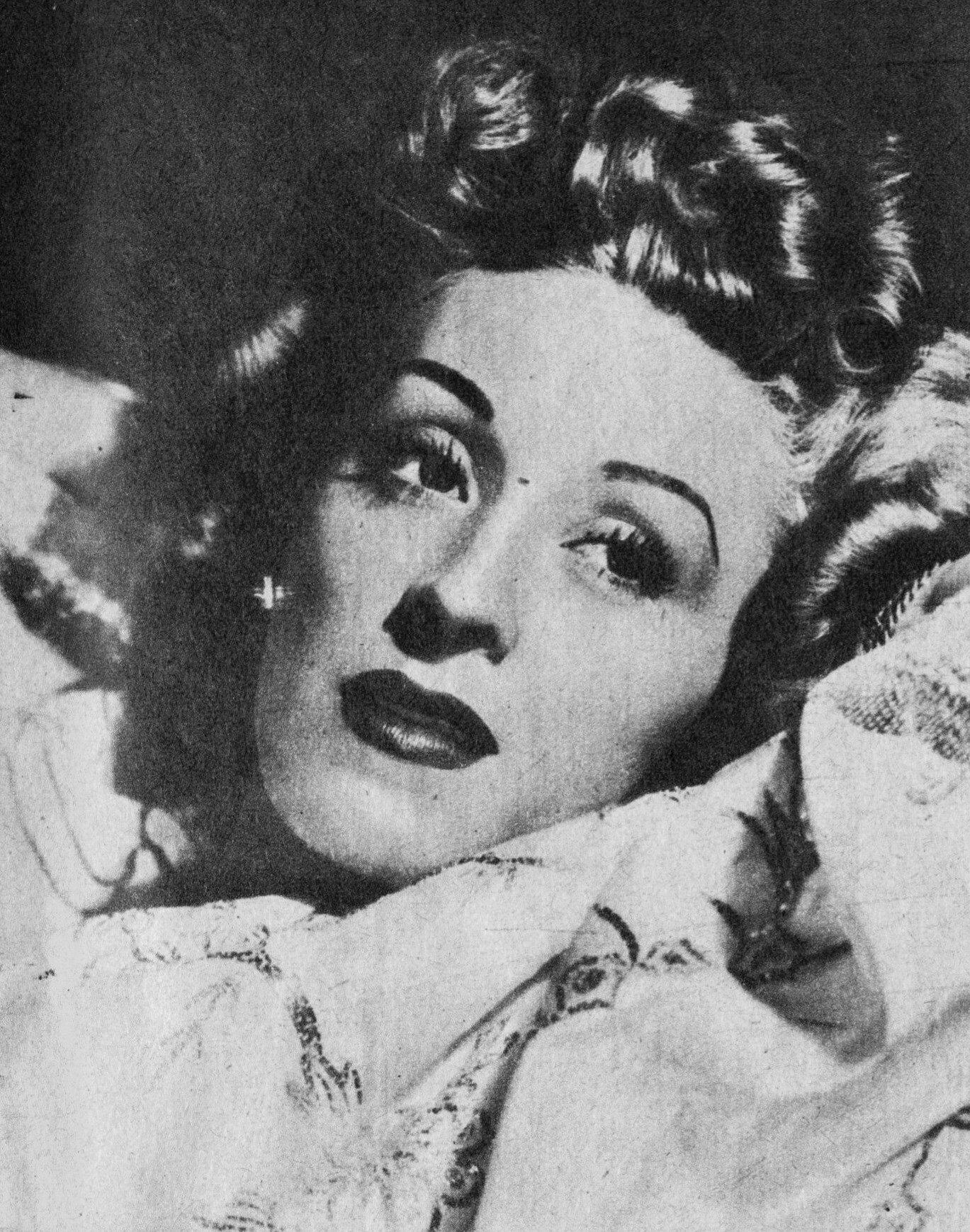
Anita Blanch in 1954

Ana María Blanch Ruiz was born on 26 July 1910 in Sagunto, Valencia. Ana, who went by the name of "Anita" and her sister, actress Isabelita Blanch, who both had interest in the theater, arrived in Mexico in the 1920s. Blanch specialized in comedic plays and her theatrical debut was in a performance of “La cabalgata de los reyes”. Blanch was the first star of the prestigious "Ideal Theater" in Mexico City. She and her sister founded the Compañía de Teatro Anita Blanch (Anita Blanch Theater Company), hiring artists like Ángel Garasa, Rafael Banquells, and Jose Cibrian, among others. Throughout her career, she had several successful theatrical runs, including works such as: "Quien te quiere a ti" (1928), "El sexo débil" (1930), "Don Juan Tenorio" (1935), "Arsénico y encaje" (1942) and "El escándalo" (1947).

Anita's film debut in the film "Luponini de Chicago" was made in 1935. After terrible reviews, she did not make movies for the next 6 years, but studied her craft on stage with such productions as: “No hables mal de los gitanos” by Enrique Bohorques; “La mujer legitima” by Xavier Villaurrutia; “Doña hormiga” by Alvarez Quintero; “El amor las vuelve locas” by Enrique Suárez, among others. She returned to film in 1941 with "¡Ay, que tiempos, señor don Simón!" and made several successful films: "¿Quién te quiere a ti?", "El conde de Montecristo", "Alejandra", "El abanico de Lady Windermere" and La barraca. La barraca was completed in 1945 and Blanch was nominated for a best actress award from the Ariel Awards.

Despite this success, she was blackballed by the film industry in a labor dispute between the two actor's unions, STPC and STIC. She returned to the stage and in 1945 performed the first presentation ever held at the Teatro Xicohténcatl, in Tlaxcala, with the comedy "Siete mujeres de Navarro y Torrado". In 1951, she performed in the play "Mamá nos quita los novios" Finally in 1951, the labor dispute ended and she and other actresses who had returned to the theater, began filming again. Her first film after her return was "Te sigo esperando" in 1951. She made movies until the early 1980s. Her most successful films in this last period were "Tlayucan" in 1963 for which she won a best supporting actress award from the Diosa de Plata; "Los días del amor" of 1973 and "Presagio" in 1975, both of which she was nominated for an Ariel Award for best supporting actress.

Beginning in 1960 with the telenovela "El Otro" her career turned toward television. The latter half of her acting career largely focused on telenovelas. Two of her most popular were "Mamá campanita" and "En busca del paraíso". Around this time, Blanch met her life partner, the novelist, journalist and film and television screenwriter, Josefina Vicens, with whom she lived until her death.

In 1970 Blanch, along with Socorro Avelar, Dolores del Río, Irma Dorantes, Gloria Marín, Carmen Montejo, Silvia Pinal, and Amparo Rivelles joined to form a group called “Rosa Mexicano” with the intent of protecting actresses and their children. The project had been the brain child of Fanny Schiller, who pushed the National Association of Actors (ANDA) to form nurseries for actress's children. The idea was that by establishing a nursery, actresses could continue working, and by establishing a Montessori education system, their children would receive a strong educational foundation. After operating in temporary spaces, the first stones for the formal location were laid on 30 April 1972.

Blanch died on 23 April 1983 in Mexico City.

== Awards and nominations ==
- 1947, La barraca, best actress, nominated for Ariel
- 1963, "Tlayucan", best supporting actress, Won Diosa de Plata Award
- 1973, "Los días del amor", best actress co-performance, nominated for Ariel
- 1975, "Presagio", best actress co-performance, nominated for Ariel

== Filmography ==
=== Film ===
- Luponini from Chicago (1935)
- La casa del rencor (1941)
- Oh, What Times, Don Simon! (1941)
- ¿Quién te quiere a tí? (1942)
- The Count of Monte Cristo (1942)
- Alejandra (1942)
- Simón Bolívar (1942)
- Casa de mujeres (1942)
- La vírgen roja (1943)
- Tres hermanos (1943)
- Miguel Strogoff (1944)
- La Pequeña madrecita (also known as The Little Mother) (1944)
- The Two Orphans (1944)
- Toda una vida (1944)
- El abanico de Lady Windermere (also known as Lady Windermere's Fan) (1944)
- Entre hermanos (1945)
- La barraca (1945)
- I Will Never Leave You (1948)
- Te sigo esperando (1951)
- Mujeres sacrificadas (1952)
- Sister Alegría (1952)
- Misericordia (1952)
- Aventura en Río (1952)
- The Great Deceiver (also known as Artificial Sons) (1953)
- Canción de cuna (also known as Cradle Song) (1953)
- Me perderé contigo (1954)
- Dios nos manda vivir (1954)
- Maldita ciudad (1954)
- El mil amores (1954)
- Magdalena (1955)
- La Faraona (1955)
- El Águila negra vs. los diablos de la pradera (1956)
- La Mujer que no tuvo infancia (1957) (also known as The Woman Who Had No Childhood)
- La torre de marfil (1957)
- Los Salvajes (1957)
- Yo pecador (also known as I, Sinner) (1959)
- La Chamaca (1960)
- Aventuras de Joselito en América (also known as The Adventures of Joselito and Tom Thumb) (1960)
- Tlayucan (also known as The Pearl of Tlayucan) (1961)
- Ave sin nido (1969)
- Los problemas de mamá (1970)
- Renzo, el gitano (1970)
- Pubertinaje (1971)
- Los días del amor (also known as The Days of Love) (1971)
- Mujercitas (1972)
- Mi mesera (1973)
- Los Perros de Dios (1973)
- Fe, esperanza y caridad (1974)
- Presagio (also known as Presage) (1974)
- El Hombre del puente (also known as The Man on the Bridge) (1975)
- Balún Canán (1976)
- Vivir Para Amar (1979)
- El Testamento (1980)

=== Telenovelas ===
- Cuidado con el ángel (1959)
- El otro (1960)
- Mi amor frente al pasado (1960)
- El enemigo (1961)
- Sor Juana Inés de la Cruz (1962)
- Janina (1962)
- La cobarde (1962)
- El caminante (1962)
- Grandes ilusiones (1963)
- Debiera haber obispas (1964)
- Apasionada (1964)
- Maximiliano y Carlota (1965)
- Llamada urgente (1965)
- Alma de mi alma (1965)
- Amor y orgullo (1965)
- El derecho de nacer (1966)
- La tormenta (1967)
- El juicio de nuestros hijos (1967)
- Dicha robada (1967)
- Mujeres sin amor (1968)
- Intriga (1968)
- Duelo de pasiones (1968)
- No creo en los hombres (1969)
- Mi amor por ti (1969)
- Del altar a la tumba (1969)
- Mis tres amores (1971)
- Las máscaras (1971)
- Las fieras (1972)
- El carruaje (1972)
- Cartas sin destino (1973)
- El chofer (1974)
- El milagro de vivir (1975)
- Mundos opuestos (1976)
- Mamá campanita (1978)
- Vamos juntos (1979)
- Nosotras las mujeres (1981)
- En busca del paraíso (1982)
