= List of Mexican films of 1974 =

Title	Director	Cast	Genre	Notes
Adorables mujercitas	José Díaz Morales	Rocío Banquells, Nubia Martí, Maritza Olivares, Delia Peña Orta, Ricardo Cortés	Romantic comedy	
Algo es algo dijo el diablo	Fernando Cortés	La India María, Jorge Lavat, Ángel Garasa		
La amargura de mi raza				
Ante el cadáver de un líder				
The Holy Office	Arturo Ripstein	Jorge Luke, Diana Bracho, Claudio Brook		Entered into the 1974 Cannes Film Festival
La Choca	Emilio Fernández	Pilar Pellicer, Gregorio Casal, Meche Carreño		
La isla de los hombres solos	René Cardona	Eric del Castillo, Wolf Rubinskys		
Conserje en condominio	Miguel M. Delgado	Cantinflas, Claudia Islas, Raquel Olmedo		
Pistoleros bajo el sol	Rubén Galindo	Fernando Almada, Sasha Montenegro, Marco Antonio Campos "Viruta", Juan Gallardo		
El hijo de Alma Grande	Tito Novaro	Blue Demon, Ana Bertha Lepe, Noe Murayama		Filmed in Belize.
Soy chicano y mexicano	Tito Novaro	Cornelio Reyna, Ana Bertha Lepe		
Chanoc en el foso de las serpientes	Gilberto Martínez Solares	Humberto Gurza, Ramón Valdés		
Pobre niño rico	José María Fernández Unsáin	Maricruz Olivier, Ricardo Blume, Nora Larraga "Karla"		
El tuerto Angustias	José Delfos	Julián Bravo, Sonia Furió, Claudio Lanuza		Co-production with Guatemala
El muro del silencio	Luis Alcoriza	Brontis Jodorowsky, David Reynoso, Claudio Brook, Milton Rodríguez		Filmed in Colombia.
La madrecita	Fernando Cortés	La India María, Martha Roth, Pancho Córdova, Alfonso Zayas		
El hijo del pueblo	René Cardona	Vicente Fernández, Lucía Méndez, Sara García, Rebeca Silva		
Traiganlos vivos o muertos	Rubén Galindo	Rodolfo de Anda, Pedro Armendáriz Jr., Roberto "Flaco" Guzmán		
Duro pero Seguro	Fernando Cortés	La India María, Jorge Lavat, Maribel Fernández "La Pelangocha", Ángel Garasa		
Cinco mil dolares de recompensa	Jorge Fons	Jorge Luke, Pedro Armendáriz Jr., Claudio Brook		
Debieron ahorcarlos antes	Rubén Galindo	Mario Almada, Fernando Almada, Jacqueline Voltaire		
El pistolero del diablo	Rubén Galindo	Mario Almada, Fernando Almada, Elsa Cárdenas		
Calzonzin Inspector	Alfonso Arau			
Tívoli	Alberto Isaac	Lyn May, Carmen Salinas		
Fe, Esperanza y Caridad	Alberto Bojorquez, Luis Alcoriza, Jorge Fons	Katy Jurado, Sara García, Fabiola Falcon, Milton Rodrigues		
Chosen Survivors	Sutton Roley	Jackie Cooper, Alex Cord, Richard Jaeckel, Bradford Dillman, Pedro Armendáriz Jr., Diana Muldaur		Co-production with the United States
De sangre chicana	Joselito Rodríguez	Pepe Romay, José Chávez Trowe, Elizabeth Dupeyrón		
El tesoro de Morgan	Zacarías Gómez Urquiza	Pilar Bayona, Lorena Velázquez		
Once Upon a Scoundrel	George Schaefer	Zero Mostel, Katy Jurado, A Martinez		Co-production with the United States
Viento salvaje	Zacarías Gómez Urquiza	Eric del Castillo, Regina Torné, Víctor Junco, Rosalba Brambila		
