= Jacqueline Andere =

Mexican actress (born 1938)

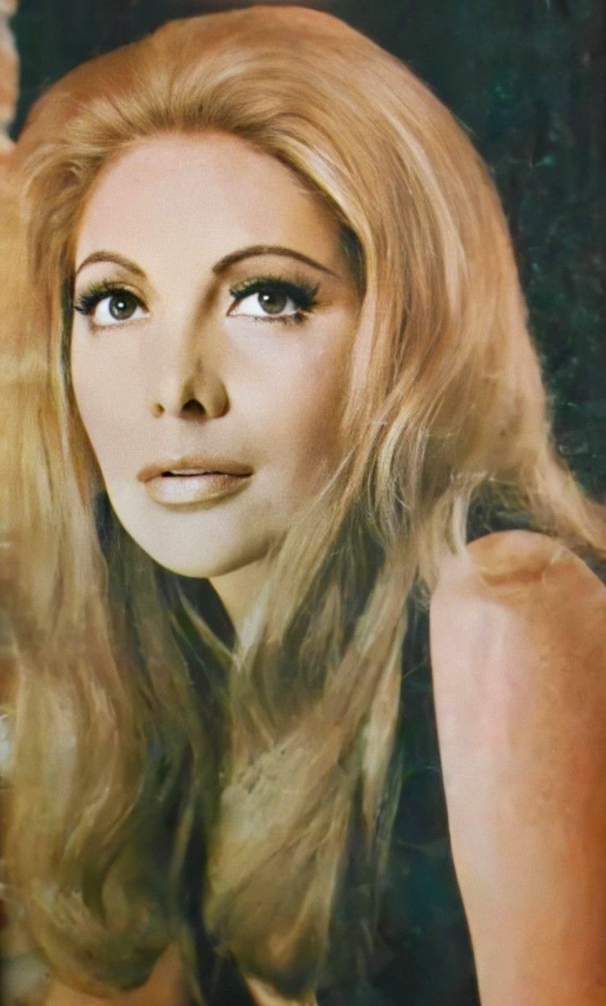
- Andere in 1970
- Born: María Esperanza Jacqueline Andere Aguilar; August 20, 1938 (age 88); Mexico City, Mexico
- Occupation: Actress
- Years active: 1959–present
- Spouse: José María Fernández Unsáin (m. 1967; died 1997)
- Children: Chantal Andere

María Esperanza Jacqueline Andere Aguilar (born August 20, 1938) is a Mexican actress.

== Life and career ==
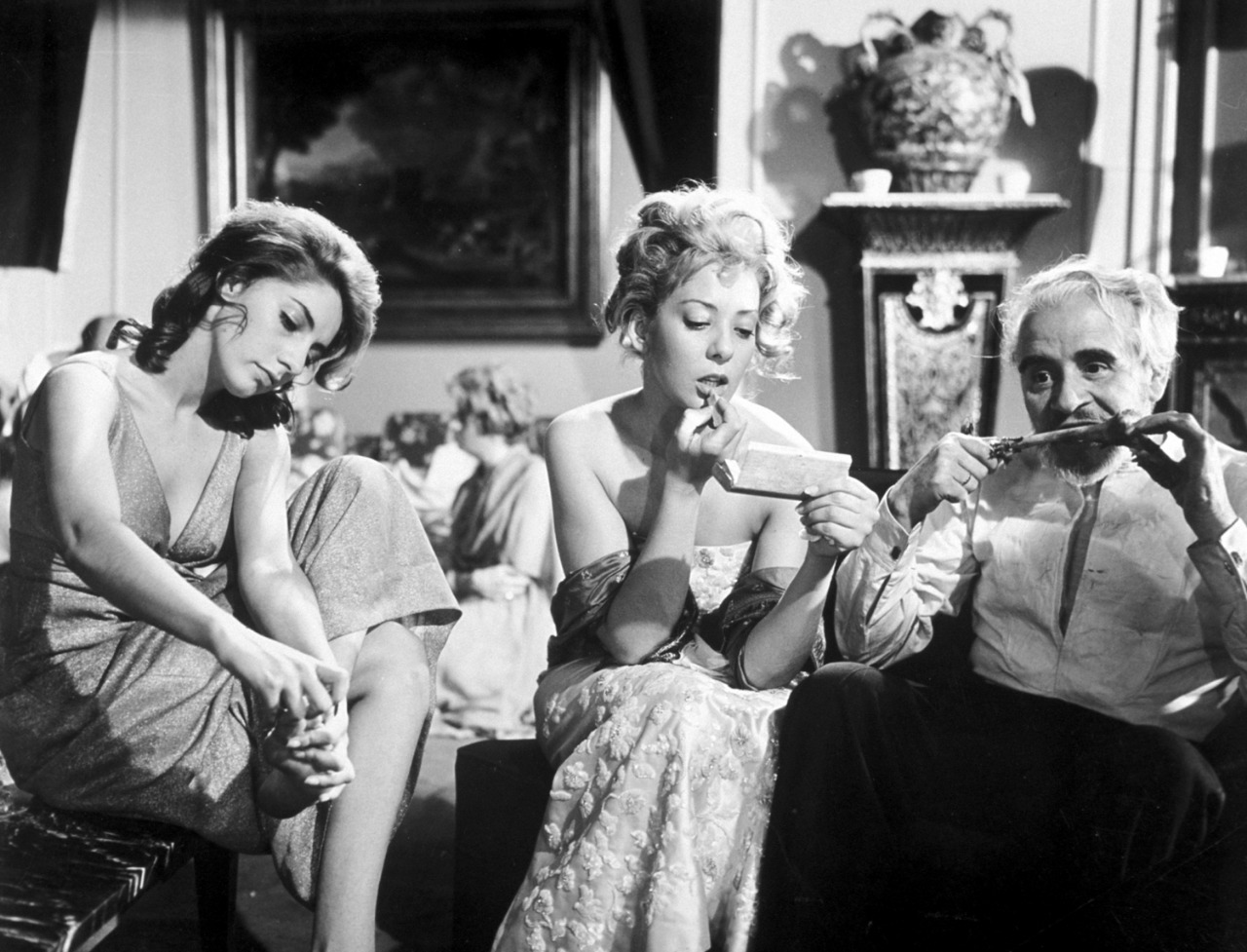
Left to right: Andere, Silvia Pinal and Enrique García Álvarez in El ángel exterminador (1962)

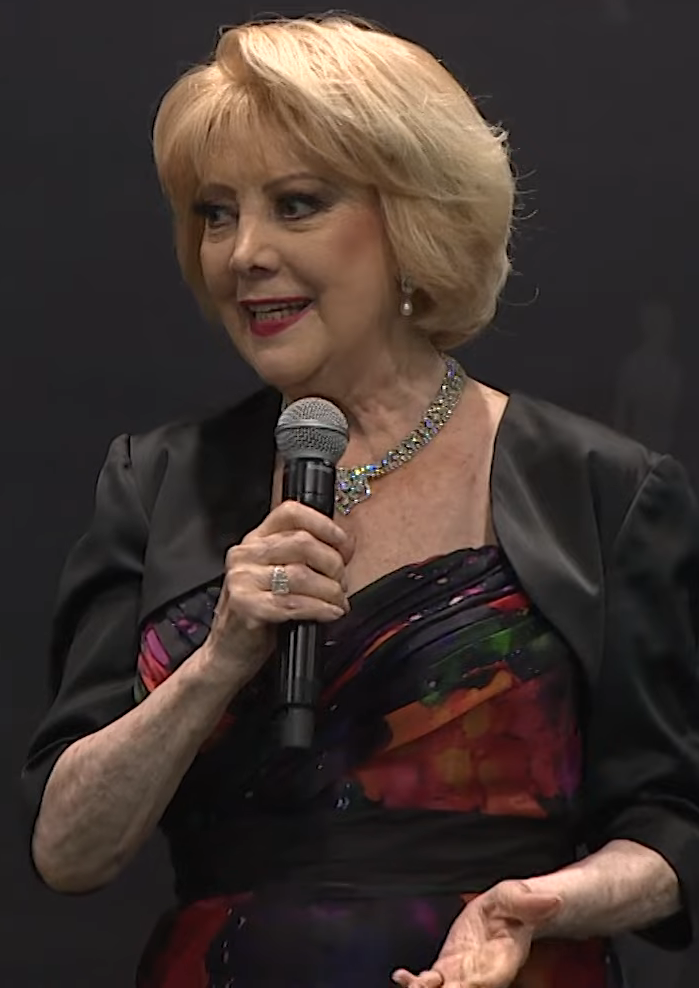
Andere in 2025

Andere was born to a Catholic family in Mexico City on August 20, 1938.

Active since 1959, her appearances in telenovelas began with 1960's Vida por Vida. Two of her major roles as a villainess were in La Madrastra, opposite Victoria Ruffo, and Peregrina. She also starred in Soy Tu Dueña opposite Lucero and Fernando Colunga.

Her daughter Chantal Andere starred with her in the 2002's telenovela La Otra, where Chantal played the younger version of her character. She was chosen as one of the killers in the series Mujeres Asesinas. One of her most famous films was La Casa del Pelícano. She starred as the antagonist in Emilio Larrosa's telenovela Libre para amarte.

== Personal life ==
Andere was married to José María Fernández Unsáin from 1967 to his death in 1997. They had one child, Chantal Andere, also an actress.

== Filmography ==
=== Telenovelas ===
- El Maleficio as Nuria Montes (2023-2024)
- La mexicana y el güero as Matilde Rojas Vda. de Salvatorre (2020-2021)
- Por amar sin ley as Virginia Sánchez Vda. de Ávalos (2018)
- Las Amazonas as Bernarda Castro Vda. de Mendoza (2016)
- Libre para amarte as Amelia Lascurain Vda. de Sotomayor (2013)
- Soy tu dueña as Leonor de Montesinos (2010)
- Amor sin maquillaje as Herself (2007)
- Peregrina as Victoria Contreras Vda. de Alcocer (2005–2006)
- La Madrastra as Alba San Roman (2005)
- La Otra as Bernarda Sáenz Rivas viuda de Guillen (2002)
- Mi Destino Eres Tu as Nuria del Encino de Rivadeneira (2000)
- Serafin as Alma de la Luz (1999)
- Angela as Emilia Santillana Roldán (1998–1999)
- Mi querida Isabel as Clara Riquelme viuda de Marquez (1996–1997)
- Alondra as Verónica Real de Díaz (1995)
- El vuelo del águila as Carmelita Romero Rubio (1994–1995)
- Ángeles blancos as Rocío (1990)
- Nuevo amanecer as Laura (1988)
- El maleficio as Beatriz de Martino (1983)
- Quiéreme siempre as Ana Maria (1981)
- Sandra y Paulina as Sandra/Paulina (1980)
- Pecado de Amor as Paula/Chantal (1978)
- Mañana será otro dia as Mariana (1976)
- Barata de primavera as Leticia (1975)
- Ha llegado una intrusa as Alicia (1974)
- Cartas sin destino as Rosina (1973)
- Vida por vida as María (1970)
- Encrucijada as Wendy Kepler (1970)
- En busca del paraíso (1968)
- Leyendas de México (1968)
- Dicha robada as Ofelia (1967)
- Amor en el desierto (1967)
- Engáñame (1967)
- Corazón salvaje as Aimée Molnar de Duchamp (1966)
- El derecho de nacer as Isabel Cristina (1966)
- La dueña (1966)
- El abismo (1965)
- Alma de mi alma (1965)
- Nuestro barrio (1965)
- La vecindad as Yolanda (1964)
- Gabriela (1964)
- Siempre tuya (1964)
- Agonía de amor (1963)
- Cita con la muerte (1963)
- Eugenia (1963)
- Grandes ilusiones (1963)
- El caminante (1962)
- Encadenada as Laura (1962)
- Janina (1962)
- Las momias de Guanajuato (1962)
- Sor Juana Inés de la Cruz (1962)
- Conflicto (1961)
- La leona (1961)

=== Series ===
- Ahora que no estás (2024) as Doña Mary

=== Movies ===
- 7 Años de Matrimonio as Adriana (2013)
- A propósito de Buñuel as herself (2000)
- La señorita (1993)
- El cabezota (1982)
- los Japoneses no esperan (1977)
- Picardia mexicana (1977)
- La Casa del Pelícano (1976)
- Simon Blanco (1974)
- Separacion matrimonial as Clara (1973)
- Con amor de muerte (1972)
- Cronica de un amor (1972)
- Las_chicas_malas_del_padre_Méndez (1971)
- Los enamorados (1971)
- La gatita (1971)
- Hoy he soñado con Dios (1971)
- El Juego de la guitarra (1971)
- Yesenia as Yesenia (1971)
- Intimidades de una secretaria (1971)
- Nido de fieras (1971)
- En esta cama nadie duerme (1970)
- Puertas del paraíso (1970)
- Trampas de amor (1970)
- Los problemas de mamá (1970)
- Almohada para tres (1969)
- Bestias jóvenes (1969)
- Fallaste corazon (1969)
- La Noche violenta (1969)
- Quinto patio (1969)
- El día de las madres (1968)
- El oficio más antiguo del mundo (1968)
- Tres noches de locura (1968)
- Vuelo 701 (1968)
- Un largo viaje hacia la muerte (1967)
- El zángano (1967)
- El juicio de Arcadio (1965)
- Lola de mi vida (1965)
- El Ángel Exterminador as Alicia (1962)
- El vestido de novia (1959)

=== Theatre ===
- La velocidad del otoño (2025-2026)
- Relaciones Peligrosas (2012)
- Entre Mujeres (2009)
- Carlota Emperatriz (2007-2008)
- El amor no tiene edad (2000-2002)
- Un tranvia llamado deseo (1983)
- Corona de sombra (1977)
- La vidente (1964)

=== Dubbing ===
- Héroes verdaderos (2010) as Josefa Ortiz de Domínguez - Animated film

== Awards and nominations ==
=== TVyNovelas Awards ===
Year	Category	Nominated work	Result
2011	Best Antagonist Actress	Soy tu dueña	Nominated
2006	Best Antagonist Actress	La madrastra	Nominated
2003	Best Antagonist Actress	La otra	Nominated
2003	Best Actress	La otra	Won
1998	Best Actress	Mi querida Isabel	Won
1995	Best Actress	El vuelo del águila	Won
1991	Best Leading Actress	Ángeles blancos	Nominated
1989	Best First Actress	Nuevo amanecer	Won
1984	Best Leading Actress	El maleficio	Nominated

=== Others ===
- "Trayectoria como actriz" (1997).
- "Una vida de telenovela" (2013).
