= Rebeca Iturbide =

Mexican-American actress (1924–2003)

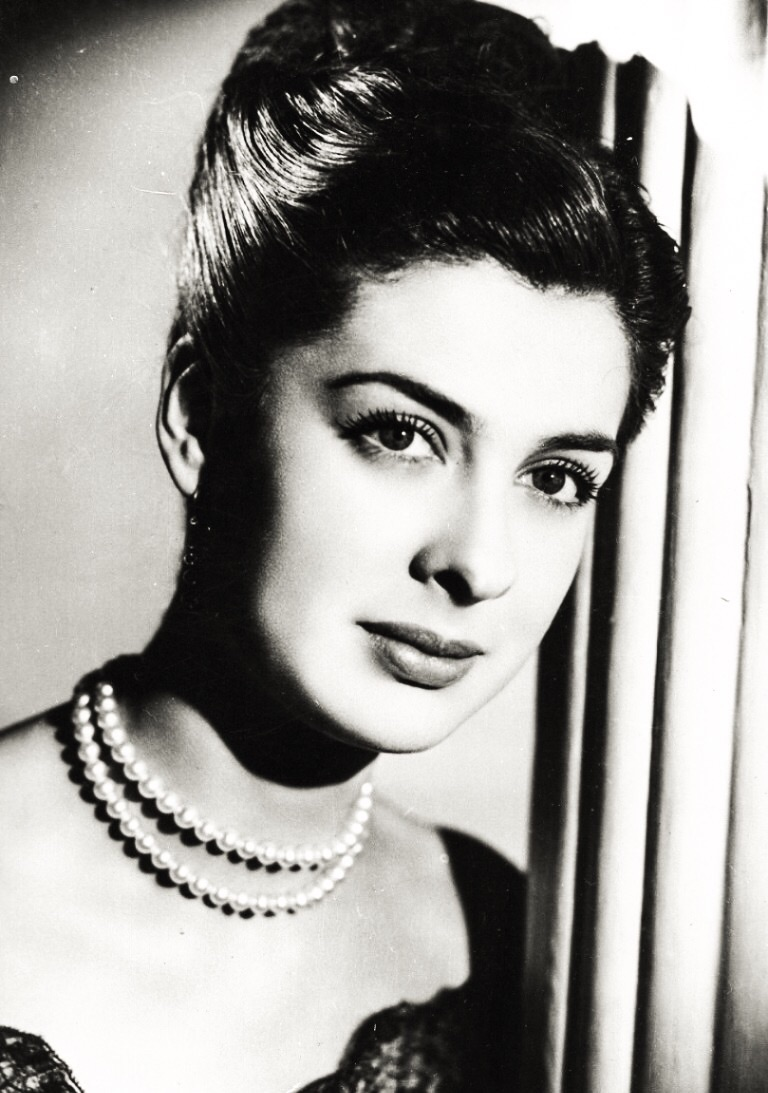
- Born: Rebeca de Iturbide Betancourt; May 21, 1924; El Paso, Texas, U.S.
- Died: April 15, 2003 (aged 78); Mexico City, Mexico
- Occupation: Actress
- Years active: 1951–1976

Rebeca de Iturbide Betancourt (1924–2003) was a Mexican-American actress of the Golden Age of Mexican cinema, who was known for her versatility, being able to play comedy or drama. She was a pioneer in television, playing roles in the mid-1950s. In addition to acting, she also wrote and painted.

== Biography ==
Rebeca de Iturbide Betancourt was born on May 21, 1924, in El Paso, Texas, to Mexican-Jewish parents. In the 1950s, she began working in films. Her first roles were in 1950 in Doña Diabla and La mujer que yo amé. In 1951, she got the opportunity to play opposite Germán Valdés in the film El Revoltoso, which is considered one of his best films. That role led to another joint project with Valdéz, ¡Ay amor... cómo me has puesto!.

She had a reputation for versatility and appeared in adventures, comedies, melodramas and mystery films. Iturbide's most memorable movies included La noche avanza (1951), Mujeres sin mañana (1951), El corazón y la espada (1953), Yo no creo en los hombres (1954), and Furia en el paraíso (1955).

Iturbide was an early performer in television, having her first part in 1955, playing Clare Graham in an episode of Sheena, Queen of the Jungle. In 1965, she practiced her hand at writing and wrote the script for the film, Raíces en el infierno, which was directed by Myron J. Gold.

In 1976 she was in an accident and broke her spine. She retired to the ANDA Casa del Actor (Actor's Home) and lived there for the last twelve years of her life. While there, she painted and in addition to doing exhibits at places like the Modern Art Café at Plaza Loreto, she sold them and used the proceeds to help support the Actor's Home.

Rebeca had four children; three of them with the tennis player Federico Sendel, whom she married in 1943. Their children were: the journalist Virginia Sendel, president of the Michou and Mau Foundation Private Assistance Institution (IAP), which helps Mexican children who have been burned; and twins George and Frederick Sendel; her other son is Eduardo Torres Izabal.

She died on April 15, 2003, in Mexico City, Mexico. At her request, her ashes were scattered in the lake of Patzcuaro in Michoacan.

== Filmography ==
=== Film ===
- The Devil Is a Woman (also known as Doña Diabla) (1950)
- La mujer que yo amé (1950)
- Pecado (1951)
- El revoltoso (1951)
- La noche avanza (1951)
- Women Without Tomorrow (1951)
- Oh Darling! Look What You've Done! (1951)
- The Three Happy Compadres (1952)
- Póker de ases (1952)
- The Sword of Granada (1953)
- El mensaje de la muerte (1953)
- Las infieles (1953)
- El misterio del carro express (1953)
- The Photographer (1953)
- El corazón y la espada (1953)
- Reportaje (1953)
- Momentos de la vida de Martí (1954)
- La mujer que se vendio (1954)
- Los Fernández de Peralvillo (1954)
- Sindicato de telemirones (1954)
- Yo no creo en los hombres (1954)
- Furia en el paraíso (1955)
- Cuatro contra el imperio (1957)
- The Sun Also Rises (1957)
- La justicia del gavilán vengador (1957)
- Locura musical (1958)
- The Last Rebel (1958)
- Música y dinero (1958)
- Locos por la televisión (1958)
- El fin de un imperio (1958)
- Jet Over the Atlantic (1959)
- Milagros de San Martín de Porres (1959)
- Of Love and Desire (1963)
- Raíces en el infierno (1963)
- Historia de un canalla(1963)
- He matado a un hombre (1963)
- Amor de adolescente (1963)
- Yo, el valiente (1964)
- The Empire of Dracula (1967)
- Damiana y los hombres (1967)
- La guerra de las monjas (1970)
- Las cadenas del mal (1970)
- La rebelion de las hijas (1970)
- Los perturbados (1970)
- Ya se quién eres (te he estado observando) (1970)
- El nano: Niñera con bigotes (1971)
- Victoria (1972)
- Los ángeles de la tarde (1972)
- Cabalgando a la luna (1972)
- Juan Armenta, el repatriado (1974)
- Peor que las fieras (1974)
- El buscabullas (1974)
- Un camino al cielo (1974)

=== Television ===
- Sheena, Queen of the Jungle (1955)
- Assignment: Mexico (1956)
- Captain David Grief (1957-1960)
- El abismo (1965)
- Tres vidas distintas (1968)
- Mariana (1968)
- Mañana será otro día" (1976)
