= Estafa de amor =

Estafa de amor may refer to:

- Estafa de amor (1961 TV series), a Mexican telenovela
- Estafa de amor (1968 TV series), a Mexican telenovela
