= The Message of Death =

1953 film by Zacarías Gómez Urquiza

- Directed by: Zacarías Gómez Urquiza
- Written by: Zacarías Gómez Urquiza; Carlos Novi
- Produced by: Gregorio Walerstein
- Starring: Miguel Torruco; Rebeca Iturbide; Elena Julián
- Cinematography: Manuel Gómez Urquiza
- Edited by: Rafael Ceballos
- Music by: Gustavo César Carrión
- Production company: Cinematográfica Filmex
- Release date: 2 May 1953
- Running time: 80 minutes
- Country: Mexico
- Language: Spanish

The Message of Death (Spanish: El mensaje de la muerte) is a 1953 Mexican thriller film directed by Zacarías Gómez Urquiza and starring Miguel Torruco, Rebeca Iturbide and Elena Julián.

== Cast ==
- Miguel Torruco
- Rebeca Iturbide
- Elena Julián
- José María Linares-Rivas
- Maruja Grifell
- Martha Lipuzcoa
- Joaquín García Vargas
- Juan Orraca
- Julián de Meriche
- Pepe Nava
- Manuel Resendiz
- Valente Quintana
- Yolanda Montes
- Matilde Sánchez
- The Nicholas Brothers as Themselves

== Bibliography ==
- María Luisa Amador. Cartelera cinematográfica, 1950-1959. UNAM, 1985.
