= Las abuelas =

Mexican telenovela

- Genre: Telenovela; Romance; Drama
- Starring: Prudencia Grifell; María Teresa Rivas; Irma Lozano
- Country of origin: Mexico
- Original language: Spanish

Production
- Running time: 30 minutes

Original release
- Network: Telesistema Mexicano
- Release: 1965 – 1965

Related
- El abismo; Alma de mi alma

Las abuelas (English title:The grandmothers) is a Mexican telenovela produced by Televisa and transmitted by Telesistema Mexicano.

== Cast ==
- Prudencia Grifell
- María Teresa Rivas
- Irma Lozano
- Jorge del Campo
- Raúl Meraz
- Ofelia Guilmáin
- Maricruz Olivier
- Guillermo Orea
- Magda Guzmán
- Carmen Montejo
- María Conesa
- Amparo Villegas
- Jesús Valero
