= La vecindad =

La vecindad may refer to:

- the setting of El Chavo del Ocho
- La vecindad (telenovela)
