= Luis Bayardo =

Mexican actor

- Born: Luis Jorge Bayardo Ramírez; October 28, 1935 (age 90); Tecolotlan, Jalisco, Mexico
- Occupation: Actor
- Years active: 1960-present

Luis Jorge Bayardo Ramírez (born October 28, 1935) is a Mexican actor.

== Filmography ==
=== Films ===
Year	Title	Role	Notes
1963	Los signos del zodiaco	Pedro Rojo	
1964	Volantín		
1984	Katy, la oruga	Ratón de ciudad	Voice only
1986	Los amores criminales de las vampiras Morales	Ernesto	Television film
1990	El hijo de Lamberto Quintero		
1991	Infamia		
1992	Beltrán		Short film
2011	La brújula la lleva el muerto	Viejo	
2015	One for the Road		

=== Television ===
Year	Title	Role	Notes
1960	Espejo de sombras		Television debut
1960	El juicio de los padres		
1961	Niebla		
1961	La leona		
1962	Sor Juana Inés de la Cruz		
1962	Encadenada		
1962	El caminante		
1963	Agonía de amor	Eduardo	
1964	Juicio de almas		
1965	Llamada urgente		
1966	Nuestro pequeño mundo		
1967	La tormenta	Antonio	
1967	Lágrimas amargas		
1969	El usurero	Javier	
1974	Mundo de juguete		
1979	Los ricos también lloran	Diseñador	
1979	J.J. Juez	Pajarito	
1980	Colorina	Polidoro	
1982	Lo que el cielo no perdona	Lolo	
1984	Principessa		
1987	Quinceañera	Ramón Fernández	
1988-1989	La casa al final de la calle	Roberto Gaytán	
1990	Alcanzar una estrella	Gustavo Rueda	
1991	Alcanzar una estrella II	Gustavo Rueda	
1994	Aquí está la Chilindrina	Padre Luna	Co-lead role. Spin-off from El Chavo del Ocho's character La Chilindrina, portrayed by actress María Antonieta de las Nieves
1994	El vuelo del águila	Francisco I. Madero	
1995	Lazos de amor	Edmundo Sandoval	
1998	Preciosa	Tito Ruiz	
1999	Cuento de Navidad		TV mini-series
2000	Ramona	Padre Sarria	
2000	Mi destino eres tú	Samuel Galindo Betancourt	
2000-2004	Mujer, casos de la vida real	Various roles	4 episodes
2004	Amarte es mi pecado	Don Manolo Tapía	
2004	Hospital el paisa	Lic. Lentón	"No andaba muerto" (season 1, episode 16)
2005	La esposa virgen	Sergio Valdéz	
2006	Amar sin límites	Don Jesús "Chucho" Rivera	
2007	Vecinos	Don Tobías	"Lecciones de piano" (season 2, episode 14)
2007	Amor sin maquillaje		
2008-2009	Mañana es para siempre	Ciro Palafox	80 episodes
2009	Central de abasto	Beto	"Gran amor" (season 1, episode 1)
2009	Hermanos y detectives		Episode: "Tiempos difíciles"
2009-2010	Mar de amor	Juez Moncada	9 episodes
2011	La fuerza del destino	Juez Porfirio	7 episodes
2011-2014	Como dice el dicho	Don Zacarías / Ignacio	2 episodes
2012	Por ella soy Eva	Doctor Pedro Jiménez	"Planta a Santiago" (season 1, episode 58)
2012-2013	Porque el amor manda		21 episodes
2013	Libre para amarte	Virgilio Valencia	Main cast; 107 episodes
2015	Muchacha italiana viene a casarse	Juez	1 episode
2015	Hasta el fin del mundo	Sacerdote	2 episodes
2015-16	Pasión y poder	Humberto Vallado	
2017-18	Sin tu mirada	Toribio Guzmán	

=== Self ===
Year	Title	Role	Notes
2006	Premios TV y novelas 2006	Himself	
2010	Grandes finales de telenovelas	Himself / Ramón Fernández	TV movie documentary

== Dubbing ==
Luis Bayardo is also a voice actor who does Latin Spanish dubs in several films and series.

=== Animation ===
- Timothy Q. Mouse in Dumbo (2nd dub)
- Bernard in The Rescuers
- Bernard in The Rescuers Down Under
- Adult Bambi in Bambi (2nd dub)
- Winnie the Pooh in The Many Adventures of Winnie the Pooh
- Winnie the Pooh (singing voice)in Pooh's Grand Adventure: The Search for Christopher Robin
- Fred Jones in Scooby-Doo, Where Are You!
- Van in Cars
- Van in Cars 2
- Scrooge McDuck in Mickey's Christmas Carol
- Mr. Flaversham in The Great Mouse Detective
- Fflewddur Fflam in The Black Cauldron
- Trigger in Robin Hood
- Prince Lír in The Last Unicorn
- Shinsaku Ban in Metropolis

=== Live Action ===
- Willy Wonka in Willy Wonka and the Chocolate Factory
- Hickory/Tin Man in The Wizard of Oz
- Jerry in Some Like It Hot
- Automan/Otto J. Mann in Automan
- Bob Woodward in All the President's Men
- Don Lockwood in Singin' in the Rain
- Napoleon Bonaparte in Désirée
- "Tony" Newman in The Time Tunnel
- Philip Henslowe in Shakespeare in Love
- Chief Frank Quimby in Inspector Gadget
- Lampie in Pete's Dragon
- Claude Frollo in The Hunchback of Notre Dame
- Latin Spanish voice of Jack Lemmon
- Latin Spanish voice of Frank Sinatra
