= Museo del horror =

1964 film by Rafael Baledón

- Directed by: Rafael Baledón
- Screenplay by: José María Fernández Unsáin
- Story by: José María Fernández Unsáin
- Produced by: Heberto Dávila Guajardo; Jesús Sotomayor Martínez
- Starring: Julio Alemán; Patricia Conde; Joaquín Cordero; Olivia Michel; Sonia Infante
- Cinematography: Raúl Martínez Solares
- Edited by: Carlos Savage
- Music by: Sergio Guerrero
- Production company: Producciones Sotomayor
- Release date: 21 May 1964 (Mexico)
- Running time: 85 minutes
- Country: Mexico
- Language: Spanish

Museo del horror (in English, "Museum of Horror") is a 1964 Mexican mystery thriller horror film directed by Rafael Baledón and starring Julio Alemán, Patricia Conde, Joaquín Cordero, Olivia Michel and Sonia Infante.

== Plot ==
Many women disappear under mysterious circumstances, generating a climate of terror and paranoia in the entire population of a town. All the clues point to the same museum.

== Cast ==
- Julio Alemán as Dr. Raúl
- Patricia Conde as Marta
- Joaquín Cordero as Luis
- Olivia Michel as Norma Ramos
- Carlos López Moctezuma as Professor Abramov
- David Reynoso as Police Chief
- Emma Roldán as Doña Leonor
- Sonia Infante as Sonia
- Armando Soto La Marina as Lencho (as Arturo Soto la Marina "Chicote")
- Julián de Meriche as Police Detective
- Arturo Castro as Gendarme (as Arturo Castro "Bigotón")
- Carlos León as Police Detective
- Guillermo Bravo Sosa as Watchman (uncredited)
- José Dupeyrón as Grave Robber (uncredited)
- Jesús Gómez as Policeman (uncredited)
- Leonor Gómez as Maid (uncredited)
- Vicente Lara as Grave Robber (uncredited)
- José Pardavé as Doctor (uncredited)

== Production ==
The film was influenced by House of Wax. It features stock footage from the 1961 Italian sword-and-sandal film Hercules in the Haunted World.

== Reception ==
Vicente Muñoz Álvarez in Cult Movies 2. Películas para la penumbra said of the film, "Naive in its approach, hasty in its development and clumsy in its outcome, Museo del horror, however, perfectly transmits the spirit of the best pulp literature and B series cinema of the time."
