= El rapto =

El rapto may refer to:

- El rapto (TV series), a 1960 Mexican telenovela
- The Rapture (1954 film), a Mexican drama film
- The Rescue: The Weight of the World, a 2023 political thriller film
- El rapto, a song by Tercer Cielo, from the album En ti
