= Apasionada (Mexican TV series) =

Television series

- Genre: Telenovela
- Country of origin: Mexico
- Original language: Spanish

Original release
- Network: Telesistema Mexicano
- Release: 1964

Apasionada is a Mexican telenovela produced by Televisa for Telesistema Mexicano in 1964.

== Cast ==
- José Gálvez
- Carmen Montejo
- Anita Blanch
- Yolanda Ciani
