= Patricia Conde =

Patricia Conde may refer to:

- Patricia Conde (Spanish actress)
- Patricia Conde (Mexican actress)
