= Eusebia Cosme =

Cuban-American actress (1908–1976)

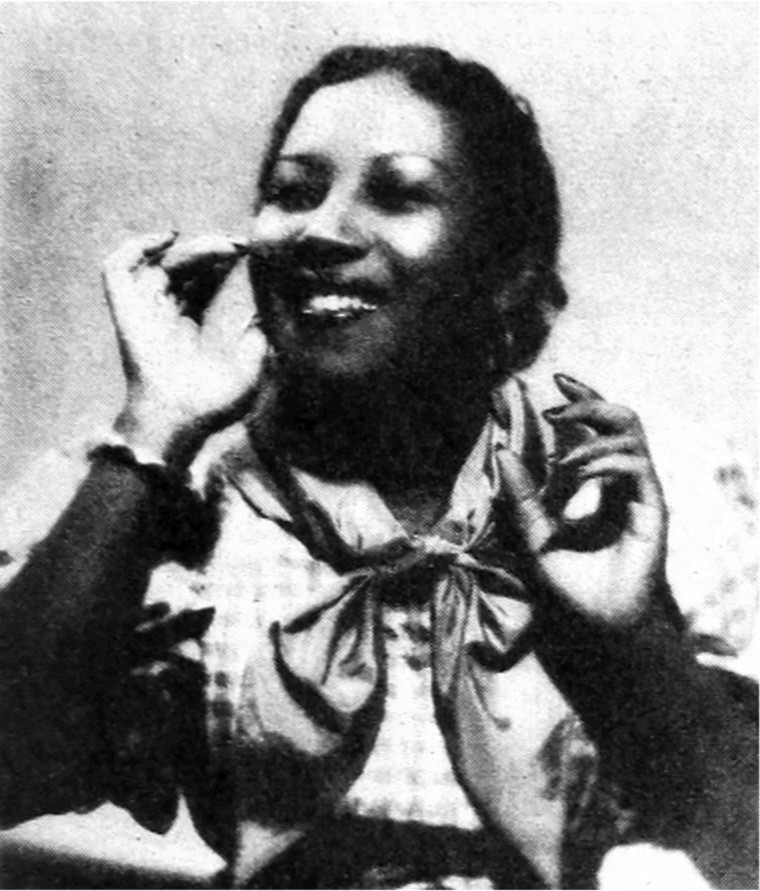
- 1938 photograph from Cine-Mundial
- Born: Eusebia Adriana Cosme Almanza; 5 March 1908; Santiago de Cuba, Cuba
- Died: 11 July 1976 (aged 68); Miami, Florida, US
- Citizenship: Cuba; United States (from 1940s)
- Occupations: Public speaker; actor
- Years active: 1932–1973

Eusebia Cosme Almanza (5 March 1908 – 11 July 1976) was a Cuban poetry reciter and actress who gained widespread fame in the 1930s. Because of racial segregation, Cosme did not pursue an acting career in the traditional Cuban theater, instead focusing on the art of declamation, or poetry reading. She was the sole Cuban woman and one of the few black women to participate in African-themed declamation. Her performances went beyond reciting the poems, as she used gestures, facial expression and vocal rhythm to convey the emotion of the written word. Focusing on works that served as social commentary on race, gender, and the disparity of the position of blacks in both Latin America and the United States, Cosme was recognized as a master of her craft. Beginning her career in variety shows, she performed in Cuba until the late 1930s, before embarking on international tours.

In 1938, Cosme moved to the United States. She became a naturalized US citizen in the 1940s. She performed to sold-out houses at venues including Carnegie Hall, The Town Hall, and historically black universities. She performed with both Marian Anderson and Langston Hughes, and brought the works of African-American poets to Hispanic audiences via The Eusebia Cosme Show, which aired on CBS Radio from 1943 to 1945. She performed recitations in the United States through the late 1950s, worked as an abstract painter in the 1960s, and began acting in film and television in 1964. Cosme lived in Mexico City from 1966 to 1973, when she appeared in such films as The Pawnbroker and White Roses for My Black Sister. Her most noted role was as "Mamá Dolores", which she played repeatedly in her career. She first played this character, from Felix B. Caignet's radio drama El Derecho de nacer (The Right of Birth), in a 1955 stage performance in New York City. She repeated it in both the 1966 film and telenovela by the same name. In 1971 she filmed a spin-off, Mamá Dolores. Her performance in the 1966 film was recognized with the Premio Ónix as best actress.

After suffering a stroke in Mexico City in 1973, Cosme was moved to the United States and lived her final years in Miami. Located in Mexico, her effects were donated to the Schomburg Center for Research in Black Culture at the New York Public Library in Harlem. The archive has become an important resource for academics studying race, gender and social perception of not only Afro-Cubans in her era but also within the wider community of the African diaspora.

== Early life ==
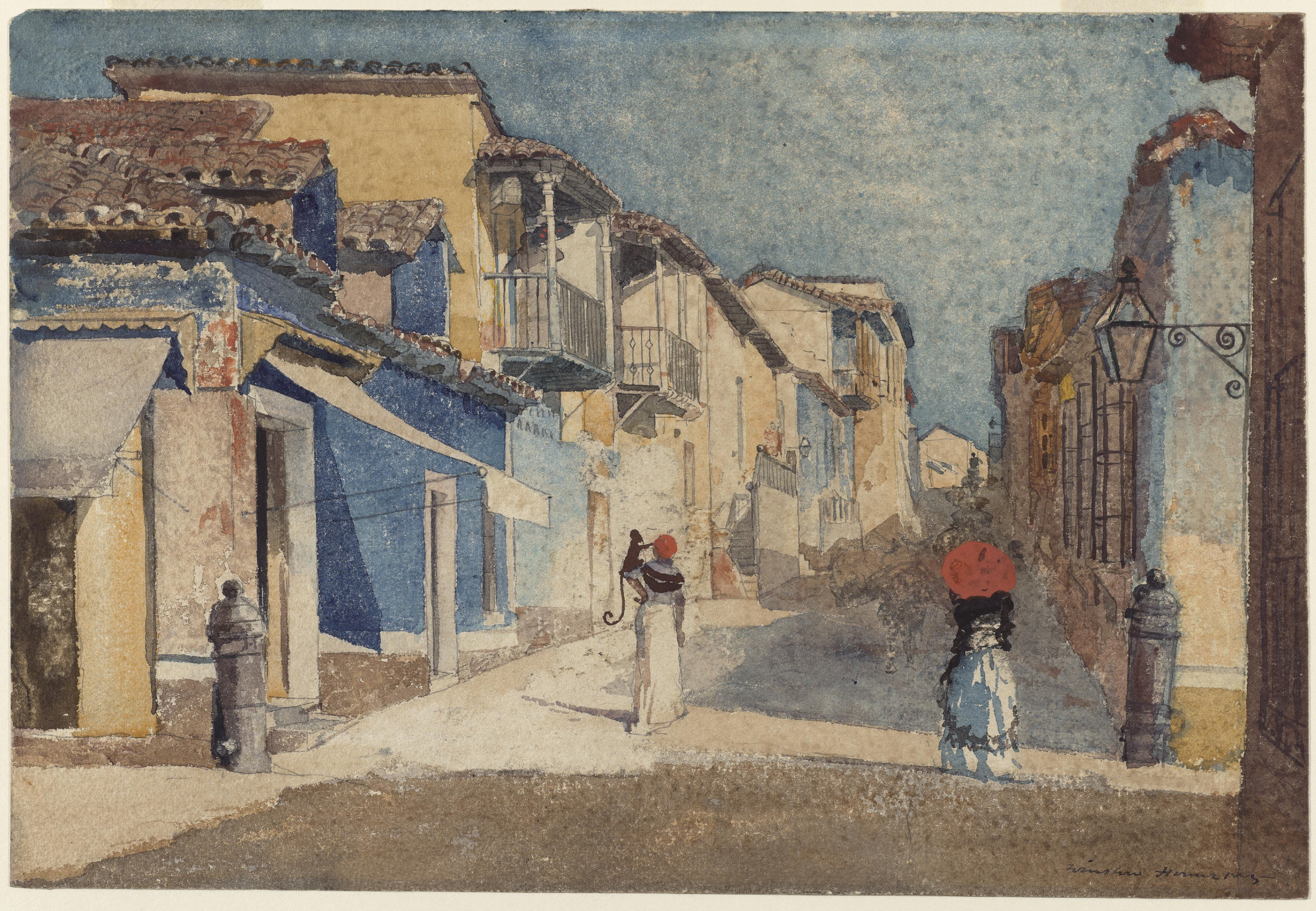
Street Scene, Santiago de Cuba

Eusebia Adriana Cosme Almanza was born on 5 March 1908 (Note: Several sources give her birth date as 5 December 1911 or simply 1911. This information is inconsistent with public record information, her archival information, and her tombstone.) in Santiago de Cuba to Leocadia Almanza and Germán Cosme. Her father served in the Liberation Army Corps during the 1898 Cuban War of Independence, when the island nation gained its independence from Spain. Her mother was a domestic worker on the estate of Luis Fernández Marcané, a prominent local lawyer, who took charge of Cosme's education. From an early age she developed an interest in stage performances, but found there were few non-white performers in the dramatic and comedic theaters she attended. This led Cosme to believe that she would have no future as an actress, or would be offered only stereotypical roles as a servant or rumba performer.

Cosme enjoyed reciting poetry, though she found little affinity with the white writers who produced the works she read. When she discovered Nicolás Guillén's poetry, focused on African subjects and black culture, she found her performance medium. Between 1926 and 1927, she studied at the Conservatorio Municipal de Música de Habana (Municipal Conservatory of Music of Havana), graduating with a diploma. Soon after completing her schooling, Cosme performed as a cupletista in a melodramatic, singing cabaret performance at the Teatro Neptuno. From the late 1920s to early 1930s, she was often listed in playbills as part of the cast of various variety shows. Returning to Santiago, she improved her skill in declamation techniques by performing for the Fernández Marcané household and made her public debut in Santiago in 1930. The household returned to Havana when Fernández Marcané served in the Senate and in 1931, she began lessons in elocution at the Municipal Conservatory's Academy of Declamation studying with Graziella Garbalosa, the academy's director and founder.

Garbalosa encouraged Cosme to develop her individuality and embrace her African roots to distance herself from her white peers by vocalizing and expressing her own cultural background. Through the use of popular dialect and by creating elaborate interpretative routines, with vivid backdrops, props, and flamboyant costumes, Cosme recreated scenes using exaggerated gestures to convey the emotion of the poetry. Her costumes reflected the mood of the piece. If, for example, she was speaking about the struggles of black mothers, she wore a traditional Cuban peasant dress adorned with a kerchief. She also used a typical costume of rumba dancers, a dress featuring a tightly fitted bodice with a deeply ruffled skirt, to set the scene for more rhythmic, celebratory poems. She designed her sets and chose the accompanying music, becoming an artistic director of each performance, rather than simply a performer.

Cosme was trained in the tradition of poseía negra, a specific type of recitation of poetry which is tied to the African experience, with particular attention to the irony of blacks' peculiar societal position in the wake of slavery. Originating in the Antilles, the genre is often synonymous with Afro-Cuban poetry, though there were numerous artists from other islands, such as Puerto Rico. The performance is closely tied to the ethnic and cultural experiences of mulattos (mixed-race people) navigating in a white-dominated culture. The reciters, known as declamadores cubanos or simply recitadores, were predominantly male, with Cosme being the sole exception. Their recitations followed musical rhythms of the danzón and rumba while simultaneously using traditional Spanish verse forms. The movement flourished from the mid-1920s to mid-1930s in the Spanish Caribbean. In the absence of women writers of the period, Cosme recited poems written by men, but her emotional interpretations and performances elevated her to an artistic level beyond simple recitation. She saw her role as an essential bridge between the poet and listener, whereby she recreated the written text as an expression of feeling and consciousness.

== Cuban career ==
Spanish ruffled dress in the style worn by Cosme

When Fernández Marcané and his family moved back to Santiago, Cosme remained in the city and took up residence with an aunt. To pay the rent on her apartment, she took in students from the neighborhood. In 1932, Cosme gave a declamation for a hurricane benefit, appearing on stage with Ignacio Piñeiro. In her first major speaking engagement in Havana on 16 March 1933, Cosme recited a tribute to the Spanish actor, José González Marín at the Payret Theater. By this time, she had developed a standard format, divided into three sections, each featuring five to six declamations, grouped according to their social message and rhythm. In 1934, she performed in Camagüey and then at the Lyceum, a women's organization frequented by white middle- and upper-class women. That summer, she took part in an event sponsored by the Hispano-Cuban Institution of Culture, winning rare praise from the organization's president, Fernando Ortiz. He called her an artist with a finely developed mastery of the aesthetic expression of Cuban culture who moved her audience to tears. She went on to perform in August at the Principal de la Comedia earning praise from Chic Magazine, which dubbed her "the greatest artistic attraction" that month in the capital.

In 1935, she returned to the Principal de la Comedia reciting works by Emilio Ballagas, Regino Boti, Félix B. Caignet, Nicolás Guillén, Luis Palés Matos, and José Antonio Portuondo, among others. Rafael Suárez Solís, the critic for El País declared there were no comparisons for her artistry. A featured article on Cosme in the November 1935 issue of Adelante described her as "black emotion, voice and rhythm, harmoniously vibrating in the flesh and grace of woman". By 1936, Cosme regularly featured in speaking engagements and on radio programs such as CMCG's Hora Sensemayá. She began to appear in more elite venues, like the Casino Español and the Teatro Martí, and joined the Society for the Study of Afro-Cubans. Making her first foray abroad, she performed in Puerto Rico, the Dominican Republic and Haiti, where she earned mostly positive reviews for her performances. She was also praised for sharing works by Ballagas, Guillén and Palés with her audience. As she developed her craft, Cosme expanded her repertoire to include works from other poets of the African diaspora. It took on a more complex continental feel, including works from African-American, Afro-Puerto Rican, and Afro-Venezuelan poets. At the end of the year, when she returned to Cuba, Cosme was honored by the city of her birth in a celebration where she was granted the title Hija Predilecta (Favorite Daughter) of Santiago.

== Immigration and speaking career ==
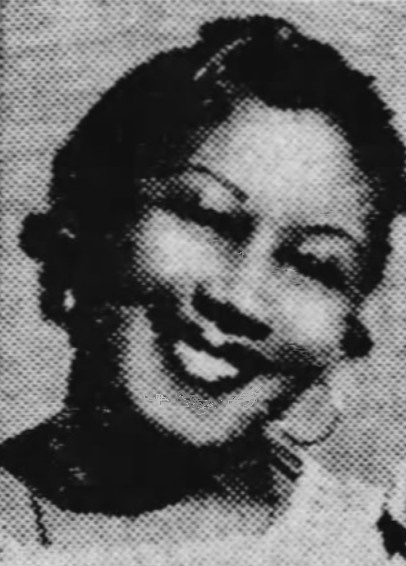
Cosme in 1943

In 1938, Cosme left Cuba for a performance tour in Venezuela, as part of a cultural mission for the Cuban Ministry of Education. She performed in Maracaibo at the Teatro Baralt and later was introduced at the Teatro Nacional in Caracas by Andrés Eloy Blanco. In July, she headed back to the Caribbean to perform at the University of Puerto Rico, in Río Piedras. She appeared in 18 performances over the month and made trips to study Afro-Puerto Rican culture in Loíza Aldea and Machuchal, areas known for their African traditions. While in Puerto Rico, she decided to visit the United States and sailed from San Juan to New York City, arriving on 22 August 1938. Within a month, Cosme was scheduled to appear at Carnegie Hall. She performed on 4 December to a sell-out crowd of more than 3,200 people who paid $6 per ticket (Note: Federal wage laws in the United States established $0.25 per hour as the minimum wage in 1938, making an average earning based upon a 40-hour work week $43.33 per month. Black men in the same time frame earned 41% of white men's wages and black women earned 36% of white wages.) to hear her perform. The tour included performances at Howard and Yale Universities and events in which she opened for Marian Anderson, a noted African-American singer. Cosme focused on themes in her repertoire that spanned the experiences of Afro-Antilleans, from celebrations of culture to suffering and struggling to survive, as well as exploring the stereotypical fears mainstream society had of blacks. She also used her declamations as a way to provoke analysis of racial and gender perceptions of identity. Probably in the early 1940s, she married a white Puerto Rican mechanic, Rafael "Felo" Laviera, from New York.

Cosme appealed to diverse audiences, who each had their own perception of her. Latin American publications categorized her as Afro-Latina; mainstream media in the United States and Europe depicted her as an exotic, tropical personality; while the African-American community saw in her the broad historical connections of the diaspora. Until she arrived in the United States, most of her recitations had been based upon white, Latino authors. After her arrival in New York, she focused on works of black artists and was able to introduce the works of literary figures such as Joseph Seamon Cotter Sr., Paul Laurence Dunbar, and James Weldon Johnson to Hispanic audiences. Her space was unique, as comparison between her and Ethel Barrymore, and other prominent white actresses in both American and Cuban entertainment, failed to recognize that they were not allowed to perform in the same spheres. Additionally, comparison could not be made with African-American actresses, as their cultural experiences were different. As a mulatta and Latina, Cosme could and did perform in cosmopolitan venues featuring her international appeal as a Latin American; similar spaces would not have been open to "Negro", African-American artists. Though she performed in Spanish, she was embraced by the African-American community, with newspapers and reviewers stressing that language was not a barrier. Comparisons were made between opera and her recitations, showing that her mastery of gestures, facial expressions, and rhythm conveyed the message of the performance making words unnecessary.

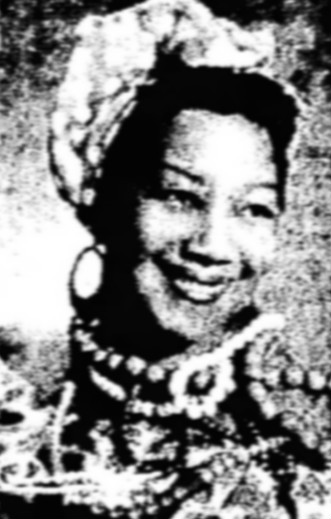
Cosme in 1958

In 1940, she appeared at Northwestern University in a program sponsored by the Institute of Spain in the United States and soon after the performance went to Mexico City to be presented at the Palacio de Bellas Artes. She performed at the Universidad Michoacana de San Nicolás de Hidalgo in Morelia before returning to Sugar Hill in January 1941. She composed the song Fue en el África (It Happened in Africa), which was recorded by RCA Victor featuring Ernesto Roca later that year. She was naturalized as a United States citizen in Laredo, Texas in the early 1940s. In 1942, she again performed at Carnegie Hall and the following year played at The Town Hall. Beginning in 1943, she had her own radio show, The Eusebia Cosme Show, which aired on CBS and was broadcast throughout the Americas on La Cadena de las Américas (Network of the Americas) for the next two years. She had return engagements at Howard University in 1944 and 1946 and at The Town Hall in 1945, where she recited poems by Jesús Colón and Alberto Socarrás in honor of Antonio Maceo's hundredth birthday. In May 1946, Cosme collaborated with Langston Hughes in Cuban Evening: The Poems and Songs of Nicolás Guillén by Katherine Dunham. They recited poetry by Guillén and Eartha Kitt sang at the event. In 1947, she performed at the Club Cubano Inter-Americano in New York City, during the anniversary celebrations of the Grito de Baire.

In another collaboration with Hughes, which included Ben Frederic Carruthers and Arna Bontemps, Cosme performed in 1949 in Carruthers and Hughes' translation of Guillén, which they called Cuba Libre. In 1952, she returned to Cuba for the first time since 1938, taking her husband with her. She was celebrated in her performance at the Universidad de Oriente in her home town, and received the Orden Nacional de Mérito "Carlos Manuel de Céspedes" (Carlos Manuel de Céspedes Order of National Merit). However, she was refused inclusion in the official centennial celebrations planned for José Martí. She was not able to perform in Havana until May 1953, when she was featured at the Pro-Arte Musical Auditorium. She returned to New York, where her husband died by the middle of the decade. In September 1955, she was cast as "Mamá Dolores" in a stage production of Félix B. Caignet's radio drama El Derecho de nacer (The Right of Birth), which played at the Teatro Santurce, located at 1421 5th Avenue, near 116th Street. In 1956, she performed in the Recital de Poesía Afro-Antillana sponsored by the Puerto Rican Society of Journalists and Writers and held at The Town Hall and in 1958, she recited at Fairfield University, winding down her declamatory career.

== Artistic and film career ==
Cosme began to paint and exhibited abstract paintings in such venues as the annual Washington Square Outdoor Art Exhibit through the early 1960s. In 1964, she made her film debut playing in The Pawnbroker with Rod Steiger under the direction of Sidney Lumet, which aired in 1965. Cosme moved to Mexico City in 1966, living at the Hotel Insurgentes. Her film roles there were often stereotypical as domestics or a celibate, aging surrogate mother. She appeared in a film version of El derecho de nacer, reprieving her role as "Mamá Dolores", under the direction of Tito Davison. She was recognized as the "best actress" of 1966 for her role in the film and was awarded the Premio Ónix by the El Instituto y la Escuela de Cultura Cinematográfica at the Universidad Iberoamericana (The Institute and School of Cinematographic Culture of the Ibero-American University), the educational department charged with developing a national film industry in Mexico. The prize was widely acknowledged as a national mark of excellence. Also in 1966, Telesistema Mexicano (TSM) adapted the work for a telenovela of the same name with Cosme again playing "Mamá Dolores", in a production directed by Ernesto Alonso.

In 1968, Cosme appeared in another TSM telenovela Tres vidas distintas (Three Distinct Lives), under the direction of Carlos Salinas and the following year, she starred in Rosas blancas para mi hermana negra (White Roses for My Black Sister) with Libertad Lamarque. In the film, Cosme is killed in a traffic accident and her heart is donated to Lamarque's daughter. In 1971, she worked in the telenovela Cristo negro directed by Tony Carbajal and featured in the movie Vuelo 701 (Flight 701), a thriller in which a series of events prevents some of the passengers from boarding the doomed flight traveling from Acapulco to San Francisco. Davison directed a spin-off of El derecho de nacer in 1971, called Mamá Dolores, in which Cosme starred in the title role. Her last film, El derecho de los pobres (The Rights of the Poor), directed by René Cardona, was released in 1973 and though she was scheduled to make Negro es un bello color (Black is a Beautiful Color) in May 1973, Cosme was debilitated by a stroke and was placed in the American Benevolent Society in Mexico City. A prominent American actor paid for her to have nursing care and eventually arranged for her relocation to the Miami Convalescent Home in South Florida in early 1974.

== Death and legacy ==
Cosme died on 11 July 1976 at Jackson Memorial Hospital in Miami, Florida. She was buried in Flagler Memorial Park's Sunset Mausoleum. Cosme's papers are housed at the Schomburg Center for Research in Black Culture at the New York Public Library in Harlem. The archival material was discovered in Mexico by Eileen Charbo, a writer and researcher who had been affiliated with the Kansas Historical Society. When Cosme was debilitated by a stroke in 1973 she left her effects and papers with the American Benevolent Society. Charbo attempted to have her costumes placed with the Smithsonian, but when they did not express interest, she donated the plain clothing to the Daughters of the American Revolution in Mexico, and contacted Jean Blackwell Hutson to see if the Schomburg Center was interested in the remaining effects. The archive has become an important resource for scholars in evaluating not only Afro-Caribbean identities, but the changing perceptions of the greater African diaspora. In 2013, Nydia Sarabia, a Cuban author, published a biography of Cosme, titled Eusebia Cosme, la rosa canela. In 2015, Cosme was one of the figures celebrated during the 500th anniversary of Santiago de Cuba's founding. An exhibit, prepared by the City Historian from the office of preservation, featured the significant citizens who had influenced the cultural development of the city.
