= El abismo =

Mexican telenovela

- Genre: Telenovela; Romance; Drama
- Directed by: Ernesto Alonso
- Starring: Amparo Rivelles; Guillermo Aguilar; Jacqueline Andere; Héctor Andremar
- Country of origin: Mexico
- Original language: Spanish
- No. of episodes: 59

Production
- Executive producer: Ernesto Alonso
- Running time: 30 minutes

Original release
- Network: Telesistema Mexicano
- Release: 1965 – 1965

Related
- La vecindad; Las abuelas

El abismo (English title:The abyss) is a Mexican telenovela produced by Televisa and transmitted by Telesistema Mexicano.

== Cast ==
- Amparo Rivelles
- Guillermo Aguilar
- Jacqueline Andere
- Héctor Andremar
- Arturo Benavides
- Chela Castro
- Rosario Gálvez
- Aarón Hernán
- Rebeca Iturbide
- Enrique Lizalde
- Miguel Manzano
- Ramiro Portillo
- José G. Villarreal
