= Nuestro pequeño mundo =

Mexican telenovela

- Genre: Telenovela
- Starring: Susana Cabrera; José Gálvez
- Country of origin: Mexico
- Original language: Spanish

Original release
- Network: Telesistema Mexicano
- Release: 1966

Nuestro pequeño mundo (English: Our little world) is a Mexican telenovela produced by Televisa for Telesistema Mexicano in 1966.

== Cast ==
- Susana Cabrera
- José Gálvez
- Carmen Molina
- Andrea Cotto
- Luis Bayardo
- Carlos Ancira
