= El otro (TV series) =

- Genre: Telenovela; Drama
- Starring: Amparo Rivelles; Julio Alemán
- Country of origin: Mexico
- Original language: Spanish
- No. of episodes: 29

Production
- Production locations: Mexico City, Mexico
- Running time: 42-45 minutes
- Production company: Televisa

Original release
- Network: Telesistema Mexicano
- Release: 1960 – 1960

Related
- Mi rival (1973); Por tu amor (1999)

El otro is a Mexican telenovela that aired on Telesistema Mexicano (now Televisa) in 1960, with twenty-nine episodes of thirty minutes duration. Production of Ernesto Alonso. Starring Julio Alemán and Amparo Rivelles.

== Cast ==
- Julio Alemán
- Amparo Rivelles
- Anita Blanch
- Isabelita Blanch
- Eduardo Alcaraz
- Germán Robles
- Olivia Mitchel
- Antonio Raxel

== Production ==
- Original Story: Caridad Bravo Adams
- Adaptation:Caridad Bravo Adams
- Produced: Ernesto Alonso
