= Amor en el desierto =

Mexican telenovela

- Genre: Telenovela
- Created by: Caridad Bravo Adams
- Directed by: Enrique Rambal
- Country of origin: Mexico
- Original language: Spanish

Production
- Producer: Ernesto Alonso

Original release
- Network: Telesistema Mexicano
- Release: 1967

Amor en el desierto, is a Mexican telenovela produced by Televisa and originally transmitted by Telesistema Mexicano.

== Cast ==
- Guillermo Murray as Ahmed
- Jacqueline Andere
- Malena Doria
- Vicky Aguirre
- Fernando Mendoza
- Carlos Fernández
- Graciela Nájera
- Hortensia Santoveña
- Ismael Larumbe
- Jorge Vargas
