= The Faces of the Moon =

- Directed by: Guita Schyfter
- Written by: Hugo Hiriart
- Produced by: Octavio Maya; Guita Schyfter
- Starring: Carola Reyna; Geraldine Chaplin; Ana Torrent; Carmen Montejo; Diana Bracho
- Cinematography: Jaime Reynoso
- Edited by: Carlos Puente
- Music by: Eduardo Gamboa
- Release date: March 8, 2002 (Mar del Plata Film Festival)
- Country: Mexico
- Language: Spanish

The Faces of the Moon (original title: Las caras de la luna) is a 2002 Mexican drama film directed by Guita Schyfter. The film centers upon a group of female jurors at the 3rd Latin American Women's Film Festival in Mexico City. The film reunites Geraldine Chaplin and Ana Torrent, who previously starred as mother and daughter in the Carlos Saura films Cría cuervos (1976) and Elisa, vida mía (1977).

== Plot ==
The female jury, representing the United States, Spain, Uruguay, Costa Rica, Mexico and Argentina interact over their shared experiences. Shosh (Reyna) is an Argentine director that was a political exile in Mexico. Joan (Chaplin) is an American theorist and lesbian activist. Mariana (Montejo) is a pioneer of filmmaking, Julia (Lev) is a former terrorist from Uruguay who was imprisoned for thirteen years. The group complete their duties under the direction of the organizer, Magdalena (Bracho).

== Cast ==
- Carola Reyna as Shosh Balsher
- Geraldine Chaplin as Joan Turner
- Ana Torrent as Maruja Céspedes
- Carmen Montejo as Mariana Toscano
- Diana Bracho as Magdalena Hoyos
- Haydee de Lev as Julia
