= Sandra y Paulina =

Mexican telenovela

- Genre: Telenovela
- Created by: Inés Rodena
- Written by: Luis Reyes de la Maza
- Directed by: Lorenzo de Rodas
- Starring: Jacqueline Andere; Julio Alemán
- Country of origin: Mexico
- Original language: Spanish
- No. of episodes: 115

Production
- Executive producer: Valentín Pimstein
- Running time: 30 minutes

Original release
- Network: Canal de las Estrellas
- Release: 1980

Sandra y Paulina is a Mexican telenovela produced by Valentín Pimstein for Televisa in 1980.

== Cast ==
- Jacqueline Andere as Sandra Antonelli/Paulina
- Julio Alemán as Andrés
- Angélica Aragón as Isabel
- Gaston Tuset as Octavio
- Claudio Brook as El Viejo
- Connie de la Mora as Silvia
- Elizabeth Aguilar as Lulu
- Raúl Meraz as Don Aurelio
- Javier Marc as Daniel
- Juan Verduzco as Ruben
- Maribella García as Regina
- Gustavo Ganem as Marco
- Porfirio Bas as Beto
- Manuel Armenta as Investigator
- Felix Santaella as Rafael
- Alfredo García Marquez as Publicist
- Oscar Narvaez as Agent
- Blas Garcia as Esteban
