= Dos a quererse =

Mexican telenovela

- Genre: Telenovela
- Starring: Chela Castro; Julio Alemán
- Country of origin: Mexico
- Original language: Spanish

Production
- Executive producer: Televisa S.A. de C.V

Original release
- Network: Canal de las Estrellas
- Release: 1977

Related
- Dos a quererse (1963)

Dos a quererse is a Mexican telenovela produced by Televisa S.A. de C.V in 1977. Starring by Chela Castro and Julio Alemán.

Is an adaptation of the Argentine telenovela Dos a quererse produced in 1963.

== Cast ==
- Chela Castro
- Julio Alemán
- Hilda Aguirre
- Rosa Gloria Chagoyán
