= Chícharo (Santurce) =

Subbarrio of Santurce in San Juan, Puerto Rico

Coordinates: 18.4461150°N 66.0593900°W

- Subbarrio
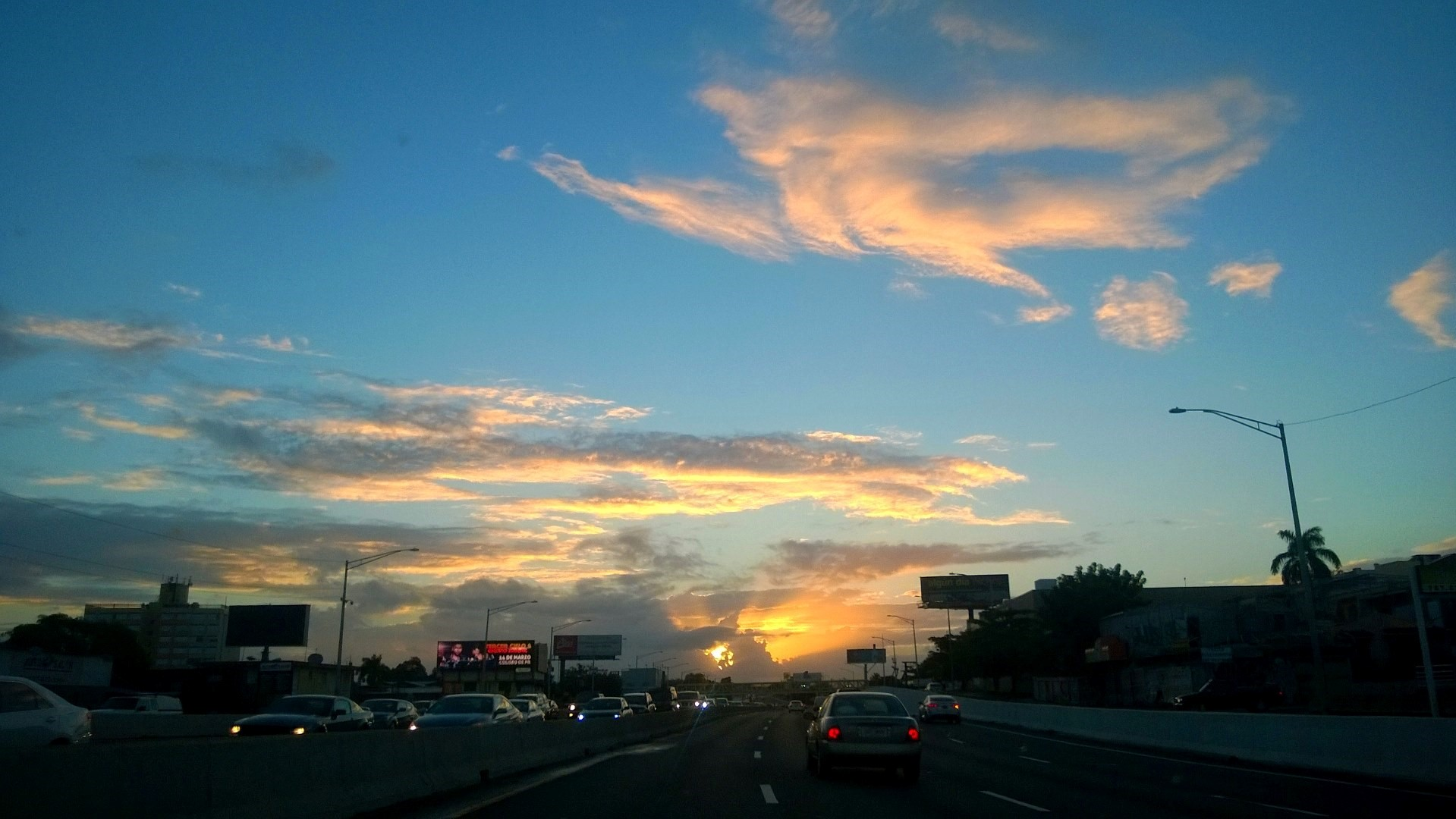
- Puerto Rico Highway 26 between Chícharo and Machuchal

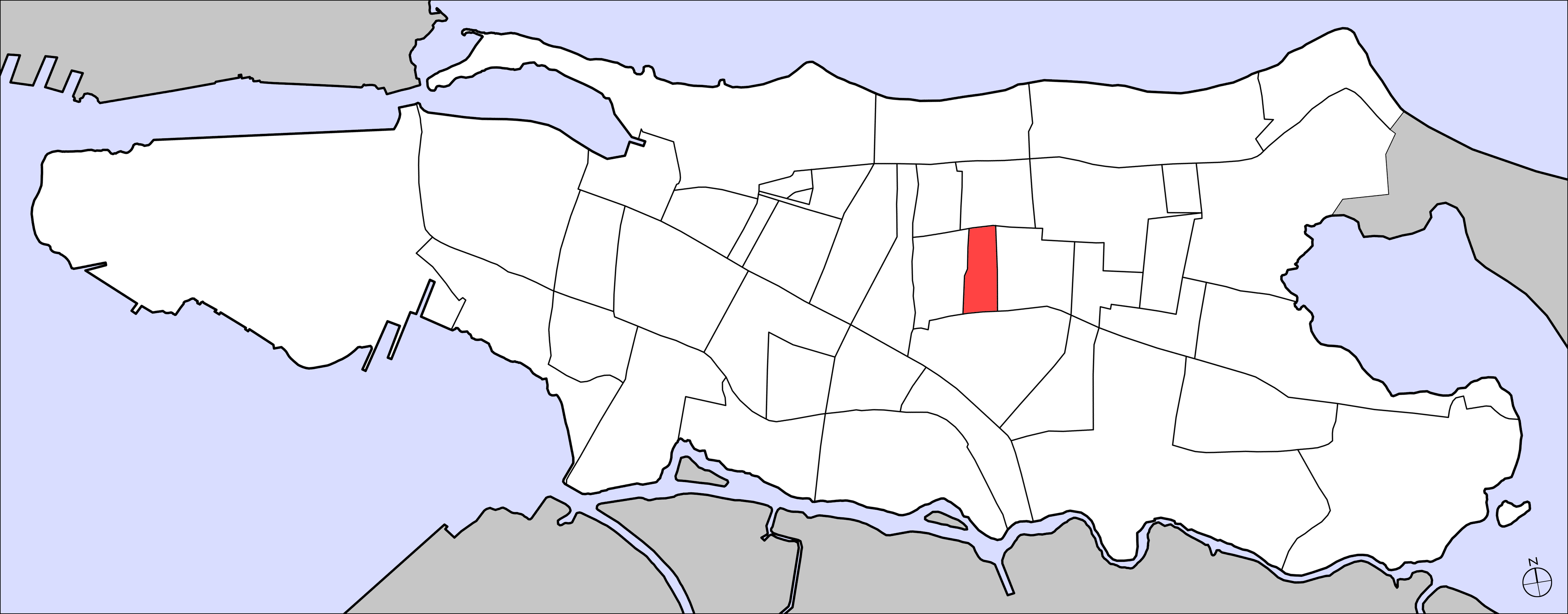
- Commonwealth: Puerto Rico
- Municipality: San Juan
- Barrio: Santurce

Area
  - Total: .03 sq mi (0.078 km^{2})
  - Land: .03 sq mi (0.078 km^{2})
- Elevation: 46 ft (14 m)

Population (2010)
  - Total: 641
  - Density: 21,366.7/sq mi (8,249.7/km^{2})
- Source: 2010 Census
- Time zone: UTC−4 (AST)

Chícharo is one of the forty subbarrios of Santurce, San Juan, Puerto Rico.

== Demographics ==
In 1940, Chícharo had a population of 1,750.

In 2000, Chícharo had a population of 722.

In 2010, Chícharo had a population of 641 and a population density of 21,366.7 persons per square mile.

== See also ==
- List of communities in Puerto Rico
