= Julio Alemán =

Mexican actor (1933–2012)

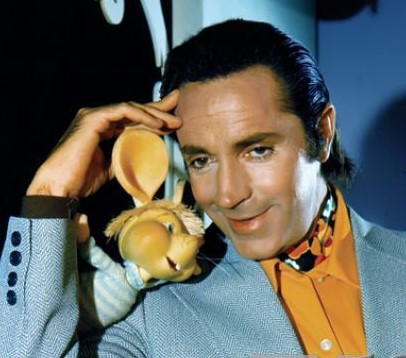
- Alemán as presenter of the Mexican adaptation for the Italian TV show Topo Gigio
- Born: Julio Méndez Alemán; November 29, 1933; Morelia, Michoacán, Mexico
- Died: April 11, 2012 (aged 78); México City, Mexico
- Occupation: Actor
- Years active: 1952–2012

Julio Méndez Alemán (November 29, 1933 – April 11, 2012) was a Mexican actor.

== Biography ==
Alemán was born in Morelia, Michoacán. After studying to be an agronomical engineer, he turned to show business. His first film was El Zarco in 1957. During the late 1960s and early 1970s, he was the MC of the Mexican version of the Italian children's puppet show Topo Gigio.

Alemán appeared in more than 151 films and was elected, for a period, general secretary of the Mexican actors' union, the Asociación Nacional de Actores (National Association of Actors, ANDA). He also served as a federal deputy in the 55th Congress (1991–1994), representing the Federal District's seventh district for the Institutional Revolutionary Party (PRI).

== Death ==
Alemán died in Mexico City on April 11, 2012. He had been diagnosed with lung cancer. His remains were cremated and a memorial service was held on April 12, 2012, in Mexico City.

== Filmography ==
=== Telenovelas ===
- Soy tu dueña as Ernesto Galeana (2010)
- Corazón salvaje as narrator / Judge Pedro Solana (2009-2010)
- Las tontas no van al cielo as Don Arturo Molina (2008)
- Amor sin maquillaje as himself (2007)
- Destilando Amor as Roberto Avellaneda (2007)
- La verdad oculta as Adolfo Avila (2006)
- Mujer de madera as Aarón Santibáñez (2004-2005)
- Amor real as Joaquin Fuentes Guerra (2003)
- Las vías del amor as Don Alberto Betanzos (2002-2003)
- Mi destino eres tú as Augusto Rodriguez Franco (2000)
- Alma rebelde as Diego (1999)
- "Cuento de Navidad" as Severo Rubiales Conde (1999)
- Infamia as Victor Andreu (1981)
- "Sandra y Paulina" as Andres (1980)
- "Dos a quererse" (1977)
- "Pobre Clara" as Cristian De La Huerta (1975)
- "Sacrificio de Mujer" as Miguel Angel (1972)
- "El adorable profesor Aldao" as Mariano Aldao (1971)
- "El Ciego" (1969)
- "Rocambole" (1967)
- "Nuestro barrio" (1965)
- "La Cobarde" (1962)
- "Sor Juana Ines de la Cruz" (1962)
- "El otro" (1960)
- "Senda prohibida" (1958)

=== Films ===
- Tango das mortes (2007)
- Dos bien puestos (2006)
- No hay derecho joven as San Pedro (2006)
- Se les pelo Baltazar (2006)
- Un artista del hambre (2005)
- Emboscada de federales (2003)
- La estampa del escorpion (2002)
- La dama de la Texana (2001)
- Padres culpables as Sebastian (2001)
- Tambien las mujeres pueden (2001)
- Cuando el poder es as Maestro (2000)
- Agarren al de los huevos as Don Aurelio (2000)
- El Tesoro del Pilar (2000)
- Milenio, el principio del fin (2000)
- Venganza contra el reloj (1999)
- Puño de lodo (1999)
- La Fiesta de los perrones (1999)
- La Hijas de Xuchi Paxuchil (1999)
- Si nos dejan (1999)
- Acabame de matar as comandante (1998)
- La Paloma y El Gavilan as Don Artemio (1998)
- Secuestro: Aviso de muerte (1998)
- Veinte años después (1998)
- Mujeres bravas (1998)
- La Banda del mocha orejas (1998)
- Raza indomable (1998)
- Hembras con valor de muerte (1998)
- Bronco (1991)
- La Hora 24 as Pedro de Limantur (1990)
- Funerales del terror (1990)
- Vacaciones de terror as Fernando (1989)
- Mi fantasma y yo (1988)
- Ladron (1988)
- Sabado D.F. (1988)
- La Leyenda del Manco (1987)
- Policia de narcoticos as Mr. de la Parra (1986)
- El Cafre (1986)
- La Carcel de Laredo (1985)
- Prohibido amar en Nueva York (1984)
- Territorio sin ley (1984)
- Pedro el de Guadalajara (1983)
- Los Dos matones (1983)
- El Ahorcado as Regino (1983)
- Inseminacion artificial (1983)
- La Contrabandista (1982)
- Padre por accidente (1981)
- La Agonia del difunto (1981)
- Tiempo para amar (1980)
- Pelea de perros (1980)
- Del otro lado del puente (1980)
- El Cara parchada as Joe (1980)
- El Tren de la muerte as Alvaro Cortes (1979)
- Los Japoneses no esperan (1978)
- Deportados (1977)
- Un Mulato llamado Martin (1975)
- Un Amor extraño (1975)
- Un Camino al cielo (1975)
- Los Valientes de Guerrero (1974)
- Mi amorcito de Suecia as Marcelo (1974)
- Adios, amor as Martin (1973)
- Diamantes, oro y amor (1973)
- El Imponente (1973)
- Mi mesera (1973)
- El Sargento Perez (1973)
- Tampico (1972)
- El Arte de engañar (1972)
- La pequeña señora de Perez (1972)
- Rio salvaje (1971)
- El Idolo (1971)
- En esta cama nadie duerme (1971)
- Los Novios as Antonio Dominguez (1971)
- Los Corrompidos as Martin (1971)
- La Viuda blanca as Martin Duran (1970)
- El Tunco maclovio as El Tunco Maclovio Castro (1970)
- Cruz de amor (1970)
- La muralla verde as Mario (1970)
- Una Mujer para los sabados (1970)
- Como enfriar a mi marido (1970)
- La Trinchera (1969)
- Trampas de amor (1969)
- Préstame a tu mujer (1969)
- Patsy, mi amor as Ricardo (1969)
- Una Noche bajo la tormenta (1969)
- Peligro...! Mujeres en acción as Alex Dinamo (1969)
- Valentin Armienta el vengador (1969)
- La Guerrillera de Villa (1969)
- El Yaqui (1969)
- Las Pirañas aman en Cuaresma as Raul (1969)
- Corazón salvaje as Juan del Diablo (1968)
- Amor perdoname (1968)
- Los Angeles de Puebla as Leonardo Reyes (1968)
- Mujeres, mujeres, mujeres (1967)
- Rocambole contra la secta del escorpion as Rocambole (1967)
- SOS Conspiracion Bikini as Alex Dinamo (1967)
- Rocambole contra las mujeres arpías as Rocambole (1967)
- La Perra as Lucas (1967)
- Mariana (1967)
- The Partisan of Villa as Ricardo Peñalver (1967)
- El derecho de nacer as Alberto Limonta (1966)
- Sangre en Rio Bravo (1966)
- Solo de noche vienes (1966)
- Me ha gustado un hombre (1965)
- Preciosa (1965)
- Los Hijos que yo soñé (1965)
- Mi héroe (1965)
- Diablos en el cielo (1965)
- Napoleoncito (1964)
- Yo, el valiente (1964)
- Los Novios de mis hijas as Lorenzo Robles (1964)
- Historia de un canalla as Julio Benavente (1964)
- Museo del horror (1964)
- Amor y sexo as Raul Solana (1964)
- La Sonrisa de los pobres (1964)
- La Edad de la violencia as Fuentes (1964)
- El Hombre de papel (1963)
- La Diosa impura as Julio (1963)
- La Risa de la ciudad (1963)
- Una joven de 16 años (1963)
- Neutrón contra el Dr. Caronte (1963)
- Cuando los hijos se pierden (1963)
- Me dicen el consentido (1962)
- La Muerte pasa lista (1962)
- Nostradamus, el genio de las tinieblas as Antonio (1962)
- La Barranca sangrienta (1962)
- Locos por la música (1962)
- El Látigo negro contra los farsantes (1962)
- La Venganza del resucitado (1962)
- Los Autómatas de la muerte (1962)
- Los Encapuchados del infierno (1962)
- Nostradamus y el destructor de monstruos as Antonio (1962)
- Neutrón el enmascarado negro as Caronte (1962)
- Nuestros odiosos maridos (1962)
- La Marca del gavilán (1962)
- Juventud sin Dios as Raymundo (1962)
- Con la misma moneda (1961)
- Los Inocentes (1961)
- Los Hermanos Del Hierro as Martin Del Hierro (1961)
- Aventuras del látigo negro (1961)
- La Maldición de Nostradamus as Antonio (1961)
- Los Jovenes as El Gato (1961)
- Tres Romeos y una Julieta (1961)
- Tirando a matar (1961)
- La Sangre de Nostradamus as Antonio (1961)
- Simitrio (1960)
- La cigüeña dijo sí (1960)
- Impaciencia del corazón (1960)
- La Maldición de Nostradamus as Antonio (1960)
- Neutrón, el enmascarado negro (1960)
- La Edad de la tentación (1959)
- Una Abuelita atómica (1958)
- El Zarco (1957)

=== TV series ===
- "Diseñador ambos sexos" as Don Felix Marquez (2001)
- "Club familiar" as host (1989)
- "Jueves Espectaculares" as host (1971)
