= Rosa Nissán =

Mexican writer (born 1939)

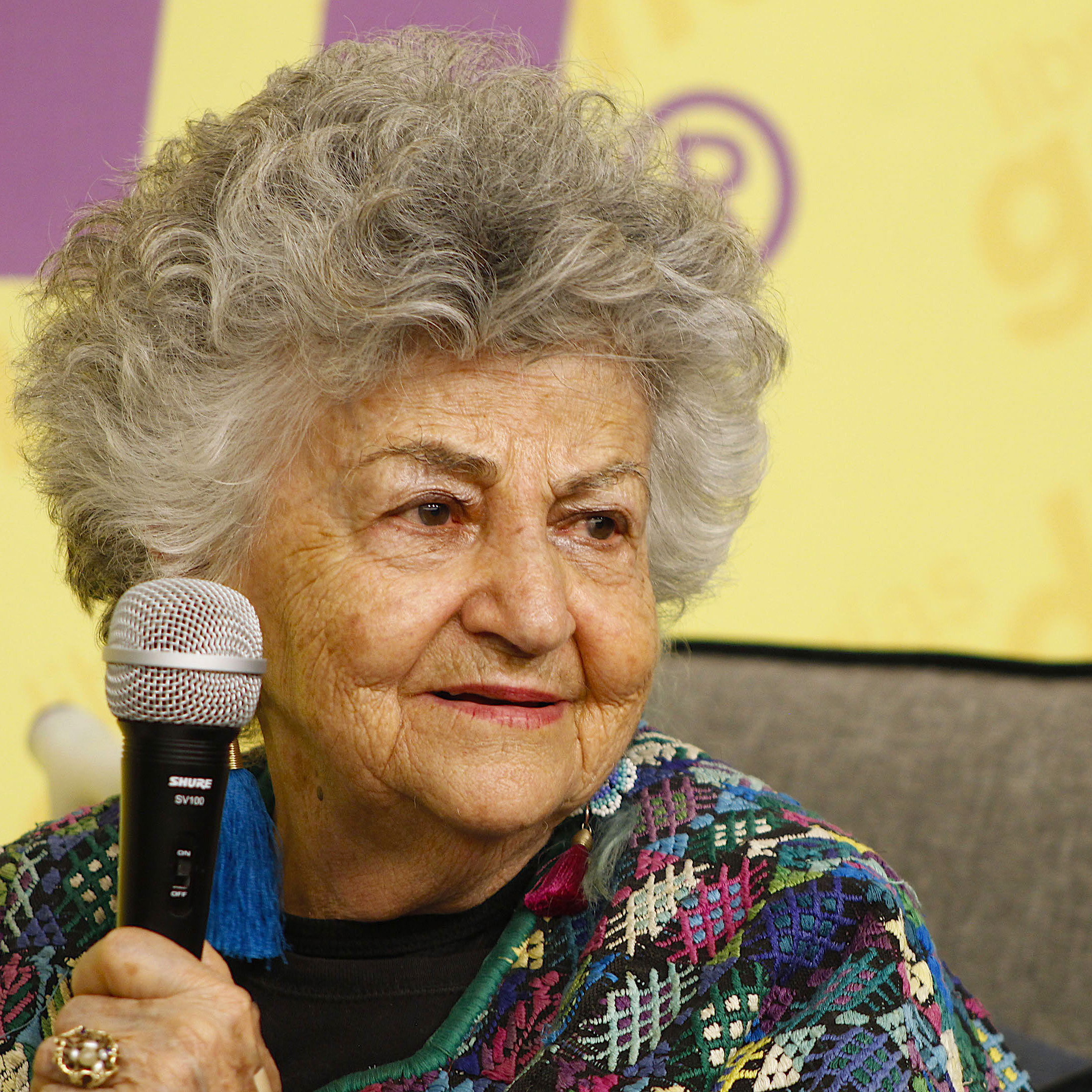
- (2017)
- Born: Rosa Nissán Rovero; 15 June 1939 (age 87); Mexico City, Mexico
- Education: Women's University of Mexico
- Occupation: Writer
- Writing career
- Language: Spanish
- Genre: Novel
- Notable work: Novia que te vea
- Notable awards: Ariel León Dultzin Award

Rosa Nissán Rovero (known as Rosa Nissán; born June 15, 1939) is a Mexican writer of Sephardic origin. She is the author of the novel Novia que te vea (1992), which was made into a movie. She received the Ariel León Dultzin Award, from the Association of Israeli Journalists and Writers in Mexico, in 1994. Her novels focus on the Sephardic Jewish population in Mexico and themes of Jewish womanhood. Her work has been noted for its inclusion of Ladino, commonly spoken by Sephardic Jews.

== Biography ==
Rosa Nissán Rovero was born in Mexico City on June 15, 1939. Her father and grandfather were emigrants from Jerusalem; her mother was a Sephardic Jew from Turkey. She studied journalism at the Women's University of Mexico.

In 1992, she published her first novel Novia que te vea. It was made into a film, produced by Instituto Mexicano de Cinematografía and directed by Guita Schyfter, with a script co-written by Nissan and Hugo Hiriart. The novel addresses the issue of cultural integration of Jewish communities in Mexico and questions the traditional role of Jewish women, as well as the customs and traditions of the Sephardic community.

In 1997, she published a chronicle of her trip to Israel in Las Tierras Prometidas (The Promised Lands). Two years later, her second novel was published, Hisho que te nazca, a continuation of Novia que te vea, and that same year, some short stories were also published in No sólo para dormir es la noche (Not only to sleep is the night), where she brings together a collection of stories in which the problems of partner and loneliness are determining factors.

From 2000 to 2002, she gave various workshops on fictionalized autobiography in the Casa del Lago Juan José Arreola, at the University of the Cloister of Sor Juana. and the Casa del Refugio.

== Selected works ==
- Novia que te vea, 1992, Planeta.
- Hisho que te nazca, 2006, Planeta.
- Las tierras prometidas, 1997, Plaza & Janés.
- No solo para dormir es la noche, 1999, Patria.
- Los viajes de mi cuerpo, 1999, Planeta.
- Me viene un modo de tristeza
