= Hugo Hiriart =

Mexican writer(born April 28, 1942)

- Hugo Hiriart in 2015
- Born: April 28, 1942 (age 84); Mexico city
- Education: National Autonomous University of Mexico
- Occupations: Writer; playwright; scholar
- Spouse: Guita Schyfter
- Children: 2
- Relatives: Fernando Hiriart Balderrama; Humberto Hiriart; Marcia Hiriart; Berta Hiriart
- Writing career
- Notable work: Galaor
- Notable awards: Xavier Villaurrutia Award (1972); National Prize for Arts and Sciences (2009); Fine Arts Medal (2017)

Hugo Hiriart Urdanivia (born April 28, 1942) is a Mexican writer, playwright and scholar.

== Career ==
Hiriart was born in Mexico City on April 28, 1942. His father was Fernando Hiriart Balderrama, a civil servant who was Secretary of Energy and director of Comisión Federal de Electricidad. His brother is congressman Humberto Hiriart and his sisters are academic Marcia Hiriart and writer Berta Hiriart.

He studied at the School of Philosophy and Letters at the National Autonomous University of Mexico (UNAM) and at the Escuela Nacional de Pintura, Escultura y Grabado "La Esmeralda". He has worked as a columnist in several newspapers and magazines, including Excélsior, Letras Libres, Nexos, Unomásuno, Plural, Vuelta, and La Jornada Semanal. His literary work includes novels and essays, and he has written over a dozen plays and screenplays.

He was director of the Mexican Cultural Institute in New York and as cultural attaché at the Mexican Embassy there. He was the director and producer of the Teatro Santa Catarina. He is a professor and researcher at the Universidad Autónoma de la Ciudad de México.

He has been involved in many film projects, mostly in collaboration with Guita Schyfter, his wife.

== Awards and honors ==
In 1972, Hiriart won the Xavier Villaurrutia Award for Galaor, and in 1999, he received the Juan Ruiz de Alarcón National Playwriting Award. He was awarded the Mazatlán Literature Prize (Spanish: Premio Mazatlán de Literatura) in 2011 for El arte de perdurar, and the Sinaloa Letters Prize (Spanish: Premio Letras de Sinaloa) in 2015.

Hiriart was a Guggenheim Foundation Fellow in 1983. He has been a member of the Sistema Nacional de Creadores de Arte since 1994.

In 1994 he received the Ariel Award for Best Screenplay for Novia que no te vea, a film based on the novel by Rosa Nissán. and in 2024 was nominated for Best Adapted Screenplay

In 2009 he was awarded the National Prize for Arts and Sciences in the Linguistics and literature category.

Hiriart became member of the Academia de Artes in October 29, 1992. He was elected a member of the Academia Mexicana de la Lengua on October 25, 2012, to occupy Chair XVIII.

In 2017 he was awarded the Fine Arts Medal.

== Personal life ==
Hiriart is married to director and screenwriter Guita Schyfter. They have 2 children, Sebastián and Ximena, both filmmakers.

== Selected works ==
=== Novels ===
- Galaor (1972)
- Cuadernos de Gofa (1981)
- La destrucción de todas las cosas (1992)
- El águila y el gusano (2014)

=== Essay ===
- Disertación sobre las telarañas (1980)
- Acerca de la naturaleza de los sueños (1995)
- Los dientes eran el piano (1999)
- Discutibles fantasmas

=== Screenplays ===
- Niebla (1979)
- Intimidad (1991)
- Novia que te vea (1994)
- Ámbar (1994)
- Sucesos distantes (1996)
- The Faces of the Moon (Spanish: Las caras de la luna) (2002)
- Huérfanos (2013)
