= Grandes ilusiones =

Mexican telenovela

- Genre: Telenovela
- Country of origin: Mexico
- Original language: Spanish

Original release
- Network: Telesistema Mexicano
- Release: 1963

Grandes ilusiones is a Mexican telenovela produced by Televisa for Telesistema Mexicano in 1963.

== Cast ==
- Héctor Gómez
- Aurora Molina
- Eric del Castillo
- Andrea Cotto
- Miguel Macía
- Jacqueline Andere
- Anita Blanch
- Celia Manzano
- Nicolás Rodríguez
- Guillermo Herrera
