= Gabriela (1964 TV series) =

- Genre: Telenovela
- Country of origin: Mexico
- Original language: Spanish

Original release
- Network: Telesistema Mexicano
- Release: 1964

Gabriela is a Mexican telenovela produced by Televisa for Telesistema Mexicano in 1964.

== Cast ==
- Amparo Rivelles as Gabriela
- Guillermo Aguilar
- Jacqueline Andere
- José Baviera
