= Sor Juana Inés de la Cruz (TV series) =

1962 Mexican telenovela

- Genre: Telenovela
- Creative director: Ernesto Alonso
- Starring: Amparo Rivelles
- Country of origin: Mexico
- Original language: Spanish

Original release
- Network: Telesistema Mexicano
- Release: 1962

Sor Juana Inés de la Cruz is a Mexican telenovela produced by Televisa and broadcast by Telesistema Mexicano in 1962. It is based on the life of Juana Inés de la Cruz.

== Cast ==
- Amparo Rivelles – Juana Inés de la Cruz
- Guillermo Murray – Fabio de los Sonetos
- Julio Alemán
- Augusto Benedico
- Ariadna Welter
- Anita Blanch
- Andrea Palma
- Jacqueline Andere
- José Gálvez
- Manuel Calvo
- Luis Bayardo
- Fernando Mendoza
- Armando Calvo
- Emilia Carranza
- Ada Carrasco
- Malena Doria
