= Vida por vida =

- Genre: Telenovela; Drama
- Starring: Jacqueline Andere; Miguel Manzano
- Country of origin: Mexico
- Original language: Spanish

Production
- Production locations: Mexico City, Mexico
- Running time: 42-45 minutes
- Production company: Televisa

Original release
- Network: Telesistema Mexicano
- Release: 1960 – 1960

Vida por vida is a Mexican telenovela produced by Telesistema Mexicano (now Televisa) in 1960, with episodes of thirty minutes duration. It was directed by Rafael Banquells.

== Plot ==
The story tells of two women vying for the love of a man.

== Cast ==
- Jacqueline Andere as Tula
- Celia Manzano
- Miguel Manzano as Antonio
- Armando Calvo as Dr. Valcourt
- Mónica Serna as Chachita
- Juan Felipe Preciado as Andrés
- Gina Romand
