= El juicio de nuestros hijos =

Mexican telenovela

- Genre: Telenovela
- Created by: Marissa Garrido
- Country of origin: Mexico
- Original language: Spanish

Original release
- Network: Telesistema Mexicano
- Release: 1967

El juicio de nuestros hijos, is a Mexican telenovela produced by Televisa and originally broadcast by Telesistema Mexicano.

== Cast ==
- Carmen Montejo
- Héctor Gómez
- Anita Blanch
- Aarón Hernán
