= Rocambole (Mexican TV series) =

- Genre: Telenovela
- Written by: Raúl Zenteno
- Directed by: Rafael Banquells
- Country of origin: Mexico
- Original language: Spanish
- No. of seasons: 1
- No. of episodes: 75

Production
- Executive producer: Carlos Bravo
- Running time: 30 minutes

Original release
- Network: Telesistema Mexicano
- Release: January 16 – April 28, 1967

Rocambole is a Mexican telenovela produced by Televisa for Telesistema Mexicano in 1967.

== Cast ==
- Julio Alemán
- Elda Peralta
- Germán Robles
- Raúl Meraz
