= Debiera haber obispas =

Mexican telenovela

- Genre: Telenovela
- Country of origin: Mexico
- Original language: Spanish

Original release
- Network: Telesistema Mexicano
- Release: 1964

Debiera haber obispas is a Mexican telenovela produced by Televisa for Telesistema Mexicano in 1964.

== Cast ==
- Anita Blanch
- Maruja Grifell
- Carmen Salas
- Luis Aragón
