= Agonía de amor =

Mexican telenovela

- Genre: Telenovela
- Starring: Jacqueline Andere; José Gálvez
- Country of origin: Mexico
- Original language: Spanish

Original release
- Network: Telesistema Mexicano
- Release: 1963 – 1963

Agonía de amor is a Mexican telenovela produced by Televisa for Telesistema Mexicano in 1963.

== Cast ==
- Jacqueline Andere
- José Gálvez
- Bertha Moss
- Adriana Roel
- Alma Martinez
- Ada Carrasco
- Miguel Macia
- Jorge Mondragón
- Luis Bayardo
- Luz Márquez
