= Nuestro barrio =

Mexican telenovela

- Genre: Telenovela
- Country of origin: Mexico
- Original language: Spanish

Original release
- Network: Telesistema Mexicano
- Release: 1965

Nuestro barrio is a Mexican telenovela produced for Telesistema Mexicano in 1965.

== Cast ==
- Carmen Montejo
- Julio Alemán
- Guillermo Zetina
- Jacqueline Andere
