= The Mystery of the Express Car =

1953 film by Zacarías Gómez Urquiza

- Directed by: Zacarías Gómez Urquiza
- Written by: Zacarías Gómez Urquiza; Carlos Novi
- Produced by: Gregorio Walerstein
- Cinematography: Manuel Gómez Urquiza
- Edited by: Rafael Ceballos
- Music by: Gustavo César Carrión
- Production company: Filmex
- Release date: 22 July 1953
- Country: Mexico
- Language: Spanish

The Mystery of the Express Car (Spanish: El misterio del carro express) is a 1953 Mexican mystery film co-written and directed by Zacarías Gómez Urquiza and starring Miguel Torruco and Rebeca Iturbide.

== Cast ==
- Rogelio Fernández
- Gilberto González
- Rebeca Iturbide
- Elena Julián
- Jorge Martínez de Hoyos
- Yolanda Montes «Tongolele»
- Luis Mussot
- Nicholas Brothers as Themselves
- Pedro Ortega 'El Jaibo'
- Guillermo Portillo Acosta
- Valente Quintana
- Gabriel Ramírez Osante
- Roberto G. Rivera
- Matilde Sánchez
- Miguel Torruco

== Bibliography ==
- María Luisa Amador. Cartelera cinematográfica, 1950-1959. UNAM, 1985.
