= Machuchal (Santurce) =

Subbarrio of Santurce in San Juan, Puerto Rico

- Subbarrio
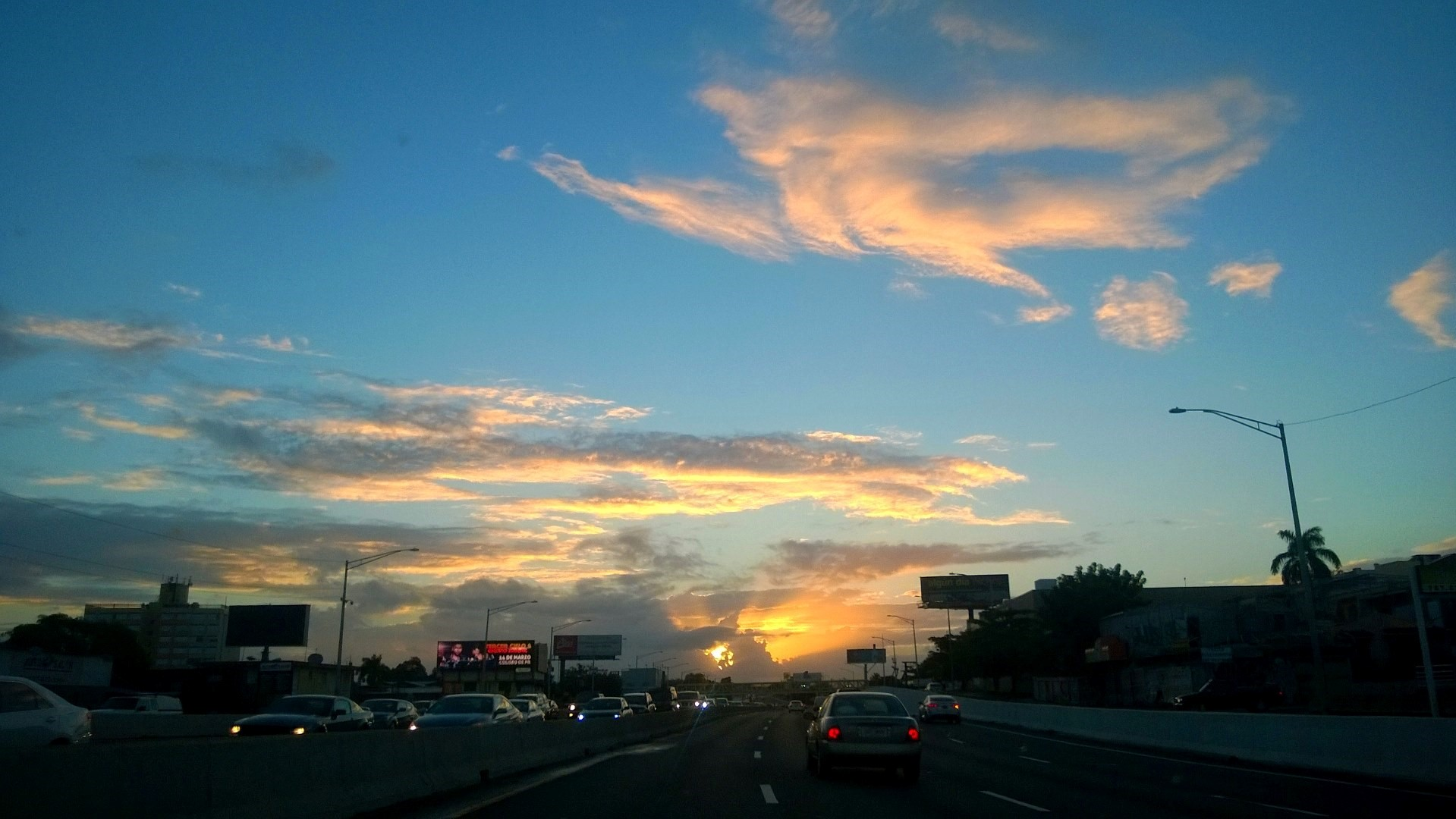
- Puerto Rico Highway 26 between Chícharo and Machuchal

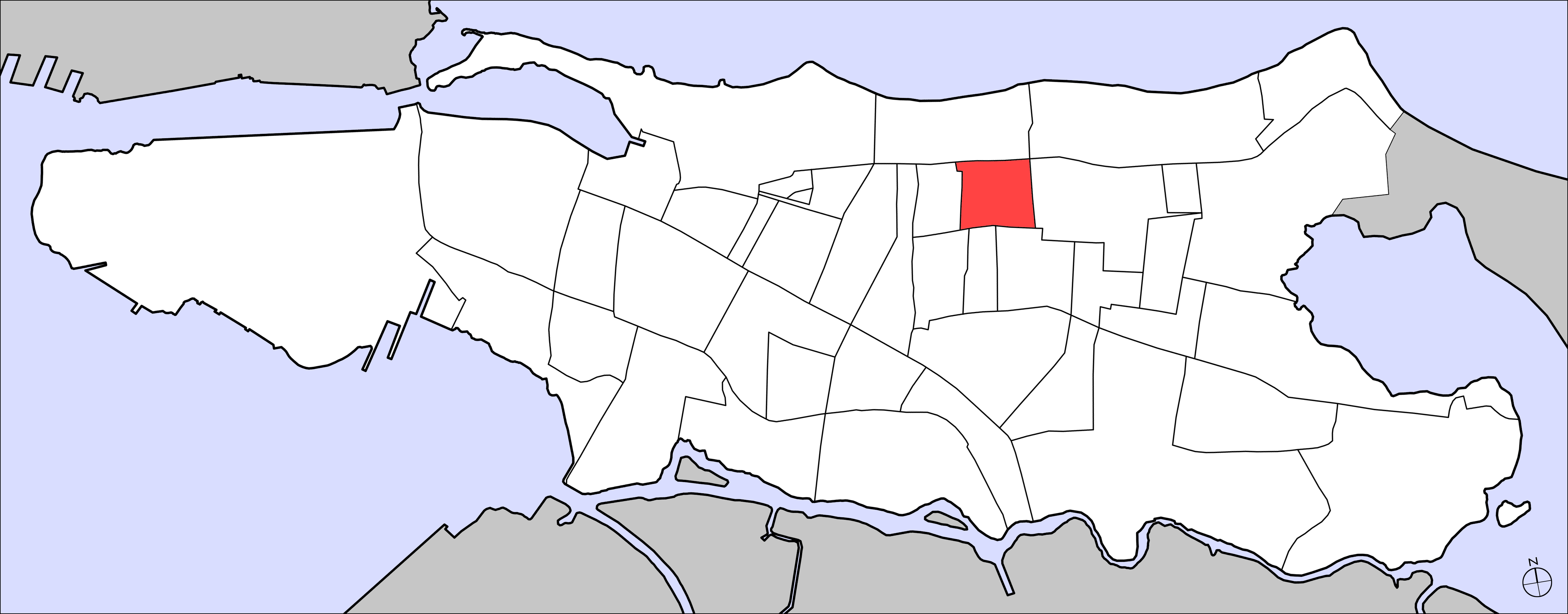
- Machuchal subbarrio
- Commonwealth: Puerto Rico
- Municipality: San Juan
- Barrio: Santurce

Area
  - Total: .05 sq mi (0.13 km^{2})
  - Land: .05 sq mi (0.13 km^{2})
- Elevation: 10 ft (3.0 m)

Population (2010)
  - Total: 1,262
  - Density: 25,240/sq mi (9,750/km^{2})
- Source: 2010 Census
- Time zone: UTC−4 (AST)

Machuchal is one of the forty subbarrios of Santurce, San Juan, Puerto Rico.

== Demographics ==
In 1940, Machuchal had a population of 2,764.

In 2000, Machuchal had a population of 1,212.

In 2010, Machuchal had a population of 1,262 and a population density of 25,240 persons per square mile.

== Cityscape ==
In 2020, residents complained that businesses flourish during the day but crime and vandalism make Machuchal a dangerous and unpleasant place at night.

== See also ==
- List of communities in Puerto Rico
