= Estafa de amor (1961 TV series) =

Mexican telenovela

- Genre: Telenovela; Romance; Drama
- Created by: Caridad Bravo Adams
- Directed by: Ernesto Alonso
- Starring: Amparo Rivelles; Raúl Ramírez; Carmen Montejo; Prudencia Grifell
- Country of origin: Mexico
- Original language: Spanish

Production
- Executive producer: Ernesto Alonso
- Running time: 30 minutes

Original release
- Network: Telesistema Mexicano
- Release: 1961 – 1961

Related
- Estafa de amor (1968); El engaño (1986); Laberintos de pasión (1999)

Estafa de amor (English title:Love Scam) is a Mexican telenovela produced by Ernesto Alonso and transmitted by Telesistema Mexicano.

Amparo Rivelles and Raúl Ramírez starred as protagonists.

== Cast ==
- Amparo Rivelles
- Raúl Ramírez
- Carmen Montejo
- Prudencia Grifell
- Carlos Nieto
- Karina Laverde
- María Antonieta de las Nieves
