= Viento salvaje =

Mexican Western film

- Directed by: Zacarías Gómez Urquiza
- Written by: Antonio Orellana
- Produced by: Víctor Junco
- Starring: Eric del Castillo; Regina Torné; Víctor Junco; Rosalba Brambila
- Cinematography: Agustín Jiménez
- Edited by: Eufemio Rivera
- Music by: Raúl Lavista
- Production company: Estudios Churubusco Azteca S.A.
- Release date: 28 February 1974 (Mexico)
- Running time: 100 minutes
- Country: Mexico
- Language: Spanish

Viento salvaje (English: "Wild Wind") is a 1974 Mexican Western drama film directed by Zacarías Gómez Urquiza and starring Eric del Castillo, Regina Torné, Víctor Junco, and Rosalba Brambila.

== Plot ==
Bandits rob a church and kidnap María (Brambila). Though the parish priest manages to accidentally kill one of bandits, the two surviving bandits, Sam (Víctor Junco) and Brazos (Tito Junco), rape Maria before selling her into sexual slavery at a brothel. There, the prostitute Verónica (Torné) instructs her in her trade.

== Cast ==
- Eric del Castillo as Father Sierra
- Regina Torné as Verónica
- Víctor Junco as Sam
- Rosalba Brambila as María
- Federico Falcón as Pájaro azul
- Lina Montes as Pedro's wife
- Raúl Pérez Prieto
- Araceli Laiseka (as Aracely Layseka)
- Ángel Di Stefani as Father Damián (as Angel De Stefani)
- Tamara Garina as Veronica's Assistant
- Regino Herrera as Matias
- Rina Valdarno
- Jacquelin Junco
- Fernando Pinkus as Ricardo
- Jesús Gómez as Deputy
- Leonor Gómez as Old lady in church
- Víctor Jordán
- Nicolás Jasso
- Marcelo Villamil as Sherriff
- Eduardo Quintana
- Rubén Márquez as Pedro
- José Chávez
- Tito Junco as Brazos
- Gerardo Zepeda as Man in Canteen (uncredited)

== Bibliography ==
- García Riera, Emilio. Historia documental del cine mexicano: 1972–1973. University of Guadalajara, 1992.
