= El rapto (TV series) =

Mexican telenovela

- Genre: Telenovela; Drama
- Starring: Cesareo Quezada; Carmen Montejo
- Country of origin: Mexico
- Original language: Spanish

Production
- Production locations: Mexico City, Mexico
- Running time: 42-45 minutes
- Production company: Televisa

Original release
- Network: Telesistema Mexicano
- Release: 1960 – 1960

El rapto is a Mexican telenovela produced by Telesistema Mexicano in 1960, with episodes of thirty minutes duration. It was directed by Jesús Valero. It starred Cesareo Quezada and René Cardona as the antaogonist. The telenovela had suspense at a certain point.

== Cast ==
- Cesareo Quezada
- Carmen Montejo
- René Cardona
- Andrea Palma
- Luis Manuel Pelayo
