= Mujercitas =

Mexican telenovela

- Genre: Telenovela
- Country of origin: Mexico
- Original language: Spanish

Original release
- Network: Telesistema Mexicano
- Release: 1962

Mujercitas is a Mexican telenovela produced by Televisa for Telesistema Mexicano in 1962.

== Cast ==
- Elsa Cárdenas
- Adriana Roel
- Rafael del Río
- Elizabeth Dupeyrón
- Claudio Brook
