= Yo pecador =

- Directed by: Alfonso Corona Blake
- Written by: José Mojica (novel), Fernando Galiana, adaptation, Eduardo Enrique Rios writer
- Produced by: Óscar J. Brook, Ernesto Enríquez
- Starring: José Mojica, Pedro Geraldo, Libertad Lamarque, Pedro Armendáriz, Christiane Martel
- Cinematography: Jack Draper
- Edited by: Gloria Schoemann
- Music by: Raúl Lavista
- Release date: 12 December 1959
- Running time: 120 minutes
- Country: Mexico
- Language: Spanish

Yo pecador ("I, a sinner") is a 1959 Mexican film. It stars Pedro Geraldo as José Mojica.
