= Alma de mi alma =

Television series

Alma de mi alma (Spanish for "Soul of my soul") is a Mexican 1965 telenovela. Each episode is of duration of 30 minutes. There are 34 episodes.

Gloria Marín played a villain in this telenovela.

== Cast ==
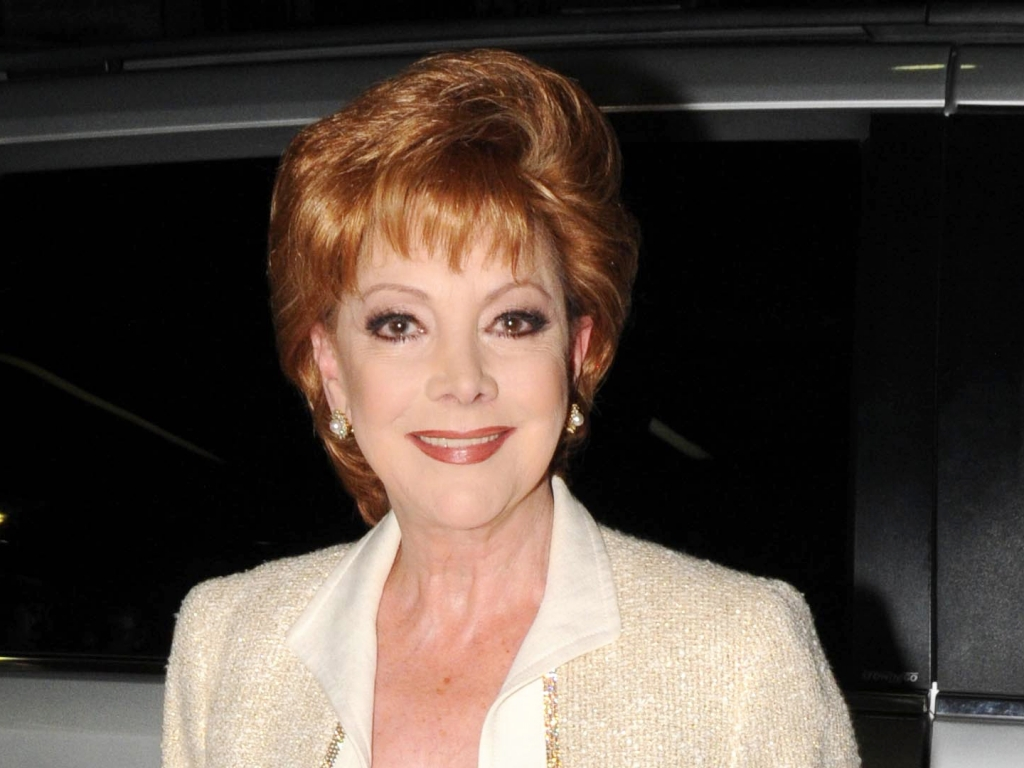
The actress Jacqueline Andere played Alma.

- Gloria Marín — Beatriz
- David Reynoso
- Jacqueline Andere — Alma
- Enrique Álvarez Félix — Alfredo
- Anita Blanch
- Fanny Schiller
- Elizabeth Dupeyrón
- Carlos Amador Jr.
- Manolo Calvo
