= Elizabeth Dupeyrón =

Mexican actress (born 1951)

- Born: January 14, 1950 (age 76); Teapa, Tabasco, Mexico
- Occupation: Actress
- Years active: 1958–present
- Relatives: Humberto Dupeyrón (brother); Natasha Dupeyrón (niece)

Elizabeth Dupeyrón (born January 14, 1950) is a Mexican actress.

Dupeyrón is a sister of actor Humberto Dupeyrón and aunt of actress Natasha Dupeyrón. Began her career as an actress while still a child in the movie El jinete solitario in 1958.

== Filmography ==
Year	Title	Role	Notes
1958	El jinete solitario		
1959	Gutierritos		
1959	Nacida para amar		
1959	Yo pecador		
1960	Macario	Macario's daughter	
1961	Locura de terror		
1962	La edad de la inocencia	Child	
1962	Mujercitas		Special appearance
1963	El terrible gigante de las nieves	Lita Méndez	
1963	Tesoro de mentiras	Martita González	
1963	María Pistolas		
1963	Torero por un día	Lolita	
1965	Alma de mi alma		
1966	María Isabel		Special appearance
1966	El rata		
1967	The Bandits		
1968	Los adolescentes		
1968	Hasta el viento tiene miedo	Josefina	
1968	Operación carambola		
1968	Tres vidas distintas		
1969	The Wild Bunch	Rocío	
1969	La maestra inolvidable	Golondrina (teen)	
1971	The Bridge in the Jungle	Joaquina	
1972	El carruaje	Manuela Juárez	Supporting role
1973	¿Quién?		
1973	Pat Garrett y Billy the Kid		
1974	De sangre chicana		
1974	Mundo de juguete	Silvia	Recurring role
1975	El federal de caminos		
1977/78	Yo no pedí vivir	Irene	Protagonist
1978	Acompáñame	Rita	Supporting role
1978/79	Rosalía		
1979	Erótica		
1979	Tierra sangrienta		
1980	Colorina	Marcia Valdés de Pedres	Supporting role
1982	Déjame vivir	Gilda Echarri	Main Antagonist
1984/85	Te amo	Irene	Supporting role
1985	Esperándote	María José	Special appearance
1986	Cicatrices del alma	Roxana	Recurring role
1987	El rincón de los prodigios		Recurring role
1987	Muerte del federal de caminos		
1988	Dos vidas	Sonia Palas	Co-protagonist
1990/91	Cenizas y diamantes	Nun Fátima	Supporting role
1992	Inventando un crimen		
1993/94	Dos mujeres, un camino	Amalia Núñez de Toruño	Main Antagonist
1996	Cañaveral de pasiones	Socorro Carrasco	Main Antagonist
1998	Gotita de amor	Florencia	Supporting role
1999	Alma rebelde	Pamela	Supporting role
2002	Mujer, casos de la vida real		2 episodes
2002/03	¡Vivan los niños!	Fabiola del Moral	Recurring role
2003/04	Bajo la misma piel	Ángela Quintero	Supporting role
2008	Amor letra por letra	Carmelita	
2008/09	Cuidado con el ángel	Luisa San Román de Maldonado	Recurring role
2009/10	Mar de amor	Mística	Recurring role
2011/12	La que no podía amar	Elsa Villaseñor de Galván	Recurring role
2013/14	Por siempre mi amor	Lidia Oropeza de Alanis	Special appearance
2014	La gata	Carolina	Special appearance
2014	La rosa de Guadalupe	Doña Catalina de Monasterio	1 episode: "Amor, Como Un Sueño"
