= Tres vidas distintas =

Mexican television series

- Genre: Telenovela
- Country of origin: Mexico
- Original language: Spanish

Original release
- Network: Telesistema Mexicano

Tres vidas distintas, is a 1969 Mexican telenovela produced by Televisa and originally transmitted by Telesistema Mexicano.

== Cast ==
- Raúl Boxer
- Eusebia Cosme
- César del Campo
- Elizabeth Dupeyrón
