= Dicha robada =

Mexican telenovela

- Genre: Telenovela
- Country of origin: Mexico
- Original language: Spanish

Original release
- Network: Telesistema Mexicano
- Release: 1967

Dicha robada (English: Stolen Happiness) is a Mexican telenovela produced by Televisa for Telesistema Mexicano in 1967.

== Cast ==
- Carmen Montejo
- Aarón Hernán
- Anita Blanch
- Pilar Sen
