= El derecho de nacer (1966 TV series) =

- Genre: Telenovela
- Country of origin: Mexico
- Original language: Spanish
- No. of episodes: 100

Original release
- Network: Telesistema Mexicano
- Release: 1966 – 1967

El derecho de nacer is a Mexican telenovela produced by Televisa for Telesistema Mexicano in 1966.

== Cast ==
- María Rivas
- Eusebia Cosme
- Enrique Rambal
- Anita Blanch
