= El tesoro de Morgan =

- Directed by: Zacarías Gómez Urquiza
- Written by: Zacarías Gómez Urquiza
- Produced by: Pedro A. Rivera
- Starring: Pilar Bayona; Lorena Velázquez
- Cinematography: Juan Manuel Herrera
- Edited by: Reynaldo P. Portillo
- Music by: Héctor Ulloa
- Production companies: Pedro A. Rivera Films; Producciones Clímax S.A.
- Release date: 1974 (Mexico)
- Running time: 90 minutes
- Country: Mexico
- Language: Spanish

El tesoro de Morgan (English: "The Treasure of Morgan") is a 1974 Mexican adventure film written and directed by Zacarías Gómez Urquiza and starring Pilar Bayona and Lorena Velázquez.

It was filmed in Colombia and Panama.

== Plot ==
A young woman (Pilar Bayona) runs away from school to fulfill her deceased father's wish to find the treasure of the pirate Morgan. But another woman (Lorena Velázquez) and her henchmen will cause her trouble.

== Cast ==
- Pilar Bayona as Magda Rossini
- Agustín Martínez Solares as Julián Llaguno
- Lorena Velázquez as Dalia
- Anita Villalaz as Doña Lucero
- Eduardo Sampson as Private Detective "Chelo" Gómez
- John Bell
- Blanquita Casanova as Mother Superior
- José García de la Torre
- Enrique Jaén as Abusive Husband
- Lincoln Macleod as Black Hunk
- Armando Roblan as Hotel Manager
- Armando Sotomayor as Major's Secretary
- Mireya Uribe as Pregnant Woman
- Alberto Vergara
