= Zacarías Gómez Urquiza =

Mexican film director and screenwriter

- Born: 5 November 1905; Mexico City, Mexico
- Died: 10 September 1982 (aged 76); Mexico City, Mexico
- Occupations: Director, writer
- Years active: 1945–1978 (film)

Zacarías Gómez Urquiza (5 November 1905 – 10 September 1982) was a Mexican film director and screenwriter.

== Selected filmography ==
- Jesusita en Chihuahua (1942)
- Mischievous Susana (1945)
- We Maids (1951)
- The Cry of the Flesh (1951)
- The Masked Tiger (1951)
- The Mystery of the Express Car (1953)
- The Sin of Being a Woman (1955)
- Happiness (1957, co-writer only)
- Northern Courier (1960)
- El tesoro de Morgan (1974)
- Viento salvaje (1974)

== Bibliography ==
- Joanne Hershfield & David R. Maciel. Mexico's Cinema: A Century of Film and Filmmakers. Rowman & Littlefield Publishers, 1999.
