= La vecindad (TV series) =

- Genre: Telenovela
- Country of origin: Mexico
- Original language: Spanish

Original release
- Network: Telesistema Mexicano
- Release: 1964

La vecindad is a Mexican telenovela produced by Televisa for Telesistema Mexicano in 1964.

== Cast ==
- Julissa - Lupe
- Álvaro Zermeño - Juan Antonio
- Jacqueline Andere - Yolanda
- Carmen Salinas - Cuca
- Ofelia Guilmáin - Amalia
- Miguel Manzano - Manuel
- Enrique Álvarez Félix - Jorge
- Emily Cranz - Elena
- Rafael del Río - Gerardo
- Silvia Fournier - Cristina
