= Carmen Montejo =

Cuban actress (1925–2013)

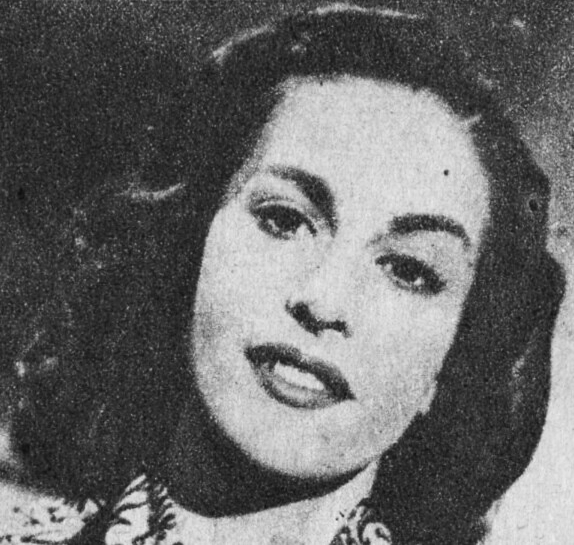
- Montejo in 1945
- Born: María Teresa Sánchez González; May 26, 1925; Pinar del Río, Cuba
- Died: February 25, 2013 (aged 87); Mexico City, Mexico
- Occupation: Actress
- Years active: 1943–2009

Carmen Montejo (born María Teresa Sánchez González; May 26, 1925 – February 25, 2013) was a Cuban and Mexican actress.

== Biography ==
Montejo started her career in radio as a child at the age of 6 in Cuba in a show titled Abuelita Cata transmitted on CMOX. While still in Cuba, she was nicknamed "Muñeca" Sánchez in theatre and because of her golden curls as the Cuban Shirley Temple. She began acting studies in 1939 at Universidad de La Habana under Ludwing Shayovich. After concluding her college studies, her parents offered her a trip to the United States, but instead she chose to go to Mexico for two months.

After arriving in Mexico, she obtained a job in radio claiming to be a famous star in Cuba with a role in the radionovela El diario de Susana Galván. In 1943, she obtained a role in the film Resurrección, directed by Gilberto Martínez Solares, and then Chano Ureta changed her professional name to "Carmen Montejo" when she told him she lived across the Hotel Montejo.

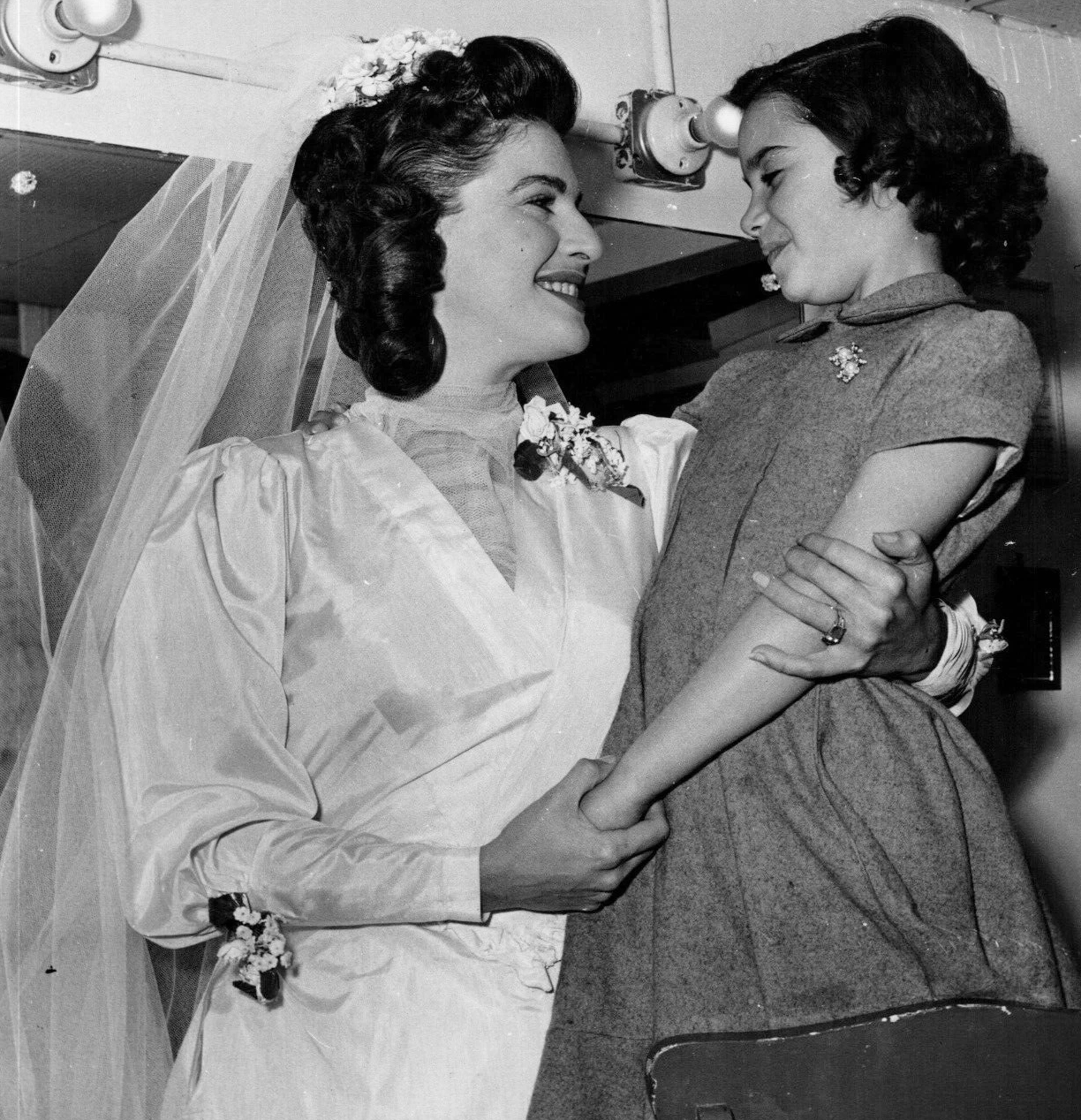
Carmen Montejo and her daughter María Montejo, in 1958

In Venezuela, she participated in one of the first films shot in that country titled Páramo (1954). In theater, she obtained the role of Adela in the 1946 production of The House of Bernarda Alba of Federico García Lorca. She co-starred with Virginia Fábregas and was directed by Ricardo Mondragón at the Palacio de Bellas Artes. She has also participated in Who's Afraid of Virginia Woolf? and The Trojans.

In television, she has performed roles in many telenovelas as well as the sitcom Tres Generaciones with Angélica María and Sasha Sokol in the 1980s.

For her work in television, films and theatre, Montejo was inducted into the Paseo de las Luminarias.

== Death ==
Carmen Montejo died on February 25, 2013, in Mexico City. She was 87.

== Theater ==
- Los Efectos de los Rayos Gamma
- Los Zorros
- Las Troyanas
- Who's Afraid of Virginia Woolf?
- The House of Bernarda Alba (1946)

== Telenovelas ==
- En nombre del amor (2009) as Madeleine Martelli
- Amor sin maquillaje (2007) as Verónica
- Aventuras en el tiempo (2001) as Margarita Rosales de Flores
- Amigos x siempre (2000) as Julia Vidal
- Serafín (voice, 1999) as Gigi
- Te sigo amando (1997)
- Mágica juventud (1992) as Pepita
- Cuna de lobos (1986) as Esperanza Mandujano
- El engaño (1986) as Selene
- El maleficio (1986) as Doña Emilia
- Juana Iris (1985) as María Luisa
- Juventud (1980) as Doña Cuca
- Pecado de amor (1978) as Cristina Otero
- Mundos opuestos (1976) as Antonia
- Paloma (1975) as Gloria
- La tierra (1974) as Cordelia
- La cruz de Marisa Cruses (1970) as Clarita
- La constitución (1970) as Delfina Camacho
- El diario de una señorita decente (1969)
- El retrato de Dorian Gray (1969)
- Dicha robada (1967) as Teresa
- El juicio de nuestros hijos (1967)
- Los medio hogares (1966)
- Nuestro barrio (1965)
- Las abuelas (1965)
- Secreto de confesión (1965)
- Apasionada (1964)
- Destino (1963)
- Doña Macabra (1963)
- Las momias de Guanajuato (1962)
- Estafa de amor (1961)
- La insaciable (1961)
- La casa del odio (1960)
- El rapto (1960)

== Films ==
- Las caras de la luna (2002) as Mariana Toscano
- Corazones rotos aka Broken Hearts (2001) as Doña Fide
- Las caras de la luna (2001)
- Entre la tarde y la noche (1999)
- La casa que arde de noche (1985)
- Ni Chana, ni Juana (1984)
- Burdel (1982)
- El gran triunfo (1981)
- Mamá, soy Paquito (1981) as Sra. Falcon
- La muerte del Palomo (1981)
- En la tormenta (1980)
- En la trampa (1979)
- The Children of Sanchez (1978) as Guadalupe
- Dinastía de la muerte (1977) as Doña Herminia del Fierro
- Prisión de mujeres (1976)
- Coronación (1976) as Abuela
- Renuncia por motivos de salud (1975)
- El rey (1975) as Señora del Rivero
- Presagio (1974)
- El profeta Mimí (1972)
- Los cachorros (1971)
- Doña Macabra (1972)
- La verdadera vocación de Magdalena (1971)
- Los marcados (1970) as Remedios
- Las vírgenes locas (1970)
- La muñeca perversa (1969)
- The Adolescents (1968)
- Aventuras de Juliancito (1968)
- Sor Ye-Ye (1967)
- La recta final (1966)
- El río de las ánimas (1964)
- Los jóvenes (1960)
- El vampiro (1957) as Eloisa
- Dos diablillos en apuros (1957)
- Cara de ángel (1956)
- El túnel seis (1955)
- El plagiario (1955)
- Estafa de amor (1955)
- La sospechosa (1954)
- La infame (1953) as Luisa Barrios de Benet
- Luz en el páramo (1953)
- El potro salvaje (1953)
- Reportaje (1953) as Nurse
- Cuatro horas antes de morir (1953)
- Acuérdate de vivir (1952)
- Misericordia (1952)
- Sister Alegría (1952)
- Women Without Tomorrow (1951) as Marta
- Todos son mis hijos (1951)
- What Has That Woman Done to You? (1951) as Yolanda
- Lodo y armiño (1951)
- Engagement Ring (1951) as Chavela Valdés
- In the Palm of Your Hand (1951) as Clara Stein
- Among Lawyers I See You (1951)
- Monte de piedad (1950)
- Al caer la tarde (1949)
- Secreto entre mujeres (1949)
- Bamba (1948) as Tirsa
- Cita con la muerte (1948)
- Nosotros los Pobres (1948) as Yolanda, la Tísica
- A media luz (1947)
- Crimen en la alcoba (1946)
- Yo fui una usurpadora (1945)
- La señora de enfrente (1945) as Gilberta Madrigales
- Entre hermanos (1945)
- Caminito alegre (1944)
- Camino de los gatos (1943)
- Ave sin nido (1943)
- No matarásl (1943)
- Resurrección (1943)

== Television ==
- Mujer, casos de la vida real (2002, episode "Un viejo amor") as Margarita
- Tres Generaciones (1989)
