= Patricia Conde (Mexican actress) =

Mexican actress

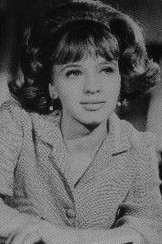
- Born: Patricia Eugenia Gutiérrez Salinas; May 29, 1945 (age 80); Mexico City, Mexico
- Occupation: Actress
- Years active: 1961-1967; 1999-present

Patricia Eugenia Gutiérrez Salinas (born May 29, 1945 in Mexico City), known as Patricia Conde, is a Mexican actress.

== Biography ==
After completing her primary education she took a course in ballet and later enrolled at the Academy of Dramatic Art of the National Association of Actors (ANDA); however, these studies were only a complement to her education and she didn't really think of pursuing acting as a career.

At the end of 1960, Ismael Rodríguez sought a teen actress to play "Jacinta Cárdenas" in the film Los hermanos del hierro, for which he convened a contest. She participated and was selected from a group of over fifty young people, including several professional actresses. Just before the shooting began, she wanted to adopt a stage name and cinematographer Rosalío Solano suggested Patricia Conde. She had a short but successful film career, playing different characters.

In 1964, she married Rodolfo Enrique Serrano Anda, a marriage that lasted fourteen years and produced two children: Patricia and Rodolfo.

Since the late 1990s, she has appeared in some television shows. However, her most memorable roles are those from the 1960s, where she played opposite the best-paid actors, singers, and heartthrobs of the time.

== Filmography ==
- Lo que la vida me robó (2013-2014) .... Madrina
- Amores verdaderos (2012-2013)....Profesora Astudillo
- Rosa Diamante (2012)....Leticia Sotomayor de Montenegro
- Amor bravío (2012)....Netty
- La rosa de Guadalupe (2009-2010)....Episodios: "Miss Narco" como Perla, "Con todo mi amor" como Arcelia y ''Fuera de Peligro'' como Cruz
- "Saturday Night live" (2009)....Ella misma
- Mi Pecado (2009) como La Directora del Orfanato
- Catalina y Sebastián (1999)
- Memoria del cine mexicano (1993)....Ella misma
- El pícaro (1967)....Sara
- Los hijos que yo soñé (1965)
- Los chicos de la noche (1965)
- La juventud se impone (1964)....Pati
- Los novios de mis hijas (1964)....Kay
- Museo de horror (1964)....Marta
- Canción de alma (1964)....Ana
- La sonrisa de los pobres (1964)
- La edad de la violencia (1964)....Nancy
- Dile que la quiero (1963)
- Los bravos de California (1963)
- Paloma herida (1963)....Paloma
- Yo, el mujeriego (1963)....Patricia
- En la vieja California (1963)
- Una joven de 16 años (1963)....Elenita
- Mekishiko mushuku (1962)....Maria Ferrero
- El cielo y la tierra (1962)....Julia
- Cielo rojo (1962)
- Canción de juventud (1962)....Chica
- El caminante (1962)....Flor
- Los hermanos del Hierro (1961)....Jacinta Cárdenas
