= El caminante =

Mexican telenovela

- Genre: Telenovela
- Country of origin: Mexico
- Original language: Spanish

Original release
- Network: Telesistema Mexicano
- Release: 1962

El caminante (English: The Wanderer) is a Mexican telenovela produced by Televisa and broadcast by Telesistema Mexicano in 1962.

== Cast ==
- Luis Bayardo
- Patricia Conde
- Columba Domínguez
- Ariadna Welter
