= List of Televisa telenovelas (1980s) =

The following is a list of telenovelas produced by Televisa in the 1980s.

== 1980 ==
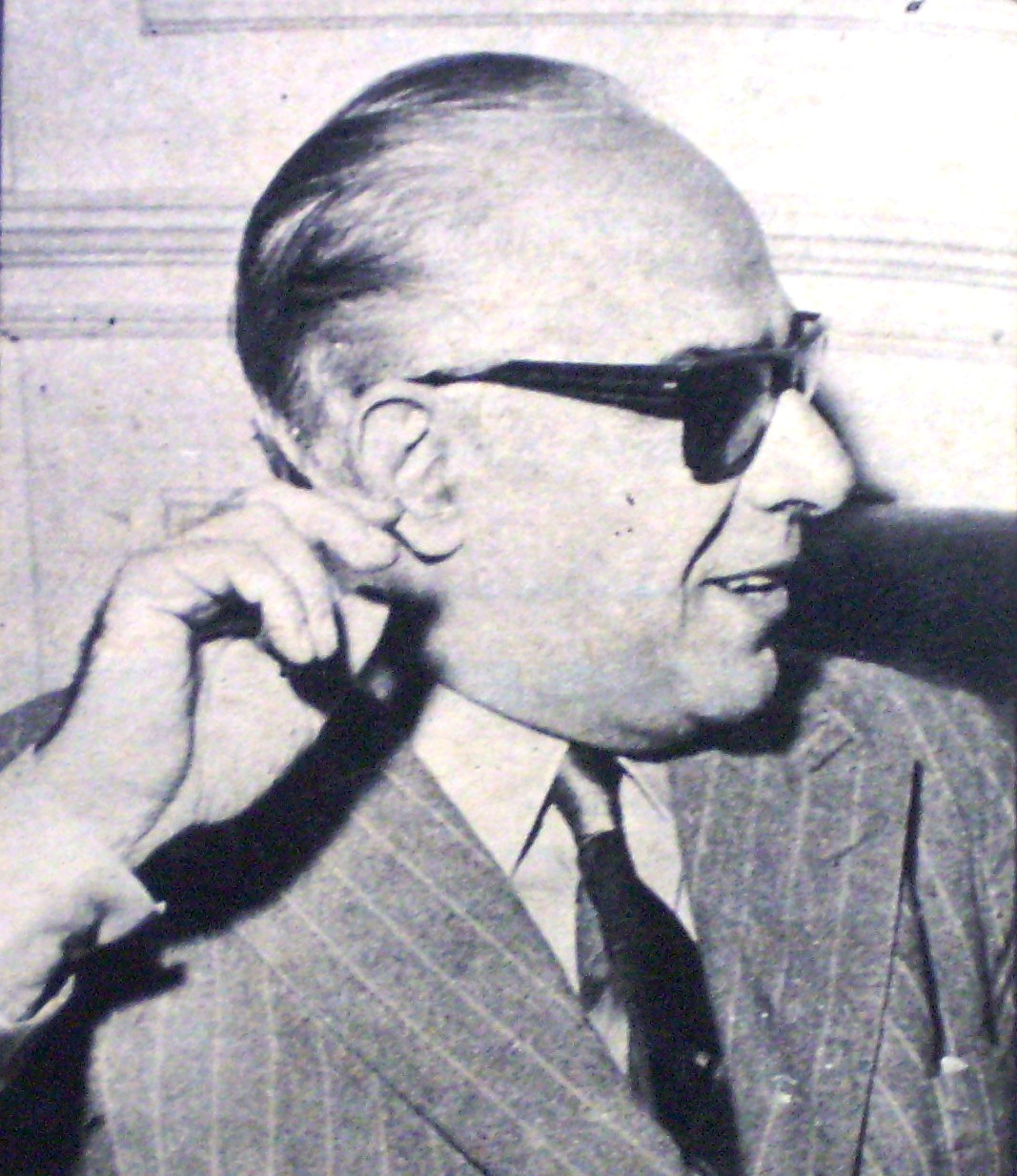
Abel Santacruz wrote several children's telenovelas Carrusel, Mi segunda madre, Guadalupe and Chispita.

#	Year	Title	Author	Director	Ref.
375	1980	Al final del arco iris	María Zarattini	Alfredo Saldaña	
376	1980	Al rojo vivo	María Zarattini	Alfredo Saldaña	
377	1980	Ambición	Inés Rodena	Rafael Banquells	
378	1980	Aprendiendo a amar	Caridad Bravo Adams	Alfredo Saldaña	
379	1980	El árabe	Carlos Olmos	Julio Castillo	
380	1980	Caminemos	Carlos Olmos	Julio Castillo	
381	1980	Cancionera	Norma Herrera	Raúl Araiza	
382	1980	Colorina	Arturo Moya Grau	Valentín Pimstein	
383	1980	El combate	Ignacio López Tarso	Julio Castillo	
384	1980	Conflictos de un médico	Caridad Bravo Adams	Tony Carbajal	
385	1980	Corazones sin rumbo	Silvia Caos	Beatriz Aguirre	
386	1980	Juventud	Kenya Perea	Carlos Zuñiga	
387	1980	Lágrimas de amor	Alicia Rodríguez	Manuel Ruiz Esparza	
388	1980	No temas al amor	Marissa Garrido	Aldo Monti	
389	1980	Pelusita	Ricardo Blume	Manuel Ruiz Esparza	
390	1980	Querer volar	Marissa Garrido	Aldo Monti	
391	1980	Sandra y Paulina	Inés Rodena	Lorenzo de Rodas	
392	1980	Secreto de confesión	Silvia Derbez	Karlos Velázquez	
393	1980	Soledad	Inés Rodena	Rafael Banquells	
394	1980	Verónica	Ricardo Blume	Lorenzo de Rodas	

== 1981 ==
#	Year	Title	Author	Director	Ref.
395	1981	Espejismo	Fanny Cano	Manolo García	
396	1981	Extraños caminos del amor	Fernanda Villeli	Alfredo Saldaña	
397	1981	El hogar que yo robé	Manolo García	Valentín Pimstein	
398	1981	Infamia	Alfonso Cremata	Manolo García	
399	1981	Juegos del destino	Marissa Garrido	Patricia Lozano	
400	1981	Una limosna de amor	Liliana Abud	Rafael Banquells	
401	1981	Nosotras las mujeres	Silvia Derbez	Julio Castillo	
402	1981	Por amor	María Sorté	Ernesto Arreola	
403	1981	Quiéreme siempre	Jacqueline Andere	Ernesto Alonso	
404	1981	Toda una vida	Ofelia Medina	Carlos Zuñiga	
405	1981	El derecho de nacer	Félix Caignet	Ernesto Alonso	

== 1982 ==
#	Year	Title	Author	Director	Ref.
406	1982	El amor nunca muere	Caridad Bravo Adams	Ernesto Alonso	
407	1982	Chispita	Abel Santacruz	Pedro Damián	
408	1982	Déjame vivir	Inés Rodena	Rafael Banquells	
409	1982	En busca del paraíso	Marissa Garrido	Alfredo Saldaña	
410	1982	Gabriel y Gabriela	Yolanda Vargas Dulché	Carlos Téllez	
411	1982	Lo que el cielo no perdona	Alfonso Cremata	Julio Castillo	
412	1982	Mañana es primavera	Juan Gene	Sergio Jiménez	
413	1982	Vanessa	Valentín Pimstein	Raúl Araiza	
414	1982	Vivir enamorada	Nené Cascallar	Carlos Ancira	

== 1983 ==
#	Year	Title	Author	Director	Ref.
415	1983	Amalia Batista	Inés Rodena	Gilberto Marcín	
416	1983	El amor ajeno	Marissa Garrido	Julio Castillo	
417	1983	Bianca Vidal	Inés Rodena	Rafael Banquells	
418	1983	Bodas de odio	Caridad Bravo Adams	Ernesto Alonso	
419	1983	Cuando los hijos se van	Norberto Vieyra	Héctor Bonilla	
420	1983	La fiera	Inés Rodena	Pedro Damián	
421	1983	El maleficio	Fernanda Villeli	Raúl Araiza	
422	1983	Un solo corazón	Germán Robles	Tony Carbajal	

== 1984 ==
#	Year	Title	Author	Director	Ref.
423	1984	Los años felices	Arturo Moya Grau	Valentín Pimstein	
424	1984	Aprendiendo a vivir	Sonia Furió	Rafael Banquells	
425	1984	Eclipse	Silvia Pinal	Julio Castillo	
426	1984	Guadalupe	Abel Santacruz	Rafael Banquells	
427	1984	La pasión de Isabela	Carlos Olmos	Carlos Téllez	
428	1984	Principessa	Nené Cascallar	Pedro Damián	
429	1984	Sí, mi amor	Olga Ruilópez	Enrique Segoviano	
430	1984	Soltero en el aire	Óscar Bonfiglio	Pilar Delgado	
431	1984	Te amo	María Rubio	Enrique Segoviano	
432	1984	La traición	Fernanda Villeli	Raúl Araiza	
433	1984	Tú eres mi destino	María Zarattini	Alfredo Saldaña	

== 1985 ==
#	Year	Title	Author	Director	Ref.
434	1985	Abandonada	Inés Rodena	Rafael Banquells	
435	1985	El ángel caído	Claudio Reyes Rubio	Manolo García	
436	1985	Angélica	Marissa Garrido	Sergio Jiménez	
437	1985	Los años pasan	Inés Rodena	Jorge Sánchez Fogarty	
438	1985	Esperándote	María Antonieta Saavedra	Miguel Córcega	
439	1985	Juana Iris	Ricardo Rentería	Julio Castillo	
440	1985	Tú o nadie	María Zarattini	Ernesto Alonso	
441	1985	Vivir un poco	Arturo Moya Grau	Rafael Banquells	

== 1986 ==
#	Year	Title	Author	Director	Ref.
442	1986	Ave Fénix	Oscar Lada Abot	Enrique Segoviano	
443	1986	El camino secreto	José Rendón	Emilio Larrosa	
444	1986	Cautiva	Francisco Burillo	Manolo García	
445	1986	Cicatrices del alma	Eric Vonn	Eugenio Cobo	
446	1986	Cuna de lobos	Carlos Olmos	Carlos Téllez	
447	1986	De pura sangre	María Zarattini	José Rendón	
448	1986	El engaño	Caridad Bravo Adams	Sergio Jiménez	
449	1986	La gloria y el infierno	Antonio Monsell	Gonzalo Martínez Ortega	
450	1986	Herencia maldita	Caridad Bravo Adams	Sergio Jiménez	
451	1986	Lista negra	Carlos Enrique Taboada	Julio Castillo	
452	1986	Marionetas	Eugenio Cobo	Miguel Córcega	
453	1986	Martín Garatuza	Vicente Riva Palacio	José Caballero	
454	1986	Monte Calvario	Delia Fiallo	Beatriz Sheridan	
455	1986	Muchachita	Ricardo Rentería	Julio Castillo	
456	1986	El padre Gallo	Arturo Moya Grau	Gonzalo Martínez Ortega	
457	1986	Pobre juventud	Carla Estrada	Pedro Damián	
458	1986	Seducción	Enrique Jarnes	Manolo García	

== 1987 ==
#	Year	Title	Author	Director	Ref.
459	1987	Los años perdidos	Alejandro Aragón	Rogelio Guerra	
460	1987	Cómo duele callar	René Muñoz	Miguel Córcega	
461	1987	La indomable	Carlos Romero	Beatriz Sheridan	
462	1987	Pobre señorita Limantour	Inés Rodena	Pedro Damián	
463	1987	El precio de la fama	Marissa Garrido	Sergio Jiménez	
464	1987	Quinceañera	Pedro Damián	Carla Estrada	
465	1987	Rosa salvaje	Inés Rodena	Beatriz Sheridan	
466	1987	Senda de gloria	Eduardo Lizalde	Raúl Araiza	
467	1987	Tal como somos	Carlos Olmos	Julissa	
468	1987	Tiempo de amar	Alberto Cura	Rafael Banquells	
469	1987	Victoria	Alfredo Gurrola	Ernesto Alonso	
470	1987	Yesenia	Yolanda Vargas Dulché	Julio Castillo	

== 1988 ==
#	Year	Title	Author	Director	Ref.
471	1988	Amor en silencio	Eric Vonn	Miguel Córcega	
472	1988	Dos vidas	Janete Clair	Eugenio Cobo	
473	1988	Dulce desafío	Eugenio Cobo	Arturo Ripstein	
474	1988	Encadenados	Marissa Garrido	Julio Castillo	
475	1988	El extraño retorno de Diana Salazar	Lucía Méndez	Carlos Téllez	
476	1988	Flor y canela	Benito Pérez Galdós	Eugenio Cobo	
477	1988	Nuevo amanecer	Fernanda Villeli	Ernesto Alonso	
478	1988	Pasión y poder	Marissa Garrido	Carlos Sotomayor	
479	1988	El pecado de Oyuki	Yolanda Vargas Dulché	Benjamín Cann	
480	1988	El rincón de los prodigios	Carlos Olmos	Lorenzo de Rodas	
481	1988	La trampa	Inés Rodena	Ernesto Alonso	

== 1989 ==
#	Year	Title	Author	Director	Ref.
482	1989	Lo blanco y lo negro	Fernanda Villeli	Julio Castillo	
483	1989	Carrusel	Abel Santacruz	Pedro Damián	
484	1989	La casa al final de la calle	Juan Osorio Ortiz	Jorge Fons	
485	1989	El cristal empañado	Héctor Iglesias	José Rendón	
486	1989	Las grandes aguas	Luis Spota	Juan Carlos Muñoz	
487	1989	Luz y sombra	Paulino Sabugal	Gonzalo Martínez Ortega	
488	1989	Mi segunda madre	Abel Santacruz	Miguel Córcega	
489	1989	Morir para vivir	Félix B. Caignet	Benjamín Cann	
490	1989	Simplemente María	Celia Alcántara	Beatriz Sheridan	
491	1989	Teresa	Mimí Bechelani	Antonio Serrano	
492	1989	Cuando llega el amor	René Muñoz	Miguel Córcega	
493		Un rostro en mi pasado	Fernanda Villeli	Alfredo Gurrola	
