= 5th TVyNovelas Awards =

1987 Mexican TV awards

- Date: 1987
- Location: Centro Libanés, Mexico City, Mexico D.F.
- Hosted by: Raúl Velasco & Gloria Calzada

Highlights
- Most awards: Cuna de lobos (7)
- Most nominations: Cuna de lobos (11)

Television/radio coverage
- Network: Canal de las Estrellas

The 5th TVyNovelas Awards were an academy of special awards to the best soap operas and TV shows. The awards ceremony took place in 1987 in Centro Libanés, Mexico City, Mexico D.F. The ceremony was televised in Mexico by Canal de las Estrellas.

Raúl Velasco and Gloria Calzada hosted the show. Cuna de lobos won 7 awards, the most for the evening, including Best Telenovela. Other winners El camino secreto, La gloria y el infierno and Pobre juventud won 2 awards, while La indomable and Monte Calvario won 1 each.

== Summary of awards and nominations ==
Telenovela	Nominations	Awards
Cuna de lobos	11	7
La gloria y el infierno	9	2
El camino secreto	8	2
Pobre juventud	4	2
Monte Calvario	3	1
Ave fénix	3	0
La indomable	2	1
Yesenia	1	0

== Winners and nominees ==
=== Telenovelas ===
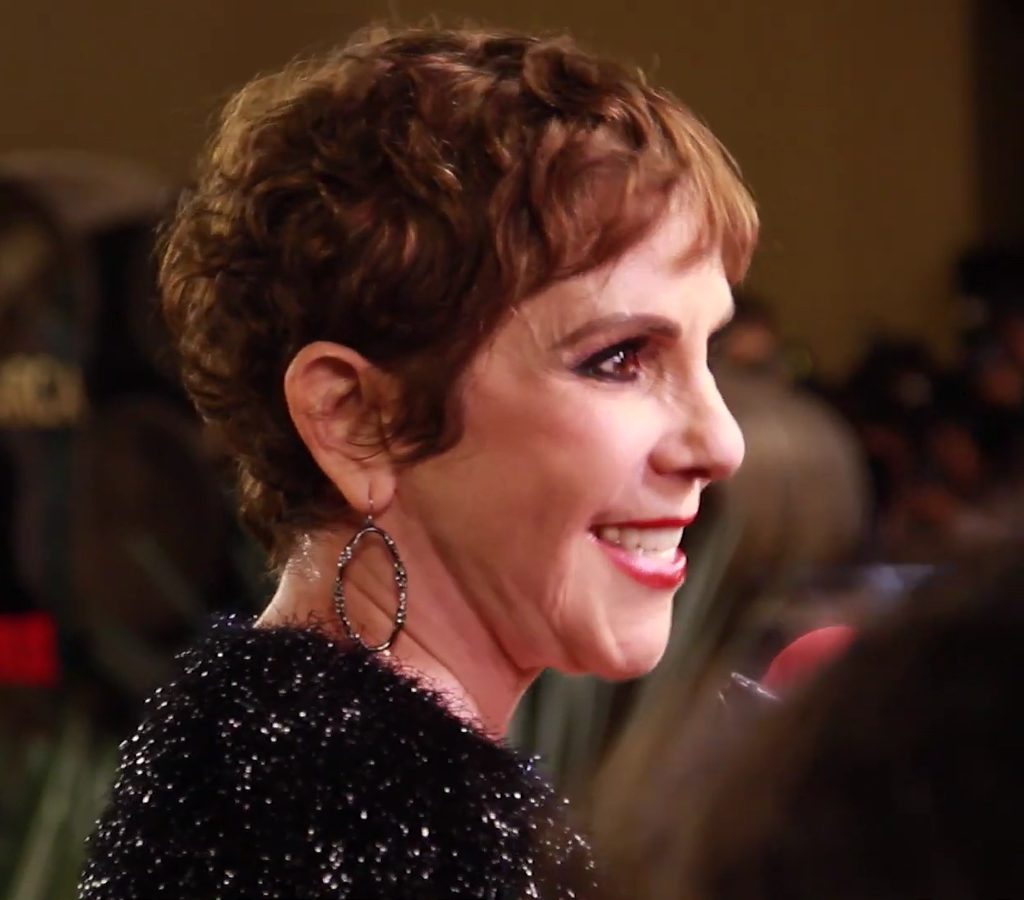
Rebecca Jones, winner for Best Actress.

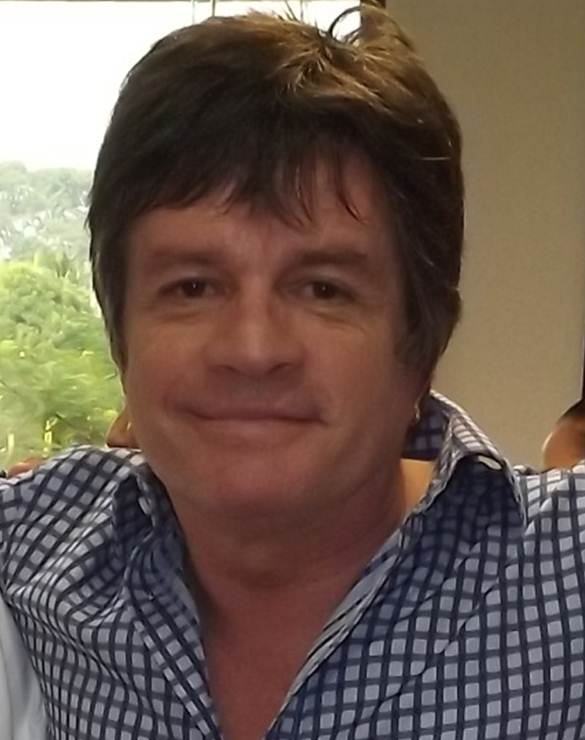
Alejandro Camacho, winner for Best Antagonist Actor.

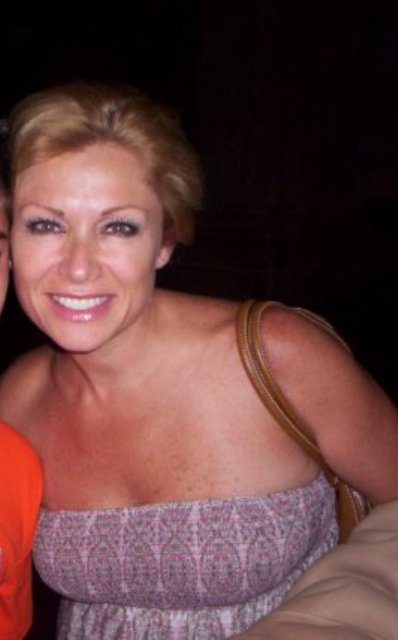
Leticia Calderón, winner for Best Young Lead Actress.

Best Telenovela	Best Production
Cuna de lobos; El camino secreto; La gloria y el infierno	Gonzalo Martínez Ortega – La gloria y el infierno
Best Actress	Best Actor
Rebecca Jones – Cuna de lobos; Daniela Romo – El camino secreto; Ofelia Medina – La gloria y el infierno	Héctor Bonilla – La gloria y el infierno; Fernando Balzaretti – La gloria y el infierno; Salvador Pineda – El camino secreto
Best Antagonist Actress	Best Antagonist Actor
María Rubio – Cuna de lobos; Lilia Aragón – Cuna de lobos; Úrsula Prats – Monte Calvario	Alejandro Camacho – Cuna de lobos; Claudio Brook – El camino secreto; José Alonso – Monte Calvario
Best Experienced Actress	Best Experienced Actor
María Rubio – Cuna de lobos; Carmen Montejo – Cuna de lobos; Saby Kamalich – La gloria y el infierno	Carlos Ancira – El camino secreto; Jorge Russek – La gloria y el infierno; Rafael Baledón – Ave fénix
Best Young Lead Actress	Best Young Lead Actor
Leticia Calderón – La indomable; Laura Flores – Ave fénix; Patricia Pereyra – Pobre juventud	Alberto Mayagoitía – Pobre juventud; Arturo Peniche – La indomable; Juan Antonio Edwards – Ave fénix
Best Female Revelation	Best Male Revelation
Gabriela Rivero – El camino secreto; Adela Noriega – Yesenia; Rosa María Bianchi – Cuna de lobos	Odiseo Bichir – Monte Calvario; Ernesto Laguardia – Pobre juventud; Humberto Elizondo – Cuna de lobos
Best Original Story or Adaptation	Best Direction
Carlos Olmos – Cuna de lobos; Antonio Monsell – La gloria y el infierno; José Rendón and Emilio Larrosa – El camino secreto	Carlos Téllez – Cuna de lobos; Gonzalo Martínez Ortega – La gloria y el infierno; José Rendón – El camino secreto

=== Other Awards ===
Best Debut Actress or Actor
- Sebastián Ligarde – Pobre juventud

=== Comedy and Variety Programs ===
Best Comedy Program	Best Entertainment or Variety Program
Cachún cachún ra ra!; Chespirito; Chiquilladas; Qué lío con este trío; ¿Qué nos pasa?	Siempre en domingo; El mundo del espectáculo; Estrellas de los 80; Vídeo éxitos; XE-TU
Best Comedic Performance	Best Host or Hostess
Roberto Gómez Bolaños – Chespirito; Héctor Suárez – ¿Qué nos pasa?; Jorge Ortiz de Pinedo – Qué lío con este trío; José Magaña – Cachún cachún ra ra!; Raúl "Chato" Padilla – Chespirito	Raúl Velasco; Claudia Córdova; Manuel Valdés; Pati Chapoy; René Casados
Best Singer	Revelation as a Singer
Marco Antonio Muñiz; Emmanuel; José José; Juan Gabriel; Vicente Fernández	Manuel Mijares; Arturo Vázquez; Erika Buenfil; Eugenia León; Jerardo

=== Special awards ===
- Best Telenovela Soundtrack Composer.: Pedro Plascencia Salinas for Cuna de lobos
