= La gloria y el infierno =

Mexican telenovela

- Genre: Telenovela; Drama
- Created by: Antonio Monsell
- Written by: Antonio Monsell
- Directed by: Gonzalo Martínez Ortega
- Starring: Ofelia Medina; Héctor Bonilla; Fernando Balzaretti; Jorge Russek; Saby Kamalich; Elvira Monsell; Pedro Armendáriz, Jr. Salvador Sánchez
- Opening theme: La gloria y el infierno
- Country of origin: Mexico
- Original language: Spanish
- No. of episodes: 120

Production
- Executive producers: Juan Osorio; Gonzalo Martínez Ortega
- Cinematography: Ernesto Medina
- Running time: 21-22 minutes
- Production company: Televisa

Original release
- Network: Canal de las Estrellas
- Release: March 17 – August 29, 1986

Related
- De pura sangre; El camino secreto

La gloria y el infierno (English title: Glory and Hell) is a Mexican telenovela produced by Gonzalo Martínez Ortega and Juan Osorio for Televisa in 1986. It is based on the novel Duel in the Sun by American writer Niven Busch. It starred Ofelia Medina, Héctor Bonilla, Fernando Balzaretti and Saby Kamalich.

== Plot ==
After the Mexican Revolution, Sara Vallarta, wife of Fernando de Michoacán a landowner agrees to meet with his cousin and former boyfriend, Sebastian Arteaga. To avoid rumors, Concerta appointment in an abandoned church and go along with his two sons, Michael and Sergio. Sebastian confesses he has joined an Indian with whom he has a daughter, Agnes, but that has never stopped loving her.

He asks Sara that if something happens to him, care for your family. Just Sebastián goes, appears Fernando who explained while Sara immediately assumes she is unfaithful and since then, ejected from his bed and does not return you to talk to. Although Sara is still living in the home of her ex-husband, is practically a ghost because it is completely ignored.

Sebastian dies, and his wife, Sara proud not go where, however, relates to the owner of a tavern not caring that Inés grow in such sordid environment. Twenty years later, President Lázaro Cárdenas began his agrarian program of expropriation of farms, and Fernando Vallarta is the main opposition to this measure. Just in these circumstances is when the beautiful orphan Inés comes to live with Vallarta.

== Cast ==
- Ofelia Medina as Inés Arteaga
- Héctor Bonilla as Miguel Vallarta
- Fernando Balzaretti as Sergio Vallarta
- Jorge Russek as Don Fernando Vallarta
- Saby Kamalich as Sara Vallarta
- Elvira Monsell as Martina
- Pedro Armendáriz Jr. as Sebastián Arteaga
- Salvador Sánchez as Asunción
- Anna Silvetti as Adriana
- Lucía Guilmáin as Concha
- Josefina Echánove as Guadalupe
- Arturo Beristáin as Madrigal
- Dolores Beristáin as Vicenta
- Arturo Benavides as Pontón
- Arlette Pacheco as Amalia
- Patricio Castillo as Dr. Mendoza
- Carlos Cardán as Valerio Redondo
- Miguel Gómez Checa as Augusto
- Alberto Gavira as Graciano
- Uriel Chávez as Cruz
- Guillermo Gil as Genaro
- Gilberto Pérez Gallardo as Yáñez
- David Phillips as Sergio (child)
- Sergio Bonilla as Miguel (child)
- Nelly as Inés (child)
- Mario Casillas as Lic. Arvides
- Blanca Torres as María
- Quintín Bulnes as Yáñez
- Narciso Busquets as Gallardo
- Jorge Fegán
- Maribel Tarrago
- Jesús Gómez Munguía
- Ángel de la Peña
- Gustavo del Castillo
- Federico Romano
- Dacia González
