= 3rd TVyNovelas Awards =

1985 Mexican TV awards

- Date: May 21, 1985
- Location: Centro Libanés, Mexico City, Mexico D.F., Mexico
- Hosted by: Claudia Córdoba & Juan Calderón

Highlights
- Most awards: La traición (5)
- Most nominations: La traición (8)

Television/radio coverage
- Network: Canal de las Estrellas

The 3rd TVyNovelas Awards were an academy of special awards to the best soap operas and TV shows. The awards ceremony took place on May 21, 1985, in the Centro Libanés, in Mexico City, Mexico D.F. The ceremony was televised in Mexico by Canal de las Estrellas.

Claudia Córdoba and Juan Calderón hosted the show. La traición won 5 awards, the most for the evening, including Best Telenovela. Other winners La fiera won 2 awards and Amalia Batista, Guadalupe, La pasión de Isabela and Los años felices won 1 each.

== Summary of awards and nominations ==
Telenovela	Nominations	Awards
La traición	8	5
La pasión de Isabela	5	1
Amalia Batista	4	1
Guadalupe	3	1
Los años felices	3	1
La fiera	2	2

== Winners and nominees ==
=== Telenovelas ===
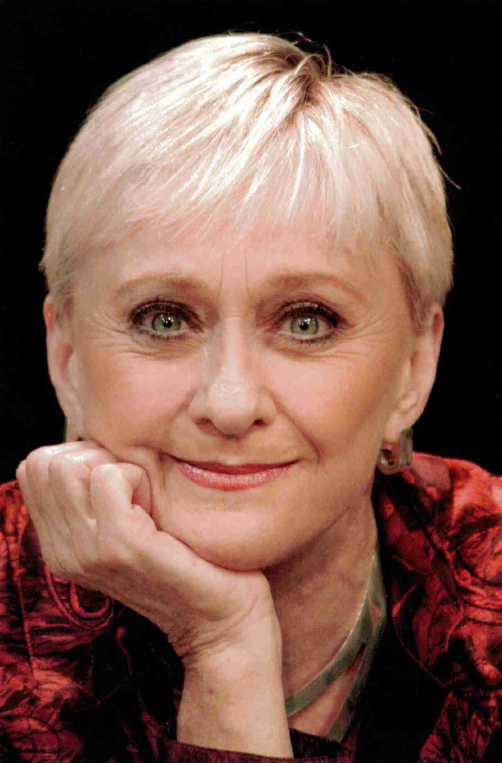
Susana Alexander, winner for Best Actress.

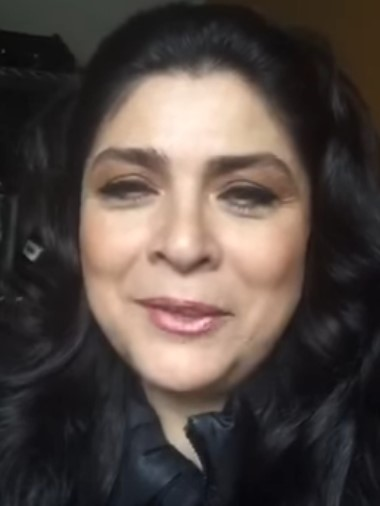
Victoria Ruffo, winner for Best Young Lead Actress.

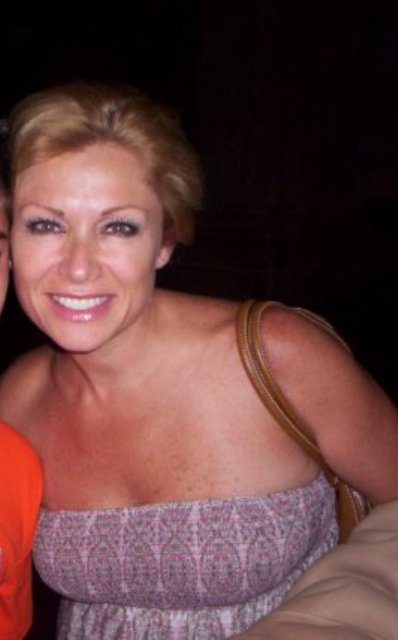
Leticia Calderón, winner for Best Debut Actress.

Best Telenovela	Best Direction
La traición; Amalia Batista; La pasión de Isabela	Raúl Araiza – La traición
Best Actress	Best Actor
Susana Alexander – La traición; Ana Martín – La pasión de Isabela; Helena Rojo – La traición	Sergio Jiménez – La traición; Héctor Bonilla – La pasión de Isabela; Jorge Vargas – La traición
Best Young Lead Actress	Best Young Lead Actor
Victoria Ruffo – La fiera; Alma Delfina – Guadalupe; Laura Flores – Los años felices	Guillermo Capetillo – La fiera; Jaime Garza – Guadalupe; Manuel Saval – Los años felices
Best Female Revelation	Best Male Revelation
Anna Silvetti – La pasión de Isabela; Gabriela Ruffo – La traición; Leticia Calderón – Amalia Batista	Manuel Saval – Los años felices; Alfonso Iturralde – La pasión de Isabela; Roberto Ballesteros – Amalia Batista

=== Other Awards ===
Best Debut Actress	Best Debut Actor
Leticia Calderón – Amalia Batista	Ernesto Laguardia – Cachún cachún ra ra!
Best Child Actress	Best Child Actor
Nayelli Saldívar – Guadalupe	Carlos Espejel – Chiquilladas

=== Comedy and Variety Programs ===
Best Comedy Program	Best Variety Program
Cachún cachún ra ra!	Siempre en domingo
Best Comedy Actress	Best Comedy Actor
Chela Castro – No empujen	Pompín Iglesias – Mi secretaria
Revelation in Comedy	Revelation as a Hostess
Alicia Sandoval – Venustiana	Pati Chapoy
Best Hostess	Best Host
Gloria Calzada	Raúl Velasco
Best TV-Singer	Revelation as a TV-Singer
Emmanuel	Tatiana

=== Special awards ===
- Best Villain of the Year: Sergio Jiménez for La traición
- Best International Production: Los cuentos de Cri-Cri, produced by Miguel Alemán Velasco
- Lifetime Artistic Achievement Award: Miguel Manzano
- International Young Singer: Luis Miguel
- Best Cabaret Show: Diego Verdaguer and Amanda Miguel

=== Absent ===
People who did not attend the ceremony and were nominated in the shortlist in each category:

- Susana Alexander (Her mother, Brígida Alexander, received the award in her place)
