= Los años perdidos =

Mexican telenovela

- Genre: Telenovela; Drama
- Created by: Carmen Daniels
- Written by: Luis Reyes de la Maza
- Starring: Rogelio Guerra; Silvia Pasquel; Ana Colchero; Alejandro Aragón; Javier Marc; Romina Castro
- Country of origin: Mexico
- Original language: Spanish

Production
- Executive producer: Raúl Lozano Telere
- Cinematography: Javier Marc
- Production company: Tele Rey

Original release
- Network: KVEA 52
- Release: 1987 – 1988

Los años perdidos (English title: The lost years) is a Mexican telenovela produced by Raúl Lozano Telere for Tele Rey in 1987. It is not a sequel of telenovelas Los años felices and Los años pasan. It starred by Rogelio Guerra, Silvia Pasquel, Ana Colchero and Alejandro Aragón.

== Cast ==
- Rogelio Guerra
- Silvia Pasquel
- Ana Colchero
- Alejandro Aragón
- Javier Marc
- Romina Castro
