= El amor ajeno =

Television series

- Genre: Telenovela
- Created by: Fernanda Villeli; Marissa Garrido
- Directed by: Julio Castillo
- Starring: Irma Lozano; Ramón Pons; Bertha Moss; Jorge Lavat; Kitty de Hoyos; Úrsula Prats
- Country of origin: Mexico
- Original language: Spanish

Production
- Executive producer: Irene Sabido
- Cinematography: Ernesto Arreola
- Production company: Televisa

Original release
- Network: Canal 2
- Release: 23 March 1983 – 13 January 1984

Related
- Vivir enamorada; Guadalupe; Entre brumas (1973)

El amor ajeno (English title: The love of others) is a Mexican telenovela produced by Irene Sabido for Televisa in 1983. It is an adaptation of the telenovela Entre brumas produced in 1973.

Irma Lozano and Jorge Lavat starred as protagonists, while Úrsula Prats starred as the main antagonist.

== Cast ==
- Irma Lozano as Deborah
- Jorge Lavat as Charlie
- Ramón Pons as Pablo Medina
- Bertha Moss as Sara
- Kitty de Hoyos as Susana/Ivonne
- Miguel Manzano as Jaime de la Serna
- Úrsula Prats as Úrsula
- Tony Carbajal as Oscar Enriquez
- Manuel Ojeda as Roberto
- Fabian as Juan Luis
- Manuel Capetillo Jr. as Gonzalo
- Elizabeth Aguilar as María
- Karmen Erpenbach as Elisa
- Hector Flores as Alfredo
- Irma Porter as Margarita
- Patricia Thomas as Loris
