= Las modelos (TV series) =

Mexican telenovela

- Genre: Telenovela
- Created by: (Original story); Abelardo Arias (Adaptation); Fernanda Villeli
- Directed by: José Morris
- Country of origin: Mexico
- Original language: Spanish

Original release
- Network: Canal de las Estrellas
- Release: 1963

Las modelos is a Mexican telenovela produced by Ernesto Alonso for Teleprogramas Acapulco, SA in 1963.

== Cast ==
- Ariadna Welter - Nilsa
- Rita Macedo - Sonia
- Alma Delia Fuentes - Diana
- Graciela Lara - Gloria
- Fanny Schiller - Señora Gallardo
