= Herencia maldita =

Mexican telenovela

- Genre: Telenovela; Drama
- Created by: Caridad Bravo Adams
- Written by: Violante Villamil; Lila Yolanda Andrade
- Directed by: Sergio Jiménez
- Starring: Angélica María; Miguel Palmer; Manuel Ojeda; Liliana Abud; David Reynoso; Marco Muñoz
- Opening theme: El hombre de mi vida by Angélica María
- Country of origin: Mexico
- Original language: Spanish
- No. of episodes: 120

Production
- Executive producer: Ernesto Alonso
- Running time: 21-22 minutes
- Production company: Televisa

Original release
- Network: Canal de las Estrellas
- Release: November 3, 1986 – April 24, 1987

Related
- Ave Fénix; La indomable

Herencia maldita (English title: Cursed inheritance) is a Mexican telenovela produced by Ernesto Alonso for Televisa in 1986.

Angélica María and Miguel Palmer starred as protagonists, while Manuel Ojeda and Liliana Abud starred as antagonists.

== Plot ==
Adela Beltrán is a woman who lives with her mother Elisa, who (through her addiction to gambling) ended up losing all the wealth that both received an inheritance. This forces Adela to try stealing in order to survive.

== Cast ==
- Angélica María as Adela Beltrán
- Miguel Palmer as Armando Rojas
- David Reynoso as Roberto Rojas
- Manuel Ojeda as Rogelio Velarde
- Liliana Abud as Clara Velarde
- Marco Muñoz as Antoine
- Emilia Carranza as Milagros
- Margarita Gralia as Laura
- Marcela de Galina as Susan
- Malena Doria as Virginia
- Roberto Antúnez as Rafael
- Susana Alexander as Elisa
- Rafael Amador as Raúl
- Luis Xavier as Phillipe
- Jorge del Campo as Enrique
- Fabio Ramírez as Manuel
- Maristel Molina as Rosa
- Alicia Montoya as Catherine
- Roberto Carrera as Vincent
- Nadia Haro Oliva as Janet
- Queta Lavat as Estela
- Angélica Vale as Adela Beltrán (child)
- Cristian Castro as Armando Rojas (child)
- José Antonio Ferral as Brown
- Sergio Jiménez as Arturo Villaseñor
- Ana Luisa Peluffo as Linda
- María Marcela as Susan
