= Extraños caminos del amor =

Mexican telenovela

- Genre: Telenovela
- Created by: Fernanda Villeli
- Written by: Fernanda Villeli
- Directed by: Alfredo Saldaña
- Starring: Helena Rojo; José Roberto; Alfredo Leal; Magda Guzmán; Gastón Tuset; Lucy Tovar; Gloria Mayo; Bertha Moss
- Opening theme: Extraños caminos del amor by José Roberto
- Country of origin: Mexico
- Original language: Spanish

Production
- Executive producer: Ernesto Alonso
- Cinematography: Alfredo Saldaña
- Production company: Televisa

Original release
- Network: Canal de las Estrellas
- Release: April 27, 1981 – February 12, 1982

Related
- Aprendiendo a amar; Vanessa

Extraños caminos del amor (English: Love’s strange ways) is a Mexican telenovela produced by Ernesto Alonso for Televisa in 1981. Helena Rojo, Alfredo Leal, and José Roberto starred as protagonists.

== Plot ==
Isabella is a shy young woman who has dedicated her life to caring for her sick mother. One day, in the Church, currency and immediately a man realizes that he has reached her prince. The man is businessman Samuel War and also attracted to the quiet woman. Overwhelmed by the death of his mother Isabella impulsively accepts the proposal of marriage of Samuel and marries ignoring the past and the strange family of her husband.

== Cast ==
- Helena Rojo as Isabella
- José Roberto as Carlos Guerra
- Alfredo Leal as Samuel Guerra
- Magda Guzmán as Antonia Guerra
- René Casados as Miguel Guerra
- Angélica Chain as Olga
- Antonio Valencia as Vicente Sotomayor
- Gastón Tuset as Ernesto
- Lucy Tovar as Irene
- Jorge del Campo as Víctor
- Gloria Mayo as Sofía
- Bertha Moss as Gertrudis
- Daniel Lago as Enrique
- Sergio Goyri as Álvaro
- Angelita Castany as Rosario
- Queta Lavat as Jacinta
- Alberto Inzúa as Múñoz
- Consuelo Frank as Elisa
- Maribel Fernández as Alicia
- Enrique del Castillo as Porfirio
