= Murder in a Blue World =

- Theatrical release poster
- Directed by: Eloy de la Iglesia
- Screenplay by: Eloy de la Iglesia; José Luis Garci; Antonio Fons; Antonio Artero; George Lebourg
- Produced by: José Frade
- Starring: Sue Lyon; Chris Mitchum; Jean Sorel
- Cinematography: Francisco Fraile
- Edited by: José Luis Matesanz
- Music by: Georges Garvarentz
- Production companies: José Frade Producciones Cinematográficas S.A. Intercontinental Productions
- Release dates: 22 August 1973 (Madrid, Spain); 13 November 1974 (France)
- Running time: 100 min
- Countries: Spain; France
- Language: English
- Box office: ESP 25,198,396 (Spain)

Murder in a Blue World (Spanish: Una gota de sangre para morir amando, lit. A Drop of Blood to Die Loving; French: Le bal du vaudou, lit. The Voodoo Ball) is a 1973 Spanish-French dystopian science fiction/crime/horror film directed by Eloy de la Iglesia and starring Sue Lyon, Christopher Mitchum and Jean Sorel.

The plot follows a respectable nurse, who seduces young men, takes them home to bed, listens to the post-coital beating of their hearts, and then stabs them to death with a surgical scalpel. The film takes some cues from Stanley Kubrick's A Clockwork Orange to the extent of being released on UK VHS as Clockwork Terror.

== Plot ==
Anna Vernia, a beautiful young nurse, receives a medal of recognition for her outstanding dedication to her patients at the medical center where she works. She is going out with Victor Sender, a doctor working in the same hospital. Victor is deeply involved in a project that employs electro-shock therapy in violent criminals in an effort to turn them into model citizens.

Crime is rampant in the city. There has been a number of unresolved killings of young men which have been attributed to a serial killer believed to be a sadistic homosexual. A family is getting ready to watch Stanley Kubrick's A Clockwork Orange on television when they are assaulted by a gang of delinquents who knock at their door. The assailants, wearing red helmets, leather biker's outfits, and handling bullwhips smash the modern looking apartment. They rape both husband and wife but leave the couple's young son unharmed. After their crime, there is a dispute among the four members of the gang. One gang member, David, is beaten up and expelled from the group.

Anna is a pop art collector. She is the highest bidder in an auction of Alex Raymond’s artwork for Flash Gordon. At the auction, she gives her phone number to her bidder rival, Toni, a young man with a handicapped leg. Anna lives alone in a large mansion on the outskirts of the city where Toni comes to see her. After they have sex, Anna listens to Toni’s heartbeats while he sleeps and stabs him to death with a surgical scalpel. She disposes of Toni's body in a river, but she has been secretly observed by David. He finds out Anna's information through her car’s number plate and begins to follow her. Wearing a wig and dressed matronly, Anna seduces Bruno, a narcissistic underwear model, who she has seen on TV commercials. She takes him home and kills him. His body falls next to the book Anna was reading: Vladimir Nabokov's novel "Lolita".

Although Anna is still going out with Victor, she rebuffs his romantic advances. Dressed in drag, Anna enters a gay bar where she picks up Roman Mendoza, a gay man who she takes home. After dancing a waltz, Anna proposes to have sex. He is initially hesitant. He thought she was a lesbian. He had never had sex with a woman before, but he is game. While Anna was out, David entered her house after befriending the German Shepherd that guarded her property. Hiding behind curtains, David witnesses Anna seducing the young gay man and sees her stab him in the heart.

Broken glass inside her house alerts Anna that there is an intruder. When she looks outside she sees David playing with her dogs behind the mansion fence. Anna, pretending to be a maid, befriends David and invites him in. When she is going to start her pre-murder routine, David shows her the surgical scalpel used by Anna to kill her victims. She has been hiding it inside a music box. David does not want to denounce her to the police, but he begins to blackmail her instead. Through their monetary transactions, David begins to arouse Anna's personal interest. David buys a motorcycle with the money, but the members of his former gang, who believe he has stolen a bounty from them, pursue him and leave him badly beaten. David is taken to the hospital where Anna works. Since David was a violent criminal in the past, Victor wants to experiment on him the electro-shock therapy to turn killers like David into “useful citizens”. Anna is moved when she finds out that David is now her patient. She is not going to allow Victor to use David for his experiments. At night on New Year's Eve, Anna reads a poem by Edgar Allan Poe to David. When Victor arrives he finds Anna covered in David's blood after she killed him. In another room, the criminal patients in Victor's experiment go berserk, savagely killing each other.

== Cast ==
- Sue Lyon as Ana Vernia
- Christopher Mitchum as David
- Jean Sorel as Dr. Victor Sender
- Ramón Pons as Toni
- Charly Bravo as Bruno
- Alfredo Alba as Román Mendoza
- Antonio del Real as Mick
- David Carpenter as Phil
- Ramón Tejela as Nicola

== Alternative titles ==
The original Spanish title Una gota de sangre para morir amando translates as A Drop of Blood to Die Loving and the film was theatrically released in France as Le bal du vaudou and in the United States as To Love, Perhaps to Die with the latter title a closer translation of the Spanish. In the mid-1980s Empire Video released the film on UK VHS as Clockwork Terror in an attempt to sell it almost as a sequel to A Clockwork Orange and its following British video and DVD releases were titled Murder in a Blue World in reference to the fictional Blue Drink featured in the film.

== Analysis ==
The film takes some cues from Stanley Kubrick's A Clockwork Orange to the extent that it was even released on 1980s UK VHS as Clockwork Terror. Like its inspiration source the film is set in a near-future dystopian world where sadistic gangs attack, rape and steal from innocent people on the streets and in their homes. To elaborate, the film plays on the Ludovico Technique of its predecessor as a neo-Fascist government tries to fight these crimes by conducting sinister mind-control experiments on captured criminals. This treatment ultimately backfires with bloody results at the end of the film.

The science fiction aesthetic of the film is more pronounced compared to Kubrick's with its retro-futuristic setting also recalling those of other 1970s science fiction films such as Soylent Green and Rollerball. However, the film isn't a mere copycat of Kubrick's masterpiece as it also has the feel and construction (story development-wise) of the Italian Giallo films of the time as well as this genre's staple of gruesome murder scenes. It has also been argued that the film's graphic violence played an influence on some of Paul Verhoeven's films.

A Clockwork Orange is directly referenced in the film, in a knowing and post-modern way that acknowledges the influence overtly. A family are seen settling down to watch a television broadcast of the film (with introductory onscreen images of Kubrick), just before their home is invaded and they are assaulted by a Droog-like gang.

Further examples of this tendency are the casting of Sue Lyon herself, whose character is shown reading Lolita.

Alex Raymond Flash Gordon art is depicted as highly valuable fine art, in a (then) satiric and prescient scene, which recalls a character's treasured collection of comic books in Elio Petri's The Tenth Victim.

== Home media ==
In 1986 the film was released on UK VHS by Empire Video as Clockwork Terror and again in by Pagan Films as Murder in a Blue World with this second English title also used for its British DVD releases in 2004 and 2009 by Hanzibar Films and HB Films respectively. The original Spanish version is 100 minutes long and when the film was first released on UK VHS as Clockwork Terror (running time - 96:42 minutes) it had two scenes of added expositional footage, but the BBFC cut 2:06 minutes of violent scenes which were later intact in the subsequent home video releases with the new title of Murder in a Blue World (running time - 98:21 minutes); in turn the two scenes of expositional dialogue were missing from these latter releases. To this day the entire uncut film hasn't been released on home video in its native Spain, the UK, the US or anywhere else, but if one watches the 1986 British VHS of the film and compares it to its later video and DVD releases (which all feature the same running time of the film print) in terms of the deleted scenes in each version then one can piece together how the whole unedited film would be like.

On 22 November 2022, the film was released on Blu-ray in North America by Cauldron Films, in what is advertised as a 'Producer's Cut', with a listed running time of 97 minutes.
