= Monte Calvario =

Mexican telenovela

- Genre: Telenovela; Romance; Drama
- Created by: Delia Fiallo
- Directed by: Beatriz Sheridan
- Starring: Edith González; Arturo Peniche; José Alonso; Úrsula Prats; Lili Inclán; Aurora Molina; René Muñoz; Alfonso Iturralde
- Opening theme: Como fue by José José
- Country of origin: Mexico
- Original language: Spanish
- No. of episodes: 120

Production
- Executive producers: Valentín Pimstein; Angelli Nesma Medina
- Production locations: Michoacán, Mexico; Mexico City, Mexico
- Running time: 21-22 minutes
- Production company: Televisa

Original release
- Network: Canal de las Estrellas
- Release: April 28 – October 10, 1986

Related
- La mujer que no podía amar (Radionovela); Te sigo amando (1996); La que no podía amar (2011); Amanecer (2025)

Monte calvario (English title:Mount Calvary) is a Mexican telenovela produced by Valentín Pimstein and Angelli Nesma Medina for Televisa in 1986. It is an original story Delia Fiallo of and directed by Beatriz Sheridan.

Edith González, Arturo Peniche and José Alonso starred as protagonists, while Úrsula Prats, Lili Inclán and Consuelo Frank starred as main antagonists.

== Cast ==
- Edith González as Ana Rosa Pérez Montalbán
- Arturo Peniche as Dr. Gustavo Seckerman
- José Alonso as Octavio Montero
- Úrsula Prats as Olivia Montero
- Lili Inclán as Tomasa
- Aurora Molina as Chana
- René Muñoz as Father Cito
- Alfonso Iturralde as Roberto #1
- Odiseo Bichir as Roberto #2
- Consuelo Frank as Rosario
- Javier Herranz as Carlos
- Julia Marichal as Matilde
- María Idalia as La Loca/Ana Teresa
- Alejandro Landero as Margarito
- Lizzeta Romo as Elisa
- Juan Carlos Serrán as Juan Camacho
- Sylvia Suárez as Mercedes Seckerman
- Raquel Parot as Mother Director
- Rosa María Bianchi as Esther
- Leticia Calderón as Tere
- Ricardo Cervantes as Inspector
- Alejandro Tommasi as Caleta Montero
- Patricia Dávalos as Mama
- Omar Fierro as Román
- Armando Franco as Jaime
- Pedro Geraldo as Graciano
- Antonio González as Judge
- Christopher Lago as Marito
- Dalilah Polanco as Chole
- Rodolfo Lago as Fermín
- Ismael Larumbe as Doctor
- David Rencoret as Felipe
- Armando Palomo as Julio
- Aurora Clavel as Fernanda
- Liliana Weimer as Susanna
- Pedro Damián as Alfonso
- Jorge Lavat as Armando Montero
- Armando Calvo as Antonio
- Gerardo Klein as Gerardo
- Stella Inda
- Héctor Catalán as Bernardo
- Lei Quintana as Juliana
- Ernesto del Castillo
- Bertha Cervera as Martilia
- Jaime Lozano
- Patricia Mayers
- Denise Rendón
- Talia
- Alonso Sandoval as Gustavito
- Juan Verduzco as Doctor
- Eduardo Diaz Reyna as Comisario
- Macario Álvarez as Agent

== Awards and nominations ==
Year	Award	Category	Nominee	Result
1987	5th TVyNovelas Awards	Best Antagonist Actress	Úrsula Prats	Nominated
1987	5th TVyNovelas Awards	Best Antagonist Actor	José Alonso	Nominated
1987	5th TVyNovelas Awards	Best Male Revelation	Odiseo Bichir	Won
