= La casa del farol rojo =

- Starring: Tere Velázquez; Norma Lazareno; Carlos East; Rogelio Guerra; Sara García
- Release date: 1971
- Running time: 100 minute
- Country: Mexico
- Language: Spanish

La casa del farol rojo ("The House of the Red Lantern") is a 1971 Mexican film. It stars Rogelio Guerra.
