= Sebastián Ligarde =

American actor and acting coach (born 1954)

Sebastian Ligarde
- Born: Amedee Gerardo Ligarde Mayaudon; January 26, 1954 (age 72); Laredo, Texas, United States
- Occupations: Actor, director
- Years active: 1976-2009; 2014-present
- Spouse: Jorge López Lira (m. 2013)

Sebastián Ligarde (Spanish pronunciation: [seβasˈtjan liˈɣaɾðe]; born January 26, 1954) is a Mexican-American actor and acting coach best known for his work in telenovelas and the big screen. In his four decade career he has appeared in more than 25 TV shows and over 90 films - most of them in first billing.

In 2015, Ligarde portrayed "Dr. Raimundo Acosta" in the UniMás TV series Demente Criminal, in which his former student Enrique Alejandro interpreted "Billy".

== Biography ==
Born Amedee Gerardo Ligarde Mayaudon to Mexican-American father Amedee Ligarde Saenz, and Mexican mother Emma Armantina Mayaudon Lopez, this dual-national began his acting career in Mexico in the play Fortune and Men's Eyes in 1974. He obtained his first film role in Supervivientes de los Andes two years later. He graduated with a degree in film directing and a minor in acting from the University of Texas at Austin, and then moved to Mexico to continue his acting career. Before finding steady work in Mexico, he appeared in various USA film and television productions with Alfred Hitchcock, John Hurt, and Richard Harris.

Ligarde became known in Mexico after landing the role of Memo in the successful TV series Quinceañera in 1987. His very famous phrase "Serena Morena" has remained a public domain after two decades. From 1986 thru 2003 he remained an exclusive actor for the Mexican Television Producer Televisa. His popular roles in telenovelas such as Lo Blanco y lo Negro, Entre la Vida y la Muerte, María la del Barrio, Salomé, Tú y yo, Belinda and most recently Demente Criminal have kept him a household name. Ligarde is usually seen playing the role of a villain, degenerate, or miscreant.

He was awarded the Diosa de Plata and El Heraldo, both for Best Film Actor in El Homicida. Ligarde has also obtained four TVyNovelas Awards (Mexico's equivalent of an Emmy Award) for Pobre Juventud, Quinceañera, Entre La Vida y La Muerte, and an Honorary Award in 2002. In 2002 the League of United Latin American Citizens named him "Sr. Internacional" for his contribution to that society and as "Honorary President of the Republic of the Rio Grande" for his contributions to the state of Texas.

In 2005, Ligarde played "Gonzalo Montero", the alcoholic antagonist in Olvidarte Jamás for Venevision. He also portrayed "Alan" and "George Smith" in their TV series Mi Vida Eres Tu.

In 2006, he became the acting coach for Venevision and made a special appearance in Acorralada.

In 2007, Ligarde played the villain "Manuel" in Telemundo's Pecados Ajenos, where he reunited with Sonya Smith from Olvidarte Jamás & Acorralada. That same year, and for Telemundo Productions, he also made two guest appearances in the TV series Decisiones.

In 2008, he played the antagonist "Santori" (a Vatican City paid hit-man) in the mini-series Gabriel. This project, made by Mega-Films, reunites him with Chayanne whom he co-starred with in their first telenovela for both actors in 1986 Pobre Juventud.

== Meisner Technique Teacher ==
Ligarde has been teaching acting at Taller de Actuación Sebastián Ligarde since 2006 in Miami. He trains actors in film acting, and is the only known "Meisner in Spanish" teacher. After 35 years as an actor he now enjoys his own acting academy and has, for now, retired from acting. His past students include Thalía, William Levy, Jencarlos Canela, Enrique Alejandro, Elizabeth Gutiérrez, Alejandro de la Madrid, Julián Gil, Frances Ondiviela, Daniel Elbittar, and Sissi Fleitas.

In 2015, Taller de Actuación Sebastián Ligarde will also open in Houston, Texas.

== Personal life ==
In a 2013 interview with TVyNovelas magazine, Ligarde came out as gay, saying he has been in a stable relationship for the last 20 years. He credits performer Ricky Martin, who came out in 2010, as his inspiration.

== Filmography ==
Films
Year	Title	Role	Notes
1976	Supervivientes de los Andes	Felipe	
1976	Longitud de guerra		
1980	Verano salvaje		
1982	Antonieta	Esposo Norteamericano	
1983	Triumphs of a Man Called Horse	Mullins	
1984	Toy Soldiers	Lt. Caden	
1985	Remo Williams: The Adventure Begins	Pvt. Johnson	
1986	Chido Guan, el tacos de oro	Wilfredo Sherman	
1986	Mission Kill	Secretary	
1987	Lamberto Quintero	Oscar Balderrama Jr.	
1988	Relajo matrimonial		
1989	La ley de las calles	Juan Carlos	
1989	Apuesta contra la muerte	Mario	
1990	Jack el vigilante		
1990	El despiadado		
1990	El homicida		
1990	La secta de la muerte		
1990	La guerra de los bikinis		
1990	Atrapados en la coca		
1991	Ritmo traición y muerte: La cumbia asesina	El Drácula	Video
1991	Justicia de nadie		
1991	Frontera roja		
1991	La tentación	Gato	
1991	Verano peligroso	Mario Rosadon	
1991	La pareja perfecta	Francisco Oceguera	
1991	A golpe de hacha		
1992	Por un salvaje amor		
1992	El tigre de la frontera		
1992	Traficantes de niños		
1992	Supervivencia	McCoy	
1992	El sacristán del diablo	Pedro	
1992	Comando terrorista		
1992	Cazador de cabezas		
1993	Infancia violenta		Video
1993	Círculo del vicio		
1993	El asesino del zodíaco	Arturo	
1993	Se equivoco la cigueña		
1993	Obsesión de matar		
1993	Entre el amor y la muerte		
1994	Las esclavas del sadismo		
1994	El perfil del crimen		Video
1994	Las pasiones del poder	Alonso Miranda	
1994	La perversión		
1994	Justicia	Arturo Pérez	
1995	La ley del cholo		
1995	Esclavos de la pasión		
1995	Los cómplices del infierno		
1995	Venganza mortal	Alejandro	
1995	Las nueve caras del miedo		
1995	Eva secuestrada y Adán... ¡como si nada!	Adán	
1995	Deseo criminal		
1996	Trebol negro		
1996	El rigór de la ley		
1997	Tormenta de muerte		
1997	El cartel de Juarez		Video
1997	El güero estrada	Billy Mathews	Video
1997	Ambición mortal		
1998	Sangre sobre el polvo		Video
1998	La mafia de un gallero		Video
1998	La fuga de Arizmendi		Video
1999	Reclusorio III		
1999	Monjas narcotraficantes		Video
1999	La fuga de Arizmendi 2		Video
1999	El mariachi narcotraficante		Video
1999	El agente Borrego		
1999	Cuentas claras	Erick Solana	
2001	Ritmo, traición y muerte: La cumbia asesina 2		
2002	Ángel de la noche		
2003	Muerte lenta		
2003	Morras desmadrosas 2: ¿Y el desmadre?	Fausto	
2003	Eran cabrones los secuestradores	Omar Salgado	
2003	Cursos prenupciales		
2004	Desnudos	Doctor	
2013	The Dark Forest	Assassin	Short film

Television
Year	Title	Role	Notes
1985	Alfred Hitchcock Presents	Tim	Episode: "Breakdown" (season 1, episode 8)
1986	En alas de las águilas	Aide #1	TV mini-series
1986	Pobre juventud	Freddy	
1986	Marionetas	Luis	
1987	Quinceañera	Guillermo "Memo" López	Main antagonist
1989	Lo blanco y lo negro	Andrés de Castro	
1990	En carne propia	Abigail Múñoz	
1993	Entre la vida y la muerte	Lic. Andrés del Valle	Main antagonist
1994	Prisionera de amor	Gerardo Ávila	
1995	María la del Barrio	Lic. Gonzalo Dorantes	Antagonist/Protagonist
1998	Vivo por Elena	Ernesto de los Monteros	Main antagonist
2000	La casa en la playa	Salvador Villarreal	
2000	Primer amor... a mil por hora	Antonio Iturriaga Riquelme	Antagonist
2001	Salomé	Diego Duval	Main antagonist
2001-02	Mujer, casos de la vida real	Various roles	Episode: "Amor del bueno" Episode: "Naufragio"
2004	Belinda	Adolfo Semprum	Main antagonist
2004	Tormenta de passiones	Mauricio Miranda	Main antagonist
2005	Pasiones prohibidas	Enrique	27 episodes
2006	Mi vida eres tú	Alan Robinson / George Smith	
2006	Olvidarte jamás	Gonzalo Montero	Main antagonist
2007-08	Acorralada	Licenciado Borges	
2007	Decisiones	Roberto	Episode: "Bloque de hielo"
2007	Pecados ajenos	Manuel	Antagonist
2008	Gabriel	Santori	7 episodes
2010	Grandes finales de telenovelas	Guillermo "Memo" López	TV movie documentary
2015	Nuestra Belleza Latina 2015	Himself	Celebrity guest; Season 9 (9th Gala)
2015	Demente criminal	Raimundo Acosta	Lead role/Antagonistic protagonist
2018	Mary for Mayor	Padre Armando	
2023	Luz de luna	Adan Cruces Lezama	Antagonist (season 3)
2023-24	Luz de esperanza	Adan Cruces Lezama	
