= Pobre juventud =

Mexican telenovela

- Genre: Telenovela; Romance; Drama
- Created by: Félix B. Caignet
- Written by: Marcia del Río
- Directed by: Pedro Damián
- Starring: Jaime Moreno; Gabriela Roel; Alberto Mayagoitia; Patricia Pereyra; Roberto Ballesteros; Antonio Brillas; Raúl Buenfil; Lolita Cortés
- Opening theme: Pobre Juventud by Sergio Facheli
- Country of origin: Mexico
- Original language: Spanish
- No. of episodes: 130

Production
- Executive producer: Carla Estrada
- Production locations: Mexico City, Mexico
- Cinematography: Manuel Ruiz Esparza
- Running time: 21-22 minutes
- Production company: Televisa

Original release
- Network: Canal de las Estrellas
- Release: September 23, 1986 – March 24, 1987

Related
- Cautiva; Pobre señorita Limantour

Pobre juventud (English title: Poor Youth) is a Mexican telenovela produced by Carla Estrada for Televisa in 1986. It is from an original story by Félix B. Caignet, adapted by Marcia del Río and directed by Pedro Damián.

Jaime Moreno and Gabriela Roel starred as adult protagonists, while Alberto Mayagoitía and Patricia Pereyra starred as young protagonists.

== Plot ==
Jorge is a rebellious and troubled young man who becomes interned in a reformatory where he discovers many of his colleagues in the same predicament, including Ponchado, Freddy, Muelas, El Chino and El Ruso. They all suffer cruelty and maltreatment at the hands of Remigio and Antonio, the sadistic guards.

Rosario, who works as a nurse at the reformatory, is a courageous young woman who is strongly opposed to the mistreatment and abuse daily dished out to the boys. Due to her kindness and great sense of justice, Rosario wins the sympathy of the delinquents there.

Jorge is a disturbed delinquent owing to the lack of affection at home, where he lives with his drunken father Evaristo, who only passes the time in an alcoholic stupor. On the other hand, there is Eduardo, a father/widower who mourns his only son Miguel, who died in an accident and who lives with his mother Eugenia.

One day Jorge and Ponchado decide to escape the harsh environment of the reformatory, masquerading as doctors. Jorge flees to the neighborhood where he lives, soliciting help from his neighbor, Teresa. Confronting Evaristo and asking him to take her son once and for all, the man becomes angry and denies Jorge is his own son, thus revealing that Jorge was adopted.

Then the vengeful man goes to the reformatory and claims that George (Jorge) is in the vicinity. Teresa gives money to the boy to flee and be saved. Evading the police, Jorge decides to hide in Eduardo's house by climbing the wall. Eduardo finds out, and also notices the huge resemblance to Michael, who he hides in his house.

Jorge Anselmo quickly befriends the family butler, but Eugenia turns reproachful, saying it is unacceptable that "a disgusting boy" is allowed to live at home.

Rosario does not support the sordid atmosphere of the reformatory and thanks to the help of Dr. Alberto Junquera resigns and goes to work in his office. Soon thereafter, she meets Eduardo and falls in love with him. Meanwhile, Jorge suffers the death of his girlfriend, Chelito from leukemia, but finds love again in Alejandra, eventually discovering the truth about his origins.

== Cast ==
- Jaime Moreno as Eduardo de la Peña
- Gabriela Roel as Rosario
- Alberto Mayagoitía as Jorge/Miguel de la Peña
- Patricia Pereyra as Alejandra
- Roberto Ballesteros as Néstor de la Peña
- Antonio Brillas as Matías
- Raúl Buenfil as Ponchado
- Lolita Cortés as Rebeca
- Ernesto Laguardia as Sergio "Muelas"
- Sebastián Ligarde as Freddy
- Irma Lozano as Josefina
- Bertha Moss as Eugenia de la Peña
- Guillermo Murray as Pablo
- René Muñoz as Anselmo
- Eugenia Avendaño as Magdalena
- Liliana Weimer as Rosina
- Manuel Guizar as Antonio
- Ana María Aguirre as Marina
- Mario García Gonzalez as Evaristo
- Moreno López as Higinio
- Arturo Lorca as Luis
- Mauricio Ferrari as Gustavo
- Eduardo Díaz Reyna as Flores
- Victor Vera as Teniente Verane
- Nailea Norvind as Gaby
- Mapy Cortés as Gabriela
- Luz Elena Silva as Martha
- Meche Barba as Elvira
- Ada Carrasco as Filomena
- Aurora Alonso as Casilda
- Maritza Olivares as Lupita
- Wally Barrón as Remigio
- Claudia Herfer as Chelito
- Gloria Alicia Inclán as Teresa
- Agustín López Zavala as Dr. Alberto Junquera
- Jorge Santos as Carlos
- Erika Magnus
- Chayanne as Rafael "El Ruso"
- Raúl Boxer as El Chino
- Rodolfo de Alejandre
- Octavio "Famoso" Gómez
- Estela Barona
- Mario del Río
- Eugenio Cobo
- Alicia Fahr
- Rafael del Villar

== Awards and nominations ==
Year	Award	Category	Nominee	Result
1987	5th TVyNovelas Awards	Best Young Lead Actress	Patricia Pereyra	Nominated
1987	5th TVyNovelas Awards	Best Young Lead Actor	Alberto Mayagoitía	Won
1987	5th TVyNovelas Awards	Best Male Revelation	Ernesto Laguardia	Nominated
1987	5th TVyNovelas Awards	Best Debut Actor	Sebastián Ligarde	Won
