= Rogelio Guerra =

Mexican actor (1936–2018)

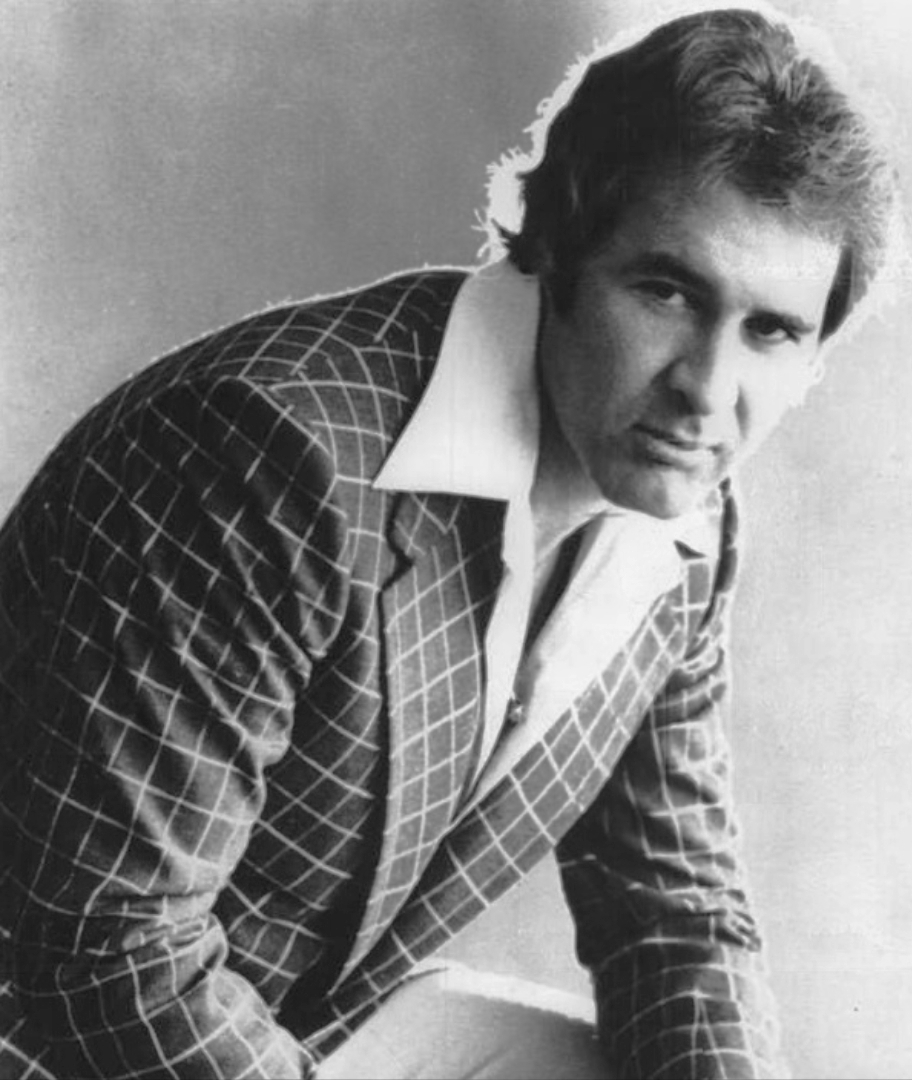
- Rogelio Guerra in 1978
- Born: Hildegardo Francisco Guerra Martínez; 8 October 1936; Aguascalientes, Aguascalientes, Mexico
- Died: 28 February 2018 (aged 81); Mexico City, Mexico
- Occupation: Actor
- Years active: 1964-2014
- Children: 5

Hildegardo Francisco Guerra Martínez (8 October 1936 – 28 February 2018), known artistically as Rogelio Guerra, was a Mexican actor. While primarily active in movies and television, he also was known for his work in theater and dubbing.

== Filmography ==
=== Selected films ===
| Year | Title | Role | Notes |
|---|---|---|---|
| 1964 | El Solitario | Rubén | |
| 1964 | El padrecito | Marcos | |
| 1966 | Tierra de violencia | Tony | |
| 1966 | Cuernavaca en primavera | Kiria's lover | Segment: "El mago" |
| 1966 | Gigantes planetarios | Marcos Godoy | |
| 1966 | El planeta de las mujeres invasoras | Marcos Godoy | |
| 1967 | Acapulco a go-gó | Jorge | |
| 1968 | La endemoniada | Pablo | |
| 1968 | Las pecadoras | El Gato | |
| 1968 | Las sicodélicas | Arsenio Junker Tres Alas | |
| 1969 | The Big Cube | Queen Bee's Bodyguard | Uncredited |
| 1969 | Veinticuatro horas de vida | Antonio Arriaga | |
| 1970 | El amor de María Isabel | Ernesto | |
| 1970 | Quinto patio | El Gato | |
| 1970 | El cínico | Edgardo Maldonado | |
| 1970 | Cruz de amor | Alfonso Pimentel | |
| 1971 | El sabor de la venganza | Joe Carson | |
| 1971 | La casa del farol rojo | El ídolo | |
| 1971 | Dos mujeres y un hombre | Rolando | |
| 1972 | La Martina | El Plateado | |
| 1973 | Volver, volver | Carlos Romero | |
| 1973 | Una rosa sobre el ring | El Indio Antonio | |
| 1973 | La tigresa | Luis Fierro | |
| 1974 | Las viboras cambian de piel | Prisionero escapado | |
| 1974 | Los Leones del ring contra la Cosa Nostra | Fernando | |
| 1976 | El hombre del puente | El Periodista | |
| 1979 | Tres mujeres en la hoguera | Alex | |
| 1982 | Una leyenda de amor | Prometido de Amanda | |
| 2005 | 7 mujeres, 1 homosexual y Carlos | Humberto | |
| 2005 | Hijas de su madre: Las Buenrostro | Mateo | |
| 2009 | El Agente 00-P2 | Jefe Lipo | |
| 2011 | El tren del no olvido | Rogelio | |

=== Television roles ===
| Year | Title | Role | Notes |
|---|---|---|---|
| 1964 | Cumbres Borrascosas | Unknown role | |
| 1966 | Más fuerte que tu amor | Unknown role | |
| 1966 | El derecho de nacer | Unknown role | |
| 1966 | Amor y orgullo | Unknown role | |
| 1967 | La casa de las fieras | Unknown role | |
| 1967 | Engáñame | Unknown role | |
| 1974 | Ha llegado una intrusa | Gabino | |
| 1974 | Canción de Navidad | Espíritu de Navidades pasadas | Television film |
| 1975 | Lo imperdonable | Álvaro | |
| 1976 | Los bandidos del río frío | Juan Robreño | |
| 1977 | La venganza | Sultán de Omán | |
| 1978 | Doménica Montero | José María Robles | |
| 1979 | Los ricos también lloran | Luis Alberto Salvatierra Izaguirre | |
| 1982 | Vanessa | Pierre de Saint-Germain | |
| 1982 | Chispita | Esteban | |
| 1983 | Amalia Batista | José Roberto | |
| 1984 | Principessa | Santiago | |
| 1985 | Vivir un poco | Gregorio Merisa Obregón | |
| 1986 | Chespirito | Himself | He only appears in the 42-minute episode Rogelio Guerra visita la vecindad. |
| 1987 | Los años perdidos | Unknown role | |
| 1990 | Ángeles blancos | Jorge | |
| 1993 | Los parientes pobres | Ramiro Santos | |
| 1995 | María José | Raúl Almazán | |
| 1996 | Nada personal | Comandante Fernándo Gómez Miranda | |
| 1998 | Azul Tequila | Adolfo Berriozábal | |
| 2008–2009 | Mañana es para siempre | Don Gonzalo Elizalde / Artemio Bravo | |
| 2009–2010 | Los exitosos Pérez | Franco Arana | |
| 2011 | Rafaela | Rafael | |
| 2012 | Amor Bravío | Daniel Monterde | |
| 2013 | Qué bonito amor | Carl Summers | |
| 2013 | Gossip Girl: Acapulco | Don César de la Vega | |
| 2013–2014 | Lo que la vida me robó | Lauro Mendoza | |

== Awards and nominations ==
Premios TVyNovelas
| Year | Category | Telenovela | Result |
| 1983 | Best Villain | Vanessa | Nominated |
| 1986 | Best Actor | Vivir un poco | Nominated |
| 1991 | Best Actor | Ángeles blancos | Nominated |
| 2010 | Best actor antagonistic | Mañana es para siempre | Nominated |
| 2012 | Best first actor | Rafaela | Nominated |
