= Luz de esperanza =

- Genre: Telenovela
- Created by: Yashim Bahamonde
- Written by: Abel Enríquez; Tito Céliz; Juan Pablo Bustamante; Malena Newton; Johuseline Porcel; Emmanuelle Kesch; Rita Solf
- Directed by: Michelle Alexander; Francisco Álvarez; Aldo Salvini; Julián Alexander; Sandro Méndez
- Starring: André Silva; Naima Luna
- Theme music composer: Miguel Laura
- Opening theme: "Júrame" by André Silva
- Composer: Juan Carlos Fernández
- Country of origin: Peru
- Original language: Spanish
- No. of seasons: 1
- No. of episodes: 65

Production
- Executive producer: Ivanna de la Piedra
- Producers: Hugo Coya; Adriana Álvarez; Michelle Alexander
- Camera setup: Multi-camera
- Production company: Del Barrio Producciones

Original release
- Network: América Televisión
- Release: 11 December 2023 – 13 March 2024

Related
- Luz de luna

Luz de esperanza is a Peruvian telenovela created by Yashim Bahamonde. It is a spin-off of Luz de luna. The telenovela aired on América Televisión from 11 December 2023 to 13 March 2024. It stars André Silva and Naima Luna.

== Plot ==
On the eve of the Christmas holiday, León goes on a trip with his daughter Luz to Villa Esperanza, where his mother lives. Upon arriving in Villa Esperanza, León is shocked to discover that the town's mayor, Manuel Soto, wants to seize his land and the children living there. He records a video and uploads it to social media, exposing the mayor's corrupt actions. Manuel vows to make León pay for his actions. While driving his car, which is having trouble, León crashes into a riverbank after fastening Luz's seatbelt. Following the accident, Luz begins searching for her father and while alone on the road, she is kidnapped by Ágatha, Manuel's wife, who is holding several orphaned children captive. León and Luz will have to overcome numerous obstacles to reunite and free themselves from the control of Manuel and Agatha.

== Cast ==
- André Silva as León Zárate Ruiz "El León de la Cumbia"
- Naima Luna as Luz Zárate Mujica / Luz de Souza Mujica
- Wendy Vásquez as Agatha Castro de Soto / de Cruces
- Alberick García as Manuel Soto
- Silvia Bardalez as Guillermina Huanca
- Stefano Salvini as Doctor Benito Orbegoso
- Andrea Alvarado as Profesora Ana Martina «Anita» Alfaro Huanca
- Martín Martínez as Petronilo "Petro" Quispe Villegas
- Areliz Benel as Eva Quiñones
- Cindy Díaz as Rebeca Fuentes
- Valentina Saba as Dr. Alicia Orbegoso
- Renato Bonifaz as Roberto "Bobby" Chipén
- Ale Müller as Elizabeth Sisniegas Luján / Elisa Rosario Ríos Huanta
- Ivanna Vernal as Juani Huallpa
- Gianfranco Bustíos as Santiago "Santi" Paredes
- Pablo Teruya as William "Willy" Lozano
- Sebastián Ligarde as Adán Cruces Lezama

== Reception ==
The telenovela premiered on 11 December 2023, positioning itself in second place in the audience during primetime with a percentage rating of 16.9 points, being surpassed by Al fondo hay sitio, also airing on América Televisión.
