= Patsy (actress) =

Mexican actress and singer (born 1963)

- Born: Patricia Pepping Valles; 1963 (age 62–63); Mexico City, Mexico
- Occupations: Actress, singer
- Years active: 1983–present

Patsy (born Patricia Pepping Valles on 1963 in Mexico City, Mexico) is a Mexican actress and singer.

== Biography ==
Patsy was born in 1963, in Mexico City, she is from American descent. When she was 7 years old, she moved with her family to the United States. In 1983 she had her debut in television. She had many roles in telenovelas such as Bodas de odio, El Camino Secreto, Pobre señorita Limantour, Mi Destino Eres Tú, Amar sin límites, Mar de amor, Amores verdaderos and Lo imperdonable.

In 1988, she released an LP titled "Patsy", which was not very successful. Two years later, she released the LP titled "Amor de medianoche". In 2004, Patsy returned to music with a third album also called "Patsy", being her latest record material to date.

== Personal life ==
She has three children: Kristel, Alexandra and Allan.

== Filmography ==
Year	Title	Role	Notes
1983/84	Bodas de odio	Angélica	Recurring role
1984/85	Sí, mi amor	Liz Gray	Recurring role
1985	Los años pasan	Fabiola Montesinos	Main antagonist
1986	El cachas de oro	Selena	
1986/87	El Camino Secreto	Bertha	Antagonist
1987	Pobre señorita Limantour	Doris Limantour	Antagonist
1987	El diablo, el santo y el tonto	Raquel	
1988	Papá soltero	Fabiola de la O	TV series
1989	La ley de las calles	Cecilia	
1990	Mi venganza		
1995	Santo Enredo	Esmeralda Toques	
2000	Mi Destino Eres Tú	Claudia	Supporting role
2006	Rebelde	Inés Alanís	Recurring role
2006/07	Amar sin límites	Liliana de Duarte	Special appearance
2009/10	Mar de amor	Lucía Galindez	Recurring role
2012/13	Amores verdaderos	Jocelyn Alcázar	Supporting role
2013	Como dice el dicho	Juliana	Episode:La suerte de la fea.
2015	Lo imperdonable	Salma Durán de Prado-Castelo	Supporting role
2017	El Bienamado	Donatella Neri	Recurring role

== Discography ==
- Patsy (1988)
- Amor de medianoche (1990)
- Patsy (2004)
