= Luz de luna (TV series) =

Peruvian telenovela

- Genre: Telenovela
- Created by: Yashim Bahamonde
- Written by: Yashim Bahamonde; Gerardo Ruiz Miñan; Claudia Sacha; Milagros Díaz; Joss Montenegro; Franco Iza; Jaime Nieto; Abel Enríquez; Bruno Alvarado; Johuseline Porcel; Juan Pablo Bustamante
- Directed by: Michelle Alexander; Sandro Méndez; Julián Alexander; Eric García; Josué Méndez
- Creative director: Micaela Varese Zimic
- Starring: André Silva; Vanessa Silva; Naima Luna
- Theme music composer: Miguel Laura
- Opening theme: "Júrame" by André Silva
- Composer: Juan Carlos Fernández
- Country of origin: Peru
- Original language: Spanish
- No. of seasons: 4
- No. of episodes: 517

Production
- Executive producer: Ivanna de la Piedra
- Producers: Hugo Coya; Adriana Álvarez; Michelle Alexander
- Camera setup: Multi-camera
- Production company: Del Barrio Producciones

Original release
- Network: América Televisión
- Release: 12 July 2021 – 8 April 2026

Related
- Luz de esperanza

Luz de luna is a Peruvian telenovela created by Yashim Bahamonde for América Televisión, that premiered on 12 July 2021. It stars André Silva, Vanessa Silva and Naima Luna. In July 2025, the series was renewed for a fourth and final season, which premiered on 9 September 2025. The final episode aired on 8 April 2026.

== Series overview ==
Season	Episodes	Originally released	
Season	Episodes	First released	Last released
1	129	12 July 2021	12 January 2022
2	125	25 May 2022	15 November 2022
3	124	11 April 2023	27 September 2023
4	143	9 September 2025	8 April 2026

=== Season 1 (2021–22) ===
León is a young singer who dreams of starting his own cumbia band. He finds support and inspiration for his dream in Luna, a young woman from an upper-class background who becomes his most loyal fan. However, their budding romance is interrupted by Eus, who falls in love with Luna and will do everything in his power to keep her away from León, ultimately separating them permanently. He tricks Luna into falling into his trap, and she agrees to marry him after becoming disillusioned with León, believing he abandoned her to her fate, unaware that she is expecting his child. Several years later, León fulfills his dream of becoming a nationally known cumbia singer, after embarking on a national tour with his orchestra, while Luna, after a long time, decides once again to declare her love for him and at the same time reveal a big secret. However, in the course of this, she is interrupted by Eus who, in the middle of an argument, decides to kill Luna by pushing her out of the moving car after hearing her say that she never stopped loving León and that she was going to confess the truth that she had a daughter with him. Luna's death leaves León in deep depression, but soon discovers he had a daughter with Luna named Luz, a charming little girl. León will fight to recover the lost time with Luz, but to do so he will first have to confront Eus and his allies. León will receive help from Luna, who appears to him as a ghost to guide him in uncovering the truth about her death. Subsequently, as a last wish of Luna before finally departing to heaven completely transformed into an angel, León meets Alma, who surprisingly is physically identical to Luna, who spiritually causes Alma to come into León's life, so that she becomes his new love interest and helps him save his daughter Luz from Eus's evil.

=== Season 2 (2022) ===
After León gets engaged to Alma, in the middle of the wedding ceremony, he is left at the altar, so he decides to leave all his sufferings in the past and instead continue his life only as Luz's father, leaving music aside. However, he meets Bella Luna, a sweet young woman from Callao. Luz goes to the cemetery to visit her mother's grave, leaving a letter in which she asks her to send someone to help bring happiness back to her father. Luna grants her daughter's request and spiritually sends the letter flying to Bella's mother's grave, who receives the letter and comes into León's life, and upon meeting, a new love arises in the life of the cumbia singer. Eus is released from prison thanks to his father becoming president of Perú. Eus takes advantage of the power his father has to recover Luz from León's parental custody, and continues harming and taking revenge on both León and his family and friends. Later, Alma returns to help León regain paternal custody of Luz, which causes some tension between Bella and León, after Alma confesses to León that she is still in love with him and that it was a mistake to have left him at the altar. But finally, Alma tells León and Bella that they make a beautiful couple and that she does not intend to interfere in their relationship, yet at the same time she secretly appears mortified, showing she has a big secret that could affect Bella and León's romance in the future.

=== Season 3 (2023) ===
León marries Bella, an event that ends in tragedy after Chubi's death at Eus's hands while trying to protect León. Following this tragedy, León's orchestra receives an invitation to participate in a cumbia festival in Mexico, where they meet Adán. He offers them a job with Imperium Music, along with a lucrative contract that supposedly will make them internationally famous, but which in reality only masks Adán's ambitions against León and his orchestra. After this musical alliance, Adán decides to settle in Lima and begins to prepare his scheme.

=== Season 4 (2025–26) ===
The season begins with León reminiscing about his childhood, when he was friends with Rubén Aquije, who would later become his best friend. Fast forward to the present, León learns of Rubén's death, which turns out to have been a homicide. He travels to Villa Esperanza to attend Rubén's funeral and say his final goodbyes. Gabriel prevents León from seeing Rubén in his coffin and blames him for his mother's death, harboring a rivalry with León without knowing the facts. Gabriel is married to Martina, León's childhood sweetheart, who recalls the promise of marriage they both made as children, a memory that threatens to disrupt his present. Meanwhile, Luz starts secondary school and seeks to stop being seen solely as "the daughter of the King of Cumbia" and to forge her own identity, even if it means standing up to her father.

== Cast ==
Actor	Character	Seasons			
Actor	Character	1	2	3	4
André Silva	León Zárate Ruiz / El León de la Cumbia	Main	Main	Main	Main
Vanessa Silva	Luna Mujica Camet de Souza	Main	Recurring	Recurring	
Vanessa Silva	Dr. Alma Hermoza / Alma Mujica Camet	Main	Main	Main	Main
Naima Luna	Luz Zárate	Main	Main	Main	Main
Nicolás Galindo	Eusebio "Eus" de Souza Ferreira / Eusebio "Eus Sánchez Ferreira	Main	Main	Main	Main
Mayella Lloclla	Bella Luna del Mar / La Sirena de la Cumbia		Main	Main	
Liliana Trujillo	Yolanda Ruiz	Main	Main	Main	Main
Alfonso Santistevan	Ciro Mujica Labarthe	Main	Main	Main	Main
Luis José Ocampo	Leopoldo "Polo" Condor	Main	Main	Main	
Daniela Feijoó	Mabel Gil Urbina	Main	Main	Recurring	
Daniela Feijoó	Gloria Gil Urbina		Guest	Main	
José Luis Ruiz	Rolando Sánchez Pastor "Chubi"	Main	Main	Main	
Miguel Álvarez	Eusebio de Souza Jáuregui	Main	Main	Main	
María José Vega	Diana Sofía Martínez Salazar de Joya	Main	Main	Main	Recurring
Gonzalo Molina	Dr. Carlos Manrique Cervantes	Main	Main	Main	
Gonzalo Molina	Leonardo Rivera				Main
Gustavo Borjas	Marvin Salvador Olivares Vílchez	Main	Main	Main	
Laly Goyzueta	Dr. Patricia Ferreira Bustamante		Main	Main	Recurring
Óscar Carrillo	Ramiro Zevallos	Recurring	Main	Voice	
Gilberto Nué	Pedro Luna		Main	Guest	
José Dammert	Simón Medrano / El Zorro de la Cumbia		Main		
Priscila Espinoza	Dr. Luciana Maquiavelo			Main	
Sergio Gjurinovic	Professor Francisco Deza Arrieta			Main	
Renato Bonifaz	Roberto "Bobby" Chippén / El Nuevo León de la Cumbia			Recurring	Main
Úrsula Mármol	Doña Celia	Main			
Macla Yamada	Rosa "Rosita" Bustos	Main	Recurring	Recurring	
Ítalo Maldonado	Fernando Viera	Main	Recurring	Recurring	
Carlos Casella	Herbert Rodríguez	Main	Recurring	Main	
Juan Carlos Pastor	Officer José Luis Joya Peña	Main	Recurring	Main	Recurring
Daniel Cano	Manuel Hernández	Main			
Walter Ramírez	Walter Constantino "Tino"	Main			
Jorge Bardales	Hugo		Recurring	Main	Recurring
Diego Salinas	Sebastián Leyva		Recurring	Main	Recurring
Juan Pablo Abad	Charlie Díaz Herrera / Charlie Mujica Ruiz		Main	Main	
Sebastián Barreto	Gabriel "Gabrielito" Viera Rumiche	Main	Guest		
Sebastián Ligarde	Adán Cruces Lezama			Main	
Emilram Cossío	Salvador Zárate	Recurring			
Emilram Cossío	Claudio Zárate				Main
Marisol Aguirre	Bárbara Camet Labarthe				Main
Javier Valdés	Alexis Altamirano "el Gringo"				Main
Renato Rueda	Gabriel Zárate / El Jaguar de la Cumbia				Main
Juan Carlos Rey de Castro	Luciano Benavides				Main
Wendy Vásquez	Daniela Arias / Ágatha Castro				Main
Zoe Fernández	María Fernanda "Mafer" Benavides				Main
Ivanov Chamulak	Piero Benavides				Main
Jesús Neyra	Professor Rodolfo Pacora				Main
Fernanda Llanos	Camila Pacora Carrasco				Main
Salvador Ballón	Thiago Pacora Carrasco				Main
Alejandra Saba	Josefina Carrasco				Main
María Grazia Polanco	Martina García				Main
Thiago Vernal	Antonio "Tony" Chippén				Main

== Production ==
In December 2021, the series was renewed for a second season, which began filming on 21 April 2022. The season premiered on 25 May 2022. In December 2022, the series was renewed for a third season, which premiered on 11 April 2023. In November 2023, a spin-off series titled Luz de esperanza was announced. The series premiered on 11 December 2023. In July 2025, it was announced that the series would have a fourth and final season. The season premiered on 9 September 2025.

== Spin-off ==
In November 2023, the development and premiere of a new spin-off telenovela titled Luz de esperanza was confirmed, which would serve as a sequel to the story of Luz de luna. The series is centered on León and Luz, who are preparing for their trip for the Christmas holidays, but end up suffering a car accident that separates them and leaves them on separate paths. It stars André Silva and Naima Luna, and features Sebastián Ligarde as the antagonist, reprising their roles as León Zárate, Luz Zárate, and Adán Cruces respectively. It also includes appearances by other actors such as Silvia Bardalez, Andrea Alvarado, Stefano Salvini, Valentina Saba, and Areliz Benel, and features new main villains played by Alberick García, Wendy Vásquez, Martín Martínez, and Gabriel González.
