= Areliz Benel =

Peruvian actress (born 1988)

- Born: Areliz Benel Bolaños; October 28; Peru
- Occupation: Actress
- Years active: 2011–present

Areliz Benel Bolaños (born 28 October 1988) is a Peruvian actress, best known for her role as Shirley Gonzales in the TV series Al Fondo Hay Sitio.

Benel was born in Lima. Since 2008 she has been studying at the Escuela Nacional Superior de Arte Dramático. She also studying at the Instituto Peruano de Publicidad.

In 2012, she competed in dance reality show El Gran Show.

== Filmography ==
Television
Year	Title	Role	Notes
2011—2016	Al Fondo Hay Sitio	Shirley Gonzales Pachas	Regular role
2012	El Gran Show	Contestant	5th place
2023	Luz de esperanza	Eva Quiñones	
