= Ramón Pons =

Spanish film and television actor

- Born: 13 October 1940; Valencia, Spain
- Died: 21 April 2014 (aged 73); Madrid, Spain
- Occupation: Actor
- Years active: 1966–2014

Ramón Pons (13 October 1940 – 21 April 2014) was a Spanish film, stage and television actor. He appeared in more than 15 films from 1970 on.

== Filmography ==
=== Film ===
- El espacio vacío (2009)
- Los abrazos rotos (2009)
- Escarabajos asesinos (1984)
- Han violado a una mujer (1982)
- El virgo de Visanteta (1979)
- El sacerdote (1978)
- La dudosa virilidad de Cristóbal (1977)
- El avispero (1976)
- Una abuelita de antes de la guerra (1975)
- Los caballeros del botón de ancla (1974)
- Juegos de sociedad (1974)
- Ceremonia sangrienta (1973)
- Murder in a Blue World (1973)
- Experiencia prematrimonial (1972)
- Los farsantes del amor (1972)
- Señora casada necesita joven bien dotado (1971)
- Un, dos, tres, al escondite inglés (1970)

=== Television ===
- Policías, en el corazón de la calle (2000)
- El comisario (2000)
- Médico de familia (1999)
- Periodistas (1999)
- Entre naranjos (1998)
- El súper (1997–1998)
- Éste es mi barrio (1996)
- Canguros (1996)
- Los ladrones van a la oficina (1994)
- Le Gorille (1990)
- Clase media (1987)
- La voz humana (1986)
- La comedia dramática española (1986)
- Cuentos imposibles (1984)
- El amor ajeno (1983)
- Teatro breve (1980)
- Novela (1975)
- Noche de teatro (1974)
- Ficciones (1972–74)
- Hora once (1970–72)
- Escritores en televisión (1968)
- Estudio 1 (1967–81)
- Historias para no dormir (1966)
