= La indomable (Mexican TV series) =

1987 Mexican telenovela

- Genre: Telenovela; Romance; Drama
- Created by: Hilda Morales de Allouis; Carlos Romero
- Written by: Kary Fajer; Lei Quintana
- Directed by: Beatriz Sheridan; Lorenzo de Rodas
- Starring: Leticia Calderón; Arturo Peniche; Elvira Monsell; Alfredo Leal; María Rivas; Alonso Echánove
- Theme music composer: José Claro García; Cecilio Cupido
- Opening theme: Mis blancas mariposas by Bebu Silvetti
- Country of origin: Mexico
- Original language: Spanish
- No. of episodes: 105

Production
- Executive producer: Julissa
- Producer: Mapat L. de Zatarain
- Cinematography: Ernesto Arreola; Juan Osorio
- Running time: 21-22 minutes per episode
- Production company: Televisa

Original release
- Network: Canal de las Estrellas
- Release: April 27 – September 18, 1987

Related
- Herencia maldita; Pobre señorita Limantour; Alma rebelde (1999)

La Indomable (English title: The indomitable) is a Mexican telenovela produced by Julissa for Televisa in 1987. The story portrays a female version of the play "The Taming of the Shrew" by English playwright William Shakespeare.

Leticia Calderón and Arturo Peniche starred as protagonists, while Elvira Monsell and Juan Carlos Serrán starred as antagonists.

== Plot ==
María Fernanda Villalpando is a beautiful, rich, but arrogant, proud woman who lives on a large family hacienda known as Villa Paraíso, in the company of her father Gonzalo and her friend Cristina. María Fernanda is engaged to Gerardo, a wealthy businessman. She finds out that he is cheating on her, so she breaks off her engagement. Miguel Echánove, a young and humble engineer who is visiting with the Villalpando's falls in love with Maria Fernanda's beauty. Though hurt by Gerardo's betrayal, she does not correspond to Miguel's feelings for her but decides to use him by marrying him to get revenge on Gerardo.

Miguel finds out he was deceived by María Fernanda and becomes enraged. He moves her to his small town and makes her life miserable. Sofía, an unscrupulous woman who has always been in love with Miguel, takes advantage of this situation and seeks to retain his love at all costs. But while María Fernanda schemed against Miguel, she comes to the realization that she has truly fallen in with him. Admitting to her mistakes, she tries to show Miguel sincere repentance and admits her true feelings for him. The road is not easy as Gerardo and Sofía will try to recover their respective ex-partners at any cost.

== Cast ==
- Leticia Calderón as María Fernanda Villalpando
- Arturo Peniche as Miguel Echánove
- Elvira Monsell as Sofia Galindo
- Alfredo Leal as Gonzalo Villalpando
- María Rivas as Doña Adela Echánove
- Juan Carlos Serrán as Gerardo San Lucas
- Claudia Ramírez as Nabile
- Alonso Echánove as Pedro
- Carmen Delgado as Cristina
- Manuel Gurría as Tomás
- Jacaranda Alfaro as Jacaranda del Valle
- Miguel Suárez as Salcedo
- Queta Carrasco as Pancha
- José Luis Cordero as Ruben
- Mario Rezares as José
- Ayerim de la Pena as Alina Echánove (child)
- Cristian Ramírez as Grillo
- Federico Elizondo
- Rocío Sobrado
- Mapat L. de Zatarain, Production Manager
- Sergio Jurado
- Luis de León

== Awards ==
Year	Award	Category	Nominee	Result
1987	5th TVyNovelas Awards	Best Young Lead Actress	Leticia Calderón	Won
