= Cautiva (TV series) =

- Genre: Telenovela; Drama
- Created by: Luis Moreno
- Written by: Marc Rostland
- Directed by: Manolo García
- Starring: Julio Alemán; Lucy Gallardo; Otto Sirgo; Magda Guzmán; Claudia Córdova; Cecilia Toussaint; Andrea Ferrari
- Country of origin: Mexico
- Original language: Spanish
- No. of episodes: 130

Production
- Executive producer: Francisco Burillo
- Cinematography: Gabriel Vázquez Bulman
- Production company: Televisa

Original release
- Network: Canal de las Estrellas
- Release: March 25 – September 19, 1986

Related
- El ángel caído; Pobre juventud

Cautiva (English title:Captive) is a Mexican telenovela produced by Francisco Burillo for Televisa in 1986. It starred Julio Alemán, Lucy Gallardo, Otto Sirgo, Magda Guzmán, Claudia Córdova and Cecilia Toussaint.

== Plot ==
Javier and Amanda Arellano are an exemplary couple living in Monterrey with his two daughters, Patricia and Diana. Or at least, appear to be copies, because in reality the marriage is broken. Living apart for a long time, and Javier just looking affairs with other women while Amanda tolerate the situation for fear of damaging their daughters.

While Patricia is a young scholar and correctly attached to her mother, her sister Diana is rebellious and spoiled, spends all her time lazing and devising mischief with her friend Marcela and feeling extreme adoration for her father. The friendship with her friend Marcela is completed when you discover that Diana killed Marcela's father.

Javier is proud of Diana, for his character and determination are a reflection for him, in the absence of a son he always wanted but could never hit Amanda. The submissive Amanda just looking to reconcile with her husband because of the love he has always had. However, when she learns that her husband's mistress is his secretary Graciela, suffers a nervous breakdown, which greatly concerned with Patricia and Aurelia, his faithful servant that has always accompanied.

== Cast ==
- Julio Alemán as Javier Arellano
- Lucy Gallardo as Amanda Arellano
- Otto Sirgo as Daniel
- Magda Guzmán as Aurelia
- Claudia Córdova as Diana Arellano
- Cecilia Toussaint as Patricia Arellano
- Andrea Ferrari as Marcela
- Silvia Manríquez as Graciela
- Julio Monterde as Andrés
- Sara Guasch as Elvira
- Eduardo Palomo as Enrique
- Miguel Ángel Ferriz as Gilberto
- Miguel Macía as Jacinto
- Luis Couturier as Marcelo
- Lucero Lander as Mariana
- Ernesto Laguardia as Sergio
- Rocío Yaber as Alicia
- Alejandra Peniche as Gloria
- Eduardo Liñán as Roldán
- Mónica Prado as Sonia
- Pablo Salvatella as Aguilar
- Benjamín Islas as Hernán
- Bárbara Córcega as Carmen
- Blanca Torres as Esperanza
- Antonio Ruiz as Pepe Toño
- Humberto Herrán as Bermeo
- Guillermo Zarur as Rodrigo
- Miguel Gutiérrez as Manuel
- Claudia Ramírez as Gabriela
- Tere Cornejo as Raquel
- Juan Carlos Barreto as Alfonso
- Isaura Espinoza
- Paco Mauri
- Roberto Spriu
- Ilse as Herself
- Ivonne as Herself
- Mimi as Herself
- Constantino Costas
- Enrique Barrera Merino.Ernesto
