= La pasión de Isabela =

Mexican telenovela

- Genre: Telenovela
- Created by: Carlos Olmos; Carlos Tellez
- Written by: Carlos Olmos
- Directed by: Carlos Tellez
- Starring: Ana Martín; Héctor Bonilla; Beatriz Aguirre; Claudio Brook
- Country of origin: Mexico
- Original language: Spanish
- No. of episodes: 200

Production
- Executive producer: José Octavio Cano
- Production locations: Mexico City, Mexico
- Cinematography: Gabriel Vazquez Bulman

Original release
- Network: Canal de las Estrellas
- Release: April 30, 1984 – February 8, 1985

Related
- El maleficio; Tú o nadie

La pasión de Isabela (English title: The passion of Isabela) is a Mexican telenovela produced by José Octavio Cano for Televisa in 1984.

Ana Martín and Héctor Bonilla starred as the protagonists, while Beatriz Aguirre and Claudio Brook starred as the antagonists.

== Cast ==
- Ana Martín as Isabela
- Héctor Bonilla as Adolfo Castanedo
- Beatriz Aguirre as Celina
- Claudio Brook as Bruno
- Delia Casanova as Natalia
- Roberto Cobo as Maestero of ceremonies
- Gemma Cuervo as Zoraida
- Irma Dorantes as Azucena
- Margarita Gralia as Odette
- Alfonso Iturralde as Sebastián
- Silvia Derbez as Angela
- Manuel Landeta
- Lilia Aragón
- Raúl Meraz as Castillo
- Ana Ofelia Murguía as Cristina
- Martha Navarro as Matilde
- Lilia Prado as Perla
- Adrián Ramos as Faustino
- Anna Silvetti as Regina
- Susana Kamini as Ruth
- Roberto D'Amico as Ramon
- Tito Vasconcelos as Goyo
- Rosa Carmina as Herself
- Yolanda Montes as Herself

== Awards ==
Year	Award	Category	Nominee	Result
1985	3rd TVyNovelas Awards	Best Telenovela of the Year	Carlos Téllez	Nominated
1985	3rd TVyNovelas Awards	Best Actress	Ana Martín	Nominated
1985	3rd TVyNovelas Awards	Best Actor	Héctor Bonilla	Nominated
1985	3rd TVyNovelas Awards	Best Female Revelation	Anna Silvetti	Won
1985	3rd TVyNovelas Awards	Best Male Revelation	Alfonso Iturralde	Nominated
