= Amalia Batista =

Mexican telenovela

- Genre: Telenovela; Drama
- Created by: Inés Rodena
- Written by: Carlos Romero; María Antonieta Saavedra
- Directed by: Gilberto Macin
- Starring: Susana Dosamantes; Rogelio Guerra; Roberto Ballesteros; Nuria Bages; Leticia Calderón; Leticia Perdigón
- Country of origin: Mexico
- Original language: Spanish
- No. of episodes: 265

Production
- Executive producer: Valentín Pimstein
- Cinematography: Manuel Ruiz Esparza
- Production company: Televisa

Original release
- Network: Canal 2
- Release: September 14, 1983 – September 21, 1984

Related
- Ileana (1977); Prisionera de amor (1994)

Amalia Batista is a Mexican telenovela produced by Valentín Pimstein and directed by Gilberto Macin for Televisa in 1982. It is an original story by Inés Rodena and adaptation by Carlos Romero and María Antonieta Saavedra.

Susana Dosamantes, Rogelio Guerra and Roberto Ballesteros starred as protagonists, while Alicia Encinas starred as main antagonist.

== Cast ==
- Susana Dosamantes as Amalia Batista
- Rogelio Guerra as Lic. José Roberto Covarrubias
- Roberto Ballesteros as Macario
- Alicia Encinas as Viviana Durán
- Nuria Bages as Margarita de Covarrubias
- Leticia Calderón as Leticia
- Leticia Perdigón as Reyna
- Alicia Rodríguez as Doña Ana Mercedes
- Armando Calvo as Don Daniel
- Gregorio Casal as Augusto
- Dolores Camarillo as Pachita
- María Teresa Rivas as Doña Esperanza
- Inés Morales as Irma Covarrubias
- Luis Uribe as Esteban Covarrubias
- Ada Carrasco as Petra
- Aurora Clavel as Adela
- José Elías Moreno as Jorge
- Connie de la Mora as Diana
- Maribella García as Marcela
- Magda Karina as Iris
- Rubén Rojo as Manuel
- Mario Sauret as Jaimito
- Beatriz Ornela as Sor María
- Nubia Palacio as Eugenia
- Julieta Montiel as Serafina
- Alberto Gavira as Juancho
- Patricia Myers as Rosa María
- Marta Resnikoff as Úrsula
- Jorge del Campo as Marcos
- Virginia Gutiérrez as Clementina
- Mónica Miguel as Matilde
- Maritza Olivares as Jazmín
- Antonio Brillas as Dr. Brambila
- Fernando Ciangherotti as Leticia's fiance
- Oscar Sánchez
- Carmen Belén Richardson
- Jacarandá Alfaro

== Awards ==
Year	Award	Category	Nominee	Result
1985	3rd TVyNovelas Awards	Best Telenovela of the Year	Valentín Pimstein	Nominated
1985	3rd TVyNovelas Awards	Best Antagonist Actor	José Elías Moreno	Nominated
1985	3rd TVyNovelas Awards	Best Female Revelation	Leticia Calderón	Nominated
1985	3rd TVyNovelas Awards	Best Debut Actress	Leticia Calderón	Won
