= Lucía Guilmáin =

Mexican actress (1938–2021)

- Born: Lucía Gutiérrez Puerta; January 5, 1938; Mexico City
- Died: February 15, 2021 (aged 83); Mexico City
- Occupation: actress

Lucía Gutiérrez Puerta, known by her stage name Lucía Guilmáin (January 5, 1938 – February 15, 2021), was a Mexican actress.

== Biography ==
Her career was between 1965 and 2016 She worked in theater, movies, and television. Guilmáin was known for her roles in Las fuerzas vivas (1975), Length of War (1976) and Darker Than Night (2014).

Lucía Gutiérrez Puerta was born in Mexico City on January 5, 1938. She was married to the commentator Raúl Orvañanos, with whom she had a son. Guilmáin died on February 15, 2021, in Mexico City, aged 83, from COVID-19.
