= Pobre señorita Limantour =

Mexican telenovela

- Genre: Telenovela; Drama
- Created by: Inés Rodena
- Written by: Carlos Romero; Valeria Phillips; Marcela Galván
- Directed by: Pedro Damián
- Starring: Víctor Cámara; Ofelia Cano; Úrsula Prats; Thalía; Roberto Ballesteros; Alicia Rodríguez
- Opening theme: Instrumental by José Antonio "Potro" Farías
- Country of origin: Mexico
- Original language: Spanish
- No. of episodes: 150

Production
- Executive producer: Carla Estrada
- Cinematography: Manuel Ruiz Esparza
- Running time: 21-22 minutes (episodes 1-127); 41-44 minutes (episodes 128-150)

Original release
- Network: Canal de las Estrellas
- Release: March 25 – October 23, 1987

Related
- Regina Carbonell (1972); El amor no tiene precio (2005)

Pobre señorita Limantour (English title: Poor Miss Limantour) is a Mexican telenovela broadcast on El Canal de las Estrellas in 1987. Was starring Víctor Cámara in his debut in Mexican telenovelas, Ofelia Cano in her only starring in soap operas and Manuel Saval and Úrsula Prats in antagonistics. It also marked the debut of Thalía in Mexican telenovelas. It is based on the soap opera "Regina Carbonell" Inés Rodena original.

== Plot ==
Regina Limantour is an honest young woman who lives with her aunt and her sister Doris. Bernarda is a cruel woman having fun humiliating and mocking Regina, calling her "Poor Miss Limantour". On the death of Bernarda, Regina is animated by Pilar a woman who has taken a liking to the girl, to get better and become what she craves, a nurse. Regina listens to her advice and finally manages to get her career going. Regina starts working in a hospital where she meets a future doctor: Julio Adrián Montesinos, a rich young man who falls in love despite the warnings of her coworkers, and Julio Adrian has a reputation for womanizing and irresponsible.

However, their love will face many hurdles, the biggest of which is named Greta Torreblanca, an unscrupulous woman who becomes obsessed with Julio Adrián and will do anything just to separate it from Regina. In this love triangle Armando, a young doctor who falls for Regina and honestly struggles to win her love, because she believes that Julio Adrián does not deserve that, true to its bad reputation, like to make fun of women adds.

Same story in the same dramatic intensity, which are protagonists Doris's sister Regina, and a wealthy man Augusto Soledad married father of two children, Dina and Pepito develop. Doris is a young, ambitious, manipulative and as cruel as was his aunt Bernarda becomes Augusto lover who constantly demands money and gifts to tell you to leave your family and marry her. Infidelity causes family break Augusto, Augusto and Soledad are no longer spoken, and Dina, a whimsical young girl blindly idolizes his father and despises the efforts of his mother to try to keep her family together.

A catastrophe befalls the family when her father discovers that Dina is having an affair with his half-sister. Soledad had an affair in the past which resulted in the birth of Doris. When the secret comes to light, the impact is so great that it causes her father to become seriously ill and unleashes a tragedy.

== Cast ==
- Ofelia Cano as Regina Limantour
- Víctor Cámara as Julio Adrián Montesinos
- Úrsula Prats as Greta Torreblanca Halcon
- Thalía as Dina
- Roberto Ballesteros as Germán Limantour
- Alicia Rodríguez as Soledad
- Silvia Derbez as Pastora
- Aurora Molina as Pilar
- Patsy as Doris
- Ana Luisa Peluffo as Mariana Halcon Vda. De Torreblanca
- Ezequiel Alarcón Cisneros Nico
- Manuel Saval as Armando Perea
- Beatriz Sheridan as Bernarda
- Julieta Egurrola as Antonieta Altamar Barragán Vda. del Castillo/Flora Altamar Barragán
- Fabiola Elenka Tapia as Clarita
- Juan Peláez as Augusto
- Rafael Rojas as Alfonso
- Nerina Ferrer as Sor Angelina
- Christopher Lago as Pepito
- Raúl Meraz as Raymundo
- Rebeca Mankita as Caty
- Marcela Páez as Luz María
- Fernanda Ruizos as Valeria Limantour
- Queta Lavat
