= El Camino Secreto =

Mexican telenovela

- Genre: Telenovela; Drama
- Created by: José Rendón
- Written by: José Rendón
- Directed by: José Rendón
- Starring: Daniela Romo; Salvador Pineda; Carlos Ancira; Gabriela Rivero; Leticia Calderón; Pedro Armendáriz Jr. Claudio Brook
- Theme music composer: Juan Gabriel
- Opening theme: "De mí enamórate" by Daniela Romo
- Country of origin: Mexico
- Original language: Spanish
- No. of episodes: 120

Production
- Executive producer: Emilio Larrosa
- Running time: 21–22 minutes
- Production company: Televisa

Original release
- Network: Canal de las Estrellas
- Release: September 1, 1986 – February 13, 1987

Related
- La gloria y el infierno; El precio de la fama; La verdad oculta (2006)

El Camino Secreto (English: The Secret Path) is a Mexican telenovela produced by Emilio Larrosa for Televisa in 1986.

Daniela Romo and Salvador Pineda starred as the protagonists, while Claudio Brook, Patsy and Mar Castro starred as main antagonists. Leticia Calderón, Gabriela Rivero and Carlos Ancira co-starred in supporting roles, with Ancira receiving special praise.

It was the last acting role for Carlos Ancira, eight months before his death from a brain tumor on October 10, 1987.

== Plot ==
Mario and Santiago are both in love with the same woman, Martha. Martha becomes pregnant by Santiago and together they raise two daughters, Gabriela and Julieta. Mario and Santiago are involved in a diamond smuggling ring headed by Adolfo Ávila, who murders Martha and blackmails both Mario and Santiago into taking the blame for it. Santiago flees with his young daughters, using his skills as an actor and master of disguise to assume the new identity of Fausto Guillén and the girls grow up unaware of his past as Santiago.

Twenty years later, the now wealthy Mario discovers that he is dying, so he seeks out Santiago and asks him to take his place. But Adolfo murders the ailing Mario and Santiago is forced to hastily adopt Mario's identity in order to throw Adolfo off track, while keeping from the girls that he is not Fausto, but Santiago. Meanwhile, Gabriela meets Santiago's adopted son, David, and they fall in love with each other. But Gabriela's physical resemblance to her mother Martha attracts Adolfo's attention, placing everyone's lives in deadly danger.

== Cast ==
- Daniela Romo as Gabriela Guillén
- Salvador Pineda as David Genovés
- Carlos Ancira as Santiago Guzmán / Fausto Guillén / Mario Genovés
- Gabriela Rivero as Julieta Guillén
- Leticia Calderón as Alma
- Pedro Armendáriz Jr. as Alejandro Faidella
- Claudio Brook as Adolfo Ávila
- Fernando Sáenz as Carlos Ávila
- Pilar Pellicer as Yolanda
- Arsenio Campos as Roberto Zárate
- Arturo Benavides as Félix
- Patsy as Berta
- Fidel Garriga as Abelardo
- Guy De Saint Cyr as Marcos
- Mar Castro as Susana
- Gonzalo Sánchez as Pancholete
- Damián Alcázar as José Luis
- Alfredo Sevilla as Adriano
- Jorge Fegán as Captain Raymundo Floriani
- Ana Patricia Rojo as Paulina Faidella

== Awards and nominations ==
Year	Award	Category	Nominee	Result
1987	5th TVyNovelas Awards	Best Telenovela	Emilio Larrosa	Nominated
1987	5th TVyNovelas Awards	Best Actress	Daniela Romo	Nominated
1987	5th TVyNovelas Awards	Best Actor	Salvador Pineda	Nominated
1987	5th TVyNovelas Awards	Best Antagonist Actor	Claudio Brook	Nominated
1987	5th TVyNovelas Awards	Best Leading Actor	Carlos Ancira	Won
1987	5th TVyNovelas Awards	Best Female Revelation	Gabriela Rivero	Won
1987	5th TVyNovelas Awards	Best Original Story or Adaptation	José Rendón; Emilio Larrosa	Nominated
1987	5th TVyNovelas Awards	Best Direction	José Rendón	Nominated
