= Conflictos de un médico =

Mexican telenovela

- Genre: Telenovela
- Created by: Caridad Bravo Adams
- Directed by: Tony Carbajal
- Starring: Frank Moro; Úrsula Prats
- Country of origin: Mexico
- Original language: Spanish
- No. of episodes: 20

Production
- Executive producer: Ernesto Alonso
- Cinematography: Karlos Velázquez
- Running time: 30 minutes

Original release
- Network: Canal de las Estrellas
- Release: 1980

Conflictos de un médico (English title: Conflicts of a doctor) is a Mexican telenovela produced by Ernesto Alonso for Televisa in 1980.

== Cast ==
- Frank Moro
- Úrsula Prats
- Miguel Manzano
- Olivia Bucio
- Victoria Ruffo
- Armando Coria
- Arturo Adonay
- Laura Garza
- José Roberto
- Miguel Macía
- Erika Buenfil
