= Ricardo Blume =

Peruvian actor and theater director (1933–2020)

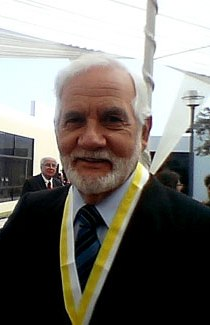
- Blume in 2012
- Born: Ricardo Cristóbal Blume Traverso; August 16, 1933; Lima, Peru
- Died: October 30, 2020 (aged 87); Mexico City, Mexico
- Occupation: Actor
- Years active: 1959–2015
- Known for: Tio Guero from María la del Barrio

Ricardo Cristóbal Blume Traverso (16 August 1933 – 30 October 2020) was a Peruvian actor and theatre director who developed most of his career in Mexico. His work encompassed theatre, cinema and TV. He was the founding teacher of the Teatro de la Universidad Católica (TUC) at the Pontifical Catholic University of Peru.

== Filmography ==
=== Films ===
Year	Title	Role	Notes
1965	Intimidad de los parques		
1967	Mi secretaria está loca, loca, loca	Alberto Ugarteche	
1972	Los enamorados		
1974	El primer paso, de la mujer		
1974	Pobre niño rico		
1974	Los perros de Dios		
1974	Con amor de muerte		
1975	Detrás de esa puerta	Barreiro	
1979	La mujer perfecta	Luciano	
1986	Malabrigo	Luciano	
1996	Sobrenatural	Dr. Riojas	
1996	Sor Juana Ines de la Cruz entre el cielo y la razón'		Voice only
2000	Angélica María - 50 años de trayectoria artística	Himself	Television film
2004	Conejo en la luna	Dr. Parra	
2006	Fuera del cielo	Senador García Luna	
2006	Mezcal	Ismael	
2007	Miércoles		Short film
2007	Quemar las naves	Padre Miguel	
2013	The Last Call	Eduardo	Nominated — Ariel Award for Best Supporting Actor
2014	Viejos amigos		

=== Television ===
Year	Title	Role	Notes
1960	Kid Cristal		
1962	La casa de las lilas		
1962	Tierra embrujada		
1964	Cumbres Borrascosas	Heathcliff	Lead role
1964	Doña Bárbara		
1965	Corazón herido		
1969	Simplemente María	Roberto Carida / Antonio Ramos	
1969	Mentira sentimental		
1971	Muchacha italiana viene a casarse	Juan Francisco de Castro	Lead role
1972	Las fieras	Leonard	
1973	Entre brumas	Paul Anderson	
1974	Mundo de juguete	Mariano Salinas	
1978	Viviana	Luis Treviño	
1979	Verónica		
1980	Pelusita	Chong Li/Claudio	
1992	Carrusel de las Américas	Don Huamán	Co-lead role
1994	Marimar	Gobernador Fernando Montenegro	
1994-2004	Mujer, casos de la vida real	Various roles	7 episodes
1995	María la del Barrio	Don Fernando de la Vega	
1995	Caminos cruzados	Olegario	
1997	Los hijos de nadie	Don Chuy	
2000	Ramona	Ruy Corona	
2001	Mujer bonita	Damián	
2003	Amor real	Hilario Peñalver	
2004	Inocente de ti	Armando Dalmacci	
2006	Heridas de amor	Leonardo Altamirano	
2007	Amor sin maquillaje		
2007	La historia detrás del mito	Himself	Episode: "Mundo de juguete"
2008-2009	Cuidado con el ángel	Patricio	
2010	Gritos de muerte y libertad	Virrey Juan Ruiz de Apodaca	"La última conjura" (Season 1, Episode 10)
2010	Grandes finales de telenovelas	General Don Hilario Peñalver y Beristáin	
2012	Como dice el dicho	Miguel	"No tiene la culpa el indio" (Season 2, Episode 22)
2014-2015	Muchacha italiana viene a casarse	Mario Bianchi	2 episodes

== Awards ==
- Premio Bravo - Asociación Internacional de Periodistas de México
- CIRCE
- Distinción of Teatro de la Universidad Católica.
- Doctor Honoris Causa of Pontifical Catholic University of Peru (2006).
- Mi vida en el teatro of Centro Mexicano del Instituto Internacional de Teatro de la UNESCO.
- Medalla Juan Pablo y Vizcardo y Guzmán - Congreso of Republica of Peru (2002).
