= Manuel Saval =

Mexican actor

- Born: Juan Manuel Ruiz Saval; June 22, 1956; Hermosillo, Sonora, Mexico
- Died: June 23, 2009 (aged 53); Mexico City, Mexico
- Other name: Manuel Zaval
- Occupations: Stage actor Film actor Television actor
- Years active: 1975–2007
- Spouse: Martha Gallegos (m. 1983)
- Children: Francisco (son)
- Parent(s): Manolita Saval and Manuel Ruiz

Juan Manuel Ruiz Saval (June 22, 1956 – June 23, 2009) was a Mexican stage, film and television actor who appeared in over twenty telenovelas. His best known role was opposite Victoria Ruffo in the telenovela Simplemente Maria.

== Biography ==
Saval was the son of film actress and opera singer Manolita Saval and Manuel Ruiz. In 1983 he married Martha Eugenia Gallegos, with whom he had a son, Francisco.

=== Illness and death ===
In 2007 he was diagnosed with laryngeal cancer and had to retire from show business in order to seek surgery and treatment. While hospitalized for treatment in mid-2008, he contracted a rare infection associated with pneumonia and his condition worsened. In late December 2008, while in recovery from tracheal surgery at the Instituto Nacional de Cancerología in Mexico City, it was announced that recovery was going well and he might be able to return home for the holiday season. But by the third week of May, 2009, Saval had returned to the hospital and was reported to be in critical condition.

On his birthday in 2009, a gathering held in his honor was arranged by Adal Ramones and attended by his many friends. Because of his ill health, Saval was unable to attend, but a video connection was established between his home and the gathering. His friends remembered him for his great kindness and as always being an elegant person.

He died on June 23, 2009, one day after his 53rd birthday, after a three-year battle with cancer of the larynx, which he attributed to his smoking.

== Career ==
Saval began his career in show business working on graphic novels. His screen debut was in the 1976 film El esperado amor desesperado with Sonia Furi and Ofelia Guilmain, and late in the 70s he performed in theater with his mother. His television debut was as Jorge in the 1980 telenovela Corazones sin rumbo.

== Filmography ==
=== Television ===
- Corazones sin rumbo (1980) as Jorge
- Espejismo (1981) as Juan José
- Lo que el cielo no perdona (1982)
- Guadalupe (1984) as Roberto
- Los años felices (1984) as Rodolfo
- Principessa (1984) as Reynaldo
- Los años pasan (1985) as Rodolfo
- Juana Iris (1985)
- Muchachita (1986) as Chucho
- La pobre Señorita Limantour (1987) as Armando
- Simplemente María (1989) as Juan Carlos del Villar
- Mágica juventud (1992) as Javier
- María la del Barrio (1995) as Óscar Montalbán
- La antorcha encendida (1996) as José Manuel Fuentes
- Mujer, casos de la vida real (1998-2007)
- El diario de Daniela (1999) as Andres Zamora
- Rosalinda (1999) as Alfredo Del Castillo
- Carita de ángel (2000-2001) as Father Gabriel Larios
- Cómplices al rescate (2002) as Rolando Del Valle
- ¡Vivan los niños! (2002–2003) as Dr. Fernando Molina
- Corazones al límite (2004) as Osvaldo Madrigal
- Hospital el paisa (2004) as Dr. Manuel
- Bajo el mismo techo (2005) as Carlos
- Sueños y caramelos (2005) as Augusto Monraz

==== Film ====
- El esperado amor desesperado (1976)

==== Theater ====
- Papacito piernas largas
- Gigi
- Ah que muchachita
