= Length of War =

1976 film

- Directed by: Gonzalo Martínez Ortega
- Written by: Heriberto Frias; Gonzalo Martínez Ortega
- Starring: Víctor Alcocer
- Cinematography: Rosalío Solano
- Release date: 21 December 1976
- Running time: 142 minutes
- Country: Mexico
- Language: Spanish

Length of War (Spanish: Longitud de guerra) is a 1976 Mexican drama film directed by Gonzalo Martínez Ortega. The film was selected as the Mexican entry for the Best Foreign Language Film at the 49th Academy Awards, but was not accepted as a nominee.

== Cast ==
- Víctor Alcocer
- José Luis Almada
- Mario Almada
- Pedro Armendáriz Jr.
- Fernando Balzaretti
- Elsa Benn
- Narciso Busquets
- Roberto Cañedo
- Armando Coria
- Pancho Córdova
- Eugenia D'Silva
- Ángel de la Peña García
- Alma Delfina
- Lucía Guilmáin

== See also ==
- List of submissions to the 49th Academy Awards for Best Foreign Language Film
- List of Mexican submissions for the Academy Award for Best Foreign Language Film
