= Entre brumas =

Mexican telenovela

- Genre: Telenovela
- Created by: Marissa Garrido; Fernanda Villeli
- Directed by: Julio Castillo
- Starring: Celia Castro; Ricardo Blume; Rita Macedo; Macaria; María Rubio; Guillermo Murray
- Opening theme: "Entre brumas" by Lupita D'Alessio
- Country of origin: Mexico
- Original language: Spanish

Production
- Executive producer: Ernesto Alonso

Original release
- Network: Canal de las Estrellas
- Release: 1973

Related
- Amor ajeno (1983)

Entre brumas, is a Mexican telenovela produced by Ernesto Alonso for Televisa in 1973. It stars Celia Castro, Ricardo Blume and Rita Macedo.

== Plot ==
The story is set in England, where Deborah Winters is a very repressed woman, dominated by his father and who has grown up in the shadow of her beautiful but cruel friend, Linda Anderson. This always has taken away to Deborah everything she wants, including Paul Anderson, who is in love with Deborah.

== Cast ==
- Celia Castro as Deborah Winters
- Ricardo Blume as Paul Anderson
- Rita Macedo as Linda Anderson
- Macaria as Doris
- Narciso Busquets as Jean Louis
- Miguel Manzano as Charlie
- María Rubio as Susan
- Alicia Montoya as Sarah
- Otto Sirgo as Enrico Petrini
- Lucía Guilmáin as Mary
- Guillermo Murray as Robert Green
- José Luis Jiménez as Sir James Winters
- Alfonso Meza as Oscar Anderson
- Gloria Guzmán as Sra. Lester
- Héctor Sáez as Bill
- Malena Doria as Elizabeth
- Ignacio Rubiell as Ruby
- Tita Grieg as Ángela
- Roberto Antúnez as Ricardo
- José Antonio Ferral as Tom
