= Guadalupe (Mexican TV series) =

- Genre: Telenovela
- Created by: Abel Santa Cruz
- Written by: Maria Antonieta Saavedra
- Directed by: Rafael Banquells Jorge Sanchez Fogarty
- Starring: Alma Delfina; Jaime Garza; Oscar Morelli; Rebecca Rambal; July Furlong; Elsa Cárdenas; Aurora Molina
- Country of origin: Mexico
- Original language: Spanish

Production
- Executive producer: Valentín Pimstein
- Production locations: Mexico City, Mexico
- Cinematography: Manuel Ruiz Esparza
- Running time: 21–22 minutes

Original release
- Network: Canal de las Estrellas
- Release: January 16 – October 19, 1984

Related
- El amor ajeno; Te amo; Guadalupe (1972)

Guadalupe is a Mexican telenovela produced by Valentín Pimstein for Televisa in 1984. Is an adaptation of the Argentine telenovela of the same name produced in 1972.

Alma Delfina and Jaime Garza starred as the protagonists, while Oscar Morelli and Rebecca Rambal starred as the antagonists.

== Cast ==
- Alma Delfina as Guadalupe
- Jaime Garza as Francisco Javier/Raúl
- Oscar Morelli as Leopoldo
- Rebecca Rambal as Elvira
- July Furlong as Sara
- Elsa Cárdenas as Leonor
- Aurora Molina as Rufina
- Ana Silvia Garza as Teresa
- Magda Karina as Chayo
- Nailea Norvind as Nani
- Sylvia Suárez as Rosalia
- Nayelli Zaldivar as Luisita
- Jose Roberto Hill as Gerardo
- Flor Trujillo as Aurora
- Gerardo Paz as Pedro
- Elvira Monsell as Yolanda
- Carmen Belén Richardson as Dominga
- Porfirio Bas as Carlos
- Cristina Peñalvert as Marisol
- Christoper Lago as Arturito
- Manuel Saval as Roberto
- Antonio Brillas as Father Florencio

== Awards ==
Year	Award	Category	Nominee	Result
1985	3rd TVyNovelas Awards	Best Antagonist Actress	Rebeca Rambal	Won
1985	3rd TVyNovelas Awards	Best Young Lead Actress	Alma Delfina	Nominated
1985	3rd TVyNovelas Awards	Best Young Lead Actor	Jaime Garza	Nominated
1985	3rd TVyNovelas Awards	Best Child Performance	Nayelli Saldívar	Won
