= Pelusita =

Mexican telenovela

- Genre: Telenovela
- Created by: Arturo Moya Grau
- Written by: Valeria Philips
- Directed by: Manuel Ruíz Esparza
- Starring: Macaria; Rafael del Río
- Country of origin: Mexico
- Original language: Spanish
- No. of episodes: 21

Production
- Executive producer: Valentín Pimstein
- Cinematography: Rafael Banquells
- Editor: Alejandro Frutos
- Running time: 30 minutes
- Production company: Televisa

Original release
- Network: Canal de las Estrellas
- Release: August 15, 1980 – January 2, 1981

Pelusita (English title: Fluff) is a Mexican telenovela produced by Valentín Pimstein for Televisa in 1980.

== Cast ==
- Macaria as Pelusita
- Rebeca Gómez as Pelusita ('child)
- Rafael del Río as Esteban
- Saby Kamalich as Beatriz
- Juan Antonio Edwards as Ricardo
- Jose Roberto Hill as Patricio
- Ricardo Blume as Chang Li/Claudio
- Maria Clara Zurita as Pastora
- Eugenio Cobo as Dr. Zúñiga
- Tomas I. Jaime as Father Gabriel
- Abraham Stavans as Camarón
- Enrique Hidalgo as Julio
- Enrique Becker as Elias
- Antonio Brillas as Santamaria
- Barbara Gil as Rosa
- Maleni Morales as Emilia
