= Aprendiendo a amar =

Mexican telenovela

- Genre: Telenovela
- Created by: Caridad Bravo Adams; Fernanda Villeli
- Directed by: Alfredo Saldaña
- Starring: Susana Dosamantes; Ernesto Alonso; Lupita D'Alessio; Susana Alexander
- Opening theme: Aprendiendo a amar by Lupita D'Alessio
- Country of origin: Mexico
- Original language: Spanish
- No. of episodes: 200

Production
- Executive producer: Ernesto Alonso
- Running time: 30 minutes

Original release
- Network: Canal de las Estrellas
- Release: 1980 – 1981

Related
- Ambición (1973)

Aprendiendo a amar (English title: Learning to Love) is a Mexican telenovela produced by Ernesto Alonso for Televisa in 1980.

== Cast ==
- Susana Alexander as Cristina
- Ernesto Alonso as César
- Lupita D'Alessio as Jimena
- Susana Dosamantes as Teresa
- Columba Domínguez as Carmelita
- Celia Manzano as Lupe
- Miguel Manzano as Mario
- Carlos Bracho as Alfredo
- Tony Bravo as Adrian
- Raymundo Capetillo as Hugo
- Mercedes Pascual as Amanda
- Erika Buenfil as Natalia
- Héctor Sáez as Ricardo
- Fabio Ramírez as Walter Simpson
- Flor Trujillo as Susy del Rio
- Ricardo Marti as Alejandro
- Francisco Avendaño
- Toni Saldana
- Miguel Macia as Pedro
