= Los años felices =

Mexican telenovela

- Genre: Telenovela; Romance; Drama
- Created by: Arturo Moya Grau
- Written by: Carlos Romero
- Directed by: Enrique Lizalde; Jorge Sánchez-Fogarty
- Starring: Enrique Lizalde; Alma Muriel; Lupita Ferrer; Laura Zapata; Manuel Saval; Roberto Ballesteros
- Opening theme: Valse Classique by Frank Mills
- Country of origin: Mexico
- Original language: Spanish
- No. of episodes: 115

Production
- Executive producer: Valentín Pimstein
- Cinematography: Leopoldo Terrazas; Manuel Ruiz Esparza
- Running time: 30 minutes
- Production company: Televisa

Original release
- Network: Canal de las Estrellas
- Release: November 12, 1984 – April 19, 1985

Related
- La fiera; Juana Iris; Los años pasan (1985)

Los años felices (English title:The happy years) is a Mexican telenovela produced by Valentín Pimstein and directed by Enrique Lizalde and Jorge Sánchez-Fogarty for Televisa in 1984. Is the prequel of the 1985 telenovela Los años pasan.

Alma Muriel and Enrique Lizalde starred as protagonists, Lupita Ferrer, Laura Flores and Manuel Saval starred as co-protagonists, while Laura Zapata, Rebeca Rambal, Juan Ignacio Aranda and Martín Barraza starred as antagonists.

== Cast ==
- Enrique Lizalde as Adrián
- Alma Muriel as Eva
- Lupita Ferrer as Marcela
- Laura Zapata as Flora
- Manuel Saval as Rodolfo
- Roberto Ballesteros as Angelo
- Rebeca Rambal as Silvia
- Miguel Córcega as Elias
- Laura Flores as María T.
- Azucena Rodríguez as Blanca
- Mariana Levy as Nancy
- Juan Ignacio Aranda as Jorge
- Demián Bichir as Tomas
- Beatriz Moreno as Fresia
- Germán Robles as Renato
- Héctor Ortega as El Padrino
- Ricardo Cortés as Hugo
- Consuelo Frank as Ruperta
- Luis Manuel Pelayo as Fernandez
- Alicia Encinas as Celeste
- Arturo Lorca as Maradona
- Antonio Henaine as Cirilo
- José Luis Duval as Avuña
- Marta Zamora as Elisa
- Aracely Guizar as Lucia
- Rosario Monasterio as Alicia
- Luis Gatica as Joel
- Alfredo Garcia Marquez as Rosales
- Javier Díaz Dueñas as Counter
- Imperio Vargas as Clarisa
- Claudio Báez as Gabriel
- Carlos Becerril as Napoleón
- Ausencio Cruz as Carlos
- Nuria Bages
- Antonio Farré
- Kenia Gazcon
- Laura Heredia as Leonor
- Imperio as Clarisa

== Awards ==
| Year | Award | Category | Nominee | Result |
|---|---|---|---|---|
| 1985 | 3rd TVyNovelas Awards | Best Young Lead Actress | Laura Flores | Nominated |
| 1985 | 3rd TVyNovelas Awards | Best Young Lead Actor | Manuel Saval | Nominated |
| 1985 | 3rd TVyNovelas Awards | Best Male Revelation | Manuel Saval | Won |
