= Úrsula Prats =

Mexican actress

- Born: Úrsula Prats; July 26, 1960 (age 65); Mexico
- Occupation: Actress

Úrsula Prats (born July 26, 1960), is a Mexican actress. She played Jacqueline Moncada de Lerdo de Tejada in Un gancho al corazón, and Luisa Duran in Tormenta en el paraíso.

== Biography ==
Úrsula Prats began her career in the soap opera Secretos de confesión, then played Maura in the soap opera Tú o nadie with Lucía Méndez. The actress began her career when she was invited to conduct a variety show, she gave publicity to the artists. Later on, Ernesto Alonso saw her and offered her first role.

"I loved making Monte calvario with Edith González, acting alongside Jacqueline Andere in Quiéreme siempre, that soap opera gave me a lot of satisfactions as an actress", said Úrsula.

In the soap opera Un gancho al corazón she shared credit with Otto Sirgo, Sebastián Rulli, and Ana Martín. In 2009 she worked in the soap opera Mi Pecado playing the role of Matilda - aunt of the villain Lorena.

== Filmography ==
Film
Year	Film	Role	Notes
1979	357 Magnum		Film
1980	El barrendero	Lupita	Film
1984	No vale nada la vida		Film
1985	Judicial 2		Film
1986	Contrabando y muerte		Film
Television
Year	Title	Role	Notes
1980	Conflictos de un médico	Patricia Miranda	Protagonist
1980	Secreto de confesion	Carmela	Co-protagonist
1980	Al final del arcoiris	Alejandra	Co-protagonist
1982	Quiereme siempre	Giuliana	Main antagonist
1983	Pobre señorita Limantour	Greta Torreblanca	Main antagonist
1983	Amor ajeno	Ursula	Main antagonist
1985	Tu o nadie	Maura	Main antagonist
1988	Monte calvario	Olivia	Main antagonist
1998	Azul tequila	Hilda	Main antagonist
1999	Besos prohibidos	Dora Elena	Supporting role
2001	Como en el cine	Nieves Borja	Main antagonist
2006–2008	La hija del mariachi	Gabriela de Sánchez	Supporting role
2007	Tormenta en el paraíso	Luisa Linares Vda. de Durán	Antagonist
2008–2009	Un gancho al corazón	Jacqueline Moncada de Lerdo de Tejada	Supporting role
2009	Mi pecado	Matilde Mendizábal	Antagonist
2010–2011	Triunfo Del Amor	Roxana De Alba	Antagonist
2012–2013	Como dice el dicho	Estrella / Celia	TV series
