= Fernando Balzaretti =

Mexican actor

- Born: June 10, 1946; Mexico City, Mexico
- Died: September 5, 1998 (aged 52); Mexico City, Mexico

Fernando Balzaretti (June 10, 1946 – September 5, 1998) was a Mexican actor.

== Career ==
Balzaretti began his acting career in the 1960s and by the time of his death in 1998 had acted in at least 40 films, 21 telenovelas and 136 plays. He was also a professor of performing arts at the National Autonomous University of Mexico.

== Awards ==
- Ariel Award for Best Supporting Actor (1988) in Muelle Rojo.
- Virginia Fábregas Medal, 1994.

== Selected filmography ==
- Length of War (1976)
- Mina, Wind of Freedom (1977)
- Broken Flag (1978)
- Días dificiles (1988) (Ariel nominee for Best Actor)
- Muelle rojo (1988) (Ariel winner for Best Supporting Actor)
- Kino (1994) (Ariel nominee for Best Supporting Actor)

== See also ==
- Mexican people of Italian descent
