= Los años pasan =

Mexican telenovela

- Genre: Telenovela; Drama
- Created by: Inés Rodena
- Written by: Carlos Romero
- Directed by: Jorge Sánchez Fogarty
- Starring: Laura Flores; Manuel Saval; Guillermo Murray; Patsy; Martha Roth; Isabela Corona
- Opening theme: L'Amour en héritage by Vladimir Cosma
- Country of origin: Mexico
- Original language: Spanish
- No. of episodes: 100

Production
- Executive producer: Valentín Pimstein
- Cinematography: Leopoldo Terrazas
- Running time: 21-22 minutes
- Production company: Televisa

Original release
- Network: Canal de las Estrellas
- Release: May 20 – October 4, 1985

Related
- El engaño (1968); Viviana (1978); Los años felices (1984); Valentina (1993); Camila (1998); La esposa virgen (2005)

Los años pasan (English title: The Years Go By) is a Mexican telenovela produced by Valentín Pimstein for Televisa in 1985. It is an original story by Inés Rodena and adapted by Carlos Romero. It is a sequel to another Pimstein-produced telenovela, Los años felices, as well as a new version of Rodena's radionovela La Galleguita.

Laura Flores and Manuel Saval starred as protagonists, while Patsy starred as main antagonist.

== Cast ==
- Laura Flores as María
- Manuel Saval as Rodolfo
- Guillermo Murray as Alejandro
- Patsy as Fabiola Montesinos
- Martha Roth as Mercedes
- Isabela Corona as Apolonia
- Luis Uribe as Gustavo
- Fernando Ciangherotti as Armando
- Bárbara Gil as Úrsula
- Rubí Ré as Virginia
- Alberto Inzúa as Sr. Tovar
- Aurora Clavel as Chole
- Aurora Molina as Petra
- Ernesto Laguardia as Cuco
- Bolivar Hack as Luciano
- Ada Carrasco as Lencha
- Jorge Santos as Arturo
- Eduardo Díaz Reyna as Felipe
- Beatriz Moreno as Fresia
- Mónica Prado
- Gerardo Murguía
- Maria Fernanda Morales
- Nadia Haro Oliva
- Gloria Morell
- Ricardo Cervantes

== Awards ==
Year	Award	Category	Nominee	Result
1986	4th TVyNovelas Awards	Best Antagonist Actress	Patsy	Nominated
