= Beatriz Sheridan =

Mexican actress and director

- Born: Elizabeth Ann Sheridan Scarbrough; 25 June 1934; Mexico City, Mexico
- Died: 30 April 2006 (aged 71); Mexico City, Mexico
- Education: University of Missouri
- Occupations: Actress, director
- Years active: 1958–2005
- Awards: Silver Ariel Award as Best Supporting Actress (1986) (1987)

Elizabeth Ann Sheridan Scarbrough, better known as Beatriz Sheridan (25 June 1934 – 30 April 2006), was a Mexican actress and director. A pioneer of the Mexican telenovelas and prominent figure of the Mexican theater of the 20th century, she was also a teacher of dramatic technique for television.

== Biography ==
=== Early life ===
Elizabeth Ann Sheridan Scarbrough was born on 12 July 1923 in Mexico City, of a British mother and Mexican father of Irish descent. She had 6 brothers and one sister. She studied philosophy and letters at the University of Missouri in the United States. Back in Mexico, she studied at Mexico City College. She was a distinguished student of the famous Japanese director and instructor Seki Sano, to whom she became an assistant in the direction of a number of theatrical montages.

=== Theater ===
Beginning in 1961, Sheridan participated as an actress and protagonist on the Mexican stage for four years. She worked with Alejandro Jodorowsky in montages like The lesson, Penelope, The sonata of the specters, Fando y Lis and The opera of Order, among others. From 1963, she was part of numerous Mexican classical theater ensembles. Some of her works include The Trojan Women (1963), directed by Jose Solé, La moza del cántaro (1964), directed by Jose Luis Ibáñez, Los secuestradores de Altona (1965), directed by Rafael López Miarnau, Strange interlude, directed by Xavier Rojas, Doce y una trece, by Juan José Gurrola, Mudarse por mejorarse (1966), by José Luis Ibáñez, Diálogo entre el amor y un viejo (1966), also by Ibáñez, Por Lucrecia, directed by Héctor Gómez, La noche de los asesinos directed by Juan José Gurrola, A Streetcar Named Desire (1968), directed by Dimitro Sarrás and Ah, los días felices (1977) by Manuel Montoro.

In 1987 she performed what would probably be her most memorable theatric performance, RW Fassbinder's The Bitter Tears of Petra von Kant, directed by Nancy Cárdenas. The poet Pita Amor wrote an essay entitled The Bitter Tears of Beatriz Sheridan about her impressive performance.

Sheridan was also a pioneer and director of live readings of poetry and literature. Octavio Paz would demand the presence of Sheridan for every reading of his poems.

=== Films ===
Sheridan made her film debut in 1963 in the film version of Euripides' The Trojan Women, directed by Sergio Véjar and opposite Ofelia Guilmáin, Mercedes Pascual, and other great actresses. In 1965 Sheridan participated in the film Tajimara, of Juan Jose Gurrola, with Pilar Pellicer and Claudio Obregón. In 1967 she participated in the film Pedro Páramo, directed by Carlos Velo, next to John Gavin and Ignacio López Tarso. In 1969 she was part of the cast of Arturo Ripstein's Los recuerdos del porvenir. In 1980 she appeared in the film Misterio, by Marcela Fernández, for which she won the Silver Ariel Award from the Mexican Film Academy in the category of Best Female Co-Performance.

Sheridan's most remembered cinematographic work was arguably in Confidencias (1983), by Jaime Humberto Hermosillo, based on the novel Pétalos perennes by Luis Zapata, and acting alongside María Rojo. For this performance she was awarded the Silver Ariel Award in the category of Best Actress.

Sheridan's last film work was in the award-winning film Gaby: A True Story, by Luis Mandoki, starring Norma Aleandro and Liv Ullmann.

=== Television ===
Sheridan was a pioneer of Mexican telenovelas. She participated in Senda prohibida, the first melodrama produced in Mexico. From that point onward she participated in numerous television productions. Other television work included La constitución (1970), with María Félix, where she interpreted the historical persona of Carmen Serdán; La venganza (1977), next to Helena Rojo and Gabriel y Gabriela (1982), with Ana Martín. She also participated in the telenovelas Vivir un poco (1985), with Angélica Aragón, Alondra (1995), with Ana Colchero and Gonzalo Vega, and Amor real (2003), with Adela Noriega.

Her last work as an actress was in the telenovela Contra viento y marea (2005), where she partnered with the actress Azela Robinson.

=== Director ===
In the last two decades of her life, Beatriz Sheridan stood out as the director of numerous Mexican melodramas. Her unique techniques in television influenced a wide range of notable Mexican actors. Her first directing appearance was through famed Chilean producer Valentín Pimstein in the telenovela Vivir un poco, where she served as director of dialogue. Her first project as a leading director was in the telenovela La indomable (1987), produced by Julissa. Her most memorable work as a director is the famous television trilogy known as La Trilogía de las Marías, starring singer Thalía: María Mercedes (1992), Marimar (1994), and María la del barrio (1995). These telenovelas were a huge international success.

=== Death ===
Beatriz Sheridan died on Sunday, 30 April 2006 at 4:00 am in her apartment in the Colonia San Miguel Chapultepec in Mexico City of a heart attack, at 71 years of age. Her ashes were scattered in the Caribbean Sea, facing the beaches of Cozumel Island, Quintana Roo, Mexico, one of the actress's favorite places where she owned a house.

== Selected filmography ==
- Senda prohibida (1959)
- Pedro Páramo (1967)
- La Generala (1970)
- The Trojan Women (1972)
- Victoria (1972)
- Muñeca Rota (1979)
- Misterio (1980)
- Confidencias (1982)
- Gabriel y Gabriela (1983)
- Vivir un poco (1985)
- Gaby: A True Story (1987)
- Alondra (1995)
- Vivan los Niños (2002)
- Amor real (2003)
- Contra viento y marea (2005)

=== Director ===
- Monte Calvario (1986)
- Rosa Salvaje (1987)
- Simplemente Maria (1989)
- Mi pequeña Soledad (1990)
- María Mercedes (1993)
- Marimar (1994)
- Maria la del Barrio (1995)
- Esmeralda (1997)
- La usurpadora (1998)
- Rosalinda (1999)
- La Intrusa (2001)
