= Gonzalo Martínez Ortega =

Mexican film director

- Born: Gonzalo Martínez Ortega; 27 April 1934; Camargo, Chihuahua, Mexico
- Died: 2 June 1998 (aged 64); Cuernavaca, Morelos, Mexico
- Other names: Chalo
- Occupation(s): Actor, director, screenwriter, producer
- Years active: 1973-1996

Gonzalo Martínez Ortega (27 April 1934 – 2 June 1998) was a Mexican actor, director, screenwriter and producer. He directed thirteen films and television series between 1973 and 1996.

== Filmography ==
Year	Title	Notes
1970	Crates	Actor
1970	Homenaje a Leopoldo Méndez	Screenwriter
1971	Siempre hay una primera vez	Screenwriter
1973	El principio	Director & Screenwriter
1976	Longitud de guerra	Director & Screenwriter
1978	El jardín de los cerezos	Screenwriter & Director
1978	Del otro lado del puente	Director
1980	El Noa Noa	Director
1980	Del otro lado del puente	Director
1981	El testamento	Director
1981	Que viva Tepito!	Actor
1982	Es mi vida	Director & Screenwriter
1982	Semana santa entre los mayos	Producer
1983	El guerrillero del norte	Actor
1985	El hombre de la mandolina	Screenwriter & Director
1986	La gloria y el infierno	Producer & Director
1986	El padre Gallo	Director
1987	Tal como somos	Director
1987	Tal como somos	Director of Photography
1989	Luz y sombra	Director of Photography
1989	Luz y sombra	Director & Producer
1990	La fuerza del amor	Producer
1994	El vuelo del águila	Director
1996	La Antorche Encendida	Director
