= Enrique Álvarez Félix filmography =

This is a complete filmography of Mexican actor Enrique Álvarez Félix. He appeared in many Mexican films and telenovelas.

His most famous film is La Casa del Pelícano, and his best known telenovela is Marisol; this was his last work. He played heroes on such telenovelas as Rina and Colorina.

Year	Title	Role
1960	La mujer dorada	Alfonso
1964	Casa de Vecindad	
1965	Simon of the Desert	Brother Matías
1965	Alma de mi alma	
1965	Valería	
1965	Los Cuervos están de luto	Enrique
1965	Las dos Elenas	Víctor
1966	Corazón salvaje	Renato Duchamp
1966	Casa de Mujeres	"The Son"
1966	Los jinetes de la bruja	Daniel
1967	Entre sombras	
1967	Estafa de amor	Daniel
1967	Los caifanes	Jaime de Landa
1968	Requiem por un canalla	
1969	The Picture of Dorian Gray	Dorian Gray
1970	Crónica de un cobarde	
1970	Narda o el verano	Max
1970	Tres noches de locura	
1971	El profesor particular	
1971	La primavera de los escorpiones	
1972	Las gemelas	Arturo
1973	El amor tiene cara de mujer	Fernando Ugalde
1973	El Monasterio de los Buitres	Emilio
1974	El manantial del milagro	
1977	Rina	Carlos Augusto
1978	La Casa del Pelícano	Nilo Ramírez
1978	Pecado de amor	Alberto
1980	Colorina	Gustavo Adolfo
1982	Lo que el cielo no perdona	Marcelo
1984	Tú eres mi destino	Eugenio
1987	Tal como somos	Miguel
1988	De pura sangre	Leonardo
1989	Luz y sombra	Lafarga
1992	La sonrisa del diablo	Salvador Esparza
1996	Marisol	Leonardo
