= List of Amor de barrio episodes =

Amor de barrio (English title: Love from the Hood) is a Mexican telenovela produced by Roberto Hernández for Televisa. It is a remake of the 1979 Mexican telenovela, Muchacha de barrio and Paloma produced in 1975.

== Series overview ==
Season	Episodes	Originally aired	
Season	Episodes	First aired	Last aired
1	17	June 8, 2015	June 30, 2015
1	23	July 1, 2015	July 31, 2015
1	21	August 3, 2015	August 31, 2015
1	22	September 1, 2015	September 30, 2015
1	22	October 1, 2015	October 30, 2015
1	6	November 2, 2015	November 8, 2015

== Episodes ==
=== June 2015 ===
No. overall	No. in season	Title	Original release date
1	1	"¡Paloma y Daniel se conocen!"	June 8, 2015
2	2	"¡La sangre llama y el corazón contesta!"	June 9, 2015
3	3	"¡Un mágico encuentro se avecina!"	June 10, 2015
4	4	"¡Catalina saca las garras!"	June 11, 2015
5	5	"¡Paloma y Daniel casi se besan!"	June 12, 2015
6	6	"¡Despiertan los celos de Daniel!"	June 15, 2015
7	7	"¡Paloma llora por la salud de Blanca Estela!"	June 16, 2015
8	8	"¡El corazón de Blanca Estela no puede más!"	June 17, 2015
9	9	"¿Descubrirá Raúl quién es Monalisa en realidad?"	June 18, 2015
10	10	"¡Paloma le dará el sí a Rodrigo!"	June 19, 2015
11	11	"¡Comenzará la guerra por el corazón de Paloma!"	June 22, 2015
12	12	"¡Daniel busca nido cerca de Paloma!"	June 23, 2015
13	13	"¡Daniel tendrá un día de perros!"	June 24, 2015
14	14	"¡El amor arrasará con todo!"	June 25, 2015
15	15	"¡Compran el nido de Paloma!"	June 26, 2015
16	16	"¡Le planchan su traje a Rosa!"	June 29, 2015
17	17	"¡Este arroz ya se coció!"	June 30, 2015

=== July 2015 ===
No. overall	No. in season	Title	Original release date
18	18	"¡Se armó la gorda en el barrio!"	July 1, 2015
19	19	"De amor, perdón y maldades"	July 2, 2015
20	20	"¡Se echan al alacrán encima!"	July 3, 2015
21	21	"¡Todos los caminos llevan al barrio!"	July 6, 2015
22	22	"¡Se les hace bolas el engrudo!"	July 7, 2015
23	23	"¡Su majestad, la mentira!"	July 8, 2015
24	24	"¡Cucurrucucú, Paloma!"	July 9, 2015
25	25	"¡Le ponen el dedo en la llaga!"	July 10, 2015
26	26	"¡Le buscan tres pies al gato!"	July 13, 2015
27	27	"¡Más vale Paloma en mano...!"	July 14, 2015
28	28	"¡Sacan los trapitos al sol!"	July 15, 2015
29	29	"¡En el corazón nadie manda!"	July 16, 2015
30	30	"¡Pagan justos por pecadores!"	July 17, 2015
31	31	"¡En el pecado llevan la penitencia!"	July 20, 2015
32	32	"¡No por mucho madrugar amanece más!"	July 21, 2015
33	33	"¡Ojo por ojo, diente por diente!"	July 22, 2015
34	34	"¡Mejor que digan aquí corrió…!"	July 23, 2015
35	35	"¡La verdad no tiene precio!"	July 24, 2015
36	36	"¡La justicia cojea pero llega!"	July 27, 2015
37	37	"¡El juicio!"	July 28, 2015
38	38	"¡Libre soy, libre soy!"	July 29, 2015
39	39	"¡Ha de ganar mi gallo aunque esté pelón!"	July 30, 2015
40	40	"¡La tumba falsa!"	July 31, 2015

=== August 2015 ===
No. overall	No. in season	Title	Original release date
41	41	"¡El perdido, la mentira y el reencuentro!"	August 3, 2015
42	42	"¡El recuento de los daños!"	August 4, 2015
43	43	"¡Nunca es tarde para el amor!"	August 5, 2015
44	44	"¡Tu desgracia es nuestra desgracia!"	August 6, 2015
45	45	"¡La doña, la dueña y la ofrecida!"	August 7, 2015
46	46	"¡Es hora de revelar la verdad!"	August 10, 2015
47	47	"¡La verdad silenciada!"	August 11, 2015
48	48	"¡Lazos de sangre!"	August 12, 2015
49	49	"¡Vete, aquí corres peligro!"	August 13, 2015
50	50	"¡Lo que se hace por amor!"	August 14, 2015
51	51	"¡La deuda, el reencuentro y la prohibición!"	August 17, 2015
52	52	"¡Tenemos dos opciones!"	August 18, 2015
53	53	"¡El último beso!"	August 19, 2015
54	54	"¡Las mentiras de una madre!"	August 20, 2015
55	55	"¡Dice mi mamá que siempre no!"	August 21, 2015
56	56	"¡Te invito a mi boda!"	August 24, 2015
57	57	"¿Que te explique qué?"	August 25, 2015
58	58	"¡Aunque Monalisa se vista de seda!"	August 26, 2015
59	59	"¡Después de tanto tiempo!"	August 27, 2015
60	60	"¡O me ayudan, o me ayudan!"	August 28, 2015
61	61	"¡Te encontré!"	August 31, 2015

=== September 2015 ===
No. overall	No. in season	Title	Original release date
62	62	"¡Al gato y al ratón!"	September 1, 2015
63	63	"¡Por amor soy capaz de...!"	September 2, 2015
64	64	"¡Se oponga quien se oponga!"	September 3, 2015
65	65	"¿Seguirá la mentira?"	September 4, 2015
66	66	"¡Cambios!"	September 7, 2015
67	67	"¡Hermanos Márquez!"	September 8, 2015
68	68	"¡Corazón traicionado!"	September 9, 2015
69	69	"¡Secreto a voces!"	September 10, 2015
70	70	"¡Pachangón!"	September 11, 2015
71	71	"¡El motivo de la mentira!"	September 14, 2015
72	72	"¡Planes ocultos!"	September 15, 2015
73	73	"¡Noche mexicana!"	September 16, 2015
74	74	"¡Im-pre-sio-nada!"	September 17, 2015
75	75	"¡Por fin la verdad!"	September 18, 2015
76	76	"¡Después de la tormenta!"	September 21, 2015
77	77	"¡Chismes!"	September 22, 2015
78	78	"¡Un precio muy alto!"	September 23, 2015
79	79	"¡Sin palabras! ¡Daniel salva a Gustavo!"	September 24, 2015
80	80	"¡El testamento de Saúl!"	September 25, 2015
81	81	"¡Daniel pelea con Claudio!"	September 28, 2015
82	82	"¡Daniel acusado de homicidio!"	September 29, 2015
83	83	"¡Eugenia está embarazada de Daniel!"	September 30, 2015

=== October 2015 ===
No. overall	No. in season	Title	Original release date
84	84	"¡El juicio de Daniel!"	October 1, 2015
85	85	"¡Adalberto llega a su límite!"	October 2, 2015
86	86	"¡Dalia le dispara a Catalina!"	October 5, 2015
87	87	"¡Monalisa intenta seducir a Raúl!"	October 6, 2015
88	88	"¿Raúl se acuesta con Monalisa?"	October 7, 2015
89	89	"¡Gustavo perdona a Blanca Estela!"	October 8, 2015
90	90	"¡Rodrigo y Eugenia se ven a escondidas!"	October 9, 2015
91	91	"¡Daniel peleará por Paloma!"	October 12, 2015
92	92	"¡Rodrigo llega a casa de Catalina!"	October 13, 2015
93	93	"¡Laura descubre quién es su padre! "	October 14, 2015
94	94	"¡Ariel se enfrenta a Catalina! "	October 15, 2015
95	95	"¡Descubren a Tamara!"	October 16, 2015
96	96	"¡Ponen en su lugar a Catalina!"	October 19, 2015
97	97	"¡Se muere Issac!"	October 20, 2015
98	98	"¿Desalojarán la vecindad?"	October 21, 2015
99	99	"¡Monalisa acorralada!"	October 22, 2015
100	100	"¡Peligra la vida de Laura!"	October 23, 2015
101	101	"¡Rodrigo tiene otra mujer!"	October 26, 2015
102	102	"¡Orden de desalojo a la vecindad!"	October 27, 2015
103	103	"¡Dora Luz confronta a Catalina! "	October 28, 2015
104	104	"¡Mensajes de ultratumba!"	October 29, 2015
105	105	"¡Tamara descubre el odio de Delfina!"	October 30, 2015

=== November 2015 ===
No. overall	No. in season	Title	Original release date
106	106	"¡Catalina debe morir!"	November 2, 2015
107	107	"¡La sentencia de Blanca Estela!"	November 3, 2015
108	108	"¡Tamara confiesa sus crímenes!"	November 4, 2015
109	109	"¡Paloma y Laura sorprendidas en Guatemala!"	November 5, 2015
110	110	"¡El último y nos vamos!"	November 6, 2015
111	111	"¡Gran Final de Amor de Barrio!"	November 8, 2015
