= Mi querida Isabel =

Mexican telenovela

- Genre: Telenovela; Romance; Drama
- Created by: Marissa Garrido
- Written by: René Muñoz; Ricardo Fiallega
- Directed by: Antulio Jiménez Pons
- Starring: Karla Álvarez; Ernesto Laguardia; Jacqueline Andere; José Elías Moreno; Nuria Bages
- Theme music composer: José Ramón Flórez
- Opening theme: Mi querida Isabel by Kairo
- Country of origin: Mexico
- Original language: Spanish
- No. of episodes: 98

Production
- Executive producer: Angelli Nesma Medina
- Producer: María de Jesús Arellano
- Production locations: Filming; Televisa San Ángel; Mexico City, Mexico
- Cinematography: Antulio Jiménez Pons
- Running time: 41-44 minutes
- Production company: Televisa

Original release
- Network: Canal de las Estrellas
- Release: December 9, 1996 – April 25, 1997

Related
- Paloma (1975); Muchacha de Barrio (1979-1980); Felicita dove sei? (1985); Amor de barrio (2015)

Mi querida Isabel (English: My dear Isabel) is a Mexican telenovela produced by Angelli Nesma Medina for Televisa. This telenovela is a remake of the 1975 Mexican telenovela Paloma, original story by Marissa Garrido. It premiered on Canal de las Estrellas on December 9, 1996 and ended on April 25, 1997.

Karla Álvarez, Ernesto Laguardia, Jacqueline Andere, José Elías Moreno and Nuria Bages starred in this telenovela.

== Plot ==
Isabel is a law student who has been effectively running her home ever since her mom died. Her dad, Manuel, is an alcoholic lawyer who can't hold down a job, and her brother, Marcos, is a rebel who is only interested in music and becoming famous. Isabel is interested in the case of Sagrario, a woman who has been imprisoned for 19 years for a crime she did not commit. Isabel is unaware that Sagrario is her and Marcos' mother.

Juan Daniel is a young architect who comes from a well-off family. His mother, Clara, has lived for her children ever since her husband was murdered, but her affection is suffocating for them. Juan Daniel's girlfriend cheated on him a while back, and he has been lonely and heartbroken ever since.

Juan Daniel meets Isabel and falls in love with her. Both are unaware that Sagrario was accused of killing his father, but the vengeful Clara will find out and do everything possible to separate them.

Things will get even more complicated for Isabel and Juan Daniel when Sagrario serves her sentence and is released and Manuel brings Sagrario to live with the family.

== Cast ==
- Karla Álvarez as Isabel Rivas
- Ernesto Laguardia as Juan Daniel Márquez Riquelme
- Jacqueline Andere as Doña Clara Riquelme Viuda de Márquez
- José Elías Moreno as Manuel Rivas
- Nuria Bages as Sagrario
- Roberto Ballesteros as Federico
- Roberto Blandón as Oscar
- Carlos Bracho as Bernardo
- Silvia Caos as Miguelina
- Dacia González as Lupe
- Dacia Arcaráz as Julia
- Eduardo Liñán as Hugo del Real
- Marina Marín as Irma
- Patricia Martínez as Amanda
- Juan Felipe Preciado as Rivero
- Eduardo Noriega as Erasto
- Jorge Salinas as Alejandro
- Yadira Santana as Aleida
- Víctor Hugo Vieyra as Octavio Romero
- Abraham Stavans as Medina
- Ariadna Welter as Tita
- Renata Flores as Endolina
- Arlette Pacheco as Margarita
- Vanessa Angers as Rosa
- Silvia Campos as Mary
- Mario Carballido as Rafael
- Luis Gatica as Ricardo
- Rafael Inclán as Pantaleón
- Ernesto Godoy as Felipe
- Mauricio Islas as Marcos Rivas
- Mercedes Molto as Eugenia
- Renée Varsi as Adela Márquez Riquelme
- Abraham Ramos as Rolando
- Indra Zuno as Leticia
- Lino Martone as Aldo
- Archie Lanfranco as Dr. Carlos
- Carlos Peniche as Mecala
- Eduardo Iduñate as Callejero
- Julio Mannino as Jorge
- Gustavo Rojo as Joaquín
- Gabriel Soto as Juan
- Maricruz Nájera as Jesusita
- Alfonso Iturralde as Ernesto
- Ismael Larrumbe as Pedro
- Marco Antonio Calvillo as Cácaro
- Octavio Menduet as Detective
- Polly as Clara (young)
- Guillermo Aguilar
- Raúl Padilla "Chóforo"
- Rodolfo Lago
- Aída Naredo
- Virginia Gimeno
- Lupe Vázquez
- Enrique Hidalgo
- Ricardo Vera
- Ana María de la Torre
- Zamorita
- Martín Barraza
- Chuty Rodríguez
- Raúl Castellanos
- Jonathan Herrera
- Milagros Rueda
- Carmen Rodríguez
- Tere Pave
- Fabrizio Mercini
- Paty Solorio
- Mané Macedo
- Daniela Garmendia
- Manuel Cepeda
- Enrique Borja Baena
