= 15 auténticos éxitos =

Greatest hits album by Irma Serrano
- Released: 1984 (LP release); 4 November 1997 (CD reissue)
- Recorded: 1963–1967
- Genre: Ranchera; corrido
- Length: 42:14
- Label: CBS/Columbia International

Professional ratings
Review scores
Source	Rating
AllMusic	3/5 stars

15 auténticos éxitos (15 Authentic Hits) is a greatest hits album by Mexican singer Irma Serrano, released in 1984 by CBS Records International. It features Serrano's fifteen hit songs released from 1963 to 1967.

== Track listing ==
No.	Title	Writer(s)	Length
1.	"Canción de un preso"	M. S. Acuña; Felipe Valdés Leal	3:17
2.	"Concha querida"	Rafael Carrión; Irma Serrano	3:03
3.	"Copitas de mezcal"	Jesús Palacios	3:00
4.	"Con fecha de mañana"	Víctor Cordero	3:00
5.	"Prisionero de tus brazos"	Felipe Valdés Leal; R. O. Contreras	2:24
6.	"Mi destino fue quererte"	Felipe Valdés Leal	2:46
7.	"Escaleras de la cárcel"	Cuco Sánchez	3:10
8.	"La Martina"	Irma Serrano	2:58
9.	"Yo trataba un casado"	Basilio Villarreal	2:23
10.	"Zenaida ingrata"	Raymundo Pérez y Soto	2:15
11.	"El puente roto"	Víctor Cordero	2:34
12.	"Flor del río"	Víctor Cordero	2:39
13.	"La Delgadina"	Las Isabeles	3:14
14.	"Limosna de un hijo"	Basilio Villarreal	2:00
15.	"Lloren organillos"	Irma Serrano	2:42
