= Nana (1985 film) =

- Directed by: Rafael Baledón
- Written by: Émile Zola; Irma Serrano
- Produced by: Jose Bolaños
- Starring: Irma Serrano; Isela Vega; Verónica Castro; Gregorio Casal
- Cinematography: León Sánchez
- Edited by: Carlos Savage
- Music by: Rafael Elizondo
- Release date: May 9, 1985
- Country: Mexico
- Language: Spanish

Naná is a 1985 Mexican musical, erotic and sexploitation film directed by Rafael Baledón. The film follows a beautiful young woman of humble origins who seeks, through the high prostitution, access to a well-off. Naná symbolizes the degradation of the Second Empire.

The film is an adaptation of the 1970s Mexican stageplay of the same name, produced by the actress and singer Irma Serrano. The stageplay was itself based on the 1880 novel Nana, by Emile Zola.

== Plot ==
In 19th-century Paris, a prostitute causes uproar; although her name is Teresa, everyone knows her as Naná (Irma Serrano). Naná and her best friend Satan (Veronica Castro) work as prostitutes, first on the streets of Paris, and after in a small room. In her youth, Naná was sexually abused by her stepfather and thrown from her home by her mother. As the result of this violation, she gave birth to a son. Naná works as a prostitute to make money to raise her son, who lives away from her, under the care of her aunt. Nana occasionally works in a theater, which is really an underground brothel. One night, Naná is presented in the theater as "The Venus of Fire," and causes a sensation by appearing nude. Powerful men offer jewelry and luxuries for her favors, and Naná accepts the attentions of a banker, who presents her with a house in the French countryside. In this house, Naná holds an affair with a young aristocrat whom she calls Coquito (Jaime Garza). This same night, she is pressed by the banker to fulfill her sexual favors, while the owner of the theater-brothel where she worked, forced herto return to fulfill a contract. Naná repudiates both men and seeks solace in the Count Muffat (Manuel Ojeda), a distinguished and respectable aristocrat dedicated to the charity. However, Muffat confesses that he has also succumbed to her charms and desires her. Disappointed, Naná decides to leave her life as a courtesan and return to work on the streets.

One night Naná is chased by the police, but is rescued by Satin (Isela Vega), a courtesan and friend. After spending the night together, Satin convinces her to return to life as a courtesan. Naná accepts becoming Count Muffat’s mistress and returns to the theater to present her nude shows. With support from Muffat, Nana tries to become a serious actress, snatching the characters to the actress and courtesan Rosa Mignon, but is ridiculed, because they say that she only serves to show her naked body. Naná falls into depression, and her home becomes the center of Parisian vice, where people go to get drunk and have orgies and sexual debauchery.

Muffat, who has been ruined by Naná's debauchery, confronts her in the middle of a party hosted by her for the triumphs of a mare (called Naná in her honor) in a horse show. In response, Naná reveals to Muffat that his wife has committed adultery in this same house. The Count decides to leave her. That night, her young lover Coquito commits suicide after he learns that Naná had sexual relations with his brother, a soldier. After the events of the night, Naná decides to retire from life as a courtesan. Her friend Satan dies from tuberculosis.

Naná reunites with her child, who dies soon later by smallpox. Naná returns to Paris two years later, infected by smallpox and in abject poverty. Nana died in the streets of Paris. Her body is confused between the bodies of the tramps, while a carnival through the streets of Paris. In this moment, the Prussian army invades the city.

== Cast ==
- Irma Serrano as Nana
- Manuel Ojeda as Muffat
- Isela Vega as Satin
- Verónica Castro as Satán
- Jaime Garza as Coquito
- Roberto Cobo as Francisco

== Production notes ==
The films is an adaptation of a polemic stageplay of the 1970s produced and starred by the Mexican actress and singer Irma Serrano La Tigresa on her own stage, the Teatro Fru Fru, in México City. The stageplay caused controversy in Mexico by his representation of nude, erotism and lesbic performances. The film reproduces the original stageplay and was censured by many movie theaters because his high erotic content.
