= Kitty de Hoyos =

Mexican actress (1941–1999)

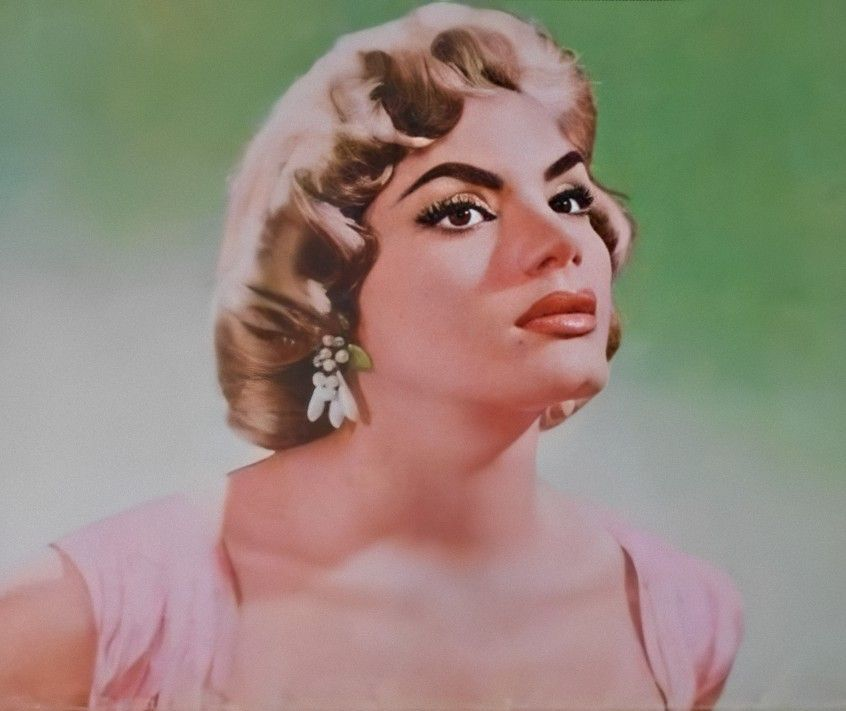
- De Hoyos in 1959
- Born: María Cristina Guadalupe Vega Hoyos; February 8, 1941; Mexico City
- Died: December 28, 1999 (aged 58); Mexico City
- Occupation: Actress
- Years active: 1954–1998
- Awards: Diosa de Plata (1966)

María Cristina Guadalupe Vega Hoyos (8 February 1941 – 28 December 1999), known as Kitty de Hoyos (Spanish pronunciation: [/oʝos/]), was a Mexican actress.

As a film actress, she appeared in more than 50 films. She was active in films and theater in the 1950s, 1960s and 1970s, and in television in the 1980s. In Mexico, she's considered one of the most famous actresses, sex symbols and popular icons of those decades. She was known for her beauty, charm, and versatile acting style, both in comedy and dramatic roles.

== Early life ==
Hoyos was born on February 8, 1941, in Mexico City. Her year of birth is unclear, since sources have reported it as 1936, 1937, and 1941. However in a 1981 interview she revealed that she was 13 years old when she auditioned for the 1954 film La duda. (Note: the 1954 film La duda starred Rosita Quintana, was directed by Alejandro Galindo, and produced by Sergio Kogan.)

Her parents were Héctor Vega and María Borinquen Hoyos, an opera singer.

Her mother urged her to pursue a career in acting since a teenager. At the age of 13, she began studying at the Andrés Soler acting academy. Her mother had her dye her hair, wear makeup, and dress older so that Hoyos could audition for more mature roles.

Her first role at the age of 13 was in a sketch in the TV show Telecomedia de Manolo Fabregas in 1954.

== Career ==
=== Film ===
In 1955 Hoyos had uncredited roles in the films ¡Que bravas son las costeñas! and La culpa de los hombres, and a minor role in Yo no creo en los hombres.

Also in 1955, she had a minor yet breakthrough role in Esposas infieles (Unfaithful wives), where she appeared nude from the waist up, with the appearance of a statue, while Agustín Lara played the piano.

Esposas Infieles was part of a series of films from the early 1950s that used "artistic nudity" as an element of its allure. The films were commercially successful. However, in the 1950s conservative Mexican society, it didn’t take long for pressure from conservative groups to lead to censorship, ultimately putting an end to the perceived audacity of depicting female bodies (often static) with exposed breasts or implied nudity beneath transparent clothing. (Note: Between 1955 and 1956, the brothers Pedro and Guillermo Calderón financed several films featuring light nudity, including La Fuerza del Deseo, El Seductor, and La Ilegítima, a trilogy directed by Chano Urueta; La Virtud Desnuda, Esposas Infieles, and Juventud Desenfrenada, all directed by José Díaz Morales; and a Diana Cazadora, directed by Tito Davison.)

After the fame obtained by the nude appearance, Hoyos ascended to the status of a public icon. However, she was typecasted in seductive, femme fatale or irrelevant roles that required her to show her legs or wear scanty clothing. All of this took a significant toll on her emotional well-being, and even while she didn't made another nude role, it took years for her to recover from it.

In 1960 Hoyos filmed La Sombra del Caudillo (The Shadow of the Leader), directed by Julio Bracho, based on Martín Luis Guzmán's novel of the same name. Set in the aftermath of the Mexican Revolution, it follows the political power struggles within the country as various factions fight for control. The story centers on a charismatic and authoritarian leader, or 'caudillo', whose rise to power results in betrayal, manipulation, and ethical dilemmas among his supporters and enemies. The film explores themes of loyalty, corruption, and the moral consequences of power in post-revolutionary Mexico. The film had top actors, like Tito Junco, Tomás Perrín, Carlos López Moctezuma and Ignacio López Tarso, but even though it was produced along with the Mexican Government, it was censored at the request of the army, since the film portrayed it in a negative light. It was finally released in 1990.

In 1965 Hoyos filmed La loba (The She-Wolf ), directed by René Cardona. It's a horror film set in the 19th century. It tells the story of a woman who is cursed to transform into a wolf due to a dark family secret. As she struggles with her monstrous alter ego, the film explores themes of love, betrayal, and the supernatural. The movie combines elements of gothic horror and Mexican folklore. It's regarded as a horror classic. Another horror films of her are Aventuras en el centro de la Tierra (Adventures in the Center of the Earth) from 1966, Muertos de miedo (Dead from fear) from 1958 and Los Jinetes de la Bruja from 1966.

That same year, Hoyos was cast in Los cuervos están de luto (The Ravens are in mourning), along with Silvia Pinal and Lilia Prado. It was directed by Jaime Salvador. The story revolves around a family caught in the aftermath of a tragic event, and Hoyos portrayed the ghost of the dead wife of the man. It's regarded as one of her finest roles, which earned her a Diosa de Plata (Silver Goddess) award.

Between 1963 and 1964, Hoyos starred in four Zorro-inspired movies: In 1963 Aventuras de las hermanas X (Adventures of the Sisters X) and Las vengadoras enmascaradas (The masked woman avengers); the next year she starred in Las hijas del Zorro (The daughters of Zorro) and Las invencibles (The invincible women). In Aventuras de las hermanas X, Hoyos portrayed Christine, a traveling entertainer who secretly becomes a whip-wielding avenger, determined to track down the killer of her parents from twelve years earlier. She is assisted by her sister Teresa, played by Dacia González. The following year, the two sisters (de Hoyos and González) continued their adventures in Las Vengadoras Enmascaradas, which centers on a silver shipment robbery that results in the death of Teresa's fiancé. All of them were directed by Federico Curiel and starred by Hoyos and González. The movies were inspired by the 1944 film serial Zorro's Black Whip, with a female Zorro as the main role.

Other film credits of Hoyos include Heroína (1965), filmed in New York, and La fiebre del deseo (1966).

In her dramatic roles, she worked along with renowned actos like Arturo de Córdova, Pedro Armendáriz, Silvia Pinal, Marga López, Columba Domínguez, David Reynoso and Javier Solís. Along with her dramatic roles, Hoyos is remembered for the comedy movies she made with comedians Tin-Tan, Resortes, Cantinflas, Viruta and Capulina, Clavillazo and Piporro.

=== Theatre ===
In 1956, Hoyos began performing as a vedette in revue theater at the Iris, Lírico, Folies Bergère, and Nuevo Ideal theaters. A song was composed about her, called Las piernas de Kitty (Kitty's legs).

In 1957 she appeared in the theater production of Bonjour Tristesse, which was well received by critics.

The renowned playwright Salvador Novo saw Hoyos at the play 504, directed by José María Fernández Unsáin, and urged her to do serious theater. This also worked in her favor, allowing her to showcase her acting skills and break free from being typecast as a seductress

In Sangre verde (Green blood) by Silvio Giovaninetti, directed by Salvador Novo, she was recognized as a great actress. Her performance earned her the 'Revelation of the Year' award by the Theater Critics Association (Agrupación de Críticos de Teatro).

In 1960 she performed in Léocadia by Jean Anouilh, with good reviews. She was also directed by Salvador Novo.

She performed in over 40 theater productions. Her theater career extended into the 1980s, where she performed in Señoritas a disgusto by Antonio González Caballero.

Her last play was ¿Quien, Yo? (Who, Me?) by Dalmiro Sáenz in 1998, to mostly favorable reviews.

=== Television ===
In the 1970s and 1980s, she acted in popular telenovelas.

She also took part in radio dramas and voice dubbing, and co-hosted programs with Paco Malgesto.

== Personal life and death ==
Hoyos was married to Juan Gabriel Torres Landa (1943–2012), son of Juan José Torres Landa, former Governor of Guanajuato. The couple had two daughters, María Cristina and Gabriela María. Hoyos' death certificate states that they were divorced at the time of her death.

She died of cancer in Mexico City on December 28, 1999.

== Recognition ==
In 1960, the Theater Critics Association (Agrupación de Críticos de Teatro) gave her the 'Revelation of the Year' award for the previous year.

In 1966 she was awarded the Diosa de Plata (Silver Goddess) in the Best Supporting Actress category for her work on the film Los Cuervos están de luto.

In 1979, a wax sculpture of Hoyos was exhibited in the Wax Museum of Mexico City. It remained on display until 1992, when a fire destroyed many figures.

In 1999, a ceremony was held at the Cineteca Nacional to commemorate Hoyos' 45 years of artistic career. The writer Carlos Monsiváis said she belonged to the last stage of the Golden Age of Mexican Cinema.

== Selected acting credits ==
=== Film ===
- Asesinos, S.A. (1957)
- Muertos de miedo (1958)
- Ama a tu prójimo (1958)
- Trip to the Moon (1958)
- La sombra del caudillo (1960)
- Pilotos de la muerte(1962)
- Los signos del zodiaco (1963)
- Sinful (1965)
- Los cuervos están de luto (1965)
- The She-Wolf (1965)
- Domingo salvaje (1967)

=== Television ===
- La ambiciosa (1960)
- Los que ayudan a Dios (1973)
- Acompáñame (1977)
- Muchacha de barrio (1979)
- Tiempo de amar (1987)
