= Gabriel Torres (disambiguation) =

Gabriel Torres may refer to:

- Gabriel Torres (born 1988), Panamanian football forward
- Gabriel Torres (athlete) from Puerto Rican records in track and field
- Gabriel Torres (cinematographer) for The Woman Hunter
- Gabriel Torres Garcés, producer of Los signos del zodiaco
- Gabriel Torres Villaseñor from National Prize for Arts and Sciences (Mexico)
