= Infamia (TV series) =

- Genre: Telenovela; Drama
- Written by: Alfonso Cremata; Salvador Ugarte
- Directed by: Manolo García; Lorenzo de Rodas
- Starring: Susana Dosamantes; Julio Alemán; Hilda Aguirre; Norma Lazareno; Nelly Meden; Sergio Bustamante
- Country of origin: Mexico
- Original language: Spanish

Production
- Executive producer: Fernando Chacón
- Production locations: Mexico City, Mexico
- Production company: Televisa

Original release
- Network: Canal de las Estrellas
- Release: March 8, 1981 – September 4, 1982

Related
- Espejismo; Lo que el cielo no perdona

Infamia (English title: Disgrace) is a Mexican telenovela produced by Fernando Chacón for Televisa in 1981.

Susana Dosamantes and Julio Alemán starred as protagonists, while Hilda Aguirre starred as antagonist.

== Plot ==
Lydia Santana is a woman married to David Montalvo, an older rich man. They have a son, Tony. Lydia is unhappy because David is cold and sullen, and she only married him out of spite, as the great love of her life Victor Andreu abandoned her in her youth. One day, while Lydia is buying a wedding anniversary gift for her husband, she bumps into Victor. Both are surprised to find each other after so many years, but they part and go home. Victor has never stopped loving Lydia or thinking about her despite being married to Alma, a sweet and loving wife, who has a daughter, Lolita.

Days later, David, who didn’t come home the night of the anniversary, decides to throw a lavish party to celebrate. Lydia and Victor meet again at the party, talk and discover that they have never ceased to love one another. However, standing between the two is Sandra Morgado, a frivolous and unscrupulous woman friend. She claims Alma has always been in love with Victor, and Lydia is being used to destroy Victor’s marriage. Lydia happens to pull off the road and stays with Victor.

== Cast ==
- Julio Alemán as Victor Andreu
- Susana Dosamantes as Lidia Santana
- Norma Lazareno as Alma
- Sergio Bustamante as David Montalvo
- Nelly Meden as Matilde
- Juan Peláez as Alejandro
- Enrique Becker as César
- Claudia Guzmán as Dorita
- Angelita Castany as Bárbara
- Carmen Salas as Betty
- Enrique Rubio Dosamantes as Tony
- Alfonso Munguia as Rolando Fuentes
- Karmin Marcelo as Mónica Palacios
- Bárbara Gil as Emilia
- Hilda Aguirre as Sandra Morgado
- Yolanda Ciani as Elvira Jimenez
- Carlos Cámara as Inspector Carmona
- Luis Torner as Andrés
- Rafael Banquells as Dr.Navarro
- Fernando Roblesas
- Miguel Córcega
- Teo Tapia
- Felix Santaella
- Enrique Barrera como Hugo
- Antonio Ruiz
- Veronica Langer
- Paulina Lazareno as Paulita
