= Ofelia Medina =

Mexican actress, singer and screenwriter

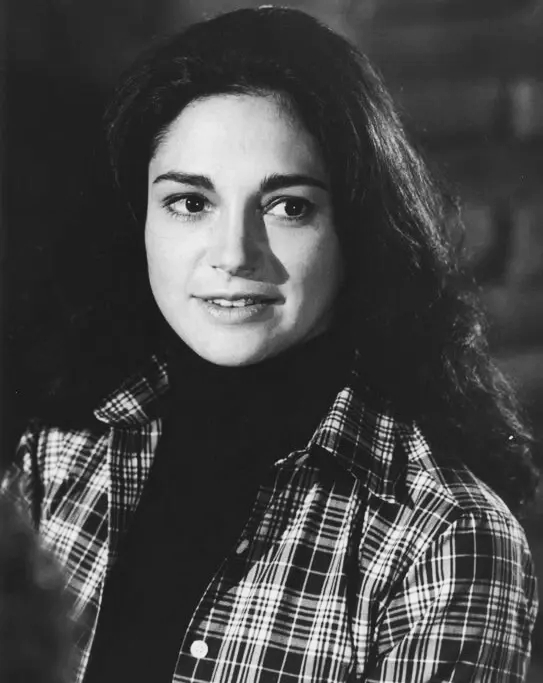
- Medina in The Big Fix (1978)
- Born: María Ofelia Medina Torres; March 4, 1950 (age 76); Mérida, Yucatán, Mexico
- Years active: 1968–present
- Spouses: Alex Philips, Jr. (m. 1973; div. 1978) Pedro Armendáriz, Jr. (m. 1981; died 2011)
- Children: 2
- Awards: Ariel Award (2005)
- Website: https://www.ofeliamedina.com/

María Ofelia Medina Torres (born March 4, 1950) is a Mexican actress, singer and film screenwriter.

== Early life ==
She was born in Mérida and has four siblings: Arturo, Leo, Ernesto and Beatriz. At the age of eight she moved with her family to Mexico City where she studied elementary, middle and high school as well as dance at the Academia de Danza Mexicana where she graduated as a performer and teacher of contemporary and regional classical dance. Her father, she has explained in several interviews, opposed her dedication to the artistic medium and she succeeded with the support of her mother.

In 1961, at the age of eleven, she belonged to the children's pantomime group created by Alejandro Jodorowski, whom she considers her first teacher.

In 1968, she was a student at the National Preparatory School of UNAM. In 1977, she studied acting with Lee Strasberg in Los Angeles and later emigrated to Europe with the aim of continuing her training at the Odin Theater in Denmark.

== Career ==
Medina's debut in the artistic medium as a professional was with H3O, where she worked with Alejandro Jodorowsky. Later she participated with Julio Castillo, where she was seen by Ofelia Guilmáin. Guilmáin took her with Emilio Azcárraga Vidaurreta, who sent her with Luis de Llano, who gave her the opportunity to work in Lucía Sombras, where she had the leading role. She made her film debut in 1968 with the film La paz

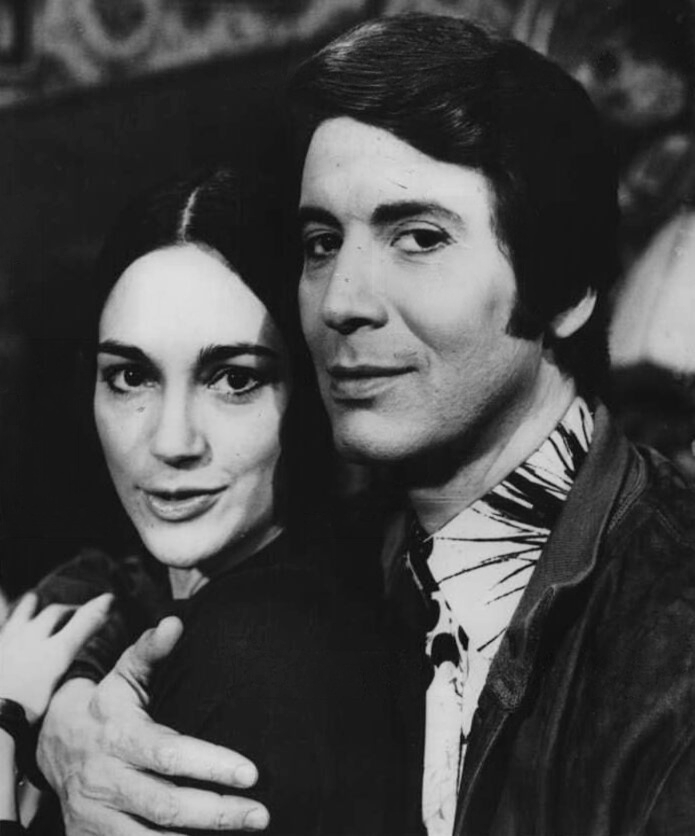
Ofelia Medina and Enrique Álvarez Félix in Rina (1977)

In 1971, she was called by producer Ernesto Alonso to make her first television appearance in the series Landrú, which was followed by the melodrama Lucía Sombra (1971), where she had the main role and became a "romantic heroine". Later she participated in La hiena (1973) and Paloma (1975). In 1977, she played a hunchback in the telenovela Rina, which gained her critical acclaim. A year later, she worked in Hollywood with The Big Fix (1978).

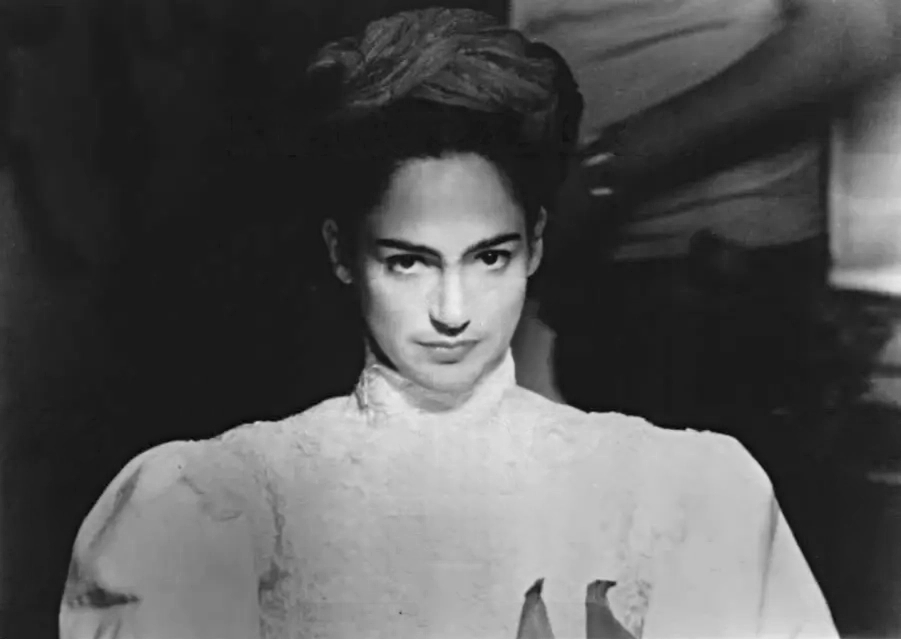
Ofelia Medina as Frida Kahlo in Frida, naturaleza viva (1983)

In 1983, she portrayed Frida Kahlo in Paul Leduc's Frida, naturaleza viva, an award-winning film about Kahlo's life. In Canada, Medina was nominated for the Genie Award for her work in Diplomatic Immunity in 1991.

On television, in addition to Lucía Sombra, she worked in La Señora Joven, Paloma, Rina with Enrique Álvarez Félix, La gloria y el infierno and Toda una vida Desam, directed by Héctor Mendoza, based on the life of María Conesa and other actresses from the late 19th and early 20th centuries. She participated in the telenovela For a lifetime, a part recorded in Peru and part in Mexico and it was a new version of the famous Vivir un Poco. She made a special participation in A Corazón Abierto.

She directed and starred in the play The night that never existed, by Humberto Robles, winner of the 2014 Emilio Carballido National Dramaturgy Prize. She participated in the shows Mujeres sin Fear: We are all Atenco on the repression of San Salvador Atenco in May 2006 and belongs to the group of the same name along with Begoña Lecumberri, Julieta Egurrola, Carmen Huete, Francesca Guillén and Humberto Robles, among other actors and guest musicians.

In 2006, she took part in the movie I love Miami (2006), by Alejandro González Padilla, and participated in the dubbing of the animated film The legend of Nahuala (2007).

In 2008, she reappeared on the small screen in the chapter "Mónica, cornered", from the series Mujeres Asesinas, in which she played Beatriz, mother of the character played by actress Iran Castillo.

The following year, she premiered in Rome, Italy, in Mexican Voices, in which she gave life to female characters from the history of Mexico, such as Kahlo, Sor Juana Inés de la Cruz, and Rosario Castellanos.

In 2008, she was part of the series Mujeres Asesinas in the Monica chapter, cornered with Iran Castillo.

In 2013, she was part of the telenovelas, Los Rey and Secretos de familia, on TV Azteca. In 2015, she worked on the soap opera Tanto amor playing Silvia Iturbide Vda. by Lombardo

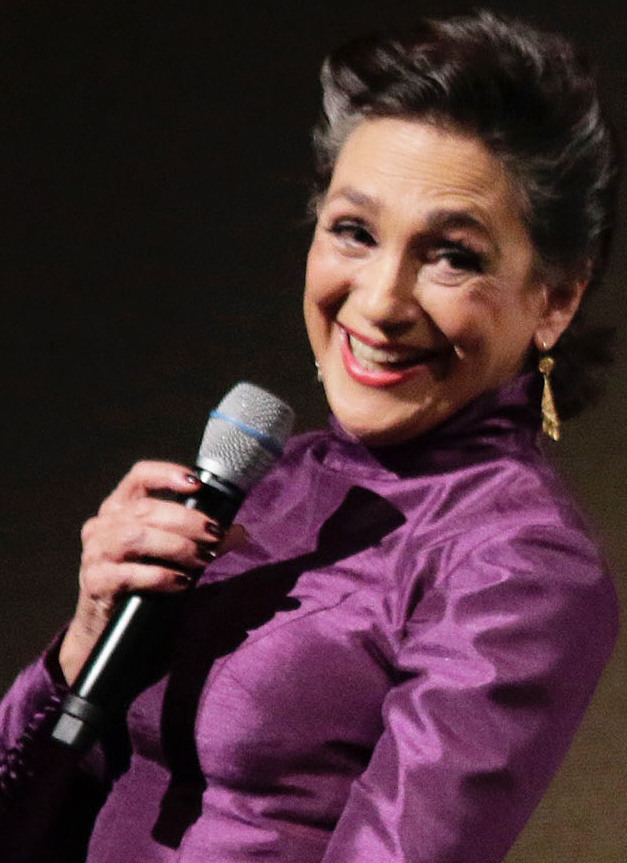
Medina in 2019

In July 2016, she announced that at the end of the year she would begin shooting her first film as a director, a story about a boy from the Mayan community inspired by the reality that she herself has scripted.

In 2021, Medina received the Golden Ariel in recognition of her career and activism for indigenous groups. The award was given to her by Guadalupe Vázquez, a Tzotzil activist and survivor of the 1997 Acteal massacre.

== Theater ==
Medina has played in various theatres worldwide. Since 2000, Medina played Kahlo in Cada quien su Frida. In 2007, Medina toured in Denmark, playing in Århus, Copenhagen, and Odense.

== Activism ==
Currently, she is politically active as a supporter of the indigenous people of southern Mexico. In her biography she tells that thanks to Frida Kalho - in 1983 she premiered with Paul Leduc Frida Naturaleza Viva - she learned "about the love of the Indians of Mexico, about communism and surrealism."

In 1985 she was co-founder of the "Committee of Solidarity with marginalized ethnic groups", the first Mexican organization for the defense of the Human Rights of the Indians of Mexico, which began with a seminar on hunger in Mexico and later on the defense of indigenous prisoners in Mexican prisons and cultural activities with Indian communities. From this moment, Ofelia Medina denounced, began to receive threats for her activity as a defender of Human Rights in Mexico.

In 1990 she was co-founder of the Trust for the Health of Indigenous Children of Mexico, A.C. This same year, FISANIM began working in Chiapas on a nutrition program in Zapatista communities.

She was an organizer of the elections in the Zapatista territory, denounced the fraud of said elections and was an electoral attorney.

She belonged to the civil society group in the Peace Dialogue in Chiapas and the formulation of the San Andrés Accords.

In 1998 she was part of the group that made the amendments to article 4 of the Constitution to conceive of Mexico as a multiethnic, multicultural country.

"The government of the state of Chiapas declared me Persona Non Grata in the state and tried to expel me from the state. I was defended by many people and I remained there working until today. ..."

In 2006 she participated in the documentary Juárez: the city where women are disposable.

She is currently a member of the Academy of Human Rights, the Foundation of the Committee for Solidarity with Marginalized Ethnic Groups, the United Nations Peace Council and the Group of 100.

Ofelia Medina has acted in various plays, such as The Vagina Monologues, Each one his Frida and Intimately, Rosario de Chiapas; these last two works were written, directed and acted by herself.

== Discography ==
- Toda una vida (1982)
- Sor Juana hoy (1996)

== Filmography ==
=== Film ===
- La Paz (1968)
- Patsy, mi amor (1969) as Patsy
- Las impuras (1969)
- Las Pirañas aman en Cuaresma (1969) as Mirta / Daughter
- Las figuras de arena (1970)
- Las rebelión de las hijas (1970)
- Paraíso (1970) as Magaly
- Las puertas del paraíso (1971) as Lucia
- El águila descalza (1971) as Chona
- El cambio (1971)
- Muñeca reina (1972) as Amilamia
- Apolinar (1972)
- De qué color es el viento (1973) as Adelita
- Uno y medio contra el mundo (1973)
- El hombre de los hongos (1976) as Lucila
- La palomilla al rescate (1977) as Elisa
- The Big Fix (1978) as Alora
- Vacaciones misteriosas (1976) as Elisa
- Pueblo de Boquilla (1981)
- Complot Petróleo: La cabeza de la hidra (1981)
- Frida, naturaleza viva (1983) as Frida Kahlo
- Camino largo a Tijuana (1988) as Rita
- Orgia de terror (1990)
- Gertrudis Bocanegra (1992) as Gertrudis Bocanegra
- Nocturno a Rosario (1992) as Rosario de la Peña
- Diplomatic Immunity (1992) as Sara Roldán
- Íntimo terror (1992)
- Un Muro de Silencio (1993) as Silvia
- Couleur Havane (1999) as Mayra
- Before Night Falls (2000) as Landlady
- Cuando te hablen de amor (2002) as Graciela Garbo
- Ezequiel el volador (2004, Short) as Mama
- Valentina (2004, Short)
- Voces inocentes (2004) as Mama Toya
- Club eutanasia (2005) as the director
- Agua con sal (2005) as Olvido
- Un bel morir (2005, Short)
- Mujer alabastrina (2006)
- I Love Miami (2006) as Doña Emilia
- Caleuche: El llamado del mar (2006) as Madre Isabel
- La leyenda de la Nahuala (2007) as Nahuala (voice) / Sra. Machorro (voice)
- Las buenas hierbas (2010) as Lala
- Colombiana (2011) as Mama
- Memoria de mis putas tristes (2011) as Mujer de gris / Woman in gray
- Los Ojos Azules (2012) as Yaxte
- Panorama (2013) as Ofelia
- Macho (2016) as Mamá Evaristo
- Nadie sabrá nunca (2018) as Fidela
- Plan V (2018)
- 1938: When Mexico Recovered Its Oil (2025) as Amalia Solórzano

=== Television ===
- Las máscaras (1971)
- Lucía Sombra (1971) as Lucía Sombra
- La señora joven (1972) as Susana Ricarte
- La hiena (1973) as Isabel Solís
- Paloma (1975) as Paloma
- Rina (1977) as Rina
- Toda una vida (1981) as Alejandra Pastora
- La gloria y el infierno (1986) as Inés Arteaga
- Para toda la vida (1996) as Elena
- Mujeres Asesinas: Mónica acorralada (2008) as Beatriz Fernández.
- A Corazón Abierto (2012) as Irene de Sánchez
- Los Rey (2012)

== Awards and nominations ==
=== Ariel Award (2005) ===
- Best supporting actress for Voces inocentes.

=== 12th Genie Awards ===
- Best supporting actress for Diplomatic Immunity.
