= Marcha nupcial =

- Genre: Telenovela; Romance; Drama
- Created by: Original Story; Inés Rodena; Adaptation; Luis Reyes de la Maza
- Directed by: Noé Alcántara
- Starring: Alma Muriel; Carlos Piñar; Blanca Sánchez; Augusto Benedico; Rosario Granados; Elsa Cárdenas
- Country of origin: Mexico
- Original language: Spanish
- No. of episodes: 195

Production
- Executive producer: Valentín Pimstein
- Running time: 30 minutes

Original release
- Network: Canal de las Estrellas
- Release: 1977 – 1978

Related
- Bodas de odio (1983); Marisol (1996); Amor real (2003); Lo que la vida me robó (2013)

Marcha nupcial (English title: Bridal march) is a Mexican telenovela produced by Valentín Pimstein for Televisa in 1977.

Alma Muriel and Carlos Piñar starred as protagonists, while Blanca Sánchez starred as main antagonist.

== Cast ==
- Alma Muriel: Maria Dolores Montes Laresgoitia De Martinez "Maria Lola"
- Carlos Piñar: Sergio Laresgoitia
- Blanca Sánchez: Imelda
- Augusto Benedico Don Esteban Laresgoitia
- Rosario Granados: Margarita Larezgoitia de Montes
- Elsa Cárdenas: Dora
- Enrique Rocha: Fernando Martinez
- Ofelia Guilmáin: Maria Luisa Laresgoitía
- Roxana Saucedo: Patricia "Paty"
- Gustavo Rojo: Esteban Laresgoitía (Hijo)
- Aldo Monti: Julio
- Lucía Guilmáin: Lucila Ariaga
- Héctor Cruz: Ruben el factor
- Aldo Monti: Julio
- Miguel Gomez Checa: Don Antonio Ariaga
- Maria Belzares: Lucia la madrina de Imelda
- Miguel Corcega: Dr. Mario Lopez
- Aurora Molina: Dona Petra
- José Elias Moreno: Lacho
- Renata Flores: Georgina la enfermera
- Tony Carbajal: Padre Simon
- Aurora Cortes: Josepha la madre de Fernando
- Arturo Lorca: Calisto
- Fernando Mendoza: Jacinto
- Estela Chacón: Lupe la camarera de Maria Luísa
- Graciela Bernardos: Sor Carudad
- Carmen Cortes: Sor Sofia
