= Carlos Cámara =

Mexican actor (1934–2016)

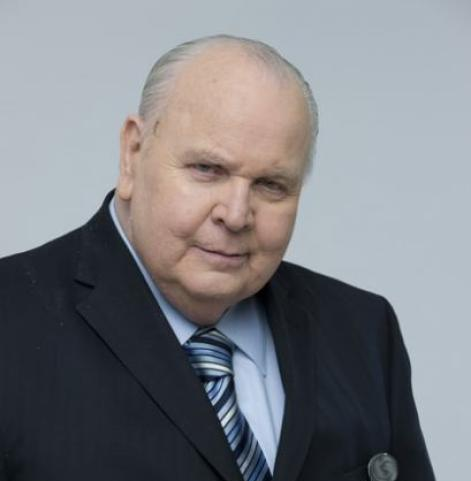
- Born: Carlos Cámara Lázaro; 9 January 1934; Santo Domingo, Dominican Republic
- Died: 24 February 2016 (aged 82); Mexico City, Mexico
- Occupation: Actor
- Years active: 1960-2013

Cárlos Cámara Lázaro (9 January 1934 – 24 February 2016) was a Dominican actor.

== Biography ==
Cámara was born to a family of artists. He migrated to Venezuela where he married the actress Lolita Cámara. with whom he had three children: the actors Carlos Cámara Jr., Víctor Cámara and Elisa Parejo. The marriage ended in divorce. He later remarried in Mexico and had another daughter, Norma Cámara.

He moved to Mexico in the late 1960s, where he worked in television, cinema and theatre, at that time Carlos got the Mexican nationality. He mostly played antagonist roles.

Cámara died on 24 February 2016. He was 82.

== Filmography ==
=== Films ===
Year	Title	Role	Notes	Ref.
1970	Las chicas malas del Padre Méndez		Debut film	
1970	Fallaste corazón			
1972	Una mujer honesta			
1973	El monasterio de los buitres			
1974	Conserje en condominio	Jorge		
1974	En busca de un muro	Eisenstein		
1975	Aventuras de un caballo blanco y un niño			
1976	Supervivientes de los Andes			
1979	La guerra santa	Padre Soler		
1981	La leyenda de Rodrígo			
1985	Masacre en el río Tula	El Che		
1990	Y tú.. quién eres?			
1990	La guerra contra las drogas			
1992	Gata por liebre	Otto		
1997	Una luz en la oscuridad			
2009	Sabel Redemption	Mikail Tazzer		

=== Television ===
Year	Title	Role	Notes	Ref.
1960	La rival		Television debut	
1961	La otra	Álvaro		
1961	Hacia la luz			
1964	San Martín de Porres			
1967	Doña Bárbara	El Socio		
1969	Pablo y Alicia			
1969	Cadenas de angustia			
1970	La Gata	El Tilico		
1971	Lucía Sombra	Dr. Pablo Orazabal		
1971	El amor tiene cara de mujer	Alfredo Bustamante		
1972	El carruaje			
1978-1979	Viviana	Don Jesús		
1979	Los ricos también lloran	Fernando		
1979	El cielo es para todos			
1980	Espejismo	Román		
1980	Winnetou le mescalero	Mortimer		
1981-1982	Infamia	Inspector Carmona		
1982	Vanessa	Dr. Servín		
1982	Por amor	Rosendo		
1983-1984	La fiera	Lorenzo Martínez Bustamante		
1984	Principessa	Máximo		
1985	Juana Iris	Nicolás Miranda		
1986-1987	Cuna de lobos	Reynaldo Gutiérrez		
1988-1989	El extraño retorno de Diana Salazar	Luther Henrich / Franz Webber		
1989-1990	Carrusel	Dr. Reynaldo		
1991-1992	Al filo de la muerte	Luigi Valenti		
1992-1993	Mágica juventud	Ezequiel		
1995	Bajo un mismo rostro	Carlos Gorostiaga		
1996	La antorcha encendida	José Antonio Tirado		
1997	El alma no tiene color	Humberto Roldán		
1998	La mentira	Don José "Pepe" Díez		
1998-1999	Soñadoras	Federico Marconi		
2000	Siempre te amaré	Lic. Sandoval		
2001	La intrusa	Rodrigo Junquera #2		
2003	Amor real	Ramón Márquez		
2004	Rubí	José Luis Bermúdez		
2005-2006	Peregrina	Eliseo Alcocer		
2006-2007	La fea más bella	Fausto Domenzaín		
2009-2010	Hasta que el dinero nos separe	Lic. Francisco Beltrán		
2012	La rosa de Guadalupe		3 episodes	

== Awards and nominations ==
=== TVyNovelas Awards ===
Year	Category	Soap opera	Result
2004	Best Leading Actor	Amor real	Won
