= Las Pirañas aman en Cuaresma =

1969 film by Francisco del Villar

- Directed by: Francisco del Villar
- Written by: Hugo Argüelles
- Starring: Isela Vega; Ofelia Medina; Julio Alemán
- Cinematography: Alex Phillips
- Distributed by: Estudios Churubusco Azteca S.A
- Release date: 1969
- Running time: 97 minutes
- Country: Mexico
- Language: Spanish

Las Pirañas aman en Cuaresma (English: The Piranhas love in Lent) is a 1969 Mexican drama film.

== Synopsis ==
After the death of her husband who is devoured by sharks, Eulalia (Isela Vega) along with her daughter Mirta (Ofelia Medina), as two fisherwomen, are rejected by the people in their village, whom she calls "piranhas". A local painter decides to approach them with the purpose of seducing them.

== Cast ==
- Isela Vega
- Ofelia Medina
- Julio Alemán
- Gonzalo Vega
- Macaria
