= Sergio Véjar =

Mexican film director (1928–2009)

- Born: 11 October 1928; Colima, Mexico
- Died: 15 February 2009 (aged 80)
- Occupations: Cinematographer, film director, screenwriter
- Years active: 1947-1999

Sergio Véjar (11 October 1928 – 15 February 2009) was a Mexican cinematographer, film director and screenwriter. His 1963 film Los signos del zodiaco was entered into the 3rd Moscow International Film Festival.

== Selected filmography ==
- Los signos del zodiaco (1963)
- La Casa del Pelícano (1974)
- La Jaula de Oro (1987)
