= Amor de barrio =

Mexican telenovela

- Genre: Telenovela
- Written by: Lenny Ferro; María Auxilio Salado; Guillermo Quezada; Enrique Jiménez
- Story by: Marissa Garrido; Fernanda Villeli
- Directed by: Francisco Franco Alba; Santiago Barbosa Lobaton; Ana Lorena Pérez Ríos
- Creative director: Jimena Galeotti
- Starring: See list
- Music by: Carlos Páramo
- Opening theme: "Cuéntame" by Mane de la Parra and Julión Álvarez
- Ending theme: "Golpes que da la vida" by La Sonora Santanera
- Country of origin: Mexico
- Original language: Spanish
- No. of episodes: 111 (list of episodes)

Production
- Executive producer: Roberto Hernández
- Producer: Liliana Cuesta
- Cinematography: Claudio Lara; Vivian Sánchez Ross
- Editors: Julio Abreu; Juan Franco; Juan José Segundo
- Camera setup: Multi-camera
- Production company: Televisa

Original release
- Network: Canal de las Estrellas
- Release: June 8 – November 8, 2015

Related
- Paloma; Muchacha de barrio

Amor de barrio (Original title in English: Love from the Hood), is a Mexican telenovela produced by Roberto Hernández for Televisa. It is a remake of the 1979 Mexican telenovela, Muchacha de barrio and Paloma produced in 1975.

The series stars Mane de la Parra as Daniel, Renata Notni as Paloma, Pedro Moreno as Raúl, Alejandra García as Laura, Julieta Rosen as Blanca Estela, Marco Muñoz as Gustavo, Manuel Landeta as Edmundo, Juan Carlos Barreto as Ariel, Lisardo Guarinos as Adalberto and Marisol del Olmo as Catalina.

== Plot ==
Living and working in the colorful neighborhood, La Lagunilla, two friends, Paloma and Laura, long for respective boyfriends and true love. Paloma, a law student and waitress, falls for Daniel, a wealthy doctor with a manipulative mother and a family filled with secrets. Laura finds love with Daniel's cousin, Raul, a business manager with his own complicated past.

== Background and production ==
The telenovela premiered on June 8, 2015 at 4:45 p.m., and it aired half-hour-long episodes in the same hour as the telenovela Muchacha italiana viene a casarse, for its first two weeks. Hour long episodes aired in its third week. The program was expected to have 210 episodes. The telenovela was formerly known as "Amores de barrio"; it is a version of the soap operas Muchacha de barrio (1979) and Paloma (1975).

Univision broadcast Amor de barrio On Monday April 11, 2016 weekday afternoons at 2pm/1c replacing an hour of La rosa de Guadalupe. The last episode was broadcast on Friday September 9, 2016 with A que no me dejas replacing it on Monday September 12, 2016.

Production of Amor de barrio officially started on February 23, 2015.

== Promotion ==
The cast and crew of the telenovela were presented for the media at a special screening held at Televisa San Ángel in Mexico City on June 3, 2015. Another presentation at Televisa San Ángel with the cast and live musical performances will stream live for fans on the telenovela's official website on June 4, 2015 at 10:35 p.m.

== Cast ==
=== Main cast ===
- Renata Notni as Paloma Madrigal
- Mané de la Parra as Daniel Márquez

=== Also as main cast ===
- Julieta Rosen as Blanca Estela
- Manuel Landeta as Edmundo Vasconcelos
- Juan Carlos Barreto as Ariel Lopezreina
- Marco Muñoz as Gustavo Mardigal
- Alejandra García as Laura Vasconcelos
- Pedro Moreno as Raúl Lopezreina
- Josh Gutiérrez as Rodrigo
- Jessica Coch as Tamara / Mona Lisa Altamirano
- Cecilia Toussaint as Dalia
- Alejandra Bogue as Kitzia Ariana
- Lisardo Guarinos as Adalberto Cruz
- Montserrat Marañón as Rosa Arriaga
- Paul Stanley as Gabriel Madrigal
- Claudette Maillé as Delfina
- Gabriela Carrillo as Eugenia Uckerman
- Fernanda Arozqueta as Dora Luz
- Marisol del Olmo as Catalina Lopezreina

=== Supporting cast ===
- Marcela Moret as Mirtha
- Andrés Almeida as Paúl Dumont
- Gilberto de Anda as Claudio Ukerman
- Moisés Suárez as Hermes
- Carlos Speitzer as Josh
- Alex Perla as Tico

=== Special participation ===
- Queta Lavat as Zelma
- Alexander Holtmann as Walter

== Mexico broadcast ==
Timeslot (ET/PT)	No. of episodes	Premiered		Ended	
Timeslot (ET/PT)	No. of episodes	Date	Premiere Ratings	Date	Finale Ratings
Monday to Friday 4:45 p.m.	111	June 8, 2015	16.7	November 8, 2015	14.7
