= El tejedor de milagros =

1962 film

- Directed by: Francisco del Villar
- Written by: Julio Alejandro; Hugo Argüelles; Emilio Carballido
- Produced by: Rafael Lebrija
- Starring: Pedro Armendáriz
- Cinematography: Gabriel Figueroa
- Edited by: José W. Bustos
- Release date: 27 December 1962
- Running time: 95 minutes
- Country: Mexico
- Language: Spanish

El tejedor de milagros ("The Weaver of Miracles") is a 1962 Mexican drama film directed by Francisco del Villar. It was entered into the 12th Berlin International Film Festival.

== Cast ==
- Pedro Armendáriz
- Columba Domínguez
- Begoña Palacios
- Sergio Bustamante
- Enrique Lucero
- Aurora Clavel
- Hortensia Santoveña
- José Gálvez
- José Luis Jiménez
- Pilar Souza
- Fanny Schiller
- Ada Carrasco
- Virginia Manzano
- Sadi Dupeyrón
- Lupe Carriles
- Miguel Suárez
- Victorio Blanco
- Socorro Avelar
