= Cadenas de angustia =

Mexican telenovela

- Genre: Telenovela
- Country of origin: Mexico
- Original language: Spanish

Original release
- Network: Telesistema Mexicano

Cadenas de Angustia, is a Mexican telenovela produced by Televisa and originally transmitted by Telesistema Mexicano.

== Cast ==
- Magda Guzmán
- Carlos Cámara
- Teresa Selma
- Luis Aragón
