= Las amantes del señor de la noche =

1986 film by Isela Vega

Las Amantes del Señor de la Noche
- Directed by: Isela Vega
- Written by: Hugo Arguelles; Isela Vega
- Starring: Isela Vega; Irma Serrano; Emilio Fernández; Lilia Prado
- Cinematography: Angel Bilvatua
- Edited by: Federico Landeros
- Music by: Pedro Plasencia
- Distributed by: Producciones Fénix
- Release date: 1986
- Running time: 90 minutes
- Country: Mexico
- Language: Spanish

Las Amantes del Señor de la Noche (The Lovers of the Lord of the Night) is a 1986 Mexican horror film.

== Synopsis ==
Venusita (Elena de Haro) falls in love with the son of a wealthy family whose mother sends her son off to the United States in order to keep the two apart. Not to be rejected so easily, Venusita visits Saurina (Irma Serrano) the sorceress who comes up with a spell that kills off the merchant and zaps the son back home, but Venusita's problems are far from over.

== Cast ==
- Isela Vega... Nana Amparo
- Irma Serrano... Saurina
- Elena de Haro...Venusita
- Emilio Fernández... Don Venustiano
- Lilia Prado... Celina
- Arturo Vázquez... Pedro
- Andres García... Amparo's Lover

== Production Notes ==
The movie is about witchcraft and a passion thriller around it. It was written by a very known Mexican writer Hugo Argüelles in conjunction with Isela Vega. Great actors appear in the movie including Emilio Fernández and the always enigmatic Irma Serrano who is already celebrity of its own. This film passed unnoticed in Mexico in part thanks to the lousy distribution system of that time, which used to privilege the foreign movies. Nowadays there are no longer Mexican movies so the distributors no longer have the concern of programming Mexican movies. The movie could have turned into a cult movie. It has a good plot, good intentions, interesting actors and low budget.
