= The She-Wolf (1965 film) =

- Theatrical release poster
- Directed by: Rafael Baledón
- Written by: Ramón Obón
- Produced by: Jesús Sotomayor Martínez
- Starring: Kitty de Hoyos
- Cinematography: Raúl Martínez Solares
- Edited by: Rafael Ceballos
- Music by: Raúl Lavista
- Distributed by: Columbia Pictures
- Release date: 1965
- Running time: 85 mins
- Country: Mexico
- Language: Spanish

The She-Wolf (Spanish: La Loba, or Los Horrores del Bosque Negro) is a 1965 Mexican horror film directed by Rafael Baledón and starring Kitty de Hoyos as a female werewolf.

== Plot ==
A young attractive woman from a rich Mexican family is under a curse that causes her to transform into a wolf-woman at night and kill people. She falls in love with the doctor she sees (in order to get cured from her curse) who is also a werewolf. Unfortunately for both, their love-filled killing spree comes to an end when they are killed by a trained, werewolf-killing dog.

== Cast ==
- Kitty de Hoyos as Clarisa Fernández
- Joaquín Cordero as Dr. Alejandro Bernstein
- Columba Domínguez as Marcela de Fernández
- José Elías Moreno as Professor Fernández
- Roberto Cañedo as Dr. González
- Noé Murayama as Cazador de Lobos
- Adriana Roel as Alicia Fernández
- Crox Alvarado as Crumba
- Ramón Bugarini as Inspector
- Judith Dupeyrón as Adelita
- Jorge Russek as Comisario
- Hortensia Santoveña
- Margarita Delgado
- José Dupeyrón

== Reception ==
Dave Sindelar from Fantastic Movie Musings and Ramblings called it "one of the more impressive Mexican horror films":, praising the film's atmosphere, attack sequences, and make-up effects.

== Music ==
The music was written by Raúl Lavista, one of Mexico's most prolific film composers. Lavista scored hundreds of Mexican films from the 1930s through the 1970s, often in horror, melodrama, and lucha libre genres. His music style often mixed orchestral suspense scoring with traditional Mexican motifs, giving horror films like La Loba a dramatic, eerie atmosphere. Unfortunately, there is no known commercial soundtrack release of La Loba. The score exists only within the film itself.
