= Antonio González Caballero =

- Born: 1927; San Luis Potosí, Mexico
- Died: 2003 (aged 75–76); Mexico City, Mexico
- Occupation: Screenwriter
- Known for: Nilo, mi hijo

Antonio González Caballero (Latin American Spanish pronunciation: [anˈtonjo ɣonˈsales kaβaˈʎeɾo]; 1927–2003) was a Mexican painter, pedagogue and screenwriter. His best-known work is the play Nilo, mi hijo, on which the film La casa del pelícano is based.

He was born in San Luis Potosí and died in the historic center of Mexico City.

== Works ==
- Señoritas a Disgusto (1960)
- Una pura y dos con sal (1961)
- El medio pelo (1962)
- Nilo, mi hijo (1963)
- Los jóvenes asoleados (1965)
- Tres en Josafat (1965)
- Las vírgenes prudentes (1967)
- La ciudad de los carrizos (1967)
- Asesino imperfecto (1967)
- Una reverenda madre (1968)
- El estupendhombre (1971)
- Las devoradoras de un ardiente helado (1972)
- El mago (1973)
- Los amigos o La proliferación (1975)
- Amorosos amorales (1980)
- El retablo (1982)
- Vicente y María (1984)
- ¿Quiere usted concursar? (1985)
- El Plop o Cómo escapar de la niebla (1990)
- La maraña (1990)
- El pisapapel (1991)
- Cuestión de opiniones en regla de tres acerca del yo (1991)
- En ausencia de... (1992)
- Las embarazadas (1992)
- Amordidas (1993)
- Los nudistas del buzón sentimental (1993)
- El siniestro y escalofriante doctor Frederik Ludwing von Mamerto o Antes de ver a un psicólogo consulta con tu abogado o Y tú, ¿quién eres? (1993)
- Delito en el escenario (1994)
- La señora y sus amibas (1997)
- Vete al diablo, vida mía (1999)

== Nilo, mi hijo ==
Nilo, mi hijo is the most famous work by Caballero. It was filmed under the title La casa del pelícano ("The House of the Pelican").

The main character Nilo was played by well known and beloved Enrique Álvarez Félix. Nilo's raped mother Margarita was Jacqueline Andere, and young Daniela Romo also appeared.

The film was shocking for some commentators who noticed a connection between castration of Nilo and Enrique's difficult relationship with his mother.

On the poster for the film an egg is depicted. It is pierced by scissors. This is a symbolic representation of emasculation.
