= Espejismo (TV series) =

- Genre: Telenovela
- Created by: Estela Calderón
- Directed by: Manolo García
- Starring: Fanny Cano; Carlos Piñar; Enrique Rocha; Charito Granados; Carmen Molina; Felipe Gil
- Opening theme: Espejismo by Felipe Gil
- Country of origin: Mexico
- Original language: Spanish

Production
- Executive producer: Fernando Chacón
- Cinematography: Manuel Ruiz Esparza

Original release
- Network: Canal de las Estrellas
- Release: December 29, 1980 – August 14, 1981

Related
- Espejismo Infamia

Espejismo (English title: Illusion) is a Mexican telenovela produced by Fernando Chacón for Televisa between December 29, 1980 and August 14, 1981. It starred by Fanny Cano, Carlos Piñar, Enrique Rocha, Charito Granados and Carmen Molina.

== Cast ==
- Fanny Cano as Laura
- Carlos Piñar as Raúl
- Enrique Rocha as Julio
- Charito Granados as Andrea
- Carmen Molina as Martha
- Felipe Gil as Rafael
- Nerina Ferrer as Emma
- Liliana Abud as Susana
- Carlos Cámara as Román
- Manuel Saval as Juan José
- Carmen del Valle as Lina
- Tere Valadez as Elvira
- Rosalba Brambila as Gaby
- Fabian Lavalle
- Nancy Mackienze
- Rosario Granados
- Alejandro Tomassi
- Oscar Servin as Dr. Zubieta
- Enrique Barrera as Alberto
- Carmelita Gonzalez as Elena
