= El retrato de Dorian Gray =

- Also known as: The Picture of Dorian Gray
- Genre: Telenovela
- Written by: Oscar Wilde
- Directed by: Ernesto Alonso
- Starring: Enrique Álvarez Félix
- Country of origin: Mexico
- Original language: Spanish

Original release
- Network: Telesistema Mexicano

The Picture of Dorian Gray (El retrato de Dorian Gray), is a 1969 Mexican telenovela, based on the 1890 novel The Picture of Dorian Gray by Oscar Wilde. The main character is the handsome young man called Dorian Gray (played by late Enrique Álvarez Félix).

== Cast ==
- Enrique Álvarez Félix as Dorian Gray
- Carlos Bracho as Lord Henry
- Carmen Montejo as Lady Wooton
- Blanca Sánchez as Verónica
- Nelly Meden as Elizabeth
- Silvia Pasquel as Sybil Vane
- Alicia Montoya
- Claudia Islas
- Anita Blanch as Lady Agatha
- Héctor Sáez as James Vane

== See also ==
- Adaptations of The Picture of Dorian Gray
