= Frida Still Life =

1983 film

- Directed by: Paul Leduc
- Written by: José Joaquín Blanco; Paul Leduc
- Produced by: Manuel Barbachano Ponce-Clasa Films Mundiales
- Starring: Ofelia Medina
- Cinematography: Ángel Goded
- Edited by: Rafael Castanedo
- Music by: Rafael Castanedo
- Release date: 1983
- Running time: 108 minutes
- Country: Mexico
- Language: Spanish

Frida Still Life (Spanish: Frida, naturaleza viva) is a 1983 Mexican drama film about artists Frida Kahlo and Diego Rivera directed by Paul Leduc. The film was selected as the Mexican entry for the Best Foreign Language Film at the 58th Academy Awards, but was not accepted as a nominee.

== Cast ==
- Ofelia Medina as Frida Kahlo
- Juan José Gurrola as Diego Rivera
- Max Kerlow as Leon Trotsky
- Claudio Brook as Guillermo Kahlo
- Salvador Sánchez as David Alfaro Siqueiros
- Cecilia Toussaint as Frida's sister Christina
- Ziwta Kerlow as Trotsky's Wife
- Margarita Sanz as Frida's friend

== Plot ==
Frida Still Life opens with Frida Kahlo's coffin laid out in the Bellas Artes palace in Mexico City. Throughout the film, we see a series of flashbacks of Kahlo's life as she lies on her deathbed. The flashbacks show her relationship with Diego Rivera and Leon Trotsky, as well as her artwork, miscarriages, and physical ailments.

== Reception ==
=== Critical response ===
Frida Still Life has been classified as a prime example of New Latin American Cinema of the 1960s and early '70s by film scholars such as Paul A. Schroeder Rodríguez, especially in the way it depicts Frida Kahlo as a marginalized subject. Additionally, film critics admire its use of mirrors as a way to show Kahlo's unique point of view.

=== Awards ===
The film was honored with the Gran Coral as the Best Picture of the 1984 Havana Film Festival of New Latin American Cinema (NCLA), and Ofelia Medina, in the role of Frida, received a Coral as the Best Actress.

== See also ==
- List of submissions to the 58th Academy Awards for Best Foreign Language Film
- List of Mexican submissions for the Academy Award for Best Foreign Language Film
