= El puente roto =

Song by Irma Serrano

from the album Mexican Fire
- Language: Spanish
- English title: "The Broken Bridge"
- Released: 1966
- Genre: Ranchera
- Length: 2:37
- Label: CBS
- Songwriter: Víctor Cordero

"El puente roto" (English: "The Broken Bridge") is a ranchera song by Mexican recording artist Irma Serrano, from her sixth studio album, Mexican Fire (1966). The most popular interpretation is that of Irma Serrano, for which she won a Candelario Azteca de Oro Award.

== Charts ==
Chart (1966)	Peak position
Mexico (Audiomusica)	4
