= Francisco del Villar =

Mexican film director

- Born: 1920
- Died: September 1, 1978 (aged 57–58)
- Occupations: Film director Film producer Screenwriter
- Years active: 1952-1978

Francisco del Villar (1920 – 1 September 1978) was a Mexican film director, producer and screenwriter. He directed 22 films between 1952 and 1975. His film El tejedor de milagros was entered into the 12th Berlin International Film Festival.

== Selected filmography ==
- El tejedor de milagros (1962)
- Los Cuervos están de luto (1965)
- Las Pirañas aman en Cuaresma (1969)
- El Monasterio de los Buitres (1973)
- La Viuda Negra (1977 - writer)
- El lugar sin límites (1978 - producer)
