= El manantial del milagro =

Mexican telenovela

- Genre: Telenovela
- Created by: Original Story: Vicente Leñero; Adaptation: Fernanda Villeli
- Directed by: Julio Castillo
- Starring: Julissa; Enrique Álvarez Félix; Ana Martín; Lorena Velázquez; Ofelia Guilmáin; Tony Carbajal
- Country of origin: Mexico
- Original language: Spanish
- No. of episodes: 173

Production
- Executive producer: Ernesto Alonso

Original release
- Network: Canal de las Estrellas
- Release: 1974 – 1974

Related
- El juramento; Siempre habrá un mañana

El manantial del milagro, is a Mexican telenovela directed by Julio Castillo and produced by Ernesto Alonso for Televisa in 1974. Starring by Julissa and Enrique Álvarez Félix.

== Synopsis ==
The story of this telenovela revolves around a mysterious fountain, said to have healing powers.

== Cast ==
Actor	Character
Julissa	Matilde
Enrique Álvarez Félix†	Pablo / Miguel
Ofelia Guilmáin†	Luz
Lorena Velázquez	Elena
Agustín Sauret	Gonzalo
Ana Lorena Graham	Paola
Tony Carbajal†	Agustín
Ana Martín	Blanca
Juan Ferrara	Carlos
Rita Macedo†	Estela
Alicia Montoya†	Sofía
Mercedes Pascual†	Yolanda
Carlos Riquelme†	Pepe
Lucy Tovar†	Angélica
Malena Doria†	Marta
Felipe Ramos	Jorge
Manuel Rivera	Rodolfo Bustamante
José Baviera†	Padre Anselmo
Rubén Rojo†	Ramón
Fabiola Falcón	Regina
Carlos Rotzinger	El Coreano
Giorgio Fleri	Giuliano Montefiore
Tomás I. Jaime	Catarino
Olga Morris	Katy
José Luis Moreno	Carrillo
Antonio Medellín†	Armando
Silvia Mawath	Silvia
Orville Martin	Dr. Martin
