= Muchacha de barrio =

Mexican telenovela

- Genre: Telenovela
- Created by: Fernanda Villeli
- Directed by: Ernesto Alonso
- Starring: Ana Martín; Humberto Zurita; Kitty de Hoyos; Guillermo Murray; Magda Guzmán
- Theme music composer: Guillermo Juárez
- Opening theme: "Te vi pasar" by Lolita de la Colina
- Country of origin: Mexico
- Original language: Spanish
- No. of episodes: 202

Production
- Executive producer: Ernesto Alonso
- Cinematography: Alfredo Saldaña
- Editor: Marco A.Gomez

Original release
- Network: Canal de las Estrellas
- Release: 1979 – 1980

Related
- Amor de barrio (2015)

Muchacha de barrio (English: Neighborhood Girl) is a Mexican telenovela produced by Ernesto Alonso for Canal de las Estrellas in 1979. Ana Martín, Humberto Zurita and Guillermo Murray star as the protagonists.

== Plot ==
Laura is cheerful and lively neighborhood girl that lives with her mother Rosa and stepfather Pancho. With her accounting studies, Laura gets a job in the newspaper owned by Pablo Moncada, where he works with his adoptive son Raul. Laura and Raul get to know each other and fall in love, but due to various circumstances, including family secrets that come to light, they have to separate, although in the end they will find true happiness.

== Cast ==
- Ana Martín as Laura Martinez
- Kitty de Hoyos as Susana / La Chata
- Guillermo Murray as Pablo Moncada
- Magda Guzmán as Rosa de Martinez
- Sergio Jiménez as Pancho Martinez
- René Casados as Ernesto Moncada
- Humberto Zurita as Raúl Moncada
- Nubia Martí as Denise Da Silva
- Tony Bravo as Norberto
- Patricia Rivera as Elena Jimenez
- Ana Laura Maldonado as Deborah Salinas
- Martha Zavaleta as Delfina
- Ernesto Bañuelos as Juan Morales "Joao"
- Jorge del Campo as Víctor Jimenez
- Héctor Flores as Dr. Galindo
- Oscar Morelli as Eugenio Salinas
- Martha Patricia as Isabel de Salinas
