= Paul Leduc (film director) =

Mexican film director (1942-2020)

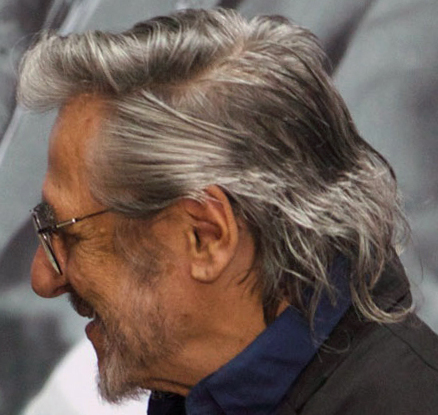
- Leduc filming
- Born: Paul Leduc Rosenzweig; 11 March 1942; Mexico City, Mexico
- Died: 21 October 2020 (aged 78)
- Education: Universidad Nacional Autónoma de México (the National Autonomous University of Mexico)
- Occupation: Film director
- Years active: 1968 – 2020
- Children: Daughter – Valentina Leduc Navarro Son - Juan Leduc Riley

Paul Leduc Rosenzweig (11 March 1942 – 21 October 2020) was a Mexican film director.

One of Leduc's most acclaimed works is Frida, naturaleza viva (1983 – marketed as Frida in the U.S.), a tribute to the indomitable spirit and determination of the painter Frida Kahlo.

== Overview ==
Paul Leduc Rosenzweig studied architecture and theatre, at the Universidad Nacional Autónoma de México; attended a French film school, Institut des hautes études cinématographiques (IDHEHC). His film career began in a university department of film studies. His first films were documentaries. Leduc like other filmmakers of his time was seeking answers to create a form of cinema capable of “affirming our culture and our language. Daring the encounter with our originality-and with reality, the profound relationship with what happens to us and what entertains, afflicts or liberates us.”

Leduc was able to launch his career due to a unique situation. During the reign of President Luis Echeverría (1970–76) the Mexican government actively intervened as a producer of cinema. Under this new policy the government paid for the amplification of Reed: Insurgent Mexico to 35 mm. This was the only time the Mexican government intervened in one of Leduc's films. For the rest of his career he funded his films independently, through universities and unions, and with collective efforts. Leduc's works reflects a person's concern for certainty. Etnocidio: notas sobre el Mezquital is a powerful documentary on the extermination of the native peoples in Latin America. This documentary shows how the Otomi Indians of the Mezquital region in Mexico relate to their experiences with “civilized” society. The creation of the film was through a collaborative effort, the “script” was written by Roger Bartra, Mexico's top leading rural sociologist. This film was based on Bartra's years of research in the Mezquital region.

== Critically acclaimed films ==
Reed: Insurgent Mexico is one of Leduc's most accomplished fictions in film, and was the first really distinctive work of the "New Cinema" movement in Mexico. The film was produced on a very small budget with a 16 mm camera. Purposely undramatic, Reed interprets the Mexican revolution (1910–17) in a way that had not been seen since Fernando De Fuentes's masterpieces of 1933–35. This film provides the viewer with a beautiful sepia tone which helps reproduce the environment of historic revolutionary setting. A Mexican critic, Jorge Ayala Blanco, described Reed as "raging against, incinerating, and annihilating the spider web that had been knitted over the once-living image of the revolution, while briefly illuminating the nocturnal ruins of our temporal and cultural distance from the men who participated in that upheaval." The film is a dramatization of John Reed's famous account of the Mexican revolution, Insurgent Mexico, with Reed as the main character.

Leduc's most critically acclaimed film is Frida: Naturaleza viva. This film is regarded as a highly expressionist and lyrical work on the famous Mexican painter Frida Kahlo. Leduc is credited with succeeding in recreating Frida's passionate existence and her pain. This film kept words to a minimum whether spoken or written. This style was highly experimental. Leduc breaks from traditional cinematographic styles, the absence of dialogue, to reduce the famous figures of history and culture such as Frida Kahlo to cartoons of themselves. He uses the film to develop these characters in a way that allows them to remain at the lowest common denominator of the popular stereotypes fomented in mass culture. What makes this film unique is the sense of time. “The director observes no sense of chronology, moving forwards and backwards in time as Frida grows younger or older, scene by scene.”

== Documentaries ==
Leduc produced several documentaries, among them:

- Parto psicoprofiláctico (1969)
- Bach y sus intérpretes (1975)
- Etnocidio: notas sobre el Mezquital; Estudios para un retrato ( Francis Bacon ) (1978)
- Puebla hoy (1978)
- Monjas coronadas (1978)
- ABC del etnocidio: notas sobre el Mezquital (1976), and
- Puebla hoy (1979).

== Films ==
Leduc also produced films about historical events, such as:

- Comunicados del comité nacional de huelga (1968)
- Reed: México insurgente (1973), a dramatization based on the firsthand reports of the Mexican Revolution by journalist John Reed.
- Sur, sureste 2604; El mar (1974)
- Historias prohibidas de Pulgarcito (1979)
- Complót petróleo: la cabeza de la hidra (1981).
- ¿Cómo ves? (Whaddya Think?) (1982)
- Frida Still Life (Frida: Naturaleza viva) (1983)
- Barroco (Baroque) (1989)
- Dólar mambo (1993).
- Latino Bar (1995)
- Los Animales 1850–1950 (1995)

== Work cited ==
1. "Film Reference." Paul Leduc. N.p., n.d. Web. 08 Nov. 2015.
2. Pick, Zuzana (1993). The New Latin America Cinema, Austin: University of Texas Press, p. 36
3. Schwartz, Ronald (1997), Latin American Film, 1932-1994, Jefferson, North Carolina: McFarlad & Company, Inc., p. 102

== See also ==
- Bertha Navarro
