= Los cuervos están de luto =

- Directed by: Francisco del Villar
- Written by: Hugo Argüelles; Julio Alejandro
- Produced by: Rafael Lebrija; Francisco del Villar
- Starring: Silvia Pinal; Lilia Prado; Kitty de Hoyos
- Cinematography: Raúl Martínez Solares
- Edited by: Rafael Ceballos
- Distributed by: Sagitario Films
- Release date: 28 October 1965
- Running time: 90 minutes
- Country: Mexico
- Language: Spanish

Los cuervos están de luto (English: The Crows are in Mourning) is a 1965 Mexican comedy film directed by Francisco del Villar and starring Silvia Pinal, Lilia Prado and Kitty de Hoyos. This film is based on the play of the same name by Mexican author Hugo Argüelles. It was shot at Estudios Churubusco.

== Plot ==
Don Lacho (José Luis Jiménez), a greedy old man, is about to die. His three children, but mainly his daughter-in-law Piedad (Silvia Pinal), are anxiously awaiting his death to collect the inheritance, but the old man refuses to die.

In his hallucinations, the old man sees the ghost of his dead wife (Kitty de Hoyos), who reveals that one of his three children is not his child. The man takes his last moments to torment all in doubt.

Things get complicated on the arrival of his third child with his wife (Lilia Prado) and by the indiscretions of the townspeople.

== Cast ==
- Silvia Pinal as Piedad
- Lilia Prado as Mariana
- Kitty de Hoyos as a Wife's ghost
- Narciso Busquets as Mateo
- José Luis Jiménez as don Lacho
- José Gálvez as Gelasio
- Enrique Álvarez Félix as Enrique
- Fanny Schiller
- Ada Carrasco
- Manuel Zozaya
- Dalia Íñiguez
