= La casa del pelícano =

- Promotional poster
- Directed by: Sergio Véjar
- Screenplay by: Jorge Patiño
- Story by: Jorge Patiño
- Based on: Nilo, mi hijo by Antonio González Caballero
- Starring: Jacqueline Andere; Daniela Romo; Enrique Álvarez Félix
- Cinematography: Rosalío Solano
- Edited by: Joaquín Ceballos
- Music by: Luis H. Bretón
- Distributed by: Conacine
- Release date: 23 November 1978 (Mexico)
- Running time: 85 minutes
- Country: Mexico
- Language: Spanish

La casa del pelícano ("The House of the Pelican") is a 1978 Mexican thriller film. It was shot in 1976 and released in 1978. Main themes of this film are rape and difficult possessive relationship between mother and her son.

Young Enrique Álvarez Félix played Nilo in this film. This was his most famous film role. Nilo was castrated at the end of the film, and this was interesting for some spectators who noticed that Enrique had a difficult relationship with his mother in his real life.

This film was based on the play Nilo, mi hijo by Antonio González Caballero.

== Plot ==
Elementary school teacher Margarita Ramírez tries to make her life beautiful once again with her son Nilo. He is a result of a rape in a distant city, but Margarita loves him nonetheless.

Nilo, the son of the madman of the city, tries to grow up in a common way, but his mother overprotects him and raise him away from other people.

== Cast ==
- Jacqueline Andere as Margarita Ramírez, a beautiful woman who bore Nilo after she was raped
- Enrique Álvarez Félix as Nilo Ramírez, Margarita's son; he is not free in his life. At the end, he was castrated by his mother.
- Isabela Corona as Clementina
- Rosa Furman as Amelia
- Carlos Agostí – An uncle of Margarita
- Mónica Prado as Aurelia
- Daniela Romo as Engracia – Young and lovely woman
- Marta Zamora as Serafina
- Carlos Romo as Federico
- Federico Falcón as Domingo, Nilo's father
- Carlos Rotzinger
- León Singer
- Roberto Montiel as Honorio, Margarita's fiancé
- Carlos Villarreal
- Patricia Arredondo
- Cecilia Leger as Justina

== See also ==
- Emasculation
