= Irma Serrano =

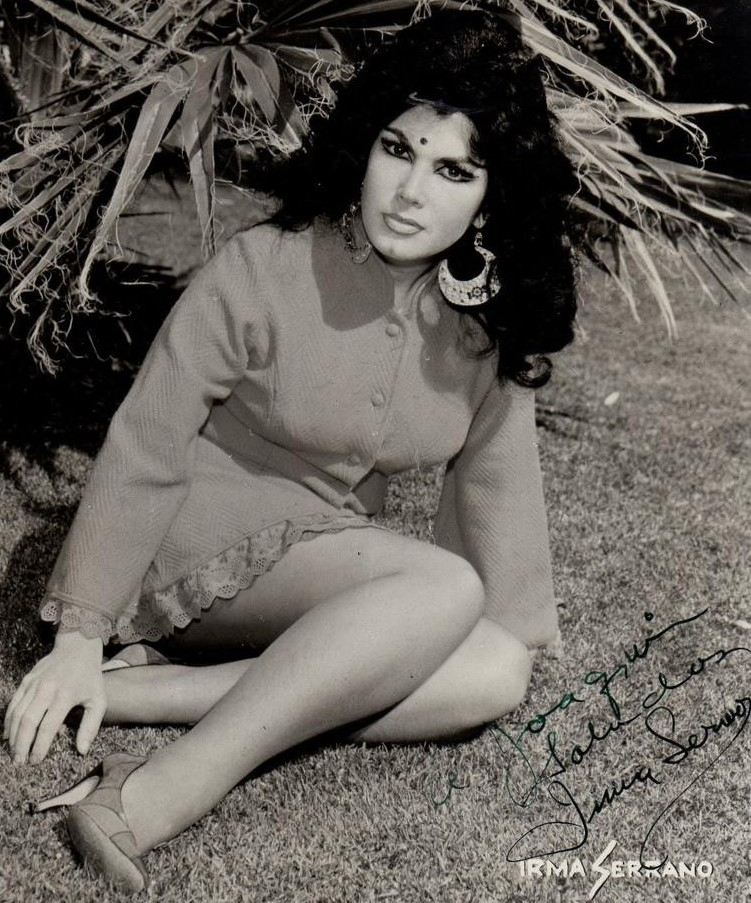
- Serrano, c. 1969
- Born: Irma Consuelo Cielo Serrano Castro; 9 December 1933; Comitán, Chiapas, Mexico
- Died: 1 March 2023 (aged 89)
- Other names: La Tigresa; La Tigresa de la Canción Ranchera
- Occupations: Singer; actress; politician; theatrical entrepreneur; author
- Years active: 1962–2005
- Partner(s): Gustavo Díaz Ordaz; Alejo Peralta
- Relatives: Rosario Castellanos (cousin)
- Musical career
- Genres: Ranchera; corrido; folk; chanson; estrada; romance
- Instruments: Vocals; guitar
- Labels: Columbia; Harmony; Peerless

Irma Consuelo Cielo Serrano Castro (Spanish pronunciation: [ˈiɾma konˈswelo ˈsjelo seˈrano ˈkastɾo]; 9 December 1933 – 1 March 2023) was a Mexican singer, actress and politician. Famous for her "tantalizing" "untamed spitfire" voice, she was one of the most noted performers of the ranchera and corrido genres; she was nicknamed La Tigresa de la Canción Ranchera (The Rancheras Tigress) and later known simply as "La Tigresa" (Spanish pronunciation: [la ti´ɣɾesa]). At the same time, she pursued a film career with more than a dozen films. At the time of her death, she was one of the last surviving actresses from the Golden Age of Mexican cinema.

In the 1970s and 1980s, Serrano achieved great success as an actress and producer in a series of controversial stage plays, especially the controversial play Naná (1973). In the 1990s, she also ventured into politics and occupied a seat in the Mexican Senate. In her later years, she was the center of multiple scandals and controversies. She appeared in celebrity gossip magazines and television shows because of her political career as senator for her home state of Chiapas from 1994 to 1997.

== Early life ==
Serrano was the third of three children (Mario, Yolanda, and Irma). Her father, Santiago Serrano Ruiz "El Chanti" (25 July 1897 – 17 December 1957), was a distinguished author, poet, and politician born in Suchiapa. Her mother, María Castro Domínguez, was a local aristocrat who owned various haciendas. Her older siblings were Mario and Yolanda. Her parents divorced when she was 7 years old. She was a cousin of poet, author, and diplomat Rosario Castellanos.

== Career ==
=== Music ===
Irma Serrano began her artistic career as a dancer in the choreographic group directed by the dancer Chelo La Rué. Later, Serrano began her career as singer when signing a contract with Columbia Records in 1962. In 1963, she won several awards such as the Folklore Revelation Trophy, the Macuilxóchitl as the Revelation Songwriter and the Musa Trophy of Radiolandia. Serrano became one of the most popular Mexican folk music artists of the 1960s. One of her most remembered songs is the corrido of La Martina, considered a classic of the Mexican folk genre.

=== Film ===
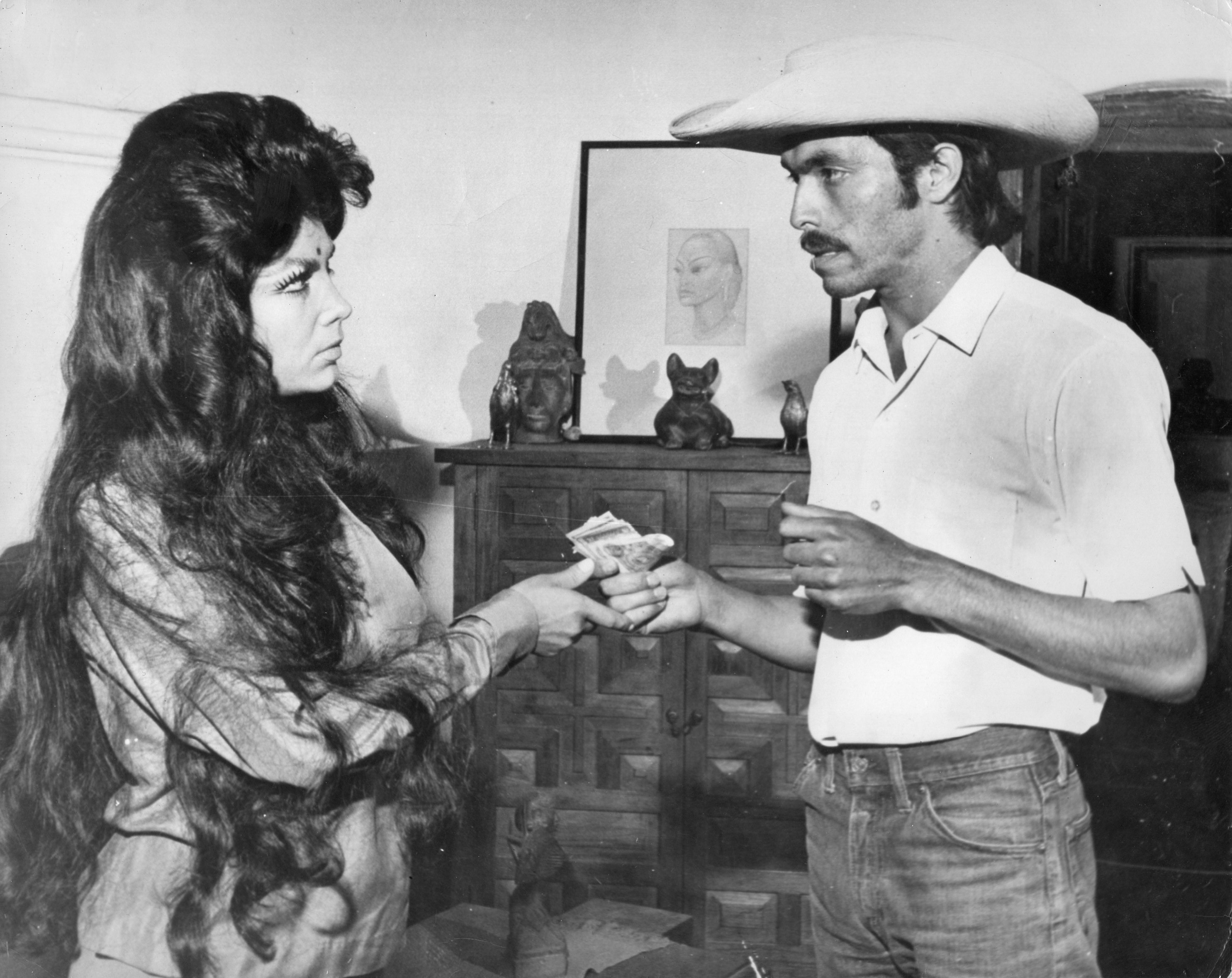
Serrano with Rigoberto Carmona, c. 1968

She began her career in films at age 29 in the movie Samson vs. the Zombies, starring the popular Mexican wrestler El Santo (Samson). She worked on films like The Extra (1962), opposite Cantinflas, Tiburoneros (1963, directed by Luis Alcoriza), and Gabino Barrera (1964) along with the actor and singer Antonio Aguilar, among others. From 1968, she began to use the pseudonym of La Tigresa (The Tigress), taken from a comic that she herself starred in due to its popularity. In the 1970s she participated in her best films. In 1972, she starred in La Martina, inspired by her most popular song. In 1973 she starred in the fantastic film La Tigresa. In that same year, she worked in the film The Monastery of the Vultures of the filmmaker Francisco del Villar.

At the end of the 1970s and during the 1980s, Serrano's appearances at the movies were rather sporadic. She performed special performances in films like Cabaret Nights (1978) and Lola la trailera (1982). In 1985 she produced Naná, inspired by the controversial stage play of the same name in which she herself starred years before. In 1986, Serrano made her last major film performance in the horror film The Lovers of the Lord of the Night next to Isela Vega and Emilio Fernández.

=== Theater ===
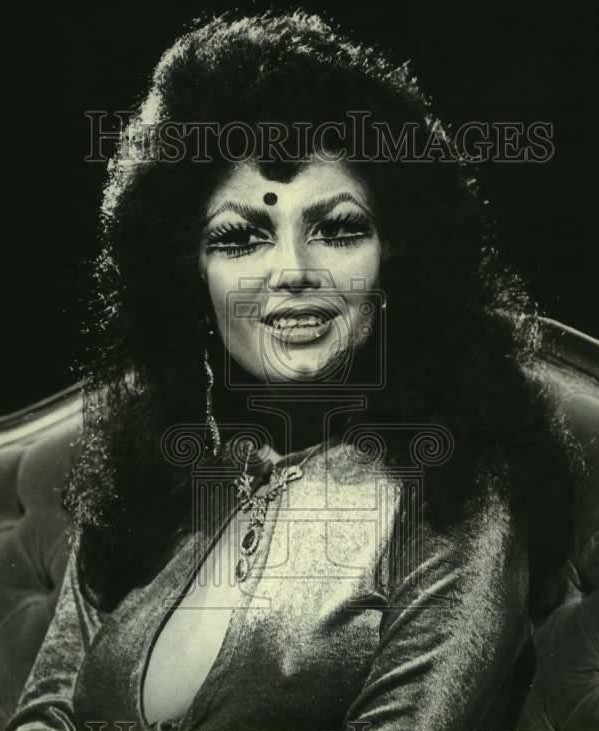
Serrano in 1975

In 1972, Serrano acquired the old Virginia Fábregas Theater, located in Calle Donceles in Mexico City's Historic Center. The actress remodeled the theater and renamed it Teatro Fru Fru. From the 1970s, Serrano starred in and produced a series of theatrical montages that caused controversy, particularly Naná (1973), a free adaptation of Serrano of the novel of the same name by Émile Zola. The stage play was produced by Serrano and directed by Maricela Lara. Naná caused controversy in Mexico because of its highly erotic content, and it remained on the billboard for four uninterrupted years (1973–1977).

In 1977, Serrano partnered with actor, producer, writer and director Alejandro Jodorowsky to perform the stage play Lucrecia Borgia. Nevertheless, the differences between the two caused a dispute that led to them independently producing their own versions of the work.

Other stage plays starring Serrano in the Teatro Fru Frú were A Lady Without Camelias (1977), Oh ... Calcutta (1977), Yocasta Reina (1978), The Cross-legged War (1979) and the autobiographical A calzón amarrado (1980, based on the controversial book published by La Tigresa a little earlier). In addition to starring in these works, Serrano also served as co-producer, co-director and co-author of the scripts, some along with the director, actor and producer Pablo Leder.

Her last theatrical projects were The Two Emanuele (1984, alongside Isela Vega and also represented in the Million Dollar Theater of Los Angeles) and The Well of Solitude (1985).

As a producer, she also performed a series of theatrical productions, some of them as part of the successful Theater at Midnight concept, created by Pablo Leder for a strictly adult audience. These productions included Emanuele LIVE (1981), Jail for Girls (1981), Vampira! (Emanuele de ultratumba) (1983) and Carmen (2004).

== Personal life ==
It was rumored that Serrano and Mexican president Gustavo Díaz Ordaz had a short-lived romantic liaison. Neither confirmed the rumor until she published her book A calzón amarrado, in which she admitted the affair.

In 1994, Serrano successfully ran for the Senate, representing her home state of Chiapas.

On 25 March 2009, Serrano was arrested in Chiapas and taken into custody to Mexico City's federal.

Serrano resided in Comitán, Chiapas. She died from a heart attack on 1 March 2023, at the age of 89.

== Filmography ==
- 1994 Juana la Cubana
- 1986 The Lovers of the Lord of the Night
- 1985 Nana
- 1983 Lola the Truck Driver
- 1978 Carnival Nights
- 1973 The Monastery of the Vultures
- 1973 The Tigress
- 1973 Santo y el aguila real
- 1972 La Martina
- 1971 La venganza de Gabino Barrera
- 1971 La chamuscada (Tierra y libertad)
- 1968 Los amores de Juan Charrasqueado
- 1968 El caudillo
- 1966 Los malvados
- 1966 El hijo del diablo
- 1966 Los gavilanes negros
- 1965 El hijo de Gabino Barrera
- 1965 Los sheriffs de la frontera
- 1965 La conquista de El Dorado
- 1965 El zurdo
- 1965 Gabino Barrera
- 1964 El corrido de María Pistolas
- 1963 Tiburoneros
- 1962 The Extra
- 1962 Santo contra los zombies

== Television ==
- 2005 La Madrastra (TV series)
- 2004 Hospital el paisa (TV series)
- 1977 Variedades de media noche (TV series)
- 1974 La tierra (TV series)
- 1972 Aun hay mas (TV series)

== Theater ==
=== Actress and producer ===
- Naná (1973)
- A Lady Without Camellias (1977)
- Oh...Calcutta (1977)
- Lucrecia Borgia (1977)
- Yocasta Reina (1978)
- The Cross-legged War (1979)
- A Calzón amarrado (1980)
- The Two Emanuele (1984)
- The Well of Solitude (1985)

=== Producer ===
- Emanuele...Live (1981)
- Jail for Girls (1981)
- Vampira! (Emanuele de Ultratumba) (1983)
- Carmen (2004)

== Selected discography ==
- La Nueva Intérprete de la Canción Ranchera (Columbia, 1964)
- Nuevo "Hits" con Irma Serrano (Columbia, 1965)
- Mexican Fire (Columbia, 1966)
- Con Los Alegres De Teran (Columbia, 1967)
- Lloren Organillos: Folk Songs of Mexico (Columbia, 1967)
- Es Amor (Columbia, 1968)
- Mi Noche de Ayer and Other Folk Songs (Columbia, 1968)
- La Tigresa (Columbia, 1972)
- Irma Serrano con Los Alegres de Terán (Columbia, 1973)
- 15 auténticos éxitos (Columbia, 1984)

== Awards ==
- 1963: Trofeo Revelación Folkórica, Premio Macuilxóchitl como la Cancionista Revelación, Trofeo Musa de Radiolandia.

== Bibliography ==
- SERRANO, Irma / ROBLEDO, Elisa A calzón amarrado Ed. Selector, México (1978) ISBN 9684031645
- SERRANO, Irma / ROBLEDO, Elisa Sin pelos en la lengua Ed. Selector, México (1979) ISBN 9786074530315
- SERRANO, Irma / ROBLEDO, Elisa Una loca en la polaca, Ed. Selector, México (1992) ISBN 9684036493
