= El monasterio de los buitres =

El Monasterio de los Buitres
- Directed by: Francisco del Villar
- Written by: Vicente Leñero
- Starring: Enrique Lizalde; Enrique Álvarez Félix; Irma Serrano "La Tigresa"
- Cinematography: Gabriel Figueroa
- Distributed by: Estudios Churubusco Azteca S.A
- Release date: 1973
- Running time: 102 minutes
- Country: Mexico
- Language: Spanish

El Monasterio de los Buitres (English: "The Monastery of the Vultures") is a Mexican motion picture categorized as religious drama. It was filmed in 1973.

== Synopsis ==
In an old monastery in Mexico, the faith of all the young aspiring priests is tested by the Father Prior using psychoanalysis. During the process, the young men manifested indecision, sexual problems (as incest or homosexuality) and lack of faith.

== Cast ==
- Enrique Lizalde as Father Prior
- Enrique Álvarez Félix as Emilio
- Irma Serrano "La Tigresa" as Amalia
- Augusto Benedico as Pablo
- Enrique Rocha as Andres
- Héctor Bonilla as Marcos
- Otto Sirgo as Juan
- Eduardo Noriega as Don Manuel
- David Estuardo as Antonio
- Jose Chávez as Camilo
- Carlos Cámara
- Margarita de la Fuente as Carmen
