= Los signos del zodiaco =

1963 film

- Directed by: Sergio Véjar
- Written by: Emilio Carballido; Sergio Magaña Hidalgo
- Produced by: Gabriel Torres Garcés
- Starring: Kitty de Hoyos
- Cinematography: Agustín Jiménez
- Distributed by: Metro-Goldwyn-Mayer
- Release date: 1963
- Running time: 100 minutes
- Country: Mexico
- Language: Spanish

Los signos del zodiaco is a 1963 Mexican drama film directed by Sergio Véjar. It was entered into the 3rd Moscow International Film Festival.

== Cast ==
- Kitty de Hoyos as María
- Angélica María as Sofía
- Pilar Souza as Ana Romana
- Luis Bayardo as Pedro Rojo
- Mario García González as Daniel
- Enrique Aguilar Breton as Augusto Sotomayor
- María Eugenia Ríos as Estela
- Marta Zamora as Polita
- Angeles Marrufo
- Yolanda Guillaumin (as Yolanda Guillomán)
- Socorro Avelar as Justina
