= Teatro Fru Fru =

- Teatro Fru Fru
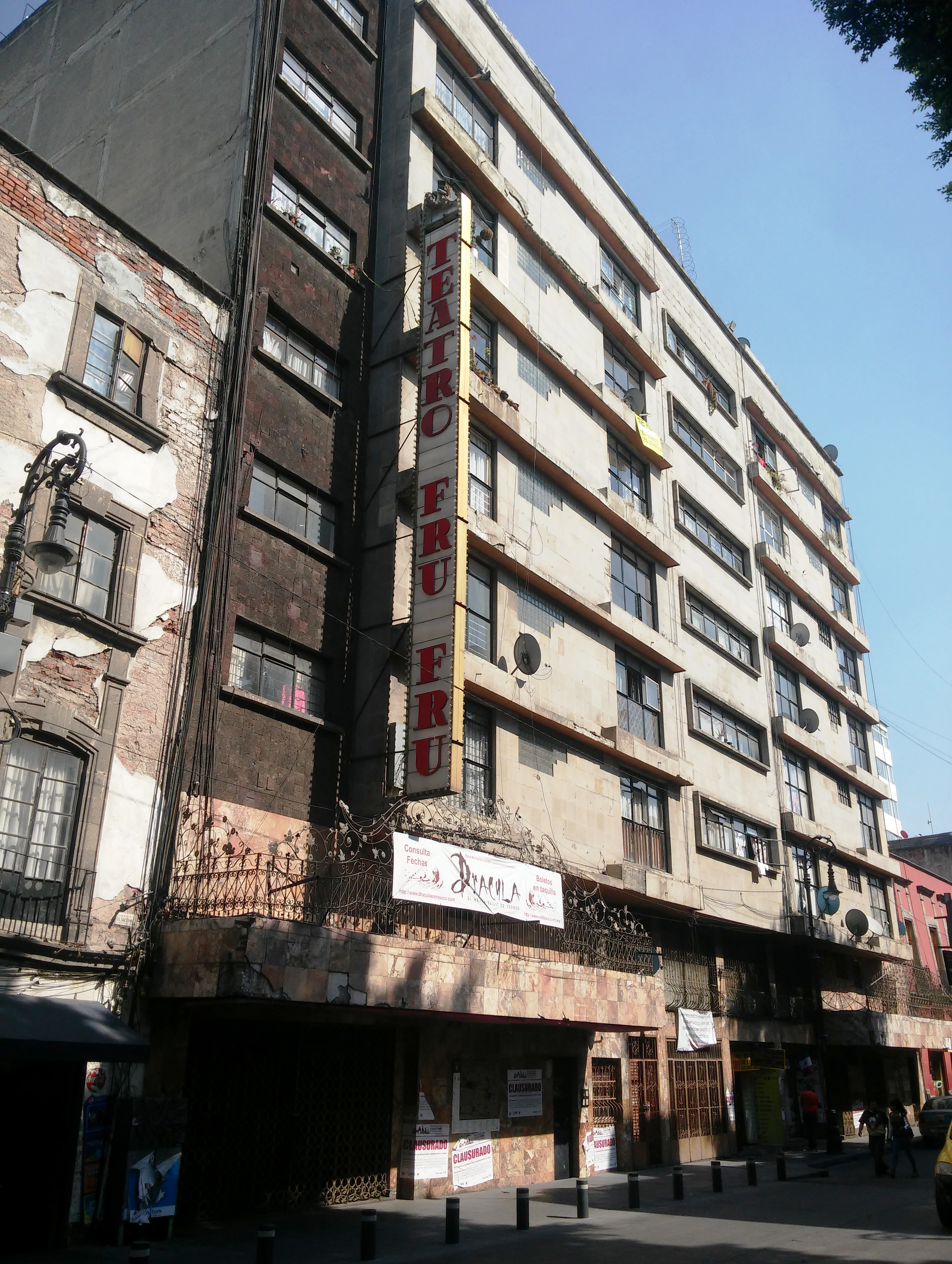
- Former names: Gran Teatro Nacional; Teatro Renacimiento; Teatro Virginia Fábregas; Teatro Mexicano

General information
- Architectural style: Second Empire architecture Napoleon III style (interior)
- Location: Donceles Street # 24, Centro Histórico de la Ciudad de México
- Coordinates: 19.4369°N 99.1387°W
- Construction started: 1 Jan 1899
- Inaugurated: 1899
- Renovated: 1973
- Owner: Irma Serrano

The Teatro Fru Fru (Fru Fru Theater) is a theater in Mexico City. It was inaugurated on January 1, 1899 under the name Teatro Renacimiento. In 1973 it was re-inaugurated with its current name. It is located at number 24 in the Donceles Street, in the Centro Histórico de la Ciudad de México

== History ==
In the place where the theater is located was originally located the Gran Teatro Nacional. When it was demolished, the Teatro Renacimiento was built in its place. The theater was inaugurated on January 1, 1899. It is said that the inauguration was attended by the then President of Mexico Porfirio Díaz. But in 1906, the theater is acquired by businessman Francisco Cardona, who decides to rename it with the name of his wife, legendary Mexican actress and theater entrepreneur Virginia Fábregas. At that time was a novelty, since it was the first theater in the Mexican capital to own electric lighting. The theater lived a period of splendor at the beginning of the century. But in 1933, the theater began to lose its splendor and changed its name to Teatro Mexicano. However, due to unknown issues, the theater remained closed for several years and was about to be demolished.

In 1973, the theater was acquired and remodeled by Mexican actress and singer Irma Serrano La Tigresa. The actress claims to have acquired the property at an auction of the cement company Anahuac. With an important investment, Serrano reactive the theater baptizing it with the present name. The theater was inaugurated with the controversial theatrical assembly Naná, based on the homonymous novel of Emile Zola, and produced and carried out by Serrano. The work remained on the billboard with great success for a couple of years.

From that moment, the theater becomes the forum for a series of controversial works produced and some also starring by La Tigresa. Among them stand out montages like Lucrecia Borgia (1977) or Yocasta Reina (1978), among others.

In the early 1980s, the theater introduced the concept known as Midnight Theater, created by producer and director Pablo Leder, which was based on works aimed at a strictly adult audience. This situation gave the theater a reputation of controversial and transgressor, although the theatrical montages stood out by a great quality in production.

At the end of 1980s, the theater gradually stopped performing plays. During 1990s, the venue opened its doors for certain seasons as a night club. In 2003, the theater reopens its doors to being rented by Serrano to the entrepreneur Enrique Vidal.

However, after a series of conflicts, the enclosure closed its doors for the second time.

Since then, the venue has reopened its doors for theatrical productions sporadically. In recent times the venue has also served as a space for musical events by bands and artists such as Victimas del Doctor Cerebro, Natalia Lafourcade. Gang Gang Dance and The Dresden Dolls.

Due to its history and peculiar decorative style, the Teatro Fru Fru has also served as a space for the recording of music videos and films both national and foreign. Among them are Cantinflas (2014) by Sebastián del Amo, Spectre (2015), by Sam Mendes and Omen by English duo Disclosure.

== Legends ==
- In one of the galleries of the precinct existed in the years 1970's and 1980's a cabaret known as La Cueva de La Tigresa, famous for its daring burlesque shows.
- In the lobby there is a statue of what appears to be a demon carrying a small tray. According to tradition, the actors must leave some candy as an offering so that their plays won't fail.
- Due to its antiquity, peculiar architecture, decoration and the controversial personality of Irma Serrano, its owner, the theater has been the subject of numerous legends and myths that relate paranormal events inside its doors.

== See also ==
- Teatro de la Ciudad
