= Marisol (Mexican TV series) =

- Genre: Telenovela; Romance; Drama
- Created by: Inés Rodena
- Written by: Marcia del Río; Alberto Gómez; Valeria Phillips; Enrique Torres; José Nicolás; Alberto Aridjis; Rosario Velicia
- Directed by: Julián Pastor; Antulio Jiménez Pons; Germán Robles; Jaime Vega
- Starring: Erika Buenfil; Eduardo Santamarina; Claudia Islas; Enrique Álvarez Félix; Aarón Hernán; Emma Laura; David Ostrosky
- Theme music composer: Enrique Iglesias; Roberto Morales
- Opening theme: "Por Amarte" by Enrique Iglesias
- Country of origin: Mexico
- Original language: Spanish
- No. of episodes: 145

Production
- Executive producer: Juan Osorio
- Producers: José Ambris; Pablo Noceda Pérez
- Production locations: Filming; Televisa San Ángel; Mexico City, Mexico; Locations; Mexico City, D.F., Mexico; Monterrey, Mexico; San Miguel de Allende, Mexico; Houston, Texas, U.S.
- Cinematography: Gilberto Macín; Ernesto Arreola; Pablo Noceda Pérez; Antulio Jiménez Pons
- Running time: 41-44 minutes
- Production company: Televisa

Original release
- Network: Canal de las Estrellas
- Release: January 22 – August 9, 1996

Related
- Marcha nupcial (1977–1978); Los ricos también lloran (1979–1980); Marisol (2002)

Marisol (Spanish pronunciation: [maɾiˈsol]) is a Mexican telenovela produced by Juan Osorio for Televisa in 1996. Telenovela is a remake of the 1977 Mexican telenovela Marcha nupcial. Famous and beloved Enrique Álvarez Félix died after he finished his work in Marisol.

Erika Buenfil and Eduardo Santamarina starred as protagonists, while Claudia Islas, Enrique Álvarez Félix, Emma Laura, Renée Varsi, Sergio Basañez and Pilar Montenegro starred as antagonists.

== Plot ==
Marisol has a pain-ridden life. She has a disfiguring scar on her face from a piece of a broken mirror she had fallen on when she was a little girl. Her mother is dying and Marisol must sell paper flowers to make money in order to support herself and her mother.

Sofia, Marisol's mother, is carrying a heavy secret and she realizes she must tell Marisol the truth before she dies and leaves her alone (especially with Marisol's sleazy boyfriend Mario).

Unfortunately, Sofia dies without revealing that Marisol is really the granddaughter of Don Alonso Garcés del Valle, who is the patriarch of a very rich family. His grandson may be the handsome and amiable painter, José Andrés, whose true identity is unknown.

To complicate matters, José Andrés and Marisol fall in love with each other while engaged to other people, while both completely in the dark about their true identities.

== Cast ==
- Erika Buenfil as Marisol Ledesma Garcés del Valle, in love with José Andrés
- Eduardo Santamarina as José Andrés Garcés del Valle López, in love with Marisol
- Claudia Islas as Amparo López de Garcés del Valle, José Andrés' mother
- Enrique Álvarez Félix as Leonardo Garcés del Valle, José Andrés' father.
- Aarón Hernán as Don Alonso Garcés del Valle, Marisol's grandfather
- Emma Laura as Rosana Valverde, José Andrés's wife
- David Ostrosky as Mariano Ruiz, José Andrés' biological father
- Pilar Montenegro as Sulema Chávez
- Sergio Basañez as Mario Suárez Maldonado
- Alejandro Ibarra as Francisco "Paco" Suárez Maldonado
- Socorro Bonilla as Doña Rosita Maldonado de Suárez
- Romina Castro as Mimí Candela de Suárez, Marisol's best friend
- Germán Robles as Basilio González
- Verónica Langer as Carmen López de Pedroza, Sister of Amparo
- Paulina Lazareno as Alejandra Pedroza López Daughter of Carmen, Marisol's cousin
- Irma Lozano as Sofía Garcés del Valle de Ledesma, Mother of Marisol
- Alberto Insua as Alfredo Ledesma, Father of Marisol
- Julia Marichal as Dolores
- Alberto Mayagoitía as Rubén Linares
- Ivette as Camila Linares
- José María Torre as Daniel "Danny" Linares
- Guillermo Murray as Dr. Álvaro Linares
- Ana María Aguirre as Rebeca
- Alejandra Procuna as Malú
- Amparo Garrido as Constanza
- Blanca Torres as Blanca
- Laura Flores as Sandra Luján
- Christian Ruiz as José María Garcés del Valle "Chema"
- Renée Varsi as Vanessa Garcés del Valle
- Raymundo Capetillo as Diego Montalvo
- Maricarmen Vela as Doña Andrea de Montalvo
- Guillermo García Cantú as Raúl Montemar
- Teresa Tuccio as Sabrina Montemar
- Jair de Rubin as Daniel Martínez "El Chupacabras"
- Anastasia as Yolanda "Yoli"
- Alejandra Meyer as Doña Lorenza
- Guillermo Rivas as Don Tomás
- Lucía Guilmáin as Romualda Martínez
- Cocó Ortiz as Raymunda Martínez
- Yadira Santana as Mariana
- Laura Forastieri as Wilma
- Chao as Óscar
- Oscar Márquez as Leonel Villanueva
- Grelda Cobo as Angélica
- Antonio De Carlo as Rosendo
- Serrana as Teresa
- Nikky as Jesús
- Guadalupe Bolaños as Dorina Capucci
- Marcos Valdés as Dr. Salvador Saldívar
- Francisco Xavier as Alberto Montiel
- Alma Rosa Añorve as Déborah de Valverde
- Teo Tapia as Rodolfo Valverde
- Montalvo "El Pirata de la Salsa" as Lalo
- Carolina Guerrero as Lola
- Rodolfo Arias as Nicolás Mijares
- Michaelle Mayer as Rosario "Chayito"
- Nora Velázquez as Petra
- Luhana as Chole
- Verónika con K. as Zalmudia
- Lilian Tapia as Gelatina
- Sherlyn González as Sofía Garcés del Valle "Piojito"
- Antonio Escobar as Larry García
- Raúl Askenazi as Teniente Romero
- Rafael Perrin as Detective Aguilar
- Miguel Ángel Fuentes as Pulga
- Miguel Garza as Piojo
- Raúl Valerio as Dr. Heredia
- Víctor Lozada as Toto
- Abigail Martínez as Genoveva
- Jorge Santos as Dr. Samuel Reyna
- Nando Estevané as Silvano Suárez
- Brenda Zachas as Acasia
- Alfredo Rosas as Cástulo
- Marco Antonio Calvillo as Omar
- Flor Payan as Esmeralda "Melita"
- Nieves Mogas as Herlinda
- Soraya as Guadalupe
- María Prado as Doña Chancla
- Fernando Lozano as Sebastián
- Adriana Chapela as Clara
- Judith Grace as Carola
- Emmanuel Ortiz as Claudio
- Nancy Curiel as Carmín
- Jesús Ochoa as Don Fortunato
- Maunel Ávila Córdoba as Dr. Santos
- Manuel Benítez as Μr. Morales
- José Luis Avendaño as Serafín
- Alicia del Lago as Cleotilde
- Abril Campillo as Teófila Vda. de Gamboa
- Héctor Fuentes León as Julián
- María Marmolejo as Altagracia #1
- Mariana Rivera as Altagracia #2
- Jamye Post as Heidi
- Bernhard Seifert as Hans
- Alberto Seeman as Dr. Silva
- Fernando Sarfati as Lic. Cabrera
- Ofelia Guilmáin as Zamira
- Gabriela Salomón as Domitila
- Miguel Serros as Ballesteros
- Alejandro Ávila as Castello
- Mario Suárez as Quijano
- Ángeles Balvanera as Lola
- Silvia Ramírez as Sonia
- Martín Rojas as Manolo
- Héctor Álvarez as Dr. García
- Raúl Castellanos as Child
- Víctor Foulloms as Joyero
- Gustavo Zárate as Dueño
- Néstor Leoncio as Man
- Ely Mauri as Police
- Omar Germenos as Medical
- Alberto Langer as Journalist
- Roberto Porter as Priest
- Monique Rojkind as Nurse
- Dolores Salomón "Bodokito" as Mrs. Gordoa
- Arturo Peniche as Juan Vicente Morelos
- Radamés de Jesús as Tootie
- Verónica Gallardo as Herself
- Enrique Iglesias as Himself
- Ángeles Yáñez

== Awards ==
Year	Award	Category	Nominee	Result
1997	15th TVyNovelas Awards	Best Actress	Erika Buenfil	Nominated
1997	15th TVyNovelas Awards	Best Actor	Eduardo Santamarina	Nominated
