= Lo que el cielo no perdona =

Mexican telenovela

- Genre: Telenovela
- Created by: Alfonso Cremata; Salvador Ugarte
- Written by: Estela Calderón
- Directed by: Julio Castillo
- Starring: Enrique Álvarez Félix; Blanca Guerra; Luis Mario Quiroz; Mónica Prado; Rosa María Moreno; Xavier Marc
- Country of origin: Mexico
- Original language: Spanish
- No. of episodes: 100

Production
- Executive producer: Fernando Chacón
- Production locations: Mexico City, Mexico
- Running time: 21-22 minutes

Original release
- Network: Canal de las Estrellas
- Release: 1982

Lo que el cielo no perdona (English title: What heaven will not forgive) is a Mexican telenovela produced by Fernando Chacón for Canal de las Estrellas in 1982. It starred by Blanca Guerra, Enrique Álvarez Félix, Mónica Prado, Rosa María Moreno and the child Luis Mario Quiroz.

== Plot ==
Toño is a nice boy orphan who, along with his faithful dog Simon decides to travel to the big city, then discovers that his real father lives there, so it's really not an orphan. Discover this is a very rich man but he's really sick. Wicked relatives know that the child will inherit all when the father dies, so to get to the house of his father treat them badly and posing as the son of the maid, but at all costs want rid of it. But Toño find support and affection in Elizabeth, a young woman who cares for and protects like his own son.

Marcelo is a man who also mistreated the child, but to fall in love with Isabel changes and becomes attached to the child. The father dies and Marcelo learns that relatives want to kidnap the child. There he defends and takes it out of the house, but this causes Marcelo is kidnapped and ends up dead. Toño flee with Isabel and Simon but after so many misfortunes finally recover what belongs.

== Cast ==
- Enrique Álvarez Félix as Marcelo
- Blanca Guerra as Isabel
- Luis Mario Quiroz as Toño
- Mónica Prado as Martha
- Rosa María Moreno as Serafina
- Xavier Marc as Gerardo
- Ana Silvia Garza as Bárbara
- Sara Guasch as Prudencia
- Patricia Montero as Leonor
- Adriana Parra as Teodosia
- Merle Uribe as Rebeca
- Alberto Sayán as Luis Alvarado
- Queta Carrasco as Milagros
- Oscar Traven as Reynaldo
- Margot Wagner as Remedios
- Carlos Riquelme as Don Andrés
