= Paloma (TV series) =

- Genre: Telenovela
- Created by: Marissa Garrido
- Starring: Ofelia Medina; Andrés García
- Opening theme: "Cada mañana que te vas" by José José
- Country of origin: Mexico
- Original language: Spanish

Production
- Executive producers: Alfredo Saldaña; Ernesto Alonso
- Cinematography: Alfredo Saldaña

Original release
- Network: Televisión Independiente de México
- Release: 1975

Paloma is a Mexican telenovela produced by Alfredo Saldaña and Ernesto Alonso for Televisión Independiente de México in 1975.

== Cast ==
- Ofelia Medina as Paloma
- Antonio Passy as Sarabia
- Rita Macedo as Teresa
- Andrés García as Daniel
- Aarón Hernán as Gustavo
- July Furlong as Isabel
- Tere Velázquez as Eugenia
- Frank Moro as Raul
- Carmen Montejo as Gloria
- Héctor Bonilla as Alejandro
- Enrique Novi as Gabriel
- Anel as Margo
- Juan Pelaez as Eladio
- Lina Michel as Michel
- Lucía Méndez as Rosa
- Lupita D'Alessi as Dora Luz
- Bertha Moss as Catalina
- Ariadne Welter as Mina Ballesteros
- Oscar Morelli as Lic. Gil
