= Enrique Álvarez Félix =

Mexican actor

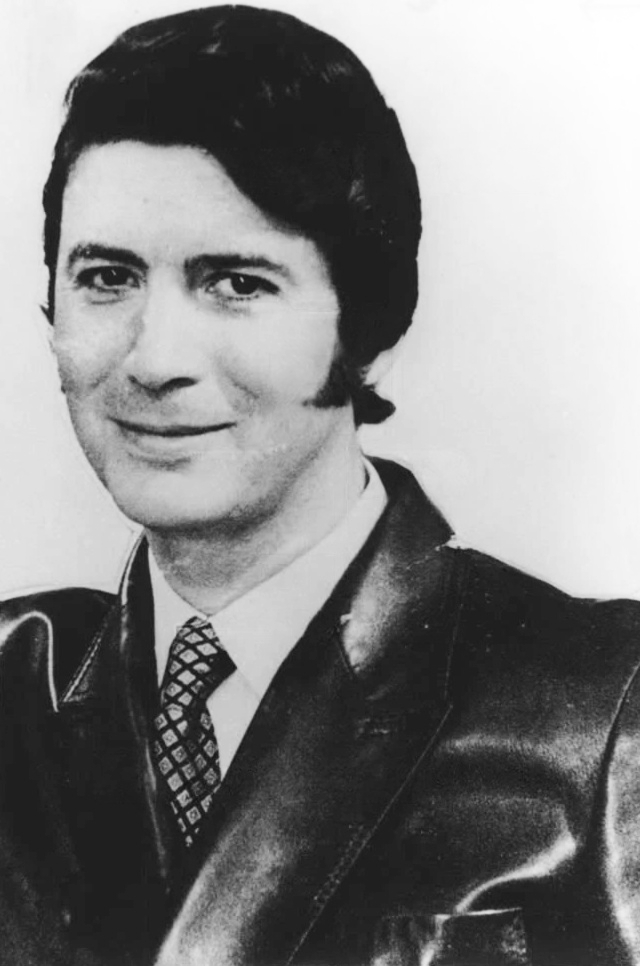
- Enrique Álvarez Félix in 1977
- Born: 5 April 1935; Guadalajara, Jalisco, Mexico
- Died: 24 May 1996 (aged 61); Mexico City, Mexico
- Occupation: Actor
- Years active: 1955–1996
- Parent(s): María Félix; Enrique Álvarez Alatorre

Enrique Álvarez Félix (5 April 1935 – 24 May 1996) was a Mexican actor.

== Early life ==
Enrique Álvarez Félix was the only son of Mexican actress María Félix and her first husband, Enrique Álvarez Alatorre. When his parents divorced in 1938, his mother lived for a time at home with her own parents until 1939, when she traveled with Enrique to Mexico City. Soon after, her ex-husband took Álvarez Félix.

== Career ==
He was known for his roles in telenovelas and in films, such as The Monastery of the Vultures and The House of the Pelican.

Álvarez's last acting role was "Leonardo" in Marisol (1996). The title character, Leonardo's niece, was played by Erika Buenfil; Leonardo's wife, Ámparo, was played by Claudia Islas. He died two days after the episode in which his character, Leonardo, was killed off.

== Personal life and death ==
Álvarez Félix never married, and, according to Mexican novelist and essayist Carlos Fuentes, he was sexually frustrated, and had an Oedipus complex.

Enrique Álvarez Félix died from a heart attack in the early morning of Friday, May 24, 1996, aged 61.

== Selected filmography ==
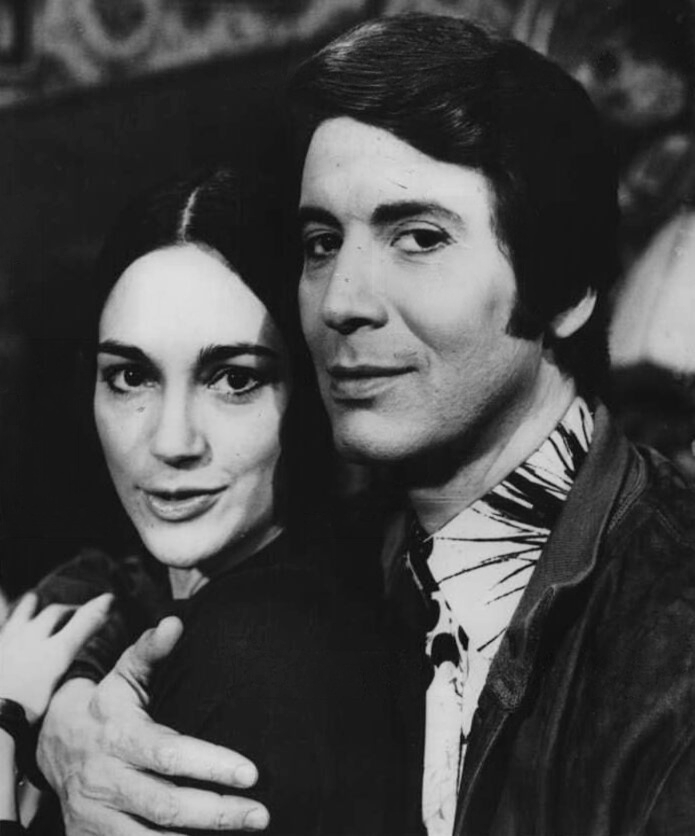
Ofelia Medina and Enrique Álvarez Félix in Rina (1977)

=== Film ===
- The Immortal Charro (1955)
- Simon of the Desert (1964)
- The Crows are in Mourning (1965)
- The Two Elenas (1965)
- House of Women (1966)
- Requiem for a scoundrel (1966)
- The riders of the witch (1966)
- The Outsiders (Los Caifanes) (1966)
- The Green Years (1966)
- Three nights of madness (1968)
- Chronicle of a coward (1968)
- Trap for a cadaver (1969)
- Narda or summer (1970)
- The Angels of the Afternoon (1970)
- The spring of the scorpions (1971)
- Victoria (1972)
- The disturbed (1972)
- The Monastery of the Vultures (1973)
- Love does not have a woman's face (1973)
- Labyrinth of passions (1975)
- The House of the Pelican (1978)

=== Television ===
- The Golden Woman (1964)
- House of neighborhood (1964)
- Valeria (1965)
- Soul of my soul (1965)
- Wild Heart (1966)
- Between shadows (1967)
- Scam of love (1968)
- The portrait of de Dorian Gray (1969)
- I know never (1970)
- The constitution (1970)
- The twins (1972)
- The carriage (1972)
- The building opposite (1972)
- My rival (1973)
- Doll (1974)
- The spring of the miracle (1974)
- The unforgivable (1975-1976)
- Rina (1977)
- The Sin of love (1978-1979)
- Colorina (1980-1981)
- What the sky does not forgive (1982)
- You are my destiny (1984)
- Thoroughbred (1985-1986)
- As we are (1987-1988)
- Light and shadow (1989)
- The Devil's smile (1992)
- Marisol (1996)

== Family tree ==
Josefina Güereña Rosas de Félix
María de los Ángeles Félix Güereña (1914 – 2002)
Bernardo Félix Flores
Enrique Álvarez Félix (1935 – 1996)
Enrique Álvarez Alatorre
