= Telenorte Antofagasta =

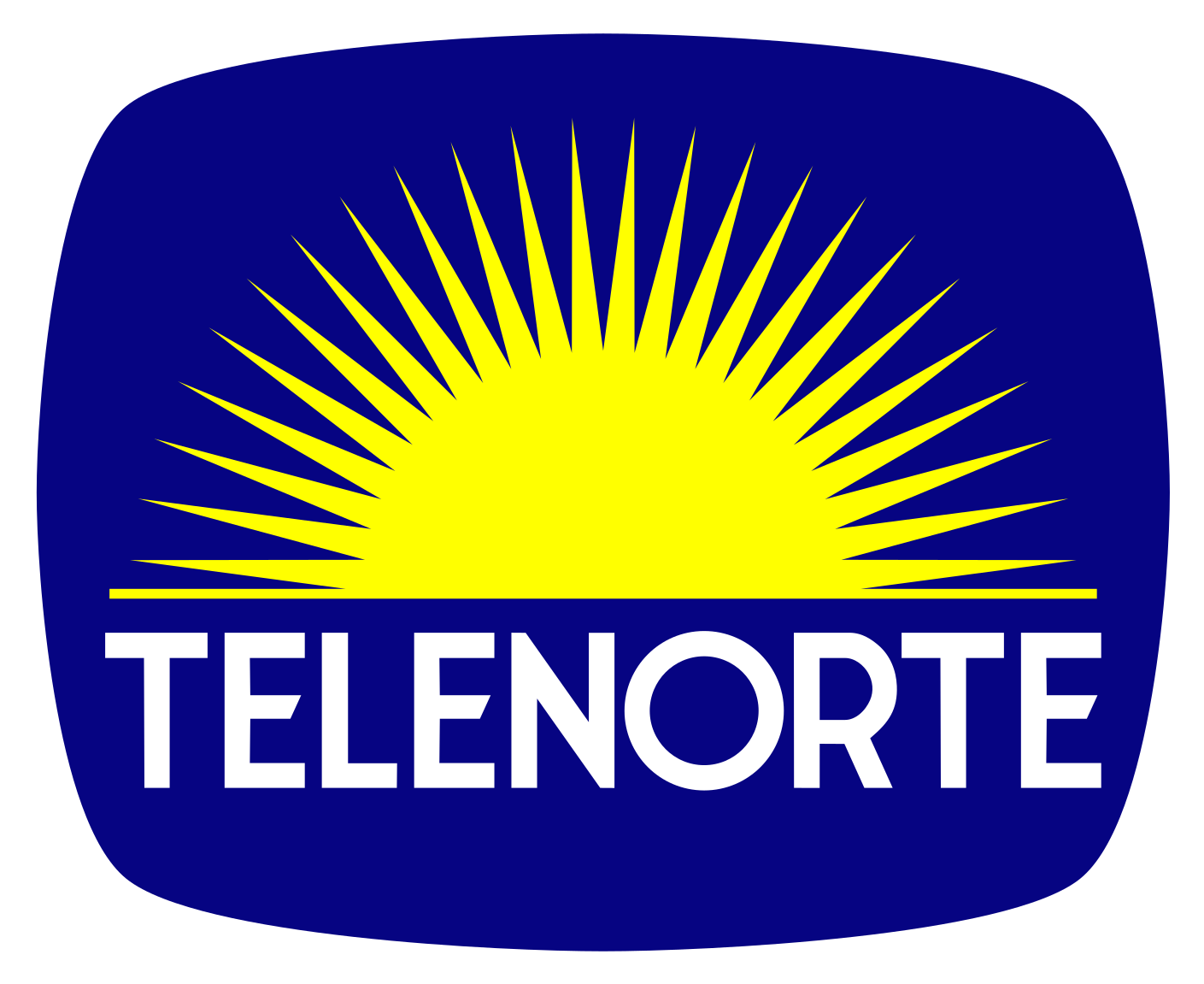

Ownership
- Owner: Catholic University of the North (1966–1994); Radio Chilena (1994–1997)

History
- Launched: November 11, 1966
- Closed: January 16, 1998

Availability

Terrestrial
- Analog (Antofagasta): 3

Telenorte Antofagasta (channel 3) was a Chilean television station licensed to Antofagasta and was a part of Telenorte. It started broadcasting in 1966, but briefly went silent beginning in 1969 with the installation of a TVN station (on channel 6). It resumed in 1973, subsequently becoming the main station of the TVUN/Telenorte network, and shut down in 1998, after its privatization by Radio Chilena, becoming a relay of the Arica station until the network closed in 2001.

== History ==
=== Background ===
The first event related to the idea of bringing television to Antofagasta emerged in July 1964, when Eduardo Tironi, director of Canal 13 (from Santiago), highlighted to the local press —after a visit to Antofagasta that began on July 3— a plan to install a local television station to be owned by the University of the North, with an affiliation to the network of the Catholic University of Chile. The initial plan outlined twenty hours of programming per week, in an equal 50–50 split between programs produced by Canal 13 and local programming, and a cost of approximately US$60,000. In April 1965, the university received a permit to conduct test broadcasts for an upcoming television station, while in September 1966, there were rumors regarding the installation of a television station in Arica operated by the Ministry of Education alongside Junta de Adelanto de Arica, which ultimately never materialized.

Antofagasta could have waited over one year for the plan to come true, as Canal 3's experimental broadcasts started on November 11, 1966, and such inaugural broadcast featured the participation of then-University of the North principal Carlos Aldunate Lyon, writers Andrés Sabella, Marta Blanco and María Elena Gertner, and sports commentator Julio Martínez, the last of which appearing through a pre-recorded program from Canal 13.

=== Early years (1967–1969) ===
On March 18, 1967, after its test broadcasts, Canal 3 began its regular broadcasts at 8:55pm in an act which featured the presence of Domingo Santa María Santa Cruz, ministry of economics under Eduardo Frei Montalva's government, and the manager of the Service of Technical Cooperation, Pedro Felipe Ramírez; the station, which already had a videotape machine, was controlled by religious woman Elsa Abud, as well as tech engineers Carlos Rojas Martorell and Raúl Vitalic.

As a result of an agreement with the Ministry of Education, it was established that Canal 3 should serve as basis for the human resources that would form the state television channel, which was still a project at the time. This caused several advisers of Eduardo Frei Montalva's government, such as Rodolfo Tosto, Enrique Motto and Juan Ángel Torti, to be in charge of the station's programming, forbidding the entrance of media students of the University of the North —who were making some of the programs—; such situation caused the occupation of the station's facilities by its students on October 2, 1967.

Canal 3's broadcasts were suspended in April 1969, due to an agreement with the nascent Televisión Nacional de Chile (TVN), which arrived to the city in July that year. TVN started broadcasting locally on July 15, 1969, from studios located in the former Colegio San José boarding school, becoming the regional flagship of Red Norte de Televisión Nacional de Chile in July 1970, covering Tarapacá, Antofagasta and Atacama provinces with delayed programming coming from Santiago, as well as a local news service.

=== Resumption and expansion (1973–1982) ===
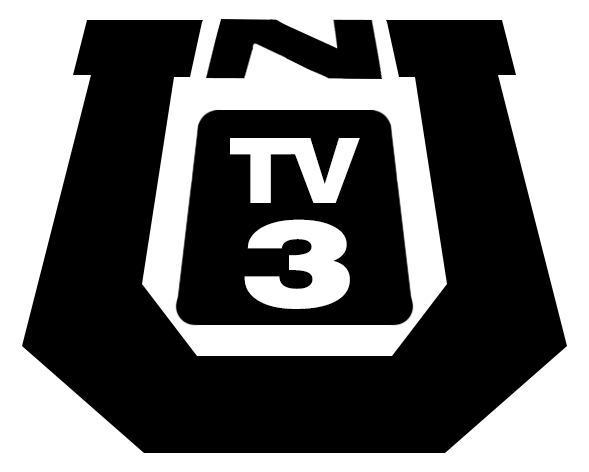
Canal 3 logo (1973–1977)

Canal 3 de Antofagasta resumed broadcasting on February 14, 1973, during the celebrations of the anniversary of the Chilean takeover of Antofagasta. At the time, its studios were located at Pavillion B of the central house of the University of the North, next to its library, whereas the station consisted of 16 staff, among them electronic technician Carlos Rojas Martorell (who became the station's director), Héctor Giaconi (chief engineer), Luis Imerio Guardia (head of production) and Jaime Álvarez (director of communications), whereas Verónica Baeza (at the time a Physical Education student) and Juan Carlos Hernández were its first on-screen announcers. The technical equipment consisted of two blind television cameras (without a visor, which required an external monitor to view the images), a transmitter which took the signal to Cerro Moreno, a 16 mm telecine machine, a lighting equipment, and a control room with a direction, camera control and audio table. Most of its programming was acquired, consisting of TV series and cartoons obtained from Protab.

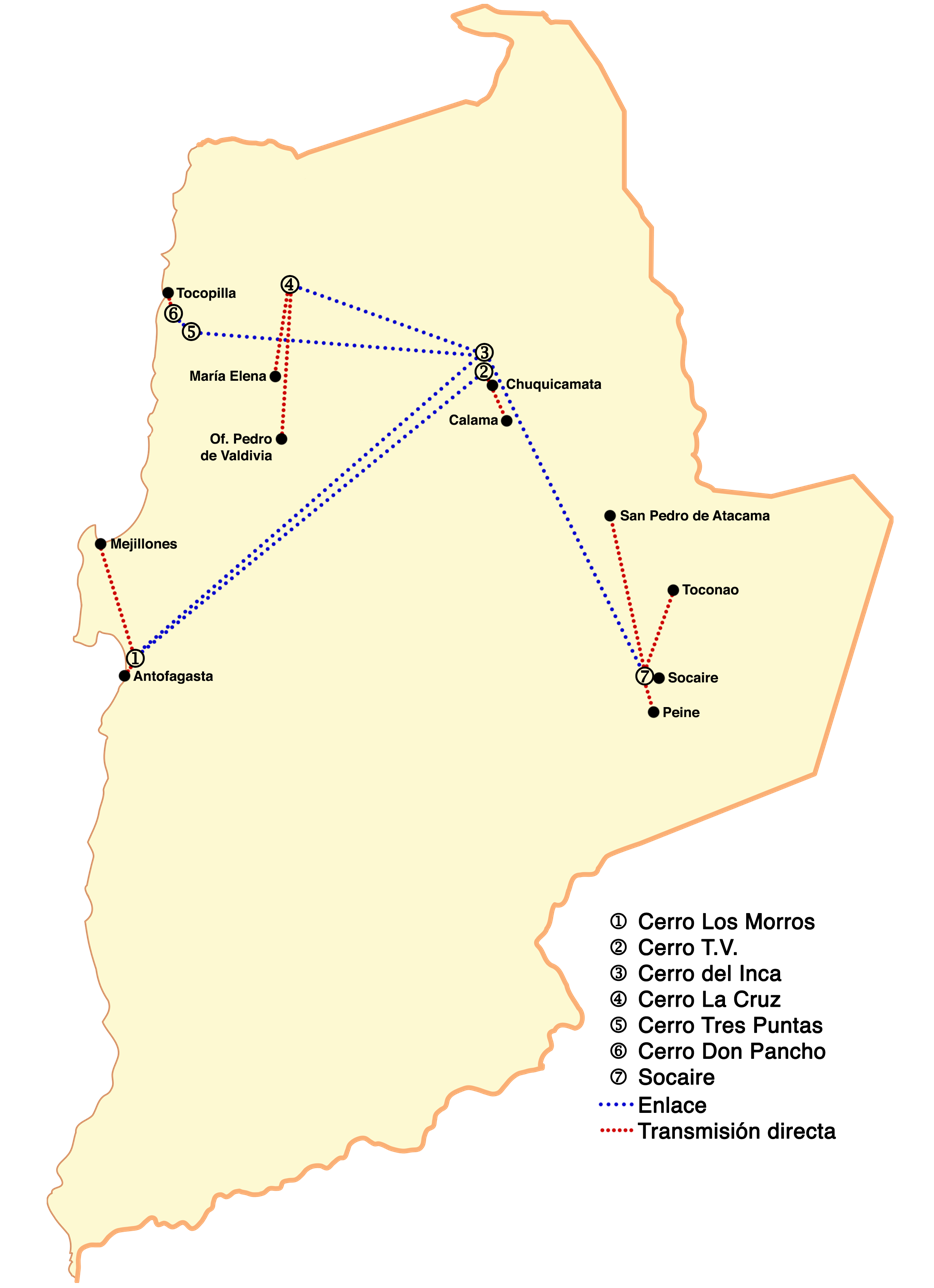
Diagram (in Spanish) showing the expansion plan for Canal 3, developed in 1976.

The regional network (named «Red Norte de Televisión») was created in May 1977 —just a few months earlier, in December 1976, it had signed a relay agreement with Canal 13 to air its programs on a one-week delay in the case of Antofagasta — and one of its first successes was the broadcast of the first Teletón in 1978, which it aired entirely in color. On April 14, 1978, channel 3 of Antofagasta and 8 of Calama and Chuquicamata started airing the first four programs in color: Nocaut (boxing), Toqui (educational), El Fantástico Mundo del Deporte and Show Musical.

Canal 3 Antofagasta's signal expansion was planned in 1976 and started relaying its signal to Calama and Chuquicamata through channel 8 on January 9, 1977, and later to María Elena and Pedro de Valdivia in 1979 after test broadcasts which began in December 1978 —initially on channel 9 and later moving to channel 5—. Canal 3 Antofagasta recorded Cobreloa's soccer matches using a color camera sent by Codelco to the station.

=== Telenorte (1982–1998) ===
Telenorte Antofagasta expanded to Tocopilla on September 9, 1983, on channel 8, while in May 1984, its signal arrived to San Pedro de Atacama and Ollagüe (channel 12).

Telenorte Antofagasta shut down on January 16, 1998; three days after the station's headquarters shut down; the company changed its name from "Red de Televisión Universidad del Norte S.A." to simply "Telenorte S.A.", such act later caused the sale of the station's studios at Carrera 1625.
