= Colorina (disambiguation) =

Colorina is a comune (municipality) in the Province of Sondrio in the Italian region Lombardy.

It may also refer to:

- Colorina (Peruvian TV series), aired from 2017-present
- Colorina (Mexican TV series), aired from 1980 to 1981

== See also ==
- La Colorina, Chilean telenovela aired in 1977
