= Telenorte =

Chilean television channel

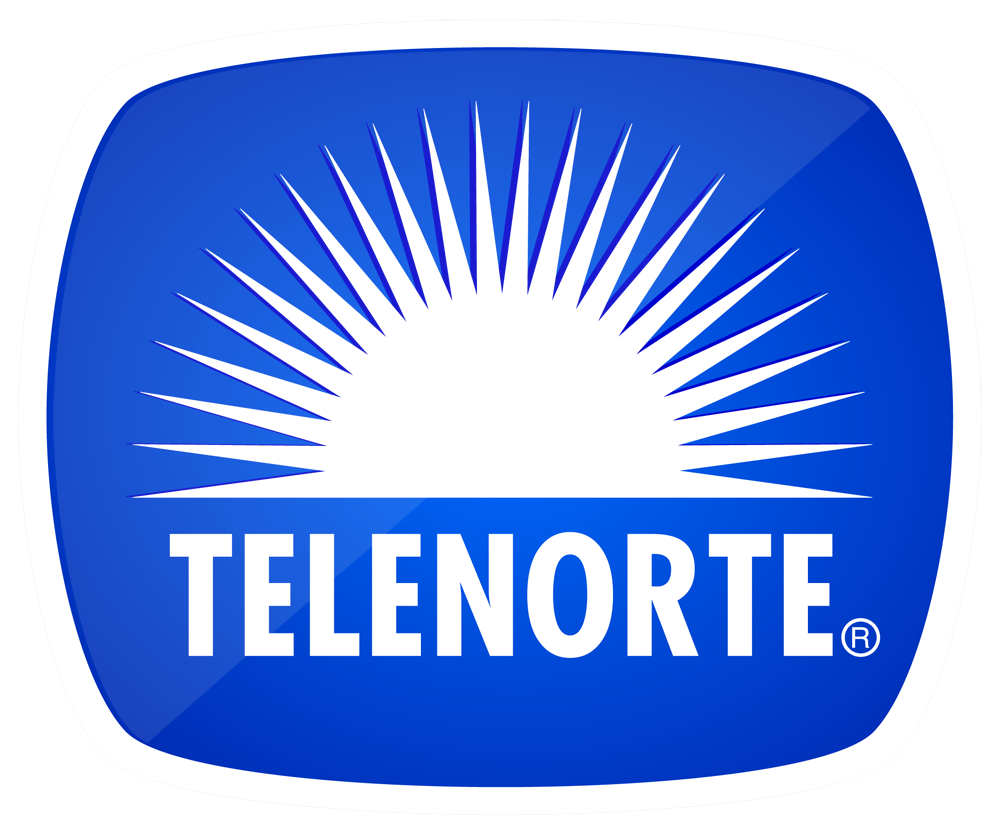

Ownership
- Owner: Universidad Católica del Norte (1966-1995); Radio Chilena (1995-2001)

History
- Launched: November 11, 1966 (original); 2019 (streaming)
- Closed: October 31, 2001 (original)

Links
- Website: https://www.telenorte.cl

Availability

Terrestrial
- Analog (Arica): 11
- Analog (Iquique): 12
- Analog (Antofagasta): 4
- Analog (La Serena): 5

Telenorte is a Chilean Television brand, launched as a TV network in 1966, closed in 2001 and relaunched through streaming since the 2010s, commencing experimental broadcasts in March 2019 under F2 Comunicaciones, which continued until late 2021. The network had stations in Arica, Iquique, Antofagasta and La Serena.

It began under the initiative of the Catholic University of the North in 1966 with Canal 3 Antofagasta, whose broadcasts were suspended from 1969 to 1973 due to the launch of TVN (channel 6) in the city. A few years after resuming telecasts on the same frequency, it started broadcsting to Arica and Iquique in 1976, forming a regional network in 1977 (Red de Televisión Universitaria del Norte (TVUN), following the signing of a programming agreement with Canal 13. In 1982, the network adopted the Telenorte branding and withdrew its contract with the network in 1989, when it established its own transmitters in northern Chile. In 1992, it opened a fourth station in La Serena, then, in 1994, it was privatized to Radio Chilena. The network faced a crisis and shut down all of its originating stations outside of Arica in 1998, being responsible for the whole coverage area until its closure in 2001.

Its former frequencies were revoked licenses given back to the Chilean state, after these were lost by Canal Dos S.A., which were used to relay Telecanal from February 2006 to May 4, 2026, when the National Television Council unanimously decided to revoke them.

== History ==
=== Creation, suspension and re-launch (1966-1978) ===
Telenorte emerged in April 1982, when the Radio and Television Network of then University of the North was privatised, although its original name was Educational Network of the University of the North (Red Educativa de la Universidad del Norte), with a single frequency (Channel 3 in Antofagasta) which started in definitive form on 14 February 1973, although experimental transmissions began on November 11, 1966. The premiere broadcast was attended by the then rector of the University of the North, Carlos Aldunate, writers Andrés Sabella, Marta Blanco and María Elena Gertner, and sports commentator Julio Martínez, the latter through a program recorded on Santiago's Canal 13. On March 18, 1967, after its experimental tests, at 20:55, Channel 3 began regular broadcasts with an act that was attended by the Minister of Economy of the Eduardo Frei Montalva administration, Domingo Santa María Santa Cruz. These broadcasts were suspended in April 1969, due to an agreement with the emerging Televisión Nacional de Chile that would arrive in the city in July of that year, which transferred all of Canal 3's equipment and personnel to Televisión Nacional. The transmissions were resumed on February 14, 1973, as part of the celebrations of the anniversary of the Chilean landing on Antofagasta (part of the War of the Pacific).

In the city of Iquique, broadcasts began on May 21, 1976, and in the city of Arica on June 6 of that same year. The regional network was established in May 1977 and its first milestone was to join the transmission of the first Telethon, which aired in full color. It's thought that Iquique's Channel 12 conducted experimental transmissions in color between 1976 and 1977, which were captured by some of the few receivers in color and had a different standard which Chile later adopted. On 14 April 1978, Channel 3 of Antofagasta and Channel 8 of Calama and Chuquicamata began broadcasting their first 4 programs in color: Nocaut (boxing), Toqui (education), El Fantástico Mundo del Deporte and Show Musical.

=== Partnership with Canal 13 (1978-1989) ===
In 1978, the Red de Televisión de la Universidad del Norte (or TVUN, as it was abbreviated back then) became an affiliate of Canal 13 from the Catholic University of Chile. With this partnership, programs produced in Santiago would be broadcast in TVUN. Most programs were tape-delayed, being broadcast in Antofagasta one week after airing in Santiago. However, this was compensated with Canal 13 of Santiago broadcasting live, via microwave, the highest rated programs like Sábado gigante, Martes 13 or sports broadcasts like the World Cup and the Olympic Games, which were previously only tape-delayed. In April 1982, TVUN was renamed to Telenorte (name previously adopted for its newscast).

Telenorte quickly became the alternative source of information and entertainment, with emphasis on regional issues, since it offered programs and local newscasts. Even with the acquisition in the mid-eighties of a truck with a microwave transmission system, they could make local outside broadcasts, such as artistic events and football matches.

The last broadcasting agreement between Telenorte and Santiago's Canal 13 was for the 1988 plebiscite, since the following year the affiliation contract with the Santiago network ended because the latter had contemplated reaching northern cities with its own satellite signal, which was completed in 1989. For example, in Antofagasta, the arrival of Canal 13 took place on July 8, 1989. Despite this, the last program broadcast by both networks was the debate for the 1989 general elections (only in Arica, as Iquique and Antofagasta both had Canal 13 repeaters back then).

=== Work with other channels (1989-1995) ===
Alternatively, Telenorte signed a contract with Channel 11 of the then Television Corporation of the University of Chile (today Chilevisión), also from Santiago, which expired soon. In March 1990, with the signing of the new statutes of the Catholic University of North (Universidad Católica del Norte, UCN), Telenorte became a corporation and its first president was Iván Simunovic.

On March 6, 1991, the National Television Council of Chile authorized Telenorte to start broadcasts in La Serena and Coquimbo, which began on 15 November 1992. In 1991, Telenorte broadcast live matches of the Copa América held in Chile, as part of an alliance with Megavisión (then-recently launched channel 9 in Santiago). Later, at the beginning of 1993, Telenorte made an agreement with La Red to broadcast most of their programs, putting an end to the agreement with Channel 11, since the latter announced its expansion nationwide in mid-1993, a product of the new owners at the time. All this lasted until 1994, when their original signals that came from Santiago arrived in the northern cities. Finally in the same year, Telenorte signed another contract with UCV Televisión and transmitted some of the channel's programs and programs of local production, complemented with certain cultural programs produced by Telemundo and European broadcasters.

In 1995, as the result of a financial crisis, UCN stopped being the majority owner of Telenorte, passing half of its administration to Radio Chilena, which became the new owner of this channel. The new company had developed plans for technical intermediation and also boosting local production through its stations. Following this, its studios and transmissions would be shut down, starting in Iquique, Antofagasta and then finally in La Serena, leaving only its studios in Arica from 1998 to 2001, the year closed the channel.

Arica's signal (VHF Frequency 10) was only for this city, while that of Iquique (VHF Frequency 12) was also for Pozo Almonte, Pica and Camiña (4 VHF frequency). The Antofagasta signal was relayed in Tocopilla, city in which broadcasting began on September 9, 1983. María Elena, Pedro de Valdivia (VHF frequency 5), Calama, Chuquicamata (VHF frequency 8), San Pedro de Atacama, Ollagüe (frequency 12 VHF), which arrived in May 1984, and Copiapó (VHF frequency 5). The sign of La Serena and Coquimbo (VHF frequency 5) was only for these two cities.

Along with the television station, a radio network was inaugurated on FM stations, called Radio Sol FM.

=== Ownership under Radio Chilena and final transmissions (1995-2001) ===
In 1995, Universidad Católica del Norte ceased to be owner and when ownership passed into the hands of Radio Chilena.

The network subtly entered into bankruptcy, closing studios in Iquique in 1996, La Serena in 1997, Antofagasta in 1998. The Arica station closed on October 31, 2001, ending the network.

On December 31, 2001 UCV TV took over Telenorte through renting of their channels, giving the Valparaíso station coverage in northern Chile. However, the signal was shut down in 2005.

That same year, the Telenorte signal was acquired by the company Alfa Tres, owner of Telecanal.

=== Relaunch attempts through streaming (since 2011) ===
In 2011, one of Telenorte's former workers (through a production company he founded) has registered the Telenorte trademark, logo and the website telenorte.cl. Since then, two attempts to relaunch Telenorte have been made. The first one was between 2011 and 2012, which has only progressed into closed-circuit broadcasts in Minera Escondida. The second attempt, since 2019, involved converting Telenorte into a streaming TV channel. The latter attempt became the definitive one. Telenorte officially launched new programs and relaunched some programs, like newscast Norte Noticias, through its website and YouTube, and although the project slowed down due to the COVID-19 pandemic, it hasn't been cancelled as of 2022.

After a pause, in 2023 they resumed broadcasting the signal experimentally, through their web signal, in which they broadcast packaged programming, such as series and movies, similar to other local and regional channels in the country

== Network ==
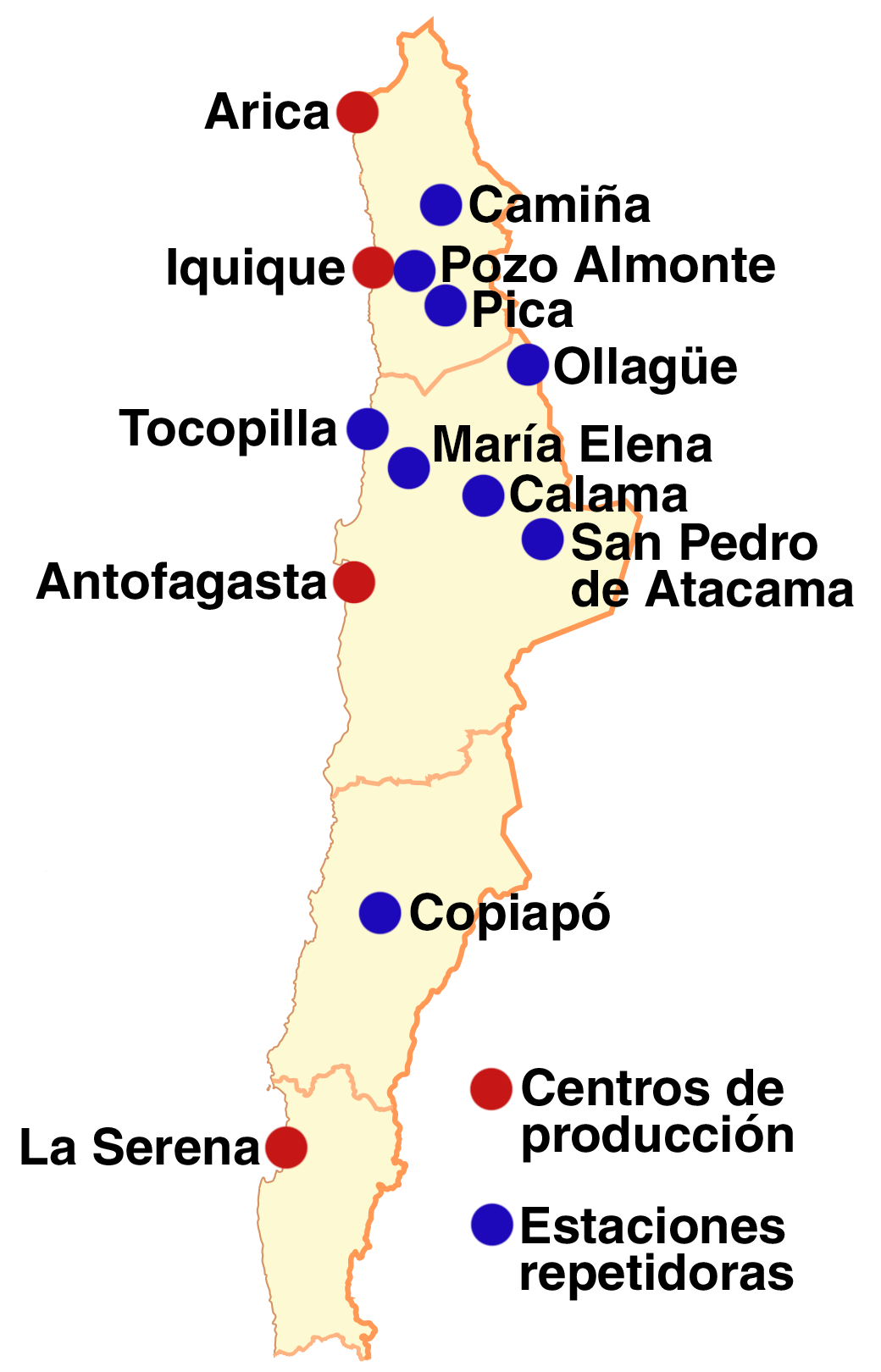
Telenorte's production centers (red) and translator stations (blue) prior to the mid-1990s.

Production center	Channel	Studios	Translators
Telenorte Arica (flagship after 1998)	10 (1976-1982); 11 (1982-2001)	18 de Septiembre 2222 (1976-1979); El Cobre 1262 (1979-1986); Diego Portales 651 (1986-2001)	N/A
Telenorte Iquique	12 (1976-2001)	Wilson 363	Camiña; Pozo Almonte; Pica
Telenorte Antofagasta (flagship until 1998)	3 (1966-1994); 4 (1994-2001)	Carrera 1625	Tocopilla; María Elena; Calama/Chuquicamata; San Pedro de Atacama; Ollagüe; Copiapó
Telenorte La Serena	5 (1992-2001)	Juan Cisternas alt. 2485	N/A

== Logo history ==
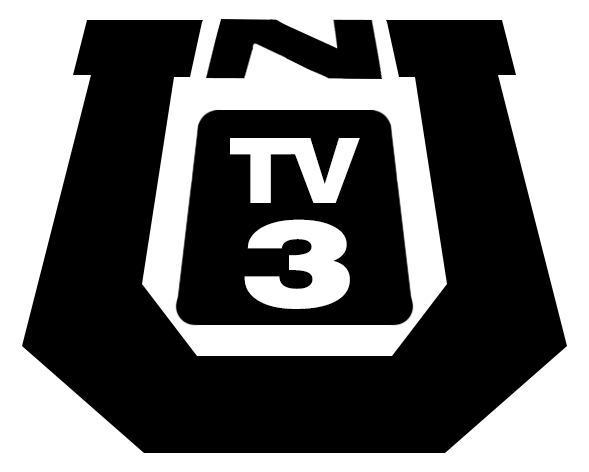
1973-1977 (only used in Antofagasta).

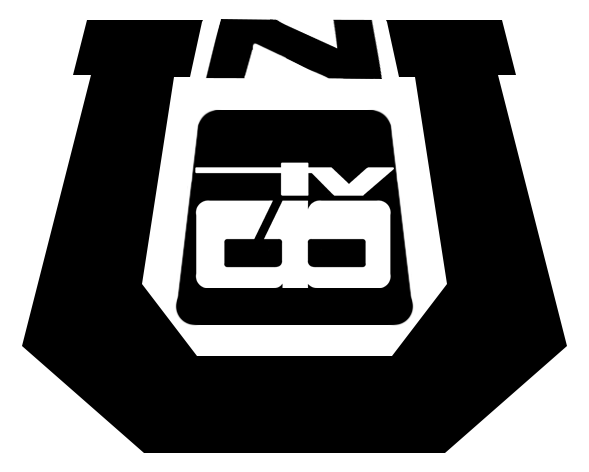
1973-1977 (only used in Arica).

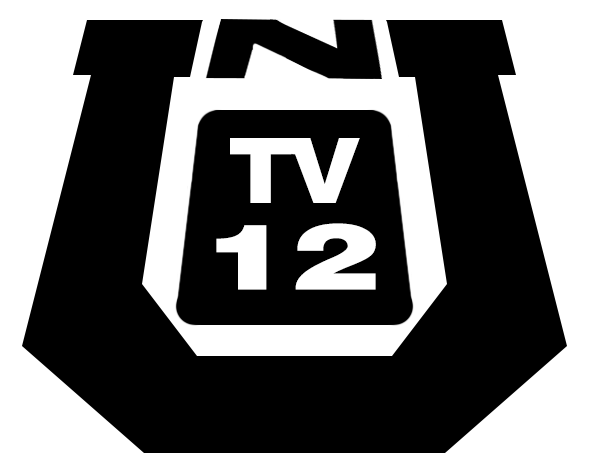
1973-1977 (only used in Iquique).

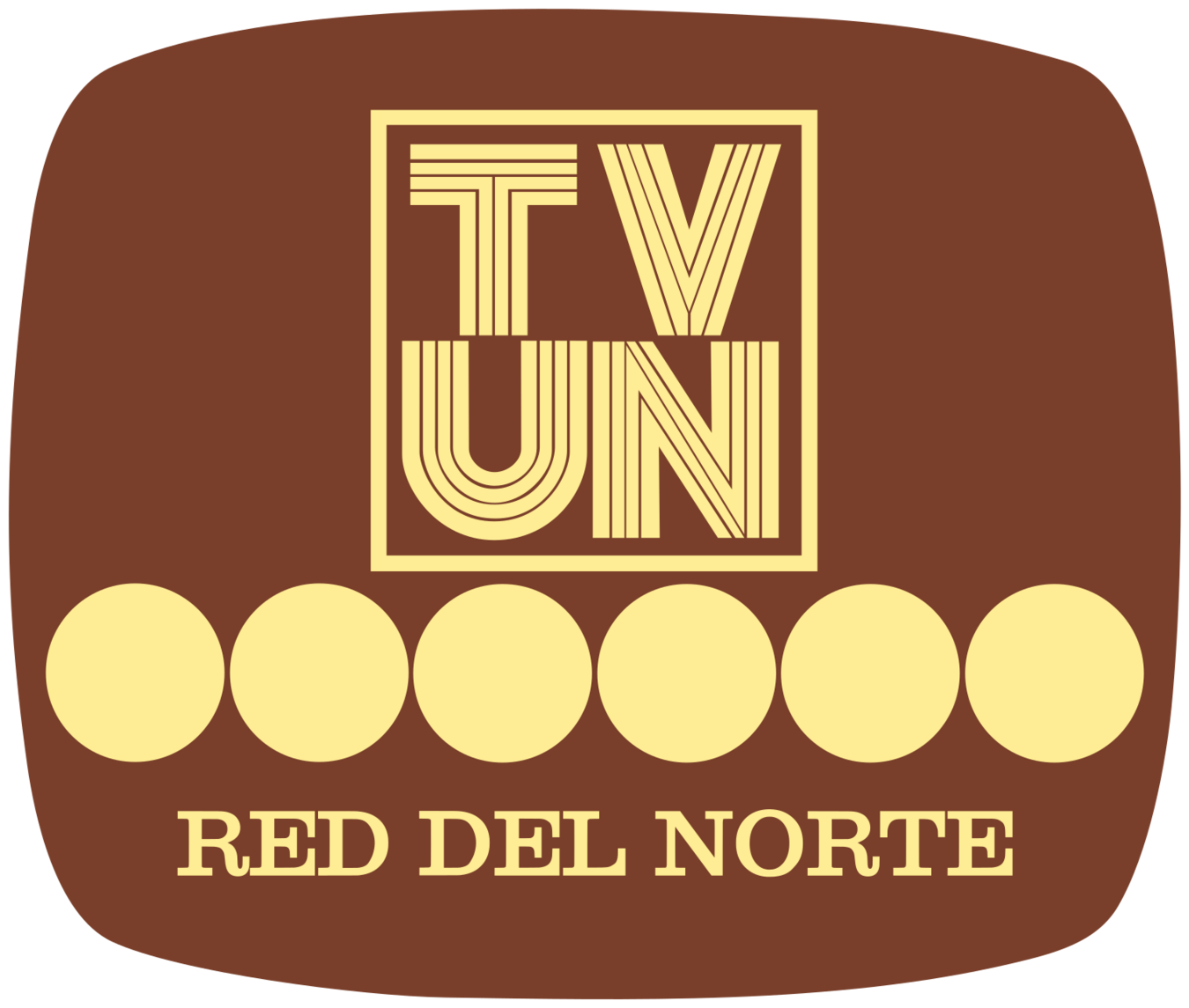
1977-1982.

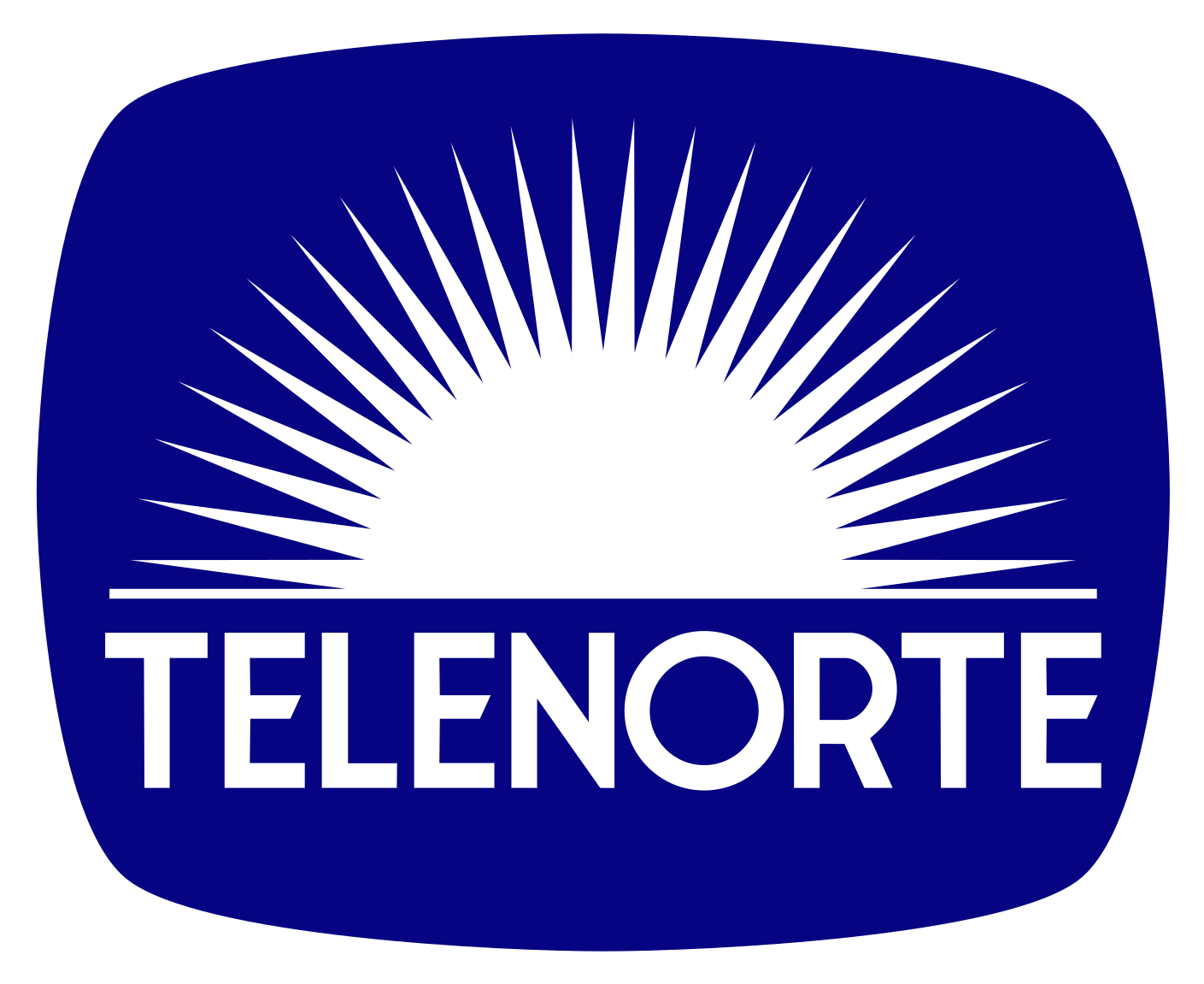
1982-1995.

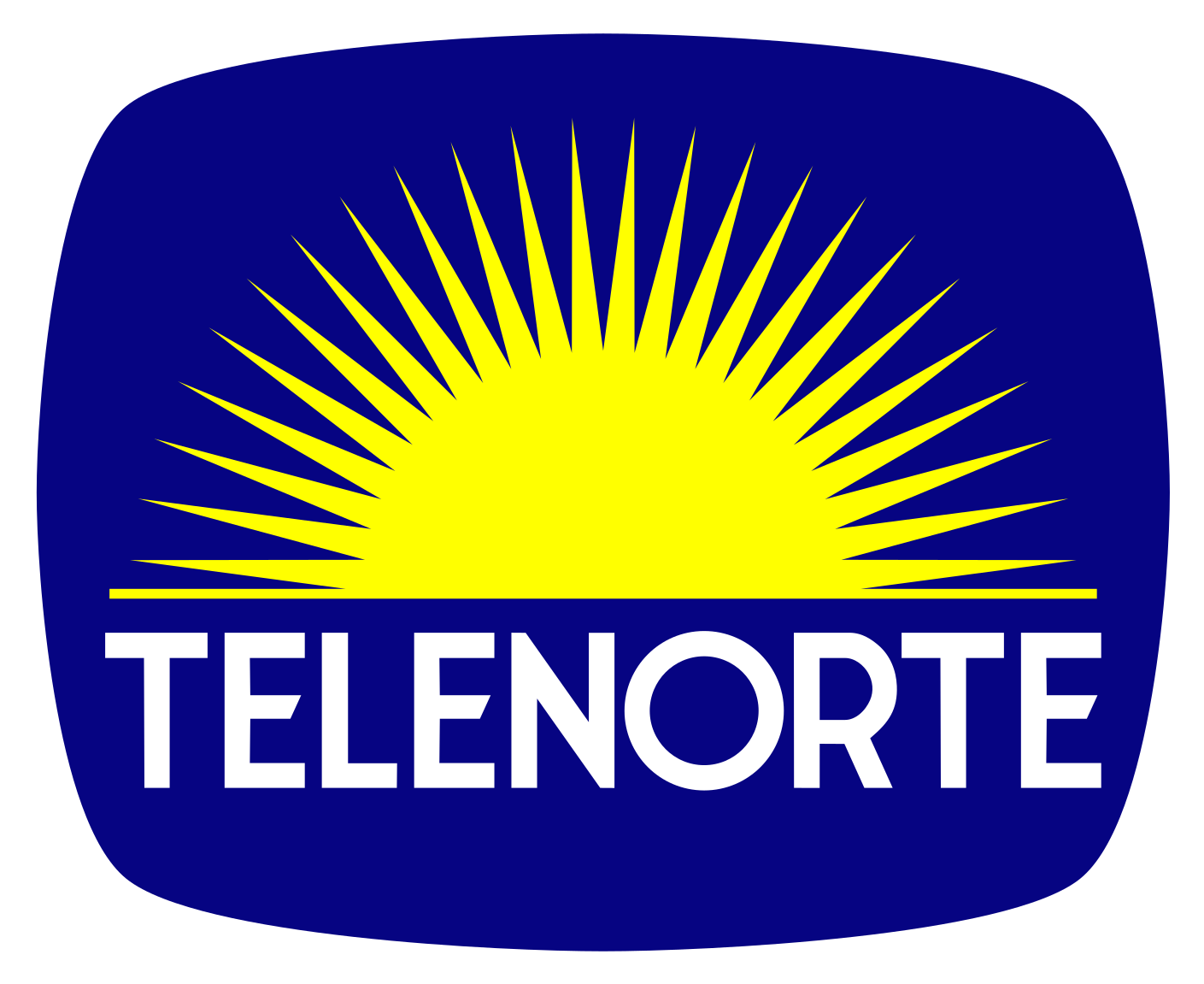
1995-2000.

2000-2001.
