= Canal 6 (Chile) =

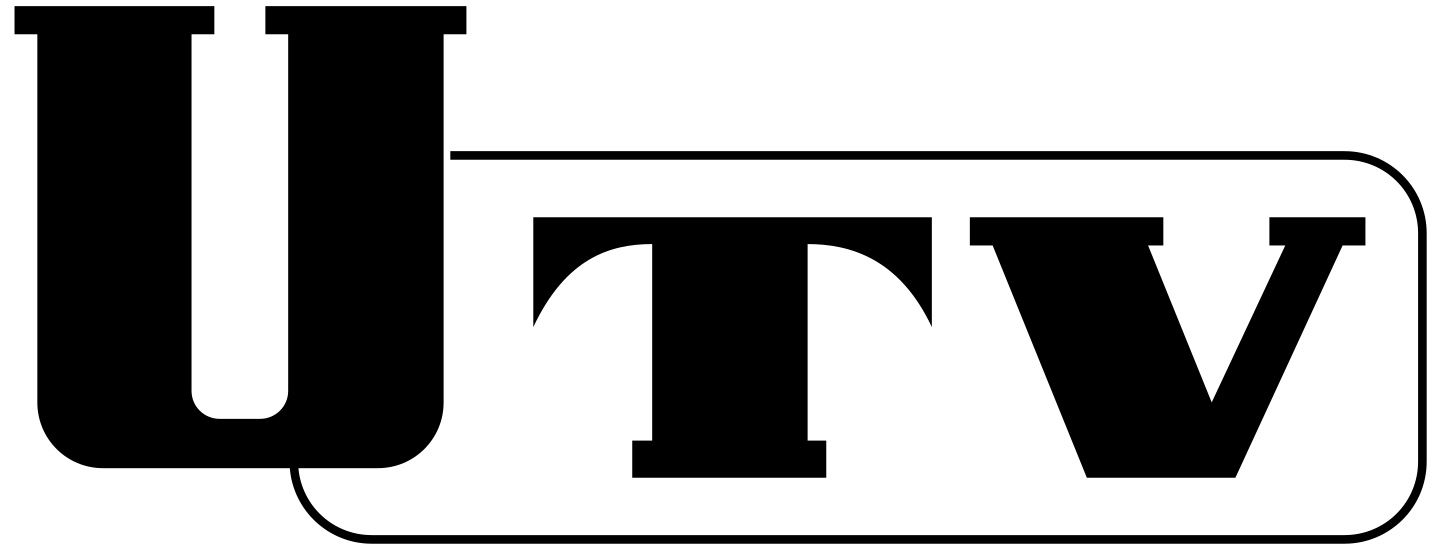
- Country: Chile

Programming
- Language: Spanish

Ownership
- Owner: University of Chile

History
- Launched: 17 June 1973; 52 years ago
- Closed: 18 November 1973; 52 years ago

Availability

Terrestrial
- Santiago: Channel 9

Canal 6 —formally Corporación de Televisión de la Universidad de Chile— was the temporary station owned by the University of Chile from June to November 1973, due to the takeover of the original station (Canal 9) by workers who supported Popular Unity.

== History ==
=== Background ===
In October 1972, the Superior Council of the University of Chile called for a public contest to replace all positions in the Press Department of Channel 9, a fact that increased the existing struggle between the Board of Directors of the Television Corporation and the channel's Union; In the words of Juan Ángel Torti, they sought to "change almost all of the journalists on Channel 9 who were left-wing" and the Workers' Assembly of the television station denounced said contest as a "political maneuver" and used Channel 9 as "yet another organ of the Chilean reaction".

On January 2, 1973, the journalists who had won the contest began their work, however the Channel 9 workers prevented them from entering the facilities. The conflict continued, which led to the television station being taken over and under the direct control of its workers between January 19 and September 8, 1973. The then head of the Channel Defense Committee was Augusto Carmona, also elected by his colleagues from Nuevediario as press chief, which generated a new struggle with the university. On March 5, 1973, the Comptroller General of Chile declared the call for competition illegal, since it was not made by the corporation but by the Superior Council of the university.

=== Founding and police raid ===
As a result of the takeover of the television station, the group of workers who supported Rector Boeninger began to meet in the offices of the University of Chile located at Amunátegui 73, preparing the programming that would be aired once the studios at Ines Matte Urrejola 0825 were recovered. At the same time, different programs began to be recorded in the Protab studios.

In April 1973, the written press reported that the launch of "Teleonce" was planned for the following month, a new channel of the University of Chile that would broadcast on frequency 11 to replace Channel 9, which was still in use. In response to this, the Superintendency of Electrical, Gas and Telecommunications Services (Segtel) denounced that the airing of Channel 11 would be illegal, and on April 6, it authorized experimental transmissions for six months of a channel of the State Technical University (UTE) that would occupy said frequency (11). The authorities of the University of Chile denounced that this measure was illegal, since the legislation exclusively authorized the universities de Chile, Catholic of Chile and Catholic of Valparaíso —in addition to Televisión Nacional de Chile— to operate television channels, which was reaffirmed by the National Television Council on April 18.

On June 16, 1973, the University of Chile announced that it was no longer transmitting on channel 9 and created Canal 6, starting its broadcasts regularly the next day at 8:05 p.m. The choice of frequency 6 had symbolism for the university, since it corresponded to "an inverted 9" in the words of its directors. Its transmitter was of limited power (1.5 kW) so the channel's broadcasts only covered the eastern sector of the Chilean capital, although it was expected that in the future they could reach up to Curicó or Talca.

The Popular Unity government would label the launch of Channel 6 as illegal. In the early hours of June 19, the studios of Channel 6—located at Avenida Pedro de Valdivia 2454, Providencia—were raided by the Investigations Police and some equipment was seized, but the station still restarted its transmissions on frequency 6 on July 7. The assault on the headquarters of Channel 6 motivated the deputies opposed to the Popular Unity to present a constitutional accusation against the minister of the interior, Gerardo Espinoza Carrillo, which was approved by the Senate on July 19, 1973, being removed from office.

Part of its own programming was carried out from the 2 studios owned by the Channel 6 headquarters (equipped with 3 television cameras), while the rest was produced in the Protab studios. At 4:15 in the morning on August 11, a bomb was thrown by unknown persons that detonated in the front garden of the channel, without causing damage to the infrastructure. On August 23, the channel reported that elements from its retransmission plant in Agua Santa (Valparaíso) were stolen.

=== Return to channel 9 ===
On September 8, 1973, a contingent of carabineers entered the studios of Channel 9 by order of the mayor of the province of Santiago, Julio Stuardo, and the next day the University of Chile recovered frequency 9 as a result of an agreement between the State Technical University (UTE), the corporation and the channel's unions. The University of Chile would have to choose which channel (and, therefore, which personnel) it would stay with—with 6 or 9—and the UTE would be in charge of the other frequency. However, the fall of Salvador Allende frustrated the UTE's plans to have its own television channel, since the Military Board did not recognize the agreement reached between the universities.

After the military coup of September 11, 1973, Channel 6 was off the air, resuming its broadcasts on September 15 and broadcasting only the official news prepared by Canal 13 and foreign material. On the 17th of the same month, the university authorities were able to enter the premises of the unoccupied Channel 9 to verify damage and see if it was possible to restart its broadcasts through said frequency; That same day the broadcast of the news program TeleU restarted at 9:30pm. The return to channel 9 was held on November 18.
