= Maria Paz Bertoglia =

Chilean epidemiologist

Maria Paz Bertoglia Arredondo
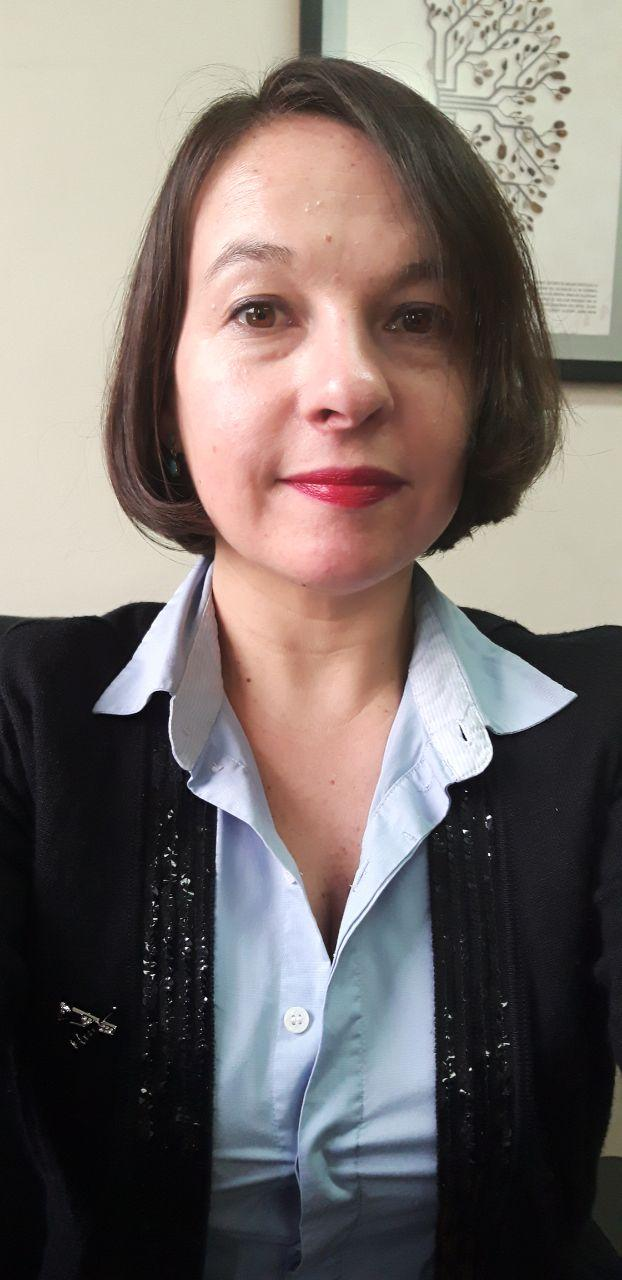
- Maria paz Beroglia in 2019
- Born: February 14, 1978 (age 48); Valparaíso, Chile
- Education: Universidad de Chile
- Title: President Chilean Epidemiology Society

Maria Paz Bertoglia (born February 14, 1978) is a Chilean epidemiologist who works in public health research, teaching, and science communication in social media.

== Early life and career ==
Maria Paz Bertoglia Arredondo, the daughter of a paediatrician mother and an otorhinolaryngologist father, grew up in the Chilean cities of Copiapó and Valparaíso

Bertoglia graduated as kinesiologist in 2001 at the Pontifical Catholic University of Valparaíso, Chile, she also completed an MSc in epidemiology at Pontifical Catholic University of Chile, an MSc in biostatistics at University of Chile in 2016 and a PhD in Public Health at University of Chile. She started her professional life as a kinesiologist, but changed to academia. She was a professor at the Catholic University of the North and at the Andrés Bello National University and then assistant professor at the faculty of medicine of the University of Chile.

== Public health outreach ==
Bertoglia has coordinated health teams at national and international levels. She has worked at the Pan-American Health Organization and in the Public Health Institute in Chile, among other academic and health institutions. She is currently Member of the Editor Board at Social Medical Notebooks published by the Chilean professional Order of physicians, president at Chilean Epidemiology Society and Member of the Immunization Advisory Committee at the Chilean Infectology Society.

== Television and popular culture ==
Bertoglia is a founding member of the Chilean scientific outreach publication Etilmercurio and she teaches critical thinking at the University of Chile. She has been vocal about the promotion of snake oil cures and conspiracy theories by the Chilena television, where she is frequently interviewed herself.

Bertoglia has given advice and participated in the public debate on television and radio about mayor health issues such as the flu and vaccination policies. She has also spoken about addictions such as alcoholism and cigarette smoking, including the lack of regulation and the dangers of electronic cigarettes and the scandal involving UNICEF and the tobacco industry

Bertoglia declined to participate in televised debate with anti-vaccination proponents, stating that she would not validate an artificial debate that could generate the false perception that both sides of the debate where equally valid, confusing the population. During the 2019-2020 COVID-19 pandemic, Bertoglia has been in the media giving science-based advice and also as a harsh critic of the government of Sebastian Piñera and its handling of the pandemic and the scarcity of data available for scientist and public health researchers to make recommendations
