= Telenorte La Serena y Coquimbo =

Telenorte
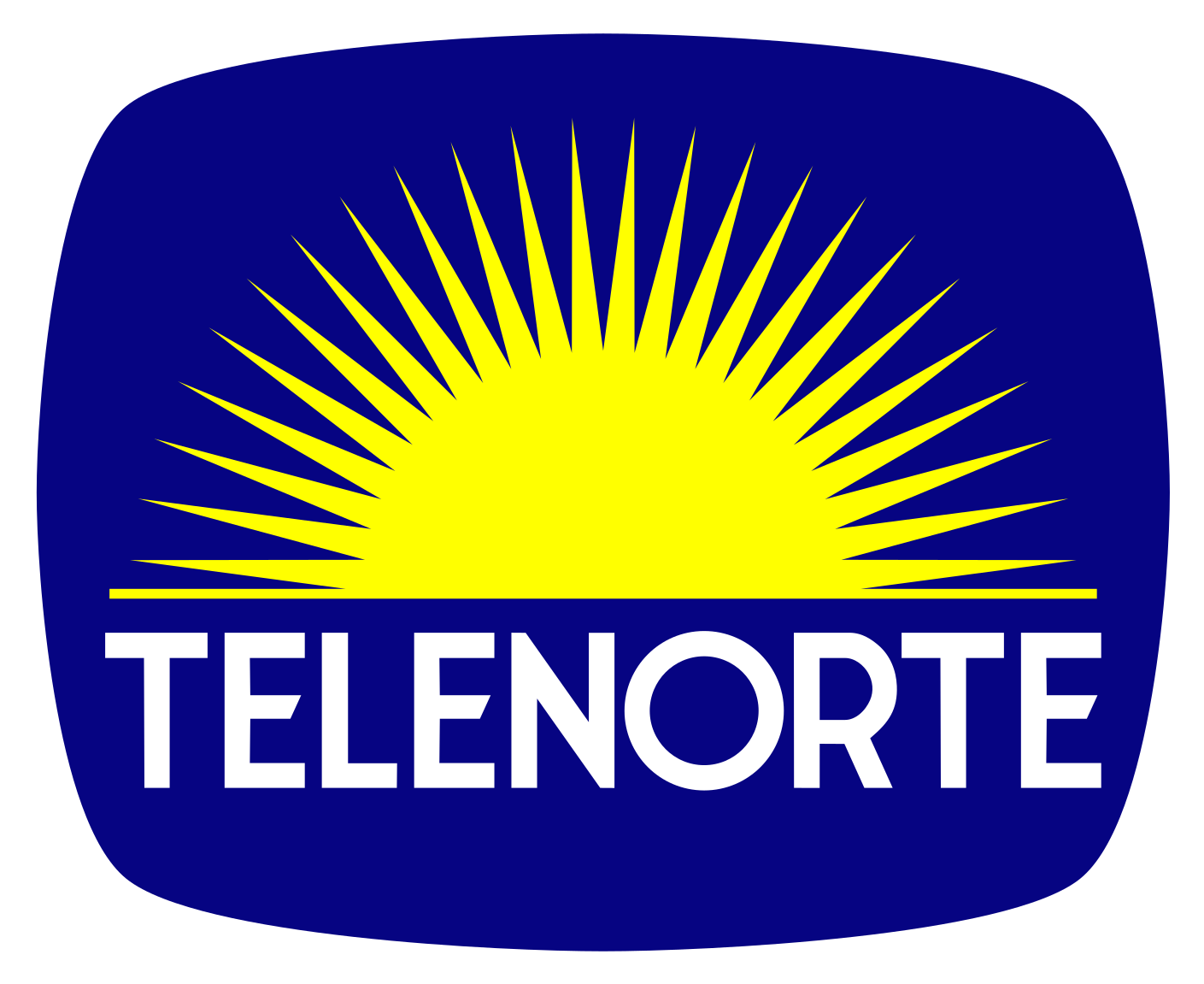

Ownership
- Owner: Catholic University of the North (1992-1995); Radio Chilena (1995-1998)

History
- Launched: November 15, 1992
- Closed: June 7, 1998

Availability

Terrestrial
- Analog (La Serena): 5

Telenorte La Serena y Coquimbo (channel 5) was a Chilean television station licensed to La Serena and was part of Telenorte. Its broadcasts started on November 15, 1992 and shut down on June 7, 1998, becoming a relay of the Arica station until its closure in 2001.

== Historay ==
On March 6, 1991, the National Television Council authorized Red de Televisión Universidad del Norte S.A. the launch of its subsidiary in La Serena and Coquimbo within a 13-month deadline; on April 13, 1992, Telenorte solicited an extension of the launch deadline, which was approved by the council on July 9 of the same year.

Telenorte's broadcasts to La Serena and Coquimbo on VHF channel 5 began on November 15, 1992 at 5pm; the previous day, its official launch was made at Hostería La Serena, with the participation of Luis Campusano Andrade (director general of Telenorte), Silvia Pinto Limpedis (the station's first director general), Patricio Ovalle (commercial manager) amd Annabella Stoppel (television presenter). In its early months, its programming was exclusively made up of children's programs, relays from La Red and productions from Televisión Española.

In 1993, Ximena Aranda Cañas became the station's director, and, under her control, local programs appeared, such as the local editions of UCN Noticias, morning show Buenos Días Región, children's program Haciendo las tareas con Telenorte and youth program El submarino.

On June 7, 1998, Telenorte La Serena y Coquimbo ceased local origination, becoming a full-time relay of the Arica station; at closing time, the station employed around 30 staff members and its director was Debbie Queny Spring. Among the reasons for the closure of the local station was the lack of advertiser support from local companies, which affected its financing and the quality of its programming, and the arrival of cable and satellite television companies.
