= Telenorte Iquique =

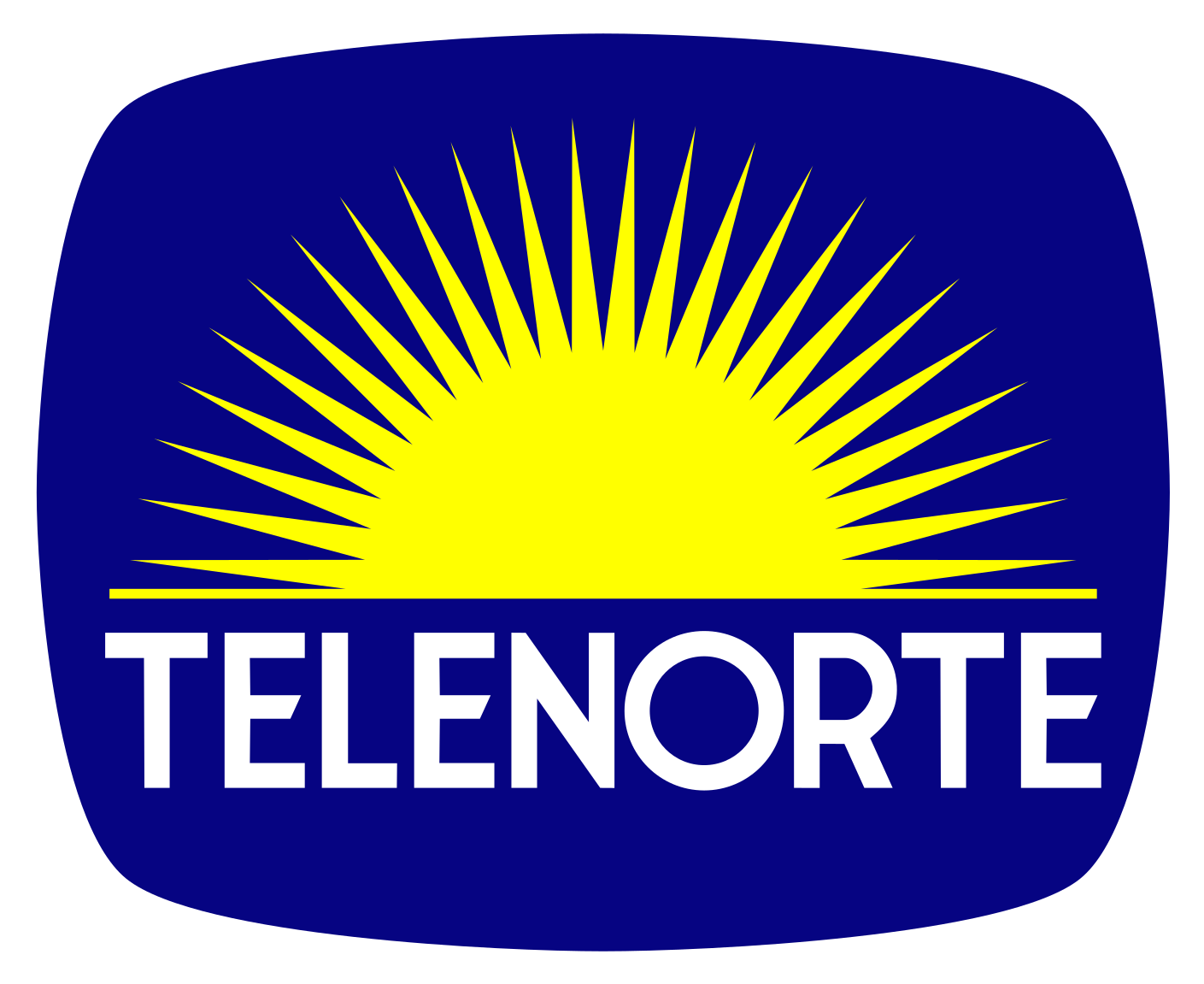

Ownership
- Owner: Catholic University of the North (1976-1994); Radio Chilena (1994-1997)

History
- Launched: May 21, 1976
- Closed: July 22, 1997

Availability

Terrestrial
- Analog (Iquique): 12

Telenorte Iquique (channel 12) was a Chilean television station licensed to Iquique and was a part of Telenorte. It started broadcasting in 1976 and shut down in 1997, becoming a relay of the Arica station until the network closed in 2001.

== History ==
The local television station of the Catholic University of the North in Iquique made an experimental color broadcast on December 24, 1975, at 8:30pm on channel 10, airing a message from the intendant of Tarapacá Region, Hernán Fuenzalida Vigar, and two feature films: The Circus and Charly. The team behind the first broadcast consisted César Celedón (director), Javier Canales (electronic engineer), Sánchez y Astorga (lighting), Óscar Iturra and Javier Sánchez (studio coordination), Mario Cruz (audio), Guillermo Ward (make-up), Juan Aguilar (art cards), Paco Herrera y Juan Armando (camarographs), whereas Jorge Iturra and Guillermo Jorquera were the station's first announcers.

In the months that followed its test broadcast, work for the definitive launch of the Iquique station took place: a relay station at the Tarapacá mountain was installed and, during May, it received, from Valparaíso, technical equipment to operate it. In its headquarters, located at Wilson Street, two studios, a telecine room, a transmission control room and units for make-up, lighting and design were set up.

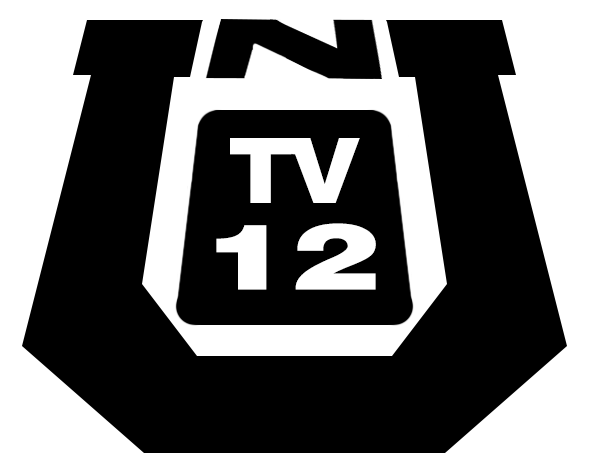
Logo of Canal 12 (1976–1977)

Broadcasts of Canal 12 Iquique officially began on May 21, 1976, at 6:30pm; t he first announcers that appeared screen were Balmores Fajardo and Cuqui Flores, whereas the station director was Óscar Iturra Peña (vice-principal of the Iquique headquarters of the University of the North). That day, it aired the civic-military act that happened at Plaza 11 de Mayo avenue that morning, and in the following days, its programming consisted of 70% pre-recorded programming and 30% live output.

The station started a new schedule on June 1, 1976, with the arrival of a package of 160 feature-length movies, as well as the addition of new programs, such as its news bulletin Norte noticias, interview program Iquique 76, a children's program and local sports shows; matches of the nascent Club de Deportes Iquique were recorded in color and aired on tape delay in 1979. Although the station had color equipment, the Regional Intendancy declared that its broadcasts were in black and white in order to follow the norms of those broadcasts, moreover, since September 1976, the import of color television sets into Chile was forbidden.

In June 1976, the station's antenna, located at the crossing between Baquedano and Wilson Street, increased its height from 18 to 27 meters, which enabled the improvement of the station's reception in Playa Brava and Barrio Industrial; later, in September of the same year, the new antenna at the Tarapacá mountain was already functional.

In December 1976, the University of the North signed a relaying agreement of programs from Canal 13 —with a two-week delay for Iquique —, whereas the regional network (named «Red Norte de Televisión») was created in May 1977; one of its first successes was the broadcast of the first Teletón in 1978, which it aired entirely in color.

In 1980, the station produced (and relayed to all stations part of Red Norte de Televisión) the variety show Noches estelares, one of the first prime time variety shows on Chilean regional television; made by production company Aymara (whose owners were Jorge and Sergio Rivera), airing live from Motel Huantajaya, in Playa Brava, and directed by Sandy Carvajal and produced by Jorge Mackenna. Several national artists appeared on the show, among them Fernando Ubiergo, Patricia Maldonado, Buddy Richard and Jorge Romero, among others.

Its signal was relayed at Pozo Almonte — where it started broadcasting in 1980, initially on channel 8 before relocating to channel 7 —, Pica and Camiña (channel 4).

Leonardo Naveas presented the local news between 1976 and 1995. Telenorte Iquique's last director was Andrés Leyton, who began his career at the channel in July 1985 and was in charge of closing the station and firing its staff in 1997. In 1996, Profesor Sorpresa debuted, presented by teacher Cristian Saavedra, who was the presenter of Haciendo las tareas con Telenorte.

The local station ceased originating programming on July 22, 1997, becoming a relay of the Arica station, which eventually shut down on October 30, 2001.
