= Telenorte Arica =

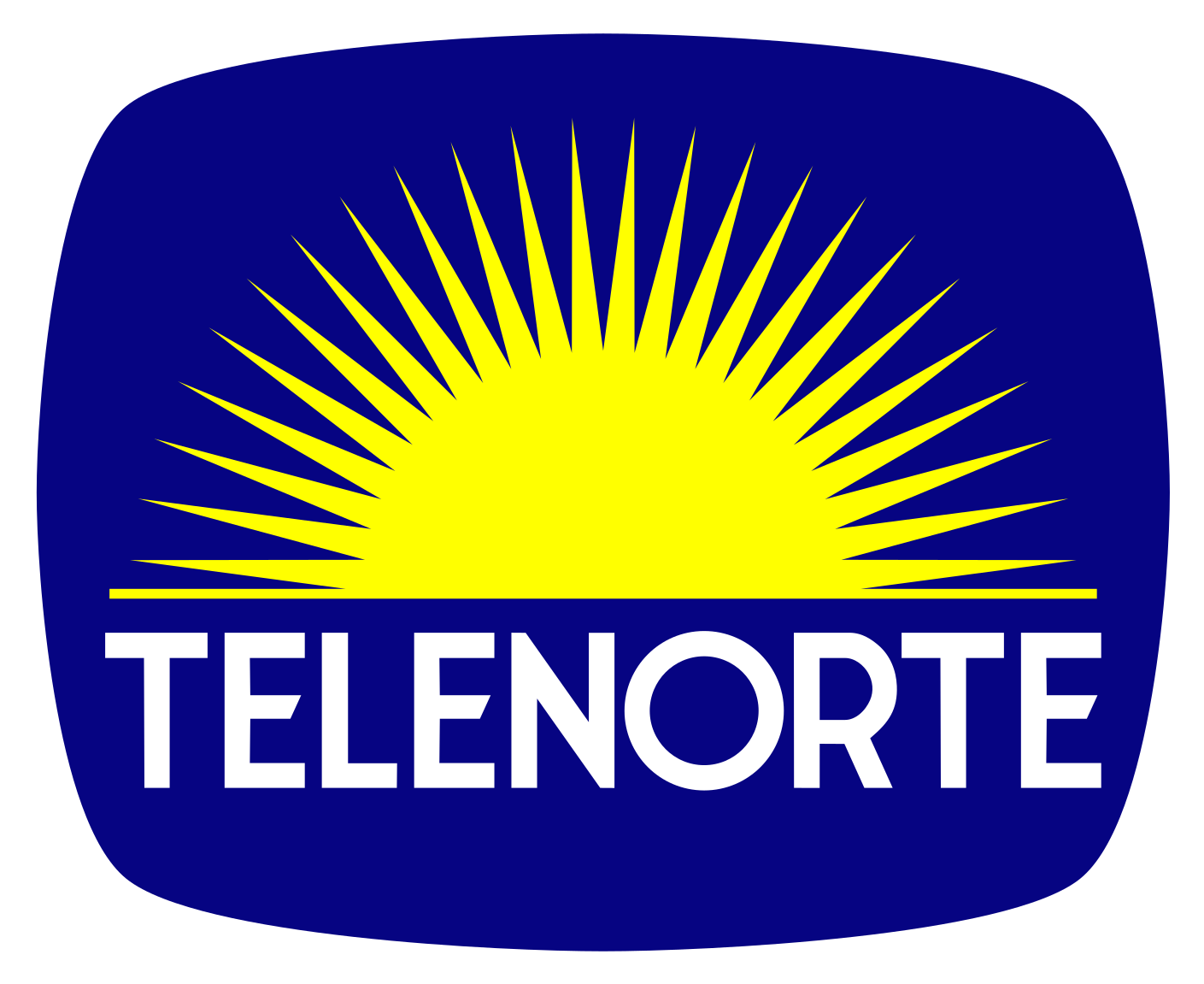

Ownership
- Owner: Catholic University of the North (1966–1994); Radio Chilena (1994–2001); Kroma Comunicaciones (2001)

History
- Launched: 6 June 1976
- Closed: 30 October 2001

Availability

Terrestrial
- Analog (Arica): 11

Telenorte Arica (channel 11) was a Chilean television station licensed to Arica and was a part of Telenorte. It started broadcasting in 1976, as part of the expansion plan of the Antofagasta station to cover Arica and Iquique, subsequently forming a network. After a cost-cutting plan initiated by its new owners Radio Chilena, which led to the closure of its other production centers, the entirety of the Telenorte network was originated from Arica. In 2001, Radio Chilena sold the station to Kroma Producciones, resulting in the dismissal of its staff (25 to 30) and the closure of the network.

== History ==
On 24 December 1975, in his opening speech of the University of the North-administered Channel 12 in Iquique, Tarapacá regional intendant Hernán Fuenzalida Vigar announced that the station —which was delivering an experimental color signal— would also arrive to Arica, which was reaffirmed when such station started full-time broadcasts on 21 May 1976. The first pieces of equipment which arrived to Arica in late May were a video cassette recorder and a color monitor, whereas on 5 June, cameras with monitors and sound control, and a telecine machine —coming from Antofagasta— arrived.

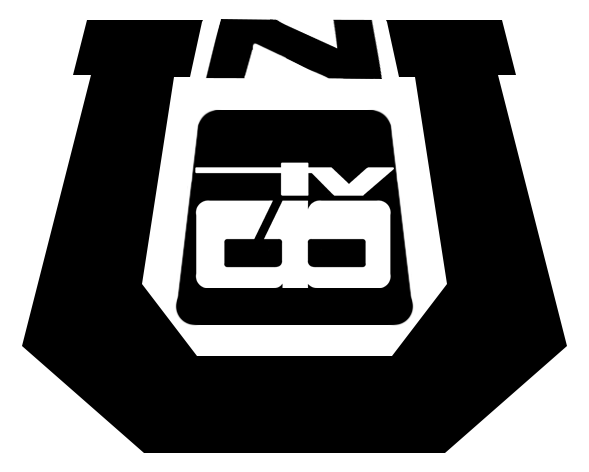
Logo of Canal 10 (1976-1977)

Channel 10 opened on 6 June 1976, during the anniversary of the Battle of Arica; broadcasts began at 6:15pm with —announcer and director of Radio UNA (Universidad del Norte sede Arica)— as the first face seen on the station, followed by the governor of Arica Province, Óscar Figueroa Márquez,and a series of interviews made by the vice-principal of UNA, Félix Viveros, to the mayor of Arica (Manuel Castillo Ibaceta), the president of the city's chamber of commerce (Gastón Cavada), the vice-president of the Arica Industrials Association (Jorge Santibáñez) and the provincial president of the Production and Commerce Confederation (Emilio Gutiérrez).

Although it was initially established to broadcast for only three days, finally, the broadcasts were authorized permanently, in tandem with that, a fundraising campaign to finance its permanent equipment began, which cost a total of US$120,000; whereas the studios were located in the Arica campus of the University of the North, at 18 de Septiembre 2222 (currently used by the University of Tarapacá).

The regional network (named «Red Norte de Televisión») was created in May 1977 —just a few months earlier, in December 1976, it had signed a relay agreement with Canal 13 to air its programs on a seven-week delay in the case of Arica— and one of its first successes was the broadcast of the first Teletón in 1978, which it aired entirely in color.

On 6 April 1979, Channel 10's new studios were inaugurated, located at El Cobre 1262 (between Barros Arana and Azola Street), in the city's industrial district, alongside the introduction of its videotape filming and color equipment which had been acquired on loan by the Tarapacá Region Intendancy. at the time, the local station director was Iván Araneda. Later, it moved to new studios built at Diego Portales 651.

The station broadcast on VHF channel 10 between June 1976 and July 1982, month in which it moved to channel 11, where it was located until its permanent shutdown in December 2001; on 30 July 1982, the new transmitter located at the city's headland was inaugurated.

After the closure of Telenorte's production centers in Iquique (22 July 1997), Antofagasta (16 January 1998) and La Serena (7 June 1998), the Arica station became the only production center, valid for its entire coverage area. After Radio Chilena decided to sell Telenorte to audiovisual production company Kroma Comunicaciones Ltda., it fired all of the Arica station's staff (between 25 and 30 people; 30 according to staff, 25 according to its executives), leading to its closure on 30 October 2001. At around 6pm, when the measure was taken, the station halted programming and started airing music videos, interspersed with occasional test patterns, until the signal was cut off at 9pm. In the days after its closure, its signal only aired two hours of music videos and documentaries in order to comply with norms to avoid its license from being revoked, until, in December, the license was rented to UCV Televisión, and, later, in 2005, Telecanal.
