= Protab =

Chilean production company

- Industry: Television production
- Founded: 1962
- Headquarters: Santiago, Chile

Protab (Sociedad Productora de Programas de Televisión, Ltda.) was a Chilean television production company active during the 1960s and 1970s, considered as the creator of the telenovela industry in the country. Its studios were located at Tarapacá 752, downtown Santiago de Chile, and had one of Chile's first mobile broadcast units.

== History ==
Protab's origins are traced down to Protel (Promoción, Propaganda y Televisión Ltda.), a company founded in 1962 —officially formed by means of a notarial act 14 January 1963— and linked to Canal 13, which distributed and marketed filmed foreign material such as TV series and telenovelas; it was also in charge for revealing film of news footage used on El repórter Esso, Canal 13's newscast of the time, and the operation of the filming equipment for the FIS Alpine World Ski Championships 1966, held in Portillo. On 11 August 1967, Osvaldo Barzelatto and Ricardo Miranda officially created Protab through an alliance between Protel and American network ABC, which respectively offered 52% and 48% of their capital composition.

Among some of Protab's staff were filmmaker Silvio Caiozzi, TV director at the company between 1968 and 1969; Germán Becker Ureta; Helvio Soto; Patricio Kaulen, Juan Agustín Vargas, Leopoldo Contreras, José Caviedes and Arturo Moya Grau. In January 1969, Protab received a capital increase from ABC, which consisted of two trucks with laboratories to make outside broadcasts.

By 1973. Protab produced programs for both Canal 13 and TVN, as well as Canal 6 —temporary station the University of Chile had following the takeover of Canal 9— and UTE TV 11 —television project of the Technical University of the State which was cut short because of the 1973 coup—; as well as sending foreign programming (main ly American cartoons, TV series and movies) to Canal 3 TVUN in Antofagasta, which had restarted its broadcasts on February 14 that year. It was also in charge of producing the international final of the OTI Festival 1978, with Fernando Leighton the director in charge and Pedro Miranda the general producer.

The production company was declared bankrupt in December 1977 and disappeared on 28 June 1979, when ABC transferred its assets to Pan American Television and Cinema Corp. (PTC) —represented by Ricardo Miranda— and Protel transferred its to Fundación Civitas. One of the causes of its closure was due to the black and white technology which was getting obsolete when color television was being introduced in Chile, and Protab was unable to modernize its equipment.

At closing time, Protab was producing a historic telenovela named La leona, which was to be set in the War of the Pacific, and whose scripts were in charge of Fernando Cuadra; in May 1979 Canal 9 quit airing the series, though it was assigned CL$344,000 from the National Television Council. Later, in August 1981, the former Protab studios were used to record Canal 13's telenovela Casagrande, while Estudios KV 1850 were used for La madrastra.

== Productions ==
- Antes de y después de (UCV-TV)
- Ayúdeme usted, compadre (Canal 13)
- Canturreando (Canal 13, 1974–1979)
- Contacto con las estrellas (Canal 13)
- Dominó (Canal 13)
- El doctor Mortis (Canal 13, 1972–1973)
- El show de Silvia Piñeiro (1970)
- Este Lucho sabe mucho (Canal 13, 1964)
- La silla eléctrica (Canal 13, 1973-1974)
- La vuelta al mundo (Canal 13, 1974-1975)
- Los compatriotas
- Quién soy yo (Canal 13 and TVN, 1967–1978)

=== Series and telenovelas ===
- El litre 4916 (Canal 13, 1965)
- Haras La Revoltosa (Canal 13, 1966)
- Juani en sociedad (Canal 13, 1967–1972)
- El socio (Canal 13, 1968)
- Amalia (Canal 13, 1968)
- El rosario de plata (Canal 13, 1969)
- La chica del bastón (Canal 13, 1969)
- Mi papá y mi mamá (TVN, 1969)
- Cuarteto para instrumentos de muerte (TVN, 1970)
- Martín Rivas (TVN, 1970)
- El padre Gallo (TVN, 1970)
- María José (Canal 13, 1975)
- La otra Soledad (Canal 13, 1975)
- J. J. Juez (Canal 13, 1975)
- Los amigos (Canal 13, 1976)
- Sol tardío (TVN, 1976)
- El padre Gallo (Canal 13, 1977)
- El secreto de Isabel (TVN, 1977)
- La Colorina (TVN, 1977)
