= Ana del aire =

Mexican telenovela

- Genre: Telenovela
- Created by: Fernanda Villeli
- Directed by: Dimitrio Sarrás
- Starring: Angélica María; Fernando Allende; Andrés García
- Opening theme: "Nuestro adiós" by Angélica María
- Country of origin: Mexico
- Original language: Spanish

Production
- Executive producer: Ernesto Alonso

Original release
- Network: Canal de las Estrellas
- Release: 1974

Ana del aire is a Mexican telenovela produced by Ernesto Alonso for Canal de las Estrellas in 1974. Starring Angélica María and Fernando Allende.

== Plot ==
Ana is a flight attendant who lives with Andrea, who believes it is his mother who in turn was separated from his father, Esteban; Elena and her sister, who suffered from polio as a child, being invalid and hooks on their legs, so grew complexed with feelings of hatred toward her.

== Cast ==
- Angélica María as Ana
- Fernando Allende as Gerardo
- Andrés García as Jorge Romero
- Jaime Moreno as Aníbal
- Sasha Montenegro as Dolly
- Susana Alexander as Lola
- Armando Silvestre as Esteban
- Silvia Derbez as Andrea
- María Rubio as Vera
- César del Campo as Gastón
- Susana Dosamantes as Norma
- María Eugenia Ríos as Inés
- Lupita D'Alessio as Consuelo
- Miguel Macía as Armando
- Zoila Quiñones as Elena
- Patricia Panini as Vilma
- Daniel Santalucía as Juan
- Alfredo Torres as Luis
- Miguel Ángel Ferriz as Mesero
- Raúl Boxer as Lic. Basurto
- Nélida as Paula Dopson
- Javier Ruán as Alex
- Alicia Palacios as Rosa
- Chela Nájera as Teresa
- José Loza as Miguel Espino
- Héctor Cruz as Tom
- Tita Grieg as Tita
