= Colorina (Mexican TV series) =

1980 Mexican telenovela

- Genre: Telenovelas
- Created by: Jam Díaz
- Written by: Antonio Monsell; Carlos Romero
- Story by: Arturo Moya Gray; Vivian Pestalozzi
- Directed by: Dimitrio Sarrás; Noé Alcantará
- Starring: Lucía Méndez; Enrique Álvarez Félix; Julissa; José Alonso
- Theme music composer: Javier Ortega
- Opening theme: "Colorina" by Camilo Sesto
- Country of origin: Mexico
- Original language: Spanish
- No. of episodes: 250

Production
- Executive producer: Valentín Pimstein
- Producer: Luis de Llano
- Camera setup: Multi-camera
- Production company: Televisa

Original release
- Network: Canal de las Estrellas
- Release: March 4, 1980 – February 12, 1981

Related
- Colorina

Colorina (English title: Redhead) is a Mexican telenovela produced by Valentín Pimstein for Televisa in 1980. It was a remake of La Colorina, while remakes of Colorina are Apasionada and Salomé.

Lucía Méndez and Enrique Álvarez Félix starred as protagonists, while José Alonso and María Teresa Rivas starred as antagonists. María Rubio, Julissa and Armando Calvo co-starred in secondary performances.

This telenovela is well remembered for its daring move to feature a cabaret dancer/prostitute as the protagonist, a decision that would lead to Televisa being forced by then-president, José López Portillo under the wishes of his mother to classify it a C rating, moving it to the 11:00 pm time slot & changing the channel in which it was shown in seeing it as "improper" to feature a prostitute as the main character on prime time television. The huge ratings success of the telenovela however, and the fact that Lucia Mendez's character doesn't remain a prostitute for long allowed for Colorina to return to Canal 2 and its original timeslot. [1] [2]

== Plot ==
Gustavo Adolfo Almazán is a repressed millionaire married to an invalid named Alba. His life is dictated by his tyrannical mother Ana María. One night, Iván, a rascal brother-in-law of Gustavo, brings two drunken cabaret singers, Fernanda and Rita, to the Almazán household and they start a raucous party. This is how Gustavo meets Fernanda, alias Colorina (on account of her red hair) with whom he’ll share a passionate love affair.

Ana María wants a grandchild and pays Fernanda to have a child with her son, on condition that she gives it to Alba to raise as her own. Although Fernanda initially agrees with the plan, she changes her mind after her son is born. Fernanda flees to Hermosillo, Sonora where she starts a new life. Twenty years later, Fernanda is a respectable matron, the prosperous owner of a boutique. She decides to return to Mexico and introduce her biological son and two adopted sons to the Almazán family to see if they can guess which one is Gustavo Adolfo’s son.

== Cast ==
=== Main ===
- Lucía Méndez as Fernanda Redes Paredes "Colorina"
- Enrique Álvarez Félix as Gustavo Adolfo Almazán y de la Vega
- Julissa as Rita
- José Alonso as Iván

=== Recurring ===
- María Teresa Rivas as Ana María de la Vega de Almazán
- Armando Calvo as Guillermo Almazán
- María Sorté as Mirta
- Alejandro Tommasi as Doménico
- Liliana Abud as Alba de Almazán
- María Rubio as Ami
- Fernando Larrañaga as Dr. Ulloa
- Luis Bayardo as Polidoro "Poli"
- Héctor Ortega as Toribio
- Liliana Abud as Alba de Almazán
- Elizabeth Dupeyrón as Marcia Valdés de Paredes
- Guillermo Capetillo as José Miguel Redes
- Juan Antonio Edwards as Armando Redes
- José Elías Moreno as Danilo Redes
- Roxana Saucedo as Mónica Pedres Valdés
- Salvador Pineda as Enrique
- Alberto Inzúa as Matías
- Alba Nydia Díaz as Laiza Vicuña
- Arturo Lorca as Liborio
- Alma Delfina as La Pingüica
- Elsa Cárdenas as Adela'
- Yuri as Italia "Ita" Ferrari
- Christian Bach as Peggy
- Eugenio Cobo as Lic. Germán Burgos
- Roberto Ballesteros as Julián Saldívar
- Patricia Ancira as Lupe
- Marina Dorell as Cristina
- Juan Luis Galiardo as Aníbal Gallardo y Rincón
- Beatriz Aguirre as Iris
- Enrique Beraza as Emilio
- Debbie D'Green as Bailarina
- Alfredo García Márquez as Domingo
- Federico Falcón as Norberto Pedres
- Enrique Hidalgo as Dr. Marín
- Enrique Gilabert as Detective
- Óscar Bonfiglio as Enrique's friend
- Marichu de Labra as Teresa
- Martha Resnikoff as Dressmaker
- Carlos Pouliot as Iván's friend
- Myrrah Saavedra as Maid of Almazán's family

== Lyrics of the song ==
Colorina
con tu canto de golondrina
y ese sueño en la piel
has llenado de ti mi vida.

Colorina,
corazón de ternura escondida,
bajo tu mando de amor
llevas mi alma prendida.

Colorina...

Nuestro amor no tendrá final
porque ha echado su raíz
mas allá del bien y el mal,
porque es puro como el agua de manantial.
