= Viviana (TV series) =

- Genre: Telenovela
- Created by: Original story: Inés Rodena; Carmen Daniels; Tere Medina; Adaptation: Luis Reyes de la Maza
- Based on: Tormenta de pasiones by Caridad Bravo Adams
- Directed by: Dimitrius Sarrás
- Starring: Lucía Méndez; Héctor Bonilla
- Theme music composer: Javier Ortega
- Opening theme: "Viviana" by Lucía Méndez
- Country of origin: Mexico
- Original language: Spanish

Production
- Executive producer: Valentín Pimstein
- Cinematography: Fernando Chacón; Dimitrius Sarrás

Original release
- Network: Canal de las Estrellas
- Release: May 22, 1978 – March 8, 1979

Related
- El engaño (1968); Los años pasan (1985); Camila (1998); La esposa virgen (2005); Contigo sí (2021)

Viviana is a Mexican telenovela produced by Valentín Pimstein for Canal de las Estrellas in 1978.

It is an adaptation of the Venezuelan telenovela El engaño produced in 1968.

== Cast ==
- Lucía Méndez as Viviana Lozano/Carla
- Héctor Bonilla as Jorge Armando Moncada
- Juan Ferrara as Julio Montesinos
- Maricruz Olivier as Gloria Fernandez y Marqués/Cristina
- Carlos Cámara as Don Jesus Villarteaga
- Isabela Corona as Consuelo Hernández viuda Gomez
- Claudio Brook as Don Anselmo Fernando y Marqués
- Rosa Maria Moreno as Beatriz de los Reyes
- Adriana Roel as Delia De Lozano
- Luisa Huertas as Eloisa
- María Fernanda as Mari Loli Moreno
- German Robles as Manuel Lozano
- Emma Roldán as Matilde # 1
- Lily Inclán as Matilde # 2
- Miguel Córcega as Don Gerardo Aparisio
- Javier Marc as El Gordo
- Raquel Olmedo as Sonia
- Sara García as Doña Angustias Rubio Montesinos
- Miguel Palmer as Jaime Ordones
- Tamara Garina as Vera Sonia's friend
- Beatriz Aguirre as Luz María passenger travels with viviana in the third episode
- Raul Meraz as Dr. Carlos Ibañez Armenta
- Felix Santaella as First doctor treats Gloria after car accident
- Leticia Perdigon as Azafata in the third episode
- Eduardo Alcaraz as Marcelo Mayordomo de los Montesinos
- Raymundo Capetillo as Alfonso Cernuda
- Héctor Cruz as Inspector Manzanos
- Alicia Encinas as Clara Montesinos
- Ada Carasco as Rosa
- Rafael Banquells as Doctor Navas
- Flor Trujillo as Isabela
- Arturo Benavides as Jefe de policia
- Gaston Tuset as Padre Raul
- Carlos Monden as Ing. Manzor Accountant
- Antonio Edwards as Mozo del hotel
- Arturo Lorca as Mozo del hotel
- Alicia Bonet as Paty
- Antonio Medellín as Roberto modeling Academy Employee
- Maricruz Nájera as enfermera de Beatriz en la clinica psichiatrica
- Mauricio Ferrari as Enrique the maitre of the Marqués' s restaurant
- Antonio Brillas as Doctor Andres Montiel
- Fernando Borges as Ten.Sosaya
- Miguel Angel Negrete as socio de Esteban quien lo defrauda.
- Mercedes Pascual as Benigna
- Rafael del Rio as Juan Manuel Leon
- Roberto Ballesteros as José Aparisio
- Manuel Guizar as Choffer Juan de los Montesinos
- Patricio Castillo as Choffer Pedro de los Marqués
