= Apasionada (Argentine TV series) =

1993 Argentine telenovela

Apasionada is a 1993 Argentine telenovela produced by Televisa for Canal 13. It is a remake of the Chilean telenovela La Colorina.

== Cast ==
- Susu Pecoraro – "Dolores Nelson"
- Dario Grandinetti – "Patricio Velasco"
- Carlos Estrada – "Francisco Velasco"
- Andrea Bonelli – "Martha Suárez"
- Pablo Brichta – "Benigno Rios"
- Alejandra da Passano – "Annie Guzmán"
- Mauricio Dayub – "Martin Pelayo"
- Oscar Ferreiro – "Nicolas Estévez" y "Rodolfo"
- Susana Lanteri – "Etelvina"
- Ernesto Larresse – "Fabián"
- Claribel Medina – "Betina"
- Boy Olmi – "Enrique"
- Carola Reyna – "Claudia"
- Veronica Ruano – "Ines"
- Gabriela Toscano – "Rosarito"
- Tony Vilas – "Joaquin"
- Sandra Dominguez – "Liliana"
- Maria Rosa Fugazot – "Julia"
- Elena Perez Rueda – "Margarita"
- Victor Hugo Vieyra - "Octavio Velasco"
