= Dimitrios Sarrás =

Greek actor and theater director

- Born: 1927; Greece
- Died: 1983 (aged 55–56); Mexico City, Mexico
- Other names: Dimitrio Sarrás, Dimitrius Sarras
- Occupations: Stage actor and director

James Dimitrios Sarrás León (1927–1983), sometimes hispanicized as Dimitrio Sarrás or Dimitrius Sarrás, was a Greek actor and theater director who spent the last decades of his life working in Mexico, where he also founded an acting school and directed several telenovelas.

Sarrás was born in Greece but emigrated with his parents to the United States just before the outbreak of World War II. In New York City he attended the Actors Studio, a prominent acting school directed by Lee Strasberg and Elia Kazan. He returned briefly to Greece and then moved to Mexico in the 1960s, where he lived for some time with Norwegian actress and photographer Eva Norvind.

Although Sarrás arrived in Mexico as an actor, he soon moved to acting instruction and stage direction. He taught at the National Autonomous University's Center for Theater (Centro Universitario de Teatro) and founded a studio specialized in method acting at Colonia Roma in Mexico City, which he later relocated to La Condesa. Among his most notable alumni were actresses Maricruz Olivier —with whom he forged a close friendship,— Beatriz Sheridan and María Teresa Rivas.

Sarrás staged several plays in the capital city with the National Theater Company (Compañía Nacional de Teatro) and started directing telenovelas for Televisa in the early 1970s; first Ana del aire (1973), followed by Rina (1977), Viviana (1978) and Colorina (1980), among others.

He died in Mexico City in 1983 from a myocardial infarction. After his death, actress Adriana Roel overtook the operation of his studio.

== Telenovelas ==
Year	Title
1973	Ana del aire
1977	Rina
1978	Viviana
1980	Colorina
1981	Otra vuelta de tuerca
1981	El hogar que yo robé
1982	Vanessa
