= Colorina (Peruvian TV series) =

2017 Peruvian telenovela

- Also known as: Colorina: Madre por siempre
- Genre: Telenovela
- Based on: La Colorina by Arturo Moya Grau
- Written by: Eduardo Adrianzén, Jimena Ortiz de Zevallos, Rogger Vergara Adrianzén, Esteban Philipps
- Story by: Víctor Falcón, Eduardo Adrianzén
- Starring: Magdyel Ugaz; David Villanueva
- Theme music composer: Juan Carlos Fernández
- Opening theme: See below
- Country of origin: Peru
- Original language: Spanish
- No. of seasons: 2
- No. of episodes: 103

Production
- Executive producer: Michelle Alexander
- Camera setup: Multi-camera
- Production company: Del Barrio Producciones

Original release
- Network: América Televisión
- Release: September 26, 2017 – February 19, 2018

Related
- Colorina

Colorina is a Peruvian telenovela produced by Michelle Alexander for América Televisión, based on the 1980 Mexican drama of the same name produced by Valentín Pimstein for Televisa. It stars Magdyel Ugaz and David Villanueva as the titular character.

The first season consists of 54 episodes, and from the second season on, the telenovela was renamed Colorina: Madre por siempre.

== Plot ==
Colorina (Fernanda) works in a nightclub as a prostitute with her great friend Lupita (Muñeca Montiel). Both arrive at the mansion of Luis Carlos invited by Ivan, a sponger who is brother-in-law of Luis Carlos Villamore. Colorina and Luis Carlos had met before and fall in love, but their relation is not well seen by the cold and calculating mother of Luis Carlos, Matilde. Diana, the wife of Luis Carlos, is terminally ill and can not have children. Luis Carlos and Colorina start an affair and accidentally she becomes pregnant with a son. Luis Carlos wants to help Colorina and she moves to his family house. Matilde tries to still the baby from Fernanda but she manages to run away with the help of Lupita and her lover Homero. At the same time, Bertha, the maid in service of the Villamore house leaves her husband Pancho and her two children, who are actually Ivan's. With the consent of Pancho, Colorina decides to take the two children to confuse the mother of Luis Carlos and escapes to Piura.

== Episodes ==
| Season | Episodes | | Originally released | |
| Season | Episodes | | First released | Last released |
|---|---|---|---|---|
| 1 | 103 | 53 | September 26, 2017 | December 11, 2017 |
| 1 | 103 | 49 | December 8, 2017 | February 19, 2018 |

== Cast ==
- Magdyel Ugaz as Colorina
- David Villanueva as Luis Carlos
- Claudio Calmet as Panchito
- Malory Vargas es Orfelinda
- Christian Domínguez es Aquiles
- Nicolás Fantinato as Ramiro
- Bruno Odar as Rogelio
- Jimena Lindo como Esterlina
- Stephanie Orué as Berta
- Juan Carlos Rey de Castro as Iván
- Gonzalo Molina como Homero
- Carlos Casella como Gérard
- Natalia Torres como Matilde

== Reception ==
The telenovela has received several negative and positive criticism from the Peruvian audience. According to Kantar Ibope the telenovela debuted with a total of 21.3 million viewers, becoming the most watched in their schedule.

== Music ==
Track listing

| No. | Title | Length |
|---|---|---|
| 1. | "Colorina" (Marcos Llunas) | 3:29 |
| 2. | "Tú me haces falta" (Reyna and Rommy Marcovich) | 3:16 |
