= Enrique Hidalgo =

Venezuelan musician (born 1942)

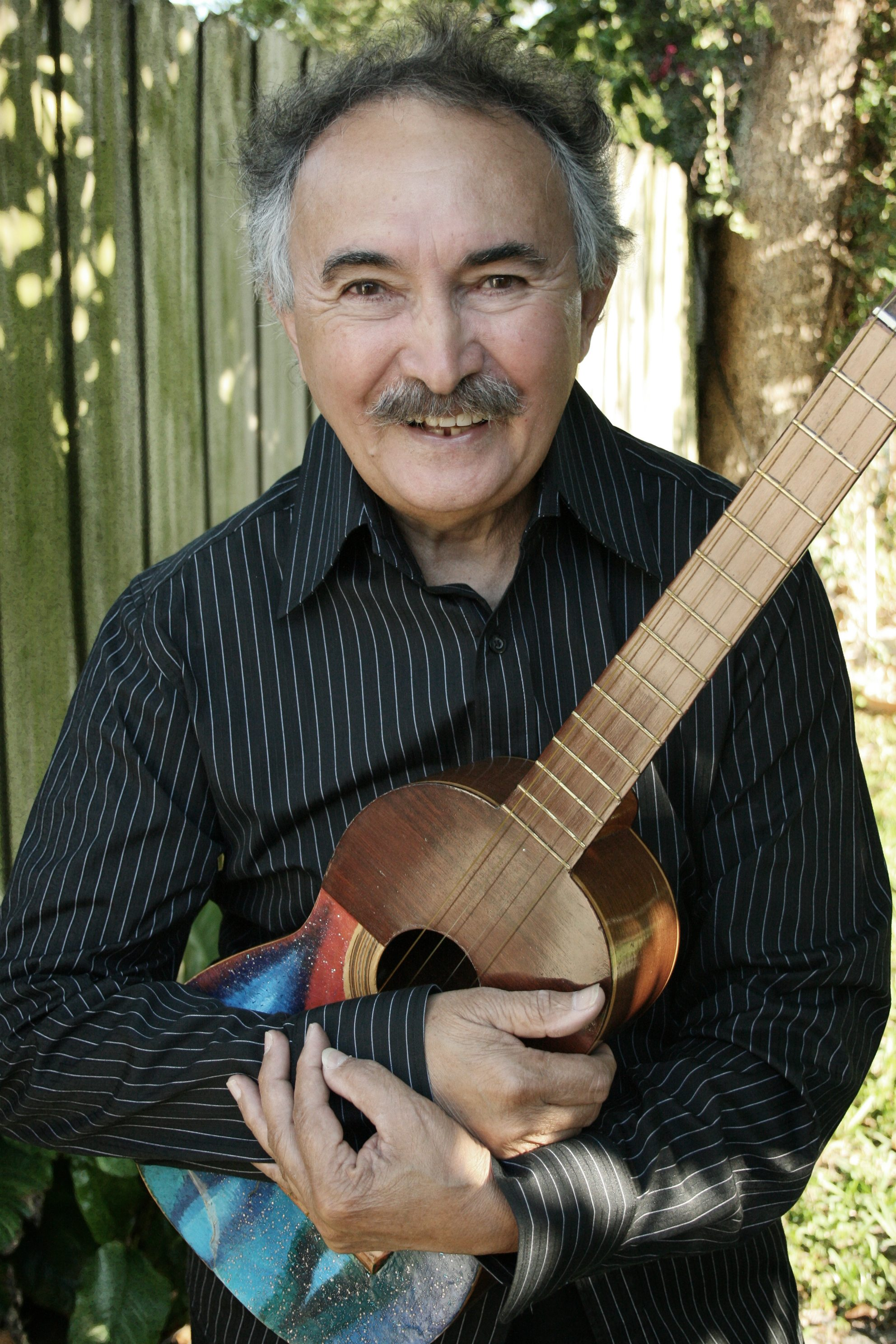
Enrique Hidalgo

Enrique Hidalgo (born March 10, 1942, in El Tigre, Anzoátegui, Venezuela) is a musician and author.
