= Brest State Technical University =

Public university in Brest, Belarus

Coordinates: 52°05′N 23°45′E

Brest State Technical University– BrSTU
- Брестский государственный технический университет (БрГТУ)
- Type: Public
- Established: April 1, 1966
- Rector: Sergey Kasperovich .
- Students: 12,000
- Address: 224017, Moskovskaya str., 267, Brest, Belarus
- Website: www.bstu.by

Brest State Technical University s situated in Brest, Belarus. It began as Brest State Civil Engineering Institute on April 1, 1966, that was reorganized into Brest State Polytechnic Institute in 1989 and eventually into a university in 2000.

== History ==
April 1, 1966 (official date of foundation) — Brest Institute of Civil Engineering.

- In 1967 — Faculty of Civil Engineering and Architecture.
- In 1969 — Agricultural and evening faculties.
- In 1971 — Hydro-reclamation faculty.
- In 1988 — the opening of electronic profile specialties.
- In 1989 — was renamed the Brest Polytechnic Institute.
- February 1, 1995 — Faculty of Economics.
- In 2000, the Brest Polytechnic Institute was reorganized into the Brest State Technical University.
- In 2005 — Faculty of Electronic Information Systems (FEIS).
- In 2020, a full-time military department was opened.

=== 2020-2021 ===
On 21 June 2021, Aliaksandr Bakhanovich, Rector of the Brest State Technical University, was added to the sanctions list of the European Union. According to the official decision of the EU, "In his position as the Rector of the Brest State Technical University, whose appointment was approved by Alexander Lukashenka, Aliaksandr Bakhanovich is responsible for the decision of University administration to expel students for taking part in peaceful protests. The expulsion orders were taken following Lukashenka's call on 27 October 2020 for expelling from universities students taking part in protests and strikes. Bakhanovich is therefore responsible for the repression of civil society and is supporting the Lukashenka regime."
