= Julio Martínez (journalist) =

Chilean journalist (1923–2008)

Julio Martínez Prádanos (Temuco, Chile, June 23, 1923 – Santiago, Chile, January 2, 2008) was a Chilean sports commentator specializing in football who had a long career in the written press, radio and television. He won the 1995 National Prize for Journalism, awarded by the Chilean Ministry of Education. He belongs to a generation of ever-lasting emblematic Chilean sports commentators, along with Sergio Livingstone, Pedro Carcuro, Alberto Fouillioux, Néstor Isella and Milton Millas.

Martínez died of terminal prostate cancer on January 2, 2008, after years of failing health.

== Tributes ==
=== Living ===
- 1982: The football club Julio Martínez was established in Rancagua.
- 1987: In the remodeling of the Estadio Santa Laura in Santiago, the press gallery is named after the journalist.
- 2005: A gym in the commune of Cerro Navia in Santiago is named after the commentator.

=== Posthumous ===
- January 4, 2008:
  - Through his life, Martínez was an avid supporter of Unión Española. After his death, Santa Laura street, where the club's stadium is placed, was renamed Julio Martínez Prádanos by decision of the Municipalidad of Independencia.
  - The Government of Chile proposed that the Estadio Nacional de Chile be renamed the Estadio Nacional Julio Martínez Prádanos, it was approved soon after.
