= UTE TV 11 =

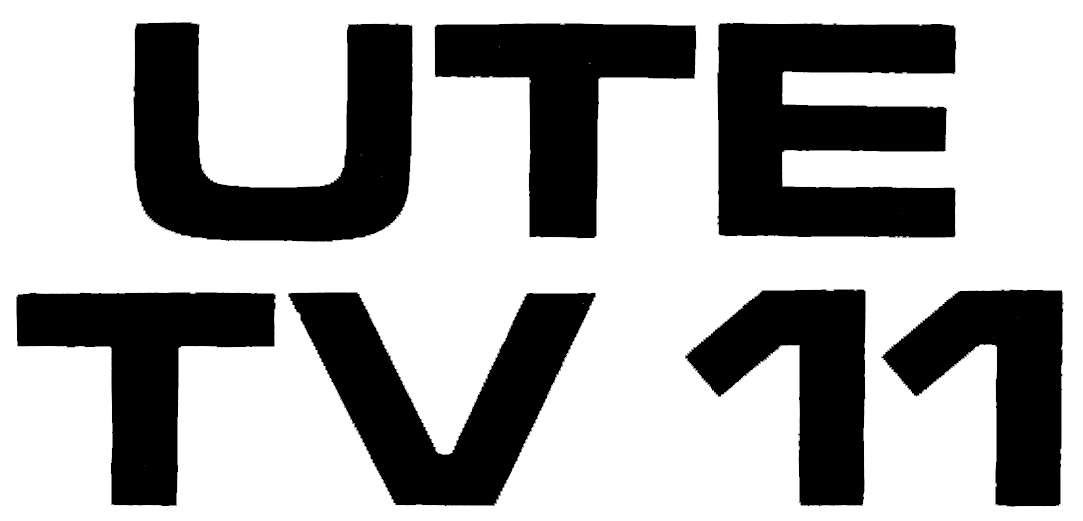
- Country: Chile

Programming
- Language: Spanish

Ownership
- Owner: Universidad Técnica del Estado

History
- Launched: 17 September 1973; 52 years ago (aborted)

Availability

Terrestrial
- Santiago: Channel 11 (aborted)

UTE TV 11 was a project of a television channel in Chile developed in 1973 by the State Technical University (UTE) and it was planned to air during the spring of that year, however it was unable to start broadcasting due to the coup d'état of September 11.

== History ==
The first attempts by the State Technical University to have a television channel date back to 1961, when an ad-referendum contract was signed with Radio Minería to be able to obtain the necessary equipment to operate a television station that would broadcast the Cup matches. World Cup that would take place in Chile in 1962. The initiative failed after the Ministry of the Interior refused to provide facilities to the UTE to carry out said project, considering that the association with a radio station would become a commercial television company, which was not allowed by the government at that time.

At the end of 1966 and beginning of 1967, the UTE's efforts to have its own television channel were again mentioned in the specialized press; Ecran magazine indicated that it was planned to air on channel 7 and that among the names that were evaluated as possible directors were Germán Vidal and Isidoro Bassis. The government of Eduardo Frei Montalva continued with the denials that the administration of Jorge Alessandri.

After the victory of Salvador Allende in the presidential election of September 4, 1970, the government of Frei Montalva placed great urgency on the bill—introduced to the National Congress in 1969 by the Christian Democratic Party (PDC)—that created Televisión Nacional de Chile and the National Television Council. The initiative also authorized only the three universities that already had channels – Universidad de Chile, Católica de Valparaíso and Católica de Chile – to establish and operate television channels. During the discussion, the Unidad Popular (UP) proposed through an indication that the UTE and the University of Concepción (UdeC) could also have television stations; At that time, both universities had militant UP rectors: Enrique Kirberg (PC) at the UTE and Edgardo Enríquez (PR) at the UdeC. However, citing economic arguments, the National Party (PN) and the PDC rejected the proposal, although there was also opposition for political reasons, as explained by PN Senator Francisco Bulnes when rejecting the indication in the Commission of Government, when it stated that a channel in the hands of the UTE "would be placed at the service of a certain trend". The bill was finally enacted on October 21—two weeks before Allende took office as president of Chile - and came into effect three days later. In this way, UTE and other universities were excluded from being able to create and operate television channels.

=== Development ===
Despite the regulations, the television channel project of the State Technical University continued and was definitively developed starting in 1971 under the aegis of the Film and TV Section of the UTE, which was in charge of the Department of Communications. of the UTE, which in turn depended on the Secretariat of Extension and Communications of the university. Among the people who were part of the UTE Channel 11 project were Ricardo Núñez Muñoz, Sergio Ortega —who according to Núñez had been proposed to be director of the station— Alejandro Lillo—who was going to take over as art director—10 and Fernando Balmaceda.

In April 1973, the written press reported that the launch of "Teleonce" was planned for the following month, a new channel of the University of Chile that would broadcast on channel 11 to replace channel 9, which had been taken over by its workers since January 19. In response to this, the Superintendency of Electrical, Gas and Telecommunications Services (Segtel) denounced that the airing of Teleonce would be illegal, and on April 6 authorized experimental transmissions for six months for a channel of the State Technical University (UTE) that would occupy said frequency (11). The authorities of the University of Chile denounced that said measure was illegal, since the legislation authorized exclusively the universities of Chile, Católica de Chile and Católica de Valparaíso - in addition to Televisión Nacional de Chile - to operate television channels,14 which was reaffirmed by the National Television Council on April 18. Through press releases and advertisements under the slogan "New educational vision", the UTE defended its right to own and operate a television channel.

According to Ricardo Núñez, in September 1973 the channel's antenna was already installed on Ricardo Cumming Street, and the inauguration of the station would have been scheduled for the 17th of the same month, on the occasion of the Tedeum de Fiestas Patrias; at the beginning of September, the newspaper La Segunda reported that the recordings of the programs that would air on channel 11 had begun in the Protab studios. After the University of Chile recovered channel 9 after the eviction of its facilities on September 8 as a result of an agreement between the State Technical University (UTE), the Television Corporation of the University of Chile and the unions of Channel 9, it was established that the University of Chile should choose with which channel (and, therefore, with which personnel) would stay - with 6 or 9 - and the UTE would be in charge of the other frequency, or choose a different channel. The fall of the government of Salvador Allende frustrated UTE's plans to have its own television channel, since the Military Junta of Augosto Pinochet did not recognize the agreement reached between the universities.

On the campus of the Central House of the State Technical University, a building had been built at the end of 1962 that was intended to house the facilities of UTE TV 11, and which was later occupied by the Computer Center of the house of studies and currently on the Radio of the University of Santiago de Chile.
