= La Colorina =

Chilean telenovela

- Genre: Telenovela
- Screenplay by: Arturo Moya Grau
- Directed by: José Caviedes; Iván Soto; Walter Kliche
- Country of origin: Chile
- Original language: Spanish
- No. of episodes: 88

Production
- Executive producer: Ricardo Miranda
- Producer: Eduardo Domínguez
- Production company: Protab

Original release
- Network: Televisión Nacional de Chile
- Release: 1977

La Colorina ("The Redhead") was a Chilean telenovela created by Arturo Moya Grau (1920-1994) and produced by Protab in 1977 for Televisión Nacional de Chile. It starred Liliana Ross, Patricio Achurra, Violeta Vidaurre and Paz Irarrázabal. It has been remade three times and is the screenwriter's best known work.

In 1980 the Mexican television network Televisa adaptation, Colorina, starred Lucía Méndez. In 1993 an Argentine version was produced entitled Apasionada, with Susú Pecoraro as La Colorina. In 2001 Televisa made a new adaptation called Salomé, starring Edith González.

== Plot ==
First Part

“La Colorina” (Liliana Ross), a woman so-named for the color of her hair, works in a nightclub as a prostitute together with her close friend “La Rata” (Violeta Vidaurre). Together they go to Daniel’s (Patricio Achurra) mansion looking for fun with Iván (Gonzalo Robles), Daniel’s free-loading brother-in-law. La Colorina and Daniel fall in love, however their relationship is not acceptable to Ana María (Paz Irarrázabal), Daniel’s cold and calculating mother.

Alba (Grimanesa Jiménez), Daniel’s wife, can’t have children, so Ana María pays La Colorina to get pregnant with her son and hand the child over once he is born. La Colorina accepts, but she changes her mind when giving birth and flees the city. At the same time, Mirta, La Colorina’s neighbour, leaves her husband, Pejerrey (Arturo Moya Grau), and their two children to become an actress. With Pejerrey’s consent, La Colorina decides to raise her neighbours’ two children to confuse Ana María.

Second part

Years go by, “La Colorina” (Liliana Ross), by now a grown woman, has brought up her son, Fernando (Samuel Villaroel), and Mirta’s children, which she has brought up as her own. Meanwhile, Daniel (Patricio Achurra), now widowed, is still in love with “La Colorina”. His mother (Paz Irarrázabal) still opposed to the relationship, obviously rejects her grandchild.

Ana María also has a conflict with her servant “Chagua” (Ester Mayo), who has always fought for the family, secretly in love with Basilio (Armando Fenoglio), Ana María’s husband, and loving Daniel as if he were her own son.

“La Colorina”, always accompanied by “La Rata” (Violeta Vidaurre), manages the establishment where she used to work. Franco (Mario Bustos), one of her sons, falls in love with Cristina (Soledad Pérez); proposes to her and she accepts, since she is noble and has a good heart.

When Mirta (Alicia Villablanca) returns to take her children back, “Pejerrey” (Arturo Moya Grau), still in love with her, agrees to tell the truth, but they don’t get back together.

== Cast ==
- Liliana Ross as Luciana Álvarez "La Colorina".
- Patricio Achurra as Daniel Latorre.
- Paz Irarrázabal as Ana María de Latorre.
- Armando Fenoglio as Basilio Latorre.
- Violeta Vidaurre as Rita "La Rata".
- Gonzalo Robles as Iván.
- Grimanesa Jiménez as Alba.
- Arturo Moya Grau as El Pejerrey.
- Sergio Urrutia as El Lagrimita.
- Ester Mayo as La Chagua.
- Yoya Martínez as La Caperucita.
- Alicia Villablanca as Mirta.
- Roberto Poblete as Richard.
- Alberto Vega as Bernardo.
- Frankie Bravo cas Matías.
- Eduardo Baldani as Enrique.
- Fernando Morales as Dr. Ulloa.
- Coca Guazzini as Marcia.
- Soledad Pérez as Cristina.
- Mario Bustos as Franco.
- Gonzalo Álvarez as Gabriel.
- Samuel Villarroel as Fernando.
- Teresa Berríos as Luzmira.
- Ana María Palma as Lucía
- Nelson Brodt

== Fact Sheet ==
- Year: 1977
- Executive Producer: Eduardo Domínguez
- Screenwriter: Arturo Moya Grau
- Director: José Caviedes / Iván Soto
- Production Company: Protab
- Set Designer: Walter Kliche
- Cameramen: Ernesto Riquelme / Nelson Valdivia
- Nº Episodes: 88, 60 minutes each.

== Versions ==
- Colorina produced in 1980 with great success by Valentín Pimstein for Televisa starring Lucía Méndez and Enrique Álvarez Félix.
- Apasionada produced in 1993 for Televisa Argentina by Canal 13 and starring Susú Pecoraro and Darío Grandinetti.
- Salomé produced in 2001 by Juan Osorio for Televisa and starring Edith González and Guy Ecker.
- Colorina, a Peruvian version of the Mexican telenovela (1980) produced in 2017 by Michelle Alexander for América Televisión starring Magdyel Ugaz and David Villanueva.
