= Marta Blanco =

Chilean writer and journalist (1938–2020)

- Born: 1938
- Died: 21 April 2020 (aged 81–82)
- Occupations: Writer, journalist
- Spouse: Enrique Lafourcade

Marta Blanco (1938–2020), was a Chilean writer and journalist.

== Early life ==
Blanco was born in Viña del Mar.

== Personal life ==
Blanco was married to Pedro Blanco. She was his second wife and they were together for seven years. He had been married to Chilean-born Canadian artist Maria Luisa Segnoret and he went on to marry Chilean painter Rossana Pizarro Garcia.

== Books ==
- The Generation Of The Leaves, Zig-Zag, 1965.
- Everything Is A Lie, Editora Brocal, 1974 – contains 13 stories,
  1. Bluegirl
  2. The disappearance of Eleodoro
  3. Gath & Chávez
  4. Golden wedding
  5. The general's feast
  6. Roast chickens
  7. A paper crown
  8. Motel
  9. The artist consoled
  10. Presence
  11. Maternity
  12. Optical One: She thought she was thinking about it
  13. Optics two: Mirage
- For The Left Hand, Caos Ediciones, 1990; contains 12 stories,
  1. Japanese Towels
  2. Fueguina
  3. Chu Yuan's iniquities
  4. Walk
  5. Flatterer
  6. Moon that breaks
  7. Dark honeysuckle affair
  8. The Lord have mercy on Schtodt
  9. The saccade of the nuns
  10. The representative of the fourth part of the universe
  11. By Eye
  12. Interrogation by chosen people who know
- Maradentro, Alfaguara, Santiago, 1997.
- La Emperrada, Alfaguara, Santiago, 2001.
- Whale Memory, Uqbar, Santiago, 2009

== Awards ==
- Story Contest of the magazine Paula 1975.
- Story Contest of the magazine Paula 1980.
- Cuentos de El Mercurio Award 1995.
- Tales of El Mercurio Award 1997.
- Erotic Tales Award 2005 (Caras magazine).
- Critics Award 2009 (Círculo de Críticos de Arte de Chile) for Memory of whales .
