= Catholic University of the North =

University in Chile

Universidad Católica del Norte
- Universidad Católica del Norte
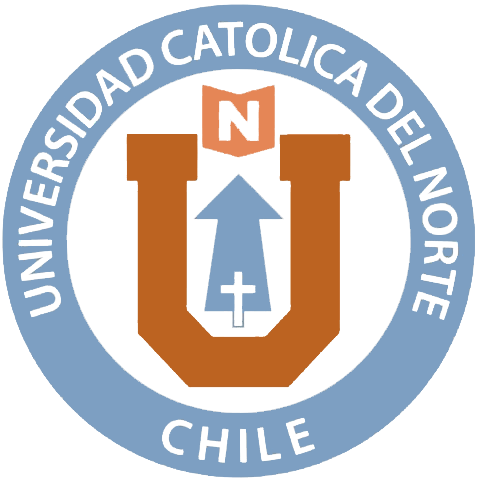
- Motto: Ver más allá
- Type: Traditional
- Established: 1956
- Students: 10,921 (2020)
- Undergraduates: 10,634
- Postgraduates: 287
- Location: Antofagasta, Antofagasta Province, Chile; 23.681°S 70.410°W
- Website: www.ucn.cl

Catholic University of the North (Spanish: Universidad Católica del Norte (UCN)) is a university in Chile. It is part of the Chilean Traditional Universities. It is located in Antofagasta, Chile. The Catholic University of the North was founded on May 31, 1956.

The current rector is Rodrigo Alda Varas.

== Organization ==
The Catholic University of Norte has 7 faculties, 20 departments, 8 schools, 3 institutes, 7 research centres and a Scientific and Technological Park that are situated in four main locations:

- Campus Casa Central in Antofagasta
- Campus Guayacán in Coquimbo
- Museum and research centre in San Pedro de Atacama
- Sierra Vicuña Mackenna, Taltal (for astronomy purposes)

Other locations:

- Center of MBA de la facultad de economía y administración, Calama
- Oficinas Santiago (Representación ante el DEMRE y postulaciones)
- Departamento de Clínicas - Facultad de Medicina
  - Al interior del Hospital San Pablo de Coquimbo
  - Frente al Hospital San Juan de Dios de La Serena

Museums:

- Museo Geológico Professor Humberto Fuenzalida V.
- Museo Arqueológico R. P. Gustavo Le Paige de San Pedro de Atacama
- Museo del Desierto de Atacama, Sector ruinas de Huanchaca (Alianza Enjoy-UCN Bicentenario)

Technical Training Centers:

- Centro de Educación y Capacitación de la Universidad Católica del Norte (CeducUCN)
  - Sedes Coquimbo (Casa Central), Antofagasta y Lebu.

== Faculties and Educational Programs ==
- Facultad de Ciencias
  - Pregrado
    - Carrera de Química y Farmacia
    - Carrera de Licenciatura en Física. Mención en Astronomía
    - Carrera de Licenciatura en Matemática
    - Carrera de Química Ambiental - Química en Metallurgia Extractiva
    - Carrera de Analista Químico
    - Carrera de Licenciatura en Química
  - Postgrado
    - Magíster en Ciencias Mención en Matemáticas
    - Doctorado en Ciencias Mención en Matemáticas
- Facultad de Humanidades
  - Carrera de Periodismo
  - Carrera de Psicología
  - Carrera de Pedagogía en Ingles y/o Traducción Bilingüe
- Escuela de Derecho
- Escuela de Arquitectura
  - Pregrado
    - Carrera de Arquitectura
  - Postgrado
    - Magíster en Arquitectura
- Facultad de Ciencias del Mar
- Facultad de Economía y Administración
- Facultad de Ingeniería y Ciencias Geológicas
  - Pregrado
    - Carrera de Geología
    - Carrera de Ingeniería Civil en Computación e Informática
    - Carrera de Ingeniería Civil Industrial
    - Carrera de Ingeniería Civil Metallurgia
    - Carrera de Ingeniería Civil Química
    - Carrera de Ingeniería Ejecución en Computación e Informática
    - Carrera de Ingeniería Ejecución en Procesos Químicos
    - Carrera de Ingeniería Ejecución en Metallurgia
    - Carrera de Ingeniería Civil Ambiental
  - Postgrado
    - Magíster en Geología Económica. Mención Exploración
    - Magíster en Applicaciones de Ingeniería Ambiental
    - Programa de Doctorado en Ciencias. Mención Geología
- Facultad Ciencias de Ingeniería y Construcción
  - Carrera de Ingeniería en Construcción
  - Carrera de Ingeniería Civil

== See also ==
- University homepage (in Spanish)
