= 2nd TVyNovelas Awards =

1984 Mexican TV awards

- Date: 1984
- Location: Mexico City, Mexico

Highlights
- Most awards: El maleficio (7)
- Most nominations: El maleficio (14)

Television/radio coverage
- Network: Canal de las Estrellas

The 2nd TVyNovelas Awards were an academy of special awards to the best soap operas and TV shows. The awards ceremony took place in 1984 in Mexico City.

El maleficio won 7 awards, the most for the evening. Other winners Bodas de odio won 4 awards, including Best Telenovela, and Bianca Vidal won 1 award.

== Summary of awards and nominations ==
Telenovela	Nominations	Awards
El maleficio	14	7
Bodas de odio	9	4
Bianca Vidal	1	1
El amor ajeno	1	0
En busca del paraíso	1	0

== Winners and nominees ==
=== Telenovelas ===
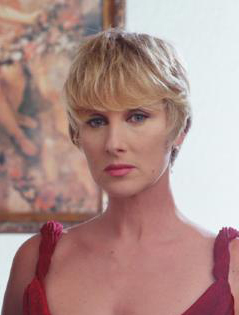
Christian Bach, winner for Best Actress.

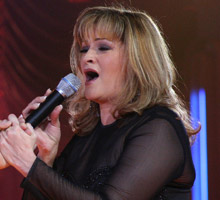
Rocío Banquells, winner for Best Antagonist Actress.

Best Telenovela	Best Production
Bodas de odio; El maleficio; En busca del paraíso	Ernesto Alonso – Bodas de odio
Best Actress	Best Actor
Christian Bach – Bodas de odio; Jacqueline Andere – El maleficio; Norma Herrera – El maleficio	Ernesto Alonso – El maleficio; Frank Moro – Bodas de odio; Miguel Palmer – Bodas de odio
Best Antagonist Actress	Best Antagonist Actor
Rocío Banquells – Bianca Vidal; Rosario Gálvez – Bodas de odio; Úrsula Prats – El amor ajeno	Humberto Zurita – El maleficio; Rafael Sánchez Navarro – Bodas de odio; Sergio Jiménez – El maleficio
Best Female Revelation	Best Male Revelation
Julieta Egurrola – Bodas de odio; Erika Buenfil – El maleficio; Rebecca Jones – El maleficio	Sergio Goyri – El maleficio; Antonio Valencia – Bodas de odio; Eduardo Yáñez – El maleficio

=== Other Awards ===
Best Debut Actress	Best Debut Actor
Rebecca Jones – El maleficio	Eduardo Yáñez – El maleficio
Best Child Actress	Best Child Actor
Ana Patricia Rojo – El maleficio	Armando Araiza – El maleficio

=== Comedy and Variety Programs ===
Best Comedy Program	Best Variety Program
Cachún cachún ra ra!	Siempre en domingo
Best Comedy Actress	Best Comedy Actor
Lupita Sandoval – Venustiana	Gualberto Castro – La carabina de Ambrosio
Revelation as a Hostess	Revelation as a Singer
Marcela Páez – XE-TU	Daniela Romo
