= Si Dios me quita la vida =

- Genre: Telenovela; Romance; Drama
- Created by: Marissa Garrido
- Written by: María Zarattini; Vittoria Zarattini
- Directed by: Jorge Fons; Enrique Lizalde
- Starring: Daniela Romo; César Évora; Enrique Lizalde; Omar Fierro; Rafael Rojas; Adriana Roel; Luis Felipe Tovar
- Theme music composer: Luis Demetrio; Bebu Silvetti
- Opening theme: Si Dios me quita la vida by Daniela Romo
- Ending theme: Voy by Daniela Romo
- Country of origin: Mexico
- Original language: Spanish
- No. of episodes: 125

Production
- Executive producers: Pedro Damián; Juan Osorio
- Production locations: Filming; Televisa San Ángel; Mexico City, Mexico; Location; Mérida, Yucatán; Veracruz
- Cinematography: Carlos Sánchez Zúñiga; Juan Carlos Frutos
- Running time: 21-22 minutes
- Production company: Televisa

Original release
- Network: Canal de las Estrellas
- Release: February 20 – August 11, 1995

Related
- La leona (1961); Una mujer marcada (1979); A leona (1982); La leona (2016)

Si Dios me quita la vida (English title: If God takes away my life) is a Mexican telenovela produced by Pedro Damián and Juan Osorio for Televisa in 1995. This is a remake of the 1961 telenovela La leona starred by Amparo Rivelles and Ernesto Alonso.

Daniela Romo and César Évora starred as protagonists, while Omar Fierro and Alma Muriel starred as antagonists.

== Plot ==
María Sánchez Amaro is a woman from a wealthy family, educated in the moral habits of the 20s, whose live revolves around three men: Alfredo, the seducer, whom she married and procreate a child; Enrico, mature man, noble and protector, with whom she formed a second marriage; and Antonio, who teaches her the promise of true love.

After suffering abuse and betrayal by Alfredo, she is alone with her daughter when he goes to jail. She goes forward with his beautiful voice, but when he was released he returns to harass, María falls into the arms of Enrico, captivated by his love and goodness, and therein lies the love and protection that she has always yearned.

Antonio then appears, as a man who received protection from Enrico when he fled his country, accused of a crime he did not commit. Enrico does not only work but also gave him the same affection that he gave his own son. Antonio falls madly in love with the wife of the man who most wants and respects, and she does, too, although both try to resist this tormented and impossible love.

== Cast ==
Actor	Character
Daniela Romo	María Sánchez Amaro
César Évora	Antonio Foscari
Enrique Lizalde	Enrico de Marchi
Omar Fierro	Alfredo Román
Rafael Rojas	Francesco de Marchi
Adriana Roel	Doña Fedora Foscari
Luis Felipe Tovar	Gregorio "Goyo" Jiménez
Julieta Egurrola	Antonieta Vidal
Martha Ofelia Galindo	Gilda
Alonso Echánove	Tomás Esquivel
José Elías Moreno	Raúl Guevara
Karyme Lozano	Esther "Teté" Román Sánchez
Blanca Guerra	Virginia Hernández
Fernando Balzaretti	Santiago Hernández
Wendy de los Cobos	Dinorah Moreno
Alma Muriel	Eva de Sánchez Amaro/de Hernández
Gustavo Rojo	Don Jesús Sánchez Amaro
Tiaré Scanda	Rosario
Amparo Garrido	Griselda
Renée Varsi	Lucía
Juan Carlos Colombo	Teniente Pablo García
Jorge Poza	Claudio
Jesús Ochoa	León
Kala Ruiz	Rosita
Plutarco Haza	Hugo
Alan Fierro	
Roberto Miquel	
Martha Mariana Castro	
Andrea Noli	
María Dolores Oliva	
Mario Prudom	
Lucía Paillés	
Juan Carlos Barreto	
Raúl Azkenazi	
Alec Von Bargen	
Ilean Almaguer	
Minerva Padilla	
Gustavo Munguía	
Ricardo Vera	
Alfredo Gutiérrez	
Enrique Borja Baena	

== Awards ==
Year	Award	Category	Nominee	Result
1996	14th TVyNovelas Awards	Best Leading Actor	Enrique Lizalde	Won
1996	14th TVyNovelas Awards	Best Supporting Actor	Rafael Rojas	Nominated
1996	14th TVyNovelas Awards	Best Decor	Sandra Cortés	Won
