= Secreto de confesión =

Secreto de confesión may refer to:

- Secreto de confesión (film), the first Filipino film in the Spanish language
- Secreto de confesión (1965 TV series), a Mexican telenovela
- Secreto de confesión (1980 TV series), a Mexican telenovela
