= Encadenados (1988 TV series) =

Mexican telenovela

- Genre: Telenovela; Romance; Drama
- Created by: Marissa Garrido
- Based on: Emily Brontë
- Directed by: Julio Castillo
- Starring: Christian Bach; Humberto Zurita; Sergio Jiménez; Julieta Rosen; Raquel Olmedo; Macaria; Miguel Ángel Ferriz; Leonardo Daniel
- Theme music composer: Bebu Silvetti
- Opening theme: Piano
- Country of origin: Mexico
- Original language: Spanish
- No. of episodes: 180

Production
- Executive producer: Ernesto Alonso
- Production locations: Tabasco, Mexico; Chiapas, Mexico
- Running time: 21–22 minutes
- Production company: Televisa

Original release
- Network: Canal de las Estrellas
- Release: August 8, 1988 – April 14, 1989

Related
- El pecado de Oyuki; Lo blanco y lo negro

Encadenados (English title: Notorious) is a Mexican telenovela produced by Ernesto Alonso for Televisa in 1988. Its original story of Marissa Garrido was based on Wuthering Heights by British author Emily Brontë and directed by Julio Castillo.

Christian Bach and Humberto Zurita starred as protagonists, while Sergio Jiménez, Julieta Rosen and Leonardo Daniel starred as antagonists.

== Cast ==
- Christian Bach as Catalina Valdecasas
- Humberto Zurita as Germán
- Sergio Jiménez as Caralampio/José
- Julieta Rosen as Blanca Lazcano
- Raquel Olmedo as Alina
- Macaria as Isabel
- Miguel Ángel Ferriz as Eduardo Valdecasas
- Leonardo Daniel as Daniel Lazcano
- Marcela de Galina as Alejandra
- Tony Bravo as Carlos Montes
- Gabriela Goldsmith as Iris
- Arturo Benavides as Arnaldo
- Malena Doria as Bertha
- Fernando Moncada as Manuel
- María Montaño as Adela Lazcano
- Teo Tapia as Gilberto Lazcano
- César Adrián Sánchez as Toño
- Jorge Mondragón as Dr. Castellanos
- Julieta Egurrola as Jacinta
- María Eugenia Ríos as Natalia
- Alejandro Ruiz as Marcos
- Nailea Norvind as Mariela
- Graciela Döring as Felipa
- Bruno Rey as Alejandro Valdecasas
- María Marcela as Alejandra
- Fabiola Elenka Tapia as Catalina (child)
- Raúl Castro as Germán (child)
- Rafael Omar as Daniel (child)
- Farid Kuri as Eduardo (child)
- Renata de los Ríos as Blanca (child)
- Arturo Benavides as Arnaldo
- Aurora Medina as Aurelia
- Josafat Luna as Luis Alberto

== Awards ==
Year	Award	Category	Nominee	Result
1989	7th TVyNovelas Awards	Best Telenovela of the Year	Ernesto Alonso	Nominated
1989	7th TVyNovelas Awards	Best Actress	Christian Bach	Won
1989	7th TVyNovelas Awards	Best Actor	Humberto Zurita	Won
1989	7th TVyNovelas Awards	Best Antagonist Actor	Sergio Jiménez	Nominated
