= Nuevo amanecer =

- Genre: Telenovela; Romance; Drama
- Created by: Carmen Daniels
- Based on: Fernanda Villeli
- Written by: Carmen Daniels; Tere Medina
- Directed by: Alfredo Gurrola
- Starring: Jacqueline Andere; Pedro Armendáriz, Jr. Blanca Guerra; Daniela Castro; Salma Hayek; Raúl Araiza
- Opening theme: Amarte así by Jerardo
- Country of origin: Mexico
- Original language: Spanish

Production
- Executive producer: Ernesto Alonso
- Cinematography: Carlos Guerra Villareal
- Running time: 41-44 minutes
- Production company: Televisa

Original release
- Network: Canal de las Estrellas
- Release: October 3, 1988 – January 13, 1989

Nuevo amanecer (New dawn) is a Mexican telenovela produced by Ernesto Alonso for Televisa in 1988.

Jacqueline Andere and Pedro Armendáriz, Jr. starred as protagonists, while Blanca Guerra starred as antagonist. Daniela Castro, Salma Hayek and Raúl Araiza starred as co-protagonists.

== Plot ==
This is the story of Laura, a beautiful mature, shy and abused by her mother Elena, who works as a school teacher. She lives with a past trauma that occurred in her childhood, she was raped by her stepfather. When her mother dies, Laura inherits her fortune and goes to live with her great friend Norma, who also works with Laura in the high school and Norma has a completely opposite character. Laura decides to take a trip where she meets Gerardo, and she falls in love, but in turn, she suffers because it reminds her of her stepfather’s sexual abuse. But Laura also has to deal with a cruel person that wants to destroy her and has to also deal with the mysterious anonymous person that appears suddenly, and sends letters to Laura indicating that it’s her dead mother who came back to life and back to reality. To worsen the situation, Laura has gotten involved with a married man, Felipe. Felipe finds out about her breast cancer and he hides something so sinister that it will possibly change Laura’s feelings towards him. Find out what happens.

== Cast ==
- Jacqueline Andere as Laura de la Rosa Treviño Montiel
- Pedro Armendáriz, Jr. as Gerardo
- Blanca Guerra as Norma
- Daniela Castro as Patricia Ortiz
- Salma Hayek as Fabiola Ramírez Anthony
- Raúl Araiza as Esteban
- Araceli Aguilar as Amparo Luna
- Roberto Antúnez as Arnulfo
- Jerardo as Manuel
- Norma Lazareno as Marisa Basurto
- Rita Macedo as Elena Vda. de Treviño
- Maristel Molina as Nieves
- Alejandra Morales as Ernestina
- Manuel Ojeda as Samuel Ramírez
- Rebeca Silva as Diana Ortiz
- Héctor Suárez Gomís as Paco Landeros
- Gilberto Trujillo as Luis
- Eduardo Liñán as Felipe
- Teresa Velázquez as Gladys Anthony
- Flor Trujillo as Elizabeth Sheldan
- Guillermo Aguilar as Javier Maldonado
- Graciela Döring as Benita
- Dolores Beristáin as Adela
- Fabio Ramírez
- Humberto Elizondo as Aníbal
- Claudia Fernández as Gina
- Marco Hernán as Ángel
- Oscar Traven as Tom Sheldan
- Fabiola Elenka Tapia as Laura Treviño (young)
- Graciela Bernardo as Cora
- Roberto Antúnez
- Enrique Hidalgo as Fabiola's Doctor

== Awards ==
Year	Award	Category	Nominee	Result
1989	7th TVyNovelas Awards	Best Experienced Actress	Jacqueline Andere	Won
1989	7th TVyNovelas Awards	Best Debut Actress	Daniela Castro	Won
1989	7th TVyNovelas Awards	Best Debut Actress	Salma Hayek	Won
