= Mundos opuestos (Mexican TV series) =

- Genre: Telenovela
- Created by: Marissa Garrido; Fernanda Villeli
- Directed by: Carlos David Ortigoza
- Starring: Ernesto Alonso; Rita Macedo
- Country of origin: Mexico
- Original language: Spanish

Production
- Executive producer: Ernesto Alonso
- Production company: Televisa

Original release
- Network: Canal de las Estrellas
- Release: 1976

Mundos opuestos is a Mexican telenovela produced by Ernesto Alonso for Televisa in 1976.

== Cast ==
- Ernesto Alonso as Claudio de la Mora
- Jorge Luke as Luis
- Lucía Méndez as Cecilia
- Rita Macedo as Cristina
- Carmen Montejo as Antonia
- Félix González as Larios
- Arsenio Campos as Alvaro
- Carlos Rotzinguer as García
- Rosa Gloria Chagoyan as Elba
- José Alonso as José Alberto de la Mora
- Ana Martín as Mónica de la Mora
- Anita Blanch as Doña Josefina
- Miguel Palmer as Mario de la Mora
