= Eduardo Yáñez =

Mexican actor (born 1960)

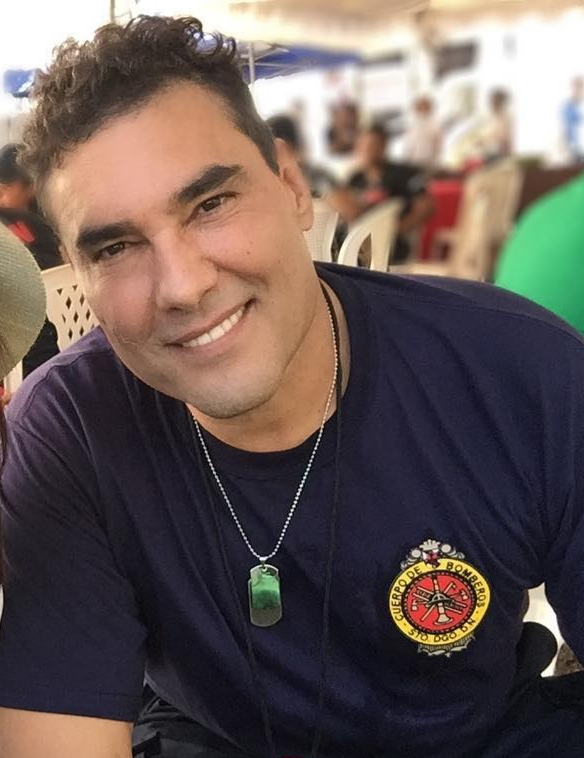
- Yáñez in 2019
- Born: Eduardo Yáñez Luévano; September 25, 1960 (age 66); Mexico City, Mexico
- Occupation: Actor
- Years active: 1981–present
- Spouses: Norma Adriana Garcia (m. 1987; div. 1990) Francesca Cruz (m. 1996; div. 2003)
- Partner(s): Erika Buenfil (2005–2010); Africa Zavala (2015–2018)
- Children: 1

Eduardo Yáñez Luévano (Note: In this Mexican name, the surname is Yáñez and the second or maternal family name is Luévano.) (Spanish pronunciation: [eˈðwaɾðo ˈʝaɲes ˈlweβano]; born September 25, 1960) is a Mexican actor.

== Early life ==
Yáñez was born in Mexico City. He lived with his mother, and has never met his father.

== Career ==
Producer Ernesto Alonso saw Yáñez's potential and gave him his first role in the 1981 soap opera Quiéreme siempre. He played the role of "Carlos" alongside the actress Victoria Ruffo.

In 1991, Yáñez moved to the United States where he worked on two soap operas for Capital Vision, Marielena and Guadalupe. Later, he worked in Hollywood, on movies such as Striptease, Wild Things, and Megiddo. His most recent American movie was The Punisher. He has also worked in television series such as Savannah and Soldier of Fortune. He also worked in Sleeper Cell and Cold Case.

In 2005, after a long absence, Yáñez returned to Mexico and appeared in the soap opera La Verdad Oculta. In 2007, he starred in Destilando Amor, "La Mejor Telenovela del Año", "Best Telenovela of the Year" (Premios TVyNovelas 2008). He played Rodrigo Montalvo Santos and Angélica Rivera played his love interest and portraited Teresa Hernández, also known as "La Gaviota" and Mariana Franco. In 2008, he starred in Fuego En La Sangre, a new version of the Colombian telenovela Pasión de Gavilanes, in which he played the role of Juan Reyes, Franco's older brother (Pablo Montero) and Oscar (Jorge Salinas). In 2009, he starred in the soap opera Corazón salvaje with Aracely Arambula, produced by Salvador Mejía for Televisa. In 2011, he appeared as a Venezuelan politician in an episode of the second season of NCIS: Los Angeles. In 2012, Yáñez appeared in another telenovela for Televisa starring in Amores Verdaderos, in which he played the role of José Ángel Arriaga. In 2015, Yáñez came back to star in the telenovela Amores con trampa, in which he played the role of Facundo Carmona. In 2019, he starred in the motion picture comedy ¡He matado a mi marido! next to Maria Conchita Alonso.

Yáñez has appeared in 8 theatrical plays, 13 soap operas, 33 movies (of which 8 are in English).

== Personal life ==
Yáñez married his first wife, Norma Adriana Garcia, in 1987. They had a son named Eduardo Yáñez Jr. They were divorced three years later.

In 1996, Yáñez married Francesca Cruz, a Cuban-American he met in Miami. They lived in Los Angeles and Miami. In January 2003, they filed for divorce.

== Filmography ==
=== Film ===
Year	Project	Role	Notes
1984	La muerte cruzó el río Bravo	Fernando	
1985	Contrato con la muerte	Fernando	
1985	Narco terror	Roca	
1985	Enemigos a muerte	Jorge	
1986	El maleficio 2: Los enviados del infierno	Profesor Andrés	
1986	Yako, cazador de malditos	José Luis / Yako	
1990	Carrera contra la muerte	Fabián Albarrán	
1994	Wreckage	Camillio	
1996	Striptease	Chico	
1996	Robin Goodfellow	Diego	
1998	Wild Things	Frankie Condo	
1999	Held Up	Rodrigo	
2000	Knockout	Mario Rodrigues	
2001	Megiddo: The Omega Code 2	General García	
2004	The Punisher	Mike Toro	
2004	Man on Fire	Bodyguard 2A	
2006	Hot Tamale	Cousin Sammy	
2006	All You've Got	Javier Espinoza	
2015	Don Quixote	Mounted Brother	
2015	Ladrones	Santiago Guzmán	
2017	A Change of Heart	Cousin David	
2019	I Killed My Husband!	Pepe	

=== Television ===
Year	Project	Role	Notes
1981	Quiéreme siempre	Carlos	
1982	El amor nunca muere	Alfonso	
1983	El maleficio	Diego Rosales	
1984	Tú eres mi destino	Fabián	
1987	Senda de gloria	Manuel Fortuna	
1988–1989	Dulce desafío	Enrique Toledo	
1990	Yo compro esa mujer	Aldama	160 episodes
1990	En carne propia	Leonardo Rivadeneira	
1993	Guadalupe	Alfredo Robinson	209 episodes
1992	Marielena	Luis Felipe Sandoval	
1996	Miami Hustlers	José	Television film
1996–1997	Savannah	Benny Serna	4 episodes
1997	Soldier of Fortune, Inc.	Miguel Peralta	Episode: "Collateral Damage"
1999	Dr. Quinn, Medicine Woman: The Movie	Valdez	Television film
2001	18 Wheels of Justice	Amado	Episode: "Old Wives' Tale"
2002	CSI: Miami	Colombian Interrogator	Episode: "A Horrible Mind"
2003	Te amaré en silencio	Camilo	101 episodes
2005	Sleeper Cell	Felix Ortiz	Episode: "Money"
2005	Cold Case	Felix Darosa	Episode: "Frank's Best"
2006	La verdad oculta	Juan José Victoria Ocampo	20 episodes
2007	Destilando Amor	Rodrigo Montalvo	Main role; 168 episodes
2008	Fuego en la sangre	Juan Reyes	Main role
2009–2010	Corazón salvaje	Juan del Diablo / Juan de Dios San Román Montes de Oca / Juan Aldama de la Cruz	Main role; 135 episodes
2011	NCIS: Los Angeles	Antonio Medina	Episode: "Enemy Within"
2012–2013	Amores verdaderos	José Ángel Arriaga	Main role; 183 episodes
2015	Amores con trampa	Facundo Carmona	Main role; 128 episodes
2018–2021	Falsa identidad	Mateo Corona	Main role (seasons 1-2)
2019–2022	La Reina del Sur	Antonio Alcalá	Recurring role (seasons 2-3)
2019–2020	Sin miedo a la verdad	Presidente	Guest (season 2); Main role (season 3)
2022	Corazón guerrero	Octavio Sanchez	Guest
2023	Juego de mentiras	Pascual del Río	Main role
2023	Golpe de suerte	Nacho Pérez	Main role
2026	Lobo, morir matando	El Azufrero	

== Awards and nominations ==
=== Premios ACE (New York) ===
Year	Category	Telenovela	Result
1991	Male Figure of the Year	Yo compro esa mujer	Won
2008	Best Actor in Television Stage	Destilando Amor	Won
2009	Best Actor in Television Stage	Fuego en la sangre	Won

=== Emmy Awards ===
Year	Category	Telenovela	Result
1993	Best Actor in Television	Guadalupe	Won

=== Premios Bravo ===
Year	Category	Telenovela	Result
2008	Best Lead Actor	Destilando Amor	Won

=== Premios Juventud ===
Year	Category	Telenovela	Result
2013	¡Está buenísimo!	Amores Verdaderos	Nominated

=== TVyNovelas Awards ===
Year	Category	Telenovela	Result
1984	Best Male Revelation	El maleficio	Nominated
1988	Best Lead Actor	Senda de gloria	Won
1990	Best Young Lead Actor	Dulce desafío	Won
1991	Best Lead Actor	Yo compro esa mujer	Won
2007	Best Lead Actor	La Verdad Oculta	Won
2008	Best Lead Actor	Destilando Amor	Won
2009	Best Lead Actor	Fuego en la sangre	Nominated

=== Favoritos del público ===
Year	Category	Telenovela	Result
2014	Favorite Couple with Erika Buenfil	Amores Verdaderos	Won
2014	Favorite Kiss with Erika Buenfil	Amores Verdaderos	Nominated
