= Miguel Palmer =

Mexican actor (1942–2021)

- Born: Miguel Ángel Palomera Gonzali; 1 November 1942; Villahermosa, Mexico
- Died: 18 October 2021 (aged 78); Mexico City, Mexico
- Occupation: Actor

Miguel Palmer (born Miguel Ángel Palomera Gonzali; 1 November 1942 – 18 October 2021) was a Mexican actor.

== Filmography ==
- Mundo de juguete (1974)
- Mundos opuestos (1976)
- Rina (1977)
- Pasiones encendidas (1978)
- Viviana (1978)
- Los ricos también lloran (1979)
- Una mujer marcada (1979)
- Al rojo vivo (1980)
- Al final del arco iris (1982)
- Bodas de odio (1983)
- El maleficio (1983)
- Herencia maldita (1986)
- Senda de gloria (1987)
- Milagro y magia (1991)
- Marimar (1994)
- Amigas y rivales (2001)
- Dos hogares (2011)
- Señora Acero (2014)
- Sr. Ávila (2018)

== Awards ==
- Winner of TVyNovelas Award for Best Antagonist Actor (1983)
- Nomination for TVyNovelas Award for Best Actor (1984)
