= 7th TVyNovelas Awards =

1989 Mexican TV awards

- Date: May 10, 1989
- Location: Centro Libanés, Mexico D.F.
- Hosted by: Lucero

Highlights
- Most awards: Amor en silencio (6)
- Most nominations: Amor en silencio (9)

Television/radio coverage
- Network: Canal de las Estrellas

The 7th TVyNovelas Awards were an academy of special awards to the best soap operas and TV shows. The awards ceremony took place on May 10, 1989 in Centro Libanés, Mexico D.F. The ceremony was televised in Mexico by Canal de las Estrellas.

Lucero hosted the show. Amor en silencio won 6 awards, the most for the evening, including Best Telenovela. Other winners Nuevo amanecer and Pasión y poder won 3 awards, Encadenados won 2 awards and Dos vidas, El pecado de Oyuki and Flor y canela won 1 each.

== Summary of awards and nominations ==
Telenovela	Nominations	Awards
Amor en silencio	9	6
El pecado de Oyuki	7	1
Pasión y poder	6	3
El extraño retorno de Diana Salazar	5	0
Nuevo amanecer	3	3
Encadenados	3	2
El rincón de los prodigios	3	0
Dos vidas	1	1
Flor y canela	1	1

== Winners and nominees ==
=== Telenovelas ===
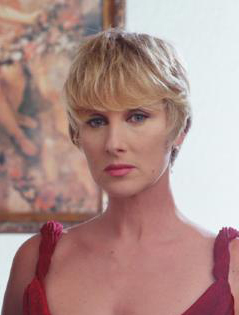
Christian Bach, winner for Best Actress.

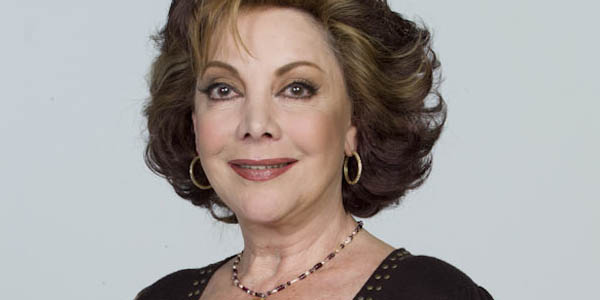
Jacqueline Andere, winner for Best Experienced Actress.

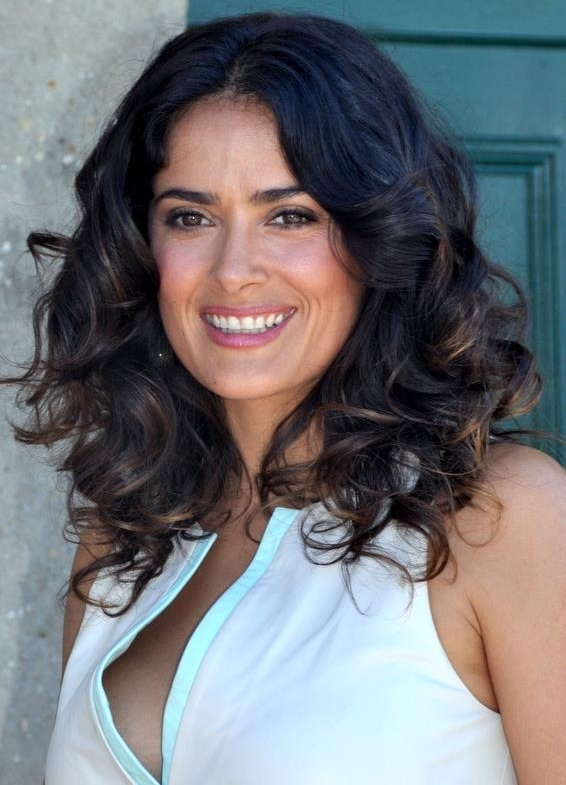
Salma Hayek, winner for Best Debut Actress.

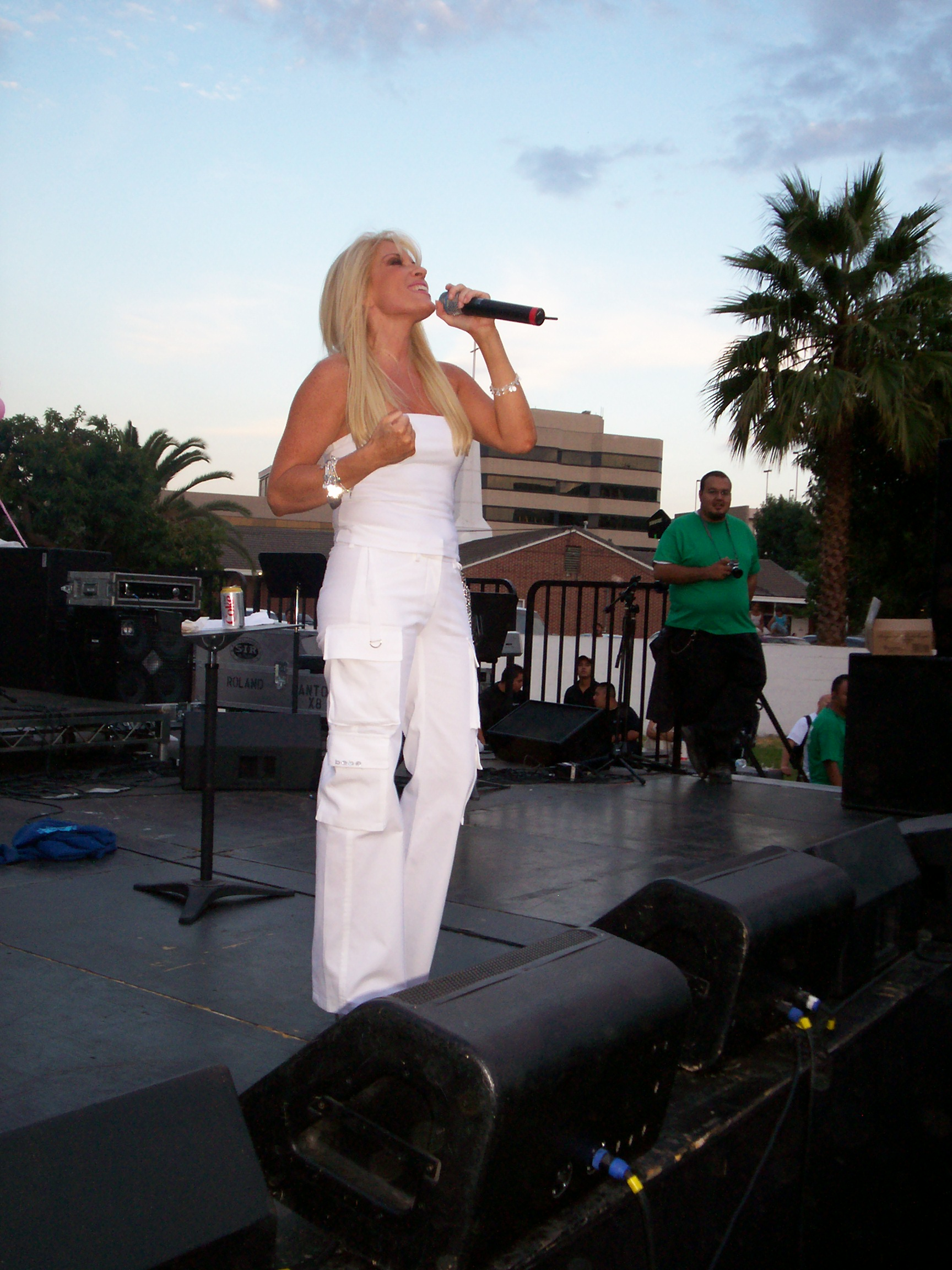
Yuri, winner for Best Female Singer.

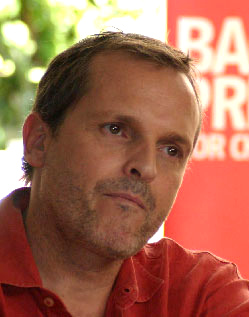
Miguel Bosé, awarded with a Special Award for Best Foreign Singer.

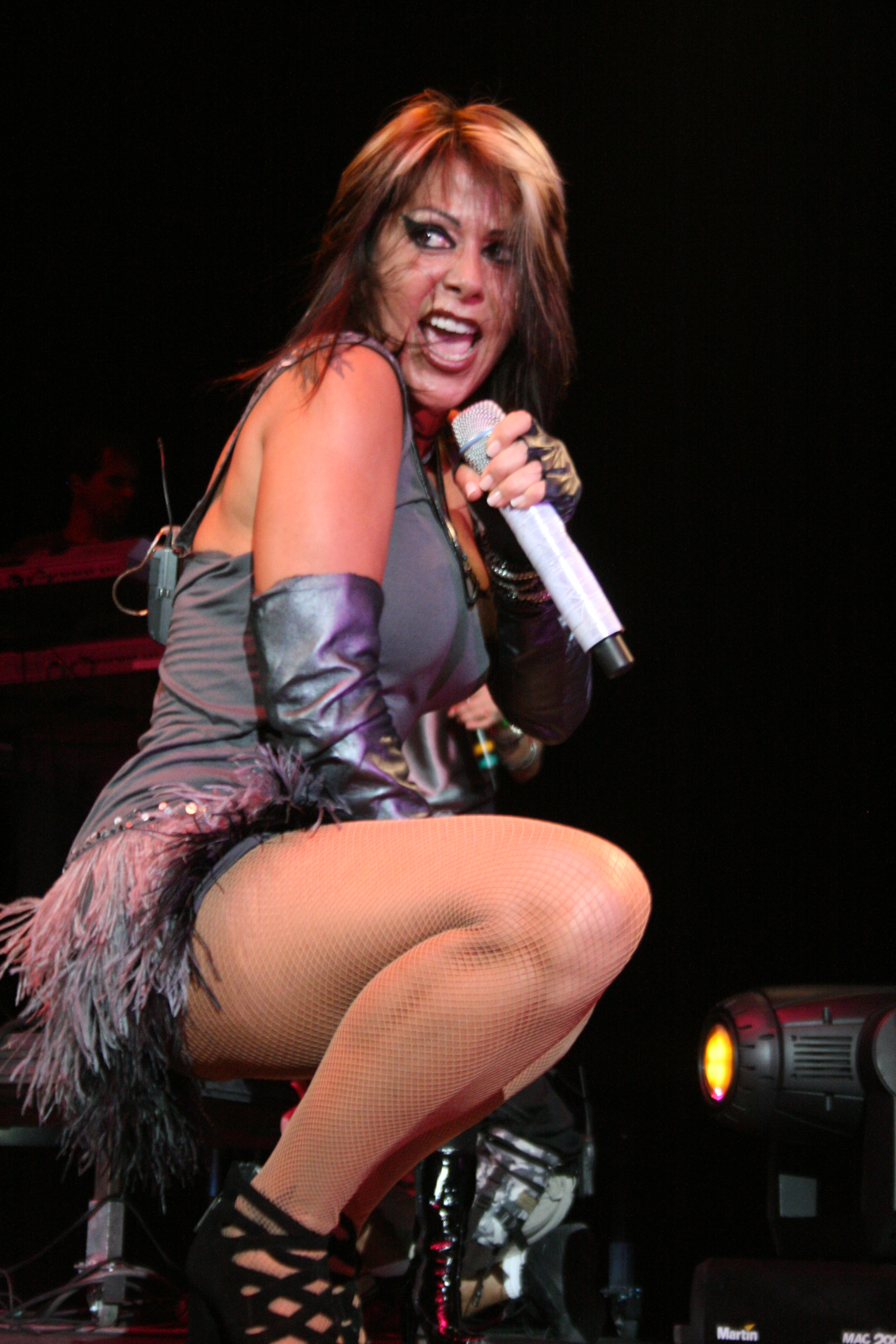
Alejandra Guzmán, awarded with a Special Award for Revelation as a Singer and Best Debut Singer of the Year.

Best Telenovela	Best Original Story or Adaptation
Amor en silencio; El extraño retorno de Diana Salazar; El pecado de Oyuki	Liliana Abud and Eric Vonn – Amor en silencio
Best Actress	Best Actor
Christian Bach – Encadenados; Ana Martín – El pecado de Oyuki; Lucía Méndez – El extraño retorno de Diana Salazar	Humberto Zurita – Encadenados; Arturo Peniche – Amor en silencio; Jorge Martínez – El extraño retorno de Diana Salazar
Best Antagonist Actress	Best Antagonist Actor
Margarita Sanz – Amor en silencio; Alma Muriel – El extraño retorno de Diana Salazar; Claudia Islas – Pasión y poder	Enrique Rocha – Pasión y poder; Salvador Sánchez – El pecado de Oyuki; Sergio Jiménez – Encadenados
Best Experienced Actress	Best Experienced Actor
Jacqueline Andere – Nuevo amanecer; Adriana Roel – El extraño retorno de Diana Salazar; Martha Roth – El pecado de Oyuki	Joaquín Cordero – Amor en silencio; Jorge Martínez de Hoyos – El pecado de Oyuki; Tony Carbajal – El rincón de los prodigios
Best Young Lead Actress	Best Young Lead Actor
Erika Buenfil – Amor en silencio; Alma Delfina – El rincón de los prodigios; Mariagna Prats – Pasión y poder	Ernesto Laguardia – Flor y canela; Demián Bichir – El rincón de los prodigios; Omar Fierro – Amor en silencio
Best Female Revelation	Best Male Revelation
Elvira Monsell – Amor en silencio; Cecilia Gabriela – El pecado de Oyuki; Lola Merino – Pasión y poder	Ari Telch – Dos vidas; Miguel Pizarro – Pasión y poder; José Elías Moreno – Amor en silencio

=== Others ===
Best Debut Actress	Best Debut Actor
Daniela Castro – Nuevo amanecer; Salma Hayek – Nuevo amanecer	Juan Carlos Muñoz – Pasión y poder
Best Direction of the Cameras	Best Comedy Program
Gabriel Vázquez Bulman – El pecado de Oyuki	Dr. Cándido Pérez
Best Comedy Actress	Best Comedy Actor
Anabel Ferreira – ¡Anabel!	Jorge Ortiz de Pinedo – Dr. Cándido Pérez
Revelation in Comedy	Best Musical and Variety Program
César Costa – Papá soltero	Siempre en domingo
Best Hostess	Best Host
Verónica Castro – Mala noche...¡no!	Raúl Velasco – Siempre en domingo
Best Female Singer	Best Male Singer
Yuri	Manuel Mijares

=== Special awards ===
- Best Television Series with Social Content: Mujer, casos de la vida real
- Recognition for Artistic Career: Guillermo Vázquez Villalobos
- Recognition for Artistic Career: Rafael Baledón
- Lifetime Achievement Award as a singer: Roberto Carlos
- Singer with Highest International Projection: Emmanuel
- Revelation as a Singer and Best Debut Singer of the Year: Alejandra Guzmán
- Best Foreign Singer: Miguel Bosé
- Best Music Band: Timbiriche
- Posthumous Tribute: Julio Castillo for his career as a stage director
