= Marissa Garrido =

Mexican telenovela playwright and writer (1926–2021)

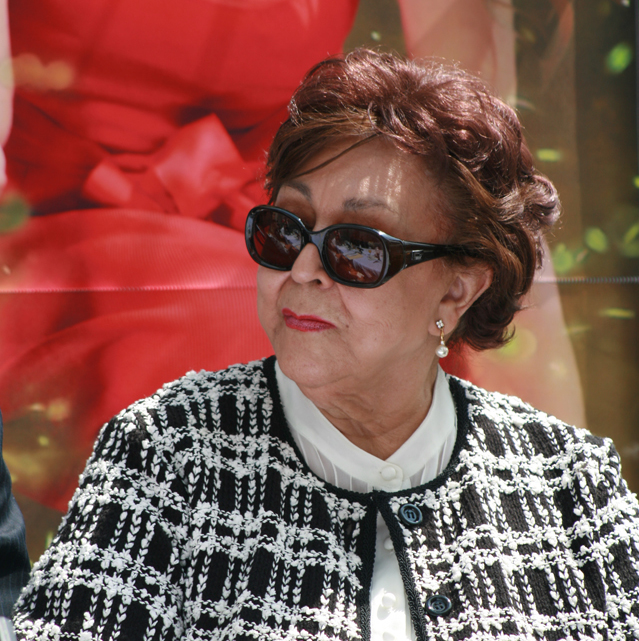
Marissa Garrido (2011)

Marissa Garrido Arozamena (May 30, 1926 – January 8, 2021) was a Mexican telenovela playwright and writer who was most active in the 1960s, 1970s and 1980s. She wrote forty-five adaptations and sixty-five original stories for television. Her most successful creation was La leona in 1961. The last telenovela she wrote was Besos prohibidos for TV Azteca in 1999. She was the sister of Mexican actress Amparo Garrido.

== Biography ==
From a family of artists, Marissa Garrido was born in Mexico City, May 30, 1926. She lived in the old Barrio del Carmen, although she traveled continuously for the artistic career of her parents. Her father was Juan S. Garrido, a Chilean composer living in Mexico, and her mother was the Mexican actress, Carmen Arozamena Sánchez, a former member of a theatrical group called "Las Hermanas Arozamena." Her maternal grandfather was Eduardo "Nanche" Arozamena Lira, a representative singer and actor during the Golden Age of Mexican cinema. Her sister, Amparo Garrido Arozamena, her uncle, Eduardo Arozamena Pasarón, as well as most of her family, worked as actors in radionovelas (radio soap opera), theater and dubbing.

As a child, Garrido was interested in the arts and studied piano. She was a student at the Conservatorio Nacional de Música. She also formally studied social work at the San Ildefonso College. She soon became interested in writing radionovelas for XEX-AM and thereafter, she changed the direction of her life. Her mother, Carmen, tried to discourage Garrido and her sisters from joining this artistic environment because it did not offer a stable job, being an activity that today is known as freelancer.

Garrido died in Mexico City from a severe respiratory complication caused by COVID-19 on January 8, 2021, at the age of 94.

== Works ==
=== Original stories ===
==== Radionovelas ====
- Diario de una mujer (with Prudencia Grifell )
- Corazón salvaje (of Caridad Bravo Adams)
- Al grito de la sangre (with Carmen Montejo)
- El hombre del paraguas
- Teatro familiar azteca
- Puerta al suspenso
- Mujeres célebres
- Por el ojo de la cerradura
- Sor Amparo
- Cita con Mauricio Garcés
- Un cuento para usted
- El pan de los pobres
- Culpas ajenas
- Lo que callan las mujeres

==== Telenovelas ====
- Besos prohibidos (1999)
- Azul Tequila (1998)
- Encadenados (1988)
- Pasión y poder (1988)
- Angélica (1985)
- En busca del paraíso (1982)
- Juegos del destino (1981) (with Arturo Moya Grau)
- Quiéreme siempre (1981)
- No temas al amor (1980)
- Querer volar (1980)
- Yara (1979)
- Paloma (1975)
- Barata de primavera (1975)
- La tierra (1974)
- Ha llegado una intrusa (1974)
- Duelo de Pasiones (1968)
- Entre sombras (1967)
- El juicio de nuestros hijos (1967)
- La razón de vivir (1966)
- Secreto de confesión (1965)
- Destino (1963)
- La leona (1961)
- Niebla (1961)
- Las gemelas (1961)

With Fernanda Villeli

- El amor ajeno (1983)
- Pasiones encendidas (1978)
- Pecado de amor (1978)
- Pacto de amor (1977)
- Mañana será otro día (1976)
- Mundos opuestos (1975)
- Entre brumas (1973)
- Muchacha italiana viene a casarse (1971–1973)

=== Adaptations ===
- Vida robada (1991)
- Secreto de confesión (1980)
- Una mujer marcada (1979)
- Puente de amor (1969)

With others

- La jefa del campeón (2018) - with Ximena Suárez; original by Héctor Rodríguez and Alejandro Torres
- Háblame de amor (1999) - original by Eric Vonn
- Azul (1996) - original by Pinkye Morris
- Mi pequeña Soledad (1990) - with René Muñoz; original by Jorge Lozano Soriano

=== Literary editions ===
- Imperio de cristal (1994) written with Jaime García Estrada and Orlando Merino
- Flor y canela (1988) - original by Benito Pérez Galdós
- Mi rival (1973) - original by Inés Rodena
- Muchacha italiana viene a casarse (1971) - original by Delia González Márquez
- Sueña conmigo, Donaji (1967) - original by Caridad Bravo Adams

=== Books ===
- Pensamientos, sentimientos, historias. (2011) Compilation: Silvia Castillejos Peral. SOGEM-Chapingo
