= En busca del paraíso (1982 TV series) =

- Genre: Telenovela
- Created by: Marissa Garrido
- Written by: Marissa Garrido
- Directed by: Alfredo Saldaña
- Starring: Maricruz Olivier; Victoria Ruffo; Juan Luis Galiardo; David Reynoso; Miguel Angel Ferriz; Carlos Bracho
- Country of origin: Mexico
- Original language: Spanish
- No. of episodes: 20

Production
- Executive producer: Ernesto Alonso
- Cinematography: Alfredo Saldaña
- Running time: 21–22 minutes

Original release
- Network: Canal de las Estrellas
- Release: 1982 – 1983

Related
- El amor nunca muere; Bodas de odio

En busca del paraíso (English title: In search of paradise) is a Mexican telenovela produced by Ernesto Alonso for the broadband Televisa in 1982. It starred by Maricruz Olivier, Victoria Ruffo, Juan Luis Galiardo, David Reynoso, Miguel Angel Ferriz and Carlos Bracho.

== Cast ==
- Maricruz Olivier as Patricia
- Victoria Ruffo as Grisel
- Juan Luis Galiardo as Gustavo
- David Reynoso as Antonio
- Miguel Angel Ferriz as Alberto
- Carlos Bracho as José Luis
- Yolanda Ciani as Rosaura
- Susana Alexander as Sofia
- Laura Flores as Yolanda
- Lili Garza as Josefina
- Nubia Martí as Jessica
- Agustín Sauret as Enrique
- Anita Blanch as Pachita #1
- Lucha Altamirano as Pachita #2
- Amparo Arozamena as Hortensia
- Francisco Avendaño as Carlos
- Martha de Castro as Elisa
- Vicky de la Piedra as Violeta
- Alejandro Ruiz
- Jacqueline Andere
