= La Chingada, Veracruz =

- Town
- Location in Veracruz La Chingada, Veracruz (Mexico)
- Coordinates: 19°27′20″N 97°19′48″W
- Country: Mexico
- State: Veracruz
- Region: Capital Region
- Municipality: Perote

Population
  - Total: 7,000

La Chingada is a town in the municipality of Perote in the Mexican state of Veracruz.

The place is famous for its name, the Mexican Spanish vulgarism La Chingada. It means, roughly, 'the fucked', a vulgar but common reference to La Malinche, the Nahua interpreter of Hernán Cortés, the Spanish conquistador who conquered Mexico. The term "La Chingada" is used in a variety of mostly offensive or vulgar meanings. For example, Vete a la Chingada means something like 'go to hell'.

Although there are several places in Mexico called La Chingada, this is the best known.

== See also ==
- Isla Salsipuedes
- Castrillo Matajudíos
- La Matanza
- Corte de Peleas
- Peor es Nada
