= Secreto de confesión (1980 TV series) =

- Genre: Telenovela
- Created by: Marissa Garrido
- Directed by: Karlos Velázquez
- Starring: Silvia Derbez; Gustavo Rojo
- Country of origin: Mexico
- Original language: Spanish
- No. of episodes: 20

Production
- Executive producer: Ernesto Alonso
- Cinematography: Tony Carbajal
- Running time: 30 minutes

Original release
- Network: Canal de las Estrellas
- Release: 1980

Related
- Secreto de confesión (1965)

Secreto de confesión (English title: Secret confession) is a Mexican telenovela produced by Ernesto Alonso for Televisa in 1980.

== Cast ==
- Silvia Derbez as Alicia
- Gustavo Rojo as Jorge
- Nelly Meden as Roxana
- Tere Valadez as Matilde
- Graciela Doring as Lucha
- Úrsula Prats as Carmela
- Yolanda Ciani as Luisa
- Rafael Sánchez Navarro as Gustavo
- Miguel Ángel Ferriz as Carlos
- Kiko Campos as Raul
- Roger Cudney as Burton
- Mario Sauret as Julio
- Eduardo Castell as Priest Javier
- Humberto Osuna as Felipe
- Mariela Flores as Julia
- Maristel Molina as Emilia
- Marissa del Carmen as Aurelia
- Bertha Moss as Beatriz
