= Una mujer marcada =

Mexican telenovela

- Genre: Telenovela
- Created by: Marissa Garrido
- Directed by: Alfredo Saldaña
- Starring: Sasha Montenegro; Martín Cortés
- Country of origin: Mexico
- Original language: Spanish
- No. of episodes: 20

Production
- Executive producer: Ernesto Alonso

Original release
- Network: Canal de las Estrellas
- Release: 1979

Related
- La leona (1961); Si Dios me quita la vida (1995)

Una mujer marcada is a Mexican telenovela produced by Ernesto Alonso for Televisa in 1979.

== Cast ==
- Sasha Montenegro as Lorena / Loraine Montiel
- Martin Cortés as Gino Valenti
- Isabela Corona as Sofía
- María Eugenia Ríos as Gloria
- Jorge Mondragón as Don Ramón
- Miguel Palmer as Aldo
- Alfonso Meza as Fernando
- Agustín Sauret as Joe
- Lucha Altamirano as Balbina
- Eduardo Alcaraz as Franco
- Mónica Sánchez Navarro as Lucero
- Eugenia Avendaño as Alejandra
