= Flor y canela =

Mexican telenovela

- Genre: Telenovela; Romance; Drama
- Created by: Benito Pérez Galdós
- Written by: María Teresa Calderón; Marissa Garrido
- Directed by: Luis Vélez
- Starring: Mariana Garza; Daniela Leites; Ernesto Laguardia; Edith González; Ari Telch; Edgardo Gazcón; Salvador Sánchez; Guillermo Murray
- Opening theme: Instrumental
- Country of origin: Mexico
- Original language: Spanish
- No. of episodes: 100

Production
- Executive producer: Eugenio Cobo
- Running time: 21–22 minutes
- Production company: Televisa

Original release
- Network: Canal de las Estrellas
- Release: October 3, 1988 – February 17, 1989

Related
- Rina (rebroadcast); El cristal empañado; Marianela (1961) Flor y canela (1993 Mini-series)

Flor y canela is a Mexican telenovela produced by Eugenio Cobo for Televisa in 1988. It based on a story by the Spanish writer Benito Pérez Galdós, adapted by María Teresa Calderón and Marissa Garrido and directed by Luis Vélez.

Mariana Garza as Marianela, who later would be replaced by Daniela Leites, and Ernesto Laguardia starred as protagonists, while Mónica Miguel starred as the antagonist.

== Plot ==
In the 1940s, in a Mexican mining town lives María de la Canela, nicknamed Marianela. This dirty and ragged orphan is despised by villagers who see it inherited traits madness of his mother committed suicide by jumping off a ravine. Is that where Marianela goes in search of advice ghost of his mother. The only loving being with the beggar is Pablo, a rich guy but blind Marianela who served as guide.

Unable for him to see how his guide looks, Pablo imagines her as a beautiful woman and does not let anyone tell him otherwise. Pablo's father arranged the marriage of his son with Florentina, the daughter of the village notary. Tomás, an ophthalmologist known advises that Pablo go to the United States operated. It was decided that the wedding will take place after Pablo can already see.

When Pablo returns, cured, he is horrified to see the true aspect of Marianela, and prefers to Florentina corresponding to their ideal of feminine beauty. However, Florentina in love with Carlos, a mining engineer married a frivolous woman. The Marianela desperate attempts suicide, but is rescued by Tomás who falls for her.

== Cast ==
- Mariana Garza as María de la Canela "Marianela" #1
- Daniela Leites as María de la Canela "Marianela" #2
- Ernesto Laguardia as Pablo
- Edith González as Florentina
- Ari Telch as Tomás García
- Edgardo Gazcón as Carlos
- Salvador Sánchez as Sinforoso
- Guillermo Murray as Francisco
- Oscar Morelli as Manuel
- Aurora Molina as Dorotea
- Ricardo De Loera as Remigio
- Mónica Miguel as Ana
- Rosita Pelayo as Juana
- Miguel Córcega as El Galán
- Adalberto Parra as Atanasio
- Rosario Zúñiga as Josefa
- Christian Ramírez as Felipín
- Marta Resnikoff as Florence
- Irlanda Mora as Trudi
- Isabel Andrade as Paca
- Aurora Cortés
- Germán Bernal
- Cecilia Gabriela
- José Elías Moreno

== Awards ==
| Year | Award | Category | Nominee | Result |
|---|---|---|---|---|
| 1989 | 7th TVyNovelas Awards | Best Young Lead Actor | Ernesto Laguardia | Won |
