= El maleficio =

1983 Mexican telenovela

- Title card
- Genre: Telenovela
- Created by: Fernanda Villeli
- Directed by: Raúl Araiza
- Starring: See list
- Opening theme: "Hombre" by Norma Herrera
- Country of origin: Mexico
- Original language: Spanish
- No. of episodes: 325

Production
- Executive producer: Ernesto Alonso
- Cinematography: Carlos Sánchez Zúñiga
- Production company: Televisa

Original release
- Network: Canal de las Estrellas
- Release: February 7, 1983 – April 27, 1984

Related
- El maleficio 2: Los enviados del infierno; El maleficio (2023 TV series)

El maleficio (English: The Curse) is a Mexican supernatural horror telenovela directed by Raúl Araiza and produced by Ernesto Alonso for Televisa in 1983. The telenovela was so successful in 1983 that a sequel was made under the title of El maleficio 2: Los enviados del infierno in 1986.

Ernesto Alonso and Jacqueline Andere starred in the lead roles, alongside Humberto Zurita, Norma Herrera, María Sorté and Carmen Montejo.

== Plot ==
Beatriz is a respectable widow, who after the death of her husband, dedicated her life to raising her children, Vicky and Juanito, together with her mother-in-law Doña Emilia. Beatriz meets the powerful millionaire Enrique de Martino, who dazzles her with his attentions and agrees to marry him.

Beatriz's life and her children change dramatically when they move to Martino's Mansion, where they come into contact with Enrique's strange children: the perverse Jorge, the sweet but confused César and the enigmatic Raúl. Beatriz also discovers that her husband can be very mean and that he drove his first wife Nora into alcoholism. Meanwhile, Juanito discovers that he has paranormal powers that are awakened by coming into contact with the evil atmosphere that surrounds his stepfather.

Enrique is actually a sorcerer who has made his fortune thanks to the dark arts and frequently visits witches in the city of Oaxaca, especially Teodora, who worships a diabolical entity whom he calls "Bael" and who manifests himself through a painting that Enrique jealously guards in his office. At the request of his brotherhood (mafia) led by an Italian based in New York, Luiggi, Enrique starts a mission to choose his successor, who he desires to be at least or even more evil that himself. After numerous tests, Jorge seems to be in the lead. But in some missions, he disobeys, generally driven by a very excessive personal ambition, which makes Enrique hesitate to give the succession to Jorge, but there is no other person so evil.

Roberto Ayala, Beatriz's husband, has not actually died and reappears in her life pretending to be his twin Ricardo, whom the brotherhood had actually murdered. Roberto is horrified to see the bad influence that De Martino has on his family. In the middle of it all, Jorge abuses Vicky and makes her pregnant. Enrique forces Vicky to marry Jorge, against the will of Beatriz and Jorge himself.

For all their evil, the brotherhood held a few ironically virtuous ideals. One of them being, "blood should never be denied" and since Jorge pretended not to know his son, he loses the probable line of succession in the group. Because of this, the worst is yet to happen. Enrique has set his evil sights on Juanito to become his successor.

== Cast ==
- Ernesto Alonso as Don Enrique de Martino
- Jacqueline Andere as Doña Beatriz de Martino
- Norma Herrera as Doña Nora Valdés de Martino
- Humberto Zurita as Jorge de Martino Valdés
- Carmen Montejo as Doña Emilia
- Sergio Jiménez as Raúl de Martino Valdés/Damián Juárez
- María Sorté as Patricia Lara
- Erika Buenfil as Virginia "Vicky" Ayala de Martino
- Emilia Carranza as María Reyna
- Gloria Mayo as Eva
- Arsenio Campos as Álvaro
- Sergio Goyri as César de Martino Valdés
- Rebecca Jones as Ruth Reyna
- Eduardo Yáñez as Diego Rosales
- Alba Nydia Díaz as Sara
- Alfredo Leal as Ricardo/Roberto
- Jorge del Campo as Felipe Reyna
- Alfonso Meza as Lt. Larios
- Patricia Reyes Spíndola as Teodora
- Carlos Bracho as Pedro Jiménez
- Gina Romand as Alicia
- Armando Araiza as Juan "Juanito" de Martino
- Ana Patricia Rojo as Liliana
- Mónica Martell as Alma Bauer
- Raquel Olmedo as Yuliana Pietri
- Héctor Sáez as Joao
- Nerina Ferrer as Lorena de la Garza
- Barbara Hermen as Lourdes "Lulú"
- Guillermo Aguilar as Meyer
- Malena Doria as Soledad
- Angélica Chain as Cinthia

== Awards ==
Year	Award	Category	Nominee	Result
1984	2nd TVyNovelas Awards	Best Telenovela of the Year	Ernesto Alonso	Nominated
1984	2nd TVyNovelas Awards	Best Actress	Jacqueline Andere	Nominated
1984	2nd TVyNovelas Awards	Best Actor	Ernesto Alonso	Won
1984	2nd TVyNovelas Awards	Best Antagonist Actor	Humberto Zurita	Won
1984	2nd TVyNovelas Awards	Best Female Revelation	Erika Buenfil	Nominated
1984	2nd TVyNovelas Awards	Best Male Revelation	Sergio Goyri	Won
1984	2nd TVyNovelas Awards	Best Male Revelation	Eduardo Yáñez	Nominated
1984	2nd TVyNovelas Awards	Best Child Performance	Armando Araiza	Won
1984	2nd TVyNovelas Awards	Best Child Performance	Ana Patricia Rojo	Won

== Reboot ==
In October 2018, Televisa announced that they were rebooting the series. José Alberto Castro serves as executive producer. The series is set to premiere on 13 November 2023.
