= Tierra de Pasiones =

- Genre: Romance; Action; Drama; Black humor
- Created by: Eric Vonn
- Developed by: Telemundo
- Directed by: Danny Gavidia; Luis Manzo
- Starring: Gabriela Spanic; Saul Lisazo; Catherine Siachoque; Héctor Suárez
- Theme music composer: Juan Carlos Rodríguez
- Opening theme: Tierra de pasiones Necesito tu tierra by Gabriela Spanic
- Country of origin: United States
- Original language: Spanish
- No. of episodes: 172

Production
- Executive producer: Aurelio Valcárcel Carroll
- Producer: Martha Godoy
- Production location: Miami, Florida
- Editors: Sebastián Jiménez; Macorix Perera
- Camera setup: Multi-camera
- Running time: 42-55 minutes

Original release
- Network: Telemundo
- Release: February 20 – October 24, 2006

Related
- El cuerpo del deseo; Marina

Tierra de pasiones (Land of Passions) is a Spanish-language telenovela produced by Telemundo, starring Gabriela Spanic and Saúl Lisazo. It was billed as "a Falcon Crest-like novela set in Miami". Filmed on a set in Homestead, Florida, Tierra de Pasiones aired weekdays from February 20, 2006 to October 24, 2006 at 8 pm ET.

== Plot ==
In a beautiful valley where the most exquisite grapes are farmed, an intense and sizzling love story will flourish between Valeria San Roman, a beautiful woman with a strong character, which has given her the strength to face life's deceptions, and Francisco Contreras, renowned publisher, widower and a man of will.

Valeria, who manages the San Roman vineyard, hasn’t had an easy life. Her own father, Jose Maria 'Chema' San Roman, the family's patriarch, has always hated her because she is the only one who doesn’t obey him. A man without scruples, selfish and womanizing, Chema arrived to the United States, married Valeria's mom to steal everything from her and later disposed of her. If that weren’t enough, Chema schemes a hideous plan causing Valeria to experience a horrible betrayal.

Meanwhile, Francisco arrives to visit his father at the ranch only to learn that he has married Marcia, a woman much younger than he who leads him to the brink of bankruptcy and drives him to suicide. At that time, Francisco decides to stay in the valley and save the family business from bankruptcy.

When Valeria and Francisco meet, their strong personalities undoubtedly clash, although it is evident that there is a strong chemistry between them. They team up to form a partnership convenient to both and are resigned to the idea of having to put up with each other. As they get to know one another, a love stems between them that will survive all the challenges they will encounter along the way.

But, when destiny finally gives Valeria this new opportunity, Pablo, an old flame she thought was dead, comes back from the past to change everything.

== Cast ==
Main Cast in Order of Appearance

Actor	Character
Gabriela Spanic	Valeria San Roman Rentería
Saul Lisazo	Francisco Contreras
Catherine Siachoque	Marcia Hernández Piñeiros
Héctor Suárez	José Maria "Chema" San Román
Francisco Gattorno	Pablo González
Elluz Peraza	Laura Contreras
Ariel López Padilla	Javier Ortigoza
Sergio Catalán	Jorge San Román Rentería Sánchez
Ricardo Chávez	Miguel Valdez
Isabel Moreno	Mariana "Nana" Sánchez
Liliana Rodríguez	Lourdes "Lulu" Aguilar
Carlos Mesber	Gerardo Aguilar
Carolina Lizarazo	Paula Hernández Piñeiros
Raúl Izaguirre	Carlos Domínguez
Álvaro Ruiz	Padre Amado
Xavier Coronel	Ismael Ojera
Alcira Gil	Zoraida Beltrán de Domínguez
Yamil Sesin	Danilo Mendez #1
José Ramón Blanch	Danilo Mendez #2
Géraldine Bazán	Belinda San Román Rentería
Arap Bethke	Roberto "Beto" Contreras
Teresa Tuccio	Gabriela "Gaby" López
Jessica Cerezo	Daniela "Dany" Domínguez
Carlos East	Alejandro "Alex" Domínguez
Eduardo Cuervo	Mauricio "Mauro" López
Fred Valle	Gustavo Contreras
Gladys Yañez	Pilar Aguilar
Roxana Peña	Patricia
Guisela Moro	Mayte
Bernhard Seifert	Ramiro
Nancy Álvarez	Yolanda
Fernando Bravo	Lucas
Leonardo Kris	Dr. Elías Cavallero
Francheska Mattei	Lupe
Jorge Hernández	
Julio Ocampo	Andrés González
Clemencia Valásquez	Dora Gálvez
Eduardo Ibarrola	Rómulo Gálvez
Kenya Hijuelos	Lorna Gálvez
Renán Almendárez Coello	Jesús ‘Chucho’ Gálvez
Martha Mijares	Olga de Mendez
Ivelin Giro	Bibiana 'Bibi' Alfaro de Acevedo
Liliana Tapia	Elvira Acevedo
Juan Carlos Gutiérrez	Horacio Acevedo
Bernie Paz	Fernando Solís
German Barrios	Agustín Arizmendi
Chela Arias	Mercedes
Juan David Ferrer	Raúl Reyes
Luís Celeiro	Alvaro
Adriana Oliveros	Mariela
Joel Sotolongo	David
Sonia Noemí	Cecilia
Luís Felipe Bagos	Vicente "Chente"
Iván Hernández	Candido
Rubén Darío Gamez	
Jhonny Acero	Godoy
Thomas Doval	Medina
Richard Larralde	Drug Dealer
Aby Raymond	
Luís Rivas	

== Crew ==
Occupation	Person
Original Story and Screenplay by:	Eric Vonn
Costume Designer:	Fiorella Garibaldi
Casting:	Gustavo Puerta Serrano
Song-"Tierra de Pasiones" interprets:	Gabriela Spanic
Authors:	Alberto Slezynger; Pablo Cáceres
Arreglas:	Vinicio Ludovic
Song-"Necesito tu Tierra" interpretes:	Gabriela Spanic
Author:	Gabriela Spanic
Art Director:	Piedad Arango
Director of Art and Scenography:	Oscar Cortes
Background:	José Carlos Del Pino
Makeup:	Luís Rivera
Original Music:	Juan Carlos Rodríguez
Editors:	Sebastián Jiménez; Macorix Perera
Musicalization:	Shafik Palis; Joaquín Fernández
Direction of Photography:	Juan Pablo Puentes; José Luís Ocejo; Joseph Martínez
Supervision of Production:	Andrés Lugo
Director Assistants:	Aimee Godiñez; Mariana Iskandariani
General Production:	Martha Godoy
General Direction:	Danny Gavidia; Luís Manzo
Exterior Director:	Freddy Trujillo
Executive Producer:	Aurelio Valcárcel Carroll

== Broadcasters ==
Country	Alternate title/Translation	TV network(s)	Series premiere	Series finale	Weekly schedule	Timeslot
Azerbaijan	Ehtiraslar Vadisi	Lider TV	2007	2008	Monday to Friday	18:00
Bulgaria	Земя на страстта	bTV	September 4, 2006	May 1, 2007	Monday to Friday	17:00
Croatia	Zemlja strasti	Nova TV	2006		Monday to Friday	
Georgia	ვნებათა მიწა	Rustavi 2	September 18, 2006	April 19, 2007	Monday to Friday	18:45
Hungary	Második esély (Second Chance)	RTL Klub	May 12, 2009	January 21, 2010	Monday to Friday	15:15
Indonesia	Hamparan Cinta	Vision 2 Drama	July 29, 2008	2008	Monday to Friday	21:05
Lithuania	Aistrų žemė	TV3 Viasat	2007 Autumn	2008	Monday to Friday	15:40
Macedonia	Земја на страсти	Sitel TV	2007	2008	Monday to Friday	17:00
Romania	Taramul pasiunii	Acasa TV	2006	2007	Monday to Friday	
Serbia	Valerija	RTV Pink	December 12, 2006	August 15, 2007	Monday to Friday	17:30
Venezuela	Tierra de Pasiones	RCTV	2006	2007	Monday to Saturday	14:00
