= Bodas de odio =

Mexican telenovela

- Genre: Telenovela; Romance; Drama
- Created by: Caridad Bravo Adams
- Written by: María Zarattini
- Directed by: José Rendón
- Starring: Frank Moro; Christian Bach; Miguel Palmer; Magda Guzmán; Rafael Sánchez Navarro; Rosario Gálvez; Antonio Valencia; María Montaño; Carlos Riquelme; Yolanda Mérida; Julieta Egurrola
- Theme music composer: Giuseppe Verdi
- Opening theme: L'entrèe (Preulde to La Traviata).
- Country of origin: Mexico
- Original language: Spanish
- No. of episodes: 75

Production
- Executive producer: Ernesto Alonso
- Production locations: Puebla, Mexico
- Cinematography: Carlos Sánchez Zúñiga
- Running time: 21-22 minutes
- Production company: Televisa

Original release
- Network: Canal de las Estrellas
- Release: 1983 – 1984

Related
- Marisol (1996); Amor real (2003); Lo que la vida me robó (2013)

Bodas de odio (English title: Hate Weddings) is a Mexican telenovela produced by Ernesto Alonso for Televisa in 1983. It was based on an original story by Caridad Bravo Adams that was adapted by María Zarattini and directed by José Rendón.

The series stars Frank Moro, Christian Bach, Miguel Palmer, Magda Guzmán, Rafael Sánchez Navarro, Rosario Gálvez, Antonio Valencia, María Montaño, Carlos Riquelme, Yolanda Mérida and Julieta Egurrola

The telenovela received the TVyNovelas Award for Best Telenovela of the Year in the 1984 TVyNovelas Awards.

== Plot ==
This story unfolds in the early 20th century in the city of Puebla, Mexico, where Magdalena Mendoza (Christian Bach), a young woman from a once-wealthy family now fallen on hard times, lives. She maintains a secret romance with José Luis Álvarez (Frank Moro), a penniless military man who loves her with all his heart.

The family's dire financial straits have forced them to mortgage most of their possessions. To maintain the social standing they have enjoyed until now, Magdalena's mother, Paula (Rosario Gálvez), has decided that her daughter must marry a wealthy man of high social standing.

Paula herself chooses Alejandro Almonte (Miguel Palmer) as the perfect candidate. He has just inherited a considerable fortune following the recent death of his father, a landowner who had acknowledged him as his legitimate son moments before dying.

Upon discovering Magdalena's relationship with José Luis, in collusion with her ambitious son, Dimitrio (Rafael Sánchez Navarro), she manages to have the young soldier imprisoned; simultaneously convincing her daughter that he has been deceiving her.

Out of spite, Magdalena agrees to marry Alejandro, who has also taken upon himself to cover the family's debts in exchange for being allowed to court the young woman, with whom he has been captivated since the moment he saw her.

But on the very day of the wedding, José Luis, who has escaped from prison, arrives to find Magdalena, clearing up the entire misunderstanding and agreeing to elope with her. However, the plan is discovered by Alejandro, who, filled with rage at the betrayal he has suffered, decides to take Magdalena to his ranch, forcing her to live with him against her will.

For his part, José Luis is not willing to let the love of his life escape, so he doesn't stop until he finds her. Assuming a false identity, José Luis arrives at Alejandro's ranch determined to take Magdalena away.

But he doesn't realize that, over time, her feelings have changed, because, as she has grown closer to Alejandro, she has come to understand that he is the one she truly loves. José Luis's refusal to leave the ranch will trigger a series of terrible consequences that will ultimately have a profound impact on everyone's lives.

== Cast ==
=== Main ===
- Frank Moro as Jose Luis
- Christian Bach as Magdalena
- Miguel Palmer as Alejandro
- Magda Guzmán as Carmen
- Rafael Sánchez Navarro as Dimitrio
- Rosario Gálvez as Paula
- Antonio Valencia as Adolfo
- María Montaño as María
- Yolanda Mérida as Rosario
- Carlos Riquelme as Iván
- Julieta Egurrola as Josefina

=== Recurring and guest stars ===
- Roberto Antúnez as Cipriano
- Arturo Benavides as Rufino
- Arsenio Campos as Sebastián
- Ofelia Cano as Nadia
- Helio Castillos as Juventino
- Carmen Cortés as Manuela
- Enrique del Castillo as Loreto
- Rosa Elena Díaz as Margarita
- José Antonio Ferral as Víctor
- Nerina Ferrer as Amalia
- Consuelo Frank as Prudencia
- Alfonso Kafitti as Alfonso
- Silvia Manríquez as Armida
- Antonio Medellín as Francisco
- Jorge Mondragón as Father Abundio
- Miguel Ángel Negrete as Manuel
- José Luis Padilla as Porfirio Díaz
- Adalberto Parra as Ezequiel
- Patsy as Angélica
- Fabio Ramírez as Joaquín
- Lizzeta Romo as Esperanza
- Lupe Silva as Dominga
- Carlos Villarreal as Tomás
- Luis Xavier as Felipe

== Awards and nominations ==
| Year | Award | Category | Nominee | Result |
|---|---|---|---|---|
| 1984 | TVyNovelas Awards | Best Telenovela | Ernesto Alonso | Won |
| 1984 | TVyNovelas Awards | Best Actress | Christian Bach | Won |
| 1984 | TVyNovelas Awards | Best Actor | Frank Moro | Nominated |
| 1984 | TVyNovelas Awards | Best Actor | Miguel Palmer | Nominated |
| 1984 | TVyNovelas Awards | Best Antagonist Actress | Rosario Gálvez | Nominated |
| 1984 | TVyNovelas Awards | Best Antagonist Actor | Rafael Sánchez Navarro | Nominated |
| 1984 | TVyNovelas Awards | Best Female Revelation | Julieta Egurrola | Won |
| 1984 | TVyNovelas Awards | Best Male Revelation | Antonio Valencia | Nominated |
| 1984 | TVyNovelas Awards | Best Production | Ernesto Alonso | Won |
| 1987 | Latin ACE Awards | Best Actor | Frank Moro | Won |
