= El extraño retorno de Diana Salazar =

Mexican telenovela

- Genre: Telenovela
- Created by: Mario Cruz
- Screenplay by: Margarita Villaseñor; Carlos Olmos; Carlos Téllez
- Directed by: Carlos Téllez
- Starring: Lucía Méndez; Jorge Martínez; Alejandro Camacho; Alma Muriel
- Theme music composer: Pedro Plasencia Salinas; Carlos Páramo; Fernando Riba; Kiko Campos; Juan Gabriel
- Opening theme: "Morir un poco" by Lucía Méndez; "Un alma en pena" by Lucía Méndez
- Country of origin: México
- Original language: Spanish
- No. of episodes: 196

Production
- Executive producer: Carlos Téllez
- Producer: Carlos Téllez
- Cinematography: Gabriel Vázquez Bulman
- Production company: Televisa

Original release
- Network: Las Estrellas
- Release: April 11, 1988 – January 13, 1989

Related
- El extraño retorno de Diana Salazar (2024 TV series)

El extraño retorno de Diana Salazar (English title: The Strange Return of Diana Salazar) is a Mexican telenovela produced by Carlos Téllez for Televisa in 1988. It is an unusual example of a telenovela which addresses supernatural topics. The telenovela first begins in Zacatecas, New Spain in 1640 and later transitions to Mexico City in 1988, in which a woman accused of witchcraft and burned by the Holy Inquisition, reincarnates into a young girl who seeks to find the reason for her constant nightmare of being burned at the stake. The series stars Lucía Méndez, Jorge Martínez, Alejandro Camacho and Alma Muriel.

Tlnovelas aired a rerun of the telenovela from January 27, 2020 through May 29, 2020. As of December 29, 2020, the series is available to stream on Blim TV.

== Plot ==
In 1640, in the city of Zacatecas, in New Spain, the young and beautiful aristocrat Leonor de Santiago (Lucía Méndez) celebrated her marriage proposal to Don Eduardo Carbajal (Jorge Martínez). Her joy is overshadowed by a fear: Leonor possesses strange psychic powers, such as telekinesis and premonitions. Leonor begins to have strange dreams and premonitions in which she sees a dark future in her relationship with Eduardo.

Leonor and Eduardo are stalked by Lucrecia Treviño (Alma Muriel), a mysterious woman who feels a sickly love for Eduardo. Desperate, Lucrecia sets out to destroy the happiness between Leonor and Eduardo. Lucrecia discovers the mysterious powers attributed to Leonor, and with the help of her faithful servant Casilda (Ella Laboriel), decides to resort to witchcraft, making spells to separate the couple.

The night that Leonor and Eduardo celebrate their engagement party, Lucrecia breaks into Leonor's residence and accuses her of practicing witchcraft in front of one of the main authorities of the Holy Office of the Inquisition that was among the guests at the celebration. Eduardo defends Leonor, who experiences a nervous breakdown and uses her telekinetic powers in front of everyone, putting herself in evidence. Both Leonor and Eduardo are accused of practicing witchcraft and the dark arts. Both are prosecuted by the inquisitor court and sentenced to die by being burned at the stake. Upon learning that her accusation condemned Eduardo, Lucrecia commits suicide by hanging from a tree. Before dying, Leonor and Eduardo make a pact of love promising to meet in another life.

The story then shifts more than three centuries later, to Mexico City in 1988. There lives Diana Salazar (Lucía Méndez), a young middle class girl who lives with her mother, Delfina (Adriana Roel) and her older sister, Malena (Rosa María Bianchi). Diana's life is not simple. Since she was a child, she has manifested mysterious gifts that grant her extraordinary abilities. Diana possesses telekinetic abilities and premonitory powers. This situation makes her live tormented. Her father died in an accident long ago and Diana had visions about his death. Because of this, Delfina makes Diana feel responsible for the death of her father, in addition to making her believe that her powers are a curse.

Diana begins to have mysterious dreams, which are nothing more than visions of the tragic death of Leonor and Eduardo three centuries ago. Confused and tormented by these dreams, which become more disturbing every day, Diana consults Irene del Conde (Alma Muriel), a renowned psychiatrist. Irene has a romantic relationship with Omar Santelmo (Alejandro Camacho), a recognized physician in parapsychology studies. Omar is the nephew of Ernesto Santelmo (Rafael Baledón), the owner and CEO of Santelmo Digital, one of the leading computing companies in Latin America. Ernesto is a widower and had no children. Although Omar hates his uncle, he hopes to become his heir.

Ernesto Santelmo hires Mario Villarreal (Jorge Martínez), a prestigious Argentine computer engineer. Mario has an interesting project in mind: a minicomputer. Ernesto Santelmo and his company plan to support Mario's project, which they hope will be a huge success. Omar and Irene decide to discover all the secrets behind Ernesto and Mario's project and for their perverse purposes they decide to use Diana, whose mental powers will help them stay one step ahead.

Diana discovers a photograph of Mario in a newspaper and recognizes him as the man she sees in her dreams (Eduardo). Meanwhile, to please his nephew, Ernesto decides to open a clinic for parapsychological studies that will be administered by Omar. With Irene's help, Omar begins to treat Diana and soon begins to seduce her in order to have her under his control.

Irene makes a trip to Zacatecas. On her way back to Mexico City, suffers a serious motor vehicle accident. While Irene is unconscious, she has a series of dreams and revelations. When she wakes up, Irene discovers the truth: she is the reincarnation of Lucrecia Treviño. She also discovers that Diana and Mario are the reincarnation of Leonor and Eduardo. Irene discovers that her true purpose is to separate them again, destroy Diana and have Mario's love at any cost. With the help of Jordana (Patricia Reyes Spíndola), a mysterious woman she met in her convalescence, Irene begins to orchestrate a series of intrigues to fulfill her evil purpose.

Mario finds an old portrait of Leonor de Santiago and falls in love with her, as if he had always known her. Diana and Mario finally meet and fall in love immediately. From then on, both have to circumvent a series of intrigues that prevent them from being together. Its main threat is Irene. Diana will also have to discover her true identity, learn to use and master her powers, and prevent her love for Mario from being interrupted again.

== Cast ==
- Lucía Méndez as Diana Salazar / Doña Leonor de Santiago
- Jorge Martinez as Mario Villareal / Don Eduardo Carbajal
- Alejandro Camacho as Dr. Omar Santelmo
- Alma Muriel as Dr. Irene del Conde / Lucrecia Treviño
- Adriana Roel as Delfina García de Salazar
- Ariadne Welter as Gloria Morrison / Gloria Escandón
- Patricia Reyes Spíndola as Jordana Nuñez
- Carlos Cámara as Luther Henrich / Franz Webber
- Chela Nájera as Fidelia "Nela" Velasco
- Fernando Sáenz as Rodrigo Enríquez
- Rosa María Bianchi as Malena Salazar
- Mario Casillas as Gonzalo Obregón
- Rafael Velasco as Enrique Falcón
- Alejandro Tommasi as Adrián Alfaro
- Lolita Cortés as Elizabeth 'Liz' Morrison / Elizabeth 'Liz' Escandón
- Rebeca Manríquez as Marisela Rocha
- Alejandra Peniche as Mónica Uzeta
- Beatriz Martínez as Clara 'Clarita'
- Julio Aldama as Tobías
- Ricardo Lizama as Ignacio Galván
- Carlos Magaña as Teniente Juan Manuel Amezcua
- Alonso Echánove as Rafael Romero
- Arturo Beristain as Dr. Ronaldo de Juan
- Rafael Baledon as Ing. Ernesto Santelmo
- Rosa Furman as Madame Morett
- Enrique Hidalgo as Dr. Víctor Fortes
- César Arias as Dr. Agustín Tamayo
- Yula Pozo as Teresa
- Anaís de Melo as Yoko
- Lourdes Canale as Emma
- Clementina Gaudi as Irma
- Ramón Menéndez as Jaime Ortiz Lajous
- Jorge Pais as Don Manuel Leal
- Héctor Pons as Eugenio
- Tara Parra as Doña Constanza de Santiago
- José Luis Carol as Don Álvaro de Santiago
- Ella Laboriel as Casilda
- Mario Sauret as Rodrigo Cervantes de Benavente
- Eduardo Borja as Reverendo Williams

== Awards and nominations ==
Year	Award	Category	Nominee	Result
1989	7th TVyNovelas Awards	Best Telenovela	Carlos Téllez	Nominated
1989	7th TVyNovelas Awards	Best Actress	Lucía Méndez	Nominated
1989	7th TVyNovelas Awards	Best Actor	Jorge Martínez	Nominated
1989	7th TVyNovelas Awards	Best Antagonist Actress	Alma Muriel	Nominated
1989	7th TVyNovelas Awards	Best Experienced Actress	Adriana Roel	Nominated
