= Lo blanco y lo negro =

Mexican telenovela

- Genre: Telenovela
- Created by: Fernanda Villeli
- Written by: Fernanda Villeli
- Directed by: Julio Castillo; Phillip Armand Peña
- Starring: Ernesto Alonso; Lupita D'Alessio; Elsa Aguirre; Marco Muñoz; Mariana Levy; Sebastián Ligarde; Omar Fierro
- Opening theme: ¿Quién te crees tú? by Lupita D'Alessio
- Country of origin: Mexico
- Original language: Spanish
- No. of episodes: 140

Production
- Executive producer: Ernesto Alonso
- Production locations: Mexico City, D.F., Mexico
- Cinematography: Jesús Acuña Lee

Original release
- Network: Canal de las Estrellas
- Release: April 17 – October 27, 1989

Lo blanco y lo negro (English title: The white and black) is a Mexican telenovela produced by Ernesto Alonso for Televisa in 1989.

Ernesto Alonso starred as protagonist, while together Lupita D'Alessio and Elsa Aguirre starred as stellar performances.

== Plot ==
Ángel de Castro is one of the most powerful men in Mexico. He is married to Carolina, beautiful woman devoted to her home and children, that Angel would not change for anyone, but that does not stop taking the woman who pleases. Angel and Carolina are parents of Alicia, Alma, Armando and Andrés. The two men are on the verge of graduating: Armando, the first-born and the favourite, will be lawyer, and Andrés performs its social service in an agricultural field of experimentation.

== Cast ==
- Ernesto Alonso as Ángel de Castro/Silvio de Castro
- Lupita D'Alessio as Verónica Montes
- Elsa Aguirre as Carolina de Castro
- Marco Muñoz as Armando de Castro
- Mariana Levy as Alma de Castro
- Sebastián Ligarde as Andrés de Castro
- Omar Fierro as Raúl Alcázar
- Guillermo Murray as Guillermo Alcázar
- Rafael Amador as César Morelli
- Ana Luisa Peluffo as Odette
- Emilia Carranza as Raquel de Alcázar
- Rafael Sánchez Navarro as Roberto Olmedo
- Marcela Páez as Alicia de Castro
- Jorge Vargas as Julio Cantú
- Isabela Corona as Citalli
- Vicky de la Piedra as Felisa
- Miguel Manzano as Don Carlos
- Merle Uribe as Elena
- Felicia Mercado as Deborah Laval
- Oscar Bonfiglio as Javier Bautista
- Nailea Norvind as Selma Alcázar
- Mauricio Ferrari as Carlos Carvajal
- Mario Casillas as Ramón Ferreira
- Raquel Olmedo as Soledad
- Julio Ahuet as El Manoplas
- María Marcela as Irene O'Neal
- Fernando Robles as Jacinto Figueredo
- María Eugenia Ríos as Raymunda
- Roberto Cobo as Pepe Mateos
- Cecilia Romo as Cristina Carvajal
- Tony Bravo as Luis Soto
- Toño Infante as Cipriano Sánchez
- Mario de Jesús Garfiel as El Mudo
- Adalberto Parra as Esteban
- Carlos Cardán as Juan
- Cornelio Laguna as Samuel
- Ángel Carpinteyro as Jorge
- Ángeles Marín as María
- Clementina Gaudi as Esther
- Martha Patricia as Jeanette
- Ramón Menéndez as René Laval
- Héctor Sáez as Teniente Larios
- Felipe González as Jaime
- María Rojo as Andrea
- Gilberto Román as Tony
- Armando Sandoval as Víctor
- Giovanni Korporal as Sr. Lewis
- María Regina as Marcia
- María Sarfatti as Dr. Ruiz
- Roberto Ruy as El Asesino
- Lucy Cantú as Clara
- Mario Sauret as Rey
- Lucía Castell as Consuelo
- Marina Marín as La Criolla
- Rigoberto Carmona as El Poeta
- Rossy Navarro as La Prieta

== Awards ==
Year	Award	Category	Nominee	Result
1990	8th TVyNovelas Awards	Best Leading Actor	Ernesto Alonso	Won
