= El maleficio 2: Los enviados del infierno =

- Directed by: Raúl Araiza
- Written by: Raúl Araiza
- Based on: El maleficio
- Starring: Ernesto Alonso; Eduardo Yáñez; Lucía Méndez
- Cinematography: José Ortiz Ramos
- Music by: Guillermo Méndez Guiú
- Production company: Televicine S.A. de C.V.
- Release date: 1986
- Running time: 110 minutes
- Country: Mexico
- Language: Spanish

El maleficio 2: Los enviados del infierno, is a Mexican supernatural horror film produced by Televicine S.A. de C.V. and directed by Raúl Araiza. It is a sequel to the telenovela El maleficio. It stars Ernesto Alonso, Eduardo Yáñez and Lucía Méndez.

== Synopses ==
Enrique de Martino wants to locate Gabriel's haunted painting and looks for Rossetel, but since he has died he goes to his nephew Abel, who informs him that the painting is in a gallery, and tells him that when he finished painting it he lost his sight, so he believes that Gabriel has supernatural powers. A teacher of Gabriel tries to prevent it from Enrique. He meets Marcela, Gabriel's sister, and hypnotizes her so that she falls in love with him. She tells him that Gabriel's mother was pregnant by a strange being and that when she gave birth she died.

== Cast ==
- Ernesto Alonso as Enrique de Martino
- Lucía Méndez as Marcela
- Eduardo Yáñez as Professor Andrés
- Manuel Ojeda as Abel Romo
- Juan Carlos Ruiz as Guillermo
- María Teresa Rivas as Aunt
- Alejandro Camacho as David
- Armando Araiza as Gabriel
- Maria Zarattini as Ornella

== Awards and nominations ==
Year	Award	Category	Nominated	Result
	Ariel Awards, Mexico			
	Ariel Awards, Mexico	Best Score	Guillermo Méndez Guiú	Won
	Ariel Awards, Mexico	Best Cinematography	José Ortiz Ramos	Nominated
