= Por amor (Mexican TV series) =

- Genre: Telenovela; Drama
- Created by: Rita Valencia; Manuel de la Rosa
- Directed by: Ernesto Arreola
- Starring: María Sorté; Manuel Ojeda; Adriana Roel; Carlos Cámara; Chela Nájera; Salvador Sánchez
- Opening theme: Por Amor by Juan Gabriel
- Country of origin: Mexico
- Original language: Spanish

Production
- Executive producer: Irene Sabido
- Production company: Televisa

Original release
- Network: Canal de las Estrellas
- Release: 1981

Por amor (For love) is a Mexican telenovela produced by Irene Sabido for Televisa in 1981. It is an original story by Rita Valencia and Manuel de la Rosa. It starred by María Sorté, Manuel Ojeda, Adriana Roel, Carlos Cámara, Chela Nájera and Salvador Sánchez.

== Cast ==
- María Sorté as Belén
- Manuel Ojeda as Ernesto
- Adriana Roel as Mercedes
- Carlos Cámara as Rosendo
- Chela Nájera as Josefina
- Salvador Sánchez as Cenobio
- Silvia Caos as Aurelia
- Rafael Sánchez Navarro as Sergio Antonio
- Aurora Clavel as Sabina
- Luis Rábago as Javier
- Lucha Altamirano as Lupita
- July Furlong as Marcia
- Fernando Rubio
- Bárbara Córcega as Rosita
- Marco Antonio Infante as Abelardo
- Alejandra Espejo as Leticia
- Evangelina Martínez as Nachita
- Maricruz Nájera as Julia
- Miguel Ángel Ferriz
- Eduardo Palomo
- Guillermo Orea as José María
- Amparo Arozamena as Luisa Fernanda
- Lucía Guilmáin as Paulina
- Carlos Bonavides as Félix
- María Luisa Coronel as Gudelia
- Ricardo de Loera as Luis
- Graciela Díaz de la Garza as Laura
- Rosa Elena Díaz as Teofilita
- Tita Greg as Carmen
- Mónica Miguel as Ramona
- Polo Ortín as Rafael
- Héctor Téllez as Dr. Jorge
- Juan Antonio Yáñez as Dr. Diego
