= Dos vidas =

Mexican telenovela series

- Genre: Telenovela; Romance; Drama
- Created by: Janete Clair
- Written by: Jorge Patiño
- Directed by: Benjamín Cann
- Starring: Rebecca Jones; Fernando Balzaretti; René Casados; Ari Telch; Mariana Garza; Guillermo García Cantú; Guillermo Orea
- Opening theme: Instrumental by Guillermo Méndez Guiú
- Country of origin: Mexico
- Original language: Spanish
- No. of episodes: 120

Production
- Executive producer: Eugenio Cobo
- Production locations: Mexico City, Mexico
- Production company: Televisa

Original release
- Network: Canal de las Estrellas
- Release: April 18 – September 30, 1988

Related
- El rincón de los prodigios (18:00) Tal como somos (18:30); Nuevo amanecer; Duas vidas (1976)

Dos vidas (English title: Double lifes) is a Mexican telenovela produced by Eugenio Cobo for Televisa in 1988. It is an original story by Janete Clair, adapted by Jorge Patiño and directed by Benjamín Cann.

Rebecca Jones and René Casados starred as protagonists, Elizabeth Dupeyrón and Guillermo García Cantú starred as co-protagonists, while Fernando Balzaretti starred as stellar performance.

== Plot ==
Teresa is a beautiful woman, born in Mazatlán, which may well seem like any other woman, but that really has to deal with an internal struggle over whether to rescue their individuality or resign themselves to the submissive life be imposed by a man. Displays the subjugation of women to men, whether or not voluntary.

== Cast ==
- Rebecca Jones as Teresa
- Fernando Balzaretti as Dr. Marcelo Ascencio
- René Casados as Dino Barbosa
- Ari Telch as Osvaldo "Vado" Palas
- Mariana Garza as Juliana Ascencio
- Guillermo García Cantú as Mauricio
- Guillermo Orea as Menelao Palas
- Manuel López Ochoa as Don Raúl
- Ana Bertha Lepe
- Mario León as Tulio Barbosa
- Rafael del Villar as Luis Carlos
- Lilia Michel as Doña Rosa
- Alicia Fahr as Claudia
- Mar Castro as Gilda
- Miguel Gómez Checa as Sena
- Bárbara Gil as Doña Leonor
- Rosa María Morett as Lucía
- Rocío Yaber as Sara
- Guy De Saint Cyr as Tomás Palas
- Elizabeth Dupeyrón as Sonia Palas
- Marcela Páez as Vera
- Julia Marichal as Mary
- Ana Silvia Garza
- David Ostrosky
- Gerardo Acuña
- Graciela Bernardos
- Magda Karina as Eloisa
- Jorge Patiño
- Guillermo Gil
- Edith Kleiman
- Gabriela Obregón as Selma
- Mauricio Zetina as Teo Palas
- Jorge Fegán
- Sergio Sánchez
- Graciela Orozco

== Awards ==
Year	Award	Category	Nominee	Result
1989	7th Premios TVyNovelas	Best Male Revelation	Ari Telch	Won
