= Querer volar =

Mexican telenovela

- Genre: Telenovela
- Created by: Marissa Garrido
- Directed by: Aldo Monti
- Starring: Rocío Banquells; Humberto Zurita
- Opening theme: Querer volar by Rocío Banquells
- Country of origin: Mexico
- Original language: Spanish
- No. of episodes: 20

Production
- Executive producer: Patricia Lozano
- Running time: 30 minutes

Original release
- Network: Canal de las Estrellas
- Release: 1980

Querer volar (English title: Want to fly) is a Mexican telenovela produced by Patricia Lozano for Televisa in 1980.

== Cast ==
- Rocío Banquells as Erika
- Humberto Zurita as Daniel
- Maria Eugenia Rios as Dolores
- Manolita Saval as Paquita
- Agustin Sauret as Javier
- Maribel Fernandez as Barbara
- Sonia Esquivel as Susana
- Daniel Martin as Lus Felipe
- Martha Elena Cervantes as Rebeca
- Rafael Santa Cruz as Jose Luis
- Mari Carmen Martinez as Cecilia
