= Amor en silencio =

Mexican telenovela

- Genre: Telenovela; Romance; Drama
- Created by: Liliana Abud; Eric Vonn
- Written by: Liliana Abud; Eric Vonn; Marcia del Río
- Directed by: Miguel Córcega; Mónica Miguel
- Starring: Erika Buenfil; Arturo Peniche; Patricia Pereyra; Omar Fierro; Margarita Sanz; Joaquín Cordero; Elvira Monsell
- Theme music composer: Marco Antonio Solís
- Opening theme: Amor en silencio by Dulce
- Country of origin: Mexico
- Original language: Spanish
- No. of episodes: 115

Production
- Executive producer: Carla Estrada
- Cinematography: Alejandro Frutos; Carlos Manzano
- Running time: 41-44 minutes
- Production company: Televisa

Original release
- Network: Canal de las Estrellas
- Release: February 29 – August 5, 1988

Related
- Háblame de amor (1999); A que no me dejas (2015)

Amor en silencio (English title: Silent Love) is a Mexican telenovela produced by Carla Estrada for Televisa in 1988. Its first broadcast was in Mexico in 1988 and then made its debut in Latin America, Europe, Asia and, in a unique situation, it was broadcast in the United States by Telemundo during primetime. It can be said that this is the only Televisa telenovela that was never shown on Univision. Back then Telemundo got the rights to Amor en silencio and Pasión y poder, the latter one got picked up by Univision in 1993 as daytime programming.

The 1st part of the telenovela was starred by Erika Buenfil and Arturo Peniche while Margarita Sanz, Elvira Monsell and Joaquín Cordero starred as antagonists.

The 2nd part of the telenovela was starred by Erika Buenfil and Omar Fierro while Margarita Sanz, Elvira Monsell, Alberto Mayagoitía, Alberto Estrella, Rosa Furman and Ada Carrasco starred as antagonists.

== Plot ==
Marisela is a rich, beautiful, and intelligent woman who feels a big emptiness in her life that she considers dry and sad. It is then that she meets Fernando, a good and honest man from a great family. When the two fall in love, the two of them face the terrible opposition of their families. On one hand, it's Marisela's father Miguel, who doesn't want Fernando to be part of his family and wants something better for his daughter.

On the other part, it's Fernando's sister Mercedes, who is obsessed with him and doesn't want to see him with anyone other than Paola, Marisela's sister, who becomes infatuated with Fernando and is not willing to let him be with her sister. Marisela, tired of everything and everyone, decides not to listen to anything or anyone and decides to be with the love of her life and has a daughter she names Ana. Terrified of what may come, Marisela asks Fernando to get married as soon as possible and on the day of the wedding, Mercedes goes crazy upon learning about it and takes a gun and murders Marisela and Fernando at the Ocampo family mansion, when they prepare to celebrate their wedding party.

In the middle of the shooting, Marisela's mother Andrea also dies from cardiac arrest. Several years later, Ana (the daughter of the deceased couple), who grew up locked up in a boarding school in the United States, returns to Mexico accompanied by Sandy, her companion in the boarding school and has become her great friend. Ana returns to her grandpa and aunt's house and has grown up into a woman looking physically identical to her mother. This similarity causes Miguel to feel remorse for not having listened to his daughter when she was alive and wants to fix his mistakes by welcoming Ana and giving all of his grandfatherly affection to her.

On the other hand, Paola looks down on her niece with contempt for having the failed love that took her sister. Angel, the adoptive son of Miguel and Andrea, is a deaf-mute man who has been in love with Ana since childhood, but suffers an ordeal in which he can't express his love towards Ana. However, he decides to fight for her love but it is too late. Ana gets engaged to Diego, who only wants to use her to get revenge on his father. Diego's father turns out to be Miguel, because while Miguel was married to Andrea he had an extramarital relationship with Elena in the United States.

This resulted in them having two sons: Diego and Tomas. Diego grew up feeling resentment towards his father, for his brother and mother were "the others" and Miguel never dared to acknowledge them. Diego's resentment was fueled mainly by his ambitious maternal grandmother Ada, who took care of tarnishing Miguel and his legitimate family and used his daughter to blackmail him and to extort money despite opposition from Elena, who was aware of what her place was in Miguel's life and was never interested in demanding something.

Therefore, their children Tomas and Diego turn out to be Marisela's brothers and Ana's uncles. However, in addition to all these obstacles, the real important one to face Ana and Angel's love is Ana's crazed aunt Mercedes, who has escaped from the mental hospital where she had been locked up all these years and only seeks revenge. Upon seeing Ana, Mercedes thinks she's her late mother Marisela and believes she was saved from the attack years ago, so she decides to "put an end" to her once and for all.

== Cast ==
- Erika Buenfil as Marisela Ocampo Trejo/Ana Silva Ocampo
- Arturo Peniche as Fernando Silva
- Omar Fierro as Angel Trejo
- Joaquín Cordero as Miguel Ocampo
- Margarita Sanz as Mercedes Silva
- Saby Kamalich as Andrea Trejo de Ocampo
- Patricia Pereyra as Sandy Grant
- Elvira Monsell as Paola Ocampo Trejo
- José Elías Moreno as José María Durán
- Alberto Estrella as Pedro
- Carlos Espejel as Aníbal
- Oscar Morelli as Julián Durán
- Isabel Martinez "La Tarabilla" as Martina
- Olivia Bucio as Elena Robles
- Laura León as Alejandra
- Lucha Moreno as Consuelo de Durán
- Fernando Balzaretti as Jorge Trejo
- Alejandra Maldonado as Mayra Zambrano
- Edgardo Gazcon as Tomás Ocampo Robles
- Alberto Mayagoitia as Diego Ocampo Robles
- Rafael Rojas as Sebastián
- Cynthia Klitbo as Aurora
- Claudia Guzman as Gaby
- Miguel Macía as Roberto
- Marina Marín as Olivia
- Aurora Alonso as Gudelia
- Patricia Martinez as Olga
- Fabiola Elenka Tapia as Ana (young)
- Juan Bernardo Gazca as Ángel (teenager)
- Rodrigo Ramón as Ángel (young)
- Luis Rábago as Carlos
- Marta Aura as Celia
- Bárbara Córcega as Mindys
- Ada Carrasco as Ada vda. de Robles
- Mauricio Ferrari as Anthony Grant
- Jaime Lozano as Chucho
- Rosa Furman as Rosario
- Blanca Sánchez as Producer
- Alaska as Herself
- Enrique Gilabert as Nicolás
- Rafaello as Marcelo
- Raquel Morell as Lizbeth
- María Montaño as Luciana
- Morenita as Linda
- Marcela Davilland as Elvira de Zambrano
- Mauricio Armando as Tomás (young)
- Ricardo de Loera as Agent of Police
- Ana María Aguirre as Mercedes's Psychiatrist

== Awards ==
Year	Award	Category	Nominee	Result
1989	7th TVyNovelas Awards	Best Telenovela of the Year	Carla Estrada	Won
1989	7th TVyNovelas Awards	Best Actor	Arturo Peniche	Nominated
1989	7th TVyNovelas Awards	Best Young Lead Actress	Erika Buenfil	Won
1989	7th TVyNovelas Awards	Best Young Lead Actor	Omar Fierro	Nominated
1989	7th TVyNovelas Awards	Best Antagonist Actress	Margarita Sanz	Won
1989	7th TVyNovelas Awards	Best Actor Experienced	Joaquín Cordero	Won
1989	7th TVyNovelas Awards	Best Female Revelation	Elvira Monsell	Won
1989	7th TVyNovelas Awards	Best Original Story or Adaptation	Liliana Abud; Eric Vonn	Won
