= Appearances Are Deceptive =

- Directed by: Jaime Humberto Hermosillo
- Written by: Jaime Humberto Hermosillo
- Produced by: Jaime Humberto Hermosillo
- Starring: Isela Vega; Gonzalo Vega; Manuel Ojeda
- Cinematography: Ángel Goded
- Edited by: Rafael Castanedo; Rafael Ceballos
- Release date: March 24, 1983
- Country: Mexico
- Language: Spanish

Appearances Are Deceptive (In Spanish: Las apariencias engañan) is a 1983 Mexican comedy drama film directed by Jaime Humberto Hermosillo and starring Isela Vega, Gonzalo Vega and Manuel Ojeda. The movie was filmed in 1977 and was supposed to be released in 1978. However, due to its explicit content, it was censored and wasn't released until 1983.

== Plot ==
Rogelio (Gonzalo Vega), a relatively inexperienced actor, is approached in Mexico City by the architect Sergio (Manuel Ojeda). Sergio hires Rogelio to travel to Aguascalientes and impersonate Adrián, the long-lost son of Don Alberto (Ignacio Retes), an elderly and paraplegic man who uses a wheelchair. Don Alberto is cared for by Adriana (Isela Vega), a distant niece who mysteriously appeared in his home one day. Sergio and Adriana wish to marry, but they are unable to do so because Don Alberto opposes the idea, fearing he would be left alone. To ensure Don Alberto is not left alone during their absence, they hire Rogelio to pose as Adrián. Sergio explains to Rogelio that Adrián disappeared from his father's life as a teenager. Over the years, Adriana have maintained a web of lies to deceive Don Alberto, including fabricating a trip to Spain where they previously hired another actor to impersonate Adrián. Rogelio accepts the job due to his dire financial situation.

Upon arriving in Aguascalientes, Sergio and Adriana welcome Rogelio and provide him with the final details for the impersonation. However, a complication arises with the presence of the nosy Yolanda (Margarita Isabel), another niece of Don Alberto. Yolanda is suspicious of Adriana, whom she does not remember. When Don Alberto grabs Sergio's genitals, Yolanda tells him that when Adrian was little, Don Alberto used to tell everyone he was a girl. However, she insists that he must now be certain that wasn't true.

Rogelio begins to interact very closely with Adriana and Sergio, supporting Adriana in managing Don Alberto's business, which she handles with great success. Soon, however, Rogelio develops a strong attraction toward Adriana. This attraction is mutual, but Adriana hides her feelings, partly out of loyalty to Sergio. One day, Adriana can no longer resist and visits Rogelio in his room, where they engage in oral sex.

Complications deepen when Sergio also begins to express romantic interest in Rogelio. He kisses Rogelio in the showers of a sports club, but Rogelio pushes him away and warns him never to try that again.

Rogelio pressures Adriana to have sex, but she refuses. Fearing his reaction to her intersexuality, she tells him she wants to preserve her virginity until marriage. "I think you are defective," he says. "I am perfect!" she replies. "But I have to keep up appearances." (This exchange takes place in one of Don Alberto's clothing shops while Rogelio helps Adriana handle a naked mannequin with no genitals.)

After a party at home, Rogelio insists that there are many things they could do without her losing her virginity. In the next scene, she ties him up and rides him cowboy style.

Later Rogelio confesses his love to Adriana, but she insists on maintaining her engagement to Sergio. At this point, Rogelio tells Adriana about what happened in the showers. The marriage arrangement is dissolved.

Before leaving on a long trip, Sergio invites Rogelio to join him and attempts to kiss him again, but Rogelio rejects him, declaring his love for Adriana. "You're going to experience a lot of surprises with Adriana," Sergio warns Rogelio. "She and Adrian are the same person." "I know," Rogelio replies. "Don Alberto didn't know Adrian's real gender. When the breasts started to grow, he... she had to leave."

Adriana asks Rogelio to return to Mexico City, explaining that things have changed and she no longer needs his services. Rogelio refuses, but Adriana begins to avoid him. Desperate for her attention, Rogelio continues to act as Adrian and goes to the shops, giving the workers outrageous raises. In response, Adriana bans him from entering any of the shops.

One night, Rogelio visits Daniel's beauty salon. Daniel (Roberto Cobo) is the hairdresser, close friend, and confidant of Adriana. Rogelio tells Daniel he allegedly knows Adriana's secret: Adrian doesn't exist. He claims that Adriana didn't need his services because of the marriage but because Don Alberto's fortune is under Adrian's name. Rogelio is wrong, but Daniel says nothing.

Suddenly, a secret door opens, and someone runs out. Rogelio enters, searching for Adriana. When he finds her, she finally reveals her secret: they have a penis, they are intersex. "I am both Adriana and Adrian," they declare emphatically, repeating it over and over.

In the next scene, Adriana/Adrian is penetrating Rogelio from behind, who appears visibly uncomfortable. They whisper in his ear, "Don't be so tense!"

In the end, they get married, and the charade continues...

== Cast ==
- Isela Vega as Adriana / Adrián
- Gonzalo Vega as Rogelio
- Manuel Ojeda as Sergio
- Ignacio Retes as Don Alberto
- Margarita Isabel as Yolanda
- Roberto Cobo as Daniel
- Salvador Pineda as Salvador
- La Xóchitl as Herself

== Production ==
The film was shot over a period of three months from November 1977 to January 1978 using 16mm cameras. Locations included Aguascalientes and Mexico City. The film was first screened at the Instituto Francés de América Latina in Mexico City, but due to censorship it did not have a commercial release until 1983.

== Sources ==
- Hermosillo, Jaime Humberto (1981). "Prólogo". La pasión según Berenice. Katún. ISBN 9684300069.
- Díaz Mendiburo, Aaraón (2004). Los hijos homoeróticos de Jaime Humberto Hermosillo. Plaza y Valdés. ISBN 9789707222748.
- Villaseñor, Arturo (2002). Jaime Humberto Hermosillo en el país de las apariencias. CONACULTA Cineteca Nacional. ISBN 9789706516909.
