= Rafael Sánchez Navarro =

Mexican actor

Rafael Sánchez Navarro (born 1958) is a Spanish-Mexican actor. He is the son of Manolo Fábregas, an actor from Spain who established himself in Mexico.

== Biography ==
Navarro grew up in a family of actors. Seeing his relatives on television, film studios, and interviews, he was introduced to the world of show business early on.

Following his father's footsteps, at the age of twenty-two, Sanchez Navarro played a supporting role in the 1980 telenovela Secretos de Confesion (Secrets to Confess). He did not work in telenovelas again until 1982's Por Amor (For Love). In 1983, he acted in Manana es Primavera (Tomorrow it Will Be Spring), Cuarteto Para el fin del Tiempo (A Quartet Until the End), Bodas de Odio (Hate Wedding), and Cazador de Demonios (Demon Hunter).

He played Orson, a feature character, in 1988's El Pecado de Oyuki (Oyuki's Sin).

He participated in only one episode of 1989's Cita con la Muerte (Date with Death). Afterwards, he acted in small roles in three more soap operas, before playing Adolfo Degollado in 1991's El Teatro del Horror (Horror Theatre). He followed that up by playing Rodolfo Olmedo in 1992's Lo Blanco y lo Negro (Black and White), and Renato in 1993's Valentina, another telenovela.

Sanchez Navarro rose to fame after playing Santiago Ugalde, a criminal millionaire and show business representative, in 1994's Volver a Empezar, alongside actors Yuri (who played Santiago's girlfriend), Chayanne, Eduardo Changerotti, and Guillermo García Cantú.

Volver A Empezar released a soundtrack CD, where Chayanne, Yuri and Changerotti sang. The soap opera gave Sanchez Navarro popularity in more countries such as Argentina, Puerto Rico, the United States, Israel, and Russia.

After finding success, Sanchez Navarro was moved to Televisa's rival, TV Azteca. He became one of that network's first bonafide celebrities when he signed a contract with the channel. Towards the end of 1994, he recorded Peor es Nada, which was also seen in Hong Kong with the name Better Than Nothing.

== Filmography ==
List of appearances in television series and specials
Year	Title	Role	Notes
1980	Secreto de confesión		Television debut
1982	Por amor		
1982	Mañana es primavera		
1983	Bodas de odio		
1985	Juana Iris	Cristóbal	
1986	El engaño	Rodrigo	
1988	El pecado de Oyuki	Orson	
1989	Lo blanco y lo negro	Roberto Olmedo	
1989	Hora marcada	Luis	Episode: "No estoy jugando"
1991	Milagro y magia	Carlos Andrade	
1993	Valentina	Renato Saldívar	
1994	Volver a empezar	Santiago Ugalde	
1996	Te dejaré de amar	Juan Santos Elizalde	
1997	La chacala	Joaquín García	
1998	Amor infiel	Miguel Ángel Castañeda	
2002	Por tí		
2003	Dos chicos de cuidado en la ciudad	Felipe Medina Páez / Mephisto Páez	
2006	Ángel, las alas del amor	Fernando Blanco	
2008	Tengo todo excepto a ti	Ernesto	
2009	Pobre Diabla	Horacio Rodríguez	
2011	Emperatriz	Manuel León	
2012	Los Rey	Atilio Herrán	
2013	Vivir a destiempo	Martín Campos	
2014	Siempre tuya Acapulco	Armando Balmaceda	
2015	Caminos de Guanajuato	Javier Zamora	
2016	Dios Inc.	Salvador Pereyra	12 episodes
2016–17	La candidata	Alonso	
2016–17	La Doña	Jaime Aguirre	
2018	Enemigo Intimo	Borges	
