= Parecido al amor =

Mexican telenovela

- Genre: Telenovela
- Created by: Original Story: Irma Yaniré; Julio Porter; Adaptation: Carmen Daniels
- Directed by: Raúl Araiza Sr.
- Starring: Tina Romero; Carlos East
- Country of origin: Mexico
- Original language: Spanish
- No. of seasons: 1
- No. of episodes: 20

Production
- Executive producer: José Morris

Original release
- Network: Canal de las Estrellas
- Release: 1979

Parecido al amor is a Mexican telenovela produced by José Morris for Televisa in 1979.

== Cast ==
- Tina Romero as Alondra
- Carlos East as Enrique
- Manuel Ojeda as Diego
- Gerardo del Castillo as Ignacio
- Leon Escobar as Dr.Osorio
- Jose Alonso Cano as Padre Basilio
- María Martín as Rosa Guadalupe
- Irma Yaniré
- José Marti
- Alberto Insua
- Enrique Beraza
