= Manuel Ojeda =

Mexican actor (1940–2022)

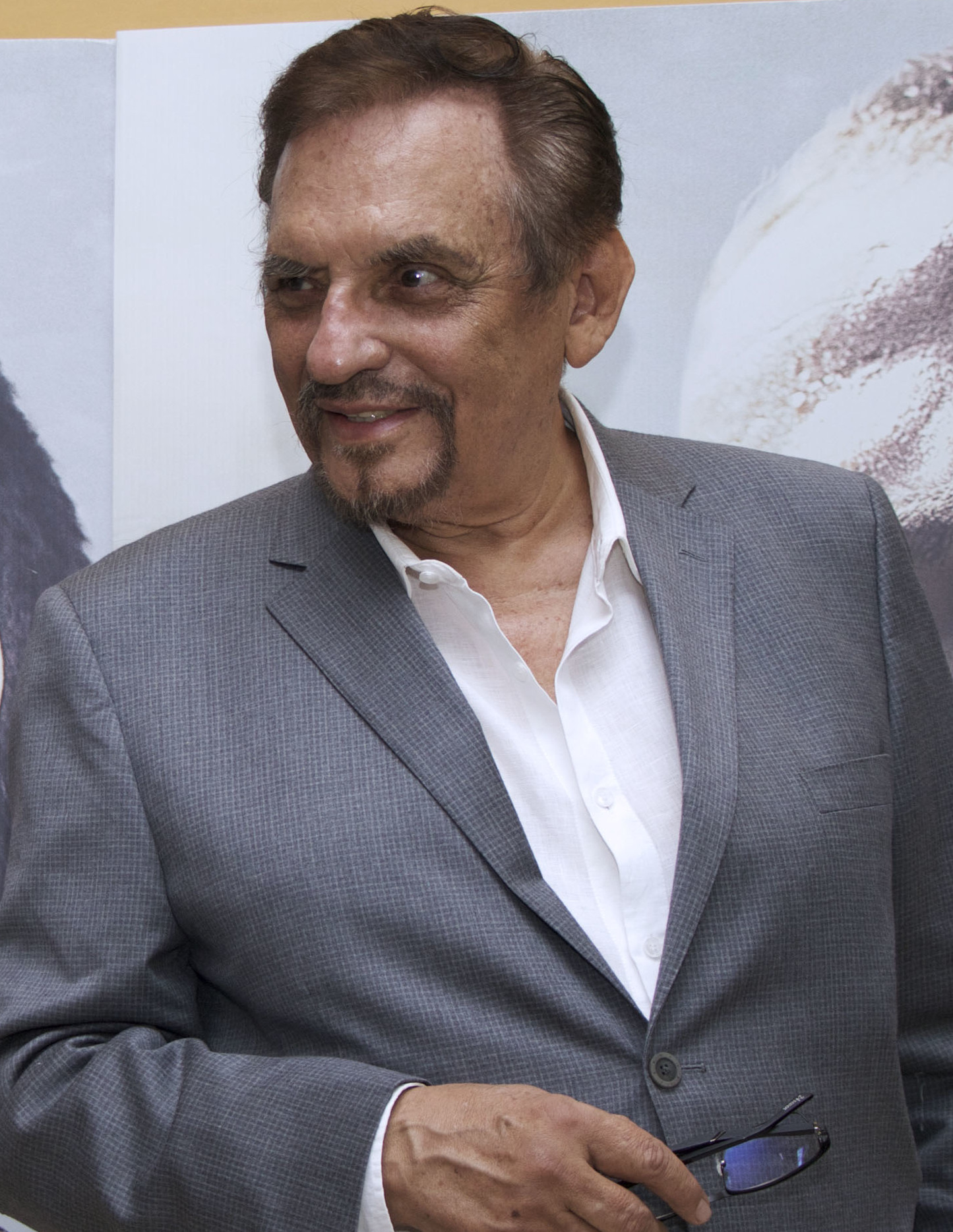
- Ojeda in 2018
- Born: Manuel Salvador Ojeda Armenta; 4 November 1940; La Paz, Baja California Sur, Mexico
- Died: 11 August 2022 (aged 81)
- Occupation: Actor
- Years active: 1975–2022

Manuel Salvador Ojeda Armenta (4 November 1940 – 11 August 2022) was a Mexican actor. Ojeda was one of the most active actors of television and cinema in Mexico. He played the villain, Zolo, in the Hollywood film Romancing the Stone.

== Career ==
Manuel Salvador Ojeda Armenta was born in La Paz, Baja California Sur. He studied acting at the Instituto de Bellas Artes ("Institute of Fine Arts") and started his career in theatre. He obtained roles in his first film in his mid-thirties and later participated in the first of his dozens of telenovelas with Televisa two years later.

In 1979, he appeared in his first English-language production, the 1979 Martin Sheen film Eagle's Wing. He also took the role of Jimmy in P.D. Tu gato ha muerto, the Spanish-language production of P.S. Your Cat Is Dead in 1983. The same year, Ojeda starred in Jaime Humberto Hermosillo's Las apariencias engañan as Sergio, a closeted gay man. Ojeda played the murderous secret police commander Zolo in the Hollywood film Romancing the Stone (1984). Co-star Kathleen Turner served as his interpreter during filming as director Robert Zemeckis spoke no Spanish.

On television, Ojeda portrayed Emiliano Zapata in the telenovela Senda de gloria in 1987 and Porfirio Díaz in El vuelo del águila in 1994. In 1994, he began to focus on his television career, eventually appearing in over 45 television series. From 2005 to 2006, he was part of the cast of the telenovela Alborada.

== Health issues and death ==
In the later years of his life, Ojeda reported that he suffered from depression when he was not working. While he was filming Corazón guerrero in 2022, he began to experience symptoms of liver disease, including anorexia. His health deteriorated quickly over the course of two months and he died on 11 August 2022.

== Filmography ==
=== Films ===
Year	Title	Role	Notes
1974	Calzonzin inspector		
1975	La casa del Sur	Livingston	
1976	Canoa	Hombre del pueblo	
1976	El Apando		
1976	Celestina	Pleberio	
1976	Celda de castigo	Polonio	
1976	La pasión según Berenice	José	
1976	Las Poquianchis	Tadeo	
1977	El elegido	Andrés Martínez	
1977	El mar		
1977	Matinée	Francisco	
1977	Los Iracundos		Short film
1978	Pedro Páramo	Pedro Páramo	
1978	Naufragio	Médico	
1979	Amor libre	Ernesto	
1979	Eagle's Wing	Miguel	
1979	La tía Alejandra	Rodolfo	
1981	Que viva Tepito!	Antonio Vélez	
1981	Green Ice	Lt. Costas	
1981	La leyenda de Rodrígo		
1981	Oficio de tinieblas	Fernando Ulloa	
1981	El infierno de todos tan temido	Jacinto Chontal	
1981	Fuego en el mar	Mariano Ortega	
1981	Ora sí tenemos que ganar		
1982	Yo no lo se de cierto, lo supongo	Daniel	
1982	El caballito volador		
1983	Un hombre llamado el diablo		
1983	Las apariencias engañan		
1983	Los renglones torcidos de Dios		
1983	Bajo la metralla	Pablo	
1984	Noche de carnaval	Diablo	
1984	El corazón de la noche	Leyva	
1984	Romancing the Stone	Colonel Zolo	
1984	El tonto que hacía milagros	Asaltante	
1985	Luna caliente	Almiron	
1985	Naná	Conde Muffat	
1986	El maleficio 2: Los enviados del infierno	Abel Romo	
1986	The Rebellion of the Hanged		
1986	Al filo de la ley: Misión rescate	Víctor Araiza	
1987	La mujer policía		
1987	Muelle rojo	Isauro Alfaro Otero	
1987	Los confines	Ignacio	
1988	La otra cara de Pedro Navaja	Don Mario	
1988	Reto a la vida	El Tijuana	
1988	La furia de un dios		
1988	Furia en la sangre		
1989	Un lugar en el sol	Andrès	
1989	Las dos caras de la muerte		
1990	El hijo de Lamberto Quintero		
1991	La fuerza bruta		
1991	El extensionista	Severo	
1991	Triste recuerdo	Don Manuel Jiménez	
1991	Traición		
1991	El jinete de la divina providencia		
1991	Mí querido viejo		
1991	Amor y venganza		
1991	Imperio blanco		
1992	El último narco		
1992	La revancha	Gallardo	
1992	El secuestro de un periodista	Presidente	
1992	Mi querido Tom Mix	Evaristo	
1992	Cabaret de frontera		
1992	Nocturno a Rosario		
1993	Vigilante nocturno		
1993	Retando a la muerte	Comandante Moreno	
1993	Bestias humanas	Comandante Peña	
1993	Kino	Jefe Coro	
1993	En medio de la nada		
1993	Tiempo de muerte		
1994	Seducción judicial		
1994	Gladiadores del infierno		
1994	Juana la Cubana		
1994	El hombre de Blanco	José	
1994	Muralla de tinieblas		
1994	La señorita		
1994	Amorosos fantasmas		
1994	Amor que mata		
1994	Pánico en el paraíso		
1994	Suerte en la vida (La Lotería III)		
1994	Las pasiones del poder	Jorge Toledo	
1994	La dinastía de Los Pérez	Erik Orozco	(final film role)

=== Television ===
Year	Title	Role	Notes
1978	Santa	Federico Gamboa	
1979	Parecido al amor		
1979	Cancionera	Héctor Raúl	
1980	La casa del árbol		
1981	El derecho de nacer	Armando	
1982	Por amor	Ernesto	
1983	El amor ajeno	Roberto	
1984	La traición	Pino Genovesi	
1985	Alfred Hitchcock Presents	General Vorteez	"Breakdown" (Season 1, Episode 8)
1985	De pura sangre	Carlos	
1986	On Wings of Eagles	Commandant	"Part II" (Season 1, Episode 2)
1986	Herencia maldita	Rogelio Velarde	
1987	Tal como somos		
1987	Senda de gloria	Emiliano Zapata	
1988	Un nuevo amanecer	Samuel	
1990	Un rostro en mi pasado	Leonardo Sánchez	
1990	Hora marcada	Tomás	Episode: "De ángeles y demonios"
1990	Yo compro esa mujer	Santiago	
1991	Al filo de la muerte	Julio Araujo	
1993	Videoteatros: Véngan corriendo que les tengo un muerto	Inspector Cueto	
1994–1995	El vuelo del águila	Porfirio Díaz	
1994–2003	Mujer, casos de la vida real	Various roles	"Ante el ocaso" (Season 10, Episode 12); "Una esperanza para Teodoro" (Season 13, Episode 41); "Pregunta sin respuesta" (Season 20, Episode 25)
1995	La paloma	Ramiro López Yergo	
1996	La culpa	Mariano Lagarde	
1997	No tengo madre	Indalecio Madrazo / Inocencio Lemus Smasht	
1997–1998	Desencuentro	Alfredo	
1999	Nunca te olvidaré		
1999	Amor gitano	Pedro	
1999–2000	Laberintos de pasión	Genaro Valencia	
1999–2000	Cuento de Navidad	Orejas	
2000–2001	El precio de tu amor	Octavio Rangel	
2001–2002	El manantial	Padre Salvador Valdés	
2002	La otra	Juan Pedro Portugal	
2003	Bajo la misma piel	Rodrigo Leyva	
2004	Amarte es mi pecado	Jacobo Guzmán	
2004	Misión S.O.S. aventura y amor	Severiano Martínez	
2005	Barrera de amor		
2005–2006	Alborada	Francisco Escobar	
2007	La fea más bella	Luis	
2007	Objetos perdidos	Rigoberto	"Objeto 3" (Season 1, Episode 3)
2007	El Pantera	Almeida	"Hoteles del centro" (Season 1, Episode 3)
2007	Tormenta en el paraíso	Capitán Solís	
2008–2009	Un gancho al corazón	Don Hilario Ochoa	
2009	Alma de hierro		"Angustiosa presencia" (Season 1, Episode 385)
2009	Verano de amor	Don Clemente Mata	
2009	Mujeres asesinas	Juan Antonio Orduña	"Las Garrido, codiciosas" (Season 2, Episode 2)
2009–2010	Corazón salvaje	Fulgencio Berron	
2011	El Equipo	Prieto Urrutia	
2012	Por ella soy Eva	Eduardo Moreno	
2012–2014	Como dice el dicho	Rodrigo / Vicente Cacho	"Uno nunca sabe para quién trabaja" (Season 2, Episode 59); "El amor no termina" (Season 4, Episode 3)
2013	Qué bonito amor	El Padrino	Supporting Role
2013	La Tempestad	Ernesto Contreras	
2014	La Gata	El Silencioso	Supporting Role
2015	Que te perdone Dios	Melitón	Supporting Role
2016	Yago	Damián Madrigal	Supporting Role
2020	Enemigo íntimo	Don Jesus	Main role (season 2)
2020–2021	Quererlo todo	Patricio Montes	Guest star
2022	Corazón guerrero	Abel	(final role)

== Awards and nominations ==
=== TVyNovelas Awards ===
Year	Category	Telenovela	Result
1986	Best Male Antagonist	De pura sangre	Nominated
1995	Best First Actor	El vuelo del águila	Nominated
2000	Best Male Antagonist	Laberintos de pasión	Won
2001	Best Co-star Actor	El precio de tu amor	Nominated
2002	Best First Actor	El manantial	Nominated
2006	Best First Actor	Alborada	Won
2009	Best First Actor	Tormenta en el paraíso	Nominated
2013	Best First Actor	Por Ella Soy Eva	Nominated
2014	Best Male Antagonist	La tempestad	Won
2015	Best First Actor	La Gata	Nominated

=== Premios El Heraldo de México ===
Year	Category	Telenovela	Result
1995	Best Actor	El vuelo del águila	Won
