= Francesca Cruz =

American actress

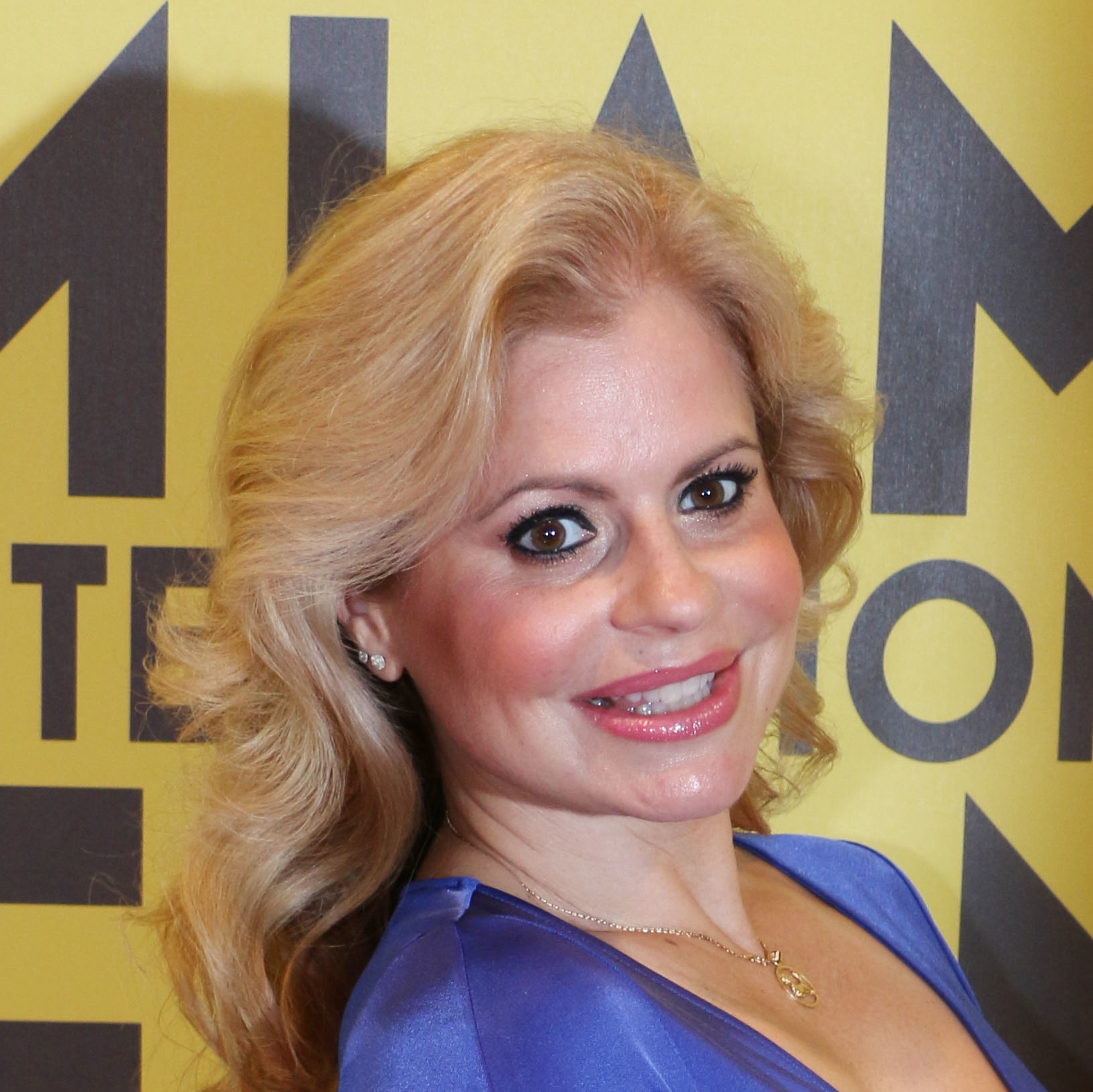
- Francesca Cruz (2014)
- Born: Francesca Cruz; Miami, Florida
- Occupations: Columnist, Editor, Actress
- Website: www.francescacruz.com

Francesca Cruz is an American actress and journalist.

== Biography ==
Born to Cuban parents and raised in South Florida, began her entertainment career at the age of 12, studying theater and dance and later becoming a model.

By 14, she had become the model host of Telemundo's celebrity game show, La Feria de la Alegria.

By the age of 19, Francesca was co-hosting the hip and avant music video program Onda Max, aired internationally by the Univision Network. With it came the opportunity to interview famed Hispanic artists Selena, Ricky Martin, Paulina Rubio, Gloria Estefan, Enrique Iglesias and Shakira.

Francesca then went on to become the youngest entertainment reporter on Telemundo's news show Ocurrio Asi.

For her participation in the film The Birdcage. she was awarded the prestigious Screen Actors Guild Award as Outstanding Cast Member in 1997. In 2014 she was chosen as one of the 10 Latino Leaders of the Future.

She has acted in productions such as Arli$$, South Beach, Los Teens, Lente Loco and Control.

After working on television, she moved on to print media. She took part in the creation and development of two national bi-monthly magazines, simultaneously published in English and Spanish. In her capacity as Production Director and later Managing Editor of another bi-monthly, Nueva Magazine, she has interviewed top Hispanic talent.

She received her Bachelor of Science Degree in Journalism and English Literature from the Florida International University, studied Art and Art History courses at La Sorbonne University of Paris, and moved to Mexico City in 2003 to pursue her master's degree in Anthropology under the respected program el Museo Nacional de Antropología (ongoing).

Francesca has had the opportunity to interview Arianna Huffington, Diane Rehm, Pete Hamill, Donna Karan, Salma Hayek, Carolina Herrera, William Levy and Isabel Allende.

Her work has been published in Home & Design, Florida InsideOut, Nueva Magazine, Ventitantos, The Miami Herald, Coral Gables Living, and Ocean Drive. Presently she is the Senior Editor for Brickell Magazine & Key Biscayne Magazine. and the Editor-in-Chief of Entrepreneur.wiki
