= Háblame de amor =

Mexican telenovela

- Created by: Eric Vonn
- Developed by: Azteca; Azteca Digital: Elisa Salinas; Juan David Burns
- Directed by: Luis Vélez; Martin Barraza
- Starring: Danna García; José Alonso; Mauricio Ochmann; Bruno Bichir; Julieta Egurrola
- Opening theme: "Eterna tu, eterna yo" by Amanda Miguel
- Ending theme: "Hablame de amor" by Danna García and Antonio Muñíz
- Country of origin: Mexico
- Original language: Spanish
- No. of episodes: 124

Production
- Producers: Luis Vélez; Rossana Arau
- Production locations: Mexico City, Mexico; Guadalajara
- Editor: Sigfrido Garcia
- Camera setup: Multi-camera
- Running time: 35-65 minutes
- Production company: TV Azteca

Original release
- Network: Azteca 13/Azteca America
- Release: 1999

Related
- Amor en silencio (1988); A que no me dejas (2015)

Háblame de amor (Let's Talk About Love) is a Mexican telenovela produced since 1999 by TV Azteca for Azteca Digital (now Azteca Estudios). It is a remake of Amor en silencio by Liliana Abud and Eric Vonn.

== Casting ==
The telenovela is divided into two major parts. The first part centers on Julia (Danna García) and Esteban (Bruno Bichir) as the protagonists, Max's (Ruben Delgadillo) recuperation and Guillermo's illegitimate children.

The second part features the love story between Max (now portrayed by Mauricio Ochmann) and Jimena (again, portrayed by Danna García) and Guillermo's grown up illegitimate children.

Fabian Corres portrays the eldest child, Rodrigo, in the first few episodes of the first part of the telenovela. He later portrays the youngest child, Carlos, in the second part.

Patricia Pereyra portrays Norma in this version, while in the 1988 version, she portrayed the role of Sandy Grant.

== Cast ==
Actor	Character	Description
Danna García	Julia Toledo Saldivar	Laura and Guillermo's daughter. In love with Esteban.
Danna García	Jimena Ortega Toledo	Julia and Esteban's daughter
Mauricio Ochmann	Maximiliano Toledo	Daniela's son. Rodrigo's adoptive son. In love with Jimena.(season 2)
Bruno Bichir	Esteban	Julia's husband (Season 1)
Jose Alonso	Guillermo Toledo	Father of Rodrigo, Norma, Julia, Sandra and Carlos.
Julieta Egurrola	Laura de Toledo	Mother of Rodrigo, Norma and Julia. (Season 1)
Aylin Mujica	Lucia	Julia's best friend. Alvaro's ex-wife. Armando's ex-lover
Patricia Pereyra	Norma Toledo	Julia's sister
Alma Delfina	Adriana	Esteban's possessive stepmother.
Fabian Corres; Camilo Beristáin; Rodrigo Zurita	Rodrigo Toledo	Guillermo and Laura's son.
Fabian Corres; Camilo Beristáin; Rodrigo Zurita	Carlos Toledo	Guillermo and Lourdes' son
Leonardo Daniel	Armando Aguilar	Rodrigo's boss. Had an affair with Lucia
Mayra Rojas	Lourdes Andrade	Guillermo's lover, later his wife. Mother of Sandra and Carlos
Fernando Becerril	Alonso Barragan	Esther's husband, Juan Manuel's father. Guillermo's best friend, associate and lawyer
Carmen Delgado	Esther de Barragan	Alonso's wife. Juan Manuel's mother. Laura's best friend
René Gatica	Sergio	Adriana's ex-husband. Esteban's stepfather
Gabriel Galván	Juan Manuel	Alonso and Esther's son. Obsessed with Julia's inheritance. (Season 1)
Óscar Flores	Adolfo "Nazi"	Adriana's younger brother. Helped Adriana to kill Esteban's father. Killed Max's parents
Carlos Torres Torrija	Álvaro	Son of Armando's friend. In love with Lucia
Antonio Muñiz	Víctor	Lourdes' younger brother. Juan Manuel's assistant. In love with Norma
José Carlos Rodríguez	Gumaro	Servants at Toledo's mansion. Regina's parents
Ana Karina Guevara	Lilia	Servants at Toledo's mansion. Regina's parents
Ximena Rubio	Daniela	Max's mother
Ana Laura Espinosa	Karina	Sergio colleague, later his wife
América Gabriel	Adela	
Miguel Couturier	Horacio	
Alejandro Ciangherotti	Pedro Andrade	Lourdes and Victor's alcoholic father.
Mark Tacher; Alexis Rodríguez; Alonso Rodríguez	Leo Aguilar	Armando's son. Likes Regina.
Flor Payán	Regina	Gumaro and Lilia's daughter
Elisa Reverter; Andrea Hays	Rossana	
Alejandro Gaytán	Juan Antonio	
Úrsula Pruneda; Mishelle Garfias; Samantha Veliz	Sandra	Guillermo and Lourdes' daughter. Carlos' elder sister.
Flavio Peniche	Muñeco	
Silverio Palacios	Pirulais "Pitufo"	Nazi's friend
Concepción Márquez	Aurora	
Fernando del Solar	El Suavecito	
Tania Viramontes	Mayté	
José Rodríguez		
Patrick Richaud	Juan Antonio	
Jorge Levy	Dr. Mendoza	Max's doctor
Jonadyka Muriel	Rocío	Armando's secretary
Gerardo Aguilar	Pipas	
Del Rangel	Patas	
