= Eric Vonn =

Guatemalan telenovela writer (born 20th century)

- Occupation: Writer
- Years active: 1986-2025
- Notable work: Cicatrices del alma, Háblame de Amor, Cielo Rojo, Sed de venganza

Eric Vonn (born 20th century) is a Guatemalan telenovela writer, based in Mexico, known for his unique and "different" storylines.

== Career ==
A hallmark of his work is that the villains are not usually in love with the protagonist (a cliché motive for characters in the average telenovela and something for which they have been criticized) and that most of his telenovelas seem to center more on the villains and their stories instead of the "good guys". Furthermore, he has a reputation for creating memorable villains, such as Marcia and Don Chema in Tierra de Pasiones, Doña Ágata, Inés, and Elena in Pecados Ajenos, the demon in La Chacala, and Doña Loreto in Cielo Rojo.

Tierra de Pasiones and Pecados Ajenos, two of his novelas, could be considered modern-day retellings of William Shakespeare's Romeo and Juliet, especially the latter, and are of the tragicomedic genre. They were also known for their unusual and controversial series finales. Vonn's work, usually considered black comedy, is full of double entendres, puns, violent scenes, explicit sex scenes, and satirical and sarcastic takes on Christianity. For example, in Pecados Ajenos, the villain Ágata would always ask the Virgin Mary that her latest murder go as planned and that her victim would go to hell. She would often say "As a Christian woman, I..." before saying something really un-Christian. This kind of dark humor and graphic scenes have caused his telenovelas to be aired in later time slots.

Additionally, Vonn's novelas greatly differ from other Hispanic writers in that they typically take place in the United States and follow the lives of Hispanic-American characters facing contemporary issues, such as illegal immigration, LGBT acceptance among the conservative Hispanic community, difficulties getting into college, teenage drug abuse, sex, and subtle criticisms on religion.

=== Writing style ===
Vonn uses black humor in his latest telenovelas with Telemundo and TV Azteca. The dialogues are full of ironic, sarcastic phrases, full of allegories and cynicism; the mimics of the characters must be the same way. The situations – whether it is gore, murder, or violence – are full of black humor which causes viewers to have different emotions at the same time. His novelas normally feature much physical and verbal violence, full of nude erotic scenes specially featuring villains. They are very realistic and close-to-real-life characters with their actions.

Protagonists are not the "main characters" of the novela: They have almost the same percentage of the scenes as villains or estelars. The best proof of this type of work are his late-timeslot telenovelas Pecados Ajenos with Telemundo, Cielo Rojo and Vivir a Destiempo with Azteca. Tierra de Pasiones with Telemundo and Quererte Así with TV Azteca are a bit lighter, especially the ultimate one, because of earlier timeslot.

=== Filmography ===
==== Telenovelas ====
Television
Year	Title	Company	Duty
2024–25	Sed de venganza	Telemundo	Original Story, Adaptation and Screenplay, 92 episodes.
2023	Gloria Trevi: Ellas soy yo	TV Azteca	Original Story, Adaptation and Screenplay, 15 episodes.
2016	Un día cualquiera	TV Azteca	Original Story, Adaptation and Screenplay. 80 episodes
2015–16	A que no me dejas	Televisa	Original Story, Adaptation and Screenplay, his own remake of "Amor en silencio".
2013–14	Por siempre mi amor	Televisa	Original story, adaptation and screenplay, his own new remake of "Mi segunda madre".
2013–14	Hombre Tenías que Ser	TV Azteca	Adaptation and Screenplay from Episode 56 till the end 105(Free Version)
2013	Vivir a Destiempo	TV Azteca	Original Story, Adaptation and Screenplay, 150 episodes
2012	Quererte Así	TV Azteca	Original Story, Adaptation and Screenplay, 120 episodes
2011–12	Cielo Rojo	TV Azteca	Original Story, Adaptation and Screenplay, 170 episodes
2007–08	Pecados Ajenos	Telemundo	Original Story, Adaptation and Screenplay, 167 episodes
2006–07	Amores de Mercado	Telemundo	Second part of the telenovela from existing story
2005–06	Tierra de Pasiones	Telemundo	Original Story, Adaptation and Screenplay, 172 episodes
2004	Piel de Otoño	Televisa	Remake of "Cicatrices del Alma"
2002	Súbete A Mi Moto	TV Azteca	Last 120 episodes of half hour each of existing story
2000–01	El Amor No Es Como Lo Pintan	TV Azteca	Original Story, Adaptation and Screenplay
1999–2000	El Candidato	TV Azteca	Collaboration on 170 episodes of half hour each from 250 total
1998–99	Háblame de Amor	TV Azteca	Original Story, Adaptation and Screenplay, 125 episodes
1997–98	La Chacala	TV Azteca	Original Story, Adaptation and Screenplay
1997	Al Norte del Corazon	TV Azteca	Co-author, 195 episodes of half hour each of 270 total
1996–97	Tric Trac	TV Azteca	Original Story, Adaptation and 100 episodes of half hour each
1995–96	Acapulco, Cuerpo, y Alma	Televisa	Based on a Story of Maria Zarattini, original screenplay
1993–94	Valentina	Televisa	Free version of already existing story, last 80 episodes of half hour each
1990–91	Amor De Nadie	Televisa	Original Story, Adaptation and Screenplay
1990	Días Sin Luna	Televisa	Original Story, Adaptation and Screenplay
1989	Mi Segunda Madre	Televisa	Original Story inspired by novel of Abel Santacruz, Adaptation and Screenplay
1987–88	Amor En Silencio	Televisa	Original Story, Adaptation and Screenplay
1986	Cicatrices del Alma	Televisa	Co-author of Original Story, Adaptation and Screenplay
