= Secreto de confesión (1965 TV series) =

- Genre: Telenovela
- Created by: Marissa Garrido
- Country of origin: Mexico
- Original language: Spanish

Original release
- Network: Telesistema Mexicano
- Release: 1965

Secreto de confesión is a Mexican telenovela produced by Ernesto Alonso for Telesistema Mexicano in 1965.

== Cast ==
- Carmen Montejo
- Carmelita González
- Roberto Cañedo
- Bertha Moss
