= La Leona (Mexican TV series) =

Mexican telenovela

- Genre: Telenovela
- Created by: Marissa Garrido
- Directed by: Ernesto Alonso
- Starring: Amparo Rivelles; Ernesto Alonso
- Country of origin: Mexico
- Original language: Spanish

Production
- Executive producer: Ernesto Alonso

Original release
- Network: Telesistema Mexicano
- Release: 1961

La leona (English: The Lioness) is a Mexican telenovela produced by Televisa and broadcast by Telesistema Mexicano in 1961.

== Cast ==
- Amparo Rivelles as Alicia
- Ernesto Alonso
- Augusto Benedico
- Guillermo Murray
- Jacqueline Andere as María
- María Antonieta de las Nieves
- Prudencia Griffel
- Luis Bayardo
- Gerardo del Castillo
- Malena Doria
- Ada Carrasco
- Judy Ponte
- Arturo Benavides
- Eduardo MacGregor
