= Peor es Nada =

- Location within Chile
- Coordinates: 34°46′53″S 71°2′15″W
- Country: Chile
- Region: (O'Higgins Region) O'Higgins
- Province: (Colchagua Province) Colchagua
- Commune: Chimbarongo

Population
  - Total: 1,900
- Demonym: peoresnadinos (-as)
- Time zone: UTC−4 (CLT)
  - Summer (DST): UTC−3 (CLST)

Peor es Nada (lit. Worse is Nothing) is a rural area located in the commune of Chimbarongo, the Colchagua Province of the O'Higgins Region of Chile.

Peor es Nada is an eminently rural place, founded by Juan Andres San Martín Ortiz,mainly dependant on fruit production (pears and apples), mostly concentrated in the San Ignacio estate. However, the construction of Convento Viejo Reservoir, threatens this source of income, since it would flood agricultural areas of the San Ignacio farm, as well as two other locations in Chimbarongo: Convento Viejo and San Miguel.

== Etymology ==
Its name would be the result of a peculiar anecdote that occurred in the 19th century, in the context of an inheritance. A powerful landowner family in the region, headed by Agustín Sánchez and Juana Ibarra, owned the extensive original finca. After his death, his lands would have been distributed among his heir children. At the time of reading the will, his youngest daughter, Eulalia Sánchez Echegaray, born in 1928, learned that she would receive the area that this town occupies today and was visibly disappointed, because she had expected a major inheritance. She pronounced with resignation, the following phrase: "Peor es nada" ("Better than nothing"). The oral tradition among the locals repeated this foundational anecdote for years and it was finally crystallized as the official town name when the traffic and road authorities decided to put the curious name on road signs.

Due to its curious name, Peor es Nada has been the subject of international newspaper reports by the media. The road signs with the name of the town have also become an object of worship for tourists, being photographed on numerous occasions and published on sites such as Flickr or Facebook.
