= Ernesto Alonso =

Mexican film producer (1917–2007)

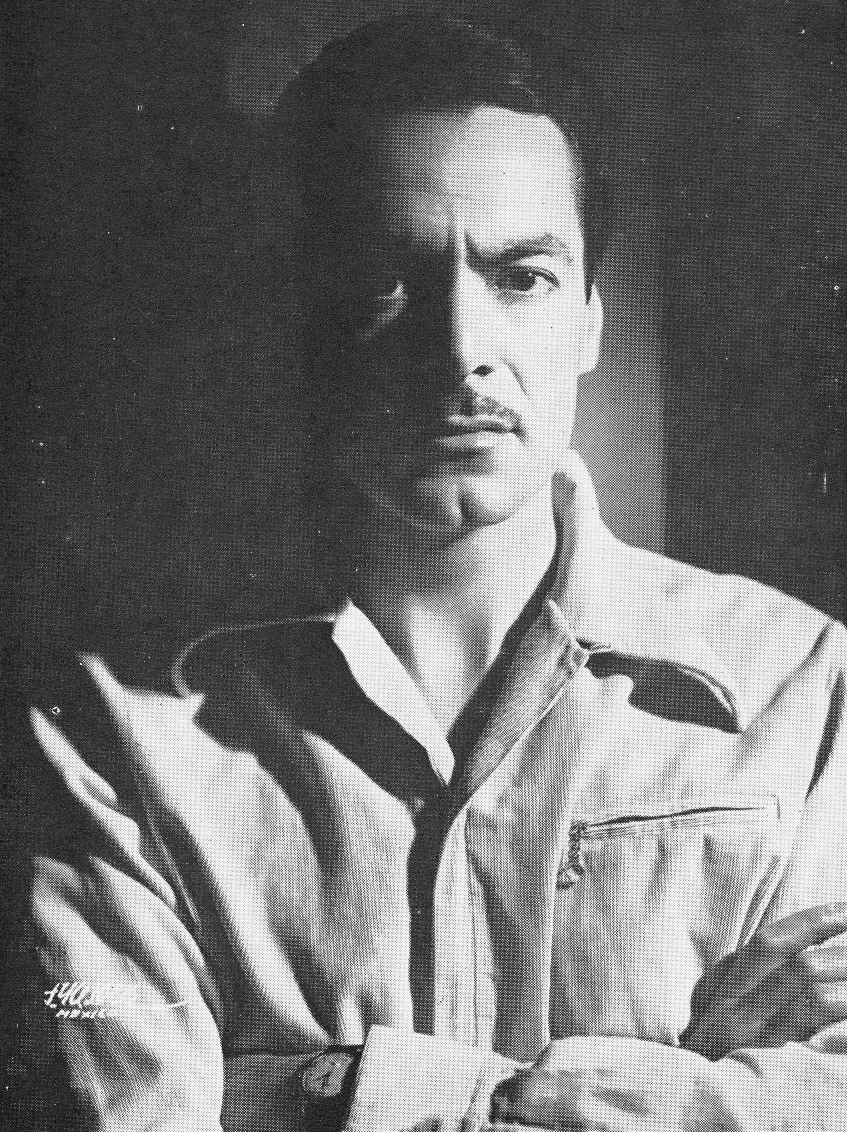
- Ernesto Alonso in 1954
- Born: Ernesto Ramírez Alonso; February 28, 1917; Aguascalientes, Mexico
- Died: August 7, 2007 (aged 90); Mexico City, Mexico
- Other name: El Señor Telenovela
- Occupations: Actor, producer, director, cinematographer
- Years active: 1937–2007

Ernesto Ramírez Alonso (February 28, 1917 – August 7, 2007) was a Mexican producer, director, cinematographer and actor. He was nicknamed "El Señor Telenovela" ("Mr. Soap Opera") because most of his work centered on telenovelas known around the world.

== Acting career ==
Ernesto began his career as an uncredited extra in La Zandunga (1938), a movie starring Lupe Vélez. He then appeared in 1939's "Papacito Lindo". His popularity grew as he starred in many films of the 1940s, including "La Gallina Culeca", "Historia de una gran Amor", "El Padre Morelas", "El Jorobado", "La Corte del Faraon", "Marina", "El Gallero", and "El Precio de la Gloria" in which he starred with his brother Alfonso Ramírez Alonso.

He made another series of films throughout the 1950s, including as the narrator of Los Olvidados (1950) and the lead in Ensayo de un crimen (1955), both directed by Luis Buñuel. However, it wasn't until the 1960s that Ernesto began appearing in telenovelas. His first was "Cartas de amor" (1960) which also starred another rising star Angélica María. Ernesto from there on only came out in telenovelas including "Leyendas de Mexico" opposite Jacqueline Andere, with whom he worked a lot in both films and telenovelas. Alonso's most memorable performance was as Enrique de Martino in the 1983 telenovela El maleficio in which he played a devil-like character. His last acting appearance was in the telenovela Entre el Amor y el Odio (2002) in which he played Father Abad. Ernesto only made one film between those years, 1986's El Maleficio II.

== Directing and producing career ==
Ernesto directing, produced and even starred in his own telenovelas sometimes. 1960's "Espejo de Sombras" was his first job as a director and he even produced it, but his first producing job was "Cuidado con el Angel" that very same year. Ernesto then made many memorable telenovelas including "La Leona", "La Cobarde", both of which he directed, produced and starred in. His last job as a director was the series "Cumbres Borrascosas" (1979) which was a telenovela version of an Emily Brontë novel. Ernesto then went to continue his career has a producer, producing twenty-five telenovelas throughout the 1980s, nine throughout the 1990s, and four in the 2000s. His last producing work being the telenovela "Barrera de Amor" which starred Yadhira Carrillo and Raquel Olmedo. Ernesto was awarded the Special Golden Ariel at the Ariel Awards in 2006 for his amazing career and contributions.

== Death ==
Ernesto Alonso died at the age of 90 at his home in Mexico City. Being kept in a hospital, sources say he knew he was passing, and that he wanted to spend his last moments in his home. In the end Ernesto Alonso acted in sixty-three films, directed forty-three films and telenovelas, but he would be most remembered for producing 158 telenovelas throughout his long career.

== Selected filmography ==
- The White Monk (1945)
- Tragic Wedding (1946)
- Everybody's Woman (1946)
- Philip of Jesus (1949)
