= List of Televisa telenovelas (1990s) =

The following is a list of telenovelas produced by Televisa in the 1990s.

== List ==
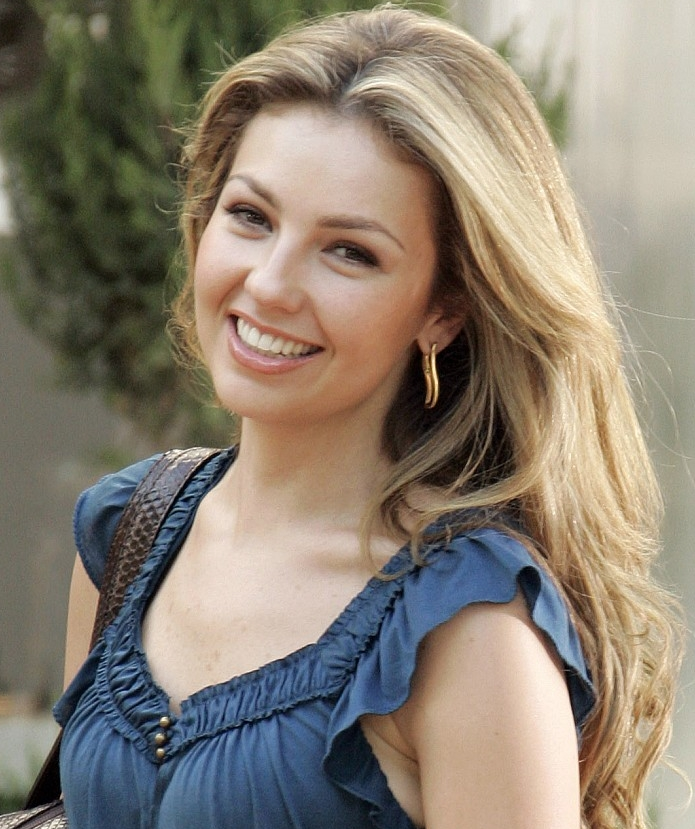
Thalía starred in telenovelas María la del Barrio, María Mercedes, Marimar and Rosalinda.

Title	Producer	Original Air date	Ref.
1990
Yo compro esa mujer	Ernesto Alonso	20 January – 7 September 1990	
Días sin luna	Juan Osorio	14 May – 31 August 1990	
Alcanzar una estrella	Luis de Llano Macedo	14 May – 21 December 1990	
Mi pequeña Soledad	Verónica Castro	14 May – 21 December 1990	
Destino	Carlos Sotomayor	21 May – 30 November 1990	
La fuerza del amor	Gonzalo Martínez Ortega	4 June 1990 – 4 January 1991	
Cenizas y diamantes	Eugenio Cobo	4 June 1990 – 18 January 1991	
Ángeles blancos	Carlos Sotomayor	3 September 1990 – 1 February 1991	
Amor de nadie	Carla Estrada	10 September 1990 – 14 June 1991	
En carne propia	Carlos Téllez	3 December 1990 – 16 August 1991	
1991
Cadenas de amargura	Carlos Sotomayor	1 January – 24 April 1991	
Alcanzar una estrella II	Luis de Llano Macedo	21 January – 7 June 1991	
Madres egoístas	Juan Osorio	4 February – 7 June 1991	
Milagro y magia	Florinda Meza	29 – 30 April August 1991	
Yo no creo en los hombres	Lucy Orozco	10 June – 30 September 1991	
Al filo de la muerte	Emilio Larrosa	17 June 1991 – 21 February 1992	
Muchachitas	Emilio Larrosa	24 June 1991 – 27 March 1992	
Atrapada	Ernesto Alonso	19 August 1991 – 24 April 1992	
La pícara soñadora	Valentín Pimstein	2 September – 20 December 1991	
Vida robada	Carlos Sotomayor	2 October 1991 – 17 January 1992	
Valeria y Maximiliano	Carlos Sotomayor	26 December 1991 – 1 May 1992	
1992
El abuelo y yo	Pedro Damián	6 January – 26 June 1992	
La sonrisa del Diablo	Ernesto Alonso	24 February – 31 July 1992	
Baila conmigo	Luis de Llano Macedo	30 March – 14 August 1992	
Carrusel de las Américas	Valentín Pimstein	20 April 1992 – 12 October 1992	
De frente al sol	Carla Estrada	4 May – 11 September 1992	
Ángeles sin paraíso	Pedro Damián	29 June 1992 – 29 January 1993	
Triángulo	Ernesto Alonso	3 August – 20 November 1992	
Las secretas intenciones	Lucy Orozco	17 August – 27 November 1992	
María Mercedes	Valentín Pimstein	14 September 1992 – 5 January 1993	
Tenías que ser tú	Carlos Téllez	23 November 1992 – 12 March 1993	
Mágica juventud	Emilio Larrosa	30 November 1992 – 30 April 1993	
1993
Capricho	Carlos Sotomayor	11 January – 18 June 1993	
Entre la vida y la muerte	Angelli Nesma Medina	11 January – 2 July 1993	
La última esperanza	Eugenio Cobo	1 February – 14 May 1993	
Clarisa	Juan Osorio	15 March – 11 June 1993	
Los parientes pobres	Carla Estrada	3 May – 13 August 1993	
Sueño de amor	José Rendón	17 May – 20 August 1993	
Valentina	José Alberto Castro	21 June 1993 – 28 January 1994	
Corazón salvaje	José Rendón	5 July 1993 – 18 February 1994	
Dos mujeres, un camino	Emilio Larrosa	16 August 1993 – 1 July 1994	
Buscando el paraíso	Luis de Llano Macedo	8 November 1993 – 1 April 1994	
Más allá del puente	Carla Estrada	8 November 1993 – 25 March 1994	
1994
Marimar	Verónica Pimstein	31 January – 26 August 1994	
Prisionera de amor	Pedro Damián	28 March – 22 July 1994	
Agujetas de color de rosa	Luis de Llano Macedo	4 April 1994 – 26 May 1995	
El vuelo del águila	Ernesto Alonso	4 July 1994 – 20 January 1995	
Volver a empezar	Emilio Larrosa	25 July 1994 – 10 February 1995	
Imperio de cristal	Carlos Sotomayor	29 August 1994 – 17 February 1995	
Caminos cruzados	Herval Rossano	5 December 1994 – 12 April 1995	
1995
Alondra	Carla Estrada	23 January – 1 September 1995	
María José	Juan Osorio	13 February – 18 May 1995	
Si Dios me quita la vida	Pedro Damián	20 February – 11 August 1995	
Bajo un mismo rostro	Christian Bach	17 April – 25 August 1995	
La dueña	Florinda Meza	22 May – 29 September 1995	
La paloma	José Rendón	14 August – 20 October 1995	
María la del Barrio	Angelli Nesma Medina	14 August 1995 – 26 April 1996	
El premio mayor	Emilio Larrosa	4 September 1995 – 24 May 1996	
Acapulco, cuerpo y alma	José Alberto Castro	4 September 1995 – 12 April 1996	
Morelia	Carlos Sotomayor	29 May 1995 – 19 April 1996	
Pobre niña rica	Enrique Segoviano	2 October 1995 – 5 January 1996	
Lazos de Amor	Carla Estrada	2 October 1995 – 23 February 1996	
Retrato de familia	Lucy Orozco	23 October 1995 – 19 January 1996	
1996
Azul	Pinkye Morris	8 January – 22 March 1996	
Marisol	Juan Osorio	22 January – 9 August 1996	
Morir dos veces	José Rendón	26 February – 10 May 1996	
Confidente de secundaria	Luis de Llano Macedo	25 March – 27 September 1996	
Para toda la vida	Lucero Suárez	15 April – 2 August 1996	
Cañaveral de pasiones	Humberto Zurita	22 April – 6 September 1996	
La antorcha encendida	Ernesto Alonso	6 May – 15 November 1996	
Canción de amor	Luis de Llano Macedo	13 May – 13 September 1996	
La sombra del otro	Julissa	27 May – 16 August 1996	
Bendita mentira	Jorge Lozano Soriano	5 August – 6 December 1996	
La culpa	Yuri Breña	12 August – 11 October 1996	
Sentimientos ajenos	José Alberto Castro	19 August 1996 – 3 January 1997	
Tú y yo	Emilio Larrosa	2 September 1996 – 21 March 1997	
Luz Clarita	Mapat L. de Zatarain	30 September 1996 – 21 February 1997	
Te sigo amando	Carla Estrada	18 November 1996 – 25 April 1997	
Mi querida Isabel	Angelli Nesma Medina	9 December 1996 – 25 April 1997	
1997
Alguna vez tendremos alas	Florinda Meza	6 January – 28 November 1997	
Pueblo chico, infierno grande	José Alberto Castro	6 January – 1 August 1997	
Los hijos de nadie	Mapat L. de Zatarain	24 February – 20 June 1997	
No tengo madre	Carlos Sotomayor	10 March – 2 May 1997	
Gente bien	Lucy Orozco	28 April – 15 August 1997	
La jaula de oro	José Rendón	28 April – 1 August 1997	
Esmeralda	Salvador Mejía	5 May – 28 November 1997	
El alma no tiene color	Juan Osorio	23 June – 7 November 1997	
María Isabel	Carla Estrada	4 August 1997 – 6 February 1998	
Salud, dinero y amor	Emilio Larrosa	4 August 1997 – 2 January 1998	
Amada enemiga	Carlos Sotomayor	18 August – 5 December 1997	
Huracán	Alejandro Camacho	13 October 1997 – 27 March 1998	
Desencuentro	Ernesto Alonso	17 November 1997 – 3 April 1998	
El secreto de Alejandra	Jorge Lozano Soriano	1 December 1997 – 2 January 1998	
Sin ti	Angelli Nesma Medina	8 December 1997 – 10 April 1998	
Mi pequeña traviesa	Pedro Damián	8 December 1997 – 24 April 1998	
1998
La Usurpadora	Salvador Mejía Alejandre	9 February – 24 July 1998	
Una luz en el camino	Mapat de Zatarain	30 March – 31 July 1998	
Vivo Por Elena	Juan Osorio	6 April – 11 September 1998	
Rencor apasionado	Marcia del Rio	20 April – 10 July 1998	
Preciosa	Pedro Damián	27 April – 28 August 1998	
La Mentira	Carlos Sotomayor	13 July – 27 November 1998	
El Privilegio de Amar	Carla Estrada	27 July 1998 – 26 February 1999	
Gotita de amor	Nicandro Díaz González	3 August – 20 November 1998	
Soñadoras	Emilio Larrosa	31 August 1998 – 30 April 1999	
Camila	Angelli Nesma Medina	14 September 1998 – 15 January 1999	
El diario de Daniela	Rosy Ocampo	30 November 1998 – 16 April 1999	
Ángela	José Alberto Castro	30 November 1998 – 19 March 1999	
1999
Nunca te olvidaré	Caridad Bravo Adams	18 January – 28 May 1999	
Rosalinda	Salvador Mejía Alejandre	1 March – 18 June 1999	
Tres mujeres	Martha Carrillo	22 March 1999 – 14 April 2000	
El niño que vino del mar	Olga Ruilopez	19 April – 27 August 1999	
Amor gitano	María Eugenia Cervantes	3 May – 16 July 1999	
Por tu amor	Caridad Bravo Adams	31 May – 1 October 1999	
Infierno en el paraíso	Nora Alemán	21 June – 22 October 1999	
Alma rebelde	Hilda Morales de Allous	19 July – 19 November 1999	
Serafín	Salvador Sánchez	30 August – 17 December 1999	
Laberintos de pasión	Caridad Bravo Adams	4 October 1999 – 21 January 2000	
Mujeres engañadas	Emilio Larrosa	25 October 1999 – 7 April 2000	
DKDA: Sueños de juventud	Carmen Sepúlveda	22 November 1999 – 28 April 2000	
Cuento de Navidad	Eugenio Cobo	20 December 1999 – 7 January 2000	
