= Alejandra Ávalos =

Mexican musician and actress (born 1968)

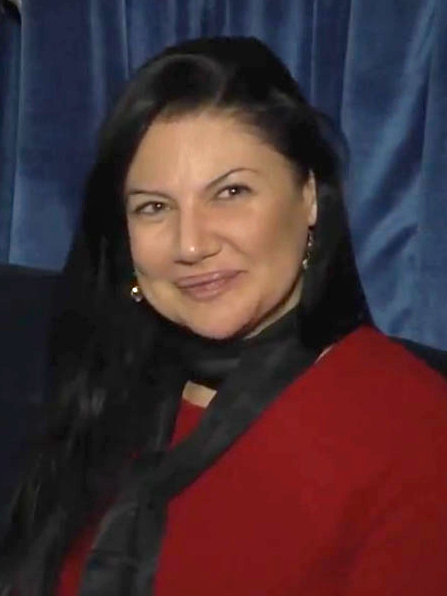
- Ávalos in 2018
- Born: Alejandra Margarita Ávalos Rodríguez; October 17, 1968 (age 58); Mexico City, Mexico
- Education: Universidad IberoAmericana
- Occupations: Singer; musician; actress; television host
- Years active: 1980–present
- Spouses: Fernando Ciangherotti (m. 1988–1991) Giovanni Benaglio (m. 1995–1998)
- Children: Valentina Benaglio
- Musical career
- Instruments: Vocals, piano, guitar
- Labels: Warner Bros.; Epic; Sony; Orfeón; Mixdown; Columbia

Alejandra Margarita Ávalos Rodríguez (born October 17, 1968) is a Mexican singer, musician and actress. She began her career in 1980, when she took part in the musical contest La Voz del Heraldo. After receiving a scholarship to study in a two-year training program, she began working as a model; afterwards, she began appearing on television as a supporting actress in 1983; by that time she also provided backing vocals for some recording artists. Since 1984, Ávalos obtained a number of leading roles on stage, including the theatrical productions The Rocky Horror Show and Jesus Christ Superstar. At the time, she began working as a TV host on Televisa. Avalos's breakthrough came in 1986 with her first leading role on television in the successful series El padre Gallo, media referred to Ávalos as "The New Young Super-Star".

In 1987, Ávalos signed to Warner Music Group, afterwards, she released her debut album Ser o No Ser (1988), it was followed by the successful albums Amor Fasciname (1990) and Amor Sin Dueño (1991); a number of singles were taken from such albums, including "Contigo o Sin Tí, "Aparentemente", "Tu Hombre Yo Niña", "Amor Fasciname", "Casualidad" and "Como Puedes Saber"; she also recorded the duet "Te Quiero Así" with José José. Her music also incorporates elements of Mariachi (Mi Corazón Se Regala, 1996), Bolero-pop (Una Mujer, 1999), Big Band (Radio Diva, 2005) and electronic dance music (Te Sigo Queriendo, 2016) among others.

Ávalos portrayed the leading role in the 1995 drama film Perdóname Todo; she also obtained a number of leading roles on television including the teenage drama series Tenías que ser tú (1992) and Soñadoras (1998); on the other hand, Ávalos also starred as the main antagonist in several dramas including Tal como somos (1987), Tiempo de amar (1987), the police procedural Morir dos veces (1996), Siempre te amaré (2000) and Apuesta por un amor (2004).

Ávalos has taken part in several singing competitions, besides becoming a finalist at the Mexican national selection for the OTI Festival during the 1980s and 1990s, and later at the Viña del Mar International Song Festival in the 2000s.

In 2018, for the first time in over 30 years, Ávalos starred in a big budget musical, playing Doña Mariquita in the 4D stage production Capricho-LivExperience, an adaptation of Miguel Barnet's multi-awarded coming-of-age novel Canción de Rachel; furthermore, the artist released her eighth studio album México Majestuoso Vol.I on the same day as its counterpart México Majestuoso Vol. II; the digital version was released on October 31, as a double album; produced and co-written by Ávalos, it became the first double release in her career, an homage to the greatest singer-songwriters through Mexico's folk music history.

On December 18, 2022, Ávalos, competed and eventually, she became one of the winners during the Final competition of the reality cooking show MasterChef Celebrity México, accompanied by her daughter, the Italian entrepreneur and fashion model Valentina Benaglio.

== Early life ==
Ávalos was born on October 17, 1968, in Mexico City as the eldest child of Carlos Mario Ávalos y Solano and Ninfa Margarita Rodríguez, a model during the 1960s. Ávalos had a Catholic upbringing. She has an older brother – José Alberto Ávalos. Her father was an architect, government official and writer, who died in 2016 at the age of 84. Ávalos attended Universidad IberoAmericana, where she studied for a bachelor's degree in communications. On July 19, 1996, Ávalos gave birth to her first daughter, taking a one-year hiatus to take care of her child. Her daughter, the Italian-Mexican model Valentina Benaglio, earned a bachelor's degree in communications at Universidad IberoAmericana; Benaglio was a brand strategist, writer and redactor in several fashion magazines in Mexico city; then, she moved to New York City, where she became an entrepreneur, data scientist, brand creator and corporate manager.

"My Daughter´s first cry is something I will remember my whole life..for the time being, we want to devote ourselves entirely to Valentina'"

— Ávalos, on her daughter

== Career ==
=== 1979–1983: Early work ===
During the late 1970s and early 1980s, Ávalos was involved in a number of competitions, but it was not until 1980 when she took part in a major event, La Voz del Heraldo, one of the most important musical contests in Mexico; although she was not officially registered, Ávalos took part in the competition, singing songs by Juan Carlos Calderón, but she was disqualified; nevertheless, she was given a scholarship to study for two years at Centro de Capacitación de los Iniciadores de la Televisión Mexicana. Since her professional debut at La Voz del Heraldo, Ávalos has been performing within a wide vocal range; she has been classified as a mezzosoprano. In 1983, Ávalos obtained an offer by The Coca-Cola Company´s Sidral Mundet to appear as a model in a TV commercial; later, Ávalos had her first acting work, she appeared uncredited as a nurse in the 1983 drama "Amalia Batista". At the time, Ávalos took part in the contest "Festival de la canción de la Ibero", she won first place unanimously; then she was given another scholarship among 4000 aspirants to study at Centro de Capacitación Mexicana (Televisa); her acting coach Sergio Jiménez, referred to Ávalos as "The most energetic and outstanding student".

=== 1984–1988: Mainstream success, theater, and debut album ===
==== Breakthrough ====
After some modeling work, Ávalos began appearing in several stage productions in 1984; first, portraying supporting roles and providing backing vocals in plays such as El Títere-Pinocchio by Chespirito or Fausto Musical, subsequently she portrayed the leading role of Mary Magdalene on Jesus Christ Superstar, initially, she was the replacement; Ávalos also provided lead and backing vocals on stage and the official LP. In 1985, Ávalos continued her work on stage, and became the TV host on El Mundo de VideoCentro, a documentary series about the history of the international film industry; on the other hand, Ávalos recorded what was supposed to be her debut studio album alongside the successful production team Kiko Campos -Fernando Riba; the release of her new wave/Italian rock-oriented album was cancelled. Meanwhile, Ávalos was hired by several teenage groups as a backing vocalist.

In 1986, Ávalos was hired to portray the leading role of Janet Weiss in the successful stage production The Rocky Horror Show. She also obtained the leading role on "Robin Hood". Soon after, Ávalos provided backing and lead vocals for the 1986 FIFA World Cup official album Bienvenidos – Viva México '86 by Spanish tenor Plácido Domingo.

Later, in that year, Televisa's CEO Emilio Azcárraga Milmo hired Ávalos to play her first leading role on TV, in the highly rated soap-opera "El padre Gallo", she portrayed both female and male characters. At the time, media referred to Ávalos as "The New Young Super-Star. In 1987, Ávalos made a number of notable appearances on TV, she portrayed the main antagonist in two drama series, "Tal como somos" co-starring Enrique Álvarez Félix; and "Tiempo de amar" by Silvia Pinal, co-starring Fernando Allende; on the other hand, Ávalos obtained the leading role of La Malinche on the stage production "Malinche Opera – Una epopeya musical" about the fall of the Aztec Empire.

==== Ser o No Ser ====
After several years of modeling, acting work and studio recordings, Ávalos met Hispavox CEO Honorio Herrero in Spain in 1987, who previously worked for Luis Miguel´s breakout recording Palabra de Honor; afterwards, Ávalos signed to Warner Music Group after a meeting in Spain between Herrero and the WEA executive chairman René León. At the time, Ávalos made her first appearance as a soloist for an international broadcasting on "Siempre en Domingo", performing a ten-minute Broadway-medley that included "West Side Story", "The Rocky Horror Show", "Jesus Christ Superstar" and "Zoot Suit", host Raúl Velasco said "..you have to take your hat off to Ávalos".

The recording of "Ser o No Ser" began in 1987 produced by Honorio Herrero; all the instrumental tracks and some vocals were recorded in London; additional vocals and arrangements were recorded in Miami, Florida. In 1988, Ávalos released her debut solo LP "Ser o No Ser", available in two different versions. The album spawned a number of hit singles including, "Ser O No Ser", a new wave track which became the debut solo single in Ávalos´ career, the power rock ballad "Punto final", "Tren Tren Tren", "Corazón al Viento" and "Numero 1"; nevertheless, the best selling single was "Tu hombre, Yo Niña", which brought Ávalos wide recognition; a promotional video was made for the song for Siempre en Domingo. By the time, Eurovision winner Juan Carlos Calderón, who was working with Herb Alpert, reached a contractual agreement with Ávalos in 1989.

By the time, she took part for the first time in the 18th Mexican national selection for the OTI Festival; she entered with the song "Simple y Llanamente" written for her by Pedro Alberto Cárdenas. Her participation in the event brought international attention.

=== 1989–1994: Height of fame, and departure from Warner Bros. ===
==== Amor Fasciname and Festival OTI Nacional ====
In the fall of 1989, Ávalos finished recording the album "Amor Fasciname" in Madrid, Spain; at the same time, Ávalos released the promotional recording "Cielo Rojo (live)", a folk-huapango song, which required the use of the falsetto technique. Later in December, Ávalos released the first promo from the upcoming album, the title track "Amor Fasciname", soon after, in January 1990, both the physical single and the album were officially released; at the time, "Amor Fasciname" became the best-selling single by the artist; the album provided a number of successful songs, including the electronic rock/new wave track "Lo Que Pasó Pasó", and "Contigo o Sin Tí", a power ballad for which, she filmed her first official music video. Other notable singles are "Casualidad", "Tres Veces No", "Amame" "Nada Nuevo Bajo El Sol" and "Dos Veces", the latter was originally written and recorded by Ávalos in 1982. By the time, Ávalos released the successful new wave single "Ámame Hoy". Simultaneously, she released a Spanish version of the song "We'll Be Together", originally by British musician Sting. In October, she made her second consecutive appearance at the 19th Mexican national selection for the OTI Festival; unlike the previous year, she became one of the finalists with the song "Viernes primero", written for her once again by Pedro Alberto Cárdenas; 24 years later, she released alongside other Festival OTI Nacional finalists a compilation album, and they went on tour.

In 1991, screenwriter Laura Esquivel offered Ávalos the leading role of "Tita" in the Golden Globe nominee film Like Water for Chocolate "(Como Agua Para Chocolate)", she was the original choice, but she turned down the offer. Soon after, Ávalos starred in the romance-thriller "Amor y Venganza", she also recorded the soundtrack.

==== Como Puedes Saber and Show de Gala Internacional ====
After being named "The Show-Woman of México" by media, Ávalos released her third album under WEA, "Amor Sin Dueño", produced by Calderón in collaboration with John Robinson and Paul Jackson Jr.; recorded at Sunset Sound Recorders Studios, Hollywood, CA. and Madrid Spain, it became her last studio recording under Warner Brothers; the album spawned several hit singles, including "No No No", "Obligame" (ft vocals by K. C. Porter), "Amor Sin Dueño" and "Volverás y Volveré"; nevertheless, the most successful songs were the lead single "Aparentemente", and the signature single "Como Puedes Saber", During the second half of 1991, Ávalos embarked on the "Amor Sin Dueño" Tour, which included night club and massive live performances; it lasted until mid-1995, and reached its peak in 1993, when Ávalos created the project "Show de Gala Internacional", that included several multiple changes of stage and costumes, and multiple music genres such as rock, electronica, Big band, bolero, mariachi, funk, latin ballad and Rhythm and blues. In December, Ávalos released the single "Tu-Ru-Ra", featuring vocals by Fher, from Maná. On February 18, 1992, Warner music released "Amor Sin Dueño" in the United States.

In 1987, Ávalos was banned from acting for five years, due to a legal dispute between Warner Bros. and Televisa; it was triggered after the contractual agreement between her and the record label; the conflict also affected other recording artists and all the film and television agreements in IberoAmerica. Subsequently, Ávalos resigned from Warner Bros; therefore, in 1992, she was offered the leading role for the highly rated teenage series "Tenías que ser tú", she also recorded the soundtrack in collaboration with composer/orchestra conductor Pedro Plascencia Salinas, including the six-minute suite "Tenías Que Ser Tú" ("It Had to Be You"). In late 1992, Ávalos released the soft-rock ballad "Para Que Engañarnos", it became her last collaboration with Spanish composer Juan Carlos Calderón.

In early 1993, Ávalos toured LatinAmerica with "Tenías Que Ser Tú 93", that included a number of consecutive shows at the defunct Cabaret "El Patio". subsequently, she released "Perdonar", her first single released after her departure from Warner Bros. In 1994, it was scheduled a techno-house music album under Warner Bros., it was cancelled.

=== 1995–1999: Move to Epic, folk music and acting success ===
==== Perdóname Todo and La Reina del Mariachi ====
In 1995, Ávalos signed a recording contract with Epic Records, all the previous demos for her unreleased fourth album with Warner Bros. were discarded; afterwards, at the request of her new record label, she began recording songs in other different genres, including Bolero, ranchero and mariachi. In March 1995, the premiere of the highly anticipated drama film "Perdóname Todo" is carried out, Ávalos portrayed an emerging talent, victim of emotional and physical abuse by her alcoholic husband, a decadent musician, portrayed by iconic singer José José; at the same time, both José and Ávalos released the successful ballad "Te Quiero Así", the main theme from the film; the song had its premiere during the 1995 "El Heraldo de México" awards. It became the last acting work for both Jose and co-star Claudio Brook.

In September 1995, Ávalos released the successful Bolero single "Para Olvidarme De Tí" distributed by Universal Music and Melody; right before moving to Epic Records and Sony Music, in the same month, she made her last live performance as a pop-rock act on Siempre en Domingo, Ávalos sang both "Para Olvidarme de Tí" and "Como Puedes Saber", one of her best-selling singles, released in 1991.

Subsequently, Ávalos officially began her career as a Mariachi performer during the "II Encuentro Internacional del Mariachi" held in Guadalajara, Mexico; she was named by the media "La Madrina y Reina del Mariachi de México" in 1995 and 1996. In late 1995, Ávalos officially closed a recording deal with Epic Records, subsequently, she finished recording "Mi Corazón se Regala", her first Mariachi studio album, It was released in IberoAmerica in 1996, and in the United States in February 1997. The album spawned a number of successful songs, including "Mi Corazón se Regala" (lead single accompanied by a music video), "Pena Negra" and "Si Tu Cuerpo", all of them released in 1996; later, it was released "Ayer Hablé Con Mi Orgullo" (lead single in the United States accompanied by a music video).

==== Television success ====
In 1996, Ávalos obtained one of the leading roles in the police television drama "Morir dos veces", co-starring Eduardo Palomo; Ávalos portrayed the main antagonist, a female federal police officer. At the time, Ávalos portrayed one of the main antagonists in the highly rated TV series "La Antorcha Encendida"; an historical drama which described the events during the independence of Mexico from the Spanish Empire. Soon after, Ávalos released a Spanish version of the 1946 Disney song "Song of the South" called "Siembra Dulzura"; all the royalties were donated to the Rarámuri-Tarahumara people.

To support her first Mariachi studio album, both, Ávalos and singer Vicente Fernández (commonly known as "The King of Ranchera Music") went on tour during 1995 and 1996. At the time, Ávalos released under Sony the folk song "Ojitos Traidores" which combines elements of cante gitano and Mariachi, an homage to Javier Solís. Later on, Ávalos decided to retire for a while to take care of her newborn Valentina Benaglio. In 1997, Ávalos is hired to become the official image for Televisa Monterrey. In 1998, Ávalos released under Melody Records the single "Una Madre Como Tú".

In 1998, after a year hiatus, Ávalos returned to TV, portraying the leading role in the highly rated teenage soap-opera "Soñadoras"; the drama brought Ávalos renewed fame and success. In 1999, Ávalos portrayed the leading role in the drama film "Maldito Amor-Demasiado Tarde". The film was distributed by Univision Networks and Warner Bros. Pictures only in the United States.

In November 1999, Ávalos released "Danza del Milenio", a power pop/cumbia song, recorded in collaboration with Televisa and Pernod Ricard; it was accompanied by an expensive music video to promote Brandy Presidente by Casa Pedro Domecq. By the time, Ávalos obtained her seventh leading role on stage, she portrayed "Doña Ines de Ulloa" in the religious-fantasy drama "Don Juan Tenorio" performed at Diego Rivera theater.

=== 2000–present: Big band, electronic music and upcoming projects ===
==== Professional struggles and Radio Diva ====
By the new millennium, Ávalos saw renewed success by her main villain role in the successful drama series "Siempre te amaré", she portrayed a serial killer who suffered from multiple personality disorder. In July 2001, the Quintana Roo state government hired Ávalos to write and recording a theme called "Mi Quintana Roo", to promote tourism in Cancun, and archaeological site Tulum; it was accompanied by a promotional video. In late 2000, Ávalos once again portrayed the leading role of "Doña Inés" on stage for the musical comedy version of "Don Juan Tenorio".

In 2001, Ávalos launched an art exhibition in collaboration with American artist Nadine Markova called "Sexaciones", it was released in order to spread social and environmental awareness, and addressed multiple topics including sexual harassment, menstruation and international political conflicts. The inauguration was held at Plaza de la Ciudadela, Historic center of Mexico City and in the multi-cultural neighborhood Polanco, Mexico City, it was attended by many personalities from the political and cultural environment including painter/sculptor José Luis Cuevas. The royalties from the exhibition were donated to HIV/AIDS and Breast cancer foundations.

In 2002, Ávalos finished recording 20 tracks, all of them written and produced by the artist herself, for an upcoming pop-rock/electronica album called "Evolución"; the songs were recorded in English, Spanish and Italian language versions. In 2003, Ávalos resigned from her record label Sony Music, therefore, the expected follow-up album "Evolución" was scrapped. In 2004, after a brief hiatus, having spent time facing problems in her personal and professional life, Ávalos portrayed the main antagonist in the successful romance-drama "Apuesta por un amor".

By the time, Ávalos signed to Orfeón, a record label focused on classical and rock and roll music; afterwards in 2005, she released her first full-length Big band album, "Radio Diva" recorded in Mexico City and New York; she became one of the first IberoAmerican mainstream acts to dabble in such genre; the album which also contained elemements of jazz, blues, rock music and Electronic dance music features a range of standards from various eras, including "Enamorada" by Consuelo Velázquez, "Green Eyes" – "(Aquellos Ojos Verdes)", "Quizás, Quizás, Quizás" among other classical pieces. The album had its premiere on VIP Big Brother LatinAmerica and broadcast on SKY; at the time, Ávalos was a contestant on Big Brother VIP IV.

==== Viña del Mar Music Festival, and Electronic dance music ====
In February 2006, Ávalos was invited to perform at Viña del Mar International Song Festival, Chile; her performance was not only for entertainment purposes, she entered directly into the "International Competition", in which, she was the headliner during the second and final stage; subsequently, Ávalos became one of the finalists with the power-ballad "Arder"; the event was broadcast via television to many Latin American countries, expanding Avalos' fame throughout the continent. Shortly afterwards, Ávalos returned to the stage; she took the leading role in the satirical comedy "Una Mujer Compartida". In 2007, Ávalos finished recording her upcoming pop-rock/Electronica album "Te Sigo Queriendo", all the tracks were written by the artist herself. The official release was delayed for seven years. By 2008, Ávalos began filming the romantic comedy "Un Tigre en la Cama", she was hired to portray the female leading role; the film had its official premiere in February 2009.

On September 15, 2009, Ávalos gave a concert in front of an audience of over 80 000 people at Zócalo (Mexico City Main Square), during the Independence Day celebration, hosted by Mexican President Felipe Calderón. In early 2010, Ávalos became part of the supergroup "Ellas Las Divas" alongside jazz singer Lila Deneken, they signed to "Continental" and released the studio album "Como Dos Tragos de Tequila" on August 1, 2010.

Shortly afterwards, Ávalos returned to her solo career; she performed live at several events during 2010, including the 2010 NASCAR Corona Series (the first Night Shift auto racing in Mexico and LatinAmerica); she opened the Pennzoil 240 racing competition with her performance of the Mexican National Anthem. Meanwhile, she appeared in the comedy series "Humor a Quien Humor Merece". In 2011, Ávalos appeared in the romance/drama series "Esperanza del corazón", at the request of producer Luis de Llano Macedo, she re-recorded a norteña version of her 2007 pop/rock track "Te Sigo Queriendo"; which became the main theme from the series.

On September 3, 2012, Columbia Records released the pop rock/bolero/latin dance album "Una Mujer", written by Colombian composer Kike Santander, it was originally scheduled for a worldwide release under Sony Music in 1998, but it was cancelled at the last minute by the new executive vice-president of A&R at Sony. By the time, Ávalos guest-starred in the horror/anthology Tv series "Historias Delirantes", broadcast only in the United States.

In 2013, Ávalos was hired to portray the leading role as a medical assistant in the thematic series Nueva vida alongside Héctor Suárez Gomís; supported by a large cast, the show was created to address multiple female health issues, including pregnancy and maternity. In late 2013, Ávalos joined other former Festival OTI Nacional winners, including Manoella Torres, to begin an extensive tour across LatinAmerica and the U.S.

In 2014, Ávalos portrayed the leading role and provided lead vocals during the premiere of the stage play "Amar y Querer", it became her first collaboration with José José since 1995. In the summer of that year, after seven years of having been recorded, Ávalos released the pop-rock/emo-inspired album "Te Sigo Queriendo"; all the tracks were written, composed and produced by the artist herself. The album was first released in 2014 in some online music stores, later, it was released on iTunes and Apple Music on July 6, 2015; it is scheduled a tour to support the album; Ávalos will play the piano and guitar live, accompanied by a backup band

In early 2015, Ávalos embarked on a solo tour; later on, she starred as antagonist in some Tv series. Ávalos returned to the stage in September of the same year; she created a large-scale musical show called "México Lindo Y Querido"; Ávalos took the leading role and was accompanied by a number of comedians, musicians, actors, extras and dancers, supported by the "Villas de Chalco girls' choir" (homeless children foundation); the show also included multiple stages, outfit changes, mariachi, impersonations and a Dance of the Flyers performance by "Los Voladores de Papantla"; the stage production had its premiere in Mexico City; subsequently, Ávalos went on tour with "México Lindo Y Querido". On September 5, 2016, Ávalos became one of the main acts during the first posthumous homage to singer-songwriter Juan Gabriel held at "Palacio de Bellas Artes", both met in the mid-1990s, when Gabriel gave Ávalos a song for her first Mariachi album "Mi Corazón Se Regala";

On October 17, 2016, Ávalos released worldwide "Te Sigo Queriendo (Remixes)", the first mix album of a series of EDM releases. On June 24, 2017, Ávalos performed at the 39th LGBTTTI Rights Movement march & concert, held at Zócalo (Mexico City main square). On June 18, 2017, she released "De Fuego A Hielo", the second mix album from the "Remixes" series; it contained 11 tracks, the original soft-rock version plus 10 Electronica versions. On August 7, 2017, Ávalos received the Lifetime Achievement award by the National Association of Actors (A.N.D.A). In 2018, Ávalos is named Embajadora Internacional del Mariachi de México (International Ambassador of Mariachi de México). The actress will also star in the horror films Vacaciones del Terror and El Nahual; she also will be appearing in the sports drama film El Boxeador.

==== Musical productions in 4D, cinema streaming & Evolution ====
Ávalos received the Lifetime Achievement Award during the 4th annual FAMA-LATINOS Awards ceremony held on February 24, 2018, at Queens Theatre in the Park, New York City, for four decades of acting and musical career; the singer/songwriter dedicated the award to her daughter, the painter/writer Valentina Benaglio.

Written and composed by Ávalos, "Angeles Sin Alas" will be the lead single from her upcoming ninth studio album titled Evolución (Evolution), an experimental project, scheduled for release in late 2019, which will venture into a large number of genres including New-age music, ambient, techno and Avant Garde. The first demo recordings of Evolución were written between 1997 and 1999.

== Other activities ==
=== Business endeavours ===
Having signed a deal with Avon Products, Ávalos became the new model of the 1986 cosmetic ad campaign. In 1989, Ávalos signed a contract with Bacardi Limited to be the face of its official media ad campaign from 1990 to 1993, supported by other actors including Eugenio Derbez. In 2002, Ávalos launched a line of beauty-related products and cosmetics derived from natural sources.

=== Humanitarian and charity work ===
Avalos' humanitarian efforts have revolved around AIDS, cancer, poverty, animal rights, little children with disabilities and construction-renovation of public buildings, among other causes.

== Acting ==
=== Film, television, series ===
Year	Title	Role	Notes
1983	Amalia Batista	Uncredited	Cameo
1983–84	Que Lío con este Trío		Recurring role
1984	Guadalupe	Uncredited	Special appearance
1984	Principessa	Uncredited	Special appearance
1984	Te amo	Cecilia	Supporting role
1984–85	Cachún cachún ra ra!		Guest starring role
1984–85	Fans	Herself	Leading role, founding member of teen group Flans
1985	Abandonada	Alicia	Supporting role
1986	Martín Garatuza		Special appearance
1986	Nosotros los Gómez		TV series
1986–87	El padre Gallo	Ray	Leading role
1987	Tiempo de amar	Marcelita	Main antagonist
1987–88	Tal como somos	Delia	Main antagonist
1988	Estrellas de los 80's	Herself	Guest starring role
1990	Bacardi Valores Juveniles	Herself	Lead judge
1990	Estrellas de los 90's	Herself	Guest starring role
1990	Noche de Valores	Herself	Special musical guest star (leading role)
1991	Amor y venganza	Lucinda	Television film; leading role
1991	La Movida	Herself	Special musical guest star (leading role)
1992–93	Tenías que ser tú	Gabrielita Beltrán	Leading role
1993	Mujer, Casos de la Vida Real	Nina	Guest-starring role
1993	El Show de Cristina	Herself	Special musical guest star (leading role)
1995	Perdóname Todo	Teresa Montes	Film, leading role
1996	Morir dos veces	Martha Luján	Main antagonist
1996	La Antorche Encendida	Ángelita	Supporting role
1998–99	Soñadoras	Fernandita Guzmán	Leading role
1999	Maldito amor: Demasiado tarde		Film, Leading role
2000	Siempre te amaré	Gilda Gómez/ Laura Izaguirre	Main antagonist
2004	El Show de Cristina	Herself	Guest-starring role
2004–05	Apuesta por un amor	Cassandra Fragoso de Montaño	Main antagonist
2005	Big Brother VIP 4	Herself/contestant	Reality Show
2006	Armando Manzanero: Gracias por tu música	Herself	Biopic, TV movie
2006	Cantando por un sueño	Herself	Coach
2009	La rosa de Guadalupe		TV series
2009	Un tigre en la cama		Film, Leading role
2010	Humor a quien humor merece		TV series
2011–12	Esperanza del corazón	Gladys Guzmán	Supporting role
2013	Nueva Vida	Dona Almita	TV series, Leading role
2014	Estrella2		TV series
2015	Que te perdone Dios	Mia Montero	Supporting role
2016	Como dice el dicho	Lucía	Guest-starring Role
2017	La rosa de Guadalupe	Hortensia	1 episode, leading role

=== Theatre ===
Year	Title	Role	Notes
1984	Jesus Christ Superstar	Mary Magdalene	leading role (replacement), lead vocals, backing vocals
1984	El Títere (Pinocchio)		vocals, backing vocals
1984	Fausto Musical		leading role, vocals
1986	The Rocky Horror Show	Janet Weiss (Chelo Derecho)	leading role, lead vocals
1986	Robin Hood		leading role
1987	Malinche	La Malinche	leading role, lead vocals
1987	Cosas de papá y mamá		leading role
1999	Don Juan Tenorio	Doña Ines de Ulloa	leading role
2000	Don Juan Tenorio (Comedy)	Doña Ines de Ulloa	leading role
2006	Una Mujer Compartida		leading role
2014	Amar y Querer		leading role, lead vocals
2015	México, Lindo y Querido	Herself	leading role, lead vocals

== Discography ==
=== Studio albums ===
Year	Album title	Tracklist	Album details
1988	Ser o No Ser	"Ser o No Ser" "Corazón Al Viento" "Tren, Tren, Tren" "Tu Hombre, Yo Niña" "Cruel" "Para Decir "Te Quiero"" "Numero 1" "Valiente" "Tú" "Punto Final"	* Label: WEA * Formats: LP, cassette
1990	Amor Fasciname	"Amor Fasciname" "Contigo O Sin Tí" "Casualidad" "Lo Que Pasó, Pasó" "Por Fín" "Amame" "Si Supieras" "Tres Veces No" "Dos Veces" "Nada Nuevo Bajo El sol"	* Label: WEA * Formats: LP, CD, cassette
1991	Amor Sin Dueño	"Amor Sin Dueño (Tierra De Nadie)" "Obligame" "Como Puedes Saber" "No, No, No" "Ni Siquiera Amigos" "Volveras y Volvere" "El y Yo" "Aparentemente" "Adios Tristeza" "Para Que Engañarnos"	* Label: WEA * Formats: LP, CD, cassette
1996	Mi Corazón Se Regala	1995: "Mi Corazón Se Regala"; 1996: "Pena Negra"; 1996: "Si Tu Cuerpo"; 1997: "Ayer Hable Con mi Orgullo"	* Label: Epic Records * Formats: CD, cassette
1999	Una Mujer		* Label: Sony Music, Columbia (U.S.) * Formats: CD, digital download
2005	Radio Diva	1996: "Aquellos Ojos Verdes"	* Label: Orfeón * Formats: CD, digital download
2014	Te Sigo Queriendo	2004: "Te Sigo Queriendo"	* Label: Mixdown Records * Formats: CD, digital download
2018	México Majestuoso Vol. 1		* Label: Fonarte Latino * Formats: CD, digital download
2018	México Majestuoso Vol. 2		* Label: Fonarte Latino * Formats: CD, digital download

=== Other singles & extended plays ===
Year	Title	Details
1991	Cuando Estoy Junto A Tí	* Label: Melody Televisa * Formats: cassette
1992	Tenías Que Ser Tú" ("It Had to Be You")	* Label: Warner Bros. * Formats: CD, cassette
1993	Perdonar	* Label: Discos y Cintas Melody * Formats: CD, cassette
1999	La Danza del Milenio	* Label: Casa Pedro Domecq (Pernod Ricard) promo * Formats: CD

=== Mix albums ===
Year	Title	Singles from the album	Details
2016	Te Sigo Queriendo (Remixes)	2016: Te Sigo Queriendo (Defective Noise Club Mix)	* Label: Mixdown Records/ARDC music division/Mau Covarrubias * Formats: digital download
2017	De Fuego A Hielo" (Remixes)	2016: De Fuego a Hielo (Roy New 80's Retro Mix)	* Label: Mixdown Records/ARDC music division * Formats: digital download

=== Compilation albums ===
Year	Title	Album details
1995	Grandes Éxitos	* Label: Warner Bros. * Formats: CD, cassette
2002	Éxitos y Más de...	* Label: Warner Bros. * Formats: CD, cassette, digital download
2004	Álejandra Ávalos Grandes Éxitos	* Label: Warner Bros. * Formats: CD, digital download
2009	Todo...	* Label: Warner Bros. * Formats: CD, digital download
2011	20 Grandes Éxitos	* Label: Warner Bros. * Formats: CD, digital download

=== Other appearances ===
Year	Work	Collaborator	Comment
1984	Jesus Christ Superstar	Various artists	lead vocals
1984	El Títere (Pinocchio)	Various artists	backing vocals
1986	The Rocky Horror Show	Various artists	lead vocals
1986	Viva México '86	Various artists	Arriba México
1990	Entre Tu y Yo	Luis Gatica	vocals on "Amame Hoy"
1990	Y Si Me Dices que Sí (We'll Be Together)	Marianne	Spanish cover version, originally recorded by Sting
1991	Diciembre 25	Fher Olvera (Maná)	lead vocals on: "Tu-ru-ra"
1993	Animate: Disco Rosa	Various artists	lead vocals on: Perdonar, Amar a la Gente
1995	Perdoname Todo soundtrack	José José & Alejandra Ávalos	Te Quiero Así ft José José
1995	Boleros Por Amor y Desamor	Various artists	lead vocals on: Para Olvidarme de Ti
1995	Guitarra, Voz y Sentimiento	Various artists	lead vocals on: La Señal
1995	Navidad De Las Estrellas	Various artists	lead vocals on: Sé Feliz
1996	Disneymania (Spanish version)	Various Artists	lead vocals on "Siembra Dulzura"
1996	El Señor de las Sombras	Various artists	lead vocals on: "Ojitos Traidores, Sombras "
1997	20 Rancheras con Ellas	Various artists	lead vocals on: "Mi Corazón se Regala"
1998	Disco amarillo	Various artists	lead vocals on: "Una Madre Como Tú "
2010	Como Dos Tragos de Tequila	ft Lila Deneken and Ana Cirré	primary artist
