= Rafael Rojas (actor) =

Costa Rican film and television actor

- Born: Rafael Humberto Rojas Morales; 16 April 1961 (age 65); San José, Costa Rica
- Occupations: Actor and model
- Years active: 1984–2010; 2017
- Children: 3

Rafael Humberto Rojas Morales (born on 16 April 1961, in San José, Costa Rica) is a Costa Rican former male fashion model and actor. He is known for his work in telenovelas, theater, and Mexican cinema.

== Career ==
Rojas acted in his first play at age 7. He was educated in acting at the Conservatorio de Castella in Costa Rica. In 1984, at the age of 22, he moved to Mexico and obtained small role in a college film and in the telenovela La pobre señorita Limantour. A year later he participated in the film La Segua. His big break came three years later when he played the love interest to the singer Thalía in Quinceañera. He hosted the OTI Festival 1998 along Maribel Guardia.

Rojas has worked in over 30 telenovelas and films, including Teresa with Salma Hayek and Amor real, which won the TVyNovelas Award for "Best Telenovela of the Year" in 2003. He almost did not get the part of Amadeo Corona in Amor real because he was touring the country with one of his plays. After showing interest in the telenovela, the role was re-written so that he could still play the part. Rojas continued to perform onstage, in works like Mi mujer se llama Mauricio and Final de viernes. He has worked with television companies like Televisa and TV Azteca.

In 2004, he participated in the biographic film of telenovela producer Juan Osorio. A year later, he also recorded an album of pre-Hispanic music and started filming a new telenovela titled Flor de campo. After the early 2000s, Rojas retreated from the public eye and despite returning to acting in 2017, maintains a low social media profile. In 2017, he returned to act in the 2017 telenovela El final del Camino and movie Despertar (2017), along with actress Alejandra Toussaint, which was a co-production between Costa Rica and Mexico.

Rojas was the director of Vivo Por Elena (1998), his only directing experience.

== Personal life ==
Rafael Rojas is the son of José Francisco Rojas and María Enilda Morales.

Rojas has been married three times. The first time was when he was 19 years old in Costa Rica, to ballerina Irene Dobles, and resulted in the birth of his daughter Isla Rojas, who lives in Costa Rica with her daughter, Rojas's granddaughter, Celeste. In Mexico, he married Milena Santana (also known as María Magdadlena and Magdalena Santana García) when he was 29, and with whom he had two daughters: Neshkala and Mar. Santana and Rojas divorced in 2007.

Rojas has returned to Costa Rica, where, as of 2023, he owns two farms. In 2017, he shared that he had gotten remarried.

== Films ==
- Despertar (2017) as Ignacio
- Sala de espera (2005)
- Los zapatos de Muddy Mae (2005)
- Amores circulares (2004)
- Mi verdad (2004) as "El Flaco"
- ¿Y si te mueres? (2000)
- Chevrolet (1997) as a cop
- Mujeres infieles (1994) as the architect Muñoz
- La sombra del delator (1993)
- Blood and Sand (1989) as Maletilla
- La segua (1984)

== Telenovelas ==
- El Final del Camino (2017)
- Vidas Robadas (2010) as Pedro Antonio Fernández Vidal
- Eternamente tuya (2009) as Hernán
- Pasión (2007) as Coronel José María de Valencia
- Armadas y peligrosas (2007)
- Duelo de Pasiones (2006) as Maximo
- Mariana de la noche (2003) as Ing. Gerardo Montiel
- Amor real (2003) as Amadeo Corona
- Rayito de luz (2000) as Antonio Sánchez
- Carita de ángel (2000) as Gaspar
- Siempre te amaré (2000) as Patricio Mistral
- Serafín (1999) as Enrique
- María Isabel (1997-1998) as Rigoberto
- El alma no tiene color (1997) as Luis Diego Morales
- La sombra del otro (1996) as Manuel
- Si Dios Me Quita La Vida (1995) as Francesco
- Clarisa (1993) as Dario Bracho Sanabria
- Valentina (1993) as Julio
- Baila conmigo (1992) as Bruno
- Yo no creo en los hombres (1991) as Arturo
- Mi pequeña Soledad (1990) as Lalo
- Teresa (1989) as Mario
- Morir para vivir (1989)
- Amor en silencio (1988) as Sebastián
- Quinceañera (1987) as Gerardo
- La pobre Señorita Limantour (1987)
- El engaño (1986) as Reynaldo
- Martín Garatuza (1986) as César

== Theater ==
- Final de viernes ("Friday's finale")
- Aquel tiempo de campeones ("Those days of champions")
- Mi mujer se llama Mauricio ("Mi wife's name is Maurice")

== See also ==
- List of Costa Ricans
