= Tal como somos =

Mexican telenovela

- Genre: Telenovela; Drama
- Created by: Carlos Olmos
- Written by: Carlos Olmos; Enrique Serna; Carlos Téllez
- Directed by: Gonzalo Martínez Ortega
- Starring: Julissa; José Alonso; Leticia Calderón; Eduardo Palomo; Alejandra Ávalos; Enrique Álvarez Félix; Pedro Fernández
- Opening theme: Mood Indigo by Dámaso Pérez Prado
- Country of origin: Mexico
- Original language: Spanish
- No. of episodes: 125

Production
- Executive producer: Juan Osorio
- Production locations: Mexico City, Mexico
- Cinematography: Antonio Acevedo
- Running time: 21-22 minutes
- Production company: Televisa

Original release
- Network: Canal de las Estrellas
- Release: October 26, 1987 – April 15, 1988

Tal como somos (English title: Such as we are) is a Mexican telenovela produced by Julissa and Juan Osorio for Televisa in 1987. It is an original story by Carlos Olmos and Enrique Serna and was directed by Antonio Acevedo.

Julissa and José Alonso starred as protagonists, while Alejandra Ávalos and Enrique Álvarez Félix starred as antagonists. Leticia Calderón and Eduardo Palomo starred as stellar performances.

== Plot ==
Ángel is a fisherman from Mazatlán who has become widowed. He moves with his family to Mexico City in search of fortune. When they arrive, the family is assaulted, and the thieves cut off the ears of Ángel's daughter Margarita in order to take her earrings. After this ominous beginning, the fisherman and his family settle in a building where they meet Eva, a very unhappy woman who is tortured by her husband and daughter. Miguel, her disabled husband, pretends to be a good person but is a born criminal. Years ago, he raped a woman and Eva not only forgave him but raised the child as her own.

Miguel blames Eva for his accident and has poisoned her daughter Delia against her. Delia's father has such a strong hold on her that she is practically "in love" with him. She hates Eva, and as a manifestation of her morbid nature, she spies on her parents when Miguel vainly tries to have sex with his wife. This is another mental torture inflicted on Eva because, in reality, Miguel only pretends to be disabled. Eva, frustrated as a wife, mother, and woman, finds true passion in the arms of Ángel.

== Cast ==
- Julissa as Eva Montenegro Andere
- José Alonso as Ángel Cisneros
- Leticia Calderón as Margarita Cisneros Agudelo
- Eduardo Palomo as Octavio Pérez
- Enrique Álvarez Félix as Miguel Aponte Enriquez
- Alejandra Ávalos as Nuria Almonte Hernández
- Pedro Fernández as Valerio Cisneros
- Manuel Ojeda as Pablo
- Ernesto Gómez Cruz as Marcelo
- Juan Peláez
- Sonia Furió
- Alejandro Ibarra
- Raúl Buenfil as Gabino
- Cecilia Tijerina as Maribel
- Luz María Jerez as Beatriz
- Irma Dorantes as Sara
- Eugenio Derbez as Roberto
- Alejandra Vidal as Lucinda
- Licha Guzmán
- Dolores Beristáin
- Bruno Rey

== Awards and nominations ==
Year	Award	Category	Nominee	Result
1988	6th TVyNovelas Awards	Best Antagonist Actor	Enrique Álvarez Félix	Nominated
1988	6th TVyNovelas Awards	Best Experienced Actor	Ernesto Gómez Cruz	Won
