= Las fieras =

Mexican telenovela

- Genre: Telenovela
- Created by: Luisa Xamar
- Directed by: Alfredo Saldaña
- Starring: Raquel Olmedo; Héctor Gómez
- Country of origin: Mexico
- Original language: Spanish

Production
- Executive producer: Ernesto Alonso

Original release
- Network: Televisa
- Release: 1972

Las fieras is a Mexican telenovela produced by Ernesto Alonso for Televisa in 1972.

== Cast ==
- Raquel Olmedo as Edith Brisson
- Héctor Gómez as Pierre Brisson
- Anita Blanch as Madame Brisson
- José Alonso as Jean Brisson
- Norma Lazareno as Helene
- Ricardo Blume as Richard
- Teresa Velázquez
- Miguel Manzano
- Javier Ruán
- Lorena Velázquez
- David Estuardo
- Dolores Beristáin
- Lilia Aragón
- Margarita Cortés
- Carlos Arguelles as Jean Brisson as a child
- José Antonio Ferral
- Talina Fernández
- Lola Berinstain
