= Tiempo de amar =

Mexican telenovela

- Genre: Telenovela; Drama
- Written by: Alberto Cura
- Directed by: Rafael Banquells
- Starring: Lupita D'Alessio; Fernando Allende; Kitty de Hoyos; Claudio Obregón; Ernesto Laguardia; Alejandra Ávalos; Adriana Roel; Dolores Beristáin
- Opening theme: Ni guerra ni paz by Lupita D'Alessio
- Country of origin: Mexico
- Original language: Spanish
- No. of episodes: 25

Production
- Executive producer: Silvia Pinal
- Cinematography: Gabriel Vázquez Bulman
- Production company: Televisa

Original release
- Network: Canal de las Estrellas
- Release: July 4 – December 19, 1987

Related
- Yesenia

Tiempo de amar (English title:Time to love) is a Mexican telenovela produced by Silvia Pinal for Televisa in 1987. It is an original story by Alberto Cura and directed by Rafael Banquells.

Lupita D'Alessio and Fernando Allende starred as protagonists.

== Plot ==
This is the story of Carolina, who falls for Luis Alberto and are happy for some time, but she has an incurable disease that little by little leads her to death, leaving behind a child.

== Cast ==
- Lupita D'Alessio as Carolina Monteverde
- Fernando Allende as Luis Alberto Carrasco
- Kitty de Hoyos as Bárbara Ornelas
- Claudio Obregón as Rafael Monteverde
- Ernesto Laguardia as Héctor
- Alejandra Ávalos as Marcela
- Adriana Roel as Mercedes Monteverde
- Dolores Beristáin as Lola
- Alejandra Guzmán as Celia
- Alfonso Iturralde as Carlos
- Héctor Gómez as Dr. Adolfo Klauz
- Eugenia Avendaño as Esperanza
- Dina de Marco as Margot
- Adriana Parra as Yolanda
- Chela Nájera as Nadia Levison
- Marcela López Rey as Sonia
- Manuel Guizar as Canales
- Alvaro Cerviño as Damián
- Emoé de la Parra as Inés
- María Prado as Violeta
