= Tenías que ser tú =

Tenías que ser tú may refer to:

- Tenías que ser tú (1992 TV series), a Mexican telenovela
- Tenías que ser tú (2018 TV series), a Mexican telenovela
