= Clarisa =

- Genre: Telenovela
- Created by: Ramón Obon; Lupita Obón; Pilar Obón; María Teresa García
- Written by: Ramón Obon; Lupita Obón; Pilar Obón; María Teresa García; Dinorah Issak
- Directed by: Antulio Jiménez Pons
- Starring: Gabriela Roel; Manuel Landeta; Laura Flores; Ariel López Padilla; Rolando de Castro Sr. David Reynoso; Regina Torné
- Theme music composer: Ricardo Murguía/Jorge Murguía
- Opening theme: Clarisa by Ricardo Murguía
- Ending theme: Clarisa by Ricardo Murguía
- Country of origin: Mexico
- Original language: Spanish
- No. of episodes: 65

Production
- Executive producer: Juan Osorio
- Cinematography: Antulio Jiménez Pons
- Running time: 41-44 minutes
- Production company: Televisa

Original release
- Network: Canal de las Estrellas
- Release: March 15 – June 11, 1993

Clarisa is a Mexican telenovela produced by Juan Osorio for Televisa in 1993.

Gabriela Roel and Manuel Landeta starred as protagonists, while Laura Flores starred as main antagonist.

== Plot ==
In the 1930s, Guillermo González León resides in a vast estate known as "Los Arrayanes" with his two beautiful daughters. The eldest, Elide, is characterized as frivolous, passionate, and ambitious, whereas the younger daughter, Clarisa, exudes cheerfulness, sweetness, and sensitivity. Elide harbors bitterness due to her belief that her father favors Clarisa, leading to a profound hatred for her sister.

Clarisa is placed in a girls' school, which stifles her natural spirit of freedom and her strong desire to explore the world. Despite this, Clarisa deeply loves her father, and he reciprocates that love. Don Guillermo experiences anguish over the estrangement and hatred Elide feels towards Clarisa.

== Cast ==
- Gabriela Roel as Clarisa González León
- Manuel Landeta as Dr. Roberto Arellano/Rolando Garza
- Laura Flores as Elide González León
- Ariel López Padilla as Gastón Bracho Sanabria
- Rolando de Castro Sr. as Don Guillermo González León
- David Reynoso as Don Jaime Bracho Sanabria
- Regina Torné as Doña Beatriz de Bracho Sanabria
- Rafael Rojas as Darío Bracho Sanabria
- Raúl Buenfil as Dr. Javier
- Aarón Hernán as Dr. Héctor Brenes
- Dolores Beristáin as Dolores de Brenes
- Germán Robles as Eleuterio Cardona
- Leticia Perdigón as Aurelia Bracho Sanabria
- Ramiro Orci as Santiago
- Alicia Montoya as Casilda
- Carmelita González as Sofía
- Claudia Guzmán as Rosita
- Toño Infante as Efraín
- Luis Rizo as Antonio
- Guadalupe Deneken as Ofelia
- Blas García as Balmaseda
- Guillermo de Alvarado "Condorito" as Pichón
- Carlos Navarro as Genaro Martínez
- Marisol Centeno as Itzel
- Guillermo Rivas as Sacerdote
- Luis Aguilar as Neto
- Tere Mondragón as Teacher Josefina
- Miriam Calderón as Adriana
- Ana Bertha Espín
- Maty Huitrón
- Isabel Andrade
- Rigoberto Carmona
- Esteban Franco
- Claudia Marín
- Alejandra Murga
- Guadalupe Bolaños
- Polo Salazar
- Luis Couturier
- Dunia Saldívar
- Ramón Menéndez
- Maritza Aldaba
- Maricarmen Vela
- Consuelo Duval
- Ricardo Carrión
- Alejandro Ciangherotti Jr.
- Miguel Ángel Fuentes
- Anthony Álvarez
- Melba Luna
- Palmira Santz

== Awards ==
Year	Award	Category	Nominee	Result
1994	12th TVyNovelas Awards	Best Antagonist Actress	Laura Flores	Nominated
