= Juana Iris =

Mexican telenovela

- Genre: Telenovela; Romance; Drama
- Created by: Ricardo Rentería
- Written by: Ricardo Rentería
- Directed by: Julio Castillo
- Starring: Victoria Ruffo; Valentin Trujillo; Carmen Montejo; Carlos Cámara; Gabriela Ruffo; Adela Noriega; Pedro Fernández
- Theme music composer: Harold Faltermeyer; Giorgio Moroder
- Opening theme: Thief of hearts
- Country of origin: Mexico
- Original language: Spanish
- No. of episodes: 170

Production
- Executive producers: Carlos Téllez; Lucero Suárez
- Running time: 21-22 minutes
- Production company: Televisa

Original release
- Network: Canal de las Estrellas
- Release: April 22 – December 16, 1985

Related
- Los años felices; Muchachita

Juana Iris is a Mexican telenovela produced by Carlos Téllez and Lucero Suárez for Televisa in 1985.

Victoria Ruffo and Valentin Trujillo starred as protagonists, while Blanca Guerra starred IN main antagonist. Carmen Montejo, Adriana Roel and Raymundo Capetillo co-starred.

== Cast ==
- Victoria Ruffo as Juana Iris Madrigal Martínez
- Valentin Trujillo as Bernardo de la Riva Valdivia
- Raymundo Capetillo as Rafael
- Pedro Fernández as Juan Bernardo de la Riva Madrigal
- Adela Noriega as Romina Moret Toledo
- Blanca Guerra as Magali Santacilia
- Carmen Montejo as María Luisa
- Macaria as Elisa
- Adriana Roel as Virtudes
- Carlos Cámara as Nicolás
- Toño Mauri as Mauricio
- Fernando Rubio as Néstor
- Gabriela Ruffo as Gloria
- Leonor Llausás as Gudelia
- Claudia Ramírez as Montserrat
- Rafael Sánchez Navarro as Cristóbal Derbez
- Karina Duprez as Rosa
- Patricia Dávalos as Leticia
- Alonso Echánove as Roque
- Javier Díaz Dueñas as Lic. Castañeira
- Eduardo Pons as Martín
- Sergio Barrios as Father Benito
- Manuel Landeta as Jaime
- Eduardo Palomo as Fernando
- Angélica Chain as Marcela
- Claudio Brook as Don Alberto
- Emoé de la Parra as Patricia
- Alejandra Meyer as Nacarada
- María Montejo as Celadora
- Fuensanta as Ninón
- Ana Luisa Peluffo as Chata
- Lucía Paillés as Simona
- Silvia Caos as Petra
- Bertha Moss as Raquel
- Joana Brito as Toña
- Víctor Lozoya as Roque
- José Antonio Serrano as Gerardo
- Sergio Silva as Lalo
- Gabriel Berthier as Juan
- Gilberto Román as Alejo
- Rosa Carmina as Dora
- Armando Palomo
- Manuel Saval
- Leonardo Daniel

== Awards ==
Year	Award	Category	Nominee	Result
1986	4th TVyNovelas Awards	Best Original Story or Adaptation	Ricardo Rentería	Nominated
1986	4th TVyNovelas Awards	Best Male Revelation	Pedro Fernández	Nominated
1986	4th TVyNovelas Awards	Best Female Debut	Adela Noriega	Nominated
