= Manuel Landeta =

Mexican singer and actor of telenovelas (born 1958)

- Born: José Manuel Goenaga Jassan; October 5, 1958 (age 67)
- Occupations: Actor, singer
- Years active: 1983–present
- Children: 2

Manuel Landeta (born José Manuel Goenaga Jassan on October 5, 1958) is a Mexican singer and actor of telenovelas. His two sons Imanol and Jordi Landeta are also actors and singers.

== Career ==
Manuel Landeta started his acting career at the age of 26 in the telenovela La pasión de Isabela ("Isabela's passion"). The following year he was part of the cast in Juana Iris another telenovela on Televisa. In 1986 he obtained his first starring role in Martín Garatuza, as the character of the same name in a story that takes place in Colonial Mexico. He also participated in the plays José el soñador (1998) and Loco por tí (2000). In 2001 he recorded an album titled Mírame and in 2004 he made his first two films.

As of 2005, he participated in Bailando por México (the Mexican version of Dancing with the Stars). He is part of the cast of the erotic show Sólo para mujeres and of the play Anita la huerfanita (the Mexican version of Annie) with Ana Layevska. He also dances and takes off his clothes on the erotic show called Solo Para Mujeres.

== Filmography ==
Television roles
Year	Title	Roles	Notes
1984	La pasión de Isabela	Unknown role	
1985	Juana Iris	Jaime	
1986	Martín Garatuza	Martín Garatuza	Main role; 90 episodes
1989	El cristal empañado	Claudio	
1992	Ángeles sin paraíso	Abelardo	
1993	Clarisa	Roberto Arellano / Rolando Garza	
1996	Sentimientos ajenos	Miguel Ángel	
1996	Morir dos veces	Cristóbal	
1998	Vivo por Elena	Hugo	
1999	El niño que vino del mar	Carlos Criail	
2001–2003	Mujer, casos de la vida real	Unknown role	2 episodes
2002	Clase 406	Gonzalo Acero	
2003	Velo de novia	Román Ruiz	
2004	Amy, la niña de la mochila azul	Tritón / Ivanovich Petrovich	
2004	Rubí	Lucío Montemayor	
2005	Piel de otoño	Víctor Guitiérrez	
2005	Vecinos	Andrés	Episode: "El ataque de las cucarachas"
2005	Barrera de amor	Víctor García Betancourt	
2007	Destilando amor	Rosenmberg	
2007	Yo amo a Juan Querendón	Unknown role	
2007	La fea más bella	Esteban	
2008	Fuego en la sangre	Anselmo Cruz	
2008	La rosa de Guadalupe	Manuel	Episode: "Saber amar"
2008–2009	Mañana es para siempre	Graciano	2 episodes
2009	Los simuladores	Frank Millan	Episode: "Venganza"
2009–2010	Mar de amor	León Parra Ibáñez	Main Antagonist
2010	Mujeres asesinas	Alberto	Episode: "Marta, Manipuladora"
2010–2011	Teresa	Rubén Cáceres Muro	Main cast; 137 episodes
2012–2013	Corazón valiente	Bernardo del Castillo	Main Antagonist
2013	Corazón indomable	Teobaldo	
2014	La Impostora	Adriano Ferrer	Main role; 117 episodes
2015	Amor de barrio	Edmundo	Main cast; 92 episodes
2016	Un camino hacia el destino	Hernán	Antagonist; 97 episodes
2017	Mi marido tiene familia	Augusto	Recurring role (season 1); 24 episodes
2019–2020	El Señor de los Cielos	Cecilio Guitiérrez	Recurring role (season 7)
2021	Contigo sí	Sandro	

== Awards and nominations ==
Year	Award	Category	Nominated works	Result
2014	Premios Tu Mundo			
2014	Premios Tu Mundo	First Actor	La impostora	Won
