= Fernando Allende =

Artist from Mexico

- Born: Luis Fernando Allende Arenas; November 10, 1952 (age 73); Mexico City, Mexico
- Years active: 1971–present
- Website: http://www.fernandoallende.com

Luis Fernando Allende Arenas (born November 10, 1952) is a Mexican artist and entertainer who has also worked in various production roles during his career.

== Filmography ==
=== Telenovelas ===
- Muchacha italiana viene a casarse (2014-2015) - Sergio Ángeles
- La Mujer Del Vendaval (2012-2013) as Luciano
- Esperanza del Corazón (2011) as Orlando Duarte
- Sortilegio (2009) as Antonio
- Besos prohibidos (1999) as José Luis
- Maria Bonita (1995) as José Santos/Damar Santoyo
- Sangre de lobos (1991)
- Amor de nadie as Guillermo (1990)
- Grecia as Fernando (1987)
- Tiempo de amar (1987)
- Tiempo de Vivir (1985)
- Modelos, S.A. (1981)
- Corazón salvaje (1977) as Renato
- El milagro de vivir (1975)
- Ana del aire as Gerardo (1974)
- El amor tiene cara de mujer (1971)

=== TV series ===
- Mexican Dynasties (2019) as Himself
- Como dice el dicho (2014) as Roberto
- Superboy (1989) as Club Owner
- Miami Vice (1986) as Tico Arriola
- Hunter (1985) as Moreno
- The Hitchhiker (1985) as Victor
- Murder, She Wrote (1985) as Miguel Santana
- Master of the Game (1984) as George Mellis
- Hart to Hart (1983) as Fernando
- Flamingo Road (1981–1982) as Julio Sánchez
- The Phoenix (1981) as Diego DeVarga

=== Movies ===
- Maria (2010)
- El Cimarrón (2006)
- Slayer (film) (2006) as Luis
- Siempre te amaré (2004) as Lead
- Naked Lies (1998) as Damian Medina
- Angely smerti (1993)
- Stalingrad (1989) as a Captain Rubén Ruiz Ibárruri, Hero of Soviet Union and a great hero of Battle of Stalingrad, son of Spanish Communist Leader Dolores Ibárruri
- Beverly Hills Brats (1989) as Roberto
- Un Hombre y una mujer con suerte (1988)
- The Alamo: Thirteen Days to Glory (1987) as Alamonte
- Murder in Three Acts (1986) as Ricardo Montoya
- Heartbreaker (1983) as Beto
- Johnny Chicano (1981)
- El Lobo negro (1981)
- Duelo a muerte (1981) as Carlos Aceves/El Lobo Negro
- Con la muerte en ancas (1980) as Casey Kelly
- El Contrabando del paso (1980)
- El hombre de los hongos (1980) as Sebastián
- Frontera (1980) as Fernando
- Verano salvaje (1980)
- La Venganza del lobo negro (1980)
- The Streets of L.A. (1979) as Ramon "Gallo" Zamora
- La Ilegal (1979)
- Te quiero (1979)
- La Guera Rodriguez (1978)
- La Coquito as Julio (1977)
- ¿Y ahora qué, señor fiscal? (1977)
- La Virgen de Guadalupe (1976) as Juan Diego
- El Pacto (1976) as Sergio
- Negro es un bello color (1974) as Mario
- El Desconocido (1974)
- El Primer amor (1974)
- El Amor tiene cara de mujer (1973)
- Mecánica nacional (1972)
- María (1972) as Efraín
- Para servir a usted (1971)
