= Vivo Por Elena =

Mexican telenovela

- Genre: Telenovela; Romance; Drama
- Created by: Delia Fiallo
- Written by: Marcia del Río; María Cristina Ribal; Ricardo Tejeda
- Directed by: Sergio Jiménez; Manolo García; Rafael Rojas
- Starring: Victoria Ruffo; Saúl Lisazo; Ana Patricia Rojo; Sebastián Ligarde; Cecilia Gabriela; Anahi
- Opening theme: Vivo por ella by Andrea Bocelli & Marta Sánchez
- Country of origin: Mexico
- Original language: Spanish
- No. of episodes: 115

Production
- Executive producer: Juan Osorio
- Production locations: Filming; Televisa San Ángel; Mexico City, Mexico
- Cinematography: Karlos Velázquez; Alejandro Álvarez Ceniceros
- Camera setup: Multi-camera
- Running time: 41-44 minutes
- Production company: Televisa

Original release
- Network: Canal de las Estrellas
- Release: April 6 – September 11, 1998

Related
- La señorita Elena (1967); La señorita Elena (1974–1975); Atrévete (1986)

Vivo por Elena (English: I Live for Elena) is a Mexican telenovela produced by Juan Osorio for Televisa in 1998. The telenovela has been repeated several times on different channels since its original airing.

On Monday, April 6, 1998, Canal de las Estrellas started broadcasting Vivo Por Elena weekdays at 8:00pm, replacing Desencuentro. The last episode was broadcast on Friday, September 11, 1998, with Camila replacing it the following Monday.

In the United States, it was first broadcast on Univision from July 13, 1998, through December 30, 1998, weekdays at 8:00pm Eastern/7:00pm Central, replacing Esmeralda. The last episode was aired on December 30, 1998, with La usurpadora replacing it the following Monday.

Victoria Ruffo and Saúl Lisazo starred as protagonists, Cecilia Gabriela is a co-protagonist, while Ana Patricia Rojo, Sebastián Ligarde, Jean Duverger, Pablo Montero and Julieta Bracho starred as antagonists.

== Plot ==
Elena (Victoria Ruffo) is a poor young woman who while attending university to gain a degree in psychology, meets a rich young man named Ernesto (Sebastián Ligarde) whose only goal is to be with as many women as possible, through deception and on more than one occasion, drugs.

After this Elena refuses to see Ernesto again, and swears off ever falling in love again because she believes herself to be damaged because of Ernesto. Elena then focuses solely on her education and graduating so that she can work and help support her two sisters, Chelo (Cecilia Gabriela) and Talita (Anahi).

Chelo is her older sister who was forced to work in a cabaret to support her two younger sisters, Elena and Talita. After graduating she goes to interview at the house of the judge Juan Alberto Montiel (Saúl Lisazo) for the position of particular tutor for Juan Alberto's son who in the absence of his mother Silvia (Ana Patricia Rojo) has become unruly and disrespectful.

Upon first interviewing she is turned down because Juan Alberto believes her too young and inexperienced to properly care for his son. Juan Alberto's adopted mother is Rebeca (Julieta Bracho), who coincidentally is the mother of Ernesto, and therefore Ernesto and Juan Alberto are like brothers in the sense that they grew up together.

Rebeca believing that Juanito (Imanol), Juan Alberto's son, has been too unruly goes to Elena's house to ask her to take the job because no one else has been interested. Elena arrives at the big house and almost immediately has a profound effect on Juanito and little by little Juan Alberto begins to see a change in his son and realizes that it's all thanks to Elena.

Slowly, as Juan and Elena fall in love, the other characters are adamant in ensuring both of them are not happy together.

== Cast ==
- Victoria Ruffo as Elena Carvajal del Monteverde
- Saúl Lisazo as Juan Alberto Montiel
- Ana Patricia Rojo as Silvia Fonseca de Montiel/Raquel Duran
- Sebastián Ligarde as Ernesto de los Monteros
- Arturo Peniche as Héctor Rubalcava
- Cecilia Gabriela as Consuelo "Chelo" Carvajal
- Julieta Bracho as Rebecca de los Monteros
- Patricia Álvarez as Lumara
- Anahí as Natalia "Talita" Carvajal
- Sergio Catalán as Adolfo
- Maty Huitrón as Simona Pacheco
- Imanol as Juan "Juanito" Montiel Fonseca
- Carlos Rotzinger as Lic. Gustavo Linares
- Adriana Lavat as Adriana
- Adriana Barraza as Hilda "La Machín"
- Pablo Montero as Luis Pablo Moreno
- José María Torre as Julio
- Manuel Landeta as Hugo Milanés
- Kelchie Arizmendi as Francisca "Panchita"
- Carlos Espejel as Oscar Moreno
- Alejandra Procuna as Ely
- Leonorilda Ochoa as Aurora
- Sergio Corona as Don Fermín de los Reyes de Tizayuca
- Luis de Icaza as Demetrio Rojo
- Anel as Jenny
- Jean Duverger as El Güero/El Negro
- Ofelia Guilmáin as Luz María Villalpando "Doña Luz"
- Lucía Guilmáin as Enedina Pancardo
- Lucila Mariscal as Gardenia
- Miguel Garza as Sergio
- Hilda Aguirre as Érica Barragán Montes de Oca
- Julián Bravo as Francisco "Paco" Valenzuela
- Giorgio Palacios as Lalo
- Kristoff as El Pecas
- Gerardo Gallardo as El Sapo
- Serrana as Yolanda
- Armando Quiñones as Nicho
- Claudia Silva as Jimena
- Tony Flores as Bertoldo
- Yadira Santana as Raisa Martín
- Mónica Prado as Berta
- Héctor Cruz as Roque
- Tania Prado as Noemí
- Pablo Cheng as Poli
- Erika Monarrez as Casimira
- Jessica Segura as Marta
- Ernesto Valenzuela as Larry
- Luz María Aguilar as Abril
- Paco Ibáñez as Ausencio
- Niurka as Mirta "La Cubana"
- Alejandra Meyer as Mrs. Garay/Director of the prison
- Constantino Costas as Dr. Justo Cansino
- José Antonio Ferral as Genovivo "El Hacendado"
- Anthony Álvarez as Leandro
- Juan José Origel as El Panameño
- Sergio Jiménez
