= Ernesto Laguardia =

Mexican actor (born 1959)

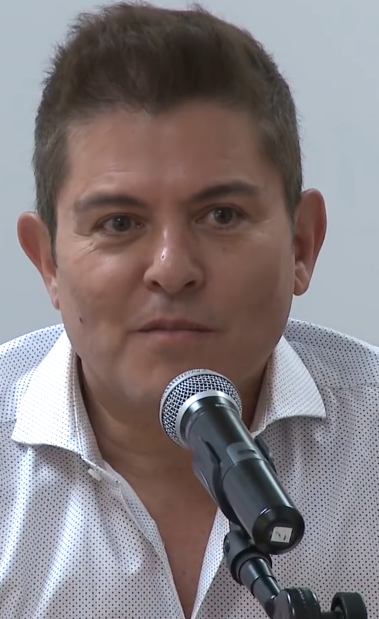
- Laguardia in 2021
- Born: Ernesto Laguardia; October 5, 1959 (age 67); Mexico City, Mexico

Ernesto Laguardia (Spanish pronunciation: [eɾˈnesto laˈɣwaɾðja]; born October 5, 1959) is a Mexican actor known for his performances in Mexican telenovelas.

== Biography ==
Laguardia was born in Mexico City and modeled in elementary school. His work eventually led him to temporary contracts with Mexican and international companies. He also participated as a dancer in the television show Sabado del Rock.

Before getting his degree in Business Administration, he searched for job opportunities on radio stations. He started as a messenger and in a few months he became a news reporter. During the two following years, he interviewed Julio Iglesias, Miguel Bosé, Armando Manzanero, and Rocío Dúrcal and others. Ernesto graduated from Business Administration ITAM (Instituto Tecnológico Autónomo de México), he also studied economics but only graduated with a degree in business.

Although Laguardia made his acting debut in Dune (1984) directed by David Lynch, it was three years before he got his first starring role in a telenovela; since then he has appeared in 17 telenovelas so far, including Quinceañera starring Adela Noriega and Thalía; Mi Querida Isabel; Alondra; Lazos de Amor; Desencuentro; Laberinto de Pasiones; La Antorcha Encendida; Amigas y Rivales; Amor Real and Amigos X Siempre.

He has also appeared in movies such as La Ley de las Calles, Ladrones de tumbas, Aquí Espantan, Maria Metralla, Cambio del Destino, Novia que te vea, The Wrong Man, and De noche vienes, Esmeralda.

He also studied Direction and Production at the University of New York, where he received a Masters on these subjects. Since 1996 he has been developing projects through his companies Foro 3 S.C and Producciones Ernesto Laguardia. While he lived in New York City he studied acting in Carnegie Hall with Wynn Handman.

He joined Hoy program as Star magazine and was in the soap Amor Real, produced by Carla Estrada, he played Cristobal in Estrada's Alborada. In 2008 Ernesto returned to Hoy and had a small role in the telenovela Fuego en la sangre.

In 2012, Laguardia played the role of Romulo Ancira, the main villain of Corona de lágrimas. Ten years later, he reprised the same role in the second season of the soap opera in 2022. In 2025, Laguardia starred in the telenovela Amanecer as Íñigo Tarragona, the lover and accomplice of Atocha Carranza (Ana Belena).

== Filmography ==
=== Films ===
Year	Title	Role	Notes
1984	Dune	Harkonnen's Victim	Uncredited
1989	La ley de las calles	Roque	
1990	Imagen de muerte		
1990	Ladrones de tumbas	Manolo Andrade	
1991	María la guerrillera		
1992	Cambiando el destino	Toño el representante	
1993	¡Aquí espaantan!	Alejandro	
1993	The Wrong Man	Detective Ortega	
1993	Principio y fin	Gabriel Botero	
1994	Novia que te vea	Eduardo Saavedra	
1997	De noche vienes, Esmeralda	Pedro, accusing husband	
2002	¡Qué padre!	Host	Television film

=== Television ===
Year	Title	Role	Notes
1985-1986	Cachún cachún ra ra!	Neto	
1983	Nataly	Raúl, blind boy	
1985	Los años pasan	Cuco	
1986	Pobre juventud	Muelas	
1986	Marionetas	Sergio	
1986	Cautiva	Sergio	
1987	Tiempo de amar	Héctor	
1987	Quinceañera	Pancho	Lead role
1988	Flor y canela	Pablo	Lead role
1989	Hora marcada	Gustavo	Episode: "Doblemente yo"
1990	Cenizas y diamantes	Julián Gallardo	Lead role
1992	La sonrisa del Diablo	Rafael Galicia	
1993	Los parientes pobres	Jesús Sánchez (Chucho)	Lead role
1995	Alondra	Carlos Támez	Lead role
1995-1996	Lazos de amor	Bernardo Rivas	
1996	La antorcha encendida	Gral. Ignacio Allende	
1996-1997	Mi querida Isabel	Luis Daniel Márquez Riquelme	
1997-1998	María Isabel	Luis Torres	
1997-1998	Desencuentro	Luis	
1998	Gotita de amor	Dr. Alberto	
1999-2000	Cuento de Navidad	Miguel	
2000	Amigos x siempre	Salvador Vidal Ruvalcaba	
2001	Amigas y rivales	Ernesto Laguardia	
2001	Aventuras en el tiempo	Insurgente	
2002	Teletón	Himself	Host
2002	El club	Himself	Host
2003–2005	Código F.A.M.A.	Himself	Host
2003	Amor real	Humberto Peñalver	
2003-2006	Hoy	Himself	Host
2005	Alborada	Cristóbal de Lara	
2006-2007	Mundo de fieras	Leonardo Barrios	
2007	Amor sin maquillaje		
2007	Fuego en la sangre	Juan José Robles	
2012-2023	Corona de lágrimas	Rómulo Ancira	Main role (seasons 1–2); 222 episodes
2015	Amores con trampa	Santiago Velasco	
2019	Silvia Pinal, frente a tí	Julio, Gobernador de Tlaxcala	
2021-2022	Contigo sí	Gerardo Vega	Main role
2024	Papás por conveniencia	Jason	
2025	Amanecer	Íñigo Tarragona	Main role
