= El padre Gallo =

Mexican telenovela

- Genre: Telenovela; Romance; Drama
- Created by: Arturo Moya Grau
- Written by: M.J. Rubio
- Directed by: Gonzalo Martínez Ortega
- Starring: Ernesto Gómez Cruz; Alejandra Ávalos; Fernando Ciangherotti; Saby Kamalich; Narciso Busquets; Antonio Medellín; Humberto Dupeyrón; Dolores Beristáin
- Opening theme: El padre Gallo by Leonardo Velázquez
- Country of origin: Mexico
- Original language: Spanish
- No. of episodes: 97

Production
- Executive producer: Juan Osorio
- Production locations: Cuetzalan, Puebla
- Running time: 21-22 minutes
- Production company: Televisa

Original release
- Network: Canal de las Estrellas
- Release: November 3, 1986 – March 25, 1987

Related
- Martín Garatuza; Senda de gloria; El padre Gallo (1970)

El padre Gallo (English title:The priest Gallo) is a Mexican telenovela produced by Juan Osorio for Televisa in 1986. It is an original story of Arturo Moya Grau, adapted by M.J. Rubio and directed by Gonzalo Martínez Ortega. It starred first actor Ernesto Gómez Cruz with Alejandra Ávalos and Fernando Ciangherotti.

== Plot ==
The setting is the small town of Cuetzalan which El Gallo, a bandit fugitive from justice who plans to avoid being found reaches. He decides on hiding in the village so no one ever suspect where he is. There he is confused by the village faithful for the new priest it was expected would come to town. The problem is that this priest died on the way and the Bandit found his body.

As he was dressed as an inmate he decided to take the cassock and dress himself in it. El Gallo has no choice but to go along with the villagers and impersonate a priest, a point in his favor because no one would ever suspect a priest of being a fugitive from justice. Thus, "The priest Gallo" becomes the new priest of Cuetzalán that despite his obvious inexperience, soon wins the sympathy and affection of all the inhabitants.

Alongside a love story starring Ray and Patricio develops. The first is a beautiful girl who disguises herself as a man for the day to keep her jobs, because if they were to discover that she was a woman she would be fired immediately. While the second is a young man who knows one night while dressed as a woman and falls for her.

Ray rightful, but suffers from not being able to see with Patricio during the day because she is not willing to lose the job that she worked so hard to achieve. Therefore, two lovers appear only at night, when Ray can show your true self and live freely her relationship with Patricio without arousing suspicion.

== Cast ==
- Ernesto Gómez Cruz as Padre Gallo
- Alejandra Ávalos as Ray
- Fernando Ciangherotti as Patricio
- Saby Kamalich as Aurora
- Narciso Busquets as Don Indalecio
- Antonio Medellín as Víctor
- Humberto Dupeyrón as El Mudo
- Dolores Beristáin as Doña Nati
- Odiseo Bichir as Juan Francisco
- Socorro Bonilla as Yolanda
- Sergio Acosta as Javier
- Rosa María Moreno as Carmela
- Evangelina Martínez as Miriam
- Guillermo Gil as Ramón
- Marcela Camacho as Nina
- Edith Kleiman as Gladys
- Ignacio Retes as Fabián
- Paco Rabell as Eulalio
- Uriel Chávez as Güicho
- Licha Guzmán as Meche
- Sergio Sánchez as Gaspar
- Mario Valdés as Cipriano
- Madeleine Vivo as Mina
- Mario Casillas
