= Muchachita =

Mexican telenovela

- Genre: Telenovela; Drama
- Created by: Ricardo Rentería
- Directed by: Julio Castillo
- Starring: Lourdes Munguía; Gonzalo Vega; Talina Fernández; Beatriz Aguirre; Manuel Saval; Ana Bertha Lepe; José Carlos Ruiz; Bertha Moss
- Country of origin: Mexico
- Original language: Spanish
- No. of episodes: 130

Production
- Executive producers: Carlos Téllez; Lucero Suárez
- Cinematography: Albino Corrales
- Production company: Televisa

Original release
- Network: Canal de las Estrellas
- Release: December 17, 1985 – June 16, 1986

Related
- Juana Iris; Martín Garatuza

Muchachita (English title:Girl) is a Mexican telenovela produced by Carlos Téllez and Lucero Suárez for Televisa in 1986. It is an original story and adaptation of the fotonovela "Muchachita" of Ricardo Rentería. It starred Lourdes Munguía, Gonzalo Vega, Talina Fernández, Beatriz Aguirre and Manuel Saval.

== Plot ==
Maribel Montesinos is a beautiful girl from a wealthy family who is engaged to José Manuel Montesinos, another boy of good family. But shortly before the wedding, Maribel suffers a blow: she is a victim of rape, and as a result is pregnant. Maribel, initially, is undecided about whether to have the baby, but eventually decides to continue her pregnancy, thanks to the values instilled her mother when she was alive. However, her father, Don Felipe, opposes her decision and Maribel decides to break her commitment to José Manuel. She initially doesn't give any explanation, but ultimately feels obliged to tell the truth. José Manuel does not react well to the news and asks her to abort, she indignantly denies it and despite the rejection of society and her family circle, she decides to have the baby against all odds.

Maribel's father decides to take her to live in his country house to avoid the gossip of the town, but there but there they discover who was responsible for the rape: Pascual Sánchez, an alcoholic bricklayer. After the birth, Felipe gives the newborn to Pascual, while he decides to take Maribel to Paris. Maribel refuses, but her father threatens to never tell her who he gave her daughter to if she doesn't go with him.

Rosa, Maribel's daughter, grows up in a neighborhood in the company of Ticha, a noble woman raising her as if she were her own daughter. Rosa is continually harassed by Pascual, who is still an alcoholic. As an adult, Rosa helps Ticha at her fruit stand. She also falls in love with Chucho, a young man blind from birth who lives with his mother, Nena Martinez, an actress who had her son at an advanced age.

When the economic situation of Rosa and Ticha becomes insecure, Rosa offers to go to sell fruit on the streets in front of Bellas Artes. In the streets, Rosa meets José Manuel, the former fiancé of her birth mother. José Manuel is now professor of literature at the university, and is attracted to Rosa and want to transform her into a cultured and refined woman. Since his disappointment with Maribel, José Manuel became sullen and reluctant to engage in another relationship, so he feels very happy when he sees in Rosa's innocence another opportunity to find love.

José Manuel takes Rosa to his home, and in exchange for the refinement classes he gives her, she begins to work as a maid in his house. However, not everyone will receive Rosa with equal enthusiasm. Amanda, José Manuel's mother, sees the poor girl as an opportunist who is only after the family's money, so in protest she leaves the house. Meanwhile, Mérida, the housekeeper, will be in charge of making life impossible for Rosa.

Although the worst is yet to come, as Maribel, who still suffers the loss of her daughter, reappears in José Manuel's life ready to win him back. Maribel will see in Rosa her main enemy, without suspecting that it is her own daughter.

== Cast ==
- Lourdes Munguía as Rosa Sánchez
- Gonzalo Vega as José Manuel Palacios
- Talina Fernández as Maribel Montesinos
- Beatriz Aguirre as Nena Martínez
- Manuel Saval as Chucho Landeros
- Ana Bertha Lepe as Ticha
- José Carlos Ruiz as Pascual Sánchez
- Bertha Moss as Amanda Montesinos
- Luis Aguilar as Gabriel Landeros
- Josefina Escobedo as Rutila
- Gastón Tuset as Germán
- Ada Carrasco as Lucha
- Martha Zamora as Bertha
- Silvia Caos as Mérida
- Mauricio Ferrari as Luccino
- Vittorina Garessi as Olga
- Rosa Carmina as Linda Rey
- Olivia Collins as Irene
- Toño Infante as Santos Vega
- Joana Brito as Brígida
- María Prado as Nicolasa
- Raúl Meraz as Don Felipe Montesinos
- Graciela Orozco as Gervasia
- Fernando Amaya as Jean Carlo
- Mercedes Pascual
