= Perdóname todo =

- Directed by: Raul Araiza
- Written by: Fernando Galiana; Raul Araiza; José José
- Starring: José José; Alejandra Ávalos; Sergio Jiménez
- Distributed by: Televisa
- Release date: 26 May 1995
- Running time: 113 minutes
- Country: Mexico
- Language: Spanish

Perdóname todo (English: Forgive Me Everything) is a 1995 Mexican drama film starring José José, Alejandra Ávalos and Sergio Jiménez.

== Plot ==
Ricardo Alfaro (José José) is a popular composer and singer who has failed in life because of alcohol. But things change when he meets Teresa Montes (Alejandra Ávalos), a young talented singer, that sings Ricardo's songs with a great public acceptance. Teresa became famous and Ricardo returns to the pinnacle of success, the hazy past seems to have been left behind. They fall in love, but both will face hell in Ricardo's alcoholism.

== Production notes ==
- The film was shot in Mexico City.
- Ricardo was supposed to die in the end of the movie, but José José decided to change the script.
- The idea for the movie was originated due to José José's alcoholism. He began filming after his rehab.
