= Morir dos veces =

Mexican telenovela

- Genre: Telenovela; Romance; Drama
- Created by: José Rendón
- Written by: Ximena Suárez; Alfonso Espinosa; Martha Carrillo
- Directed by: Alberto Cortés
- Starring: Carina Ricco; Eduardo Palomo; Manuel Landeta; Alejandra Ávalos; Susana Alexander; Irma Lozano; José Carlos Ruiz
- Theme music composer: Jorge Avendaño
- Opening theme: Morir dos veces by Manuel Mijares; Cuidarte el alma by Chayanne and "Forever" by Troy Banarzi (only in United States)
- Ending theme: Morir dos veces by Manuel Mijares
- Country of origin: Mexico
- Original language: Spanish
- No. of episodes: 55

Production
- Executive producer: José Rendón
- Producer: Roberto Hernández Vázquez
- Production locations: Filming; Televisa San Ángel; Mexico City, Mexico
- Cinematography: Jorge Miguel Valdés
- Running time: 41-44 minutes
- Production company: Televisa

Original release
- Network: Canal de las Estrellas
- Release: February 26 – May 10, 1996

Morir dos veces (English: Die Twice) is a Mexican telenovela produced by José Rendón for Televisa. It premiered on Canal de las Estrellas on February 26, 1996 and ended on May 10, 1996.

The telenovela stars Carina Ricco, Eduardo Palomo, Manuel Landeta and Alejandra Ávalos.

== Plot ==
Silvana is a housewife like any other, lives with her daughter Andrea and her husband Cristóbal, working together in a craft shop that Silvana got after his father died.

Cristóbal and Silvana passed through a bad phase, so they thought about divorcing but Silvana tries at all costs to save their marriage, unfortunately Silvana plans to keep his family vanish with the death of Cristóbal.

She does not understand how her husband so young, may have suffered from a heart attack. Cristóbal's body was still alive when Silvana finds him in his business and realizes that this has been ransacked.

After a while the mob began harassing the poor widow to collect five million dollars that her husband had stolen. Esteban Pizarro commander is in charge of the case and discover the links that Cristóbal had with the Mafia and drug trafficking.

Pizarro was suspected Silvana who actually killed Cristóbal to keep the money, making everyone believe he is innocent, so he tries to unmask approach her, but all he discovers is that is madly in love with her.

Even though everyone thinks that Cristóbal has died, the returns become an evil man willing to take revenge and destroy his wife and the commander Pizarro.

== Cast ==
- Carina Ricco as Silvana Ruiz
- Eduardo Palomo as Esteban Pizarro
- Manuel Landeta as Cristóbal Ruiz/Andrés Acosta
- Alejandra Ávalos as Martha Luján
- Susana Alexander as Beatriz
- Irma Lozano as Carmen
- José Carlos Ruiz as Orduña
- José Elías Moreno as Aarón Zermeño
- Javier Díaz Dueñas as Mauricio
- Malena Doria as Mayra "Cuca"
- Elizabeth Katz as Lucy
- Jaime Garza as Sergio Terán
- Octavio Galindo as Rubiano
- Vanessa Bauche as Carla
- Emely Faride as Yolanda
- Jaime Lozano as Isaías
- Luis Couturier as Enrique
- Constanza Mier as Andrea Ruiz
- Martha Ortiz as Gloria
- Mónika Sánchez as Minerva
- Ernesto Rivas as Nacho
- Carlos Rotzinger as Fernando Robles
- Fernando Sáenz as Víctor
- Enrique Singer as Julio Tafoya
- Jorge Victoria as Marcelino
- Jacqueline Robynson as Nancy
- María Dolores Oliva as La Chata
- Gonzalo Sánchez as Nicolás
- Susana González
- Rodrigo Abed
- Sabine Moussier as Paulette
- Jorge Capin
- Esteban Franco
- Ángeles Balvanera
- Francisco Chanes
- Carlos Gusih
- Rubén Morales
- Ileana Pereira
- Úrsula Muno
- Jaime Vega
- Ricardo Vera
