= Frontera (1980 film) =

1980 film by Fernando Durán Rojas

- Directed by: Fernando Durán Rojas
- Written by: Fabián Arnaud; Ramón Obón
- Produced by: Antonio H. Rodriguez
- Starring: Fernando Allende; Daniela Romo; Guillermo Capetillo
- Cinematography: Fernando Alvarez Garces
- Edited by: Ángel Camacho
- Music by: Nacho Mendez
- Distributed by: Televicine
- Release date: 15 May 1980 (Mexico)
- Running time: 95 minutes
- Country: Mexico
- Language: Spanish

Frontera (transl. Frontier) is a 1980 Mexican action thriller film directed by Fernando Durán Rojas and starring Fernando Allende, Daniela Romo, and Guillermo Capetillo.

== Plot ==
A young man wants to know the world and travels to the frontier between Mexico and the U.S. in search of his brother. Upon arrival, he realizes that his brother has died in an accident of bizarre characteristics. Anyway, he decides to stay and continues the business with his brother's girlfriend, together they will try to rebuild a restaurant with the help from family and friends. But everything is complicated when the mafia and drug dealers attack the project as it moves.

== Cast ==
- Fernando Allende as Fernando
- Daniela Romo as Rosy
- Guillermo Capetillo
- Gilberto Román
- Carlos Rivera
- Raymundo Bravo
- Carlos Riquelme
- Jorge Fegán
- Jorge Reynoso
- Mike Moroff
- Guillermo Lagunes
- Manuel Fregoso
- Manolo Cárdenas
- José Luis Avendaño
- José Wilhelmy

== Production ==
The film was shot in 1979.

== Release ==
The film was released on 15 May 1980. It was screened at the Cuautitlán Izcalli 2, Carrusel, Colonial, Dolores del Río, International, Marina, Olimpia, Soledad, Lago 1 and Elvira cinemas, for two weeks.
