= La antorcha encendida =

Television series

- Genre: Telenovela; Romance; Drama
- Created by: Fausto Zerón Medina
- Written by: Liliana Abud; Marcia Yance; José Manuel Villalpando; Tere Medina
- Directed by: Gonzalo Martínez Ortega; Claudio Reyes Rubio; Jesús Moreno
- Starring: Leticia Calderón; Humberto Zurita; Juan Ferrara; Julieta Rosen; Ari Telch; Juan Peláez; Ernesto Laguardia
- Theme music composer: Jorge Avendaño
- Opening theme: Obertura
- Ending theme: Pedro de Soto
- Country of origin: Mexico
- Original language: Spanish
- No. of episodes: 140

Production
- Executive producer: Ernesto Alonso
- Producer: Carlos Sotomayor
- Production locations: Filming; Televisa San Ángel; Mexico City, Mexico
- Cinematography: Jesús Acuña Lee; Carlos Guerra Villareal
- Running time: 21–22 minutes
- Production company: Televisa

Original release
- Network: Canal de las Estrellas
- Release: May 6 – November 15, 1996

La antorcha encendida (English: The Flaming Torch) is a Mexican telenovela produced by Ernesto Alonso and Carlos Sotomayor for Televisa in 1996. It was the last historical telenovela produced by Televisa. The plot tells the Independence of Mexico, with an emphasis on historical accuracy. It was written by Fausto Zeron Medina in collaboration with Liliana Abud. It premiered on Canal de las Estrellas on May 6, 1996, and ended on November 15, 1996.

Leticia Calderón and Humberto Zurita starred as protagonists, while Juan Ferrara, Julieta Rosen, Alejandra Ávalos and Ari Telch starred as antagonists. Luis Gatica, Christian Bach, Alejandro Ruiz, Julio Beckles, Ernesto Laguardia, Mario Iván Martínez, Sergio Reynoso and the leading actors Patricia Reyes Spíndola, María Rivas, Angélica María, Ofelia Guilmáin, Carmen Salinas, María Rojo, Juan Peláez, Germán Robles, Luis Gimeno, Enrique Rocha, Aarón Hernán, Sergio Jiménez and Lorenzo de Rodas starred as stellar performances.

== Plot ==
The story is set in New Spain after three centuries of Spanish rule, amid growing discontent over injustice, exploitation, poverty and inequality. Against this backdrop, the series follows the love story of Mariano and Teresa.

United not only by affection, but especially by the desire to see their land free, their paths follow the history of Mexico's independence and freedom. The show depicts the lives of three families, de Soto, de Muñiz and the widowed Juana de Foncerada and her five adopted children. Mariano Foncerada will face Don Pedro to defend Teresa de Muñiz, whom he loves, and Pedro seeks to destroy him, without suspecting that Mariano is his son.

== Cast ==
- Leticia Calderón as Teresa de Muñiz
- Humberto Zurita as Mariano Foncerrada
- Juan Ferrara as Don Pedro de Soto
- Julieta Rosen as Manuela de Soto
- Ari Telch as Luis Foncerrada
- Juan Peláez as Don Miguel Hidalgo y Costilla
- Ernesto Laguardia as Gral. Ignacio Allende
- Ofelia Guilmáin as Doña Macaria de Soto
- Aarón Hernán as Father Julián de Ibarne
- Angélica María as Doña Bernarda de Muñiz
- Sergio Reynoso as Don José María Morelos y Pavón
- María Rojo as Doña Josefa Ortiz de Domínguez
- Patricia Reyes Spíndola as Doña Juana de Foncerrada
- Carmen Salinas as Doña Camila de Foncerrada
- Enrique Rocha as Virrey Félix María Calleja
- René Casados as Agustín de Iturbide
- Jerardo as Santiago de Soto
- Sergio Sánchez as Don Jacinto de Muñiz
- Ramón Abascal as Mariano Jiménez
- Leonardo Daniel as Juan Aldama
- David Ostrosky as Mariano Abasolo
- Toño Mauri as Andrés Quintana Roo
- Juan Carlos Bonet as Nicolás Bravo
- Juan José Arjona as Francisco Xavier Mina
- Christian Bach as María Ignacia "Güera" Rodríguez
- Luis Gatica as Juan Foncerrada
- Alejandro Ruiz as Diego Foncerrada
- Julio Beckles as Lorenzo Foncerrada
- Sergio Jiménez as Matías de Heredia
- Alejandra Ávalos as Ángela
- Mario Iván Martínez as Ignacio López Rayón
- María Rivas as Virreina Inés de Jáuregui
- Sergio Bustamante as Virrey José de Iturrigaray
- Magda Karina as Brígida Almonte
- Luis Gimeno as Guillermo Aguirre y Viana
- Luis Xavier as Felipe Gómez Crespo
- Roxana Saucedo as Ana María Huarte
- Lorenzo de Rodas as Don Pablo de Irigoyen
- Isaura Espinoza as Micaela
- Roberto Ballesteros as Vicente Guerrero
- Óscar Bonfiglio as Guadalupe Victoria
- Julio Bracho as Simón Bolívar
- Raúl Buenfil as Mariano Matamoros
- Daniel Gauvry as Alexander Von Humboldt
- Armando Araiza as Martín García de Carrasquero
- Dacia Arcaráz as María Antonieta Morelos
- Odiseo Bichir as Fray Servando Teresa de Mier
- Luz María Jerez as Catalina de Irigoyen
- Gilberto Román as Miguel Domínguez
- Katia del Río as Leona Vicario
- Leticia Sabater as Joaquina Torreo de Esteve
- Maristel Molina as Doña Josefina Allué
- Nando Estevané as Manuel Hidalgo
- Claudio Sorel as Alcalde Ochoa
- Humberto Elizondo as Hermenegildo Galeana
- Sergio Klainer as Juan Ruiz de Apodaca
- Marco de Carlos as Juan O'Donojú
- Esteban Franco as El Pípila
- Javier Díaz Dueñas as Pedro Moreno
- Salvador Sánchez as Leonardo Bravo
- Jorge Santos as José María Hidalgo
- Humberto Dupeyrón as Mariano Hidalgo
- Ramón Menéndez as Manuel Abad y Queipo
- Alejandro Tommasi as José Nicolás de Michelena
- Germán Robles as Ángel Avella
- Antonio Medellín as "Amo" Torres
- Manolo García as Miguel de Bataller
- Roberto Blandón as Félix Flores Alatorre
- Manuel Saval as José Manuel Fuentes
- Natalia Esperón as Luz Agustina de las Fuentes
- Claudia Ferreira as Francisca de la Gándara
- Alberto Inzúa as Virrey Branciforte
- José Carlos Teruel as Bondpland
- Moisés Suárez as Arzobispo Lizana y Beausmont
- Martín Barraza as Lázaro
- Héctor Sáez as Juan Francisco Azcárate y Lezama
- Eduardo Liñán as Manuel de la Cancha
- Carlos Cámara as José Antonio Tirado
- Rafael Amador as Cabo Ortega
- Roberto D'Amico as Juan Antonio Riaño
- Juan Carlos Colombo as Fray Vicente de Santa María
- Andrés Bonfiglio as Gilberto Riaño
- Óscar Traven as Diego Berzábal
- Miguel Pizarro as José de la Cruz
- Isabel Benet as Ana de Soto
- Fernando Sáenz as José María Mercada
- Raúl Castellanos as Narciso Mendoza
- Alejandro Gaytán as Indalesio Allende
- Daniel Seres as Miguel Hidalgo (14 years old)
- Blanca Ireri as Manuela de Soto (child)
- Socorro Bonilla as Basilia
- Lucía Guilmáin as China Poblana
- Socorro Avelar as Chenta
- Mercedes Pascual as Pilar
- Aurora Clavel as Dominga
- Israel Jaitovich as Álvaro de Urzúa
- Leopoldo Frances as Dámaso
- Jean Douverger as Lorenzo
- Eduardo Santamarina as Héctor
- Fabián Robles as José
- Toño Infante

== Awards ==
Year	Award	Category	Nominee	Result
1997	15th TVyNovelas Awards	Best Telenovela of the Year	Ernesto Alonso	Nominated
1997	15th TVyNovelas Awards	Best Actress	Leticia Calderón	Nominated
1997	15th TVyNovelas Awards	Best Antagonist Actor	Juan Ferrara	Nominated
1997	15th TVyNovelas Awards	Best Supporting Actress	Angélica María	Nominated
1997	15th TVyNovelas Awards	Best Supporting Actor	Juan Peláez	Nominated
1997	15th TVyNovelas Awards	Best Direction of the Cameras	Jesús Acuña Lee; Carlos Guerra	Won
1997	15th TVyNovelas Awards	Best Production	Carlos Sotomayor	Won
1997	15th TVyNovelas Awards	Best Outstanding Performance	Juan Ferrara	Won
1997	15th TVyNovelas Awards	Best Outstanding Performance	Ernesto Laguardia	Won
1997	15th TVyNovelas Awards	Best Outstanding Performance	Juan Peláez	Won
1997	15th TVyNovelas Awards	Best Art Direction	Isabel Chazaro; Ricardo Matamoros; Miguel Ángel Medina	Won
1997	15th TVyNovelas Awards	Best Decor	Ricardo Brizuela	Won
1997	15th TVyNovelas Awards	Best Costume Design	Cristina Bauza; Beatrice Vázquez	Won
1997	15th TVyNovelas Awards	Best Editing	Marcelino Gómez; Roberto Nino	Won

== Soundtrack ==
Available in Mercado Libre and Amazon.

#	Title	Written by	Time
1.	"Instrumental (Obertura)"	Jorge Avéndaño	1:38
2.	"Sonata de Flauta y Cémbalo"	Jorge Avéndaño	2:38
3.	"El Padre Hidalgo"	Jorge Avéndaño	2:35
4.	"Los Criollos"	Jorge Avéndaño	1:49
5.	"Los Lamentos"	Jorge Avéndaño	3:19
6.	""Teresa y Mariano	Jorge Avéndaño	3:10
7.	"Pedro de Soto"	Jorge Avéndaño	1:25
8.	"Nocturno"	Jorge Avéndaño	3:48
9.	"Huapango Mestizo"	Jorge Avéndaño	1:34
10.	"Fugato de Cuerdas"	Jorge Avéndaño	0:39
11.	"Morelos (El Genio Militar)"	Jorge Avéndaño	2:56
12.	"Romance"	Jorge Avéndaño	0:33
13.	"El Son"	Jorge Avéndaño	1:31
14.	"Instrumental (Obertura) 2: La Campana de Dolores"	Jorge Avéndaño	2:08
15.	"Los Lamentos (Alternative version)"	Jorge Avéndaño	3:20
16.	"Las Batallas (Alternative version of Pedro de Soto)"	Jorge Avéndaño	1:58
17.	"Los Niños Muertos (La Alhóndiga)"	Jorge Avéndaño	1:34
18.	"Los Indígenas"	Jorge Avéndaño	2:10
19.	"Teresa y Mariano 2"	Jorge Avéndaño	0:33
20.	"Las Batallas 2 (Alternative version of Pedro de Soto)"	Jorge Avéndaño	2:27
21.	"Los Arrepentimientos"	Jorge Avéndaño	2:11
22.	"Solo Hidalgo"	Jorge Avéndaño	1:11
23.	"Los Fusilamientos"	Jorge Avéndaño	0:47
24.	"Lacrimosa"	Jorge Avéndaño	4:05
25.	"La Fiesta de los Esclavos Negros"	Jorge Avéndaño	2:01
26.	"Fugato"	Jorge Avéndaño	0:39
27.	"Los Arrepentimientos (Alternative version)"	Jorge Avéndaño	2:10
28.	"Romance"	Jorge Avéndaño	2:20
29.	"Los Lamentos"	Jorge Avéndaño	3:17
30.	"La Consumación de la Independencia (Guerrero, Bravo e Iturbide)"	Jorge Avéndaño	2:49
