= Eduardo Palomo =

Mexican actor

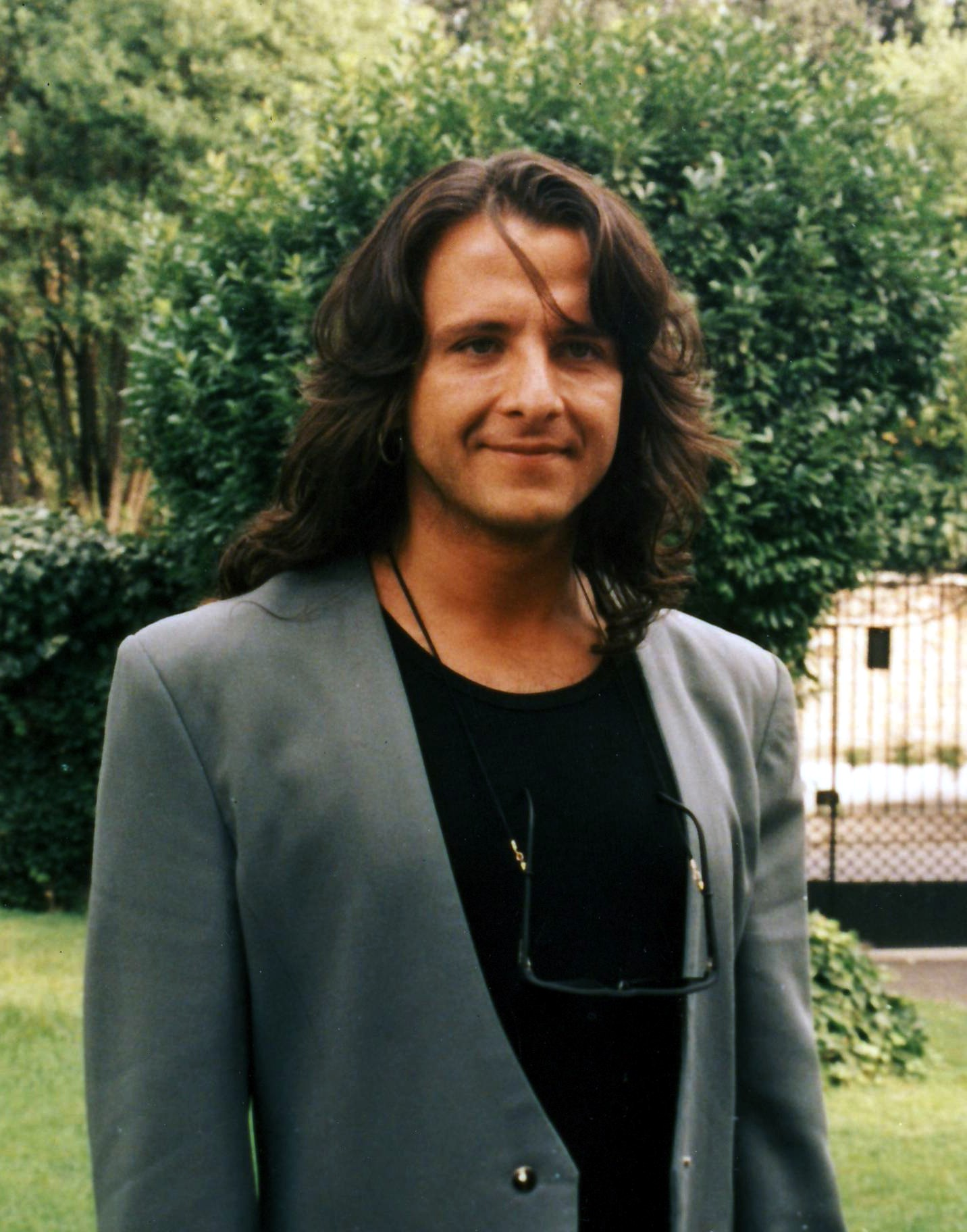
- Palomo in 1995
- Born: Eduardo Estrada Palomo; May 13, 1962; Mexico City, México
- Died: November 6, 2003 (aged 41); Los Angeles, California, U.S.
- Years active: 1974–2003
- Spouse: Carina Ricco (m. 1994)
- Children: 2, including Fiona

Eduardo Estrada Palomo (Spanish pronunciation: [eˈðwaɾðo paˈlomo]; (México City; May 13, 1962 – Los Angeles; November 6, 2003) was a Mexican actor. Palomo became famous across Mexico and Latin America after his 1993 Juan del Diablo characterization in Corazón salvaje.

== Career ==
He started acting in theatre at the age of 12 and found fame with the success of Corazón salvaje. He went on to make several other successful telenovelas and films in México. He also recorded an album titled Mover El Tiempo in early 1994.

In 1999 Palomo participated in the Latin American Spanish dub of the Walt Disney Pictures film Tarzan, voicing the lead role.

He was determined not to star in any other soap opera after Ramona (co-starring with Kate del Castillo), but the sequel to Corazón salvaje was something he could not refuse. He was working on a Los Angeles production of the play Una Pareja Con Ángel (written by Palomo and previously produced in Mexico) when he died.

Palomo was in the process of "crossing-over" to American television audiences where he guest starred on shows such as Arrested Development, Kingpin and was to star in a CBS series. His last role was in A Day Without a Mexican (2004).

== Personal life ==
Palomo was one of Jesús Estrada and Miliza Palomo's sons. His siblings were brother Jesús Jr. and sister Susana.

Palomo attended the National Autonomous University of Mexico to study graphic design, but dropped out to pursue acting. He moved from his native México to pursue a career in Hollywood.

Palomo was married to the singer and actress Carina Ricco and had two children. He was a Scientologist.

== Death ==
On the night of November 6, 2003, Palomo was having dinner with friends at a restaurant in Los Angeles when he suffered a heart attack. He reportedly grasped his chest and collapsed, and was rushed to Cedars-Sinai Medical Center, but could not be revived. He was 41 years old.

== Filmography ==
=== Film ===
Year	Title	Role	Notes
1982	Sin privilegios		
1985	El destructor		
1989	Derrumbe	Fabián Cruz	
1990	Samuel		Short film
1991	Rojo Amanecer	Injured Boy	
1991	La mujer de Benjamín	Leandro	
1991	El extensionista	Cruz López, El Extensionista	
1991	Bandidos		
1992	Getrudis	Esteban Díaz	
1992	Mi querido Tom Mix	Tom Mix	
1992	Serpientes y escaleras		
1993	Las mil y una aventuras del metro		
1999	Tarzan	Tarzan	Voice role (Latin Spanish dub)
2000	Crónica de un desayuno	Juan	
2002	Cojones	Mexican neighbor	Short film
2003	El misterio del Trinidad	Juan Aguirre	
2004	A Day Without a Mexican	Roberto Quintana	

=== Television ===
Year	Title	Role	Notes
1981-1982	Por amor		
1982	Lo que el cielo no perdona		
1982	No empujen		
1982-1983	Mañana es primavera	Fernando	
1983	Videocosmos		
1984	Eclipse	Fernando	
1985	Juana Iris		
1985-1986	El ángel caído	Antonio "Toño" Arvide Quijano	
1986	Cautiva	Enrique	
1986-1987	Lista negra	Hugo Lauri	
1987	Tal como somos	Octavio	
1989	La casa al final de la calle	Claudio Juárez	
1989	La hora marcada	Eddie / León	
1990	Fugitivos del diablo		Television film
1990	Yo compro esa mujer	Federico	
1990	La fuerza del amor	Gilberto	
1991	La pícara soñadora	Alfredo Rochild/Carlos Pérez	
1991	Alcanzar una estrella II	Gabriel Loredo Muriel	
1992	Triángulo	Iván	
1993-1994	Corazón salvaje	Juan del Diablo / Francisco Alcázar	
1996	Morir dos veces	Esteban	
1997-1998	Huracán	Ulises	
2000	Ramona	Alejandro de Asís	
2003	Kingpin	Capt. Lazareno	
2003	Arrested Development	Everado	Episode "Everado – Key Decisions"

== Discography ==
- 1994: Mover el tiempo
