= Siempre te amaré =

Mexican telenovela

- Genre: Telenovela; Romance; Drama
- Created by: Caridad Bravo Adams; Fernanda Villeli
- Written by: Consuelo Garrido; Georgina Tinoco; Alberto Aridjis; Juan Carlos Tejeda; Rosita Bouchot; Álvaro Cueva; Isabel Soriano
- Directed by: Patricia Reyes Spíndola; Roberto D'Amico; Alberto Rojas; Xavier Marc; Julián Pastor
- Starring: Laura Flores; Fernando Carrillo; Arturo Peniche; Alejandra Ávalos; Gerardo Murguia
- Opening theme: Sigue sin mi by Marco Antonio Solís
- Ending theme: Perdóname by Fernando Carrillo
- Country of origin: Mexico
- Original language: Spanish
- No. of episodes: 135

Production
- Executive producer: Juan Osorio
- Producer: Ramón Ortiz Quiñónez
- Production locations: Filming; Televisa San Ángel; Mexico City, Mexico
- Cinematography: Enrique García; Alejandro Álvarez Ceniceros
- Editor: Ricardo Rodriguez
- Camera setup: Multi-camera
- Running time: 41-44 minutes
- Production company: Televisa

Original release
- Network: Canal de las Estrellas
- Release: January 24 – July 28, 2000

Related
- Lo imperdonable (1975–1976); Lo imperdonable (2015)

Siempre te amaré (English: I Will Always Love You) is a Mexican telenovela produced by Juan Osorio for Televisa that premiered on Canal de Las Estrellas on January 24, 2000, and ended on July 28, 2000. It was adapted from the 1975 telenovela Lo imperdonable (The Unforgivable) by Consuelo Garrido and Georgina Tinoco.

Laura Flores, Fernando Carrillo and Arturo Peniche (replacement of Carrillo) starred as protagonists, while Alejandra Ávalos starred as main antagonist.

== Plot ==
Victoria Robles and Mauricio Castellanos are a married couple who live happily together, though with certain tensions because Mauricio is extremely jealous of his wife. Moreover, Doña Úrsula Grajales, widow of Castellanos and Mauricio's mother, strongly disapproves of Victoria as her daughter-in-law (she tolerates her grudgingly) and prefers Gilda, one of Mauricio's former lovers, whom she loves like a daughter. Additionally, Gilda and Victoria have never gotten along since their university days. Meanwhile, Martín Mendízabal, a friend of Mauricio, has always envied Mauricio's success and is also in love with Victoria.

The couple has two children, Eduardo and Antonia, whom they love dearly. However, fate would play them a cruel trick when they receive a visit from the painter Julio Granados, with whom Sabina (Mauricio's sister) falls in love. Julio convinces her to run away with him on a train, but she changes her mind at the last moment. Victoria, who went to the platform looking for Sabina, accidentally boards the train, which departs with her and Granados on it. Because of this, Mauricio and Ariana believe that Victoria and Julio Granados are lovers and have eloped together. That night, a severe storm occurs, and the train is struck by lightning, derailing and killing several passengers, including Granados. However, some survive, including Victoria.

When Mauricio learns about the train accident, he is devastated, believing Victoria to be dead, and delivers the tragic news to their children. Meanwhile, Victoria, lost and disoriented, falls into the hands of a madman named Rex, who mistakes her for his dead wife and holds her captive in his hideout. After managing to escape, she returns to the Castellanos household, only to be mistreated by Doña Úrsula, who tells her that to the entire family, she is dead. Heartbroken, Victoria wanders the streets until she is found by a young woman named Rossana, who consoles her and takes her to Román Castillo, a successful theater entrepreneur. Román introduces Victoria to the artistic world, transforming her into a distinguished theater actress under the pseudonym Amparo Rivas.

Ten years pass, and Mauricio is now married to Gilda. Eduardo and Antonia, now young adults, have achieved success in their respective fields. Eduardo works at the Castellanos law firm, while Antonia pursues a career as a photographer. Antonia fondly remembers her mother and misses her deeply, but Eduardo, influenced by his father, resents his mother, firmly believing she betrayed the family. When "Amparo Rivas" returns to Mexico for a series of theatrical performances, she encounters her two children in various circumstances, prompting her to continue her quest to reconnect with them and repair her tarnished image.

Antonia becomes Amparo's personal photographer and forms a close friendship with the actress, unaware that she is her mother. This angers Eduardo, Gilda, and Doña Úrsula. The latter two discover that Amparo is actually Victoria and begin plotting schemes to drive her out of their lives once more.

Gilda, despite appearing to be a refined and respectable woman, is a dangerous psychopath capable of committing heinous acts in order to get what she wants. To do so, disguised as a man, she tries to kill Victoria on two occasions, although without success. She also cruelly murdered Nayeli De la Parra, Antonia's best friend, because she discovered Amparo's maternal bond with Antonia and Eduardo by reading her grandmother Constanza's diary, and Fausto, the son of an ex-lover of hers who knew about her crimes and was blackmailing her. The panorama begins to clear up and both Antonia and Eduardo finally learn the truth about their mother and return to her and after an attempt, manage to reconcile their parents. By that time, everyone realizes the kind of woman Gilda is and manages to put her in jail.

Happiness has returned to the Castellanos household. Victoria and Mauricio go on their honeymoon, and during that time, they find out that Gilda died in prison. But a couple of weeks later, they also find out that Jonás, the doctor at the women's prison, has been found dead in the bathtub of his house, not knowing that he was murdered by Gilda. On the pleasure trip they took, Mauricio introduces Victoria to an old childhood friend of his: Luis Miguel, with whom they get along quickly. Gilda, who had faked her death and adopted a new personality, Martha Laura Izaguirre, goes in search of the couple, who had gone sailing to Altamar, catches Mauricio and kills him. Victoria is completely destroyed and Luis Miguel takes care of her.

It is under these circumstances that a powerful and evil man named Octavio Elizondo appears in the life of the Castellanos family. After seeing Victoria in a theater performance, he becomes totally obsessed with her and wants to make her his wife. Thus, he becomes friends with Eduardo and manages to set traps for him to lead the Castellanos law firm to ruin. Luis Miguel confronts him so that Victoria can see who Octavio Elizondo really is, but she, looking out for the well-being of her family first, decides to marry Elizondo.

Misfortune falls upon the Castellanos once again, as the family home, through a ruse plotted by Gilda and Octavio, ends up in flames and Martín Mendizábal, who had survived an assassination attempt by Gilda, spent all his time watching her every step and murder after she had escaped from prison by faking her name and changing her identity, but Gilda discovered him soon after, later, Martín reveals to Victoria, Francisco and Sabina everything he knew about Gilda and the fact that she is alive to prevent them and finally turns out to be murdered by Gilda in his apartment. Luis Miguel finally discovers that Martha Laura, is Gilda: the cause of Victoria and her family's misfortunes.

During Victoria and Octavio's honeymoon, Victoria finds out what kind of person Octavio is, but he has her kidnapped by means of threats. Luis Miguel, seeing the danger Victoria is in, manages to catch up with her along with Olmos, resulting in a fight between Luis Miguel and Octavio, while Olmos manages to take Victoria to safety.

In response, Gilda manages to set a trap for Victoria on the outskirts of the city; she kills Olmos and kidnaps her. Luis Miguel manages to hand Octavio over to the police, but later finds out that Gilda killed Olmos. So he and several police officers go to rescue Victoria and arrive at a cemetery, where Victoria was hiding to escape from Gilda.

The latter, seeing that the police have arrived, decides to enter the cemetery chapel where a wake was being held. Seeing herself cornered, she hides inside the coffin in order to escape. Meanwhile, Luis Miguel rescues Victoria and takes her back to his house. As the people begin to move toward the grave, Gilda meets her end as the casket is locked and buried three meters underground. Desperate, she cries and screams inside the coffin, trying to escape but failing. This is how she meets her demise, paying for her evil deeds in full, haunted by the memories of all her victims.

Peace reigns once again over everyone. Eduardo and Antonia are happy with their partners (Berenice and Leonardo, respectively). Doña Úrsula, repentant, asks Victoria for forgiveness for the way she always treated her, and she begins a wonderful relationship with Luis Miguel, thus proving that there is no evil that lasts a hundred years, and that happiness always comes.

== Cast ==
- Laura Flores as Victoria Robles de Castellanos/Amparo Rivas
- Fernando Carrillo as Mauricio Castellanos Grajales
- Arturo Peniche as Luis Miguel Garay
- Alejandra Ávalos as Gilda Gómez de Castellanos/Martha Laura Izaguirre
- Gerardo Murguía as Román Castillo Arteaga
- Guillermo García Cantú as Jorge Montesinos
- Alejandro Tommasi as Octavio Elizondo
- Ofelia Guilmáin as Doña Úrsula Grajales Vda. de Castellanos
- María Victoria as Columba Enriqueta Pardo de Serrano
- Gabriela Goldsmith as Ariadna de Granados/Ariadna de Mendizábal
- Rodrigo Vidal as Eduardo Castellanos Robles
- Rafael Rojas as Patricio Mistral
- Renée Varsi as Antonia Castellanos Robles de Reyes
- Vanessa Guzmán as Sabina Castellanos Grajales
- Mónica Dossetti as Rossana Banderas
- Mayrín Villanueva as Berenice Gutiérrez
- Claudia Silva as Lucía
- Alfonso Iturralde as Father Pablo
- Abraham Ramos as Leonardo Reyes Pastor
- Luis Xavier as Francisco Reyes
- Alejandra Procuna as Olivia Salas Berriozábal
- Luz Elena González as Mara
- José Roberto as Abelardo Roldán
- Rosángela Balbó as Constanza de la Parra
- Amparo Garrido as Soledad de Estrada
- Gabriel Varela as Martín Mendizábal
- Oscar Uriel as Tizoc Pardo
- Benjamín Rivero as Virgilio Jobito "El Verrugas"
- Arturo Vázquez as Alberto Estrada
- Miguel Herrer as El Piojo
- Manuel "El Loco" Valdés as Francisco "Pancho" Sánchez
- Frances Ondiviela as Violeta Arizmendi de Garay
- Chao as Julio Granados
- Wendy González as Jazmín Elizondo Silva
- Evita Muñoz "Chachita" as Estrella "Estrellita" Vda. de Silva
- Luis Fernando Torres as Luisito
- Germán Gutiérrez as Fausto Berriozábal
- Ricardo Alejandro Valdés as José "Pepe" Sánchez
- Roberto Marín as Palillo
- Benito Castro as Dr.Jonás Pérez
- Diana Osorio as Mariana Garay Arismendi
- Luis Roberto Guzmán as Alfredo Dominguez
- Adriana Riveramelo as Nayeli de la Parra
- Eugenio Lobo as Adán
- Marco Mũnoz as Hernan
- Ivonne Montero as Mercedes "Meche" González
- Nancy Pablos as Lorenza
- Miguel Priego as Detective Olmos
- Ivonne Bardett as Bonnie
- Alfredo Vega as Cirilo
- Leslie Giovanna as Blanquita
- José Eduardo as Eduardo Castellanos (child)
- Eduardo Rodríguez as Raúl Acosta
- Ernesto Valenzuela as Antonio "Toño" Quintana
- Ana Hally as Rita
- Natasha Dupeyrón as Antonia Castellanos (child)
- Carlos Cámara as Lic. Sandoval
- Kenia Hurtado as Veronica Landeros (child)
