= La sombra del otro (1996 TV series) =

- Genre: Telenovela; Romance; Drama
- Created by: Carlos Olmos
- Written by: Julián Robles
- Directed by: Benjamín Cann
- Starring: Edith González; Rafael Rojas; Alejandro Camacho; Adriana Laffan; Carlos Bracho; Lilia Aragón; Blanca Sánchez
- Theme music composer: Memo Méndez Guiu
- Opening theme: La Sombra Del Otro
- Country of origin: Mexico
- Original language: Spanish
- No. of episodes: 120 (of 21-22 minutes); 60 (of 41-44 minutes)

Production
- Executive producer: Julissa
- Producer: Giselle González Salgado
- Production locations: Filming; Televisa San Ángel; Mexico City, Mexico; Locations; Mexico City, Mexico; San Miguel de Allende, Mexico; Mazatlán, Mexico
- Running time: 41-44 minutes
- Production company: Televisa

Original release
- Network: Canal de las Estrellas
- Release: May 27 – August 16, 1996

Related
- Shadow (1996)

La sombra del otro (English: Other's Shadow) is a Mexican telenovela produced by Julissa and Giselle González Salgado for Televisa. It premiered on Canal de las Estrellas on May 27, 1996 and ended on Friday, August 16, 1996.

Edith González and Rafael Rojas starred as protagonists, while Alejandro Camacho starred as main antagonist.

== Plot ==
Pressured by her father, Don Clemente, Lorna Madrigal gets engaged to Iván Lavarta, a renowned psychologist who agrees to the engagement only by gratitude, because when they were children, he saved her from a fire that, unfortunately, killed Lorna's mother, Bernardina del Castillo. Despite the moral engagement, on their wedding day, Lorna decides not to marry Iván.

== Cast ==
- Edith González as Lorna Madrigal del Castillo
- Rafael Rojas as Manuel de la Riva/Marcos Beltrán
- Alejandro Camacho as Dr. Iván Lavarta Morales
- Adriana Laffan as Betsy Corcuera de de la Riva
- Carlos Bracho as Don Clemente Madrigal
- Lilia Aragón as Marina Morales
- Blanca Sánchez as Dora "Dorita" Villavicencio Vda. de Rojas/de Madrigal
- Pedro Armendáriz, Jr. as Comandante Luis Tello
- José Suárez as Alberto Rojas Villavicencio
- Dacia González as Camila Corcuera
- Luis Couturier as Pierre Tavernier
- Marta Aura as Julieta Tavernier
- Jorge Antolín as Julián de la Riva
- Odiseo Bichir as Dr. Germán Pineda
- Manuel Gurría as Fermín Luján
- Andrea Legarreta as María Elena "Malena" Gutiérrez
- Amairani as Cora Meléndez
- Patricio Castillo as Ludwig Brailovsky
- Carmelita González as Coco de la Riva
- Dolores Beristáin as Concepción "Conchita" de la Riva
- Gustavo Negrete as César Corcuera
- Adriana Larrañaga as Sonia Escudero
- Martha Escobar as Olga Palmerín
- Rafael del Villar as Marcos Beltrán
- Susana Zabaleta as Lic. Angelina Amaral
- Mario del Río as Andrés
- Héctor Ortega as Dr. Frank Gluck
- Evangelina Sosa as Maley
- Yasser Beltrán as Yasser Labrath "El Arabito"
- Joana Brito as Consuelo
- Mariana Brito as Naty Vidal
- Manuela Imaz as Lorna Madrigal (child)
- Alan Gutiérrez as Iván Lavarta (child)
- Eugenia Leñero as Susy
- Luis Rábago as Pancho
- Rebeca Mankita as Cristal
- Maya Mishalska as Bernardina del Castillo de Madrigal
- Tere Mondragón as Marga
- Beatriz Monroy as Chayito
- Juan Felipe Preciado as Platón
- Verónica Langer as Fátima
- Baltazar Oviedo as Albañil
- Josefo Rodríguez as Dr. Juan Durán
- Raúl Valerio as Tiburcio
- Alejandro Ávila as Benito
- Alicia del Lago as Employee of Tavernier
- Fernando Robles as Mario Zamora
- Adrián Taboada as Father Palazuelos
- Jorge Munguía as Santiago
- Martha Navarro
- Raquel Pankowsky
- Renée Varsi
- Ricardo Lezama
- Elena Vela
- Benito Perculis
- Ramón Ramos Arizde

== Awards ==
Year	Award	Category	Nominee	Result
1997	15th TVyNovelas Awards	Best Actor	Rafael Rojas	Nominated
1997	15th TVyNovelas Awards	Best Antagonist Actor	Alejandro Camacho	Nominated
1997	15th TVyNovelas Awards	Best Leading Actor	Carlos Bracho	Nominated
1997	15th TVyNovelas Awards	Best Supporting Actress	Andrea Legarreta	Nominated
