= Carina Ricco =

Mexican musician (born 1968)

- Born: November 27, 1967 (age 58); Veracruz, México
- Occupation: Actress
- Spouse: Eduardo Palomo (m. 1994; died 2003)
- Children: 2, including Fiona

Carina Ricco (born November 27, 1968, Veracruz, Mexico) is a Mexican actress, singer, musician, producer, and composer. In 2007 she opened her own music record company. She is the widow of Eduardo Palomo, father of her two children, Fiona and Luca.

== Biography ==
Born in the port city of Veracruz, Mexico of Spanish and Italian origin, Ricco spent her childhood in Argentina, where she began exploring the world of music as a very young child. She started her professional musical career, in earnest, once back in Mexico as a teenager.

In 1987, she won the "La Figura del Año" ('The Model of the Year') award, which allowed her to work as a professional model. Second place in the contest was taken by actress Cynthia Klitbo, and third place was taken by actress Angélica Rivera (First Lady of Mexico from 2012 to 2018).

In 1993, Ricco released her first solo album, Del Cabello a los Pies (Head to Toe), and toured Central and South America. She is most proud of her performances at the Viña del Mar Festival, where she was her country’s representative.

In 1997, she released Sueños Urbanos (Urban Dreams), the album in which we discover more about Ricco as a songwriter. Her single Solo Quiero reached the pinnacle of popularity.

Despite interest from major record labels Ricco chose to start her own record company, Damselfly Records. In 2007 she released her third album Viaje Personal.

Ricco is a singer, musician and composer who has also explored film, theatre and television, both as an actress and as a producer.
