= Talina Fernández =

Mexican actress and television presenter (1944–2023)

- Born: Catalina María del Sagrado Corazón Fernández-Veró Vela; 2 August 1944; Mexico City, Mexico
- Died: 28 June 2023 (aged 78); Mexico City, Mexico
- Other name: La dama del buen decir
- Education: National Institute of Cardiology
- Occupations: Television presenter, journalist, producer, actress
- Years active: 1970–2023
- Employer: Televisa
- Spouses: Gerardo Levy (divorced); Alejandro Carrillo Castro (m. 1981–2015; divorced)
- Children: Mariana Levy (1966–2005); Coco Levy; Patricio Levy (1971–2024)

Catalina María del Sagrado Corazón Fernández-Veró Vela (2 August 1944 – 28 June 2023) was a Mexican television presenter, journalist, producer, and actress. She hosted and wrote for numerous television programs for many years.

== Biography ==
Talina Fernández was born in Mexico City in 1944, the daughter of Jorge Fernández-Veró and Catalina Vela Alcaraz. She went to study in the United States at a very young age. After returning to Mexico, she graduated in nursing from the National Institute of Cardiology.

Fernández married Gerardo Levy, with whom she had three children, among them the entertainer Mariana Levy, who died from cardiac arrest in 2005.

After her separation from Levy, she married politician Alejandro Carrillo Castro in 1981. They divorced in 2015, after Fernández alleged infidelity on his part.

Fernández died at a hospital in Polanco, Mexico City on 28 June 2023, 4 and a half weeks short of her 79th birthday, after a short battle with leukemia.

== Career ==
In 1972, she began her career as an actress, with a special appearance on the telenovela Las gemelas. In 1977, she was a guest star on another telenovela, Caras y gestos. She participated in two other telenovelas – Muchachita in 1985 (as a co-star) and Tenías que ser tú in 1992.

Fernández was the host of various specials, such as the Academy Awards, beauty pageants, and sports programs.

Fernández produced several television programs, including Vi, video y vencí (1988) and Gana video (1989). She also produced the TV movie Buscando a la niña Heidi in 1988.

Throughout her career, she hosted several programs, including Nuestras realidades, Rim Bom Video, Taliníssima, ¿Qué crees?, Nuestra Casa, Hasta en las mejores familias, and Hoy.

Fernández was a presenter of the Teletón broadcasts in 1997, 2000, 2001, and 2002. She participated in and contributed to other programs such as Bailando por la boda de tus sueños in 2006, Big Brother VIP: Mexico in 2004, 100 mexicanos dijeron in 2005, and the 2007 Premios TVyNovelas.

In 2003, she headed Nuestra casa with Jorge "Coque" Muñiz, her daughter Mariana Levy, Claudia Lizaldi, and Carmen Muñoz. She participated in several documentaries, including No contaban con mi astucia (2000), Historias engarzadas: Sonia Infante (2006), and one in honor of her daughter, Un recuerdo para Mariana Levy (2006).

That same year, a meningeal tumor was detected in her head, which was successfully removed via surgery. In 2009, she had a supporting role in the series Adictos, where she played Lulú.

From 2016, she appeared on Hoy, in the segment "Te voy a contar una historia" (I am going to tell you a story). In February 2017 she stated that a new, inoperable tumor had been detected in her head.

Fernández was involved in several public disputes with Ariel López Padilla and José María "El Pirru" Fernández, both ex-husbands of her deceased daughter.
