= Sergio Jiménez =

Mexican actor

Sergio Jiménez (December 17, 1937 – January 3, 2007), born in Mexico City, was a Mexican actor. He became famous after portraying the character of El Gato in the film Los caifanes. His last work was directing the telenovela La fea más bella. Sergio also worked in his "actor's studio" which he operated with the actress Adriana Barraza (nominated for an Oscar as Best Supporting Actress for Babel). He is known in the Mexican community as "El Profe" (the teacher).

== Some films ==
- Los caifanes
- El Profe
- Mexicano tú puedes
- El jinete de la divina providencia
- El extensionista
- La generala
- Las visitaciones del diablo
- Pelo suelto
- Perdóname Todo
- Hijo de puta
- La Faccia violenta di New York Sergio 1975
- Shriek of terror
- The flying pony
- The Hex
- Angel del barrio
- La pachanga
- Rattlesnake
- Coronation
- The black widow
- One way
- En la trampa
- The devil's visitation
- Mundo mágico
- Acorralado
- Toña machetes
- Constelaciones
- Direct trip to hell

== Telenovela ==
- Valentina
- Baila conmigo
- La antorcha encendida
- Senda de gloria
- El maleficio
- El derecho de nacer
- Encadenados(1988)

== Sources ==
- El Universal
