= Tenías que ser tú (1992 TV series) =

- Genre: Telenovela
- Created by: Jorge Patiño
- Written by: Jorge Patiño; Gerardo Sánchez Luna
- Directed by: Manolo García; Karina Duprez
- Starring: Alejandra Ávalos; Chao; Mariana Garza; Otto Sirgo; Saúl Lisazo; Talina Fernández; Rosita Arenas
- Opening theme: Tenías que ser tú by Alejandra Ávalos
- Country of origin: Mexico
- Original language: Spanish
- No. of episodes: 80

Production
- Executive producer: Carlos Téllez
- Producer: Lucero Suárez
- Cinematography: Carlos Sánchez Zuñiga; Miguel Ángel Barajas
- Running time: 41-44 minutes
- Production company: Televisa

Original release
- Network: Canal de las Estrellas
- Release: November 23, 1992 – March 12, 1993

Tenías que ser tú (English title: Had to be you) is a Mexican telenovela produced by Carlos Téllez for Televisa in 1993.

Alejandra Ávalos and Chao starred as protagonists, while Mariana Garza, Héctor Cruz Lara, Luis Couturier and the leading actor Carlos Monden starred as antagonists.

== Plot ==
Oswaldo Beltran, a father, died tragically in a car accident, leaving his family (his widow, Dolores, his eldest daughter, Gabriela, and his youngest son, Vado) at the mercy of poverty and hunger. Over time, the three manage to get along without many amenities.

== Cast ==
- Alejandra Ávalos as Gabrielita Beltrán
- Chao as Gorka Sarachaga
- Mariana Garza as Santa Robles
- Otto Sirgo as Tasio Sarachaga
- Saúl Lisazo as Alejandro Reyes
- Talina Fernández as Mariana de Sarachaga
- Rosita Arenas as Laura Alcaine
- Macaria as Dolores de Beltrán
- Miguel Ángel Ferriz as Adán Mejía
- Humberto Dupeyrón as Jorge Vega
- Carlos Monden as Lorenzo Bermúdez
- Héctor Cruz Lara as Gonzalo "Chalo" Escobar
- Gustavo Navarro as Pepe Ramírez
- Daniela Leites as Irma Alcaide
- Marisol Mijares as Ximena Sarachaga
- Zully Keith as Dora Ramírez
- Imperio Vargas as Bertha
- Luis Couturier as Antonio Olvera
- Alpha Acosta as Roxana
- Jaime Puga as Comandante
- María Clara Zurita as Chata
- Justo Martínez as Gilberto Escobar
- Alejandro Gaytán as Osvaldo "Vado" Beltrán
- María Rebeca as Hilda
- Martha Navarro as Elena de Robles
- Tito Reséndiz as Mario Robles
- Ricardo Lezama as Don Mike
- Humberto Leyva as El Sonrisas
- Paola Ochoa as Rebeca
- Alejandro Mayén as Dr. Ricardo
- Gonzalo Vega as Oswaldo Beltrán
- Rosario Gálvez
- Verónica Terán
- Edith Kleiman
- Jorge Pais
- Monserrat Ontiveros
- Alejandra Gollas
- Alan Gutiérrez
- Ginny Hoffman
- Juan Felipe Preciado
- Álvaro Carcaño Jr.
- Lucía Paillés
- Rodrigo Zurita
- Sergio Acosta
- Moisés Juan
- Óscar Servin
- Maleni Morales
- Antonio Brillas
- Guillermo Sauceda
- Alejandro Calderón
- Carlos Canto
- Juan de la Loza
- Óscar Narváez
- Luis Cárdenas
- Miguel Gómez Checa
- Hernán Mendoza
- Eva Calvo
- Francisco Casasola
- Ricardo Leal
- Arturo Lapman
- Horacio Vera
