= Juan Osorio =

Mexican telenovela producer (born 1957)

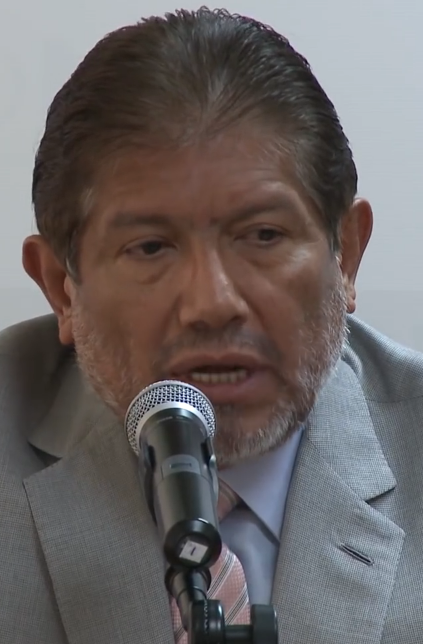
- Osorio at a press conference in 2017
- Born: Juan Manuel Osorio Ortiz; June 24, 1957 (age 68); Toluca de Lerdo, Mexico
- Occupation: Producer
- Years active: 1978–present
- Spouse: Niurka Marcos (m. 1998; div. 2003)
- Children: 4, including Emilio

Juan Manuel Osorio Ortiz (born June 24, 1957, in Toluca de Lerdo, Mexico) is a Mexican telenovela producer.

== Filmography ==
Telenovelas
Year	Title	Role
1986	La gloria y el infierno	Executive producer
1986	El padre Gallo	Executive producer
1987–1988	Tal como somos	Executive producer
1989	La casa al final de la calle	Executive producer
1989	Mi segunda madre	Executive producer
1990	Días sin luna	Executive producer
1991	Madres egoístas	Executive producer
1993	Clarisa	Executive producer
1995	María José	Executive producer
1995	Si Dios me quita la vida	Executive producer
1996	Marisol	Executive producer
1996	Para toda la vida	Executive producer
1997	El alma no tiene color	Executive producer
1998	Vivo Por Elena	Executive producer
1999	Nunca te olvidaré	Executive producer
2000	Siempre te amaré	Executive producer
2001–2002	Salomé	Executive producer
2003–2004	Velo de novia	Executive producer
2006	Duelo de Pasiones	Executive producer
2007–2008	Tormenta en el paraíso	Executive producer
2009	Mi Pecado	Executive producer
2011–2012	Una familia con suerte	Executive producer
2012–2013	Porque el amor manda	Executive producer
2014–2015	Mi corazón es tuyo	Executive producer
2016	Sueño de amor	Executive producer
2017–2019	Mi marido tiene familia	Executive producer
2019	El corazón nunca se equivoca	Executive producer
2019–2020	Soltero con hijas	Executive producer
2021	¿Qué le pasa a mi familia?	Executive producer
2022	El último rey	Executive producer
2022	La herencia	Executive producer
2023	El amor invencible	Executive producer
2024	El amor no tiene receta	Executive producer
2025	Amanecer	Executive producer
2026	Guardián de mi vida	Executive producer

== Theater ==
- Aristemo el Musical (2019)
- Aventurera (2017)
- Mi corazón es tuyo (2015)

== Awards and nominations ==
=== Premios TVyNovelas ===
Year	Category	Telenovela	Result
1990	Best Production	La casa al final de la calle	Won
1990	Best Telenovela of the Year	Mi segunda madre	Won
1991	Best Telenovela of the Year	Días sin luna	Nominated
2000	Best Telenovela of the Year	Nunca Te Olvidaré	Nominated
2002	Best Telenovela of the Year	Salomé	Nominated
2010	Best Telenovela of the Year	Mi Pecado	Nominated
2012	Best Telenovela of the Year	Una familia con suerte	Nominated
2014	Best Telenovela of the Year	Porque el Amor Manda	Nominated
2015	Best Telenovela of the Year	Mi Corazón es Tuyo	Won
2018	Best Telenovela of the Year	Mi Marido Tiene Famillia	Nominated

=== Premios People en Español ===
Year	Category	Telenovela	Result
2012	Telenovela of the Year	Una familia con suerte	Nominated
2013	Telenovela of the Year	Porque el Amor Manda	Won

=== TV Adicto Golden Awards ===
Year	Category	Telenovela	Result
2011	Best Telenovela of Televisa	Una familia con suerte	Won
2011	Best Telenovela of Court Popular	Una familia con suerte	Won
