= Martín Garatuza (TV series) =

1986 Mexican telenovela

- Genre: Telenovela; Drama
- Created by: Vicente Riva Palacio
- Written by: J.M. Rubio
- Directed by: José Caballero; Federico Weingartshofer
- Starring: Manuel Landeta; Mariana Levy; Eduardo Capetillo; Julieta Egurrola; Claudio Báez; Alonso Echánove
- Theme music composer: Ernesto Martínez; Walterio Pesqueira
- Opening theme: Instrumental
- Country of origin: Mexico
- Original language: Spanish
- No. of episodes: 90

Production
- Executive producers: Fernando Morett; Rosy Ocampo
- Production company: Televisa

Original release
- Network: Canal de las Estrellas
- Release: 17 June – 31 October 1986

Related
- Muchachita; El padre Gallo

Martín Garatuza is a Mexican telenovela produced by Fernando Moret and Rosy Ocampo for Televisa in 1986. The plot is based on the life of Martín Garatuza, a Mexican trickster of the 17th century.

Manuel Landeta and Cecilia Toussaint starred as protagonists, Eduardo Capetillo and Cecilia Tijerina starred as co-protagonists, while Julieta Egurrola, Raquel Olmedo, Claudio Báez, Alonso Echánove, Surya MacGregor, Óscar Traven and Alberto Estrella starred as antagonists. Rita Guerrero and Mariana Levy starred as stellar performances.

== Cast ==
- Manuel Landeta as Martín Garatuza
- Mariana Levy as Beatriz de Rivera
- Eduardo Capetillo as Román Garatuza
- Julieta Egurrola as Bruja Sarmiento
- Claudio Báez as Pedro de Mejía
- Alonso Echánove as El Ahuizote
- Óscar Traven as Alonso de River
- Cecilia Toussaint as Antonio de Araujo
- Cecilia Tijerina as Lucía de Rivera
- Rafael Rojas as César de Villaclara
- Rita Guerrero as Blanca de Mejía
- Álvaro Cerviño as Fernando de Quesada
- Surya MacGregor as Luisa Pérez de Varaiz
- Alberto Estrella as Carlos de Arellano
- Héctor Álvarez as Guillén
- Raquel Olmedo as Princess of Eboli
- Lupita Sandoval as Andrea
- Antonio Serrano as Teodoro
- Leonor Llausás as Cleofas
- Maripaz García as Lucrecia
- Jaime Vega as Anselmo
- Fernanda Ruizos as Berenice
- Álvaro Guerrero as Santillana
- Javier Díaz Dueñas as Virrey
- Juan Carlos Bidault as Román Garatuza (child)
