= Dolores Beristáin =

Mexican actress (1926–2010)

Dolores Beristáin (10 May 1926–27 April 2010), born Dolores Bravo Mancera, was a Mexican actress. She appeared in a variety of film and television roles from 1970 until 1999.

She was born on 10 May 1926 in Mexico City and later married actor Luis Beristáin. The granddaughter of Mexican philanthropist Gabriel Mancera, she began her singing career in 1942. Together with her sister María Teresa, she formed the duo Teresa y Lolita , "The Duo of Beauty and Youth," as they were billed on the radio. Later that decade, she debuted as an actress in the theater, in the play Los padres terribles (The Terrible Parents ), with María Teresa Montoya's company . Shortly afterward, she met fellow actor Luis Beristáin, with whom she had two sons: Francisco and Arturo , the latter a prominent actor. Dolores was widowed in 1962 and decided to resume her artistic career using her husband's surname. Her first job during this period was in the telenovela El dios de barro (The God of Clay ) in 1970. She was a great film actress, appearing in movies such as El rincón de las vírgenes (The Corner of the Virgins) , María de mi corazón (Maria of My Heart ), El secreto de Romelia (Romelia's Secret) (for which she won the Ariel Award for Best Supporting Actress ), Principio y fin (The Beginning and the End), and Hasta morir (Until I Die ) (for which she was nominated again for the Ariel Award , this time for Best Supporting Actress ). She also excelled on television, in telenovelas such as Las fieras (The Beasts) , La gloria y el infierno (Glory and Hell) , El padre Gallo (Father Gallo ), Tal como somos (Just as We Are) , La fuerza del amor (The Power of Love) , and La sombra del otro (The Shadow of the Other) , among others.

Her last acting role was in 2000, in the film Between Afternoon and Night . She died on April 27, 2010, due to respiratory complications.
