= 10th TVyNovelas Awards =

1992 Mexican TV awards

- Date: 1992
- Location: Mexico City
- Hosted by: Raúl Velasco

Highlights
- Most awards: Cadenas de amargura (8)
- Most nominations: Cadenas de amargura (13)

Television/radio coverage
- Network: Canal de las Estrellas

The 10th TVyNovelas Awards were an academy of special awards to the best soap operas and TV shows. The awards ceremony took place on 1992 in Mexico City. The ceremony was televised in Mexico by Canal de las Estrellas.

Raúl Velasco hosted the show. Cadenas de amargura won 8 awards, the most for the evening, including Best Telenovela. Other winners La pícara soñadora won 3 awards, Milagro y magia and Muchachitas won 2 awards and Alcanzar una estrella II, Al filo de la muerte and En carne propia won 1 each.

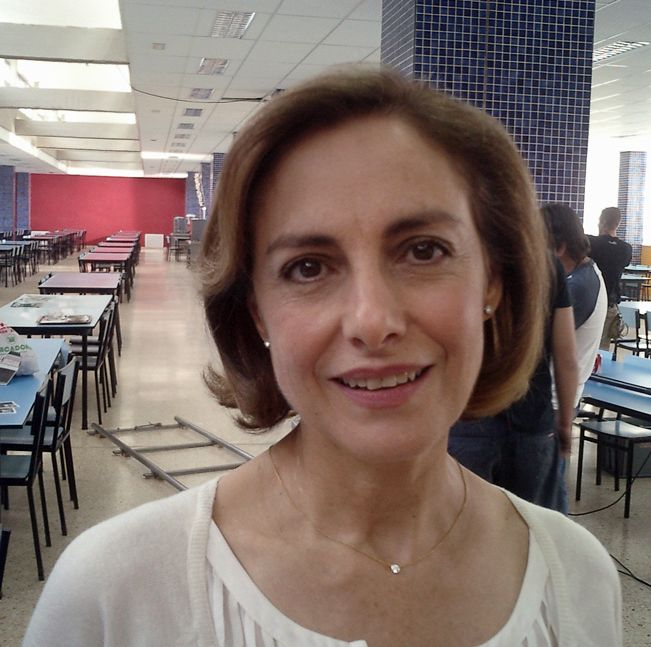
Diana Bracho, winner for Best Actress.

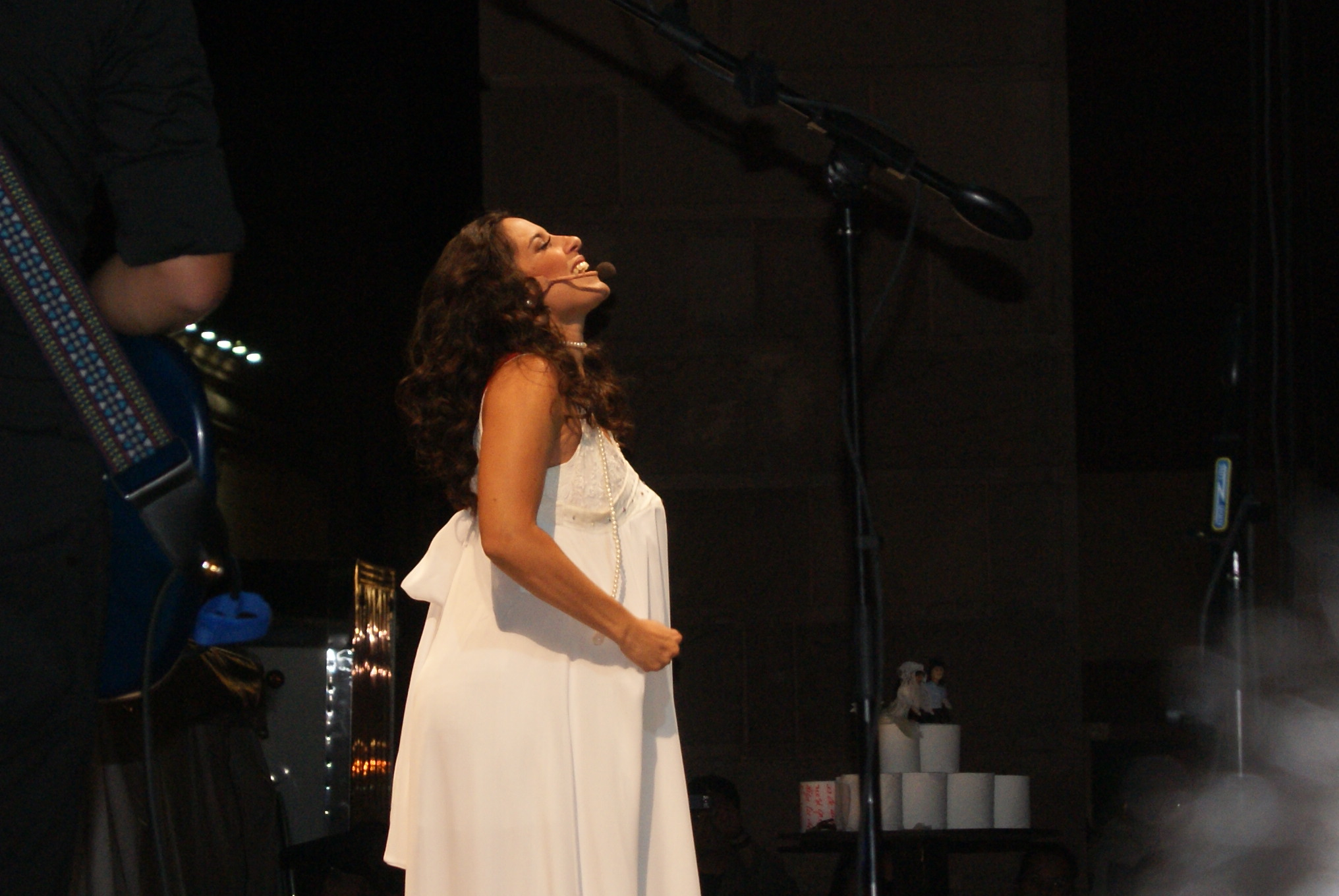
Tiaré Scanda, winner for Best Revelation.

== Summary of awards and nominations ==
Telenovela	Nominations	Awards
Cadenas de amargura	13	8
Amor de nadie	9	0
Yo no creo en los hombres	6	0
La pícara soñadora	5	3
Muchachitas	5	2
Milagro y magia	4	2
En carne propia	3	1
Alcanzar una estrella II	1	1
Al filo de la muerte	1	1
Madres egoístas	1	0

== Winners and nominees ==
=== Telenovelas ===
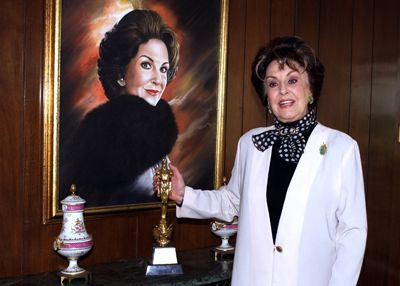
Marga López, awarded with a Special Award for 60 Years of Career.

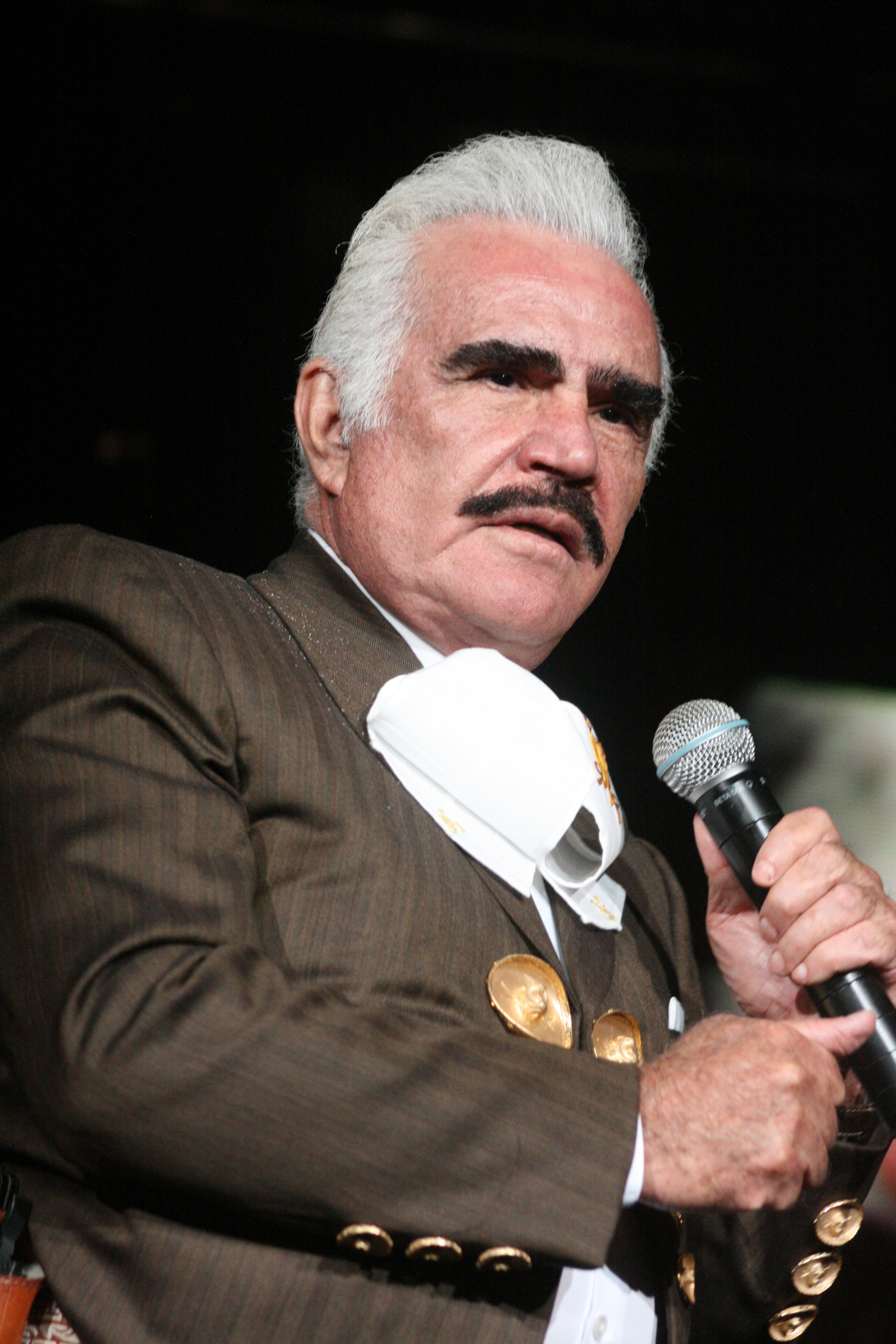
Vicente Fernández, awarded with a Special Award for Musical Career.

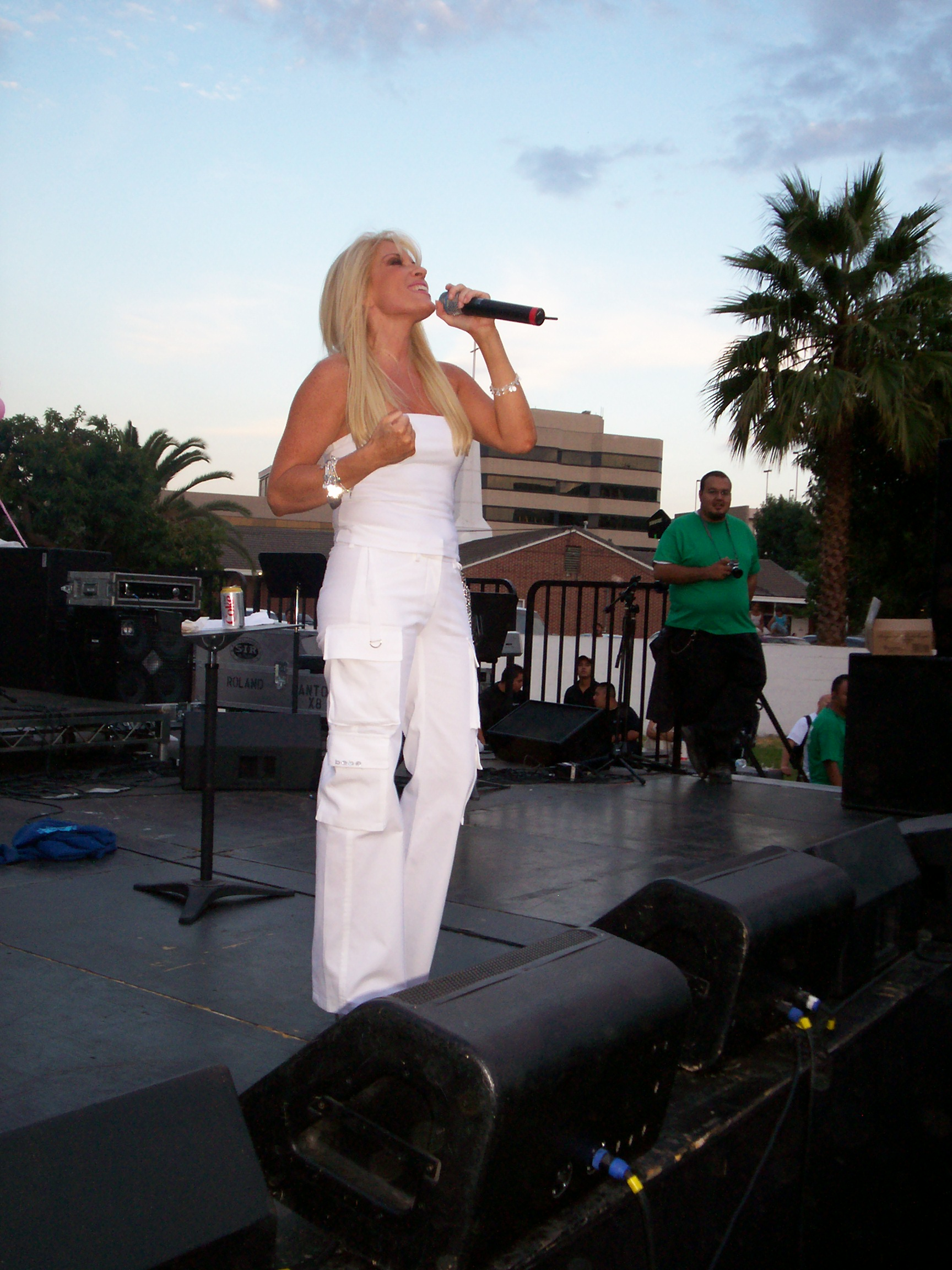
Yuri, awarded with a Special Recognition as Singer with Highest International Projection.

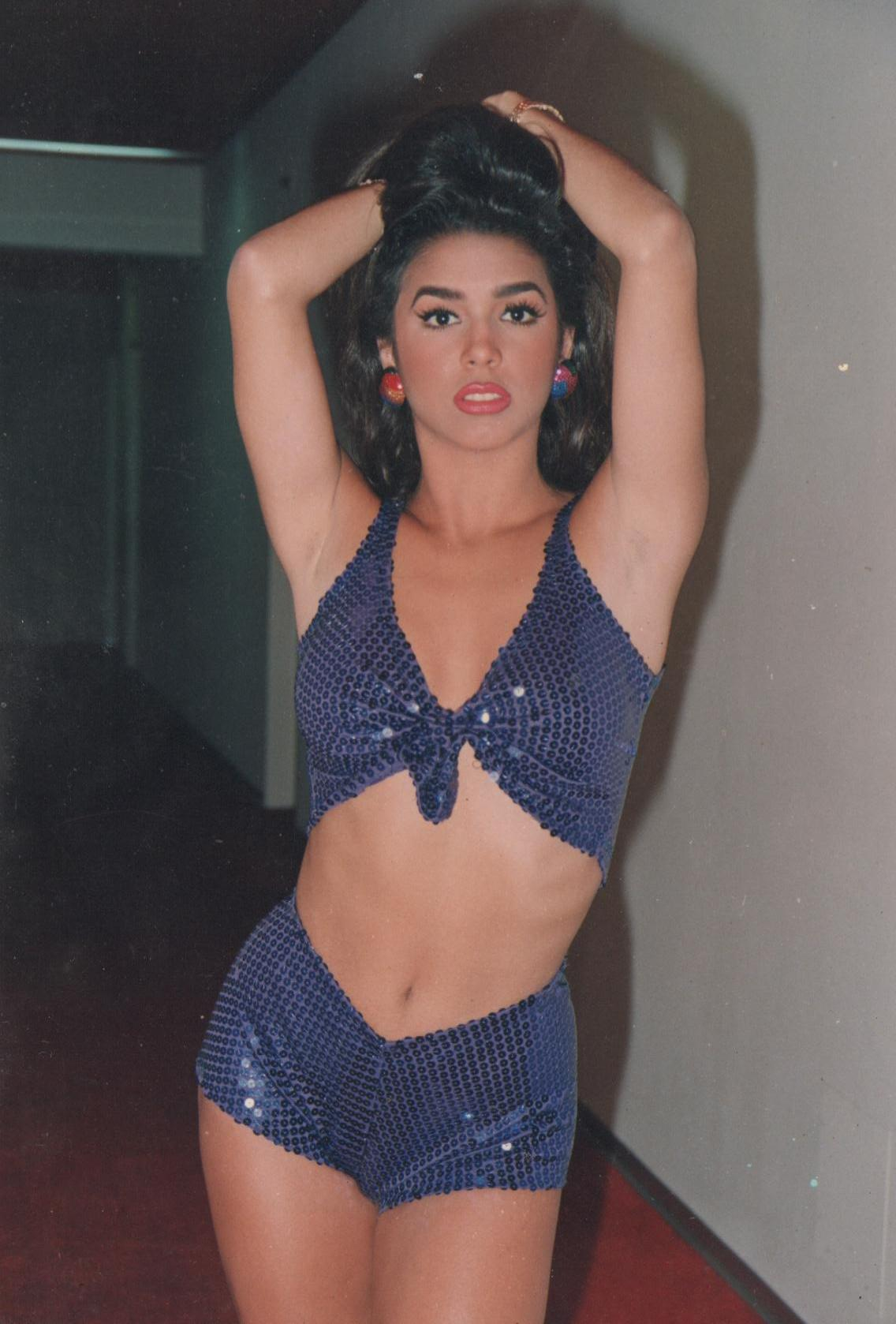
Bibi Gaytán, awarded with a Special Award for The Most Beautiful Hair.

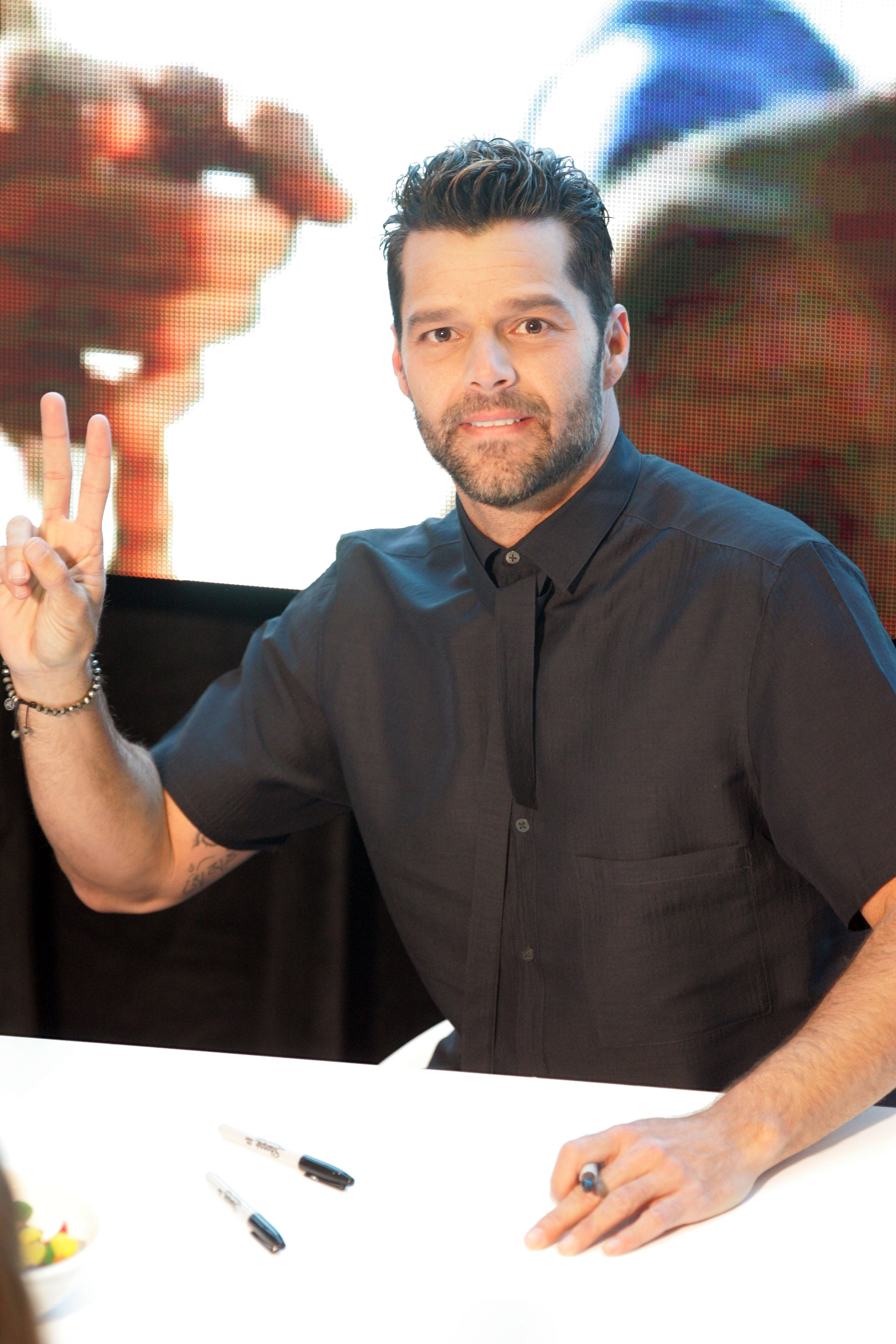
Ricky Martin, awarded with a Special Award for The Most Beautiful Hair.

Best Telenovela	Best Original Story or Adaptation
Cadenas de amargura; Amor de nadie; Yo no creo en los hombres	Florinda Meza – Milagro y magia
Best Actress	Best Actor
Diana Bracho – Cadenas de amargura; Gabriela Roel – Yo no creo en los hombres; Lucía Méndez – Amor de nadie	Humberto Zurita – Al filo de la muerte; Alfredo Adame – Yo no creo en los hombres; Eduardo Yáñez – En carne propia
Best Antagonist Actress	Best Antagonist Actor
Cynthia Klitbo – Cadenas de amargura; Alejandra Maldonado – Amor de nadie; Saby Kamalich – Yo no creo en los hombres	Gonzalo Vega – En carne propia; Alejandro Camacho – Muchachitas; Joaquín Cordero – Amor de nadie
Best Leading Actress	Best Leading Actor
Irán Eory – La pícara soñadora; Martha Roth – En carne propia; Ofelia Guilmáin – Milagro y magia	Tony Carbajal – Milagro y magia; Fernando Luján – Cadenas de amargura; Germán Robles – Amor de nadie
Best Co-lead Actress	Best Co-lead Actor
Delia Casanova – Cadenas de amargura; Margarita Sanz – Amor de nadie; Tina Romero – Cadenas de amargura	Rafael Inclán – La pícara soñadora; Ari Telch – Muchachitas; Fernando Allende – Amor de nadie
Best Supporting Actress	Best Supporting Actor
Laura León – Muchachitas; Aurora Molina – Cadenas de amargura; Irma Lozano – Amor de nadie	Otto Sirgo – Alcanzar una estrella II; Juan Antonio Edwards – Milagro y magia; Raymundo Capetillo – Cadenas de amargura
Best Young Lead Actress	Best Young Lead Actor
Daniela Castro – Cadenas de amargura; Ana Colchero – Yo no creo en los hombres; Mariana Levy – La pícara soñadora	Raúl Araiza – Cadenas de amargura; Eduardo Palomo – La pícara soñadora; Rafael Rojas – Yo no creo en los hombres
Best Revelation	Best Child Performance
Tiaré Scanda – Muchachitas; Alexis Ayala – Cadenas de amargura; Kate del Castillo – Muchachitas	Luis Guillermo Martell – La pícara soñadora; Anahí – Madres egoístas; José María Torre – Amor de nadie
Best Direction	Best Direction of the Cameras
Luis Vélez – Cadenas de amargura	Carlos Guerra Villarreal – Cadenas de amargura

=== Others ===
Best Comedy Program	Best Variety or Musical Program
¡Anabel!	Siempre en domingo
Best Comedy Actress	Best Comedy Actor
Anabel Ferreira – ¡Anabel!	Eugenio Derbez – ¡Anabel!
Best TV Host	Best Young Singer
Paco Stanley	Lucero
Singers of the Year	Best Teen Band
Magneto	Magneto

=== Special awards ===
- 60 Years of Career: Marga López
- Musical Career: Vicente Fernández
- Recognition as Singer with Highest International Projection: Yuri
- The Most Beautiful Hair: Bibi Gaytán and Ricky Martin

=== National Segment ===
This segment was awarded to the favorites, among them is:

- The Most Beautiful Legs of Mexican Show Business: Lucero
