= Gatica (surname) =

Gatica is a surname. Notable people with the surname include:

- Alfredo Gatica (born 1988), Mexican television actor
- Bárbara Gatica (born 1996), Chilean tennis player
- Humberto Gatica, Chilean-born American record producer, music mixer, and audio engineer
- José María Gatica (1925–1963), Argentine boxer
- Lucho Gatica (1928–2018), Chilean bolero singer, film actor, and television host
- Luis Gatica (born 1961), Mexican actor
- Malú Gatica (1922–1997), Chilean actress and singer
- Rodolfina Gatica Garzón (born 1965), Mexican politician
