= Rayito de luz =

- Genre: Telenovela
- Based on: Marcelino by José María Sánchez-Silva
- Written by: Socorro González
- Directed by: Alejandro Aragón; Gustavo Loza; Martín Pérez Islas
- Starring: Alejandro Speitzer; Alan; Mariana Levy; Aarón Hernán; Delia Casanova; Gerardo Murguía; Mariana Levy
- Opening theme: "Rayito de luz" by Alan
- Country of origin: Mexico
- Original language: Spanish
- No. of seasons: 1
- No. of episodes: 20

Production
- Executive producer: Rosy Ocampo

Original release
- Network: Canal de las Estrellas
- Release: 11 December 2000 – 5 January 2001

Rayito de luz (English: Ray of Light), is a Mexican childhood telenovela. Alejandro Speitzer and Alan star as the protagonists, while Delia Casanova star as the antagonist. This soap opera is based on the book Marcelino, by José María Sánchez-Silva, and was recorded at Real del Monte, also known as Mineral del Monte, Hidalgo.

== Plot ==
It all begins when a boy named Abel Ventura comes to a quiet town called San Pedro Mountains to start a career in priesthood in the seminary Reutilicos Brothers.

He is a musician-minded priest who is fleeing the city because of a broken heart, hoping to find peace within and devote his life to God.

A year after his arrival Abel within the confessional to an abandoned along with a written in an unknown language for seminarians and all he could decipher was named "Juan de Luz" a child full of life seminar letter child.

== Cast ==
- Alejandro Speitzer as Juan de Luz "Rayito"
- Alan as Hermano Abel Ventura
- Mariana Levy as Francisca Buenrostro
- Gerardo Murguía as José Niño
- Aarón Hernán as Padre Constantino
- Delia Casanova as Gertrudis Montes
- Luis de Icaza as Hermano Higinio Huerta
- Francisco Rossell as Hermano Fidel Rulfo
- Juan Carlos Casasola as Justino Hernández
- Tania Vázquez as Catalina Cienfuegos
- Bárbara Ferré as Hortensia Buenrostro
- Marcela Páez as Mirna López
- Vanessa Angers as Esther de Lerma
- Luis Gatica as Cruz Ramírez
- Oscar Traven as Florencio Lerma
- Rafael Rojas as Antonio Sánchez
- Roberto D’Amico as Dr. Domingo Mendieta
- Eduardo Quesada as Hermano Nacho
- Danna Paola Rivera as Lupita Lerma
- Hendrick Marine as Aldo Lerma
- Isamar Martínez as Vicky Lerma
- Martha Sabrina Martínez as Karina Ramírez
- Manuel Bermúdez as Óscar Sánchez
- Suzeth Cerame as Carmelita Sánchez
- Lourdes Munguía as Lucía Prado
- Susana González as Minilla
