= Triángulo =

Triángulo may refer to:

- Triángulo (album), an album by Pappo's Blues
- Triángulo (TV series), a Mexican telenovela
