= Gatica =

Gatica may refer to:

- Gatica (surname)
- Gatika, a town in Spain
- Gatica, el mono, a 1993 Argentine drama film

== See also ==
- Gattaca, a 1997 American science-fiction film
