= Luz María Jerez =

Mexican actress (born 1958)

- Born: July 5, 1958 (age 68); San Miguel de Allende, Guanajuato, Mexico
- Occupation: Actor

Luz María Jerez is a Mexican actress in movies, television, and theater. She was born in San Miguel de Allende in the state Guanajuato on July 5, 1958.

== Early life ==
Luz María Jerez was born July 5, 1958. She started her career as an actress in theater in 1980, in a piece by Australian Morris West called El hereje, or The Heretic. The following year she debuted on television in the telenovela of Irene Sabido, called Nosotras las mujeres, or We the Women, and in 1983 debuted in the movie El día que murió Pedro Infante. Since then she has developed a solid career as a notable actress in movies, television, and theater. She has been in plays like Juegos de alcoba, No tengo no pago, El jardín de las delicias, La Celestina, Desencuentros, La casa de Bernarda Alba, Cinco mujeres and Las arpías, among many others.

== Career ==
She has acted in movies like Silencio asesino, Noche de carnaval, Hasta que la muerte nos separe, Operación asesinato, La segunda noche and Castidad. Jerez has also been in telenovelas: Tú o nadie, El engaño, Yo compro esa mujer, Al filo de la muerte, Triángulo, Dos mujeres, un camino, Tres mujeres, Laberintos de pasión, Así son ellas, Al diablo con los guapos and Querida enemiga. She has also participated in television series like Mujeres asesinas and Hermanos y detectives.

In 2011 Jerez participated in the telenovela produced by Mapat L. de Zatarain called Ni contigo ni sin ti, or Neither With nor Without You, as Irene, a mother who neglects her family.

She worked on the telenovela Un refugio para el amor, or A Refuge for Love, a production by Ignacio Sada Madero in which she played Conny Fuentes Gil, the sister of the villain that was played by Laura Flores.

In 2013 she joined the cast of the telenovela Quiero amarte, or I Want to Love You, produced by Carlos Moreno Laguillo, and she embodied the character of Eloisa Ugarte, little sister of Lucrecia Ugarte de Montesinos, the character of main actress Diana Bracho.

In 2014 Jerez worked under the orders of producer Giselle González Salgado in her solo debut in the telenovela Yo no creo en los hombres, or I Don't Believe in the Men, where she shared credit with Azela Robinson, Rosa María Bianchi, Flavio Medina, Alejandro Camacho and Estefanía Villareal, among others.

== List of works ==
=== Television ===
- Hermanas, un amor compartido – Rosario Juárez Cienfuegos
- Marea de pasiones (2024) – Leonor Grajales
- El amor invencible (2023) – Clara
- Esta historia me suena (2022)
- Pena ajena (2022) - Maricarmen
- Quererlo todo (2020-2021) – Minerva Larraguibel
- Cita a ciegas (2019) – Lorena
- Sin miedo a la verdad (2019) - Terapeuta
- Por amar sin ley (2018-2019) – Pilar Huerta
- Mi marido tiene familia (2017-2019) – Belén Gómez Beltrán
- La candidata (2016–2017) – Noemí Ríos de Bárcenas
- Tres veces Ana (2016) – Julieta de Escárcega
- Lo imperdonable (2015) – Lucía Hidalgo
- Yo no creo en los hombres (2014–2015) – Alma Mondragón de Bustamante
- Quiero amarte (2013–2014) – Eloísa Ugarte
- Nueva vida (2013) - Ingrid
- Como dice el dicho (2013) – Natalia
- Durmiendo con mi jefe (2013) – Edith de Urrutia
- Un refugio para el amor (2012) – Constanza "Conny" Fuentes Gil Vda. de San Emeterio
- Ni contigo ni sin ti (2011) -Irene Olmedo de Rivas
- Sueña Conmigo (2010–2011) – Elena Molina
- Hermanos y detectives (2009) – Doctora
- Verano de amor (2009) – Aura de Roca
- La rosa de Guadalupe (2008–2010) – Úrsula / Teresa
- Mujeres asesinas (2008) – Clara Fernández
- Querida enemiga (2008) – Bárbara Amezcua de Armendariz
- Al diablo con los guapos (2007–2008) – Milena de Senderos
- Código Postal (2006–2007) – Irene Alonso de Rojas
- Bajo el mismo techo (2005) - Carmen
- Clap... el lugar de tus sueños (2003–2004) – Victoria
- Así son ellas (2002–2003) – Rosa Corso de Calderón
- La revancha (2001-2002)
- Por un beso (2000–2001) – Fernanda Lavalle de Díaz de León
- Cuento de Navidad (1999–2000) – Brisia
- Tres mujeres (1999–2000) – Renata Gamboa
- Laberintos de pasión (1999–2000) – Marissa Cervantes
- Desencuentro (1997–1998) – Sandra Lombardo
- La antorcha encendida (1996) – Doña Catalina de Irigoyen
- El premio mayor (1995–1996) – Cristina Molina
- El vuelo del águila (1994–1995) – Doña Inés
- Dos mujeres, un camino (1993–1994) – Alejandra Montegarza
- Triángulo (1992) – Mariana Armendariz
- Al filo de la muerte (1991–1992) – Iris Salgado
- Yo compro esa mujer (1990) – Úrsula
- Tal como somos (1987–1988) – Beatriz
- Lista negra (1986) – Violeta
- El engaño (1986) – Aminta Alvírez de Gunther / Mindy Gunther
- La hora marcada (1986)
- Tú o nadie (1985) – Martha Samaniego
- Nosotras las mujeres (1981-1982) – Lucila

=== Movies ===
- Acapulco, la vida va (2014) – Carmen
- Todas mias (2013) – Paulina
- Castidad (2010)
- La curva del olvido (2004)
- La segunda noche (1999)
- Secuestro salvaje (1994)
- Imperio de los malditos (1992)
- Sólo con Tu Pareja (1991) – Paola
- La venganza de los punks (1991)
- La tentación (1991) – Genoveva
- Secuestro equivocado (1991)
- Cóndor blanco (1991)
- Ritmo, traición y muerte (1991)
- Orgía de terror (1990)
- Machos (1990)
- Hasta que la muerte nos separe (1989) – Griselda
- Operación asesinato (1989)
- Flaco flaco, pero no para tu taco (1989)
- Entrada de la noche (1989)
- Un paso al más acá (1988) – María
- Relajo matrimonial (1988)
- Adorables criminales (1987)
- Los ojos del muerto (1987)
- Astucia (1986)
- El último disparo (1985)
- Noche de carnaval (1984) – Tulia Rivera
- Buenas, y con ... movidas (1983)
- Aborto: canta a la vida (1983)
- Preparatoria (1983)
- Silencio asesino (1983) – Martita
- Los cuates de la Rosenda (1982)
- Muerte en el Río Grande (1982) – Amiga de Pat
- El día que murió Pedro Infante (1982)

=== Theater ===
- Un amante a la medida (2009)
- Las arpías (2009)
- Monólogos de la vagina (2008)
- Electra (2006)
- Hombres (2005)
- Trampa de muerte (2004)
- Cinco mujeres (2003)
- La casa de Bernarda Alba (2002)
- Desencuentros (2000)
- El viaje superficial (1997)
- Juegos de sociedad (1994)
- El jardín de las delicias (1985)
- Mi amiga la gorda (1985)
- La loba (1984)
- Sálvese quien pueda (1984)
- No tengo no pago (1984)
- La Celestina (1982–1987)
- Juegos de alcoba (1981)
- El hereje (1981)

== Awards and nominations ==
Premios TVyNovelas
Year	Category	Telenovela	Resultado
1986	Best Young Actress	Tú o nadie	Winner

Premios Bravo(Brave Awards)
Year	Category	Telenovela	Resultado
2013	Primera Actriz por Programa Unitario	Como dice el dicho	Winner
