= Don't Panic (film) =

- Promotional poster
- Directed by: Rubén Galindo Jr.
- Screenplay by: Rubén Galindo Jr.
- Produced by: Raúl Galindo; Bruce Glenn
- Starring: Jon Michael Bischof; Gabriela Hassel; Helena Rojo; Jorge Luke; Juan Ignacio Aranda; Eduardo Noriega; Roberto Palazuelos; Raúl Araiza
- Cinematography: Miguel Arana; Daniel López
- Edited by: Carlos Savage
- Music by: Jon Michael Bischof; Pedro Plascencia
- Production companies: Dynamic Films; Producciones Galubi S.A. de C.V.; Producciones Torrente S.A.
- Release date: 2 March 1989
- Running time: 90 minutes
- Country: Mexico
- Language: English

Don't Panic (Spanish: El secreto de la ouija, lit. "The secret of the Ouija") is a 1987 English-language Mexican supernatural horror film written and directed by Rubén Galindo Jr., and starring Jon Michael Bischof, Gabriela Hassel, Helena Rojo, Juan Ignacio Aranda, Eduardo Noriega, Roberto Palazuelos, and Raúl Araiza. Its plot follows a teenage boy who unleashes evil forces using a Ouija board on his seventeenth birthday.

== Cast ==
- Jon Michael Bischof as Michael
- Gabriela Hassel as Alexandra
- Helena Rojo as Mrs. Smit
- Jorge Luke as Lt. Velazco
- Juan Ignacio Aranda as Tony
- Eduardo Noriega as Fred
- Roberto Palazuelos as John
- Raúl Araiza as Robert
- Edna Bolkan as Teacher
- Evangelina Elizondo as Reception Nurse
- Mindie McCullum as Cristy
- Cecilia Tijerina as Debbie
- Mario Iván Martínez as Peter
- Luis Gatica as Luis
- Humberto Elizondo as T.V. Reporter
- Joe Herrera as Jose

== Release ==
Vinegar Syndrome released the film on Blu-ray on 26 January 2021.

== Reception ==
Screen Slate writer Chris Shields notes that the film is regarded as derivative of A Nightmare on Elm Street (1984).
