= Yo no pedí vivir =

Mexican telenovela

- Genre: Telenovela
- Created by: Original Story: Celia Alcántara; Adaptation: Luisa Xammar
- Directed by: Miguel Córcega
- Starring: María Rivas; Mapita Cortés; Elizabeth Dupeyrón
- Country of origin: Mexico
- Original language: Spanish

Production
- Executive producer: Irene Sabido

Original release
- Network: Canal de las Estrellas
- Release: 1977

Yo no pedí vivir, is a Mexican telenovela produced by Irene Sabido for Televisa in 1977. Starring by Mapita Cortés, María Rivas and Elizabeth Dupeyrón.

== Cast ==
- Mapita Cortés as Gabriela Morando
- María Rivas as Soledad Nájera
- Antonio Medellín as César
- Elizabeth Dupeyrón as Irene
- Mario Casillas as Esteban
- Eric del Castillo as Pedro
- Carlos Fernández as Germán
- Yolanda Ciani as Lucía
- Mercedes Pascual as Sara
- Fernando Larrañaga as Mauricio
- María Fernanda as Martha Zárate
- Lourdes Canale as Josefa
- Odila Flores as Viviana
- Carlos Rotzinger as Francisco
- Miguel Gómez Checa as Fabio
- Martha Patricia as Michelle
- Josefina Echánove as Rosa
- Jorge Mondragón
- Alberto Inzúa
- Alfonso Meza
