= Alfredo Gatica =

Mexican actor

- Born: 8 February 1988 (age 38)
- Education: Centro de Educación Artística
- Occupation: Actor
- Years active: 2011–present
- Relatives: Mapita Cortés (grandmother); Lucho Gatica (grandfather); Luis Gatica (uncle)

Alfredo Gatica (born 8 February 1988) is a Mexican television actor; best known for his role of Ricardo in the Televisa telenovela La vecina (2015–2016). His other TV roles include: Orlando in the 2016 telenovela Tres veces Ana, adaptation of the 1996 telenovela Lazos de amor. Rulo in Enamorándome de Ramón, Mexican adaptation of the Venezuelan telenovela Tomasa Tequiero, and El Turco Nasif in the Mexican adaptation of the Argentine telenovela Sos mi hombre. Alfredo is the nephew of Luis Gatica, and grandson of Lucho Gatica and Mapita Cortés.

== Life ==
He was born in Mexico City on 8 February 1988. He studied at Televisa's CEA and graduated in 2010, where he began playing several small roles in the unitary series such as Como dice el dicho and La rosa de Guadalupe.

In 2012 he made his debut in the telenovela Cachito de cielo with the character of 'Darío' and where he shared credits with Maite Perroni, Pedro Fernández and Mané de la Parra.

In 2013 he gave life to 'Abdul García' in Lucero Suárez's telenovela De que te quiero, te quiero and where he shared the scene with Livia Brito, Juan Diego Covarrubias, Cynthia Klitbo and Fabiola Guajardo.

For 2015 he gets his first antagonistic role and the one that gave him the most acting relevance, in La vecina and again by the hand of the producer Lucero Suárez playing 'Ricardo Segura' along with Esmeralda Pimentel, Juan Diego Covarrubias, and Natalia Guerrero.

A year later in 2016 he gets a small role in Angelli Nesma Medina's telenovela Tres veces Ana where he gave life to 'Orlando'.

The following year (2017) for the third time the producer Lucero Suárez called him to impersonate 'Rulo' 'Grijalba' in Enamorándome de Ramón where he shares credits with José Ron and Esmeralda Pimentel.

Finally in 2019 he gave life to 'Ariel "El Turco" Nasif' in Ringo working for the fourth time alongside Lucero Suárez and sharing the scene alongside Mariana Torres, Jose Ron, Jorge Poza and Gabriela Carrillo.

== Filmography ==
Television performance
Year	Title	Roles	Notes
2011–2018	Como dice el dicho	Various roles	4 episodes
2012–2014	La rosa de Guadalupe	Various roles	5 episodes
2012	Cachito de cielo	Darío	Series regular; 26 episodes
2013–2014	De que te quiero, te quiero	Abdul	Series regular; 151 episodes
2014	The Stray Cat	Unknown role	4 episodes
2015–2016	La vecina	Ricardo	Series regular; 142 episodes
2016	Tres veces Ana	Orlando	Series regular; 69 episodes
2017	Enamorándome de Ramón	Rulo	Series regular; 80 episodes
2018	Tenías que ser tú	Unknown role	Episode: "Marisa se enfrenta con Marcelo por la custodia de Nicole"
2019	Ringo	El Turco Nasif	Series regular; 81 episodes
2020	Rubí	Loreto Mata	Series regular
2020–2021	Esta historia me suena	Rodrigo Cuco	Episode: "Amigos no por favor" Episode: "Pobre de ti"
2020	Vencer el desamor	Cuauhtémoc "Cuau" Vargas	Supporting role; 30 Episodes
2022	Amor dividido	José Licona	Series regular
2022	Mi camino es amarte	Cesar Ramirez	Series regular
2023	Eternamente amándonos	Fidel Fuentes	Series regular
2024	Marea de pasiones	Alfonso Marrero	
2025	La Jefa	Arturo Corona	
2025	Mi verdad oculta	Luciano Lomelí	
2026	Tan cerca de ti, nace el amor	Marcos	
