= Marionetas =

- Genre: Telenovela; Drama
- Created by: María Antonieta Saavedra
- Directed by: Miguel Córcega
- Starring: Alma Delfina; Ana Silvia Garza; Jéssica Jurado; Lucero Lander; Martha Navarro; Azucena Rodríguez; Fernando Ciangherotti; Mapita Cortés
- Theme music composer: Amparo Rubín
- Opening theme: Instrumental
- Country of origin: Mexico
- Original language: Spanish
- No. of episodes: 125

Production
- Executive producer: Eugenio Cobo
- Production locations: Mexico City, Mexico
- Production company: Televisa

Original release
- Network: Canal de las Estrellas
- Release: April 7 – September 26, 1986

Related
- Principessa; Cicatrices del alma

Marionetas (English title:Marionettes) is a Mexican telenovela produced by Eugenio Cobo for Televisa in 1986. It is an original story of María Antonieta Saavedra and directed by Miguel Córcega.

Alma Delfina, Ana Silvia Garza and Jéssica Jurado starred as protagonists.

== Plot ==
Laura, Magdalena and Alejandra are three young men who come to Mexico City to study their college careers. Upon meeting, form a kind of family to support each other. Magdalena studying medicine. It is the most focused of the three, and that creates the balance between extreme personalities Alejandra and Laura. He meets and falls in love with Gustavo. Eventually they marry.

Alejandra studying law. It is the most rational and analytical of the three, and sometimes becomes hard and intolerant. Luis marries and has children, but over the years, he is unfaithful. Luis tries to reconcile with Alejandra, but she does not accept his apology. In the end, Magdalena asks if never forgive Luis and Alejandra responds that he can not say 'never', but you doubt it, because when they married promised never hurt, and that did not happen.

Laura is the most open and generous of the three, but also the most disappointment suffered. He falls for Jorge, but he is unfaithful and marries a woman of money, the daughter of his boss. Years later fall in love again, this time from Francisco, a married man. This forbidden romance makes distance itself from Alejandra and Laura who, as married women, can not understand that her friend is a "rompehogares" and willing to be the other woman.

After being separated, Francisco and Laura are seeing. He does not come to the appointment and she believes have deceived again. Two days later, Laura is visited by the daughter of Francisco, who reveals that he had a heart attack the day I had an appointment. Also note that, before dying, asked him to go see Laura to tell who was the love of his life.

Concerned depression Laura, Magdalena and Alejandra will see it, and make up with her. The three friends are together again.

== Cast ==
- Alma Delfina as Laura Contreras
- Ana Silvia Garza as Magdalena Santacruz
- Jéssica Jurado as Alejandra Valencia
- Lucero Lander as Mariana
- Martha Navarro as Sofía
- Azucena Rodríguez as Leonor
- Fernando Ciangherotti as Gustavo Almada
- Mapita Cortés as Adriana Gallardo
- Luis Couturier as Marcelo
- Ernesto Laguardia as Sergio
- Manuel López Ochoa as Francisco Mallén
- Isaura Espinoza as Elvira García
- Luis Gatica as Jorge Linares
- Juan Felipe Preciado as Alfredo
- David Ostrosky as Luis
