= La pícara soñadora (2026 TV series) =

- Genre: Romantic comedy
- Based on: La pícara soñadora by Abel Santa Cruz
- Developed by: Erika Morales
- Directed by: Bernardo X. Serna; Robby Chapa Ceballos
- Starring: Abril Di Yorio; Darío Duque; José Luis Cordero; Fernando Mitre; Alexa Archundia; Ana Sáenz; Ernesto Alejandro
- Theme music composer: Valentín Pimstein; Carlos Vertiz Pani; Héctor Ruiz
- Opening theme: "La pícara soñadora" by Abril Di Yorio
- Composers: Eduardo Diazayas; Luis Parra; Eduardo Sánchez Fonseca
- Country of origin: Mexico
- Original language: Spanish
- No. of seasons: 1
- No. of episodes: 21

Production
- Executive producers: Carlos Murguía; Eduardo Murguía
- Producer: Alberto Barrera González
- Cinematography: Julio Fons; José Jiménez; Juan Sánchez
- Editors: Carlos Rodríguez; Roger Cámara; Luis Carlos Delgado Galván; Rodrigo Serrano
- Camera setup: Multi-camera
- Production company: TelevisaUnivision

Original release
- Network: Canal 5
- Release: 24 August – 25 September 2026

La pícara soñadora (English: A Mischievous Dreamer) is a Mexican romantic comedy television series based on the 1991 telenovela of the same name, created by Abel Santa Cruz. The series stars Abril Di Yorio and Darío Duque. It aired on Canal 5 from 24 August 2026 to 25 September 2026.

== Plot ==
Lupita López is a young woman who works in a department store. Her dream is to become the manager of the store, so every day she works hard with enthusiasm in the toy department. Her career is on the rise until things get complicated with the arrival of a new employee, Carlos Perez, who is the complete opposite of her: he's lazy and uninterested in his work, which causes them to constantly argue and distracts her from her goal. However, amid all the arguments, love blossoms. Lupita falls for Carlos' noble heart, and he is inspired by Lupita to become the best version of himself. The only problem is that they're both living a lie. Lupita is secretly living in the department store, and Carlos is actually Alfredo Rochild, the heir to the department store empire.

== Cast ==
=== Main ===
- Abril Di Yorio as Lupita López
- Darío Duque as Alfredo Rochild / Carlos Pérez
- José Luis Cordero "Pocholo" as Camilo
- Fernando Mitre as Carlos Pérez
- Alexa Archundia as Giovana Carini
- Ana Sáenz as Rosa Fernández
- Ernesto Alejandro as Federico Rochild

=== Recurring and guest stars ===
- Beto Torres as Gregorio
- Diana Golden as Gladis
- Eugenia Cauduro as Principal Jiménez
- Mariela Rueda as Carla
- Eder Animas as Julio Zamora "Pollito"
- Luz Edith Rojas as Detective Panchita Benítez
- Beto Rojas as Detective Raúl Benítez
- Karia Sofía Hernández as Olivia
- Maryel Abrego as Paloma
- María José de la Cruz as Bárbara
- Pedro Giunti as Zamora
- Alejandro Valencia as Claudio García
- Víctor Varona as Osvaldo
- Adriana Chapela as Marcelina
- Luis Orozco as Arnulfo
- Luciana Sismondi as Elvira
- Bárbara Carbajal as Marianne
- Melody Murguía as Agustina
- Andrea Tress
- Daniel Keiji as Mr. Chong
- Santiago Sandoval
- María Prado as Sandra
- Manu Nna as Juan Chismes
- Andreas Pears as Carini
- Karla Mora as Lucía
- Gabriel Almaguer as Pedro
- Teresa Esquivel as Nurse Betty
- Julio Maldonado as Officer Álvarez
- Eduardo Garzón as Officer Morales
- Haunani Ruiz as Sol

== Production ==
The series was announced on 25 March 2026. Filming began on 15 April 2026.

== Ratings ==
Viewership and ratings per season of La pícara soñadora
Season	Timeslot (CT)	Episodes	First aired		Last aired		Avg. viewers (millions)
Season	Timeslot (CT)	Episodes	Date	Viewers (millions)	Date	Viewers (millions)	Avg. viewers (millions)
1	Mon–Fri 7:00 p.m.	21	24 August 2026	0.43	25 September 2026	0.41	0.49

== Episodes ==
No.	Title	Written by	Original release date	Mexico viewers (millions)
1	"Mentiras y sueños"	Indra Villaseñor Amador	24 August 2026	0.43
2	"Cinco minutos"	Paulina Barros	25 August 2026	0.65
3	"La hora Rochild"	Aleluya Rivera	26 August 2026	0.39
4	"Una cita... de negocios"	Ricardo Peña Ortiz	27 August 2026	0.37
5	"¿Qué pasó ayer?"	Indra Villaseñor Amador	28 August 2026	0.72
6	"El desfile Rochild"	Kevin Bertram	31 August 2026	0.46
7	"Control de daños"	Ana Moreno Hernández	1 September 2026	0.49
8	"El hombre de mis sueños"	Paulina Barros	2 September 2026	0.38
9	"Una noche mágica"	Aleluya Rivera	4 September 2026	0.69
10	"Fuera máscaras"	Indra Villaseñor Amador	7 September 2026	0.81
11	"Del amor al odio"	Ricardo Peña Ortiz	8 September 2026	0.39
12	"Fantasmas del pasado"	Kevin Bertram	10 September 2026	0.42
13	"La gerente de la tienda es..."	Kevin Bertram	11 September 2026	0.46
14	"El gran fin"	Aleluya Rivera	14 September 2026	0.33
15	"Alfredo presidente"	Paulina Barros	17 September 2026	0.52
16	"Consecuencias"	Indra Villaseñor Amador	18 September 2026	0.50
17	"Soñar despierta"	Ricardo Peña Ortiz	21 September 2026	0.57
18	"Si la montaña no viene"	Indra Villaseñor Amador	22 September 2026	0.46
19	"No más víctima"	Paulina Barros	23 September 2026	0.38
20	"Un nuevo sueño"	Aleluya Rivera	24 September 2026	0.41
21	"La pícara soñadora"	Kevin Bertram	25 September 2026	0.41
