= En carne propia =

Mexican television series

- Genre: Telenovela
- Created by: Carlos Olmos
- Written by: Carlos Olmos; Enrique Serna
- Directed by: Carlos Téllez; Soledad Ruiz
- Starring: Gonzalo Vega; Edith González; Eduardo Yáñez
- Opening theme: En carne propia by Pedro Plascencia Salinas
- Country of origin: Mexico
- Original language: Spanish
- No. of episodes: 185

Production
- Executive producer: Carlos Téllez
- Cinematography: Gabriel Vázquez Bulmán; Héctor Dupuy
- Running time: 21–22 minutes
- Production company: Televisa

Original release
- Network: Canal de las Estrellas
- Release: December 3, 1990 – August 16, 1991

Related
- Destino; Atrapada

En carne propia (English title: In My Own Flesh) is a Mexican telenovela produced by Carlos Téllez for Televisa in 1990.

The series stars Gonzalo Vega, Edith González and Eduardo Yáñez.

== Cast ==
- Gonzalo Vega as Octavio Muriel
- Edith González as Estefanía Muriel Dumont / Natalia de Jesús Ortega / Estefanía Dumont
- Eduardo Yáñez as Leonardo Rivadeneira
- Martha Roth as Leda de Dumont
- Sebastián Ligarde as Abigaíl Jiménez
- Mariana Levy as Dulce Olivia Serrano
- Cecilia Toussaint as Laura Gámez
- Susana Alexander as Mother Carolina Jones
- Norma Lazareno as Gertrudis de Serrano
- Claudio Báez as Father Gerardo Serret
- Liliana Weimer as Coral Labrada
- Raúl Meraz as Alfonso Dumont
- Martha Aura as Ángela
- Javier Herranz as Julio
- Maya Ramos as Julia
- Óscar Narváez as Agustín Guzmán
- Fernando Amaya as Dr. Reyes
- Verónica Terán as Astrid
- Noé Murayama as Commander Eusebio Obregón
- Manuel López Ochoa as Inspector Pacheco
- Juan Peláez as Jerónimo Serrano
- Angélica Aragón as Magdalena Dumont de Muriel

== Awards and nominations ==
| Year | Award | Category | Nominee | Result |
|---|---|---|---|---|
| 1992 | TVyNovelas Awards | Best Actor | Eduardo Yáñez | Nominated |
| 1992 | TVyNovelas Awards | Best Antagonist Actor | Gonzalo Vega | Won |
| 1992 | TVyNovelas Awards | Best Leading Actress | Martha Roth | Nominated |
| 1992 | Latin ACE Awards | Best Scenic Program | En carne propia | Won |
| 1992 | Latin ACE Awards | Best Actor | Gonzalo Vega | Won |
| 1992 | Latin ACE Awards | Best Supporting Actor | Sebastián Ligarde | Won |
| 1992 | Latin ACE Awards | Best Direction | Carlos Téllez | Won |
