= La pícara soñadora =

- Genre: Telenovela; Romance
- Created by: Abel Santa Cruz
- Written by: Verónica Pimstein; Valeria Phillips; Dolores Ortega
- Directed by: Raquel Parot; Luis Gimeno
- Starring: Mariana Levy; Eduardo Palomo
- Theme music composer: Carlos Vertiz Pani; Héctor Ruiz
- Opening theme: La pícara soñadora by Mariana Levy
- Country of origin: Mexico
- Original language: Spanish
- No. of episodes: 80

Production
- Executive producer: Valentín Pimstein
- Producers: Salvador Mejía; Verónica Pimstein
- Production locations: Mexico City, Mexico
- Cinematography: Alejandro Frutos; Roberto Gómez Fernández
- Running time: 41-44 minutes
- Production company: Televisa

Original release
- Network: Canal de las Estrellas
- Release: September 2 – December 20, 1991

Related
- Carrusel de las Américas (1992); Pícara Sonhadora (2001); Sueños y caramelos (2005); La pícara soñadora (2026)

La pícara soñadora (English title: The Mischievous Dreamer) is a Mexican telenovela produced by Valentín Pimstein for Televisa in 1991. Based on a La Pícara soñadora, a 1956 Argentine film of the same name, directed by Ernesto Arancibia. It starred Mariana Levy and Eduardo Palomo.

== Plot ==
Lupita is young, pretty, and studies law. Though her future seems bright, she is penniless for now, so she lives in Sares Rochilds department store. By day, she works as a salesgirl in the toy department, and her uncle works nights as a security guard.

Everything she "borrows" from the store to live on, she writes down in a little book so that she can repay it when she finishes her studies. She has it all planned. But one day, she meets a guy outside the office of the owner of the department store. She thinks he is there to apply for a job, and Alfredo decides to play along.

Although the owner is his father, he uses the name of his best friend, pretends to be poor and arranges for himself to get a job there in order to chase the cute Lupita. Alfredo has always been a lazy bum and a flirt, and to him, this is all a game. But soon the game turns serious when he realizes that he's falling in love with her and the secrets they both keep are standing in the way.

== Cast ==
- Mariana Levy as Lupita López
- Eduardo Palomo as Alfredo Rochild/Carlos Pérez
- Rafael Inclán as Camilo López
- Irán Eory as Marcelina Ruvalcaba de Rochild
- Gabriela Goldsmith as Gladys de Rochild
- Laura Flores as Monica Rochild #1
- Lola Merino as Monica Rochild #2
- Angélica Rivera as Giovanna Carini
- Antonio De Carlo as Santiago Garrido
- Roberto Vander as Gregorio Rochild
- Elizabeth Aguilar as Lucía
- Roberto Ballesteros as Adolfo Molina
- Ricardo Cortez as Pietro Carini
- Claudia Ramírez as Rosa Fernández de García
- Fernando Ciangherotti as Federico Rochild
- Alfredo Alegría as Detective Benitez
- Alejandro Aragón as Osvaldo Frías
- Alexis Ayala as Carlos Pérez
- Karen Senties as Laura Sánchez
- Adrian Ramos as Detective Tellez
- Odiseo Bichir as Ignacio Martínez
- Roberto Huicoechea as Detective Colin
- Angélica Arvizu as Delfina
- Beatriz Ornelas as Dora
- Dacia Arcaráz as Susana
- Silvia Campos as Barbara
- Dina de Marco as Bertha
- Claudio Báez as Jaime Pérez
- Gerardo Gonzalez as Gomez
- Bertha del Castillo as Angela
- Diana Golden as Elvira Funes
- Nicky Mondellini as Gina Valdez
- Roberto Mateos as Florencio
- Irlanda Mora as Leonor de Carini
- Armando Palomo as José Zamora
- Jorge Pascual Rubio as Domingo
- Roxana Saucedo as Olivia
- Luis Guillermo Martell as Julio "Pollito" Zamora
- Marisol Centeno as Agustina "Nena" Martínez
- Ella Laboriel as Toña
- Claudia Ortega as Agustina
- Juan Carlos Casasola as Fausto Medrano
- Rafael del Villar as Lic. Argueyo
- Frances Ondiviela as Detective Altavaz
- David Ostrosky as Claudio Rendón
- Daniel Serrano as Raúl
- Sergio Sendel as Hugo
- René Muñoz as Dr. Lozano
- Anahí
- Mónika Sánchez
- Ariel López Padilla
- Rebeca Manríquez
- Rafael Velasco
- Itatí Cantoral
- Eva Garbo
- Sussan Taunton
- Nubia Marti
- Roberto Blandón
- Sara Montes
- Ricardo Vera

== Awards and nominations ==
Year	Award	Category	Nominee	Result
1992	10th TVyNovelas Awards	Best Leading Actress	Irán Eory	Won
1992	10th TVyNovelas Awards	Best Co-lead Actor	Rafael Inclán	Won
1992	10th TVyNovelas Awards	Best Young Lead Actress	Mariana Levy	Nominated
1992	10th TVyNovelas Awards	Best Young Lead Actor	Eduardo Palomo	Nominated
1992	10th TVyNovelas Awards	Best Child Performance	Luis Guillermo Martell	Won
1992	Latin ACE Awards	Television Revelation of the Year (Female)	Mariana Levy	Won
