= Thelma Dorantes =

Mexican actress (1949–2024)

- Born: September 30, 1949; Mexico City, Mexico
- Died: April 10, 2024 (aged 74); Mexico City, Mexico
- Known for: Television and theatre actress
- Notable work: Papá a toda madre' 'Mi corazón es tú' 'Muchachitas como tú' 'Una familia de diez' 'Al derecho y al Derbez'; Chespirito' 'La rosa de Guadalupe' 'Mujer, casos de la vida real' 'Como dice el dicho'

Thelma Emilia Dorantes y Pérez (30 September 1949 – 10 April 2024) was a prominent Mexican television and theatre actress with a career that spanned over four decades.

== Biography ==
Dorantes was born in 1949 and first began acting at age 17. She made her first professional television performance in Triángulo, and then appeared in Al derecho y al Derbez. Prior to her death she appeared in telenovelas Qué bonito amor, Quiero amarte, and Mi corazón es tuyo.

Dorantes died at home on 10 April 2024. Prior to her death, she had to cancel recent performances in "Amo su inocencia, 17 años" at the Casa del Indio Fernández theatre due to ill health. She was 76 years old.
