= Juan Ignacio Aranda =

Mexican actor (born 1962)

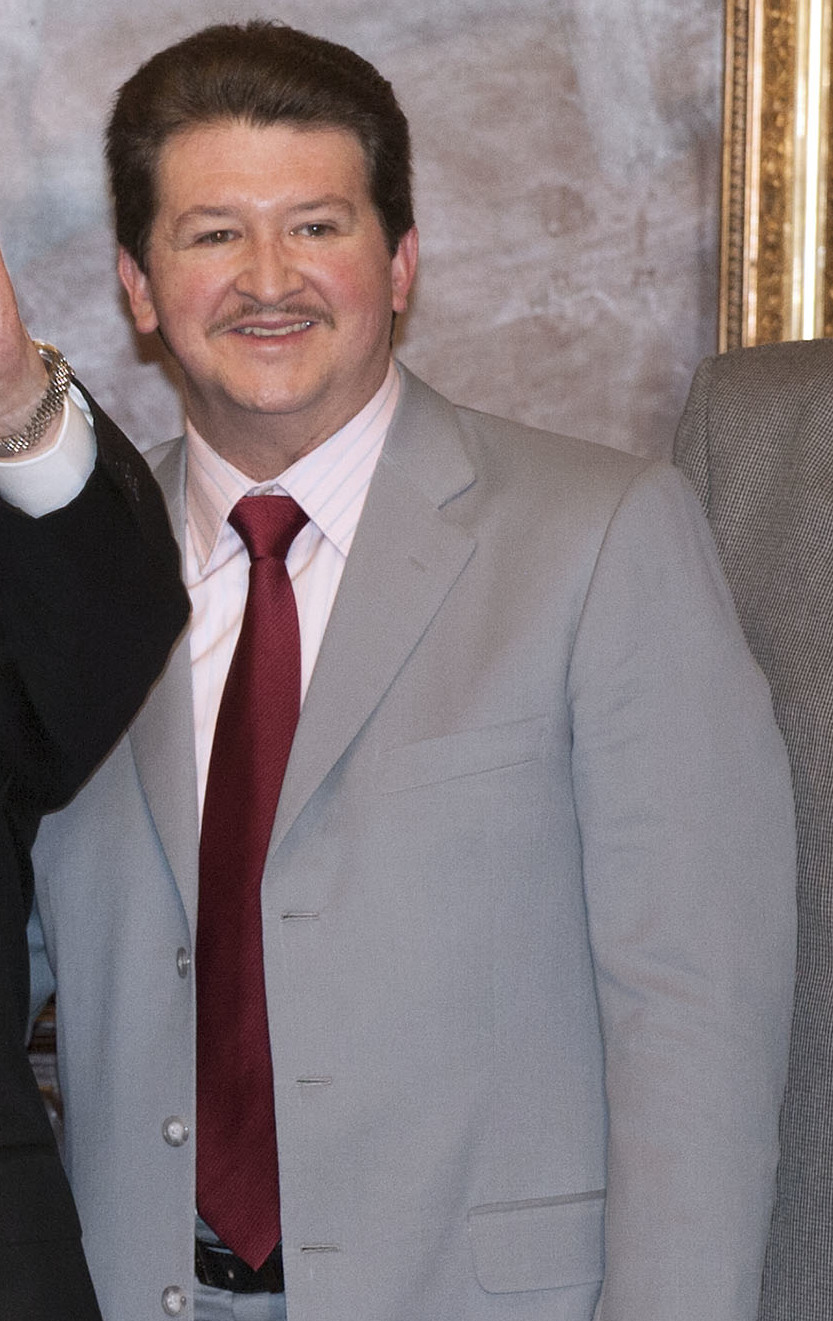
- Aranda in 2015
- Born: Juan Ignacio López Aranda; 6 February 1962 (age 63); Mexico City, Mexico
- Occupation: Actor
- Years active: 1981–present
- Children: 2
- Father: Ignacio López Tarso

Juan Ignacio Aranda (born Juan Ignacio López Aranda on February 6, 1962, in Mexico City, Mexico) is a Mexican actor. He began his training in 1978 in Centro de Arte Dramático (CADAC), also studied in The Cockpit Arts Workshop and in The City Lit (London), in Centro Universitario de Teatro of Universidad Nacional Autónoma de México (UNAM) and in United States International University in San Diego, California.

== Filmography ==
=== Film roles ===
Year	Title	Roles	Notes
1981	El color de nuestra piel	Héctor Torres	
1984	El otro	Luis / Alfredo Carvajal	
1986	Mission kill	Miguel	
1988	El secreto de la ouija	Tony	
1989	Erik el mercenario	Ricardo	
2002	El crimen del Padre Amaro	Chato Aguilar	
2010	Hidalgo: La historia jamás contada	José Quintana	
2012	Chiapas, el corazón del café	Monseñor	
2012	Morelos	Hermenegildo Galeana	
2014	Perfect Obedience	Father Galaviz	
2015	Apasionado Pancho Villa	Álvaro Obregón	
2015	Las Aparicio	Captain Asdrúbal Domínguez	
2016	Rumbos paralelos	Hospital Director	

=== Television roles ===
Year	Title	Roles	Notes
1984	Los años felices	Jorge	
1990	La fuerza del amor	Unknown role	
1992	Triángulo	Willy Linares	
1994	Imperio de cristal	Flavio	
1996	Canción de amor	Unknown role	
1997	Pueblo chico, infierno grande	Baldomero	
2000–2005	Mujer, casos de la vida real	Various roles	10 episodes
2002	Fidel	Alberto Bayo	Television film
2002	Entre el amor y el odio	Facundo	
2002	Así son ellas	Carlos	16 episodes
2003	De pocas, pocas pulgas	Julián Montes	
2003–2004	Mariana de la noche	Jorge Lozano	3 episodes
2005	La Madrastra	Juez de Aruba	2 episodes
2005	La esposa virgen	Dante	3 episodes
2008–2014	La rosa de Guadalupe	Various roles	8 episodes
2008–2009	El Pantera	Senador	5 episodes
2009–2010	Mar de amor	Fiscal	9 episodes
2010	Bienes raíces	Luis García	Episode: "Lotería de la fortuna"
2010	Capadocia	Flavio	Episode: "Y resucitó al tercer día"
2011	El encanto del águila	Félix Díaz	3 episodes
2012–2013	Porque el amor manda	Máximo Valtierra	Recurring role; 40 episodes
2013–2018	Como dice el dicho	Various roles	9 episodes
2013–2016	El Señor de los Cielos	Ramiro Silva de la Garza	Series regular (seasons 1, 3–4); 128 episodes
2016	Dios Inc.	Antonio Mondragón	Recurring role; 8 episodes
2016–2017	El Chema	Ramiro Silva de la Garza	Series regular (season 1); 24 episodes
2018	Run Coyote Run	Gobernador	Episodes: "La iglesia tiene cura" and "La boda presidencial"
2019	This Is Silvia Pinal	Miguel Contreras Torres	Episode: "Soy mamá"
2019	El Dragón: Return of a Warrior	Zaragoza	Series regular
