= Perfect Obedience =

2014 Mexican film directed by Luis Urquiza

- Theatrical release poster
- Directed by: Luis Urquiza
- Written by: Luis Urquiza; Ernesto Alcocer
- Produced by: Daniel Birman Ripstein; Lourdes Garcia; Georgina Terán; Luis Urquiza
- Cinematography: Serguei Saldívar Tanaka
- Edited by: Jorge Macaya
- Music by: Alejandro Giacomán
- Production company: Astillero Films
- Release date: May 1, 2014
- Running time: 99 minutes
- Country: Mexico
- Language: Spanish

Perfect Obedience (Spanish: Obediencia perfecta) is a 2014 Mexican drama film directed by Luis Urquiza and based around the controversies surrounding the Legionarios de Cristo religious congregation and its founder Marcial Maciel. It won the Grand Prix des Amériques, the main prize at the Montreal World Film Festival.

== Cast ==
- Juan Manuel Bernal: Padre Ángel de la Cruz (based on Marcial Maciel)
- Alfonso Herrera: Julián 'Sacramento' Santos (adult)
  - Sebastián Aguirre Boëda: Julián 'Sacramento' Santos (child)
- Juan Ignacio Aranda: Padre Galaviz
- Luis Ernesto Franco: Padre Robles
- Miguel Ángel Loyo: Andrés Lomelí
- Lucia González de León: Serva di Cristo
- Juan Carlos Colombo: Padre Ángel de la Cruz (elderly)
