= Mapita Cortés =

Puerto Rican actress (1939–2006)

- Cortés (left) with her husband Lucho Gatica
- Born: Maria del Pilar Mercado Cordero; August 4, 1939; San Juan, Puerto Rico
- Died: January 1, 2006 (aged 66); Mexico City, Mexico
- Occupations: Actress and model
- Children: Luis Gatica, Mapy (Maria del Pilar), Aída, Juanita, and Alfredo

Mapita Cortés (August 4, 1939 – January 1, 2006 born Maria del Pilar Mercado Cordero in 1939 in the Santurce barrio of San Juan, Puerto Rico – died in Mexico City), was a Puerto Rican-American actress and model. She was the mother of Mexican actor Luis Gatica, the wife of Lucho Gatica, the niece of actress Mapy Cortés, and the niece in law of actor Fernando Cortés. She was also the cousin of famous Paquito Cordero, who was two years her junior.

In 1958, Cortés debuted as an actress in Misterios de Ultratumba, later appearing in 11 films. Her last role was in the telenovela Mi pequeña Soledad, where she played the character of "Blanquita". Cortés died on January 1, 2006, due to cancer.

== Biography ==
Cortés was Miss Puerto Rico in the 1957 Miss Universe pageant and won Miss Congeniality. It was the first time that a representative from Puerto Rico won this award.

Mapita Cortés had demonstrated desire to become an actress since she was a child. As she and her cousin grew, her cousin became a known personality in Puerto Rico. Mapita Cortés, however, tried her luck in Mexico, since her aunt had adopted her and was a celebrity there. Mapita Cortés took her last name from her uncle and aunt.

Cortés became a sensation in the Mexican film industry during the 1950s, when she appeared in 1958's Misterios de Ultratumba ("Mysteries of the Afterlife", aka The Black Pit of Dr. M). This movie became a contemporary Mexican classic.

Cortés then starred or played important roles in a number of films, following her uncle and aunt's footsteps by becoming a celebrity on her own in Mexico. She decided to establish herself in the North American country permanently after enjoying success there.

While she was doing films, another celebrity, Chilean singer Lucho Gatica, fell in love with her and the two began a romance that would lead to a marriage on May 21, 1960. They had five children: Luis, Mapy (Maria del Pilar), Aída, Juanita, and Alfredo. Their son Luis Gatica (born in 1961), would eventually also become a celebrity as a telenovela actor and rock music singer during the 1980s. Mapita Cortés and Lucho Gatica divorced after 18 years of marriage.

After marrying Lucho Gatica, Mapita Cortés semi-retired from the world of show business, becoming a housewife instead and attending to her children. But she returned to activity sporadically, becoming what is known as a character actress in some of Mexico's most famous telenovelas. In 1989, she participated alongside Verónica Castro in Televisa's Mi pequeña Soledad, which became a major hit across Mexico, the United States and even Europe, giving Mapita Cortés a degree of celebrity in countries like Russia and others. Mapita Cortés also had the opportunity to work alongside Mariana Levy, who died in 2005.

== Films ==
- Vacaciones en Acapulco (1961)
- Poker de reinas (1960)
- Dormitorio para señoritas (1960)
- Variedades de medianoche (1960)
- Escuela de verano (1959)
- Misterios de ultratumba (1959) as Patricia Aldama
- Señoritas (1959)
- La edad de la tentación (1959)
- Tres lecciones de amor (1959)
- A Thousand and One Nights (1958)
- Los tres vivales (1958)

== Telenovelas ==
- Mi pequeña Soledad (1990) as Blanquita
- Marionetas (1986)
- Yo no pedí vivir (1977)
- Pensión de mujeres (1960)

== See also ==
- List of Puerto Ricans
- Foreign-born artists in Mexico
