= Caminos cruzados =

Mexican telenovela

- Genre: Telenovela
- Created by: José Antônio de Souza
- Written by: Silvia Gutierrez; Maria Chacon; Ricardo Tejeda
- Directed by: Herval Rossano
- Starring: Mariana Levy; Ariel López Padilla; Margarita Gralia; Roberto Vander; Carmen Amezcua; Octavio Galindo; Rosa María Bianchi
- Opening theme: Te amo by Dulce
- Country of origin: Mexico
- Original language: Spanish
- No. of episodes: 68

Production
- Executive producer: Herval Rossano
- Production locations: Mexico City, Mexico
- Running time: 41–44 minutes
- Production company: Televisa

Original release
- Network: Canal de las Estrellas
- Release: December 5, 1994 – April 12, 1995

Related
- María José (18:30); María José (19:30) Bajo un mismo rostro (18:30); Todo o nada (1986)

Caminos cruzados (English title: Crossroads) is a Mexican telenovela produced by Herval Rossano for Televisa in 1994.

Mariana Levy and Ariel López Padilla starred as protagonists, while Margarita Gralia starred as main antagonist.

== Plot ==
Patricia is a sensitive and intelligent woman who starts working in the firm Ambrosio and César Augusto (father and son). Both fall in love with her, but César Augusto breaks up with his girlfriend, Valeria, and marries Patricia. During their honeymoon, he goes missing and is presumed dead. However, César Augusto is still alive and in the hospital in the United States. He marries another woman, Monica, and eventually returns to Mexico, where his path will once again cross Patricia's. However, things take an even wilder turn when Patricia becomes romantically involved with Ambrosio, creating an unforgettable father/son rivalry.

== Cast ==
- Mariana Levy as Patricia Álvarez
- Ariel López Padilla as César Augusto Jiménez y Cisneros
- Margarita Gralia as Emma Ulloa de Jiménez y Cisneros, villain
- Roberto Vander as Ambrosio Jiménez y Cisneros
- Carmen Amezcua as Mónica Valle de García, villain
- Octavio Galindo as Pedro Álvarez
- Rosa María Bianchi as Alicia "Licha" Fernández de Álvarez
- Javier Gómez as Mario Santander
- Isabel Andrade as Celia Álvarez de Soles
- Odiseo Bichir as Orlando Soles
- Héctor Cruz Lara as Reynaldo Álvarez
- Norma Lazareno as Gigi Dumont
- Tania Helfgott as Valeria Dumont
- Arath de la Torre as Rubén Soles
- Eduardo Rivera as Diego Aranda
- Gerardo Murguía as Manuel Burgos-Ulloa
- Maricruz Nájera as Elsa
- Dacia Arcaráz as Marilú
- Laura Forastieri as Gaby Morales
- Luis Javier as Leoncio Salazar
- Gastón Tuset as Dr. Steve Miller
- Mercedes Molto as Jacqueline "Jackie"
- Martha Navarro as Silvia Márquez
- Raquel Pankowsky as Inés Fernández
- David Rencoret as Rafael Morales Díaz
- Lucy Tovar as Rocío Navarro
- Eva Prado as Julia Aragón
- Monserrat Gallosa as Elenita Álvarez
- Regina Torné as Katya
- Ricardo Blume as Olegario Noguere
- Hilda Aguirre as Lilia
- Mónika Sánchez as Lucía
- Vanessa Angers as Odette
- Janet Pineda as Anita Valle
- Marcos Valdés as Carlos Marchand
- Raúl Azkenazi as Pérez
- Mario Carballido as Juan Eduardo Linares
- Janet Ruiz as Sandra Espinoza
- Paulina Lazareno as Marisol
- Claudia Abrego as Jennifer
- Bárbara Córcega as Dulce María
- Clara María Diar as Luisa Aranda
- Surya MacGregor as Olga Burgos
- Eric del Castillo as Roberto
- Patricia Lukin as Rosita
- Claudia Cañedo as Juanita
- Carlos Espinoza as José
- Teo Tapia as Gerardo
- Ricardo Vera as Ramírez
- Anita Klesky as a Nurse
- Rolando Valenzuela
- John Knuckey
- David Guzmán
- Renato Munster
- Claudia Campos
- Graciela Estrada
- Francisco Fandino
- Rubén Morales
- Mario Prudomme
- Darwin Solano
- Nelson Velázquez
- Elías Rubio
- Manuel Benitez
