= Alan (Mexican singer) =

Mexican singer with the band Magneto

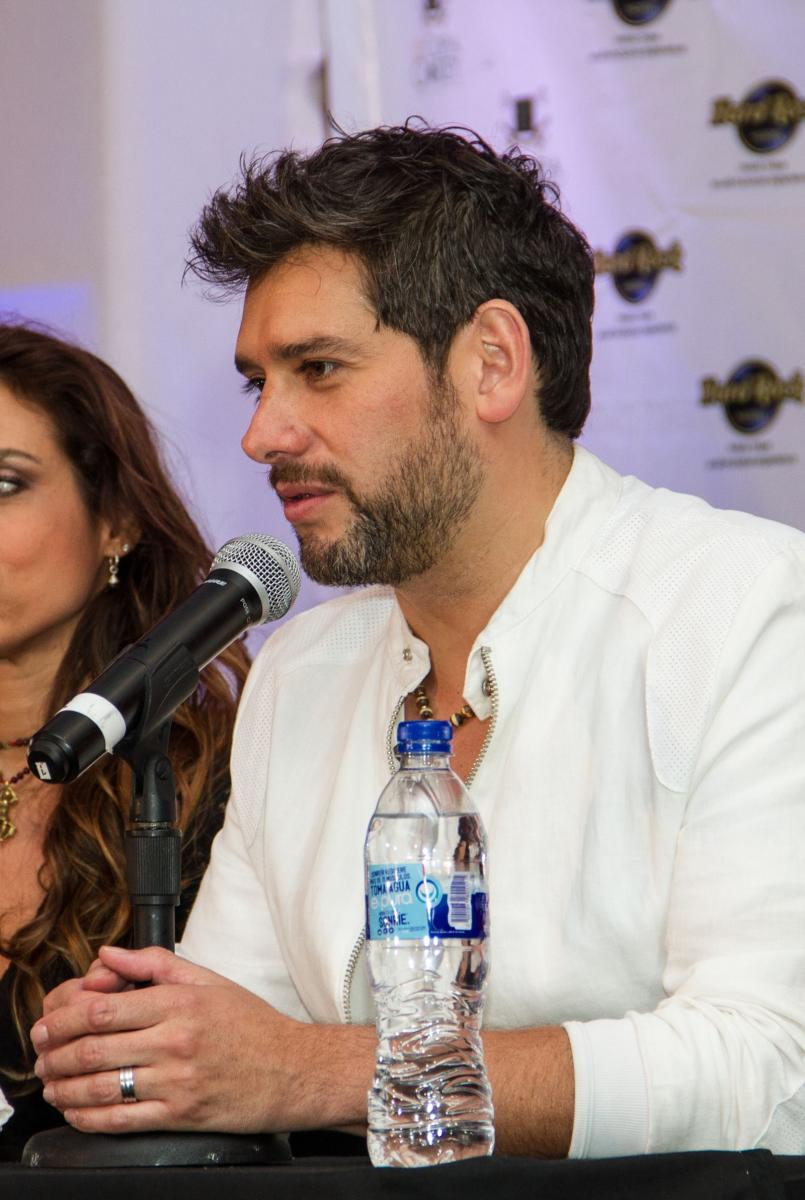
Photo of Alan

Erick Ibarra Miramontes (born June 28, 1972), known by his stage name Alan or Alan Ibarra, is a Mexican singer, songwriter, and actor. He was born on June 28, 1972, in Mexico City, Mexico. He is best known as one of the members and lead vocalist of the Mexican boy band Magneto.

He sang with Magneto during the 1980s and 1990s. he also acted in several Televisa soap operas and television series in the 2000s. He is currently touring with the Mexican band.

== Career ==
=== Singer career ===
He began his artistic career early at the age of 10, as a participant in the television program Juguemos a cantar (1983), participating in the album Segundo Festival Juguemos A Cantar where he performed the song Ha salido el sol.

In 1989, Alan Ibarra joined the Mexican band Magneto when they signed a contract with CBS Records. The boy band was preparing to record their fourth album, 40 grados. Two members left the group, and this is when Charlie and Alan Ibarra joined. Recently, Elías Cervantes, a member of the original 1983 lineup, shared an anecdote claiming that Alan's addition to the group was a condition of the negotiations with the new label.

In 1990, Magneto released their fifth studio album, Vuela, Vuela. With this release, Alan Ibarra and his bandmates gained international recognition. Ibarra was the lead vocalist on three of the album's seven promotional singles: La puerta del colegio, Para siempre, and Vuela, Vuela. The latter is a Spanish adaptation of the 1986 French hit Voyage, voyage, originally performed by pop singer Desireless. The song was written by Dominique Albert Jacques Dubois and Jean-Michel Rivat, with the Spanish lyrics adapted by Mikel Herzog. Although the group initially opposed recording the song, Ibarra ultimately volunteered to provide the lead vocals. This album enabled them to participate on February 12, 1992, in the XXXIII Viña del Mar International Song Festival.

In 1992, Alan and his bandmates made their acting debut with the film Cambiando el destino, written and directed by Gilberto de Anda, produced by Gabriela Aragón and starring Elías Cervantes, Mauri (Marcos Stern Chernovetzky), Álex (Hugo de la Barreda) and Alan. This 90-minute film was produced by Televicine S.A. de C.V.

In 1996, Magneto released Siempre, a compilation album that included new songs such as Corazón Perfecto, No Sé decir adiós, Obsesión and A corazón Abierto. Following this release, the band embarked on a farewell tour while the members pursued solo careers. Alan Ibarra had already signed a contract with Sony Music for a solo album, which was released three years later.

Alan Ibarra's first album was released to the market by Sony Music Entertainment México, S.A. De C.V. on September 28, 1999, under the title Alan Azul. It was produced by KC Porter, who is known for producing for artists such as Ana Gabriel, Daniela Romo, Ednita Nazario, Selena, Ricky Martin, and Santana. Five promotional singles were released from this album: El aire que me das, Volveré, volverás, Como un violín, Lluvia, and Si pudieras volar. For this album, he received the ERES Award for Best Debut of the Year.

In 2001, Alan Ibarra reunited with his former Magneto bandmates to form XMagneto, releasing the single "Una y Otra Vez". Due to legal issues regarding the rights to the band's original name, trademarked by their former manager Toño Berumen, they performed under the name XMagneto for the rest of that year. The group released a self-titled album and embarked on a reunion tour, with their last concert taking place on September 8, 2001.

In 2001 he released his second solo album Mi realidad through Epic Records. The songs were produced by Loris Ceroni and recorded at Le Dune Studio, Italy. The album has 14 songs, in which Alan participated as a writer in ten of them. The promotional singles from this production were Prendiendo Fuego and ¿Cual es el camino?

In October 2009, Alan Ibarra reunited with the original members of Magneto to commemorate the band's 25th anniversary with the "Para Siempre" reunion tour. The lineup featured Elías Cervantes, Mauri Stern, Hugo de la Barreda (Álex), Alan Ibarra, and Tono Beltranena. The tour began on October 9, 2009 at the Auditorio Nacional in Mexico City, where they performed iconic hits such as "Vuela, vuela", "Para siempre", and "La puerta del colegio". They also performed updated versions of selected songs, including a new version of "Para siempre", which began playing on the radio shortly before the start of the tour.

Elías Cervantes emphasized that the tour was intended to provide a nostalgic experience for fans rather than compete with contemporary artists or achieve substantial financial gains. Ticket prices were intentionally kept affordable to ensure greater accessibility. While there were no plans for an album of new material, the group considered producing a DVD or live album capturing performances from the tour, both nationally and possibly internationally. Additionally, their relationship with their former manager Toño Berumen remained friendly, allowing them to use the name "Magneto" without legal complications during this reunion.

In 2016, Alan Ibarra joined Magneto for the Juntos por Ti tour, a collaboration with Mercurio that brought both bands together for a series of concerts across Mexico and Latin America. The tour began at the Auditorio Nacional in Mexico City and, following its success, expanded internationally.

In September 2016, Magneto and Mercurio performed in the United States, with shows at The Aztec Theatre in San Antonio, Texas, on September 8, and at The Joint in Las Vegas, Nevada, on September 16. As part of this project, they released a live album, Magneto & Mercurio Live, capturing highlights from the tour. The album received a Gold certification.

In 2017, Alan, along with his bandmates from Magneto, was part of Únete a la Fiesta, a tour that included other prominent groups and artists from the 90s, Kabah, Sentidos Opuestos, Moenia and Magneto & Mercurio, offering joint performances and special collaborations. From this tour came the album Únete a la Fiesta (Live).

In 2018, together with Magneto, they joined the third stage of the 90s Pop Tour, sharing the stage with groups such as OV7, JNS and Kabah, among others, bringing their classics to a new generation of fans.

In 2019, Alan participated in the Mexican reality show ¿Quién es la máscara? under the character of Minotauro.

In 2021, they participated in the fourth stage of this tour, sharing the stage with artists such as JNS, Erik Rubín, Sentidos Opuestos, Ana Torroja, Lynda, Kabah and Benny.

In 2023, although the show's rules prohibit the same person from appearing twice, Alan appeared again on Who's the Mask? This time alongside the rest of the Magneto lineup.

He is currently engaged in all of the band's activities. On a personal level, in February 2025, Alan was criticized due to his performance on stage. His fellow members revealed that Alan is going through severe depression, which has affected his energy during performances. The group asked for empathy and understanding from the public and the media in this situation.

=== Acting career ===
Between 2000 and 2001 he made his debut in the Televisa soap opera Rayito de Luz, where he played Abel Ventura, a musician who aspires to be a priest. He flees the city after a heartbreak and seeks inner peace and a life dedicated to God. In the convent, he discovers a newborn abandoned at the door, who they later call Juan de Luz, but who they affectionately call Rayito de Luz. Alan commented that his appearance on the album Alan Azul wearing a blue garment that made him look like a priest was fundamental for the producers of the telenovela to choose him for the role of the young seminarian. In addition to his participation in the leading role, Alan participated in the soundtrack of the telenovela, published by Fonovisa, being the voice in 8 of the 13 songs that make up the album, among them Amor De Luz, from his debut album.

In 2002 he participated as one of the twelve members of the reality show Gran Hermano VIP. And in 2003 he participated in the soap opera Velo de novia where he played the character Isaac Carvajal.

During 2003/2004 he participated in an episode of CLAP, El Lugar de tus Sueños. That same year, 2004, he appeared in 2 episodes of Hospital El Paisa, where he played Dr. Vasconcelos. In 2005 he participated in the Mexican soap opera El amor no tiene precio, produced by Alfredo Schwarz for Televisa and Univision, in co-production with Fonovideo. In it he played Víctor Manuel Prado.

== Personal life ==
He has one sister and went to New York City and Rome to perfect his singing and acting. His nickname is "Robocop".

== Filmography ==
=== Film ===
- Cambiando el destino (1992) — Himself

=== Television roles ===
Year	Title	Role	Notes
2000	Rayito de luz	Abel	Main role
2003	Velo de novia	Isaac	
2004	Hospital El paisa	Dr. Vasconcelos	
2005-2006	El amor no tiene precio	Victor Manuel Prado	
2009	Alma Indomable	Alberto "Beto" Ocampo	
