= Cadenas de amargura =

Mexican telenovela

- Genre: Telenovela
- Created by: Cuauhtémoc Blanco; María del Carmen Peña
- Directed by: Luis Vélez
- Starring: Diana Bracho; Daniela Castro; Delia Casanova; Raymundo Capetillo; Tina Romero; Cynthia Klitbo; Hilda Aguirre; Raúl Araiza
- Country of origin: Mexico
- Original language: Spanish
- No. of episodes: 80

Production
- Executive producer: Carlos Sotomayor
- Producer: Rafael Urióstegui
- Cinematography: Luis Miguel Barona; Carlos Guerra Villarreal
- Production company: Televisa

Original release
- Network: Canal de las Estrellas
- Release: January 1 – April 24, 1991

Related
- En nombre del amor

Cadenas de amargura (English title: Chains of Bitterness) is a Mexican telenovela produced by Carlos Sotomayor for Televisa in 1991.

The story revolves around Cecilia (Daniela Castro), a beautiful young girl, who, upon the death of her parents, is forced to live with her two spinster aunts, Natalia (Delia Casanova) and Evangelina (Diana Bracho), in the city of Guanajuato, where both are highly respected for their ancestry and morality.

The series stars Diana Bracho, Daniela Castro, Delia Casanova, Raymundo Capetillo, Tina Romero, Cynthia Klitbo, Hilda Aguirre and Raúl Araiza.

== Plot ==
Cecilia (Daniela Castro) is a beautiful young girl, who, upon the death of her parents, is forced to live with her two spinster aunts, Natalia (Delia Casanova) and Evangelina (Diana Bracho), in the city of Guanajuato, where both are highly respected for their ancestry and morality.

Natalia is excessively affectionate and understanding, while her sister, Evangelina, is extremely repressive and authoritarian, in addition to possessing the leadership within the family; therefore, she has to be granted total obedience, which causes Cecilia not to live her youth naturally.

Fortunately for her, Cecilia has a friend who becomes her only contact with external reality; this is Sofía (Cynthia Klitbo), a schoolmate of the same age, but with an open and free perspective on life. Over the years, a strong bond of friendship and trust has been established between the two young women, despite Evangelina's opposition.

This friendship seems indestructible, until the appearance of Gerardo (Raúl Araiza), a handsome young man, who is initially attracted to Sofía while Cecilia only inspires him a little pity. But over time, Gerardo's feelings change, until his pity ends up turning into deep love, which will cause Sofía to break their ties of friendship and become a terrible enemy for the couple.

== Cast ==
=== Main ===
- Diana Bracho as Evangelina
- Daniela Castro as Cecilia
  - Karen Beatriz as Child Cecilia
- Delia Casanova as Natalia
- Raymundo Capetillo as Renato
- Tina Romero as Martha
- Cynthia Klitbo as Sofía
  - Priscila Reyes as Child Sofía
- Hilda Aguirre as Elena
- Raúl Araiza as Gerardo

=== Recurring and guest stars ===
- Alexis Ayala as Víctor
- Luis Cárdenas as Salvador
- Bolívar Hack as Roberto
- Raúl Magaña as Joaquín
- Aurora Molina as Jovita
- Roberto Montiel as Felipe
- Marcela Páez as Sister Angélica
- Raquel Pankowsky as Inés
- Ivette Proal as Elsa
- Gilberto Román as Manuel Alejo
- Cecilia Romo as Chief Nun
- Miguel Córcega as Father José María
- Fernando Luján as Father Julio

== Awards and nominations ==
Year	Award	Category	Nominee(s)	Result
1992	TVyNovelas Awards	Best Telenovela	Carlos Sotomayor	Won
1992	TVyNovelas Awards	Best Actress	Diana Bracho	Won
1992	TVyNovelas Awards	Best Antagonist Actress	Cynthia Klitbo	Won
1992	TVyNovelas Awards	Best Leading Actor	Fernando Luján	Nominated
1992	TVyNovelas Awards	Best Co-lead Actress	Delia Casanova	Won
1992	TVyNovelas Awards	Best Co-lead Actress	Tina Romero	Nominated
1992	TVyNovelas Awards	Best Supporting Actress	Aurora Molina	Nominated
1992	TVyNovelas Awards	Best Supporting Actor	Raymundo Capetillo	Nominated
1992	TVyNovelas Awards	Best Young Lead Actress	Daniela Castro	Won
1992	TVyNovelas Awards	Best Young Lead Actor	Raúl Araiza	Won
1992	TVyNovelas Awards	Best Revelation	Alexis Ayala	Nominated
1992	TVyNovelas Awards	Best Direction	Luis Vélez	Won
1992	TVyNovelas Awards	Best Direction of the Cameras	Carlos Guerra Villarreal	Won
1992	Latin ACE Awards	Best Actress	Diana Bracho	Won
