= La última esperanza =

Mexican telenovela

- Genre: Telenovela; Romance; Drama
- Directed by: Alfredo Gurrola
- Starring: Mariana Levy; Alberto Mayagoitia; Pedro Armendáriz, Jr. Salvador Sánchez; Cecilia Gabriela; Luis Gatica; Elsa Cárdenas
- Opening theme: Ay amor by Mariana Levy
- Country of origin: Mexico
- Original language: Spanish
- No. of episodes: 150

Production
- Executive producer: Eugenio Cobo
- Running time: 41-44 minutes
- Production company: Televisa

Original release
- Network: Canal de las Estrellas
- Release: February 1 – May 14, 1993

Related
- Ángeles sin paraíso; Sueño de amor; Muñeca (1974)

La última esperanza (English title: The last hope) is a Mexican telenovela produced by Eugenio Cobo for Televisa in 1993.

Mariana Levy and Alberto Mayagoitia starred as protagonists, while Pedro Armendáriz, Jr, Cecilia Gabriela, Florencia Ferret, Adalberto Parra and Jesús Arriaga starred as antagonists.

== Plot ==
"La Última Esperanza" is a slum home to poor hardworking people and dishonest criminals alike. The protagonist Estelita is a young woman who resides here with her depressive and alcoholic father, working tirelessly to support them both after the death of her mother. One day Estelita meets Daniel, a young millionaire playboy who inherited his fortune - including the land where the slum is located - from his deceased parents. In order to win over Estelita, Daniel decides to go undercover as Angel, a poor young man from the slum. Meanwhile, Daniel's wealthy industrialist uncle Alejandro is working behind his back in shady business deals to steal the land from his nephew and develop it into a lucrative residential area.

== Cast ==
- Mariana Levy as Estelita
- Alberto Mayagoitia as Daniel Burana/Ángel Pérez
- Pedro Armendáriz, Jr. as Alejandro Burana
- Salvador Sánchez as Pancho
- Cecilia Gabriela as Jennifer Lascuráin
- Luis Gatica as José
- Elsa Cárdenas as Ninfa
- Miguel Pizarro as Father Juan Lamparero
- Jaime Lozano as "El Gallo"
- Héctor Ortega as Don Moy
- Jesús Arriaga as Manuel Prieto "El Piraña"
- Coco Levy as Pablo
- Juan Carlos Serrán as Mariano
- Eugenio Cobo as Sócrates
- José Suárez as Luis Ceballos "El Caireles"
- Carolina Guerrero as Polita Ríos
- Patricia Hernández as Gloria Chávez
- Adalberto Parra as Fraga
- Bárbara Gil as Isabel
- Silvia Suárez as Diana
- Florencia Ferret as Nora
- Héctor Parra as Tte. Ramos
- Rosita Pelayo as Melanie
- Klaus Feldman as Jacobo
- Jorge Páez as "Kid Acero"
- Azela Robinson
- Violeta Isfel
- Jorge Alberto Bolaños
- Juan David Burns
- Yula Pozo
- Azucena Rodríguez
- Carlos Amador
- Francois Clemencau
- Carlos Chavira
- Esteban Escarcega
- Maripaz García
- Janina Hidalgo
- María Morena
- Baltazar Oviedo
- Evelyn Solares
- Edmundo Lima
- Juan Antonio Llanes
- Lorena Martínez
- Rubén Monterrubio
