= Amor de nadie =

- Genre: Telenovela
- Created by: Eric Vonn
- Written by: Eric Vonn; Marcia del Río
- Directed by: Miguel Córcega; Mónica Miguel
- Starring: Lucía Méndez; Fernando Sáenz; Fernando Allende; Bertín Osborne; Saúl Lisazo
- Opening theme: Amor de nadie by Lucía Méndez
- Country of origin: Mexico
- Original language: Spanish
- No. of episodes: 199

Production
- Executive producer: Carla Estrada
- Production locations: Mexico City, Mexico; Seville, Spain; Paris, France
- Cinematography: Alejandro Frutos; Isabel Basurto
- Running time: 21-22 minutes
- Production company: Televisa

Original release
- Network: Canal de las Estrellas
- Release: September 10, 1990 – June 14, 1991

Related
- Yo compro esa mujer; Al filo de la muerte

Amor de nadie (English title: Nobody's Love) is a Mexican telenovela produced by Carla Estrada for Televisa in 1990.

Lucía Méndez starred as protagonist, together with Fernando Sáenz, Fernando Allende, Bertín Osborne and Saúl Lisazo.

== Cast ==
=== Main ===
- Lucía Méndez as Sofía
- Fernando Sáenz as Edmundo
- Fernando Allende as Guillermo
- Bertín Osborne as Óscar
- Saúl Lisazo as Luis

=== Recurring ===
- Susana Alexander as Julieta
- Aurora Alonso as Terencia
- César Balcazar as Federico
- Rozenda Bernal as Evangelina
- Roberto Blandón as Carlos
- Roberto Bonet as Rodolfo
- Olivia Bucio as Lena
- Arsenio Campos as Jesús
- Ada Carrasco as Cony
- Fernando Casanova as Alberto
- Aurora Clavel as Bertha
- Bárbara Córcega as Emma
- Mario García González as Ramírez
- Nadia Haro Oliva as Marie
- Lily Inclán as Adriana
- José Juan as El Coronel
- Magda Karina as Elisa
- Elizabeth Katz as Ivette
- Rodolfo Landa as Sergio
- Lupita Lara as Amelia
- Arturo Lorca as Pepe
- Irma Lozano as Betty
- Alejandra Maldonado as Vera
- Isabel Martínez as Laureana
- Patricia Martínez as Zenaida
- Mónica Miguel as Socorro
- Mimí as Perla
- Yolanda Ventura as Astrid
- Alicia Montoya as Anna
- Gloria Morell as Julita
- Raquel Morell as Gilda
- Lucha Moreno as Almendra
- José Elías Moreno as Jorge
- Bertha Moss as Victoria
- Adalberto Parra as Baltazar
- Angelina Peláez as Chana
- Patricia Pereyra as Sabrina
- Miguel Pizarro as Pablo
- Mónica Prado as Cinthia
- Germán Robles as Velarmino
- Javier Ruán as Renato
- Margarita Sanz as Maggi
- Anna Silvetti as Nancy
- Teo Tapia as Ramiro
- Blanca Torres as Santa
- Rosario Zúñiga as Marcelina
- Joaquín Cordero as Raúl
