= Raúl Araiza =

Mexican actor and television presenter (born 1964)

- Born: Raúl Araiza Herrera; 14 November 1964 (age 61); Mexico City, Mexico
- Occupations: Actor, TV presenter
- Years active: 1975–present
- Children: 2 daughters
- Parent(s): Raúl Araiza (deceased); Norma Herrera
- Relatives: Armando Araiza (brother)

Raúl Araiza (Spanish pronunciation: [raˈul aˈɾajsa]; born Raúl Araiza Herrera, 14 November 1964) is a Mexican actor and television presenter.

He studied drama in the Centro de Educación Artística of Televisa.

== Filmography ==
Telenovelas, films, TV presenter
Year	Title	Role	Notes
1975	El milagro de vivir		Guest star
1984	La traición	Cristóbal Guerra	Supporting role
1984	El sinvergüenza		Film
1988	Don't Panic	Robert	Film
1988	The Blue Iguana		Film
1988	Día de muertos		Film
1988	El placer de la venganza		Film
1988-89	Nuevo amanecer	Esteban	Main role
1989	Giron de niebla	Roberto	Film
1989	Pesadilla sin fin		Film
1990	Viernes trágico		Film
1990	Asesino silencioso		Film
1990	Venganza diabólica		Film
1991	Sólo para audaces		Film
1991	Orgia de sangre		Film
1991	Hacer el amor con otro		Film
1991	Un hombre despiadado		Film
1991	El regreso de la muerte		Film
1991	Cadenas de amargura	Gerardo Garza Osuna	Lead role
1991-92	Al filo de la muerte	Marcial Duboa	Supporting role
1992	Supervivencia		Film
1992	Relaciones violentas		Film
1992	Persecución mortal		Film
1992	Modelo antiguo	Gabriel Rivadeneira	Film
1993	En espera de la muerte		Film
1993	Hades, vida después de la muerte		Film
1993	Contrabando de esmeraldas	Válvula	Film
1993	Juventud en drogas	Arturo Fuentes	Film
1993	Los temerarios		Film
1994	Duelo final		Film
1994	Seducción judicial		Film
1995	Altos instintos		Film
1995	Viva San Isidro	Catarino	Film
1995	Mujeres infieles	Ricardo	Film
1995-96	Retrato de familia	Diego Corona	Main role
1996	Azul	Javier Valverde	Supporting role
1996	La culpa	Miguel Nava	Lead role
1996	Bonita		Film
1997	Fuga de almoloya		Film
1997	Destino traidor		Film
1997	Abuso en el rancho		Film
1997	Amor en tiempos de coca		Film
1997-98	María Isabel	Andrés	Supporting role
1998	Carros robados		Film
1998	Con mis propias manos		Film
1998	El último narco del cartel de Juárez		Film
1998	Loco corazón		Film
1998	Gotita de amor	Guillermo Contreras	Supporting role
1999	Cholos malditos		Film
1999	Cómplices criminales		Film
1999	A medias tintas		Film
2000	Religion, la fuerza de la costumbre		Film
2000	Locura de amor	Iván Quintana	
2000-01	Carita de Ángel	Arturo	Guest star
2001	Soy un hijo de la madrugada		Film
2001-02	El juego de la vida	Ezequiel Domínguez	Main role
2003-04	Clap, el lugar de tus sueños	Gregorio	Supporting role
2004	Cancionera		
2004	Mi verdad	Juan Osorio	Film
2006	Duelo de Pasiones		Guest star
2006-08	Amor mío	Marcos Sinclair	Lead role
2008-present	Hoy	Himself/TV presenter	
2008-09	Un gancho al corazón	Roberto "Beto" Ochoa "El fantasma vengador"	Main role
2009-present	Miembros al aire	Himself/TV presenter	
2009-10	Yoo sí vooy	Himself/TV presenter	
2010	TV Millones	Himself/TV presenter	
2017-2018	Papá a toda madre	Toño Barrientos	Main role
2021	La desalmada	Luis Vazquez	Supporting role
2023	¡Chócalas Compayito!	Zacarías Fernández	Main role

== Awards and nominations ==
Year	Award	Category	Telenovela	Result
1992	Premios TVyNovelas	Best Young Lead Actor	Cadenas de amargura	Won
1996	Premios TVyNovelas	Best Co-star Actor	Retrato de familia	Nominated
2007	Premios TVyNovelas	Best Male Star in Comedy	Amor mío	Nominated
2010	Premios TVyNovelas	Best Co-star Actor	Un gancho al corazón	Won
