= Triángulo (TV series) =

- Genre: Telenovela
- Created by: María Zarattini
- Written by: María Zarattini; Irma Ramos
- Directed by: Arturo Ripstein; Sergio Muñoz
- Starring: Daniela Castro; Eduardo Palomo; Guillermo García Cantú; Patricia Reyes Spíndola; Enrique Lizalde; Julieta Egurrola; Humberto Elizondo
- Opening theme: Entre tú y yo by Chantal Andere
- Country of origin: Mexico
- Original language: Spanish
- No. of episodes: 80

Production
- Executive producer: Ernesto Alonso
- Producer: Guadalupe Cuevas
- Cinematography: Víctor Soto; Sergio Muñoz
- Running time: 41-44 minutes
- Production company: Televisa

Original release
- Network: El Canal de las Estrellas
- Release: August 3 – November 20, 1992

Triángulo (English: Triangle) is a Mexican telenovela directed by Arturo Ripstein and Sergio Muñoz and produced by Ernesto Alonso for Televisa in 1992.

Daniela Castro and Eduardo Palomo starred as protagonists, while Kenia Gazcón, Guillermo García Cantú and Patricia Reyes Spíndola starred as antagonists.

== Plot ==
Sara is a naive and docile young woman who lives with her father Salvador, who is married to Virginia, who has two daughters from her previous couple, Nina and Rosaura, the latter married to the important and wealthy Ivan Villafranca. Both Virginia and her daughters live on mistreating Sara.

Sara and her best friend Doris study Nursing, since Salvador is in ruin and this does not allow her daughter to study a better career, and Salvador lives by blaming the Villafranca family for their bad situation.

Iván Villafranca, is a good man and exemplary husband who loves Rosaura, but she discovers that she can not have children; and for Iván not to leave her, she invents that he is who can not.

On the other hand, Sara meets David Villafranca, Ivan's brother, and falls in love with him despite the opposition of all. However, David, who is always speaking badly of his brother to Sara, just wants to take advantage of it; and when he does his own, he forsakes his lot. Ivan wants his brother to feel head and threatens to send him to Brazil with his cousin, Willy, to leave that bad life he is taking. David agrees to leave so he will not have to respond to Sara, who discovers that he is expecting his son.

Arcadio Villafranca, father of Iván and David, is assassinated, and Salvador is defendant of the crime and sentenced to prison. Desperate, Sara decides to call Ivan (whom she does not yet know personally) to ask for help, and if she is surprised to see that Iván, besides being a very attractive man, is a good man who is willing to help, very different from what David had made her believe. However, the help arrives too late: Desperate Savior committed suicide in prison.

Sara is alone and homeless and asks for help again, Ivan, who rages at her brother and promises that he will return to David to marry her, but bad news comes from Brazil: both David and Willy have died. The family goes into crisis, and Ivan decides to protect Sara, who has a big impact. It is then when Mrs. Ana, mother of Iván and David, takes to Sara to live to the house of the Villafranca, before the disease of Rosaura and the joy of Ivan.

Rosaura and Iván decide to adopt a boy to complete their family. The evil Rosaura decides to take advantage of the arrival of Sara, manipulating it and manages to convince it that it gives to the boy in adoption. Desperate and seeing that Ivan is a great man, Sara accepts, but makes it clear that she is only giving her son to Ivan. When the boy is born he is recognized by Ivan as a Villafranca.

Rosaura begins to behave worse and worse, and this causes Ivan to begin to fall in love with Sara. At first, Iván does not want to acknowledge his feelings, but finally realizes that he fell in love with her. Sara also begins to feel something for him and soon they initiate a romance to the hidden one of all. When the deceit of his wife is discovered, Ivan divorces her and decides to ask Sara for a couple, although she is not very convinced that she has stopped loving David. Sara accepts, but soon around her, they begin to weave nets of intrigue, since her friend, Doris, also fell in love with Ivan and wants to avoid that they marry.

Unexpectedly, David and Willy reappear alive. The two had been taken prisoner and subjected to torture by savages. David, very determined, says that he is going to marry Sara and demands to recognize his son. Iván, who does not know very well what to do, falls into a depression when Sara returns to accept David.

Later on one discovers a great family secret: Ivan is adopted. David does not hesitate to throw him in the face and demand that he renounce the surname Villafranca and the inheritance of his father. Iván agrees to leave the family, but Ana tells him that for her he is and always will be her son. His Uncle Basilio also gives his support to Ivan, telling him that he was the one who raised the company when he was ruined, that he has worked hard for her and has every right to his part; In addition, Arcadio decided that he was his son and that no one could take that right.

Sarah also defends Ivan against David and comforts him. When happiness already seems to be returning, David carries out one last evil: he tells Sara that Ivan knew his father was innocent. This one rages against Ivan, insults him and leaves him although he defends himself and swears that he knew nothing. Basilio tries to convince Sara that Ivan really did not know anything, that he was aware of it but did not hide it, but Sara does not forgive him and leaves the house taking his son. Ivan, defeated, decides to go to live in Brazil. Shortly afterwards, David is admitted to a home for the mentally ill.

Time goes by, and David totally recovers from his crisis. His mother tells him that he has to return home, because Ivan returns from Brazil and wants to see him. David accepts, and everyone receives Iván with great affection. Rosaura, who also learned of his return, decides to reconquer him and is scheduled to eat with him, but Ivan refuses.

Sara visits with her son and David tries to persuade her to return with him and that now she will make her happy, but the boy refuses his real father, which saddens him. As they talk, Iván arrives, and her presence restless to the young woman. Sara leaves David in the room and follows Ivan into the garden, asking forgiveness, declaring their love and kissing each other.

== Cast ==
- Daniela Castro as Sara Granados Rojas
- Eduardo Palomo as Iván Villafranca Linares
- Guillermo García Cantú as Noé Villafranca Linares
- Patricia Reyes Spíndola as Rolanda Verti de Granados
- Enrique Lizalde as Salvador Granados
- Julieta Egurrola as Diana Linares de Villafranca
- Humberto Elizondo as Arcadio Villafranca
- Kenia Gazcón as Paulina Granados Verti
- Claudia Ramírez as Aylín Granados Verti
- Rocío Sobrado as Doris Fernández
- Luz María Jerez as Mariana Armendariz
- Thelma Dorantes as Alicia
- Amparo Garrido as Isabel Armendariz
- Roberto Antúnez as Basilio Linares
- Juan Ignacio Aranda as Willy Linares
- Luis Xavier as Max Alponte
- Claudio Báez as Augusto
- Adalberto Parra
- Chantal Andere
- Lucy Tame
- Margarita Isabel
