= Rodolfina Gatica Garzón =

Mexican politician

- Born: 9 July 1965 (age 60); Guerrero, Mexico
- Occupation: Politician
- Political party: PRD

Rodolfina Gatica Garzón (born 9 July 1965) is a Mexican politician from the Party of the Democratic Revolution. In 2012, she served as Deputy of the LXI Legislature of the Mexican Congress representing Guerrero.
