= Lucho Gatica =

Chilean bolero singer

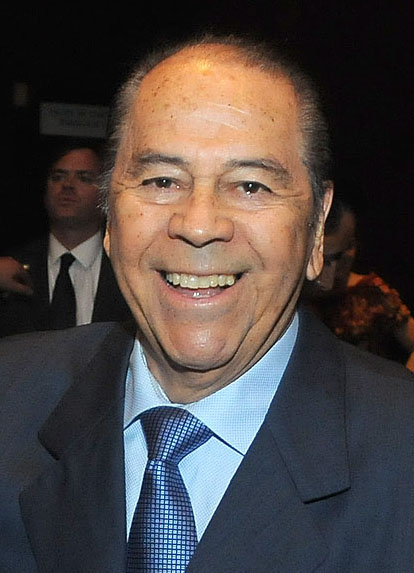
- Gatica in 2011
- Born: Luis Enrique Gatica Silva; 11 August 1928; Rancagua, Chile
- Died: 13 November 2018 (aged 90); Mexico City, Mexico

Luis Enrique Gatica Silva (11 August 1928 – 13 November 2018), better known as Lucho Gatica, was a Chilean-born Mexican singer, musician and actor. He was specialized in the musical genres of bolero, tonada and romantic ballad. It is estimated that Gatica released more than 90 recordings. He toured across the world, performing in Europe, the Middle East and Asia. He was the uncle of the record producer Humberto Gatica.

== Early life ==
Lucho Gatica was born in Rancagua. He attended school at the Instituto O'Higgins. He and his brother Arturo were struggling singers before they released their first album in 1949, when Gatica was 21 years old.

Chileans generally experienced a change in their taste in music during the 1950s, when the bolero overtook the tango as Chileans' preferred music genre. Singers like Cuba's Olga Guillot, Argentinian Leo Marini and Mexican Elvira Ríos, among others, became popular during that time. So were Xavier Cugat and his orchestra, which included Puerto Rican Bobby Capó. These singers would influence Gatica.

== Career ==
Gatica's first record, 1951's "Piel Canela" (Cinnamon Skin), became a hit across Latin America. The next year he released "Contigo en la distancia" (With You in the Distance). Gatica recorded his version of Consuelo Velázquez's "Bésame Mucho" (Kiss Me a Lot) in 1953. He produced two more albums that year: Las Muchachas de la Plaza España (The Girls from Spain Square) and Sinceridad (Sincerity). The following year his hit "Sinceridad" was released.

Gatica moved to Mexico in 1957, where he recorded and released No me platiques más (Don't Talk to me Anymore), Tú me acostumbraste (You Accustomed Me) and Voy a apagar la Luz (I'm Turning the Lights Off), which was released in 1959. In 1956, Gatica's songs were recorded in the United States on LP for the first time by Capitol Records. Three albums were released within 14 months by Capitol. The third one in that group with Capitol was El Gran Gatica, which featured such songs as "Somos" ("We Are"), "Sabrá Dios" ("God Will Know"), and Si me comprendieras ("If You Understood Me"). One of the three Gatica albums released in 1958 was a greatest hits compilation; the third was named Envenenados (The Poisoned). He also recorded a song entitled "Encadenados" (Chained).

== Personal life ==
After arriving in Mexico, Gatica decided to become a permanent resident there. He married Puerto Rican actress Mapita Cortés, who also resided in Mexico. The couple had two sons named Luis and Alfredo. Gatica became a telenovela and rock star during the 1980s; his son Alfredo became a music entrepreneur. Gatica divorced Cortés in 1981. The following year he married Diane Lane Schmidt and had a daughter named Lily; Schmidt died in 1985. He then married his last wife, Leslie Deeb, in 1986. Altogether he had seven children.

== Awards ==
In 2001, Gatica was inducted into the International Latin Music Hall of Fame. In the same year, his renditions of "La Barca" and "El Reloj" were inducted into the Latin Grammy Hall of Fame. Gatica himself was one of the recipients of the Latin Grammy Lifetime Achievement Award in 2007. He also received a star on the Hollywood Walk of Fame for Recording in 2008.

== Death ==
Gatica died in Mexico on 13 November 2018 from pneumonia.

== See also ==
- List of best-selling Latin music artists
