= Raymundo Capetillo =

Mexican actor (1943–2020)

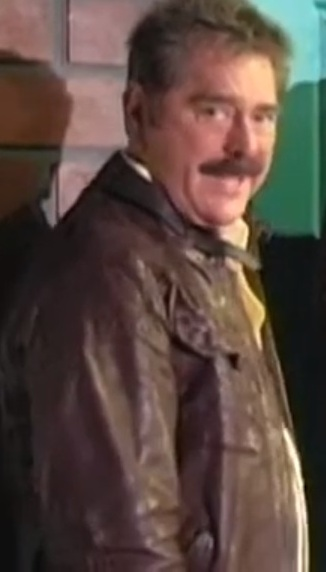
- Capetillo in 2011
- Born: Raymundo Sánchez y Capetillo; 1 September 1943; Mexico City, Mexico
- Died: 12 July 2020 (aged 76); Mexico City, Mexico
- Occupation: Actor
- Years active: 1969–2017

Raymundo Sánchez y Capetillo, known as Raymundo Capetillo (1 September 1943 – 12 July 2020), was a Mexican theater, film, television and radio actor. He was also an economist by profession and an English teacher.

== Career ==
Capetillo started out as an actor in the late 1960s, worked in television, film and theater.

He was admitted to the San Ángel Inn hospital in Mexico City on 5 July 2020, due to respiratory problems. He died a week later, on 12 July, at the age of 76, from complications of COVID-19 during the COVID-19 pandemic in Mexico.

== Filmography ==
=== Telenovelas ===
- 1969 - De la tierra a la luna
- 1971 - Muchacha italiana viene a casarse
- 1974 - Ana del aire
- 1977 - La venganza .... Eduardo
- 1978 - Mamá Campanita .... Gabriel Carbajal
- 1978 - Viviana .... Alfonso Cernuda
- 1980 - Aprendiendo a amar .... Hugo
- 1983 - Un solo corazón .... Roberto
- 1983 - La fiera .... Marcial Urquiza
- 1985 - Juana Iris .... Rafael
- 1987 - Victoria .... Joaquín de los Santos
- 1987 - Rosa salvaje .... Doctor Reynaldo
- 1989 - El hombre que debe morir .... Dr. Ciro Valdez
- 1991 - Cadenas de amargura .... Renato Garza
- 1992 - Mágica juventud .... Ernesto Grimaldi
- 1996 - Marisol .... Diego Montalvo
- 1997 - No tengo madre .... Norberto Nerón
- 1998 - Soñadoras .... Horacio de la Macorra
- 1999 - Alma rebelde
- 1999 - Mujeres engañadas .... Ramiro
- 2000 - Cuento de Navidad .... Invitado en la lucha libre
- 2000 - Mi destino eres tú .... Sergio Rivadeneira
- 2001 - El manantial .... Dr. Álvaro Luna
- 2003 - Velo de novia .... Filemón Paz
- 2004 - Corazones al límite .... Daniel Molina
- 2005 - Barrera de amor .... Nicolás Linares
- 2007 - Pasión .... Justo Darién
- 2009 - Corazón salvaje .... Raúl de Marín
- 2012 - Amor bravío .... Francisco Javier Díaz Velasco
- 2013 - Mentir para vivir .... Juez Edmundo Valencia

=== Television ===
- 2002 - Mujer, casos de la vida real
- 2007 - La rosa de Guadalupe .... Gonzalo
- 2008 - Mujeres asesinas .... Mariano Dávila
- 2012 - Como dice el dicho .... Álvaro

=== Film ===
- 1969 - Rosas blancas para mi hermana negra
- 1970 - La hermanita Dinamita
- 1973 - El amor tiene cara de mujer
- 1973 - Los perros de Dios
- 1975 - Santo en Anónimo mortal

=== Theatre ===
- Sigue tu onda
- Morirás desnudo
- Mame
- Ensalada de Nochebuena
- Ifigenia en Áulide
- Juguetes para un matrimonio
- Ensalada de amantes
- Como tú me deseas
- Entre pitones te veas
- Billy
- El monstruo sagrado
- Aprendiendo a ser señora
- Don Juan Tenorio
- El pozo de la soledad
- Cena de matrimonios
- La llorona
- Sexualidades
- El cerco de la cabra dorada
- Eduardo II de Inglaterra
- Agosto
- Un amante sin vergüenza
