= Al filo de la muerte =

Television series

- Genre: Telenovela; Romance; Drama
- Written by: Fernanda Villeli; Marcia Yancé
- Directed by: Alfredo Gurrola; José Ángel García
- Starring: Humberto Zurita; Gabriela Rivero; Antonio Escobar; Blanca Guerra; Manuel Ojeda; Raúl Araiza; Ana Patricia Rojo
- Opening theme: "Al filo de la muerte" by Héctor Yaber
- Ending theme: "Fuego Contra Fuego" by Ricky Martin
- Country of origin: Mexico
- Original language: Spanish
- No. of episodes: 180

Production
- Executive producer: Emilio Larrosa
- Running time: 21–22 minutes
- Production company: Televisa

Original release
- Network: Canal de las Estrellas
- Release: June 17, 1991 – February 21, 1992

Related
- Amor de nadie; La sonrisa del diablo

Al filo de la muerte (English: At the edge of death) is a Mexican telenovela produced by Emilio Larrosa for Televisa in 1991.

Humberto Zurita and Gabriela Rivero starred in this telenovela.

== Plot ==
Tracy López is a young nurse who lives in Los Angeles with her boyfriend, Sam Ross. Their relationship is relatively quiet, until Tracy accidentally witnesses a murder committed by her boyfriend. Frightened, she goes to the Police Department telling what she saw. She subsequently finds out that Sam has been lying to her the whole time as he actually has criminal connections to the mafia. The police introduce Tracy to the Witness Protection Program, where she is given a new identity: from now on her name will be Mariela Foret. Following the instructions they give her, she flees the country to Mexico City. There she is employed in a prestigious hospital belonging to the respected cardiologist Francisco Riquer, who as a person is hard and full of remorse, because he could not save his wife and son, who died in the 1985 Mexico earthquake. But as a doctor, on the other hand, he is noble and compassionate.

Francisco and Tracy will meet and despite the initial disagreements they have, they will end up falling in love; but Sam, furious at having been betrayed by his girlfriend, will travel to Mexico not willing to let her be happy with the doctor.

== Cast ==
- Humberto Zurita as Dr. Francisco Riquer
- Gabriela Rivero as Tracy López / Mariela Foret
- Antonio Escobar as Sam Ross
- Blanca Guerra as Alina Estrada
- Manuel Ojeda as Julio Araujo
- Adriana Roel as Laura Robles
- Carlos Cámara as Luigi Valenti
- Alonso Echánove as Father Juan
- Luz María Jerez as Iris Salgado
- Ana Patricia Rojo as Mónica Álvarez
- José Ángel García as Dr. Arturo Lozano
- Stephanie Salas as Pilar Orozco
- Raquel Pankowsky as Adela
- Germán Bernal as Ricardo Araujo
- Egardo Gazcón as Dr. Raúl Soto
- Alejandra Morales as Patricia
- Miguel Priego as Jorge Palacios
- Antonio Miguel as Erasmo
- Guillermo Aguilar as Manuel Palacios
- Raúl Araiza as Marcial Duboa
- Luisa Huertas as Liliana
- Mauricio Ferrari as Humberto Álvarez
- Antonio Ruiz as Rodrigo
- Beatriz Martínez as Eugenia
- Josefina Escobedo as Emilia
- Rebeca Manríquez as Mrs. Gálvez
- Anabel Villegas as Rita
- Alberto Inzúa as Alfredo
- Miguel Suárez as Father José Antonio
- Marcial Salinas as Sabino
- Melba Luna as Doña Paz
- Toño Infante as King
- Sergio Sendel
- Julio Monterde as Marcelino
- Maricarmen Vela as Karla
- Fernando Gálvez as Salvador
- José Luis Duval as Guillén
- Carmen Amezcua as Lindsay
- Alfredo Gurrola as Tony
- Antonio Rangel as Rodman
- Ángeles Marín as Luz
- Rosa Elena Díaz as Elvira
- Gerardo Paz as Forman
- Mario del Río
- José Roberto Hill as Salgado
- Alfonso Ramírez
- Romina Castro
- Roberto Sen as Carlos
- Alicia Campos as Violeta
- Concepción Martínez
- Kokin as Matías
- Enrique Muñoz as Rufo
- Homero Wilmer as Pierre
- Eduardo Arizpe as Frank
- Laura Beyer as Alma
- Sara Guasch as Carolina
- Benjamín Islas as Rambo
- Jaime Lozano as "El Bronco"
- Guy de Saint Cyr as Captain Walters
- Oscar Vallejo as Quique
- Ana Graham as Greta
- Rosita Bouchot as Prieta
- Raúl Alberto as Adrián
- Edith Kleiman as Martina
- Lourdes Canale as Roberta
- Tere Salinas as Doris
- Angélica Ynrrigarro as Susana
- Francisco Casasola as David
- Dobrina Cristeva as Christa
- Claudia Vega as Silvia
- Marcela Arguimbau as Lourdes

== Awards ==
Year	Award	Category	Nominee	Result
1992	10th TVyNovelas Awards	Best Actor	Humberto Zurita	Won
