= Delia Casanova =

Mexican actress

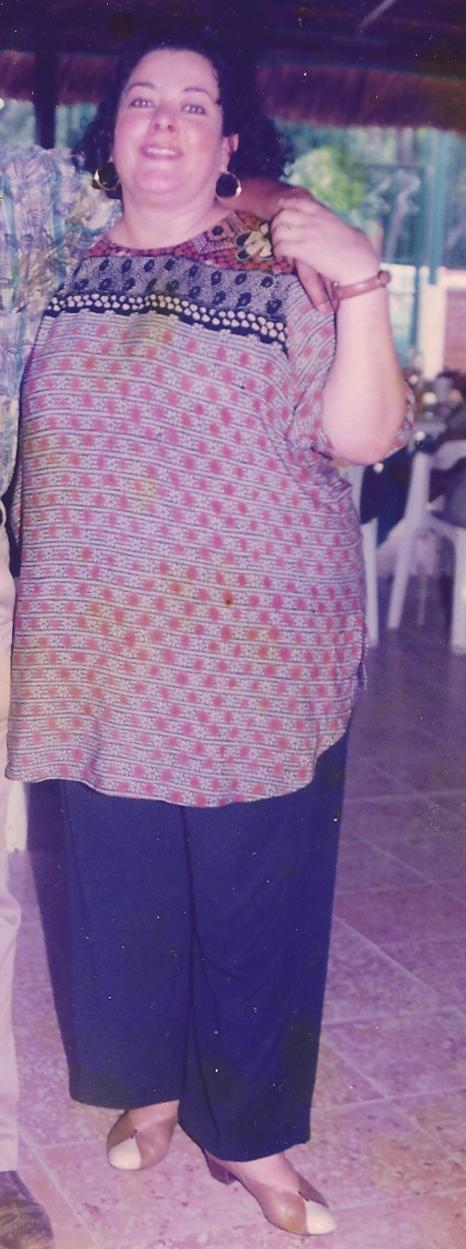
- Born: Delia Margarita Casanova Mendiola; November 4, 1948 (age 76); Poza Rica, Veracruz, Mexico
- Occupation: Actress
- Years active: 1972-present
- Awards: Ariel Award for Best Actress; 1989 Mentiras piadosas

Delia Casanova (born Delia Margarita Casanova Mendiola November 4, 1948, in Poza Rica, Veracruz) is a Mexican actress.

== Filmography ==
Films, Telenovelas
| Year | Title | Role | Notes |
|---|---|---|---|
| 1972 | Palacio chino | | Film |
| 1975 | El cumpleaños del perro | Secretary | Film |
| 1976 | The Heist | La Chata | Film |
| 1976 | El esperado amor desesperado | Baby's mother | Film |
| 1977 | El viaje | | Film |
| 1977 | Cuartelazo | Soldadera | Film |
| 1978 | Llovizna | Luisa | Film |
| 1980 | Algo sobre Jaime Sabines | | Film |
| 1980-81 | Caminemos | Violeta | Supporting role |
| 1981 | Toda una vida | Moravia Castro | Supporting role |
| 1981 | Que viva Tepito | María Luisa Vélez de Ochoa | Film |
| 1981 | El infierno de todos tan temido | Mariana | Film |
| 1982 | El día que murió Pedro Infante | | Film |
| 1982 | Alsino y el cóndor | Rosaria | Film |
| 1982 | Los gemelos alborotados | | Film |
| 1983 | Eréndira | Narrator (voice) | Film |
| 1984 | La pasión de Isabela | Natalia "La Peregrina" | Supporting role |
| 1985 | El escuadrón de la muerte | Ruth "La Peregrina" | Film |
| 1985 | Los Motivos de Luz | Dr. Rebollar | Film |
| 1985 | Historias violentas | | Film |
| 1985-86 | De pura sangre | Laura Blanchet | Supporting role |
| 1986-1987 | Cicatrices del alma | Blanca | Supporting role |
| 1988 | Pasión y poder | Dolores | Supporting role |
| 1988 | Esperanza | Catalina | Film |
| 1989 | Mentiras piadosas | Clara Zamudio | Film |
| 1989 | Luz y sombra | Marcedes "Meche" de Suárez | Supporting role |
| 1990 | Recuerdo de domingo | | Film |
| 1991 | Después del sismo | | Film |
| 1991 | Cadenas de amargura | Natalia Vizcaíno Lara | Protagonist |
| 1992 | Una moneda en el aire | | Film |
| 1992 | El bulto | Alba | Film |
| 1993 | Memoria del cine mexicano | | Film |
| 1993 | Otoñal | | Film |
| 1993 | Los Parientes Pobres | Eloísa de Olmos | Antagonist |
| 1995 | El callejón de los milagros | Eusebia | Film |
| 1995 | Bésame En La Boca | Consuelo | Film |
| 1995 | La paloma | Elsa | Supporting role |
| 1996 | La culpa | Graciela | Supporting role |
| 1996 | Entre Pancho Villa y una mujer desnuda | | Film |
| 1996 | Sobrenatural | Madame Endor | Film |
| 1999 | En un claroscuro dela luna | Rafaela | Film |
| 1999 | La ley de herodes | Rosa | Film |
| 1999 | Nunca Te Olvidaré | Doña Carmen | Supporting role |
| 2000-01 | Rayito de luz | Gertrudis Montes | TV mini-series |
| 2001 | Sin pecado concebido | Sor Jovita | Supporting role |
| 2005 | Como tú me has deseado | | Film |
| 2005 | La esposa virgen | Clemencia | Supporting role |
| 2006 | Mujer, casos de la vida real | | TV series |
| 2006 | Mas que a nada en el mundo | | Film |
| 2007 | S.O.S.: Sexo y otros Secretos | Anciana | TV series |
| 2007-08 | Tormenta en el paraíso | Micaela Trinidad | Supporting role |
| 2008 | Todos hemos pecado | Doña Chayo | Film |
| 2008 | Arráncame la vida | | Film |
| 2008-09 | Alma de Hierro | Mother Perpetua | Special appearance |
| 2008-09 | Cuidado con el ángel | Mrs. Márgara Riquelme | Special appearance |
| 2009 | Forever Lupe | | Film |
| 2010 | Locas de amor | Cruz | Special appearance |
| 2011 | La Fuerza del Destino | Doña Carlota vda. de Curiel | Co-protagonist |
| 2011 | La suerte está echada | | Film |
| 2011 | Así es la suerte | Lidia | Film |
| 2015 | Lo imperdonable | Matilde | Supporting role |

== Awards and nominations ==
| Year | Award | Category | Telenovela | Result |
|---|---|---|---|---|
| 1986 | TVyNovelas Awards | Best Young Lead Actress | De pura sangre | Nominated |
| 1992 | TVyNovelas Awards | Best Co-star Actress | Cadenas de amargura | Nominated |
| 2006 | TVyNovelas Awards | Best First Actress | La esposa virgen | Won |
| 2012 | TVyNovelas Awards | Best First Actress | La Fuerza del Destino | Won |
| 1984 | Ariel Award | Best Actress | El día que murió Pedro Infante | Nominated |
| 1989 | Ariel Award | Best Actress | Mentiras piadosas | Won |
| 1992 | Ariel Award | Best Actress in a Minor Role | El bulto | Nominated |
| 1995 | Ariel Award | Best Actress in a Minor Role | El callejón de los milagros | Nominated |
| 1996 | Ariel Award | Best Supporting Actress | Sobrenatural | Nominated |
| 2011 | Premios People en Español | Best Supporting Actress | La Fuerza del Destino | Won |
| 2012 | Premios ACE (New York) | Best Actress Characteristic | La Fuerza del Destino | Won |
