= Luis Gatica =

Mexican actor and singer

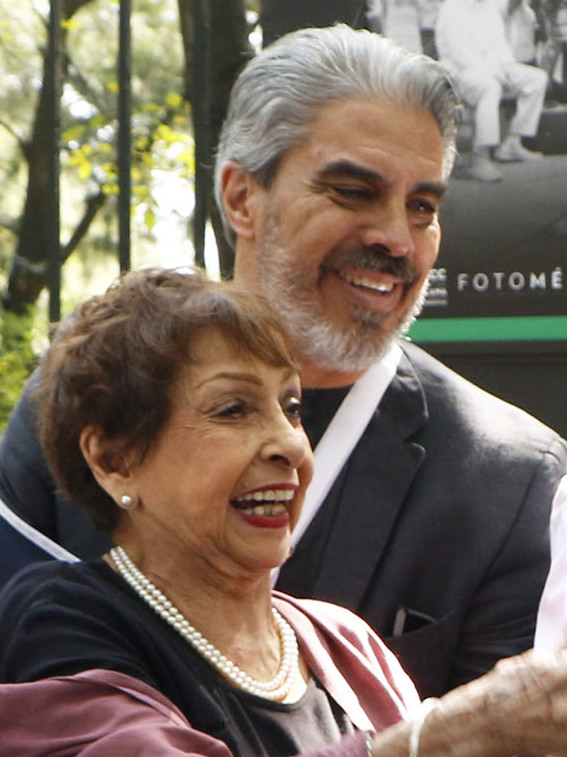
- Gatica in 2019
- Born: Luis Gatica y Morales Cordero; 25 February 1961 (age 65); Veracruz, Mexico
- Education: Centro de Educación Artística
- Occupation: Actor
- Years active: 1984–present
- Children: Alfredo Gatica (nephew)
- Parents: Lucho Gatica (father); Mapita Cortés (mother)

Luis Gatica (born February 25, 1961) is a Mexican actor, son of the singer Lucho Gatica and the actress Mapita Cortés. He is the uncle of fellow actor Alfredo Gatica.

== Biography ==
Luis Gatica was born in Veracruz, Mexico. He grew in a show business family. He is the son of Chilean singer Lucho Gatica and Puerto Rican actress Mapita Cortés; he is the nephew of Puerto Rican actress Mapy Cortés and second cousin of Puerto Rican actor, comedian and producer Paquito Cordero. Having celebrity relatives both in Mexico and in Puerto Rico, Gatica wanted to become a celebrity on his own since he was very young. Gatica participated in various theater plays and in some, not particularly notable, music groups as he grew. He struggled trying to follow in his parents' footsteps.

His first big break came in 1983, when he was hired by Televisa to act in La fiera, which is considered a contemporary classic among telenovelas. In 1984, he played Joel in Los años felices (The Happy Years). This was followed by 1986's Marionetas (Puppets), where he played Jorge Linares.

Having obtained celebrity status for the first time, Gatica tried his luck in the world of music, retiring from television from 1986 to 1994. Although his foray into the world of rock music was largely unsuccessful, he nevertheless kept active for those eight years, singing in many Mexican locations.

In 1994, he was offered a return to television, and he did so by participating in another Mexican classic, Marimar, playing Chuy. Gatica then made his film debut, when he participated in 1995's Tiempo de Muerte 2 (Time to Die 2).

Tiempo de Muerte 2 was followed by A sangre fría ("In cold blood") where he played Beto. In 1996, Gatica returned to acting in telenovelas, participating in La antorcha encendida (The burning torch), as Juan Foncerrada and in Mi querida Isabel (My beloved Isabel), where he played Ricardo.

He took one year off before returning to the screen in 1998, acting as Ruben in Cazador de cazadores (Hunter of hunters), an action movie. That same year, he participated as Patricio in Preciosa, another telenovela that was successful. That telenovela was followed by another one, La mentira (The Lie), where he personified Santiago.

Luis Gatica made one telenovela in 1999: in DKDA: Suenos de Juventud (DKDA: Dreams of Youth), he played Raul Arias.

Returning to the film industry in 2000, Gatica played Rodrigo Miranda in Cuenta saldada (Paid Debt).

His next work, however, was in a soap opera marred by general criticism by magazine and newspaper telenovela critics. Sin Pecado Concebido, where he played doctor Garduno, was not well received by the media, which doomed the show with tele-spectators, and the soap opera was not a success.

In 2002, Gatica joined other celebrities in the Big Brother reality show, in Mexico City.

Gatica began 2003 by participating in another telenovela: he played Jorge Esparza in Niña Amada Mía (Beloved girl of mine). This was followed by Clap! El lugar de tus sueños (Clap! the place of your dreams), where he played Rivadeneira, and by 2004's Rubí, where he acted as Cayetano.

In 2006, he acted in the telenovela produced by José Alberto Castro Codigo Postal, as Herman. In 2008, he appeared in "En Nombre del Amor" In 2014, he acted yet again in another telenovela produced by Roberto Gómez Fernandez El Color de la Pasión, as Ricardo Marquez.

In 2008, he appeared in "En Nombre del Amor" In 2014, he acted yet again in another telenovela produced by Roberto Gómez Fernandez El Color de la Pasión, as Ricardo Marquez.

== Television roles ==
Year	Title	Roles	Notes
1984	Los años felices	Joel	
1986	Marionetas	Jorge Linares	
1993	La última esperanza	José	
1994	Marimar	Chuy	
1996	La antorcha encendida	Juan Foncerrada	
1996	Mi querida Isabel	Ricardo	
1998	Preciosa	Patricio	
1999–2000	DKDA: Sueños de juventud	Raúl Arias	
2000–2003	Mujer, casos de la vida real	Various roles	9 episodes
2000–2001	Rayito de luz	Cruz Ramírez	
2001	Sin pecado concebido	Gerardo Garduño	
2003	Niña amada mía	Jorge Esparza	
2003	Clap, el lugar de tus sueños	Rivadeniera	
2004	Rubí	Cayetano Martínez	
2005–2008	Vecinos	Eduardo	Episodes: "Con zapatos de tacón" and "Un embarazo embarazoso"
2006–2007	Código postal	Germán De Alba	
2007	Objetos perdidos	Various Characters	Epiosode: "Objeto 10"
2007–2008	El Pantera	Procurador	Recurring role; 15 episodes
2008	La rosa de Guadalupe	Pepe	Episode: "Cristinita"
2009	En nombre del amor	Fiscal Mariano Cordero	Episodes: "Definitivo" and "Sólo un deseo"
2009	Adictos	Leo	Recurring role; 5 episodes
2009	Mujeres asesinas	Guillermo Jiménez	Episode: "Carmen, honrada"
2009	Alma de hierro	Abraham Elizondo	Episodes: "Detenerla" and "Gran final"
2009	Tiempo final	Agente López	Episode: "La mula"
2009–2010	Corazón salvaje	Remigio García	Series regular; 135 episodes
2010	Persons Unknown	Head of Security	Episode: "The Truth"
2010–2011	Cuando me enamoro	Lázaro López	Series regular; 154 episodes
2011	Ni contigo ni sin ti	Unknown role	Episode: "Gran final"
2012–2018	Como dice el dicho	Various roles	7 episodes
2012	Por ella soy Eva	Gustavo	Episode: "Fernando sinvergüenza"
2012	Amor bravío	Hipolito	Recurring role; 46 episodes
2013	Nueva vida	Fernando	Episode: "Bebé"
2013	Mentir para vivir	Samuel	Recurring role; 22 episodes
2013	Lo que la vida me robó	Bruno Gamboa	Recurring role; 3 episodes
2013–2014	Qué pobres tan ricos	Osiel	Series regular; 153 episodes
2014	The Color of Passion	Ricardo	Main Antagonist; 54 episodes
2014	The Stray Cat	Licenciado Gutiérrez	Recurring role; 11 episodes
2015	Yo no creo en los hombres, el origen	Néstor	Television film
2015–2016	La vecina	Pedro	Series regular; 146 episodes
2016	El hotel de los secretos	Genaro	Series regular; 37 episodes
2016	Mujeres de negro	Fiscal	Episode: "Entre el amor y la justicia: Part 2"
2016	40 y 20	Víctor	3 episodes
2017	El Bienamado	Ambrosio Cárdenas	Series regular; 65 episodes
2018	Por amar sin ley	Fausto	Recurring role (season 1); 3 episodes
2018	Tenías que ser tú	Unknown role	Recurring role; 4 episodes
2018	La jefa del campeón	Emiliano Linares	Series regular; 54 episodes
2019	Esta historia me suena	Andrés	Episode: "El Gran Varón"
2019	Preso No. 1	Adonis Madrigal	Recurring role; 23 episodes
2019	Médicos	Paco Juárez	Recurring role; 5 episodes

== See also ==
- List of Chileans
- List of Mexicans
- List of Puerto Ricans
