= Mariana Levy =

Mexican actress and singer (1966–2005)

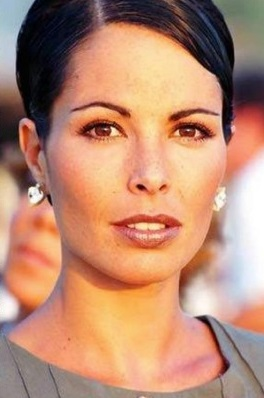
- Born: Mariana Levy Fernández; 22 April 1966; Mexico City, México
- Died: 29 April 2005 (aged 39); Mexico City, México
- Spouse(s): Ariel López Padilla (1988–1997; divorced); Jose María Fernández Michel (2000–2005; her death)
- Parents: Gerardo Jorge Levy (father); Talina Fernández (mother)

Mariana Levy Fernández (22 April 1966 – 29 April 2005) was a Mexican telenovela actress, singer and television show host. She was the daughter of actress Talina Fernández and banker Gerardo Jorge Levy and the sister of Pato Levy.

== Biography ==
Mariana Levy Fernández was born in Mexico City. By the time she turned sixteen in 1982, she participated in her first Televisa soap opera, Vivir Enamorada ("Living in Love"), where she played "Verónica". Levy took 1983 off, then returned to the small screen in 1984, in a major Televisa hit, Los Años Felices ("The Happy Years"). In Los Años Felices, she played the role of "Nancy". Her next telenovela, Martín Garatuza (1986) was not successful. The opposite can be said of her next work, as "Linda", in 1987's Rosa Salvaje ("Wild Rosa"). Rosa Salvaje, about a girl named Rosa who falls in love with a millionaire but was not accepted by his family, became a hit all over Latin America, Europe and Asia. Levy became known in places including Spain, Puerto Rico, Russia, Venezuela and Argentina.

She participated in 1988's Lo Blanco y Lo Negro ("What's White and What's Black"), alongside Rafael Sánchez Navarro among others, as "Alma de Castro". She took off the rest of the 1980s, but, in 1990, she returned to television with the task of playing three characters in the same soap opera; playing "Ángela", "Gimena" and "Estrella" in Yo compro esa mujer ("I'll buy that woman").

She married again, this time to José María Fernández, the half brother of Chantal Andere. In 2003, Mariana Levy joined her mother, Talina Fernández, as cohost of her televised variety show, Nuestra Casa ("Our House"), and also participated in her final telenovela, the hugely successful Amor Real. This production was set in the mid 19th century, and in one of her most memorable characters ever, Mariana played "Josefina", an ugly-duckling-turned-swan character. Levy retired to give birth to Paula and José Emilio.

== Death ==
Levy died of a heart attack on 29 April 2005 during a robbery attempt in Mexico City, Distrito Federal, Mexico. The heart attack was attributed to the stress she experienced after an assailant approached her car on a city street and tried to steal her watch. The death shook the Mexican entertainment world. It was one of the highest-profile deaths in Mexico's wave of common crime since TV comedian Paco Stanley was gunned down in 1999. According to Mexican journalist Lolita Ayala, "her heart apparently could not take the shock."

== Television roles ==
Title	Year	Role	Notes
Vivir enamorada	1982	Verónica	
Los años felices	1984	Nancy	
Martín Garatuza	1986	Beatriz de Samaniego	
Rosa salvaje	1987–1988	Erlinda González	
Lo blanco y lo negro	1989	Alma de Castro	
Yo compro esa mujer	1990	Jimena	
Hora marcada	1990	Isabel	Episode: "Pesadilla"
En carne propia	1990	Dulce Olivia Serrano	
La pícara soñadora	1991	Lupita López	
La última esperanza	1993	Estelita	
El vuelo del águila	1994	Young Carmen Romero Rubio	
Caminos cruzados	1995	Patricia	
Bendita mentira	1996	Carolina	
Leonela	1997	Leonela Ferrari Mirabal	
Cuento de Navidad	1999	Guadalupe	
La casa en la playa	2000	Elisa White de Villarreal	
Rayito de luz	2000		
Mujer, casos de la vida real	2002		Episode: "Abandonado"
Amor real	2003	Josefina De Icaza	
