= Elizabeth Arciniega =

Mexican-Swiss actress

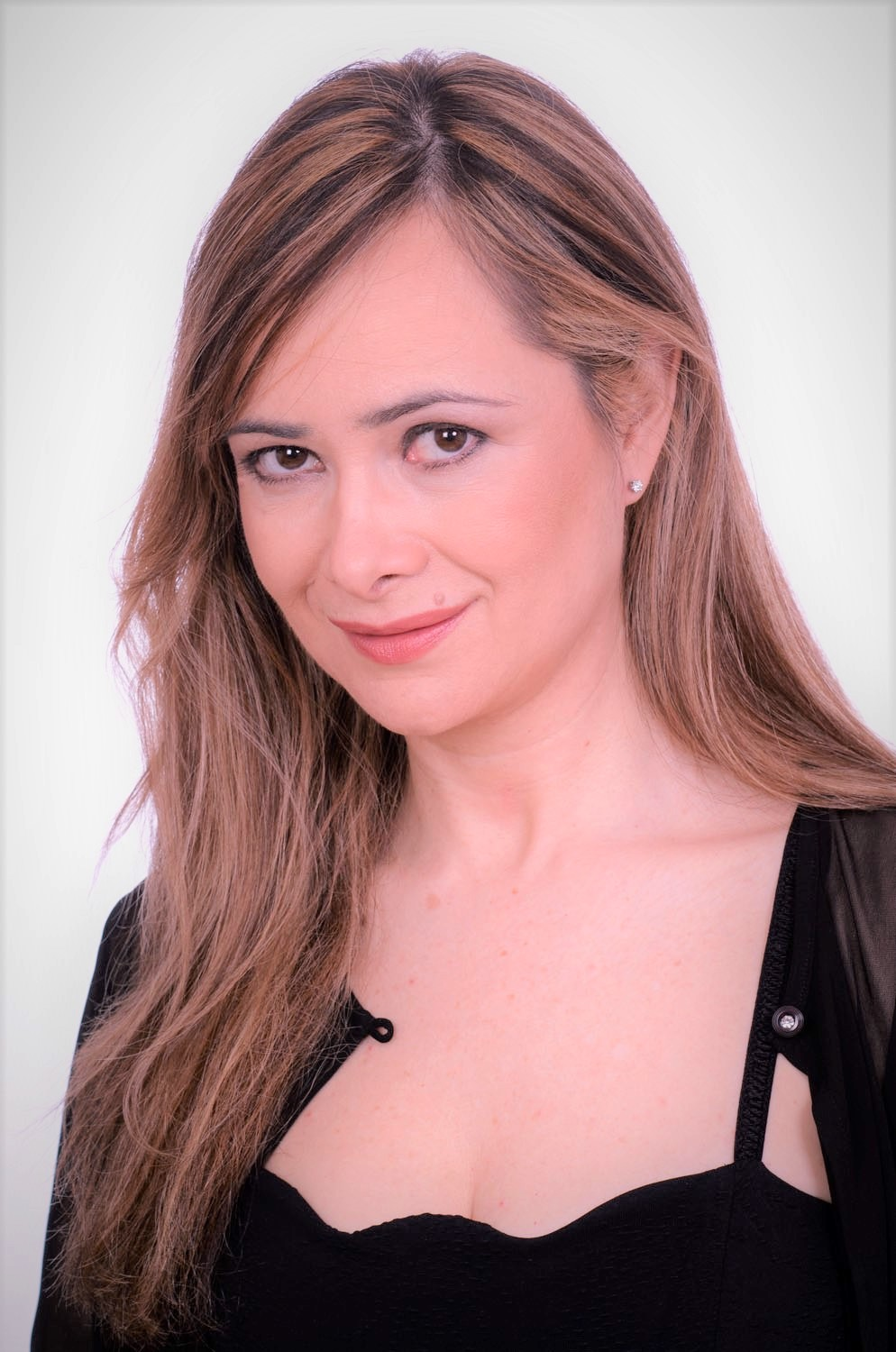
- Elizabeth Arciniega (2018)
- Born: Elizabeth Arciniega Haag; Mexico City, Mexico
- Education: National Autonomous University in Mexico
- Occupations: Actress, director
- Years active: 1985–present

Elizabeth Arciniega (born Elizabeth Arciniega Haag) is a Mexican actress and director in living in Zürich.

== Life ==
Born in Mexico City, Mexico, Arciniega studied dramatic literature and theatre at the National Autonomous University in Mexico (UNAM). Afterwards she studied further under Adriana Barraza and Ludwik Margules to perfect her acting skills.

Her first lead roles were on stage in classical plays such as Poesia en voz muda de Luis Mario Moncada where she was nominated as the best actress in the V. National Youth Theater Award, which was organised by the National Institute Bellas Artes (INBA), the Administration of the Government of Mexico City (DDF), SOCICULTUR and the centre of youth consultation and was handed over by José Solé. For the role of Laura Winfield in The Glass Menagerie she got the award for the best new actress from the Mexican Society for Theatre Critics (AMCT). Following this she played numerous roles in theatre, television mini-dramas and films. All in all she has contributed to more than 50 productions though most of her lead roles have been in theatre.

The television mini-dramas María Belén and Mujeres engañadas have been a highlight as they were exported all over the world after January 2001. Arciniega played the lawyer defending the child María Belén.

Another career highlight has been her role in 2008 in the James Bond film Quantum of Solace, where she played the girlfriend of Mr. White, Bond's opponent.

In 2004 she married a Swiss and moved to Zurich where she founded the theatre group LaVox Theater, in which she is director and actress. The aim of LaVox Theater is to bring an awareness and understanding of the Spanish spoken theatre and culture into the German-speaking areas. LaVox Theater had presentations in different Swiss cities and was honored by two Mexican ambassadors in Switzerland for the presentations of Rosa de dos Aromas, Biografía de Mujer and Sueño de Monja.

== Filmography ==
Telenovelas, Series, Films, Theater, Director
Year	Title	Role	Notes
1990	The Great Theater of the World		Theatrical Performance
1990	Bedroom farce		Theatrical Performance
1990	Yo compro esa mujer	María Contreras	Supporting role
1991-1992	Cuando la radio conmovió a México		Theatrical Performance
1994	The other exile: Homage to Albert Camus		Theatrical Performance
1994-1995	Jardín de pulpos	Merceditas	Theatrical Performance
1997	Bajo las sábanas	Alma	Theatrical Performance
1997-1998	Desencuentro		Special appearance
1999-2000	Mujeres engañadas	Guadalupe Edelmira Silis Chacón	Supporting role
2000	Mujer, casos de la vida real		TV series
2001	María Belén	Lic. Laura Paola Rocha	Supporting role
2003	Lucía, Lucía	Edith	Film
2005	Linea di confine		
2005	Ultramar	Chona	Theatrical Performance
2005	Grounding	Stewardess	Film
2008	Quantum of Solace	Mr. White's girlfriend	Film
2008-2010	Rosa de dos aromas	Marlene	Director & Theatrical Performance
2012-2015	Biografía de Mujer (A woman's biography)	La mujer sola (lonely woman)	Director & Theatrical Performance
2016-2018	Sueño de Monja	Sor Juana (Sister Juana)	Director & Theatrical Performance
