= Ámbar =

Ámbar may refer to:

- Ámbar, the Spanish version of the name Amber
- Ámbar (TV series), a Chilean telenovela
