= El niño que vino del mar =

Mexican telenovela

- Genre: Telenovela
- Created by: Original Story: Olga Ruilopez; Adaptation: Lourdes Barrios; Georgina Tinoco; Marcos García
- Directed by: Arturo Garcia Tenorio; Alfredo Gurrola
- Starring: Imanol Landeta; Natalia Esperón; Enrique Ibáñez
- Theme music composer: Rubén Zepeda
- Opening theme: "El niño que vino del mar" by Malú
- Ending theme: "La estrella que más brilla" by Imanol Landeta and Manuel Landeta
- Country of origin: Mexico
- Original language: Spanish
- No. of episodes: 95

Production
- Executive producer: Mapat L. de Zatarain
- Cinematography: Héctor Marquez; Óscar Morales

Original release
- Network: Canal de las Estrellas
- Release: April 19 – August 27, 1999

Related
- La hija de nadie (1982); Sí, mi amor (1984)

El niño que vino del mar (English: The boy who came from the sea) is a Mexican telenovela produced by Mapat L. de Zatarain for Televisa in 1999. It stars Imanol Landeta, Natalia Esperón and Enrique Ibáñez.

== Cast ==
- Imanol as Felipín Rodríguez Cáceres de Rivera
- Natalia Esperón as Nisa
- Enrique Ibáñez as Eduardo Cáceres de Rivera
- Saúl Lisazo as Don Alfonso Rodríguez Cáceres de Rivera "Duque de Oriol"
- Patricia Reyes Spíndola as Alberta Gómez
- Yadhira Carrillo as Magdalena de la Soledad / Sol / Lena / Morena
- Renée Varsi as Constanza Fernandez Cadayana
- Manuel Landeta as Carlos Criail
- Sussan Taunton as Srita. Bernardette Guyón
- Orlando Miguel as Enrique Rodríguez Cáceres de Rivera
- Luz María Aguilar as Sophia Rodríguez Cáceres de Rivera
- Rolando Brito as Nazario
- Joana Brito as Rancha
- Irma Lozano as Tía Pilar Serrano
- [Sergio Ramos "El Comanche" as Omobono Tabonar "Chirimbolo"
- Luz Elena González as Jacinta
- Rafael del Villar as Marco
- Vanessa Angers as Alina
- Dacia Arcaráz as Remedios
- Emilia Carranza as Regina
- Roberto D'Amico as Óscar Serrano
- Yousi Díaz as Melda
- Edder Eloriaga as Casimiro
- Oscar Eugenio as Blasito
- Dacia González as Catalina Ortiz
- Benjamín Islas as Pedro
- Julio Mannino as Dr. Juan Manuel Ríos
- Alejandro Ruiz as Martín Morales
- Xavier Marc as Dr. Agustín Ortiz
- Iliana Montserrat as Biri
- Benjamín Rivero as Fabián
- Oscar Traven as Mr. Richardson
- María Marcela as Lala
- Nancy Patiño as Mariali
- Charly Santana as Juan Simón
- Estrella Lugo as Nely
- Óscar Morelli as Capitán del barco.
- Anna Sobero as Dora Luz
- Héctor Cruz as Valentín
- Mario Moreno del Moral as Miguelito
- Marcia Coutiño as Loretito
- Manrique Ferrer as Robertito
