= Claudia Reyes =

Claudia Reyes may refer to

- Claudia Reyes Larenas, Chilean politician
- Claudia Reyes Montiel (born 1974), Mexican politician, elected for the 18th federal electoral district of the State of Mexico in 2018
- Claudia Reyes (actress), appeared in Enamorada (1999 TV series)
