= Hendrix (film) =

2000 American television film directed by Leon Ichaso

- DVD cover
- Written by: Rob Weiss; Butch Stein; Art Washington; Bruce Rubenstein
- Directed by: Leon Ichaso
- Music by: Daniel Licht; Spencer Proffer; Andrew Rollins; Ron Terry
- Country of origin: United States
- Original language: English

Production
- Producer: Margaret Mitchell
- Cinematography: Bill Butler; Claudio Chea
- Editor: Nancy Richardson
- Running time: 100 minutes
- Production company: MGM Television

Original release
- Release: September 17, 2000

Hendrix is a 2000 American biographical television film directed by Leon Ichaso about the life of Jimi Hendrix. It stars Wood Harris as Hendrix. It was nominated for a Primetime Emmy Award for editing in 2001.

== Cast ==
- Wood Harris as Jimi Hendrix
- Billy Zane as Michael Jeffrey
- Dorian Harewood as Al Hendrix
- Christian Potenza as Chas Chandler
- Vivica A. Fox as Faye Pridgeon
- Kris Holden-Ried as Noel Redding
- Christopher Ralph as Mitch Mitchell
- Michie Mee as Devon Wilson
- Ann Marin as Linda Keith
- Kevin Hanchard as Little Richard
- Derek Aasland as Ginger Baker

== Reception ==
In Variety, Phil Gallo gave the film a negative review, writing:

Jimi Hendrix's life has been pored over so many times that a cursory overview is, at best, questionable and worse, a farce. Hendrix is about as perfunctory as they come, a jaunt through the landmark events of his professional life without the benefit of his music or a lead actor capable of expressing the guitarist's charisma.
