= Mapat L. de Zatarain =

Mexican TV producer

- Born: Martha Patricia López de Zatarain; Puebla, Mexico
- Other names: MaPat López de Zatarain; MaPat
- Occupation: Film/TV producer
- Years active: 1983-present

Mapat L. de Zatarain (born Martha Patricia López de Zatarain in Puebla, Mexico) is a Mexican film producer.

== Filmography ==
Year	Title	Notes
1983	Un solo corazón	Production manager
1984	La pasión de Isabela	Production manager
1985	Abandonada	Production manager
1986	La gloria y el infierno	Production manager
1987	La indomable	Production manager
1988	Dos vidas	Production manager
1992-95	Al derecho y al derbez	Comedy show
1996-97	Luz Clarita	Executive producer
1998	Una luz en el camino	Executive producer
1999	El niño que vino del mar	Executive producer
2001	María Belén	Executive producer
2003	De pocas, pocas pulgas	Executive producer
2005	Piel de otoño	Executive producer
2007-08	Yo amo a Juan Querendón	Executive producer
2008-09	Juro Que Te Amo	Executive producer
2011	Ni contigo ni sin ti	Executive producer
2012-13	La mujer del Vendaval	Executive producer
2014-15	La sombra del pasado	Executive producer
2016	Corazón que miente	Executive producer
2018	Tenías que ser tú	Executive producer

== Awards and nominations ==
=== Premios TVyNovelas ===
Year	Category	Telenovela	Result
2008	Best Telenovela of the Year	Yo amo a Juan Querendón	Nominated
