= Yo amo a Juan Querendón =

Mexican television series

- Genre: Telenovela; Romance; Comedy
- Created by: Luis Felipe Salamanca; Dago García
- Written by: Gabriela Ortigoza; Antonio Abascal; Miguel Vallejo; Juan Carlos Alcalá; Rossana Ruiz; Marimar Oliver; Gonzalo Gutiérrez
- Directed by: Lily Garza; Mauricio Rodríguez
- Starring: Eduardo Santamarina; Mayrín Villanueva; Alexis Ayala
- Theme music composer: Rubén Zepeda
- Opening theme: El Rey Tiburón by Maná; Palomita by Eduardo Antonio
- Ending theme: Baila Cachibombo by Eduardo Antonio
- Country of origin: Mexico
- Original language: Spanish
- No. of episodes: 260

Production
- Executive producer: Mapat L. de Zatarain
- Producer: Marco Vinicio López de Zatarain
- Production locations: Filming; Televisa San Ángel; Mexico City, Mexico; Locations; Cuernavaca, Mexico; Morelos, Mexico; Mexico City, Mexico
- Cinematography: Óscar Morales; Mauricio Manzano
- Camera setup: Multi-camera
- Running time: 21-22 minutes (episodes 1-10); 41-44 minutes (episodes 11-235, 246-260); 61-66 minutes (episodes 236-245)
- Production company: Televisa

Original release
- Network: Canal de las Estrellas
- Release: February 12, 2007 – February 8, 2008

Related
- Pedro El Escamoso (2001); Coração Malandro (2003)

Yo Amo a Juan Querendón (English title: I Love Irresistible Juan) is a Mexican telenovela produced by Mapat L. de Zatarain for Televisa in 2007. The telenovela was a remake of Pedro El Escamoso, a Colombian telenovela. It aired on Canal de las Estrellas from February 12, 2007 to February 8, 2008.

Eduardo Santamarina and Mayrin Villanueva starred as protagonists, while Alexis Ayala, Arleth Terán, Dacia Arcaráz and Renée Varsi starred as antagonists. The leading actress Silvia Pasquel starred as stellar performance. César Évora starred as special participation.

== Plot ==
Juan Dominguez, while walking the streets of Mexico City, comes across an attractive older woman, Nidia Cachon (Sylvia Pasquel). After flirting with her, they proceed to go back to her house. He starts to lose interest when her two daughters, Yadira (Dacia Arcaraz) and Marely (Florencia de Saracho) comes into the house. He instantly falls in love with Marely, quickly losing complete interest in Nidia. Not long after that, Nidia's husband returns home.

Nidia approaches her husband making an excuse as to why Juan is at the house. Her husband quickly dismisses her and calls Juan into his office. All the while, a voice-over of Juan's thoughts is playing, which becomes a running schtick throughout the show. In his office, the husband quickly explains how his life is no longer worth living. He produces a gun and leaves his family in the care of Juan. He then shoots himself in the head.

=== Second Family ===
It is quickly learned, as that the husband had had an affair years previously with a woman named Ana Davila (María Marcela), which produced another daughter, named Paula (Mayrín Villanueva). it is learned that the affair between the late husband and Ana went on for a long time, only ending when the late husband learned that his wife, Nidia, was pregnant with their second child.

=== The Viewing ===
Well before they arrive Ana & Paula, the characters of the Cachon Family begin to show their true colors, and two more characters are introduced. The family lawyer, Alfirio Perefan, (Roberto D’amico) also tries to comfort Nidia, while subtly hinting that he is in love with her

Nidia gets progressively more drunk as the day goes on. She eventually claims that her late husband wanted a Mariachi band playing at his funeral and Juan goes out to find one. Around this time Ana and Paula show up at the viewing. A few minutes after arriving, Nidia notices them and starts to yell at them, telling them they have not right to be there. Ana yells back that they have every right, as Paula is the late man's daughter as well. Nidia makes a few nasty remarks about Ana and they begin to fight. While grabbing and hitting across the top of the coffin, they accidentally knock the coffin to the ground. Marely screams at them to stop. She remarks about how horrible and cruel her mother was being

=== The Will ===
The family has no more money because the late husband had donated it. He left the house to Paula and Ana. Nidia used her relationship with the lawyer to get him to make a fake copy of the will, saying the late husband left Paula and Ana nothing.

=== Empresas Farell ===
Paula had been attending university in the United States. She returned to Mexico to be with her mother. She tells her mother that she wants to look for a job and live in Mexico either with or near her mother. She finds a job with a company called Empresas Farell, a food distributor. She would become Vice President and help find vendors for the company.

At the same time, Juan, who has been living in the Cachon household, decided to get a job, since the family no longer had any money. Juan gets the job as chauffeur with Empresas Farel, but in order to empress Marely, he tells the Cachon family that he is actually a lawyer with the company. He becomes Paula's chauffeur and falls in love with her as well.

When Paula was hired at Empresas Farell, the president of the company, Cesar Luis Farell, took an instant liking to her. Paula learns Cesar Luis's is married. It is learned not long after that that Ivonne and Cesar Luis are having an affair.

In the meantime, Juan makes friends with one of the other company chauffeurs, Fernando.

=== Paula Marries Cesar Luis ===
Paula falls in love with him and thinks he's already divorcing Monica. But because he can't work up the courage to break with his wife, he keeps living with her but makes excuses for rarely being at home, saying he is working late a lot. Monica begins to suspect Paula since she is working 24/7 with him Monica phones him and says she has something very important to tell him. says that she's pregnant.

Cesar Luis is shocked by this news. He decides to stay with Monica and cool it with Paula. Paula is heartbroken when she finds out through the office gossip that Monica is pregnant. Cesar Luis makes excuses to Paula and tries to keep her affections, but Paula is furious saying he lied to her all along. She finds a rebound in Juan, who has fallen in love with her and they become an instant couple. They agree to keep it subtle due to their jobs (she is VP and he is her chauffeur). Then at a company party, Cesar Luis, with Monica at his side, sees Paula and Juan together. Paula flirts blatantly with Juan in front of Cesar Luis. He goes crazy with jealousy and the next day fights with Juan in the Farell parking garage until they are both bleeding and bruised. After they fight, they agree to keep it from Paula and shake hands like gentlemen, but they still loath each other. Monica has a miscarriage and relies heavily on Paula for support, since Monica views Paula as a trusted friend. Not long after the miscarriage, Ceser Luis decides to tell Monica the truth about the affair between himself and Paula, and she asks for a divorce. She vows to make them suffer for all the pain and deception they caused.

After much seducing and despite her mother's warnings, Paula is again beguiled by Cesar Luis and they get married in a small church ceremony. Cesar Luis persuades Paula to quit the company and stay home (presumably so he can continue his office affairs without his new wife knowing). Monica sees an opportunity for revenge and decides to use her majority interest in the company to become VP, the same job Paula held when Monica was the stay-at-home wife. Juan runs into Paula and acts formal and distant. She asks why and he says she is a married woman. Paula becomes spiteful and tells him Juan that she never loved him and just flirted with him to make Cesar Luis jealous. Juan is crushed and leaves Mexico City.

Cesar Luis and Paula return from their honeymoon and Cesar Luis confesses to his secretary Ivonne that it wasn't that hot. He rekindles things with Ivonne and also is flirting with his ex-wife Monica who is now VP of Farell. Paula suspects he is having affairs & is consumed by insecurity. Her sister Marely works as a receptionist at Farell and spies on Monica and Cesar Luis. Cesar Luis complains that Paula has started to annoy him with her nagging and strong will. Paula and Cesar Luis argue and Paula decides to moves in with her Mom. Cesar Luis comes and orders her back home, but Paula's mom says he has no authority in her house and that the decision is up to Paula, not him. Paula stays but tells Cesar Luis it is only temporary. Monica, sensing the cracks in the marriage, sends a woman to befriend Paula and start a home-based business with her, but really to spy on Paula. Paula confesses to her mom and new "friend" that she regrets marrying Cesar Luis, that he is not the person she thought he was. She goes to bed dreaming of Juan. Later Paula gets a call from Juan and tries to tell him she misses him and loves him. But Juan tells her off for playing with his feelings and hangs up on her. Paula's new "friend" reports all of this back to Monica.

=== Juan Leaves the City ===
Nidia, who has since married Perefan, rekindles an old relationship at the wedding of Paula and Cesar Luis. She thinks she might be pregnant and starts panicking. Due to her strange behavior her family thinks she has terminal cancer. But she finds out what she thought was pregnancy is just indigestion. She starts seeing her ex while Perefan is at work. One day Perefan walks in on them at home, and she says he is just a friend paying a friendly visit and yells at him to go back to work. Yadira and Enrique get married (even though she tries to split through the whole ceremony) and Yadira gets pregnant and has a baby girl.

Meanwhile, Juan has gone back to his hometown of Achichipico with no money or prospects. On the road he meets a rich old Japanese businessman named Yasomoto whose car has died. He fixes Yasomoto's car and they agree to become business partners selling flowers grown in Achichipico. When he returns to town with this news everyone thinks Juan is rich too and greets him as a returned hero and benefactor. They stay with a greedy widow who realizes that it's Yasomoto who is rich, she seduces him and begs him to marry her (even though neither understands a word the other is saying). To convince him to marry she starts to have sex with him and he dies of a heart attack. Juan calls the relatives in Japan (saying only Yasomoto sayonara) his daughter gets the idea and flies in for his funeral. She is very sad but agrees her father's project should continue and keeps funding Juan's business.

Also Juan discovers he has a son (7 years old) from an ex-girlfriend who died soon after. His son Juanito is being raised by relatives. He quickly bonds with his son who looks and acts just like Juan. Juan tries to avoid another ex-girlfriend Erlinda whom he jilted when they were teenagers. Erlinda follows him around crying wearing a black shroud, and her brothers are always plotting to kill or at least beat up Juan. But Juan always quick-talks them out of it and becomes a town leader. Juan meets a beautiful lawyer named Susana who falls in love with him and they go on romantic excursions together. But Erlinda tries to sabotage his budding romance with Susana, intercepting their love notes, and kissing Juan pretending to be Susana. Juan pursues the tearful Susana and they figure out it's a trick. Then they have passionate sex but Juan subconsciously calls out Paula's name. Juan does not know it but Susana realizes he's still in love with Paula.

So Susana goes to another town but leaves him a sweet goodbye note saying he is a wonderful person and she hopes he will return someday to "his Paula". In the end, Paula and Juan marry.

== Cast ==
=== Main ===
- Eduardo Santamarina as Juan Dominguez Coral
- Mayrin Villanueva as Paula Dávila Escobar de Farell/Paula Cachon Davila de Dominguez
- Alexis Ayala as César Luis Farell Carballo/Sandro Arenas
- Arleth Terán as Ivonne Mosquera Espejo
- Dacia Arcaráz as Yadira del Pilar Cachon de la Cueva
- Renée Varsi as Mónica Berrocal Toledo de Farell
- Silvia Pasquel as Nidia Estela de la Cueva Perez Vda. de Cachon
- Maria Marcela as Ana Dávila Escobar
- Roberto D'Amico as Alirio Perafan Rocha de Francisco
- Florencia de Saracho as Marely Cachon de la Cueva

=== Supporting ===
- Pedro Romo as Pastor Gaitán García
- Arturo Barba as Fernando Lara Lora
- Eugenio Bartilotti as Enrique Bueno Lindo
- Alejandra Meyer as Pastora García
- Roberto Miguel as Gonzalo Gutiérrez
- Roberto Sen as Angarita Calvo García
- Ángeles Balvanera as Consuelo
- Alejandra Barros as Susana
- Anel Norena as Delfina
- Sharis Cid as Yolanda Calleja
- Nancy Taira as Sun Yu Yamamoto
- Santiago Hernández as Juanito Dominguez
- Tania Vazquez as Herlinda
- Oscar Ferretti as Ezzio de Lorenz
- Néstor Emmanuel as Luis Dávila
- Yolanda Ventura as Laura Berrocal
- Eduardo Antonio as Molondrón
- Alex Sirvent as Héctor
- Lisardo as Fred dl Castro
- Luz María Aguilar as Pepita Pomposo
- Pedro Armendáriz Jr. as Don Plutarco
- Víctor Luis Zúñiga as Pedro "Pedrinchi"
- Marisol González Casas as Hillary Paris
- Samuel Gallegos as Custodio
- Luis Ceballos as Nacho Rodriguez
- Claudia Elisa Aguilar as Profesor Gómez
- Gastón Tusset as Lorenzo Pomposo

Special participation

- César Évora as Samuel Cachon
- Mapat L. de Zatarain as Herself
- Pablo Montero as Himself
- René Strickler as Himself
- Kelchie Arizmendi as Nurse
- Ricardo Vera as Profesor Tello
- Marco Muñoz as Enrique
- Tania Amezcua as La Coqueta
- Martha Sabrina as Hugo's fiancée
- Lidice Pousa as Lorena

== Awards ==
Year	Award	Category	Nominee	Result
2007	Presea Luminaria de Oro	Performance Recognition	Eduardo Santamarina	Won
2008	26th TVyNovelas Awards	Best Telenovela of the Year	Mapat L. de Zatarain	Nominated
2008	26th TVyNovelas Awards	Best Actress	Mayrin Villanueva	Nominated
2008	26th TVyNovelas Awards	Best Actor	Eduardo Santamarina	Nominated
2008	26th TVyNovelas Awards	Best Co-lead Actress	Silvia Pasquel	Nominated
2008	26th TVyNovelas Awards	Best Co-lead Actor	Eugenio Bartilotti	Nominated
2008	Premios ACE	Female Face of the Year	Silvia Pasquel	Won
2008	Premios Bravo	Female Generic Stellar Performance	Silvia Pasquel	Won
