= Leon Ichaso =

Cuban-born American writer and film director (1948–2023)

- Publicity Photo of Leon Ichaso
- Born: August 3, 1948; Havana, Cuba
- Died: May 21, 2023 (aged 74); Santa Monica, California, U.S.

Leon Ichaso (August 3, 1948 – May 21, 2023) was a Cuban-born American writer and film director. Some of his prominent works included El Super, Crossover Dreams, Bitter Sugar, Piñero, and El Cantante.

== Biography ==
=== Early life ===
Leon Ichaso was born in Havana, Cuba on August 3, 1948. Ichaso migrated to Mexico at the age of 14, then to the United States with his mother Antonia Ichaso and sister Mari Rodriguez Ichaso. His father, poet and journalist Justo Rodriguez Santos, who had affiliations with the Orígenes literary group, initially stayed behind in Cuba to support the Cuban Revolution. Five years later, Ichaso's father joined his family in New York City.

=== Career ===
As a director, Leon Ichaso's first movie was the Spanish-language feature El Super (1979), based on an Off-Broadway play about an immigrant building superintendent trying to make his way in New York, which he co-directed with Orlando Jiménez Leal.

When entering the Hollywood scene, Ichaso told stories of the big city slotted into action series on TV (e.g., Miami Vice, Crime Story, The Equalizer) and TV movies such as The Fear Inside, The Take, A Table at Ciro's and A Kiss to Die For. Ichaso later directed Wesley Snipes's Sugar Hill (1994), a character study wedded to a violent crime drama of a New York drug empire.

Ichaso made Azúcar Amarga (Bitter Sugar), a Spanish language film about a disillusioned Cuban Communist, in the Dominican Republic and Cuba in 1996. According to César A. Salgado, "the film registers the impact, at the human level, of neoliberal globalization on a Cuba made harrowingly vulnerable after losing the Soviet subsidies that had made its brand of socialism more or less sustainable for thirty years."

For the next several years, Ichaso worked on several TV movies, some of which were adaptations of plays. Zooman (Showtime, 1995) was an adaptation of an Off-Broadway play dealing with a family coping with the murder of a child. Execution of Justice (Showtime, 1999) was also derived from a play of the same name by Emily Mann which detailed the events behind the murders of San Francisco mayor, George Moscone, and supervisor, Harvey Milk.

Ichaso next directed small screen biographies Ali: An American Hero (Fox, 2000) and Hendrix (Showtime, 2000). He later wrote and directed Piñero (2001), a biographical movie about the life of Nuyorican author Miguel Piñero.

After working for Showtime (Sleeper Cell, 2005), Cane, The Cleaner (A&E), Persons Unknown (Fox/Televisa 2008 and 2009), developing his own future projects ("Monk"), and teaching movie directing in France, Ichaso started working on the screenplay of salsa singer, Héctor Lavoe's, biography, El Cantante in 2004. This movie was shot in 2006 and stars Jennifer Lopez and Marc Anthony.

His last movie Paraiso, was filmed in Miami in 2008 and opened during the 2009 Miami International Film Festival in March 2009.

=== Death ===
Ichaso died of a heart attack in Santa Monica, California, on May 21, 2023. He had successfully beaten cancer two years prior.

== Filmography ==
León Ichaso directed several feature films, including films made for television. This is a partial list.

Directed features
Year	Title	Distributor
1979	El Super	New Yorker Films
1985	Crossover Dreams	New Yorker Films
1992	The Fear Inside	Viacom Productions
1994	Sugar Hill	20th Century Fox
1996	Azúcar Amarga	(None)— Self distributed
2000	Ali: An American Hero	Fox Television Studios
2000	Hendrix	MGM Television
2001	Piñero	Miramax Films
2006	El Cantante	Picturehouse
