= María Belén =

Mexican children's telenovela from 2001

- Genre: Telenovela
- Created by: Julio Porter
- Written by: Martha Oláiz; Tania Bertrán; Antonio Abascal; Rossana Ruiz
- Directed by: Lily Garza; Arturo García Tenorio
- Starring: Nora Salinas; Rene Lavan; Maya Mishalska; Antonio Medellín; Harry Geithner; Xavier Marc; Luis Xavier; Danna Paola
- Theme music composer: Rubén Zepeda
- Opening theme: "María Belén" by Danna Paola and Rabanitos Verdes
- Composer: Luis Alberto Diazayas
- Country of origin: Mexico
- Original language: Spanish
- No. of episodes: 90

Production
- Executive producer: Mapat L. de Zatarain
- Producer: Marco Vinicio
- Camera setup: Multi-camera
- Production company: Televisa

Original release
- Network: Las Estrellas
- Release: August 13 – December 14, 2001

María Belén is a Mexican children's telenovela produced by Mapat L. de Zatarain for Televisa. It aired on Canal de las Estrellas from August 13, 2001, to December 14, 2001, and starred Nora Salinas, Rene Lavan, and Danna Paola.

== Plot ==
María Belén is a six-year-old girl who recently lost her adoptive parents in a tragic accident. She has stayed with her uncle Rogelio, an ambitious and evil man, who planned this accident to take over the inheritance of his half brother Alfonso García Marín, but he did not take into account the possibility that María Belén escaped unharmed from the catastrophe and, much less, that she was just the universal heiress of Alfonso's assets. That is why now Rogelio has to hide the girl to fulfill his goal. María Belén arrives as a student at the Brighton Institute, a place run by Úrsula Arana, because Rogelio manages to convince her with money to keep her living there, promising that he will return later for her, although those are not his true intentions. Ursula is a bitter and malicious woman who has had to work in that place to maintain her social position, but in no way enjoys the company of girls. Her arrival at the Brighton Institute marks the fate of María Belén, because right there she will meet her real father: Pablo Díaz Cortázar.

Six years ago, when Pablo was still studying and, at the same time, working to maintain his studies, he met a beautiful girl named Alejandra Medrano. Both fell in love and, although they established a sweet and simple relationship, this had to end because Pablo received a scholarship abroad to increase his studies. Alejandra was the one who most convinced Pablo to take that opportunity, seeing disinterestedly for the benefit of her beloved without knowing that in those moments she was pregnant with a child from him. Pablo left, not knowing that later on Alejandra would give birth to a beautiful girl and die shortly after giving birth. This is how María Belén was adopted by the García Marín family. Pablo managed to find out about this situation once he returned to Mexico, but unfortunately for him there was no information that could take him to his daughter. In the present, he has been desperately looking for the little girl for four years, without success. Now, the only thing that brings happiness to his life is Ana del Río, his current girlfriend, a sweet and loving woman who works as a psychologist at the Brighton Institute.

Úrsula Arana has lived for many years obsessed with the love of Pablo Díaz Cortázar, who, ever since he worked in a newspaper under the orders of her father, always rejected her. The newspaper went bankrupt and Ursula lost track of Pablo, but not her obsession with him. It is now when Úrsula, without knowing it, has the possibility of giving Pablo what he most desires in his life: to find his little daughter, María Belén. María Belén does not know that she has a father who seeks her, but her need to have a family will grow along with the evils and tricks that Úrsula constantly commits against her. Even in a situation so adverse to her young age, María Belén has a cheerful and positive character that will allow her to make great friends that will help her to fill her life with love.

== Cast ==
=== Main ===
- Nora Salinas as Ana del Río
- Rene Lavan as Pablo Díaz Cortázar
- Maya Mishalska as Úrsula Araña
- Antonio Medellín as Refugio "Don Cuco"
- Harry Geithner as Rogelio García Juárez
- Xavier Marc as Adolfo Serrano
- Luis Xavier as Antonio Sanz
- Danna Paola as María Belén
- Marcela Páez as Claudia del Río
- María Marcela as Lucrecia Campos
- Dacia Arcaráz as Malena Cataño
- Alejandra Barros as Valeria Montaño de Sanz
- Yurem Rojas as Bruno Sanz Montaño
- Mónica Prado as Hilda Manríquez de Serrano
- Graciela Bernardos as Trinidad Gutiérrez
- Héctor Parra as Raúl Trujillo
- Cristiane Aguinaga as Deborah Tamargo
- Irina Wilkins as Romina Cortés Mena
- Natush as Evelyn
- Marijose Valverde as Socorro
- René Casados as Jorge
- Patricio Borghetti as Ángel

=== Recurring ===
- Mariana Karr as Lolita
- Antonio Escobar as Ramiro Benegas
- Miguel Priego as Félix Gamez
- Elizabeth Arciniega as Lic. Laura Paola Rocha
- Jorge Ortín as José Zaragoza "Pepe"
- Evelyn Solares as Camila
- Oscar Ferretti as Aurelio Suárez
- Hanny Sáenz as Montserrat
- Arturo Barba as Polo
- Yousi Díaz as Norma Malpica
- Adriana Laffan as Margarita
- Gustavo Negrete as Gastón
- Sara Monar as Mercedes
- Eugenia Avendaño as Eduviges
- Mariana Sánchez as Gloria
- Paulina Martell as Pirueta
- Esteban Franco as Fidelio
- Rebeca Manríquez as Gabriela
- Benjamín Islas as Tiburcio
- Claudia Elisa Aguilar as Rosa

=== Guest stars ===
- Mary Paz Banquells as Patricia Pineda de García
- Alfredo Adame as Alfonso García Marín
