= Tenías que ser tú (2018 TV series) =

Television series

- Genre: Telenovela
- Based on: Ámbar by Daniella Castagno
- Screenplay by: Antonio Abascal; Carlos Daniel González; Dante Hernández
- Directed by: Nelhiño Acosta; José Elías Moreno Jr.
- Starring: Ariadne Díaz; Andrés Palacios; Arturo Peniche; Chantal Andere; Grettell Valdez
- Opening theme: "Me Niego" by Reik featuring Ozuna and Wisin
- Country of origin: Mexico
- Original language: Spanish
- No. of seasons: 1
- No. of episodes: 87

Production
- Executive producer: Mapat L. de Zatarain
- Production locations: Mexico City; Puebla
- Camera setup: Multi-camera
- Production company: Televisa

Original release
- Network: Las Estrellas
- Release: 12 March – 8 July 2018

Tenías que ser tú (English: It Had To Be You) is a Mexican telenovela produced by Mapat L. de Zatarain that premiered on Las Estrellas on 12 March 2018 and ended on 8 July 2018. It is an adaptation of the Chilean telenovela titled Ámbar created by Daniella Castagno. It stars Ariadne Díaz, Andrés Palacios and Fernando Alonso.

The production of the telenovela began on January 8, 2018.

== Plot ==
The telenovela tells the story of Marisa and her 8-year-old daughter, Nicole, who live in Villahermosa with grandmother María Elena and nana Jaquie, but their lives change when a job opportunity for Marisa, in the Real Estate business, takes them to move to Mexico City.

== Cast ==
=== Main ===
- Ariadne Díaz as Marisa Santiesteban Elorza
- Andrés Palacios as Miguel "Miky" Carreto
- Arturo Peniche as Ezequiel Pineda Domínguez
- Chantal Andere as Lorenza
- Grettell Valdez as Jenifer Pineda Salgado "Jeny"
- Fernando Alonso as Marcelo Moret
- Rossana Nájera as Amaranta
- Ana Paula Martínez as Nicole Santiesteban Elorza
- Ricardo Margaleff as Bryan
- Polo Morín as Bruno
- Raquel Garza as Amanda
- Agustín Arana as Tadeo Fernández
- Sachi Tamashiro as Jaquie
- Valentina de los Cobos as Lucy
- Emilio Beltrán as Santiago
- Jessica Decote as Lesly
- Aldo Guerra as Tino Carreto
- Karla Farfán as Paulina
- Dayren Chávez as Simona
- Mónica Zorti
- Elena Lizárraga as Olga
- Paola Toyos
- María Marcela as Marbella
- Nubia Martí as La Nena

=== Special guest stars ===
- Latin Lover as Willy
- Roberto Miquel
- Arturo Vázquez
- Wendy Braga
- Janina Hidalgo
- Kelchie Arizmendi as Julia

== Ratings ==
Viewership and ratings per season of Tenías que ser tú
Season	Episodes	First aired		Last aired		Avg. viewers (millions)
Season	Episodes	Date	Viewers (millions)	Date	Viewers (millions)	Avg. viewers (millions)
1	87	12 March 2018	3.5	8 July 2018	3.4	2.74

== Episodes ==
No.	Title	Original release date	Mexico viewers (millions)
1	"Marisa y Nicole empiezan una nueva vida"	12 March 2018	3.5
The life of Marisa and Nicole changes completely with their arrival in the city, Nicole only wants to meet her dad. The superstitions of Marbella prevent, for the third time, from marrying Ezequiel.
2	"Miky se gana la confianza de Marisa"	13 March 2018	3.2
Miky defends Marisa, who has no choice but to trust him to take Nicole to school. Marcelo confesses to Marisa that he looked for her for a long time after the relationship they had.
3	"Marisa finge ser novia de Micky"	14 March 2018	3.2
Nicole starts looking for her dad. Marcelo discovers that Marisa has a daughter, to prevent him from looking for her, Marisa invents that she has a relationship with Miky, who steals her a kiss.
4	"Marisa tiene una nueva rival, Amaranta"	15 March 2018	3.3
Nicole tells Miky of her desire to find her dad. Amaranta discovers that Marcelo has preferences with Marisa and is willing to harm her. Jeny plans to wait longer and ends her relationship with Miky.
5	"Marcelo es el papá de Nicole"	16 March 2018	3.2
Marisa confesses to her mother that Marcelo is Nicole's father, to prevent him from taking her away, she decides to keep the secret. Miky does not want to lose Jeny and proposes marriage.
6	"Nicole piensa que su papá es Miky"	19 March 2018	2.7
Lesly ends with Tino. Marisa's lie gets out of control, Marcelo learns that Miky is going to marry another woman, while Nicole is happy to believe that she finally found her father.
7	"Jeny no quiere ver Marisa cerca de Miky"	20 March 2018	2.9
Marisa does not dare to confess to Marcelo who is the father of Nicole. Jeny is sure that Miky likes Marisa and asks him to avoid keeping in touch with her. Marisa runs the risk of losing her daughter.
8	"Jeny se enfrenta a Marisa"	21 March 2018	3.0
Jeny makes a scandal at Marisa's house to demand an explanation for taking her boyfriend and asks her to leave him alone. Lorenza is tired of Tadeo's promises and asks for a divorce.
9	"Jeny está a punto de perder el amor de Miky"	22 March 2018	2.8
Tadeo has a plan to recover his wife. Jeny has become controlling and jealous unbearable, Miky asks her for time to think things through. Marisa resigns because she wants to return to Villahermosa.
10	"Miky le pide a Marisa que no se vaya"	23 March 2018	2.5
Amaranta blackmails Marcelo remembering that Eva, her best friend, died in circumstances that were compromising for him. Marisa looks for Miky to say goodbye, but they can not resist a kiss.
11	"Jeny le pide ayuda a Marcelo"	26 March 2018	2.6
Lesly is about to return with Tino. Jeny looks for Marcelo to ask him to help her get Marisa away from Miky. Amanda intends to be like a mother to the children of Ezequiel.
12	"Marisa le confiesa su secreto a Miky"	27 March 2018	2.9
Lorenza is disappointed of Tadeo when discovering that his change was a show mounted by him and Brayan. Marisa reveals to Miky that Marcelo is Nicole's dad and is not willing to share her daughter.
13	"Marcelo descubre que Nicole es su hija"	28 March 2018	2.7
Marisa can not continue lying, so before leaving, she decides to talk to Marcelo to confess that Nicole is his daughter. Jeny and Miky make the decision to advance their wedding.
14	"Marcelo no permitirá que Marisa lo aleje de Nicole"	29 March 2018	2.1
Ezequiel is already Amanda's boyfriend, but his children do not accept her. Marisa postpones the trip, because Marcelo is willing to demand his rights over Nicole and will not allow them to leave the city.
15	"Marisa debe comprobar que Nicole es hija de Marcelo"	30 March 2018	2.2
Lorenza will not return home until Tadeo finds work and takes responsibility for his family. Marcelo needs to be sure that Nicole is his daughter, and asks Marisa for a DNA test.
16	"Nicole se entera que Marcelo es su papá"	2 April 2018	2.8
Marcelo confirms that Nicole is his daughter, while Marisa is scared because the moment to confess to Nicole who her dad is has arrived. Jeny is sure that Marisa is in love with Miky.
17	"Marcelo no es el papá que Nicole imaginaba"	3 April 2018	2.8
Jeny confirms that Miky likes Marisa. Nicole accepts that Marcelo is not the dad she always dreamed about, because she thought it would be like Miky. Marcelo wants to recover the lost years with his daughter.
18	"Miky acepta que está enamorado de Marisa"	4 April 2018	2.8
Marcelo is willing to recognize Nicole and wants her to carry his last names. Miky is upset to see that Nicole is happy with her parents, finally admits in front of Jeny that he is in love with Marisa.
19	"Miky pierde la memoria"	5 April 2018	2.9
Miky falls unconscious after receiving a blow from Jeny, so he is taken to the hospital, where they discover that he has lost his memory. Marbella asks Marisa to leave Miky in peace.
20	"Marisa le confiesa su amor a Miky"	6 April 2018	3.0
For the good of all, Marisa tries to get away from Miky, but he confesses that he has not stopped thinking about her. Jeny advises Marcelo to keep Nicole away from Miky.
21	"Miky se enfrenta con Marcelo"	9 April 2018	3.1
Amanda is committed to Ezquiel. Marcelo wants to take Nicole to school, but Marisa does not allow it and Miky decides to confront him. Tadeo wants to leave the house.
22	"Nicole no acepta que Marcelo sea su papá"	10 April 2018	2.8
Bruno discovers that Pau cheated and Lesly remains as queen of the kermesse. Marcelo makes a pact with Marisa to get along. Nicole asks Miky to accompany her to the school dance.
23	"Jeny quiere tener un hijo de Miky"	11 April 2018	3.7
Nicole decides to go to the father-daughter dance with Miky, Marcelo becomes enraged when he finds out. Simona does not want to be Pau's friend anymore. Jeny talks to Miky about having children.
24	"Amaranta planea alejar a Marisa de Marcelo"	12 April 2018	3.0
Amanda denounces Marbella to be fined for the sale of her cakes. Amaranta wants to destroy Marisa so that she stays away from Marcelo.
25	"Miky le confiesa a Jeny su amor por Marisa"	13 April 2018	3.1
Miky accepts in front of Jeny that he cares about Marisa more than he thought. Ezequiel discovers how important Marbella is. Marcelo warns Miky that he does not want to see him near Marisa and Nicole.
26	"Marcelo decide luchar por el amor de Marisa"	16 April 2018	2.7
Marcelo declares his feelings to Marisa and proposes to be together again so that Nicole has a real family, Marisa rejects him and he intends to fight to win her back.
27	"¿Miky siente celos de Marcelo?"	17 April 2018	2.9
Amaranta makes Marcelo believe that Eva did not die. Marbella and Ezequiel recover their friendship and she reveals the cause for which she canceled their wedding. Miky asks Marcelo to make Nicole happy.
28	"Marcelo cree que Eva está viva"	18 April 2018	2.8
Jaquie does not want Brayan to remain her representative, she ends his courtship. Marcelo continues to suspect that Eva did not die and decides to investigate. Jeny warns Marisa that she will fight for Miky.
29	"Miky es el hombre con el que Marisa quiere estar toda su vida"	19 April 2018	3.1
Marcelo suspects that someone wants to extort money. Marisa tells La Nena that Miky is the man she would like to spend the rest of her life with. Miky prefers to keep distance with Marisa.
30	"Miky está convencido de casarse con Jeny"	20 April 2018	2.9
Marisa feels confused and to finish with the doubts, she decides to ask Miky if he is sure to marry Jeny. The bond of affection between Nicole and Marcelo is getting stronger every day.
31	"Marisa se niega a darle una oportunidad a Marcelo"	23 April 2018	2.9
Marcelo prepares a surprise for Marisa and with the help of Nicole, asks for an opportunity to be together again. Ezequiel, Tadeo, and Brayan are confused with thieves and are arrested.
32	"Marcelo investiga si Eva murió"	24 April 2018	2.9
Marcelo asks an investigator to find out if Eva died together with his father in a tragic accident and the news he receives strongly surprised him and made him nervous.
33	"Nicole descubre que Marisa está enamorada de Miky"	25 April 2018	2.6
Marisa declares her love to Miky and manages to confuse him, he does not know if it is okay to marry Jeny because he can not stop thinking about Marisa. Nicole tells Marisa that she already knows how she feels about Miky.
34	"Marcelo quiere reconocer legalmente a Nicole"	26 April 2018	2.8
Marisa decides to leave Miky definitively. Lesly learns that Tino kissed Simona. Marcelo believes that it is time to give his last name to Nicole and proposes to Marisa to start the process.
35	"Jeny invita a Marisa a su boda con Miky"	27 April 2018	2.7
Marbella learns that her husband had a lover. Lesly decides to finish with Tino. Jeny discovers that Miky will be meet secretly with Marisa and decides to take this moment to invite her to her wedding.
36	"Miky decide empezar una nueva vida lejos de Marisa"	30 April 2018	2.2
Miky agrees to start a new life with Jeny and live away from Marisa, so he will have to leave his job as a driver, Nicole asks him not to leave. Jeny has her bachelorette party.
37	"Jeny no está segura de casarse"	1 May 2018	2.8
Jeny advises Lesly not to let Tino go. The day of the wedding arrived, Jeny does not know if Miky loves her enough and before arriving at the ceremony she discovers that she is not sure of getting married.
38	"Miky se casa con Jeny"	2 May 2018	3.0
After Jeny's nervous breakdown, Miky decides to marry and leave behind what he feels for Marisa. La Nena warns Marisa that Amaranta could get Marcelo if she does not do something about it.
39	"Marcelo está dispuesto a todo por reconquistar a Marisa"	3 May 2018	2.9
Ezequiel wants to return to Marbella but Amanda does not intend to leave him free. Jeny and Miky return from their honeymoon. Marcelo shows Marisa that he is willing to do everything to conquer her.
40	"Marcelo le pide una oportunidad a Marisa"	4 May 2018	2.8
Miky assures Jeny that he has stopped caring for Marisa. Marcelo surprises Marisa with his attitude, asks her to allow him to be by her side once more and they are discovered by Nicole while they kiss.
41	"Miky desea tener un hijo con Jeny"	7 May 2018	2.7
Nicole is surprised to see her parents kissing, but Marisa clarifies that everything was a confusion. Miky thinks it's time to become a dad. Marbella learns that Tino is Miky's brother.
42	"Miky se entera que Tino es su hermano"	8 May 2018	2.5
Nicole begins to carry the surname of Marcelo. Marbella can not continue lying to Tino and before he leaves, she tells him that his father is Ramón. Miky finds out that he has a brother.
43	"Amaranta y Eva se unen para vengarse de Marcelo"	9 May 2018	2.5
Tino is ashamed of his mother's lies and does not want to go return to Marbella's home. Lorenza asks Marisa to stay away from Marcelo. Amaranta convinces Eva to take revenge against Marcelo.
44	"Marcelo despierta los celos de Roque"	10 May 2018	1.7
Marcelo faints in the office, which causes Marisa to worry about him and decide to take care of him, until Amaranta intervenes. Roque believes that Amaranta cheats on him with Marcelo.
45	"Nicole está perdida"	11 May 2018	2.6
Amaranta proposes to Miky to separate Marisa and Marcelo. Nicole and Santi manage to escape from school to start the plan with which Marcelo could conquer Marisa, but it does not happen as planned.
46	"Miky encuentra a Nicole"	14 May 2018	2.5
Santi confesses the plan of Nicole to unite to her parents, but it did not work as they wanted and she got lost. Marisa and Marcelo continue looking for their daughter, but it is Miky who manages to find her.
47	"Marisa le da una oportunidad a Marcelo"	15 May 2018	2.5
Jeny can not bear to know that Miky is in love with another woman and explodes to hear him talk about Marisa while he was asleep. After feeling rejected, Marisa decides to give Marcelo a chance.
48	"Nicole y Marcelo sufren un terrible accidente"	16 May 2018	2.6
Miky warns Marisa that she has a rival, since Amaranta is interested in Marcelo. On the way home, Marcelo suffers a faint that causes a serious accident, but Miky arrives to help them.
49	"Amaranta se entera que Marisa tiene una relación con Marcelo"	17 May 2018	2.6
Marcelo is treated after the accident he suffered along with Nicole, while Miky is responsible for notifying Marisa. In the hospital, Marisa confronts Amaranta and defends her relationship with Marcelo.
50	"Marcelo se entera que tiene un tumor en la cabeza"	18 May 2018	2.7
The results of Marcelo's studies indicate that he has a tumor on his head that could be very serious. Jeny and Miky spend their first romantic weekend.
51	"Lesly acepta ser novia de Bruno"	21 May 2018	2.5
Nicole finds Eva's picture among Marcelo's things, when she asks who it is, he reveals that she was a friend but prefers not to talk about her anymore. Bruno asks Lesly to be his girlfriend.
52	"Tino se enfrenta con Miky"	22 May 2018	2.7
After listening to Lesly talk about her love for Bruno, Tino retaliates with Miky because he does not respect his marriage to Jeny. Miky is willing to try everything for Jeny's happiness.
53	"Amaranta no acepta que Marisa dirija la empresa de Marcelo"	23 May 2018	2.6
Amaranta is desperate to regain control of Marcelo's company and looks for Eva to ask for help. After seeing Marisa, Miky tells Jeny that he will not accept work in San Miguel.
54	"Marcelo hace creer a Marisa que le queda poco tiempo de vida"	24 May 2018	2.4
Marcelo faces Amaranta to find out what she was doing at Eva's house. The results of Marcelo's studies indicate that the tumor is benign, but he decides to make Marisa believe that he has cancer.
55	"Jeny intenta salvar su matrimonio"	25 May 2018	2.8
Marcelo asks Marisa to keep his illness a secret. Marbella is about to unmask Amanda. Jeny can not convince Miky to fight for their marriage and decides to get away from him.
56	"Marisa está dispuesta a apoyar a Marcelo"	28 May 2018	2.5
Marbella decides to turn her life around after seeing Ezequiel kissing Amanda. Jeny begs Miky to stay away from Marisa, while Marisa convinces Marcelo to seek another medical opinion.
57	"Marcelo le pide a Marisa que se case con él"	29 May 2018	2.4
Marisa is convinced that Marcelo has little time to live, so he takes the opportunity to propose marriage. Miky loses control and tells Jeny that his mistake was to have married her.
58	"Miky le confiesa a Marbella que está enamorado de Marisa"	30 May 2018	2.7
Marisa does not want to marry Marcelo because she loves Miky. Marbella is the victim of a scam. Miky accepts that he is in love with Marisa and does not intend to continue pretending with Jeny.
59	"Marisa le pide a Miky que luchen por su amor"	31 May 2018	2.2
Marisa is still firm in her decision, she does not want to marry Marcelo because she is completely in love with Miky, so she proposes to fight for their love. Miky decides to confess to Jeny that he does not love her anymore.
60	"Marisa acepta que Marcelo viva con ella"	1 June 2018	2.5
Marcelo asks Marisa to let him live with Nicole for the little time he has left of his life. Despite the love he feels for Marisa, Miky decides to fight for his marriage and go live with Jeny.
61	"Jeny le pone un alto a Marisa"	4 June 2018	2.7
Nicole gets mad at Miky after learning that he will live far away. Jeny returns to Marisa's house ready to defend her marriage and beats her to demand that she not get involved with Miky again.
62	"Miky se despide del transporte escolar"	5 June 2018	2.5
Marcelo uses his last resort to get Marisa to marry him. Miky leaves his job at school to fulfill his promise to get away from Marisa and starts a new life with Jeny.
63	"Jeny sospecha que está embarazada"	6 June 2018	2.3
Marisa confesses to Nicole that Marcelo's illness is very serious. When Miky is about to remember how he feels about Marisa, Jeny confesses that she might be pregnant.
64	"Jeny decide separarse de Miky"	7 June 2018	2.6
Jeny confirms that she is not pregnant, living this situation makes her understand that she does not want to continue with Miky. Lorenza discovers Amaranta's plans against Marisa and advises her to confront her.
65	"Marisa y Miky se reencuentran"	8 June 2018	2.6
Marisa confronts Amaranta for the embezzlement of which she was accused. Jeny and Miky return from the failed attempt to recover their marriage. Marisa can not stay away from Miky and is reunited with him.
66	"Marisa pierde el control de su auto y sufre un grave accidente"	11 June 2018	2.6
Despite the great love she feels for Miky, Marisa is willing to continue alongside Marcelo. While driving her car, Marisa loses control and suffers a serious accident.
67	"La vida de Marisa corre peligro"	12 June 2018	2.7
After suffering a strong car accident, Marisa is transferred to the hospital, but doctors do not give good news, because Marisa could die.
68	"Marcelo culpa a Miky del accidente de Marisa"	13 June 2018	2.9
Marisa does not respond to medical treatment and continues in severe condition. Marcelo believes that Miky is responsible for Marisa's accident. Lesly is expelled from school for cheating on a job.
69	"Marisa despierta del coma"	14 June 2018	2.7
Nicole enters Marisa's room, when she is in front of her, she remembers what Miky advised her and while she was telling her about the lack of her, Marisa wakes up from the coma. Lesly and Bruno run away from home.
70	"Marcelo amenaza con matar a Miky"	15 June 2018	2.7
Miky is determined to fight for Marisa, but Marcelo threatens to kill him if he approaches her again. Miky enters to see Marisa and Marcelo asks Jeny to help him separate them.
71	"Jeny y Marcelo planean su venganza"	18 June 2018	2.5
Jeny does not want Miky to be happy with Marisa and accepts Marcelo's proposal to take revenge on them. Eva trusts Amaranta's friendship, but she betrays her when confronted with Marcelo.
72	"Eva se enfrenta a Marcelo"	19 June 2018	2.6
Miky asks Marisa to be his girlfriend. Eva threatens Marcelo with revealing his past if he does not give her the money that belongs to her. Marcelo is not willing to lose Marisa and decides to take Nicole away.
73	"Miky encuentra a Jeny y Marcelo juntos"	20 June 2018	2.8
Eva and Amaranta suspect that Marcelo's illness is one more of his lies to manipulate Marisa. Miky investigates what Jeny has to do with Marcelo, decides to look for her and finds them together.
74	"Jeny está arrepentida de hacerle daño a Miky"	21 June 2018	2.8
Marcelo confirms that Amaranta was always in complicity with Eva. Jeny does not agree to continue harming Miky, but Marcelo tries to convince her to resume her revenge.
75	"Marcelo amenaza a Marisa con quitarle a Nicole"	22 June 2018	2.7
Marcelo accuses Miky of mistreating Nicole, Marisa asks him to withdraw the complaint but he is willing to do everything to separate them and threatens to take his daughter. Lesly ends with Bruno.
76	"Jeny sospecha que Marcelo no está enfermo"	25 June 2018	2.8
Amaranta starts directing Marcelo's company, her first decision is to fire Marisa and Lorenza. Jeny discovers that Marcelo does not look like a patient who has little time left to live.
77	"Eva planea un encuentro con Marisa"	26 June 2018	2.7
Eva wants to get to know Marisa better and she shows up at her house, tricks her and convinces her to help her find a house. Amaranta accuses Marisa of being a thief and she responds with a slap.
78	"Miky demuestra que Marcelo no está enfermo"	27 June 2018	2.7
Miky confronts Marcelo to demand that he accept that he invented his illness to manipulate Marisa. Marcelo tells Nicole that he is not going to die anymore and Marisa reproaches him for making his daughter suffer.
79	"Marcelo peleará la custodia de Nicole"	28 June 2018	2.6
Marcelo is willing to prove that Marisa is a danger to his daughter and warns her that he will fight the absolute custody of Nicole. Simona discovers that she is expecting a son of Tino.
80	"Marisa decide alejarse de Miky"	29 June 2018	2.2
For the good of Nicole and to avoid more problems with Marcelo, Marisa decides to separate from Miky despite the great love she feels for him. Nicole recognizes Eva and puts her in evidence before Marisa.
81	"Marisa se enfrenta con Marcelo por la custodia de Nicole"	2 July 2018	2.4
Marisa agrees to go to court to win custody of Nicole, warns Marcelo that she is tired of his blackmail and will prove that he is a danger to her daughter.
82	"Marcelo pone a Nicole en contra de Marisa"	3 July 2018	2.8
Marcelo manipulates Nicole by telling her that her mom does not love her because of Miky and manages to convince her to live together. Jeny does not want to continue with Marcelo's plan, but he threatens her to comply.
83	"Marcelo corre a Amaranta de su empresa"	4 July 2018	2.7
Jeny's statement manages to hurt Marisa in the custody trial of Nicole. Marcelo listens to a discussion between Amaranta and Eva, thanks to this he confirms that together they planned to take revenge on him.
84	"Nicole debe elegir con quién quiere vivir"	5 July 2018	2.5
Olga confesses that Amaranta was the one who committed the frauds to blame Marisa and Lorenza. Nicole is called to testify at the trial and must choose who she wants to live with.
85	"Marisa está a punto de perder la custodia de Nicole"	6 July 2018	3.2
Nicole prefers to live with her mother, despite that, Marcelo could win the trial thanks to his lies. Marisa is not willing to leave Nicole and decides to go live with Marcelo.
86	"Marcelo secuestra a Nicole"	8 July 2018	3.4
87	"Marisa y Miky forman un nuevo hogar"	8 July 2018	3.4
Jeny presents new evidence that shows that Marcelo manipulated the information and Eva warns that he is a danger to Nicole, with which Marisa wins the trial. Marcelo decides to take Nicole. On their fourth attempt, Marbella and Ezequiel are finally husband and wife. Miky can not wait to propose to Marisa and start a new family with Nicole.

== Awards and nominations ==
Year	Award	Category	Nominated	Result
2019	TVyNovelas Awards	Best Antagonist Actress	Grettell Valdez	Nominated
