= National Board of Review Awards 1996 =

Annual US film awards ceremony

68th National Board of Review Awards

Best Picture:
Shine

The 68th National Board of Review Awards, honoring the best in filmmaking in 1996, were announced on 9 December 1996 and given on 9 February 1997.

== Top 10 films ==
1. Shine
2. The English Patient
3. Fargo
4. Secrets & Lies
5. Everyone Says I Love You
6. Evita
7. Sling Blade
8. Trainspotting
9. Breaking the Waves
10. Jerry Maguire

== Top Foreign Films ==
1. Ridicule
2. Les Voleurs
3. Bitter Sugar
4. La Cérémonie
5. Kolya

== Winners ==
- Best Picture:
  - Shine
- Best Foreign Language Film
  - Ridicule, France
- Best Actor:
  - Tom Cruise - Jerry Maguire
- Best Actress:
  - Frances McDormand - Fargo
- Best Supporting Actor:
  - Edward Norton - Everyone Says I Love You
- Best Supporting Actress (tie):
  - Juliette Binoche and Kristin Scott Thomas - The English Patient
- Best Ensemble Acting:
  - The First Wives Club
- Breakthrough performance:
  - Renée Zellweger - Jerry Maguire
- Best Director:
  - Joel Coen - Fargo
- Best Documentary:
  - Paradise Lost: The Child Murders at Robin Hood Hills
- Best Film Made for Cable TV:
  - Wild Bill: Hollywood Maverick
- Special Achievement in Filmmaking:
  - Billy Bob Thornton - Sling Blade
- Special Citation:
  - Elia Kazan, for lifetime achievement in direction
- Freedom of Expression Award:
  - The People vs. Larry Flynt - Miloš Forman, Oliver Stone
- International Freedom Award:
  - Zhang Yuan
- Billy Wilder Award:
  - Sidney Lumet
- Career Achievement Award:
  - Gena Rowlands
- William K. Everson Award for Film History:
  - Peter Bogdanovich, for Who the Devil Made It?
- Special Recognition for Excellence in Filmmaking:
  - Angels & Insects
  - Basquiat
  - Big Night
  - Bound
  - Caught
  - Follow Me Home
  - I Shot Andy Warhol
  - Lone Star
  - Marvin's Room
  - The Substance of Fire
  - Swingers
  - The Deli
  - The War Room
  - Unhook the Stars
  - Welcome to the Dollhouse
