= Eduardo Antonio =

Cuban singer (born 1969)

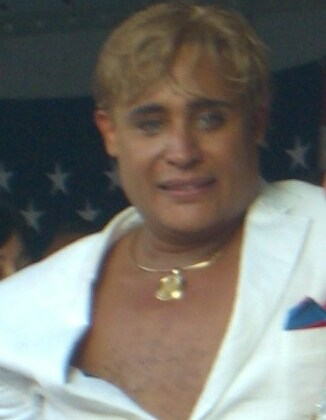
- Born: Eduardo Antonio Jiménez López; December 10, 1969 (age 56); Placetas, Cuba
- Other name: El Divo
- Occupations: Singer; actor
- Years active: 1976–present
- Children: 1

Eduardo Antonio (born December 10, 1969) is a Cuban singer, actor and producer. His songs have served as a soundtrack, presentation and closing theme for soap operas and films such as Preciosa, Alma rebelde, Yo amo a Juan Querendón, Pecadora, Antes que anochezca, among others, acting in some of these.

He was co-presenter of Don Francisco Presenta, where he was nicknamed "El Divo" by Don Francisco. He has also been a special guest on the television programs Cala, Otro Rollo, Cristina, Mujer, Casos de la Vida Real, Sábado Gigante, among others.

== Artistic career ==
He began as a child in his homeland and earned a space within the Cuban pop scene. His first public appearances were made as a child and later, still very young, at the Tropicana cabaret. In 1996, he participated in the Cuban national selection for the OTI Festival, winning with song "Me queda la canción", and representing Cuba in the OTI Festival 1996 held in Quito.

He participated in Mexico in some Televisa telenovelas at the end of the 1990s. He portrayed a nightclub singer in the film Before Night Fall, which recounts the life of Reinaldo Arenas.

His recording debut would come with his album Déjame gritar (English: Let Me Scream), released in 2000. Some songs were part of film soundtracks. He starred alongside Celia Cruz in the video "La Negra Tiene Tumbao."

=== El Divo de Placetas ===
Since 2002, Eduardo Antonio has been the presenter of the program Don Francisco Presenta on Univision, and the Chilean presenter expressed the following: "... I know two divos: one from Juárez, in Mexico, who is Juan Gabriel, and one in Spain, who is from Linares, and is called Raphael... but Cuba already has its divo, he is from Placetas and his name is Eduardo Antonio".

Desde mi alma (English: From My Soul), was published in 2007 under the labels Univisión and Fonovisa. In this record project were the songs belonging to the soundtrack of the telenovela Yo amo a Juan Querendón and the teleserie Mujer, Casos de la Vida Real.

In 2010, he would venture into Christmas music with his single titled "Profecías de navidad" (English: Christmas Prophecy). In addition, he would collaborate with his partner at the time, Niurka Marcos, on the song "Como nos dé la gana" (English: As We Want).

In 2013, he would be interviewed by Ismael Cala for CNN, where he promoted his single "Chiki Bombo" from the album ¡Y México me hizo me rey! (English: And Mexico Made Me King). This song would reach position 21 on the Billboard Tropical Airplay chart.

"Me Juego La Vida" (English: I Play My Life) was Eduardo's project launched in 2015. "Dónde Está El Pecado" (English: Where Is The Sin) was the single that had a video clip, where Eduardo dressed up as a woman. In addition, the song was the promotional song for the online series Cabaret where Eduardo Antonio acted as the transvestite Veneno, along with Alicia Machado, Lis Vega and Lily Rentería.

In 2016, he was part of the tribute to José José at the Miami International Song Festival at the Manuel Artime Theater.

In 2017, he released "Perlas En Mi Voz" (English: Pearls In My Voice), a material with which he returns to the hits of great Latin music performers such as "Por Qué Te Tengo Que Olvidar", "En La Cárcel De Tu Piel" and "Brindaremos".

He was honored along with other celebrities in the final farewell of Sábado Gigante: ¡Hasta Siempre! from the Univision network.

On May 19, 2018, Eduardo Antonio was one of three media figures inducted into Union City's Celia Cruz Park Walk of Fame, along with actor Lucio Fernandez, and Latin Grammy winner Amaury Gutierrez.

In 2019, he premiered the reggaeton song "Yo quisiera", in collaboration with the LKM group. He was one of the artists invited to the New Year's Eve concert in Bayfront Park, organized by the Cuban-American singer Pitbull. This same year together with the Cubans Jeikel Acosta and Abel Bosmenier, one of the vocalists of the former group SBS, he presented the collaborative musical theme "La cuenta no da". The video clip features the participation of the Cuban showgirl Haniset Rodríguez and the Cuban comedian Boncó Quiñongo.

The following year, he released the song "Quédate En Casa" (English: Stay at Home) a composition with a lot of feeling and love in the midst of the COVID-19 pandemic. Guajiro de Placetas 2020, a compilation of Cuban music hits, also arrived. "Si te pudiera mentir" (English: If I could lie to you) with La Diosa, it was his last single this year.

By the year 2022, he collaborated for the Farandula Records' single "Más Reggaeton", along with various urban exponents such as Sandy el White, Henry Méndez, El Cata, Ariel de Cuba, Fedro and Eri White. In 2022, he received the Mundo Mágico AC award in Mexico, and returned to participate in the New Year's Eve concert at Bayfront Park. He was present at the launch of Myriam Hernández's Sinergia album. He also got together with Lenier for his song "Mentiras" (English: Lies), in the video clip that Imaray Ulloa starred in. He closed 2022 by sharing a preview of his collaboration with Señorita Dayana on social networks.

Beginning in 2023, he honored Farah María with the song "Tiburón".

== Personal life ==
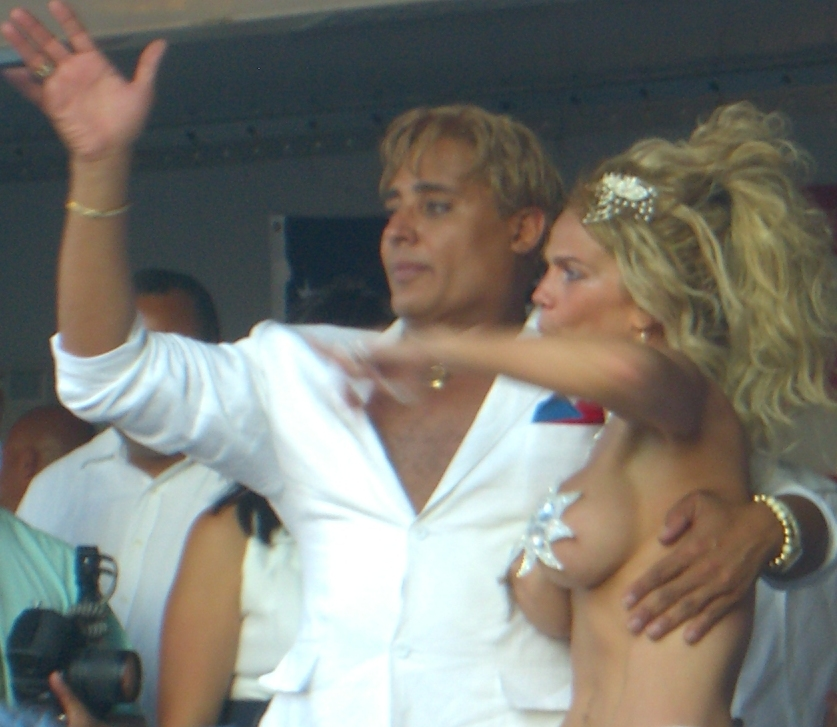
Eduardo Antonio and Niurka Marcos onstage at the annual North Hudson Cuban Day Parade in New Jersey on June 6, 2010

He has a son with the same name, Eduardo Antonio Jiménez Barrera. He considers Juan Gabriel his artist to follow, paying tributes on his albums to some popular songs by "el Divo de Juárez".

Eduardo always generating comments based on his sexual orientation. He had a relationship with Niurka Marcos, it is even speculated that there was a wedding, in a relationship that would culminate in 2011.

In 2018, he began a relationship with the Cuban Arahis Retureta. After the breakup, he started a new relationship. 7 months after having proposed to a Colombian woman named Patricia, in June 2020 he resumed the sentimental relationship that he had had with Arahis.

At the end of 2020, he would openly declare himself homosexual, and would make his relationship with Roy García, a Cuban businessman, official, assuming a nuptial commitment in 2021.

They would get married on Valentine's Day 2023. Niurka Marcos would congratulate him through a video.

== Discography ==
=== Studio albums ===
- 2000: Déjame Gritar
- 2007: Desde mi alma
- 2010: Profecías de navidad
- 2012: Andando Caminos (Éxitos)
- 2013: ¡Y México me hizo un rey!
- 2015: Me juego la vida
- 2015: Chiquibombo (Remixes) EP
- 2017: Perlas en mi voz
- 2020: Guajiro de Placetas 2020

=== Songs for telenovelas ===
- Preciosa (1998) – "Preciosa"
- Mi pequeña traviesa (1998) – "Mi pequeña traviesa"
- Carita de ángel (2000) – "Carita de ángel (Ending song)" (composed by Eduardo Antonio, interpreted by Libertad Lamarque, Lisette Morelos, Miguel de León & Daniela Aedo)
- Pecadora (2001) – "Ódiame pero no me dejes"
- Yo amo a Juan Querendón (2007) – "Palomita Revoloteando", "Cuando llora el corazón", "Tú eres una mentira" and "Baila Cachibombo"

=== Songs for movies ===
- Condones.com (2009) – "Te voy a amar"

=== Songs for TV shows ===
- Mujer, Casos de la Vida Real (2007) – "Mujer"

== Filmography ==
Year	Title	Role
1998	Preciosa	Father Juan Martín
1998	Mi pequeña traviesa	El Caribeño (Caribbean)
1999	Alma rebelde	El Huesos (Bones)
2000	Carita de ángel	Benito the driver
2000	Antes que anochezca	Night club singer
2001	Pecadora	Himself
2001–2002	Salomé	
2002	¡Vivan los niños!	José Bueno
2002–2012	Don Francisco presenta	Co presenter
2003	La negra tiene tumbao	Chorus / Actor
2003	Velo de novia	Dr. Eduardo Bárcenas
2004	Rebelde	Samy / Dancer
2007	Yo amo a Juan Querendón	Molondrón
2007	Al diablo con los guapos	Silvestre
2007	Amor sin maquillaje	Singer
2016	Fátima	
2017	Mariposa de barrio	Jaime Terriquez
2022	Mírame así	
2024	Los 50	Contestant

== Awards and honours ==
- 1996: OTI Cuba Festival – WINNER
- 2017: Delivery of the keys to the city of Miami
- 2017: King of the Cuban parade in New Jersey
- 2018: Included in the Celia Cruz Park Walk of Fame
- 2020: Delivery of the keys to the city of Puerto Vallarta
- 2021: Recognition of his career as an Illustrious Guest in Puerto Vallarta by the City Hall of that city and the local LGBT association.
- 2022: Footprints on Mexico's Walk of Fame
- 2022: Golden microphone awarded by the National Association of Broadcasters of Mexico
