= Rene Lavan =

Cuban-American actor

- Born: November 5, 1968 (age 57); Artemisa, Havana Province, Cuba

Rene Lavan (born November 5, 1968) is a Cuban-American actor.

== Early life ==
Lavan was born in Artemisa, Havana Province, Cuba. In 1980, at the age of 11, he was part of the Mariel boatlift.

== Career ==
In 1996, he appeared as Gustavo in the independent film Azúcar amarga directed by Leon Ichaso. He has also appeared on the long-running ABC soap opera, One Life to Live as Javier Pérez (1995–96, 1997). He has also acted in the telenovela genre appearing in Morelia (1995), and in the Venevision produced Enamorada (1999). In 2001, he appeared as the male lead in Televisa's María Belén.

He has appeared in several publications such as People en Español, Vanidades and Harper's Bazaar. In the last few years, Lavan's television appearances have been on the popular CBS drama, CSI: Miami (2003), on NBC's, Las Vegas (2004), and in the film Dirty Dancing: Havana Nights (2004). He also appeared in Christmas with the Kranks (2004) alongside Tim Allen and Jamie Lee Curtis. He has also co-hosted programs such as the "Latin Billboard Music Awards", "the Latin Grammy's", among others.

He also debuted on Broadway with the long running Latinologues along with Rick Najera and Mexican actor Eugenio Derbez. He is a producer working on various independent projects including music videos and Latin culture-themed films. Additionally, he was formerly named to the board of directors for Fuego Entertainment, a Miami-based Latin-entertainment company that is public under OTC:BB FUGO.

He is in Guerrilla alongside Benicio del Toro coming in 2008 and is also filming an independent movie about Dr. Ricardo Saca, called Flights of Fancy also starring María Conchita Alonso. He also starred in Every Witch Way as Francisco Alonso.

== Filmography ==
=== Film ===
Year	Title	Role	Notes
1993	Miami Shakedown	Dan Lorenzi	
1994	Tollbooth	Julio	
1996	Azúcar Amarga	Gustavo	
2002	Red Bear	Turco	
2003	El Nominado	Kune	
2004	Dirty Dancing: Havana Nights	Carlos Suarez	
2004	Christmas with the Kranks	Enrique Decardenal	
2008	Che: Part One	Cuban Diplomat #2	
2008	In Plain View	Roberto Turilli	
2020	The Last Rafter	Thomas	
2026	The Magnificent Mendez	Rey Leon	

=== Television ===
Year	Title	Role	Notes
1995	One Life to Live	Javier Perez	Episode #1.6860
1995	Oye	Rene	Television film
1995	Morelia	Rene	4 episodes
1996	Un Dia en Hollywood	Rene	Television film
1999–2000	Enamorada	Raimundo Alvarado	100 episodes
2001	The Suitor	Mundin	Television film
2001	María Belén	Pablo Díaz Cortázar	94 episodes
2003	CSI: Miami	Miguel	Episode: "Hurricane Anthony"
2004	Las Vegas	Brazilian Highroller	Episode: "The Family Jewels"
2012	The Glades	City Beach Worker	Episode: "Endless Summer"
2012	Burn Notice	Alejandro Lopez	Episode: "Game Change"
2014	Graceland	Immigration Officer	Episode: "Magic Number"
2014–2015	Every Witch Way	Francisco Alonso	58 episodes
2018	Hialeah	Raul Sanchez	6 episodes
2019	El final del paraíso	Osman Mesa	2 episodes
