= Azúcar Amarga =

- Region 1 DVD cover
- Directed by: Leon Ichaso
- Written by: Leon Ichaso
- Produced by: Leon Ichaso; Julio Carillo; Purita Carillo; Claudio Chea; Pelayo García; Mari Rodriguez Ichaso; Jaime Pina; Lisa Rhoden
- Starring: Rene Lavan; Mayte Vilán; Miguel Gutiérrez; Larry Villanueva; Orestes Matacena
- Release date: 11 October 1996
- Running time: 102 minutes
- Countries: United States, Dominican Republic
- Language: Spanish

Azúcar Amarga (Bitter Sugar) is a 1996 American-Dominican co-production directed by Cuban filmmaker Leon Ichaso. The film was shot in black-and-white. Filmed in Santo Domingo, and starring a cast of Cuban-American émigrés, it also uses archival footage from Cuba.

== Plot ==
Gustavo, a patriotic Cuban communist, catches the eye of an attractive girl, Yolanda, at a rock concert where his brother Bobby is performing. Before he can approach her, the concert is broken up by police. Later Gustavo sees Yolanda in public, and befriends her. Gustavo tells his father Tomás, a psychiatrist widower, about his affections for Yolanda.

Yolanda and Gustavo disagree over Gustavo's communist views; they agree not to talk about politics. Gustavo is granted a scholarship to study at the University in Prague. Bobby complains to Gustavo that the police will not return his band’s equipment, preaching to him about the lack of freedom in Cuba. In protest, Bobby and his band are disruptive in public, leading to their arrest. Gustavo and Yolanda enjoy each other's company on the beach, though they are refused service at a bar that is for tourists only. A rich Italian businessman, Claudio, buys them two beers out of sympathy.

Tomás informs Gustavo that he is reluctantly accepting a job as a pianist at a tourist bar, as it pays considerably more than his job as a professional psychiatrist. Tomás is somewhat dismayed at the irony. Bobby is interrogated in prison, where he is beaten for his insubordination. Gustavo and Tomás bail him out. Yolanda is upset that Gustavo is leaving for Prague. She tells Gustavo that she dreams of living in Miami.

Bobby and his band deliberately infect themselves with HIV, stating if they have to choose between "socialism or death", a popular slogan in Cuban propaganda, they choose death. Gustavo and Tomás are horrified. Gustavo and Yolanda go to a cheap hotel so they can have sex. Gustavo is too depressed, however. Instead he starts talking about his problems. Yolanda leaves. Gustavo looks for Yolanda at her home, but she is not there. He later sees her getting into a car with Claudio.

Gustavo confronts Yolanda, who says Claudio bought her just dinner, and that nothing happened. Police come to arrest Bobby, on the grounds that he has AIDS. Gustavo and Tomás visit Bobby in the detainment camp for people infected with AIDS. Bobby apologises for how his choice affected his family.

Gustavo, who eats leftovers in the kitchen where Tomás works as a pianist, sees Yolanda having dinner with Claudio through the kitchen window. Gustavo aggressively confronts Claudio, and is subsequently thrown out of the restaurant. The kitchen staff tell Gustavo that they see Yolanda there often, whoring herself out to tourists. Later Yolanda is seen crying in Claudio's apartment. Claudio is sympathetic, but cannot convince her to stay with him that night. Tomás is fired from his job. Gustavo's teacher tells him that due to his attacking Claudio his scholarship has been cancelled. Gustavo states he believes there never actually was a scholarship in the first place. His teacher admits there was no scholarship, but he had to pretend there was in order to keep his job.

Gustavo confronts Yolanda, who tells him Claudio has asked her to marry him, implying that she will accept for the financial security he can offer her. She asks Gustavo to forgive her. They spend the night together for the last time.

After being encouraged by Bobby to do so, Gustavo proposes to Yolanda. She accepts, but states she is leaving for Miami tomorrow, asking Gustavo to come with her. Gustavo refuses, stating things are so bad in Cuba because everybody leaves instead of fixing the problem. Yolanda and her parents board a rickety boat headed for Miami. Gustavo attends a speech made by Fidel Castro. A man in front of him has a pistol tucked into the back of his pants. Gustavo takes it, and runs towards where Castro is standing, aiming the gun at him. Gustavo is shot dead by a guard.

Text on screen informs the viewer that Yolanda and her family were intercepted by the United States Coast Guard, but were allowed to settle in America in August 1995. They currently live in Union City, New Jersey. Gustavo was declared a traitor to Cuba, and the location of his remains are unknown. The film ends with old home-video footage showing Yolanda and Gustavo enjoying each other's company on the beach.

== Cast ==
- Rene Lavan (Gustavo)
- Mayte Vilán (Yolanda)
- Miguel Gutiérrez (Dr. Tomás Valdez)
- Larry Villanueva (Bobby)
- Luis Celeiro (Mr. García)
- Teresa Maria Rojas (Belkis)
- Orestes Matacena (Claudio)
- Caridad Ravelo (Soraya)
- Jorge Pupo (Yiyo)
- Victor Checo (Yolanda's Father)

== Reception ==
The film earned $450,060 at the box office in the United States.

Majorie Baumgarden from The Austin Chronicle gave the film 3 out of 5 stars, stating the film had "engaging liveability", though its anti-Castro agenda "enfeeble[d] its naturalistic flavour". Kevin Thomas from the Los Angeles Times stated "No movie could be more anti-Castro", concluding "there's no question that some viewers will find Bitter Sugar one-sided, but it certainly succeeds on its own angry, up-front terms."

It was nominated for "Best Foreign Language Film" at the 1996 Golden Satellite Awards. The National Board of Review of Motion Pictures listed the film as No. 3 in their top five foreign films of 1996.

Baumgarden called the film an "amalgam of true stories about life in modern-day Cuba"; the scene where Bobby and his band deliberately inject themselves with HIV in protest of the government is based on actual occurrences.

Conservative magazine editor and sometime movie reviewer John Podhoretz called the movie "the most anti-Communist work ever made."
