= Dacia Arcaráz =

Mexican actress (born 1967)

Dacia Arcaraz
- Born: Dacia del Pilar Arcaraz González; 8 March 1967 (age 58); Mexico City, Mexico
- Occupation: Actress
- Years active: 1976, 1980, 1987p–resent
- Parent(s): Luis Arcaraz (deceased); Dacia González
- Relatives: Luis Arcaraz (brother)

Dacia Arcaraz (born Dacia del Pilar Arcaraz González, 8 March 1967 in Mexico City, Mexico) is a Mexican actress.

== Filmography ==
Telenovelas, Series, Films
Year	Title	Role	Notes
1976	El niño y la estrella		Film
1980	El Noa Noa		Film
1987-88	¡Ah qué Kiko!	Nena	TV series
1990	Ruleta mortal	Romina	Film
1990	Comando de federales	Griega	Film
1990	Triste juventud		Film
1990	Secta satánica: El enviado del Sr.		Film
1991	Pánico		Film
1991	La Pícara Soñadora	Susana	Supporting role
1991	Cadenas de amargura	Monja	Supporting role
1991-92	Vida robada	Leonor Carvajal	Supporting role
1992	Dos fuerzas		Film
1992	Horas violentas	Clarisa	Film
1993	Entre la vida y la muerte	Arlette	Supporting role
1994-95	Caminos cruzados	Marilú	Supporting role
1994-03	Mujer, casos de la vida real		2 episodes
1995	Los ángeles de la muerte		Film
1995	Sin retorno		Film
1995	Condena para un inocente		Film
1995-96	Pobre niña rica	Norma	Supporting role
1996	Cañaveral de Pasiones	Rosario "Chayo" de Osuna	Supporting role
1996	La antorcha encendida	María Antonieta Morelos	Supporting role
1996-97	Mi querida Isabel	Julia	Supporting role
1997	Campeón		Film
1997	Raíces de odio		Film
1997-98	Desencuentro	Lolita	Supporting role
1998	Loco corazón		Film
1999	El niño que vino del mar	Remedios	Supporting role
1999	Derbez en cuando		TV series
2000-01	Abrázame Muy Fuerte	Angie Elia	Supporting role
2001	María Belén	Malena Cataño	Antagonist
2002	Por un puñado de tierra		Film
2002	XHDRbZ		TV series
2003-04	Bajo la misma piel	Érika Godínez	Supporting role
2004	Amarte es mi Pecado	Diana Salazar	Supporting role
2004	La Jaula		1 Episode: " Los Big Tacos"
2005	Como quien pierde una estrella		Film
2007-08	Yo amo a Juan Querendón	Yadira del Pilar Cachón De la Cueva	Comic Antagonist
2008-09	Mañana es para siempre	Margarita Campillo	Supporting role
2009	Mi pecado	Irene Valenzuela	Supporting role
2011-12	Una familia con suerte	Ofelia Ávalos	Special appearance
2012	Un refugio para el amor	Flor	Supporting role
2013-14	Por siempre mi amor	Ágatha	Supporting role
