= Mayte Vilán =

Cuban actress

- Born: Mayte Vilán; October 5, 1970 (age 55); Cuba
- Occupation: Actress
- Years active: 1992 - Present

Mayte Vilán (born October 5, 1970) is a Cuban-born actress, who has starred in both English-language and Spanish-language television and film. She played Yolanda in the 1996 film Azúcar Amarga, and starred in Colombia the television series Sofía dame tiempo and Mesa para tres, she also starred the 2007 series Pecados Ajenos. Mayte went to Hialeah High School in Florida.
