= Ámbar (TV series) =

- Genre: Telenovela
- Created by: Daniella Castagno
- Written by: Daniella Castagno; Paula Parra; Alejandro Bruna; Felipe Rojas; Raúl Gutiérrez
- Directed by: Felipe Arratia; Enrique Bravo
- Starring: Giulia Inostroza; Sigrid Alegría; Gonzalo Valenzuela; Álvaro Morales
- Theme music composer: "Nena" by Márama
- Country of origin: Chile
- Original language: Spanish
- No. of seasons: 1
- No. of episodes: 158

Production
- Executive producer: Patricio López
- Producer: Verónica Brañes
- Camera setup: Multi-camera
- Production company: Mega

Original release
- Network: Mega
- Release: August 22, 2016 – April 10, 2017

Related
- Tenías que ser tú

Ámbar is a Chilean telenovela created by Daniella Castagno, that premiered on Mega on August 22, 2016, and ended on April 10, 2017. It stars Giulia Inostroza, Sigrid Alegría, Gonzalo Valenzuela and Álvaro Morales.

== Plot ==
Matilde is an apprehensive single mother who loves her daughter Ámbar above all else. With little time at her disposal, Matilde finds the dilemma of not being able to take and bring Ámbar from school. Therefore, she will have to trust the local school driver, Dany, a fun, simple, caring guy who cares for children with love and sometimes acts like a child. What begins as an appreciation on the part of Ámbar towards Dany will become admiration. She will see him as the ideal father she never had. Meanwhile, Matilde discovers that her new boss is Cristóbal Moller, the man who left her more than eight years ago without knowing she was pregnant. Although Cristóbal seeks to seduce her again, Matilde will be in search of something else. Dany has not only captivated Ámbar, Matilde also feels something nice for him.

== Cast ==
- Giulia Inostroza as Ámbar Moller
- Gonzalo Valenzuela as Daniel "Dany" Marambio
- Sigrid Alegría as Matilde Errázuriz
- Álvaro Morales as Cristóbal Moller
- María José Bello as Carla Pino
- Coca Guazzini as María Inés "Nené" Riquelme
- Katyna Huberman as Ximena Segura
- Fernando Larraín as Gastón Fernández
- Solange Lackington as Mireya Zúñiga
- Claudio Arredondo as Rogelio Pino
- Tatiana Molina as Rosa Maldonado / Maribel Palacios
- Ignacio Achurra as Manuel Pino
- Magdalena Müller as Ana "Anita" Pino
- Li Fridman as Ignacia Bilbao
- Renato Jofré as Alex Santibáñez
- Giordano Rossi as Mateo Fernández Segura
- Manuela Opazo as Francisca Silva
- Emilia Echavarría as Javiera Fernández Segura
- Nicolás Risnik as Cristián Bilbao
- Joaquín Méndez as "Jota / Jote"
- Yamila Reyna as Eulalia "Luli" Suazo
- Patricia Velasco as Marta Santibáñez
- Catalina Olcay as Macarena
- Christian Zuñiga as Patricio Morales
- Carmen Zabala as Josefina Ponce

== Ratings ==
Season	Episodes	First aired		Last aired		Average
Season	Episodes	Date	Rating	Date	Rating	Average
1	158	August 22, 2016	28.8	April 10, 2017	21	16.7
