= Enamorada (1999 TV series) =

- Genre: Telenovela
- Created by: Mariela Romero
- Directed by: José A. Ferrara
- Starring: Gaby Espino; Rene Lavan; Carlos Mata; Lilibeth Morillo
- Opening theme: "Enamorada" by Carlos Mata
- Countries of origin: Venezuela; United States
- Original language: Spanish
- No. of episodes: 100

Production
- Executive producer: Igor Manrique
- Production locations: Miami, Florida, United States
- Cinematography: Eduardo Dávila
- Production company: Venevisión

Original release
- Network: Venevisión
- Release: 1999 – 2000

Related
- La revancha (2000 TV series)

Enamorada is a 1999 telenovela co-produced by Venevisión International and Fonovideo. It is a remake of the 1988 telenovela Alba Marina.

Gaby Espino and Rene Lavan starred in the series.

== Plot ==
Eighteen years ago, Augusto's wife, Rosario, abandoned him and ran off with her lover, leaving their two-year-old daughter behind. Fortunately, Ivana was found by a couple who raised her as their own. Years later, Ivana grew up into a beautiful young woman who was charming but naive. Every day, Ivana went to the beach to spy on Raimundo, a handsome young man who jogged there. One day, they accidentally met each other, and in an attempt to impress him, Ivana went overboard by exaggerating about her education and her family's wealth. Ivana continued to fantasize about her future wedding to Raimundo, but her lies eventually caught up with her when she discovered that Raimundo was engaged to Patty, her biological father's stepdaughter. Furthermore, Raimundo was the son of Esther, the woman who actually abandoned Ivana at a stranger's home years ago. Before Rosario left with her lover, she entrusted young Ivana to Esther, who was unwilling to care for the baby. While on a trip abroad, Rosario was involved in an accident that left her in a wheelchair, with no memory of her daughter or the husband she abandoned. Augusto, Ivana's real father, married Sonia, a wealthy widow who had become jealous, straining their relationship. However, Augusto found an opportunity for love again when he met Cristina.

== Cast ==
- Gaby Espino.....Ivana Robles
- Rene Lavan.....Raimundo Alvarado
- Lilibeth Morillo....Cristina Guillén
- Carlos Mata....Augusto Contreras
- Karina....Rosita Robles
- Adolfo Cubas....Rafael Orozco. Villain, later turns good
- Lili Rentería....Sonia Ascanio. Villain, paid a man to kill Rosario, suffers from cancer, repents before she dies
- Carlos Cuervo....Tony Robles
- Marita Capote....Rosario Morales
- Juan Alfonso Baptista....Ricky Contreras
- Flavia Gleske....Patty Parker. Villain, who loves Raimundo, hates Ivana, tried to kill her. Arrested by the police. Ends up insane asylum
- Carol Barba....Jenny Rogers
- Joel Núñez.....Eduardo Good, turns villain, but repents in the end
- Lady Noriega.....Laura Guzman
- German Barrios.....Bartolo Robles
- Lucy Orta.....Esther Alvarado. Villain, ends up jail, in the end turns good
- Jose Luis Franco.....Roberto Santander
- Flor de Loto.....Herminia Ascanio. Villain. Killed Leopoldo and Rosita. Arrested by the police, ends up jail.
- Norma Zuñiga....Sor Angelines
- Claudia Reyes....Sor Serena
- Tessy Castilla.....Rosemary Villegas
- Orlando Casin....Padre Rodrigo
- Carolina Perdigon......Delia
- Cristina Ovin.....Virginia
- Pedro Rentería....Leopoldo
- Juan David Ferrer....Aristides. Villain. Ends up jail.
- María Camila.....Maribel. Villain
- Henry Galue.....Victor Guillen
- Virggi Lopez...... Raquel
- Luis Alberto Garcia.... Rubén
