= Mujer, Casos de la Vida Real =

Mexican telenovela

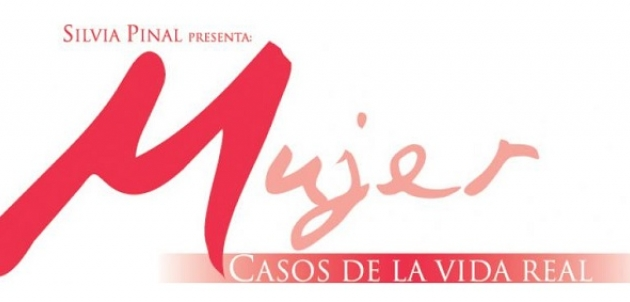
- Created by: Jorge Lozano Soriano; Librettos: Carmen Daniels and Rosa Salazar Arenas
- Presented by: Silvia Pinal
- Theme music composer: "Mujer" by Eduardo Antonio
- Country of origin: Mexico
- Original language: Spanish
- No. of episodes: 1521

Production
- Running time: 60 minutes

Original release
- Network: Canal de las Estrellas
- Release: February 7, 1986 – November 30, 2007

Mujer, Casos de la Vida Real (translated: Woman, Real Life Cases) is an anthology Drama telenovela produced by Mexican television network Televisa for Canal de las Estrellas. Developed as a response to the Mexican earthquake of 1985, the program initially consisted of reenactments of real-life situations, or "cases", related to the earthquake's impact, with the intent of generating assistance for victims. Due to its popularity, Televisa eventually expanded the topics of the stories the series depicted beyond those related to the earthquake. The series was produced and hosted by Mexican actress and politician Silvia Pinal.

In its first few seasons, the show presented generally lighthearted themes, such as love stories and lost loves; during the 1980s, topics such as domestic violence had still not been acknowledged by Mexican society. In 1996, themes became darker in tone, including cases of rape, incest, child abuse, prostitution, LGBT discrimination and domestic violence. The show became a stage for social reform in Mexico. With these changes, the show was usually first in line to discuss topics that were often kept out of the public eye.

Although Mujer, Casos de la Vida Real underwent several metamorphoses in the 2000s, and a spin-off show developed, the show stopped producing episodes in 2007, and in 2009, Pinal confirmed its cancellation.

== History ==
Mujer, Casos de la Vida Real was initially developed as a response to the Mexican earthquake of 1985, with its aim being to prompt assistance for victims of the earthquake by circulating "real-life cases" of its impact. The show received an outpouring of support from Mexican viewers, causing Televisa, the network that produced the show, to expand its scope beyond earthquake-related stories.

The original format of the show usually consisted of two cases per episode, though some one-hour special cases were presented from time to time. It was hosted by actress and politician Silvia Pinal, who at the beginning of each episode would introduce the case the audience was about to view. Afterward, she would return with comments regarding the moral of the story, as well as present her own personal view on what should be done to prevent such events from happening, or, in some cases, what should be done to allow them to happen. In other programs, a guest expert offered advice or interpretation.

By the mid-1990s, the show aired on Saturday nights on Canal de las Estrellas. In 2001, a weekday afternoon version was started, originally keeping the same style of cases as the Saturday version.

The weekday format changed in May 2006 to a mini-series format. Instead of individual cases, various situations were presented in a continuous mini-series that ran throughout the weekdays (Monday – Friday) for one hour each day. This new format brought an end to the usually gritty and, at times, racy material and instead made way for more representation of the love stories and lost loves that characterized the show in its infancy (This was also partially due to being aired in a more family-oriented timeslot).

Reaction to this new format was mixed. Some fans argued that it was not possible to understand the cases without watching every single episode, a problem for many viewers. Other fans argued that the mini-series format allowed for a more accurate representation of cases as opposed to the bare minimum used by the thirty-minute individual cases.

=== Casos de la Vida Real: Edición Especial ===
In the last half of the 1990s and until 2003, Televisa also offered another separate program, a spin-off of the Mujer, Casos de la Vida Real franchise. This spin-off, entitled Casos de la Vida Real: Edición Especial ("Special Edition"), offered once-a-month cases which were said to have been more urgent to the production, although not much difference was seen between the "special edition" branch and the original program by the public itself. This special editions presented cases in the same format as the original program, but utilized a different opening and contained more graphic and explicit material than the original. It was also televised later in the evening. Mexican audiences saw the special edition once a month and American audiences saw the special edition at 9pm on Friday evenings until 2007.

=== Cancellation, airing in the United States, and preservation status ===
The show stopped airing on its traditional Saturday night slot in late 2006, the weekday miniseries version continued until November 2007, when it was replaced by two new serials: Central de Abasto (later cancelled) and La rosa de Guadalupe (still airing).

A 2007 Televisa press release state that Mujer, Casos de la Vida Real would return on Saturday evenings starting in January 2008. At first, it was believed that the show was to be canceled, but Pinal denied this. Since that return did not occur, in March 2009, Pinal confirmed that the program had indeed been canceled and would not be returning to the airwaves. Reruns of the program continued to air on Univisión in the United States. In early 2010, however, the program was suddenly pulled from the air on Univisión as well but the show started airing on TeleFutura since July 2012 . During 2010–2011, reruns from episodes produced between 1998 and 2007, from both the weekday and Saturday versions, aired on weekday afternoons on Gala TV, where it returned in 2017.

In the United States, the show currently airs on Spanish language network UniMás, three episodes air every weekday morning (15 per week), it also airs on Galavision.

Few episodes of Mujer, casos de la vida real have been released on VHS or DVD. Having developed somewhat of a cult following due to its graphic material and handling of taboo subjects, a handful of people have taken up the task of recording and uploading recent reruns of the show to YouTube. However, while very early episodes are available (with the oldest preserved being "El examen", aired in 1986 and starring Lucerito), most episodes uploaded are from the weekday version of the series aired between 2001 and 2006, as it is the version syndicated by Televisa to other networks. As a result, virtually all episodes from 1986 to the late 1990s are deemed lost.

== Similar programs ==
Based on the success of Mujer, casos de la vida real evident with its 22-year run, Televisa's main competitor, Azteca, created a similar program entitled Lo que callamos las mujeres (translated: What We Women Stifle). The material was slightly more professional than the low-budget settings offered by Mujer, and Callamos episodes revolved more around an actual plot rather than simply the case itself. That show started airing in 2000.
