= Miss Dominican Republic 2015 =

- Date: August 30, 2015
- Presenters: Magnolia Kasse; Miralba Ruíz
- Venue: Renaissance Auditorio de Festival del Hotel Jaragua, Santo Domingo, Dominican Republic
- Broadcaster: Colorvisión Canal 9 (Dominican Republic); Telemundo (U.S.)
- Entrants: 30
- Placements: 15
- Debuts: Juan Dolio
- Withdrawals: Mexico; Independencia; Monte Cristi; Monte Plata; Pedernales; Punta Cana; San José de Ocoa; San Juan; Barahona; San José de las Matas
- Returns: Baní; Boca Chica; Sánchez Ramírez; Santo Domingo; Santo Domingo de Guzmán; Villa Altagracia
- Winner: Clarissa Molina; Espaillat

Miss República Dominicana 2015 was the 64th Miss Dominican Republic pageant, held at the Renaissance Auditorio de Festival del Hotel Jaragua in Santo Domingo, Dominican Republic, on August 30, 2015.

Kimberly Castillo of Higüey crowned Clarissa Molina of Espaillat as her successor at the end of the event. Molina represented the Dominican Republic at the Miss Universe 2015 where she reached the top ten.

The first runner-up competed in Reina Hispanoamericana 2015, and the second runner-up competed in Miss United Continent 2016.

== Results ==
=== Placements ===
Placement	Contestant
Miss Dominican Republic 2015	Espaillat – Clarissa Molina
1st Runner-Up	San Francisco de Macorís – Sophinel Báez
2nd Runner-Up	La Altagracia – Jennifer Cruz
Top 10	Santiago – Anna Karina Souffront; Santo Domingo Este – Rosa Nilda Adames; EE.UU. – Massiel Peguero; Juan Dolio – Alexandra Elizabeth Parker; Santo Domingo Oeste – Steisy Morel; Distrito Nacional – Gabriela Franceschini; Boca Chica – Ingrid Franco
Top 15	Santo Domingo de Guzmán – Jennifher Danielle; Hermanas Mirabal – Alejandra Castillo; La Vega – Ana Christina Carlo; Puerto Plata – Gisselle Vásquez; Hato Mayor – Mariorl Calderón

=== National Costume Competition ===
Result	Contestant	Costume
Winner	Santiago – Anna Karina Souffront	Sueño de Cabuya
Finalists	EE.UU.; Distrito Nacional; Espaillat; Hato Mayor; Hermanas Mirabal; La Altagracia; La Vega; San Francisco de Macorís; Santo Domingo Norte	El Ángel guardián de los Dominico-Americanos; Isabela La Católica en Alcázar de Colón; La Monarca Mocana; La Diosa del Ámbar Azul Hatera; La Conquista de la Flor de la Patria; Cacicazgo del Sol Higüeyano; Diablo Cojuelo despierto en el Camú; Cacao es el amor de San Francisco; Los Congos Villamellano

== Contestants ==
Province	Contestant	Age	Height	Hometown
Azua	Ruth Ordalina Franco Merán	20	1.68 m (5 ft 6 in)	Pueblo Viejo
Bahoruco	Ana Mercedes Vargas Encarnación	20	1.79 m (5 ft 10 1/2 in)	Tamayo
Baní	Yatnna Maricela Tejeda Kaussa	18	1.79 m (5 ft 10 1/2 in)	Baní
Boca Chica	Ingrid Mauricia Franco Alvarado	18	1.85 m (6 ft 1 in)	Boca Chica
Com-Dom Estados Unidos	Massiel Elissa Peguero Read	20	1.81 m (5 ft 11 1/2 in)	New York City
Distrito Nacional	Gabriela María Franceschini Faynete	23	1.80 m (5 ft 11 in)	Santo Domingo
Duarte	Alejandra Nancy Cortorreal Rodríguez	20	1.84 m (6 ft 1/2 in)	San Francisco de Macorís
Elías Piña	Ádria Irma Marcel Jiménez	21	1.76 m (5 ft 9 1/2 in)	Comendador
Espaillat	Clarissa María Molina Contreras	23	1.76 m (5 ft 9 1/2 in)	Moca
Hato Mayor	Mariorl Steffany Calderón Rivas	22	1.65 m (5 ft 5 in)	Hato Mayor del Rey
Hermanas Mirabal	Alejandra Carolina Castillo Yermenos	18	1.80 m (5 ft 11 in)	Salcedo
Jarabacoa	Elena María Henao de la Mota	21	1.81 m (5 ft 11 1/2 in)	Jarabacoa
Juan Dolio	Alexandra Elizabeth Parker Lebrón	20	1.83 m (6 ft 0 in)	Guayacanes
La Altagracia	Jennifer Dioyerlina Cruz Pichardo	23	1.82 m (5 ft 11 1/2 in)	Salvaleón de Higüey
La Romana	Idania Marina Sánchez Barbellinni	18	1.79 m (5 ft 10 1/2 in)	La Romana
La Vega	Ana Christina Carlo Ceballos	19	1.80 m (5 ft 11 in)	Concepción de La Vega
Monseñor Nouel	Doris Sophía Fernández Pagiatópoulos	18	1.78 m (5 ft 10 in)	Bonao
Peravia	Somaily Jessenia Castro Ávalo	23	1.71 m (5 ft 7 1/2 in)	Baní
Puerto Plata	Gisselle Rosaura Vásquez Adames	25	1.75 m (5 ft 9 in)	Imbert
Samaná	Shanna Asnal Lamy Santa María	19	1.77 m (5 ft 9 1/2 in)	Santa Bárbara de Samaná
San Cristóbal	Priscila Amelia del Villar Santana	21	1.74 m (5 ft 8 1/2 in)	Villa Altagracia
San Francisco de Macorís	Sophinel Mariel Báez Santos	25	1.83 m (6 ft 0 in)	San Francisco de Macorís
San Pedro de Macorís	Gabriella Leticia Morales Neumann	19	1.79 m (5 ft 10 1/2 in)	San Pedro de Macorís
Santiago	Anna Karina Souffront Ureña	24	1.76 m (5 ft 9 1/2 in)	Santiago de los Caballeros
Santo Domingo de Guzmán	Jennifher Danielle Heredia	23	1.79 m (5 ft 10 1/2 in)	Santo Domingo
Santo Domingo Este	Rosa Nilda Adames Reynoso	21	1.84 m (6 ft 1/2 in)	Santo Domingo
Santo Domingo Norte	Katherine Blanco Taveras	20	1.83 m (6 ft 0 in)	Santo Domingo
Santo Domingo Oeste	Steisy Gynnette Morel Abissadda	23	1.74 m (5 ft 8 1/2 in)	Santo Domingo
Villa Altagracia	Santyeri Rincón Peña-Tejada (La Mas Fea)	25	1.72 m (5 ft 7 1/2 in)	Villa Altagracia
