= Nuestra Belleza Latina 2015 =

- Season 9
- Presented by: Javier Poza; Chiquinquira Delgado
- Judges: Osmel Sousa; Jaqueline Bracamontes; Jomari Goyso
- Winner: Francisca Lachapel
- Runner-up: Nathalia Casco
- No. of episodes: 13

Release
- Original network: Univision
- Original release: January 18 – April 12, 2015

Season chronology
- ← Previous; Nuestra Belleza Latina 2014 Next → Nuestra Belleza Latina 2016

Nuestra Belleza Latina 2015 (NBL 2015) is the ninth season of Nuestra Belleza Latina. The season premiered on January 18, 2015. The season finale was on Sunday April 12, 2015.

The auditions were shown on three Sundays, prior to the selection of the final 12 contestants. Auditions were held September 2014 through November 2014 in six US cities (Miami, Florida; Chicago, Illinois; New York City, New York; Houston, Texas; Los Angeles, and San Juan, Puerto Rico) and virtual online casting. This was the first time since 2013 to show the contestants' castings, and in the previous two seasons only the final 36 and 24 were shown. During the audition process, 35 young women were given passes to the semi-finals in Miami and the remaining 5 were chosen from the online casting. The forty women were asked questions by the judges, then the chosen top twenty contestants did a talent presentation on stage, from which the 12 finalists were selected.

The winner of the contest was awarded a contract to appear on many of Univision's programs and award shows, and a chance to win $200,000 in cash and prizes including a 2015 Kia Soul: the same amount of prizes awarded in previous seasons. She will also be a host for ¡Despierta América!, a correspondent for Premios Juventud 2015, and awarded the title of "Nuestra Belleza Latina" for 2015. The runner-up contestant was awarded a contract to appear as a news correspondent for El Gordo y La Flaca and award shows.

The winner of Nuestra Belleza Latina 2015 is Francisca Lachapel from the Dominican Republic. Marking the first Dominican to win Nuestra Belleza Latina .

== 2015 Judges ==
Judges	Occupation	Judging Years
Osmel Sousa	President of the Miss Venezuela Organization	2007–Present
Jomary Goyso	Fashion Guru, Fashion Expert, TV Host for Sal y Pimenta & Primer Impacto	2015
Jaqueline Bracamontes	Former Nuestra Belleza Mexico 2000 TV Host & Actress	2015–Present

=== Changes ===
For the first time since Nuestra Belleza Latina 2012 the casting process was shown prior to the first gala. Judge of seven seasons former Miss Universe 1991 Lupita Jones will not return to judge the competition, Jones had been judge since Nuestra Belleza Latina 2008. Added to the Judging panel will be former Nuestra Belleza Mexico 2000 and actress Jaqueline Bracamontes.Season 8 Judge Jencarlos Canela left the show to pursue his acting career and other projects and will no longer judge the show. Both new host, former Nuestra Belleza Latina 2007 winner Alejandra Espinoza and model/actor Pedro Moreno have left the show to pursue new projects. New male co-host of Chiquinquira Delgado will be Mexican Host Javier Poza who she shared credits in Mira Quien Baila (2010-2013). Jomari Goyso becomes permanent judge after being only a guest judge and official beauty consultant of the contestants for Nuestra Belleza Latina 2014. Both former Miss Universe winners Alicia Machado and Denise Quiñones who served as "Godmothers" for the contestants in Nuestra Belleza Latina 2014 did not return this season. A new segment called "Rincon Social" has been added with host Roger Gonzalez, who will interview the guest, contestants and present on what social media is saying. Nuestra Belleza Latina 2014 Winner Aleyda Ortiz alongside former Nuestra Belleza Latina 2011 winner Nastassja Bolívar will be the social media co-hostess throughout the competition. For the first time since Season One in 2007 the stage has been renovated, with a different look.

=== 2015 Contestants ===
Final results	Contestant
Winner	Dominican Republic - Francisca Lachapel
Runner-Up	Honduras - Nathalia Casco
3rd Place	Puerto Rico - Catherine Castro
4th Place	Dominican Republic - Clarissa Molina
5th Place	Mexico - Mariana Torres
6th Place	Dominican Republic - Geisha Montes De Oca
7th Place	Mexico - Cynthia Perez
8th Place	Cuba - Lisandra Silva
9th Place	Mexico - Bridget Ruiz
10th Place	Mexico - Gloricely Loug
11th Place	Puerto Rico - Nadyalee Torres
12th Place	Mexico - Anayeli De Santiago
Top 20	Colombia - Janith Arias; Cuba - Yisel Pereira; Dominican Republic - Carolina Peguero; Mexico - Raquel Huerta; Mexico - Julita Palomera; Puerto Rico - Mayra Matos; Puerto Rico - Ashley Perez; Venezuela - Stephanie Mogollon

== Elimination chart ==
Contestants Chart
Top 12	Winner	Runner-Up

Safe	Week's Challenge Winner	First Call-Out	Bottom 4	Bottom 3	Bottom 2	Guest	Bottom 3/ Won the challenge of the week	Bottom 4/ Won the challenge of the week	Eliminated

Stage:			Finalist									Semi-Finals	Finale
Week:			1	2	3	4	5	6		7	8	9	10
Place	Country	Contestant	Result										
1	(Dominican Republic)	Francisca Lachapel	Safe	Safe	Safe	Won	Safe	Won	Safe	Safe	Safe	Safe	Winner
2	(Honduras)	Nathalia Casco	Bottom 2	Safe	Safe	Bottom 2	Safe	Bottom 2	Safe	Bottom 2	Bottom 2	Safe	Runner-Up
3	(Puerto Rico)	Catherine Castro	Bottom 3	Safe	Bottom 3	Safe	Bottom 2	Safe	Safe	Bottom 3	Bottom 3	Won	3rd Place
4	(Dominican Republic)	Clarissa Molina	Won	Bottom 3	Safe	Bottom 3	Won	Safe	Safe	Won	Safe	Won	4th Place
5	(Mexico)	Mariana Torres	Safe	Safe	Safe	Safe	Won	Safe	Safe	Safe	Bottom 2	5th Place	Guest
6	(Dominican Republic)	Geisha Montes De Oca	Won	Bottom 2	Bottom 2	Safe	Safe	Safe	Safe	Bottom 2	6th Place		
7	(Mexico)	Cynthia Pérez	Safe	Safe	Won	Safe	Bottom 3	Bottom 2	7th Place				
8	(Cuba)	Lisandra Silva	Bottom 4	Won	Safe	Safe	Bottom 2	8th Place				Guest	
9	(Mexico)	Bridget Ruíz	Won	Safe	Safe	Bottom 2	9th Place						
10	(Mexico)	Gloricely Loug	Won	Safe	Bottom 2	10th Place							
11	(Puerto Rico)	Nadyalee Torres	Won	Bottom 2	11th Place								
12	(Mexico)	Anayeli De Santiago	Bottom 2	12th Place									

== 2015 auditions ==
Audition	Date
San Juan, Puerto Rico	September 5, 2014
Los Angeles	September 12, 2014
Chicago, Illinois	September 20, 2014
Miami, Florida	September 27, 2014
New York City	October 4, 2014
Houston, Texas	October 11, 2014

== Celebrity guest appearances ==
- Jennifer Lopez, American Singer, Actress, Dancer (Auditions)
- Ricky Martin, Puerto Rican Singer-Songwriter and Actor (1st Gala)
- Zuleyka Rivera, Miss Universe 2006 (1st Gala)
- Julian Gil, Actor & Model (1st Gala)
- Paulina Vega, Miss Universe 2014 (2nd Gala)
- Maluma, Colombian Singer (2nd Gala)
- Yazaira, Singer & Winner of Va Por Ti (2nd Gala)
- El Dasa, Mexican Singer (3rd Gala)
- Maribel De Santiago, NBL 2011 Contestant (3rd Gala)
- Brandon Peniche, Mexican Actor (3rd Gala)
- Marcelo Córdoba, Argentinean Actor (3rd Gala)
- Gilberto Santa Rosa, Puerto-Rican Singer (3rd Gala)
- Chiquis, Singer & TV Personality (4th Gala)
- Aislinn Derbez, Mexican Actress (4th Gala)
- Wisin, Puerto Rican Singer and Rapper (4th Gala)
- Plan B, Music Group (4th Gala)
- Becky G, American-Mexican Singer & Actress (4th Gala)
- Thalía, Singer & Actress (5th Gala)
- Elvis Crespo, Singer (5th Gala)
- Alejandra Espinoza, First Winner of NBL (5th Gala)
- Gente de Zona, Music Group (6th Gala)
- Luis Coronel, Singer (6th Gala)
- Alejandro Chaban, Actor & Fitness Guru (6th Gala)
- Armando Torrea, People en Español Editor (6th Gala)
- Roberto Tapia, Regional Mexican Singer (7th Gala)
- Marco Antonio Solís, Musician & Composer (7th Gala)
- Chino & Nacho, Venezuelan Pop Duo (7th Gala)
- Farruko, Puerto Rican Rapper & Singer (7th Gala)
- Mané de la Parra, Singer & Actor (7th Gala)
- Tony Dandrades, Reporter & Anchor (7th Gala)
- Mauricio Mejia, Actor & Model (7th Gala)
- Salvador Corpas, Actor & Model (7th Gala)
- Yul Bürkle, Venezuelan Actor (7th Gala)
- Borja Voces, Social Media Reporter (7th Gala)
- Melvin Cabrera, Venezuelan Actor (7th Gala)
- Fernando Corona, Runner-Up of Va Por Ti (7th Gala)
- Larry Hernandez, Regional Mexican Singer (8th Gala)
- Noel Schajris, Singer-Songwriter (8th Gala)
- Selenis Leyva, Cuban-American Actress (8th Gala)
- Nicky Jam, Singer-Songwriter (9th Gala)
- Sebastián Ligarde, Actor & Acting Coach (9th Gala)
- Carlos Calderón, TV Personality (9th Gala)
- Jordana Brewster, Furious 7 actress, (9th Gala)
- Christian Daniel, Singer & Model (10th Gala)
- J Balvin, Reggaeton Singer (10th Gala)
- La Arrolladora Banda El Limón, Banda Group (10th Gala)
- Alejandra Guzmán, Mexican Musician and Singer (10th Gala)
- Prince Royce, American-Dominican Singer-Songwriter (Finale)
- Antony Santos, Dominican Singer-Songwriter (Winner)
- Espinoza Paz, Singer-Songwriter (Finale)
- Aleyda Ortiz, NBL 2014 Winner (Finale)
- Alan Tacher, ¡Despierta América! Host (Finale)
- Lourdes Stephen, Sal y Pimienta Host (Finale)
- J Alvarez, Reggaetón Artist (Finale)
- Paulina Rubio, Mexican Singer-Songwriter (Finale)
- Eduardo Verástegui, Singer/Model & Actor (Finale)
- Ricky Martin, Puerto Rican Singer-Songwriter and Actor (Finale)

== Countries being represented ==
CPW	Country	Position											Year Previously Won
CPW	Country	1	2	3	4	5		6	7	8(Finale)			Year Previously Won
check	Dominican Republic	2nd	4th	3rd	2nd	1st	1st	4th	1st	3rd	2nd	1st	2015
—	Honduras	4th	3rd	1st	4th	2nd	3rd	3rd	3rd	2nd	1st	2nd	None
check	Puerto Rico	1st	5th	4th	3rd	4th	2nd	2nd	2nd	1st	3rd		2008, 2012, 2014
check	Mexico	5th	1st	5th	5th	3rd	4th	1st	4th				2007 and 2010
check	Cuba	3rd	2nd	2nd	1st	5th							2009

- Eliminated
- First Place
- Winner
- Runner-Up
- CPW: Countries Previously won
- : Countries Previously won

== Episodes ==
=== Season 9, Episode 1: A New Season Starts ===
Original Air Date—18 January 2015

The best of the auditions held in Chicago, Puerto Rico, and Los Angeles.

The Guest Judges

Judge	Audition Place
Mane de la Parra	Chicago
Daddy Yankee	Puerto Rico
Jackie Guerrido	Los Angeles

The following contestants were chosen:

	Contestant	Age	Country	Audition Place
1	Bridget Ruiz	23	Mexico	Chicago
2	Elsa Chumacero	24	Mexico	Chicago
3	Carolina Peguero	24	Dominican Republic	Chicago
4	Catherine "Caty" Castro Roldán	23	Puerto Rico	Puerto Rico
5	Ashley Perez De Calderón	23	Puerto Rico	Puerto Rico
6	Adamaris Cordero	23	Puerto Rico	Puerto Rico
7	Nadyalee Torres	26	Puerto Rico	Puerto Rico
8	Genesis Concepción	22	Puerto Rico	Puerto Rico
9	Gloricely Loug	19	Mexico	Los Angeles
10	Anayeli De Santiago	19	Mexico	Los Angeles
11	Nataly Pustin	23	Mexico	Los Angeles
12	Jasmin Torres	18	Mexico	Los Angeles

=== Season 9, Episode 2: The Auditions Continue ===
Original Air Date—25 January 2015 The last of Los Angeles and best of the auditions held in Houston, Miami and New York.

The guest judges

Judge	Audition Place
Jackie Guerrido	Los Angeles
Raúl Brindis	Houston
Zuleyka Rivera	Miami
Daniel Arenas	New York City
Verónica Bastos	New York City

The following contestants were chosen:

	Contestant	Age	Country	Audition Place
13	Mabelynn Capeluj	23	Argentina	Los Angeles
14	Karely Navia	21	Mexico	Los Angeles
15	Beberly Saavedra	20	Mexico	Los Angeles
16	Claudia Sanchez	27	Mexico	Los Angeles
17	Carolina Urrea	20	Mexico	Los Angeles
18	Keren Marroquín	18	Guatemala	Los Angeles
19	Raquel Huerta	21	Mexico	Houston
20	Mariana Torres	20	Mexico	Houston
21	Shaereen Natqurr	24	Colombia	Houston
22	Mayra Matos	26	Puerto Rico	Houston
23	Gladys Carredeguas	21	Cuba	Miami
24	Lisandra Silva	27	Cuba	Miami
25	Yisel Pereira	24	Cuba	Miami
26	Julita Palomera	28	Mexico	Miami
27	Nathalia Casco	27	Honduras	Miami
28	Heidy Sánchez	25	Colombia	Miami
29	Geisha Montes De Oca	27	Dominican Republic	Miami
30	Francisca Lachapel	25	Dominican Republic	New York City
31	Clarissa Molina	22	Dominican Republic	New York City
32	Ceylin Rosario	26	Dominican Republic	New York City
33	Taina Pimentel	22	Dominican Republic	New York City
34	Fanny Abreu	22	Dominican Republic	New York City
35	Janith Arias	23	Colombia	New York City

Online Casting

	Contestant	Age	Country	Home Town
36	Andrea Villaroel	23	Venezuela	Miami
37	Estephanie Mogollon	25	Venezuela	New York City
38	Cynthia Perez	26	Mexico	Los Angeles
39	Jenifer Guevara	26	Puerto Rico	Puerto Rico
39	Natalie Rosas	19	Mexico	Houston

=== Season 9, Episode 3: The Top 12 are Chosen ===
Original Air Date—1 February 2015

The 40 contestants chosen in casting, including the 5 chosen from the online casting, competed for the 12 spots into the competition. The 12 contestants selected are announced.

12 Finalists

Contestant	Age	Country	Audition Place
Lisandra Silva	27	Cuba	Miami
Francisca Lachapel	25	Dominican Republic	New York City
Bridget Ruiz	23	Mexico	Chicago
Clarissa Molina	22	Dominican Republic	New York City
Geisha Montes De Oca	27	Dominican Republic	Miami
Nathalia Casco	28	Honduras	Miami
Catherine Castro	23	Puerto Rico	Puerto Rico
Gloricely Loug	19	Mexico	Los Angeles
Anayeli De Santiago	19	Mexico	Los Angeles
Mariana Torres	20	Mexico	Houston
Cynthia Perez	21	Mexico	Online Casting
Nadyalee Torres	26	Puerto Rico	Puerto Rico

=== Season 9, Episode 4: Fifty Shades of Cat Fights and Zombies ===
Original Air Date—8 February 2015

The Top 12 contestants chosen move into the mansion where they face their first challenge, two girls are nominated. They face two challenges which include explosions, zombies, and heroines. Six were asked to perform a photo shoot inspired by the film 50 Shades of Grey. Maluma asked the girls to dance to his new single, 'Carnaval' and Miss Universe 2014, Paulina Vega, advised the girls.

- Automatically Nominated: Lisandra Silva, Catherine Castro and Nathalia Casco
- Nominated by Judges: Anayeli De Santiago
- Saved by Judges: Lisandra Silva
- Saved by Fellow Contestants: Catherine Castro
- Nominees of the Week: Nathalia Casco and Anayeli De Santiago
- First Call-Out (At the Final Runway): Mariana Torres
- Challenge Winners: Lisandra Silva, Gloricely Loug, Clarissa Molina, Geisha Montes De Oca, Nadyalee Torres, Bridget Ruiz
- Guest Appearances: Colombian singer Maluma, singer and Winner of Va Por Ti Yazaira and Miss Universe 2014, Paulina Vega
- Guest Teachers: Mexican Actor, Arturo Peniche (Acting) and Laura Moro, (Diction)

=== Season 9, Episode 5: El Extraño Retorno de Maribel De Santiago ===
Original Air Date—15 February 2015 Maribel de Santiago returns, older sister of nominee Anayeli De Santiago. One contestant is eliminated and two new nominees are chosen. Maribel de Santiago, who auditioned in 2011 in all audition cities and made it to the Top 8, came to support her sister. Anayeli was the first eliminated from the ninth season of Nuestra Belleza Latina getting 48 percent of the vote. Nathalia Casco received 52 percent of the vote and a week left in the competition. The contestants were asked to model couture costumes, accompanied by salsa artist Gilberto Santa Rosa. Mexican singer and composer El Dasa also shared with the contestants chocolates for Valentine's Day. Lisandra, Cuban apologized to teammates for misunderstandings. There was a tie between the contestants to save one, and was left to the judges. Clarissa Molina who represents Dominican Republic was again saved by Osmel. Sentenced this week were Geisha Montes De Oca and Nadyalee Torres.

- Chica People of the Week: Catherine Castro
- Nominees of previous Week: Nathalia Casco and Anayeli De Santiago
- Eliminated from the competition: Anayeli De Santiago
- Nominated by Judges: Anayeli De Santiago, Geisha Montes De Oca, Nadyalee Torres and Clarissa Molina
- Saved by Judges: Clarissa Molina
- Nominees of the Week: Nadyalee Torres and Geisha Montes De Oca
- First Call-Out (At the Final Runway): Catherine Castro
- Challenge Winners: Lisandra Silva and Clarissa Molina
- Guest Appearances: Argentinean Actor, Marcelo Córdoba; Mexican Model and Actor Brandon Peniche; Mexican Singer El Dasa and Puerto Rican singer Gilberto Santa Rosa
- Guest Teachers: Mexican Telenovela Director Hector "El Oso" Marquez (Acting)

=== Season 9, Episode 6: "Cereal" Tension in the Mansion ===
Original Air Date—22 February 2015 One contestant was eliminated as two new ones were nominated: Catherine Castro, and representing Central America, Nathalia Casco. The only one who was in favor of Nathalia was Geisha, who later had to be hospitalised for an infection in his leg. Nadyalee Torres was removed from the night with 43 percent of the vote, while Geisha remained one more week to get 57 percent of the vote. In this gala, the girls saved Catherine. However, sentenced this week were Geisha and Gloricely. This week the contestants had to do a live challenge delivering lines from a teleprompter with exotic animals in their surroundings. Catherine Castro failed the entire challenge. Actress Aislinn Derbez taught the contestants acting skills and challenged them, and the winner of this challenge was Cynthia Perez who will be able to attend the premier of Derbez's new film "A la Mala" in Mexico City. Chiquis Rivera was on stage along with Plan B and Wisin as the musical entertainment for the week. Ending with an encouraging message from Becky G and the girls cat-walking her single "Shower."

- Chica People of the Week: Catherine Castro
- Nominees of previous Week: Nadyalee Torres and Geisha Montes De Oca
- Eliminated from the competition: Nadyalee Torres
- Nominated by Judges: Geisha Montes De Oca, Catherine Castro and Gloricely Loug
- Saved by Fellow Contestants: Catherine Castro
- Nominees of the Week: Geisha Montes De Oca and Gloricely Loug
- First Call-Out (At the Final Runway): Nathalia Casco
- Challenge Winner: Cynthia Perez
- Guest Appearances: Puerto Rican singer Wisin; TV personality/Singer Chiquis and daughter of the late Jenni Rivera; American Singer Becky G
- Guest Teachers: Mexican actress Aislinn Derbez and daughter of comedian Eugenio Derbez (Acting)

=== Season 9, Episode 7: Dirty Little Truths ===
Original Air Date—1 March 2015 The night began with a song from Mexican artist Thalia who was there to launch her new clothing line sold in Macy's. She was also the judge for the challenge of the week, where the contestant must choose a garment from the clothing collection, catwalk and talk about why they chose the garment. Francisca won the challenge and took $10,000 as prize to spend on the department store that carries Thalia's clothing line. Clarissa was saved, and Osmel warned that everyone would be tested for nicotine, with contestants testing positive automatically removed from the competition. With 74 percent against her Gloricely left the competition. Nathalia, Bridget and Clarissa saved Clarissa by unanimous vote, leaving between Nathalia and Bridget the vote to see who stays and who goes next week.

- Chica People of the Week: Nathalia Casco
- Nominees of previous Week: Geisha Montes De Oca and Gloricely Loug
- Eliminated from the competition: Gloricely Loug
- Nominated by Judges: Nathalia Casco, Bridget Ruiz and Clarissa Molina
- Saved by Fellow Contestants: Clarissa Molina
- Nominees of the Week: Nathalia Casco and Bridget Ruiz
- First Call-Out (At the Final Runway): Mariana Torres
- Challenge Winner: Francisca Lachapel
- Guest Appearances: Mexican Singer & ActressThalía, Puerto Rican Singer Elvis Crespo
- Guest Teachers: Mexican Singer & ActressThalía (Presenter/Runway)
- Zip-line Challenge

Rank	Pair	Time
1st Place	Catherine & Nathalia	4min 37sec
2nd Place	Francisca & Mariana	5min 50sec
3rd Place	Geisha & Gloricely	6min 03sec
4th Place	Cynthia & Lisandra	6min 51sec
5th Place	Bridget & Clarissa	7min 26sec

=== Season 9, Episode 8: New Heights ===
Original Air Date—8 March 2015 The results of nicotine testing were negative. Lisandra collapsed when Osmel told her she was a disappointment. Catherine did not do well in the weekly challenge. Bridget Ruiz was the fourth eliminated, while Nathalia stayed one more week with 72 percent of the vote. The three nominees were Cynthia, Lisandra and Catherine but the girls saved Cynthia. Sentenced this week were Catherine and Lisandra. For the upcoming week two contestants will be sent home with one automatic elimination coming from Osmel Sousa.

- Chica People of the Week: Mariana Torres
- Nominees of previous Week: Nathalia Casco and Bridget Ruiz
- Eliminated from the competition: Bridget Ruiz
- Nominated by Judges: Cynthia Perez, Catherine Castro and Lisandra Silva
- Saved by Fellow Contestants: Cynthia Perez
- Nominees of the Week: Catherine Castro and Lisandra Silva
- First Call-Out (At the Final Runway): Geisha Montes De Oca
- Challenge Winner: Clarissa Molina and Mariana Torres
- Guest Appearances:Music Group Gente de Zona, Mexican-American Singer Luis Coronel
- Guest Teachers: Venezuelan Actor/Fitness Guru Alejandro Chaban (Nutrition) and People en Español magazine editor Armando Correa (Beauty Challenge)

=== Season 9, Episode 9: Dancing With the "Beauty" Stars ===
Original Air Date—15 March 2015 A seventh gala where two contestants are eliminated: Lisandra from Cuba and Cynthia from Mexico. Lisandra was knocked out of the competition with 63% of the votes against her. The judges gave their vote of confidence in Nathalia, eliminating Cynthia due to remarks she made and what they called her lack of confidence. The contestants perform dance challenges. Mane de la Parra, Yul Burke, Mauricio Mejia Borja, Melvin Cabrera, Fernando Corona and Tony Andrade accompanied each of the contestnatsx with different choreography. Francisca and Mariana were praised for their performance, and Nathalia, Cynthia and Geisha were criticized for the lack of commitment. Marco Antonio Solis accompanied them as they paraded in couture dresses, Roberto Tapia started the gala and Chino y Nacho judged the swimsuit parade. This week there were no nominees as the finals are in a few weeks.

Part One:

- Chica People of the Week: Nathalia Casco
- Nominees of previous Week: Catherine Castro and Lisandra Silva
- Eliminated from the competition: Lisandra Silva
- First Call-Out (Safe): Mariana Torres
- Challenge Winner: Francisca Lachapel
- Guest Appearances: Mexican-American Singer Roberto Tapia

Part Two:

- Automatically Nominated by Judges: Nathalia Casco and Cynthia Perez
- Eliminated by Judges: Cynthia Perez
- First Call-Out (At the Final Runway): Clarissa Molina
- Guest Appearances: Venezuelan Pop Duo Chino & Nacho, Puerto Rican reggaeton singer-songwriter Farruko, and Mexicano Musician & Composer Marco Antonio Solís
- Guest Dancers: Mexican Singer & Actor Mané de la Parra, Dominican Republic Reporter & Anchor Tony Dandrades, Mexican Actor Mauricio Mejia, Model/Actor Salvador Corpas, Venezuelan Actor Yul Bürkle, Spaniard Social Media Reporter Borja Voces, Venezuelan Actor Melvin Cabrera, Mexican Singer and Runner-Up of "Va Por Ti" Fernando Corona

Dance Partners:

Contestant	Celebrity	Occupation	Dance Style
Mariana Torres	Mané de la Parra	Actor & Singer	Tango
Francisca Lachapel	Tony Dandrades	Reporter & Anchor	Bachata
Catherine Castro	Borja Voces	Social Media Reporter	Flamenco Pop
Lisadra Silva	Melvin Cabrera	Venezuelan Actor	Salsa
Clarissa Molina	Mauricio Mejia	Mexican Actor	Merengue
Geisha Montes De Oca	Salvador Corpas	Actor & Model	Reggaeton Pop
Nathalia Casco	Yul Bürkle	Actor & Model	Disco
Cynthia Perez	Fernando Corona	"Va Por Ti" Runner-Up	Regional Mexicano

=== Season 9, Episode 10: Drama is the New Black ===
Original Air Date—22 March 2015 Larry Hernandez accompanied the candidates to a beauty pageant, along with former "Sin Banderas" Noel. Lissandra talked to the contestants after their expulsion last week. This Sunday the candidates were subjected to two different tests: one answers of general interest accompanied with "Bellecitas" girls contest "Despierta America". The other task was to try to get out of a "prison" where they encountered scares in their paths. Each girl received a box full of memories sent by their families. Mariana received the news that her grandfather was not in good health, and Clarissa talked about her parents' separation. When the judges choose the three candidates to be removed, they named Catherine, Geisha and Natalia, who saved Catherine prior to the semi-finals.

- Chica People of the Week: Nathalia Casco
- Nominated by Judges: Catherine Castro, Geisha Montes De Oca and Nathalia Casco
- Saved by Fellow Contestants:Catherine Castro
- Nominees of the Week: Geisha Montes De Oca and Nathalia Casco
- First Call-Out (At the Final Runway): Mariana Torres
- Challenge Winner: Clarissa Molina
- Guest Appearances: Reginal Mexicano Singer Larry Hernandez, Argentinean Singer-Songwriter Noel Schajris, and Cuban-American Orange Is the New Black actress Selenis Leyva, Cuban-American Salsa Singer Joe Rodriguez, ¡Despierta América! Bellecitas Latinas
- Guest Teachers: Physical Trainer & Former Republica Deportiva model Claudia Molina (Fitness)

=== Season 9, Episode 11: Road to the Semi-Finals ===
Original Air Date—29 March 2015

- Chica People of the Week: Nathalia Casco
- Nominees of previous Week: Nathalia Casco and Geisha Montes De Oca
- Eliminated from the competition: Geisha Montes De Oca
- Nominated by Fellow Contestants: Nathalia Casco and Catherine Castro
- Saved by Judges: Catherine Castro
- Nominated by Judges: Mariana Torres
- Nominees of the Week: Nathalia Casco and Mariana Torres
- First Call-Out (At the Final Runway): Clarissa Molina
- Challenge Winner: Catherine Castro
- Guest Appearances: Singer-Songwriter Nicky Jam, TV Host and Personality Carlos Calderon, Actor and Acting Coach Sebastián Ligarde
- Guest Teachers: The Fast and the Furious franchise actress Jordana Brewster (Acting & Stunts); Movie Double Stunt Coordinator Juan Bofill (High Risk Stunts), Siempre Mujer editor Christina Marrero, Maybelline New York beauty expert Delvin González

=== Season 9, Episode 12: The Final Chopping Block ===
Original Air Date—4 April 2015

- Chica People of the Week: Nathalia Casco
- Nominees of previous Week: Nathalia Casco and Mariana Torres
- Eliminated from the Competition: Mariana Torres
- Brought Back: Lisandra Silva (April Fool's Guest)
- 2015 Semi-Finalists: Clarissa Molina, Catherine Castro, Francisca Lachapel and Nathalia Casco
- First Call-Out (At the Final Runway): Francisca Lachapel
- Challenge Winner: Clarissa Molina (Colgate) and Catherine Castro (Facebook)
- Guest Appearances: Colombian reggaeton singer J Balvin, Mexican Banda Group La Arrolladora Banda El Limón and Model-Singer Christian Daniel, Mexican Singer-Songwriter Alejandra Guzmán

=== Season 9, Episode 13: Nuestra Belleza Latina 2015 is... ===
Original Air Date—12 April 2015 After 13 weeks of competition, the Dominican Francisca Lachapel became the new winner of Nuestra Belleza Latina, with the majority of votes and approval of judges. A final gala was held, with guest appearances from Paulina Rubio, Ricky Martin, Prince Royce, Antony Santos, Espinoza Paz and J Alvarez. With her character "Mela La Melaza," Lachapel emerged as winner from the auditions, winning $200,000 in prizes, a contract with Univision, a new Kia Soul car, and inclusion in the list of "50 Most Beautiful" by People magazine in Spanish. Honduran Nathalia Casco was awarded first runner-up. Puerto Rican Catherine Castro was second runner-up, and won a scholarship from CEA Televisa in Mexico to study acting. In fourth place was Clarissa Molina.

- Chica People of the Week: Nathalia Casco
- CEA Scholarship Winner: Catherine Castro
- Predecessor: Aleyda Ortiz, Nuestra Belleza Latina 2014
- Guest Appearances: Mexican Model & Actor Eduardo Verástegui, Main Cast of ¡Despierta América! Alan Tacher, Anchor and Moderator for Sal y Pimienta Lourdes Stephen, Singer-Songwriter Prince Royce, Bachata Singer-Songwriter Antony Santos, Musician Singer-Songwriter Espinoza Paz, Pop Singer Paulina Rubio, Puerto Rican Reggaetón artist J Alvarez and La Banda Producer Singer-Songwriter Ricky Martin
- 2015 Finalists: Clarissa Molina, Catherine Castro, Francisca Lachapel and Nathalia Casco
- 4th Place: Clarissa Molina
- 3rd Place: Catherine Castro
- Runner-Up: Nathalia Casco
- Nuestra Belleza Latina 2015: Francisca Lachapel

== 2015 Contestants ==
Final result	Contestant
Winner	Dominican Republic - Francisca Lachapel
2nd Place	Honduras - Nathalia Casco
3rd Place	Puerto Rico - Catherine Castro
4th Place	Dominican Republic - Clarissa Molina
5th Place	Mexico - Mariana Torres
6th Place	Dominican Republic - Geisha Montes De Oca
7th Place	Mexico - Cynthia Perez
8th Place	Cuba - Lisandra Silva
9th Place	Mexico - Bridget Ruiz
10th Place	Mexico - Gloricely Loug
11th Place	Puerto Rico - Nadyalee Torres
12th Place	Mexico - Anayeli De Santiago

== Summaries ==
=== Call-out order ===
Chiqui's Call-Out Order
Order	Episodes												
Order	Top 20	Final 12	1	2	3	4	5		6	7	8(Finale)		Top 2
1	Cynthia	Lissandra	Mariana	Catherine	Nathalia	Mariana	Geisha	Mariana	Mariana	Clarissa	Catherine	Nathalia	Francisca
2	Janith	Francisca	Bridget	Bridget	Lisandra	Lisandra	Clarissa	Francisca	Francisca	Francisca	Nathalia	Francisca	Nathalia
3	Lisandra	Bridget	Nadyalee	Lisandra	Clarissa	Francisca	Francisca	Catherine	Clarissa	Catherine	Francisca	Catherine	
4	Yisel	Clarissa	Cynthia	Nathalia	Cynthia	Catherine	Nathalia	Clarissa	Catherine	Nathalia	Clarissa		
5	Nathalia	Geisha	Clarissa	Cynthia	Francisca	Cynthia	Mariana	Geisha	Nathalia	Mariana			
6	Gloricely	Nathalia	Gloricely	Gloricely	Mariana	Geisha	Cynthia	Nathalia	Geisha				
7	Anayeli	Catherine	Francisca	Francisca	Bridget	Clarissa	Catherine	Cynthia					
8	Bridget	Gloricely	Geisha	Mariana	Catherine	Nathalia	Lisandra						
9	Raquel	Anayeli	Lissandra	Clarissa	Geisha	Bridget							
10	Mariana	Mariana	Catherine	Geisha	Gloricely								
11	Julita	Cynthia	Nathalia	Nadyalee									
12	Mayra	Nadyalee	Anayeli										
13	Catherine	Janith											
14	Ashley	Yisel											
15	Nadyalee	Raquel											
16	Carolina	Julita											
17	Geisha	Mayra											
18	Francisca	Ashley											
19	Clarissa	Carolina											
20	Stephanie	Stephanie											

Color	Description	Used
	The contestant won the competition	Top 2
	The contestant won second place	Top 2
	The contestant was eliminated	Top 20-Finale
	The contestant was eliminated by judges	Week 6
	The contestant won the challenge of the week, and was saved by the judges	Week 1 & 7
	The contestant was chosen from online voting	Top 20 & 12
	The contestant was saved by the viewers vote	Week 1-7
	The contestant was saved by fellow contestants	Week 1 & 3-6
	The contestant won the challenge of the week, and was saved from elimination	Week 2
	The contestant is nominated and awaiting viewers vote	Week 1-7
	The contestant won challenge of the week	Top 12-Finale

== Winners ==
Preceded by Aleyda Ortiz	Nuestra Belleza Latina 2015; Francisca Lachapel	Succeeded by Clarissa Molina
