= Jorge Radhamés Zorrilla Ozuna =

Dominican military and politician (born 1954)

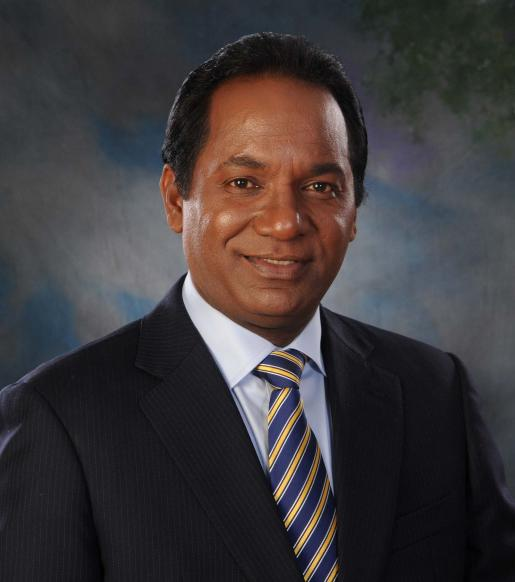
- General Jorge Radhamés Zorrilla Ozuna

Director of National Institute of Price Stabilization (INESPRE)
- In office August 20, 2012 – 2016
- Preceded by: Lic. Ricardo A. Jacobo Cabrera

President of the Civic Renovation Party (PCR)
- Incumbent
- Assumed office September 8, 2009

Chief of Staff of the Dominican Army
- In office 2003–2004
- Preceded by: Carlos Luciano Díaz Morfa
- Succeeded by: José Ricardo Estrella Fernández

Personal details
- Born: December 16, 1954 (age 71) Guayabo Dulce, Hato Mayor, Dominican Republic
- Party: Civic Renovation Party
- Spouse: Rosanna González
- Children: Jorge Manuel; Katherine Johanna; Jorge Radhamés
- Occupation: Politician

Jorge Radhamés Zorrilla Ozuna (Guayabo Dulce, born December 16, 1954) is a Dominican lawyer, politician, and retired General of the Dominican Army. He is the President and founder of the Civic Renovation Party. He was Chief of Staff of the Dominican Army from 2003 to 2004 and is the current Director of the National Institute of Price Stabilization (Spanish: Instituto de Estabilización de Precios).

== Early life and education ==
Jorge Radhamés Zorrilla Ozuna was born in Guayabo Dulce (a town of the province Hato Mayor in the Dominican Republic), on 16 December 1954 to Manuel María Zorrilla and Sirila Ozuna.

He studied Law in the Central University of Professional Studies (Spanish: Universidad Central Dominicana de Estudios Profesionales). He is known as a lecturer on topics pertaining history and society, and for developing projects for the restoration of historic buildings in the country.

== Military career ==
From 2000 to 2003, he served as Commander of the First Dominican Regime of the Presidential Guard, where he excelled at contributing with the educational growth of the country. In 2003, he became Chief of Staff of the Dominican Army.

== Political career ==
He organized the Civic Renovation Movement, which helped support Miguel Vargas Maldonado in the pre-presidential election of Dominican Republic in 2008.

In September 2009 the Civic Renovation Party is recognized as a political party by the resolution no. 18-2009 with which he is presented as a Presidential candidate.

Jorge Radhamés Zorrilla Ozuna participates in the presidential elections of 2012, in the Purple Alliance (Spanish: Alianza Morada), supporting Danilo Medina, who won the presidential election of Dominican Republic in 2012.

In 2012 the Progressive Renovator Pact (Spanish: Pacto Progresista Renovador) was signed between members of the Dominican Liberation Party (including Leonel Fernández Reyna President of the Party and of Dominican Republic in that moment, Danilo Medina, and Reinaldo Pared Pérez) and members of the Civic Renovation Party (its President Jorge Radhamés Zorrilla Ozuna and the General Secretary, Franklin White Coplin). Other signatories were: Francisco Javier García, General Coordinator of the Dominican Liberation Party, Jaime David Fernández Mirabal, Temístocles Montás, Radhamés Camacho, Roberto Salcedo, and senators Félix Bautista from San Juan de la Maguana, Amílcar Romero from Duarte Province, Rubén Darío Cruz from Hato Mayor, Félix Nova from Monseñor Nouel, José Rafael Vargas from Espaillat, and Rafael Calderón from Azua. This alliance later took Danilo Medina to the Presidency of Dominican Republic.

== Sila Ozuna Foundation ==
In 2004, Jorge Radhamés Zorrilla Ozuna founded the Sila Ozuna Foundation to promote the welfare of those in need due to poverty, diseases or social injustices by giving them medical attention, food, and educational donations that will help them have a brighter future.

== National Institute of Price Stabilization ==
In August 2012, through the decree 468-12, the President of Dominican Republic, Danilo Medina, designated Jorge Radhamés Zorrilla Ozuna as the Director of the National Institute of Price Stabilization (Spanish: Instituto Nacional de Estabilización de Precios –INESPRE-). Throughout his administration, he has created programs to support local producers of the country as well as increasing the purchase power of consumers, specifically those of lower income, by providing the country of quality products at affordable prices.

== Inclusion of Military Vote in Dominican Republic ==
On June 1, 2015, Jorge Radhamés Zorrilla Ozuna proposed the inclusion of the military vote in the constitutional reform of Dominican Republic, to be effective on the elections of 2016.

This reform has as core purpose to create the universal suffrage in the country, defend the vote as a fundamental right, strengthen Dominican democracy, and give Dominican military and policemen the right to vote, as every citizen is entitled to, according to the article 21 of the Universal Declaration of Human Rights.

Only 4 countries of the 35 that form the Americas and the Caribbean, including Dominican Republic, Colombia, Honduras, and Guatemala, prohibit military voting rights. For this reason, this proposal will have national transcendence, as it will benefit around 90,000 members of order and security forces in Dominican Republic. As part of this proposal, it is established that the constitutional mandate must prohibit military and policemen to get involved in any political activity, to guarantee that they remain as guarantor of democracy and won't destabilize the democratic process of the Dominican nation.

== Personal life ==
Jorge Radhamés Zorrilla Ozuna married Rosanna González, on March 3, 1984 with whom he has fathered three children: Jorge Manuel, Katherine Johanna y Jorge Radhamés.

== Awards ==
For his professional and military career he has received multiple awards both nationally and internationally, such as:

- Award given in 2013 by Senator and Mayor of Union City, Brian P. Stack, in New Jersey.
- Award given by José (Joy) Torres, Mayor of the City of Paterson
- Award of "Distinguished Visitor" given in 2013, by the Counsel of Councilors of Puerto Plata
