= Hato Mayor =

Hato Mayor may refer to:

- Hato Mayor Province
- Hato Mayor del Rey
