= El Valle, Dominican Republic =

El Valle
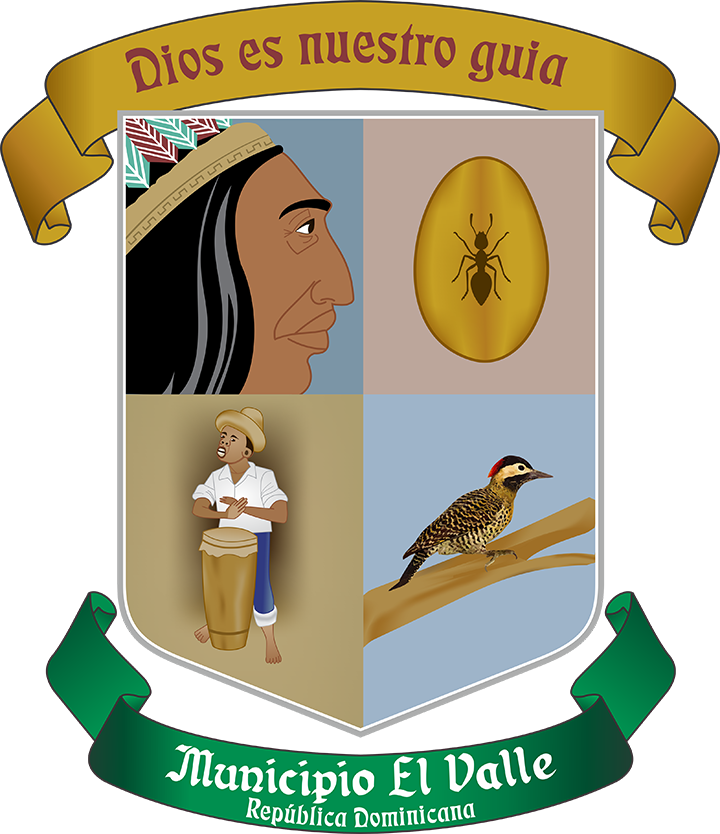
- Coat of arms

- Location within the Dominican Republic
- Coordinates: 18°58′35″N 69°22′45″W
- Country: Dominican Republic
- Province: Hato Mayor
- Municipality since: 1982

Area
  - Total: 161.12 km^{2} (62.21 sq mi)

Population (2012)
  - Total: 8,855
  - Density: 54.96/km^{2} (142.3/sq mi)
  - Demonym: Vallero(a)
- Distance to * Hato Mayor: 33 km (21 mi)
- * Sabana de la Mar: 8 km (5 mi)

El Valle is a town in the Hato Mayor Province of the Dominican Republic. El Valle is 8 kilometres (5 mi) south of the coastal town of Sabana de la Mar.

- Main street name: Maria Trinidad Sanchez.
- River names: El Sano, Jaguera, and Janigua.
- There is a creek that divides the town. The creek is called Porquero (porkero), named after the locally raised swine that bathe in the creek.
