= National Institute of Price Stabilization =

Institute in Dominican Republic

- Instituto Nacional de Estabilización de Precios

Agency overview
- Formed: December 11, 1969
- Jurisdiction: Dominican Government
- Headquarters: Dominican Republic Avenida 27 de Febrero, Plaza de la Bandera, Apartado Postal 86-2, Santo Domingo; 18.450878°N 69.975969°W
- Agency executive: Jorge Radhamés Zorrilla Ozuna
- Parent department: Ministry of Agriculture of Dominican Republic
- Website: www.inespre.gov.do

The National Institute of Price Stabilization (Spanish: Instituto Nacional de Estabilización de Precios) better known for its acronym in Spanish, INESPRE, was created by the law No.526, issued by the Executive Power of the Dominican Republic, on December 11, 1969.

The National Institute of Price Stabilization provides support and services inside the national system of agricultural commercialization. Their objective is to improve the profitability and competitiveness of agricultural producers, and increase the purchase power of local consumers.

Currently, INESPRE is directed by Jorge Radhamés Zorrilla Ozuna, who was designated by President Danilo Medina on August 20, 2012, by the decree No. 468-12, article 2.

== History ==
When INESPRE was created, its main activities include the following:

- Merchandise and acquisition of products directly from local producers, to intervene with the market price of goods and products.
- Stimulate increase in production by increasing the income of producers.
- Administration of social programs for the distribution of agricultural products.
- Regulation of activities that improve the merchandising of agricultural products, and provide information to producers about the prices of the products in both the domestic and international market.

== Objectives ==
General:

- Implement a transparent system of agricultural merchandising that guarantees the market stability of agricultural products.

Specific:

- Reinforce the role of the institution as a coordinator and facilitator of agricultural merchandising, to help solve conflicts between interest groups.
- Increase the offer of agricultural products through its Producers’ Markets (Spanish: Mercados de Productores).
- Increase the number of Producers' Markets to supply the country with quality products at affordable prices.
- Strengthen the market information system to guarantee that producers have clear expectations of price variations in the market.
- Improve the competitiveness of the agricultural sector through the development of a capacitation plan on better agricultural practices.

== Directors ==
Former Directors
Name	Year of entry	Year of exit
Dr. Alfred Wiese Delgado	23-12-1969	30–09–1970
Dr. Rafael Tobías Alba Ball	01-10-1970	01–01–1972
Dr. Luis Heriberto Suárez Astacio	01-01-1972	27–08–1974
Dr. J. Ricardo Ricourt Rodríguez	27-08-1974	28–04–1977
Ing. Reinaldo A. Bisonó Fernández	01-05-1977	01–11–1977
Dr. J. Ricardo Ricourt Rodríguez	01-11-1977	16–08–1978
Lic. Manuel Fernández Mármol	17-08-1978	01–12–1978
Ing. Gustavo Omar Sánchez Díaz	01-12-1978	31–07–1982
Ing. José Altagracia Michellen Stefan	17-08-1982	29–01–1986
Sra. Rosa Haydee Arvela de Messina	29-01-1986	18–03–1986
Lic. Teófilo Quico Tabar	18-03-1986	16–08–1986
Ing. José Ramón Martínez Burgos	19-08-1986	04–03–1987
Ing. César Augusto Espaillat Ureña	04-03-1987	19–03–1987
Lic. Katiusca Rosa Bobea Quiñones	19-03-1987	27–02–1988
Dr. Noé Sterling Vásquez	27-02-1988	19–08–1990
Lic. Francisco Ant. Jorge Elías	20-08-1990	11–10–1990
Lic. Rafael Augusto Collado Abreu	11-10-1990	11–11–1991
Ing. Agr. Manuel Amezquita Candelier	11-11-1991	18–08–1993
Ing. Agr. Jaime Rodríguez Guzmán	18-08-1993	22–08–1994
Lic. Abigail Soto	22-08-1994	25–06–1995
Gral. Leoncio García García	25-06-1995	02–02–1995
Lic. Danny Antonio Morel	02-02-1996	22–08–1996
Ing. Gustavo Sánchez Díaz	22-08-1996	03–06–1998
Lic. Alejandro Jerez Epinal	04-06-1998	16–08–2000
Ing. Agr. Pablo Mercedes	16-08-2000	16–08–2004
Lic. José Francisco Peña Guaba	16-08-2004	20–08–2008
Lic. Ricardo A. Jacobo Cabrera	20-08-2008	17–08–2012
Lic. Jorge Radhamés Zorrilla Ozuna	17-08-2012	Current

== 2012-2016 Administration ==
During the current administration, Jorge Radhamés Zorrilla Ozuna has developed important initiatives to help local producers, consumers, and the institution which has contributed to improve the financial situation of producers, consumers, and suppliers.

The new philosophy of the institution is to “offer support and services in the national agricultural system in order to improve the profitability and competitiveness of local producers as well as the purchase power of consumers, specifically those of lower income”.

The institution's functions are:

- Provide agricultural producers with the necessary storage infrastructure, through loans or leases, so they can face fluctuations in the market behavior.
- Promote the creation of markets in which national agricultural producers can sell their products, benefitting themselves and consumers by diminishing intermediaries.
- Identify and promote new investment opportunities in the agricultural sector.
- Establish capacitation centers for producers to increase their ability to manage agricultural commercialization.
- Reinforce the institution's role as a mediator in the agricultural sector, to help solve conflicts between interest groups.
- Promote the creation of packaging centers in production zones to increase the added value to agricultural production.

=== Accomplishments ===
Under Jorge Radhamés Zorrilla Ozuna's administration, INESPRE has benefitted consumers, guaranteeing fair prices to agricultural products and strengthening local producers' trust by protecting them from sudden price fluctuations in products of massive consumption. Other accomplishments include:

- Bigger diversity of products sold through INESPRE
- Reduction of price speculation by distributing products effectively, using as an element of market stabilization the direct sell to consumers of lower income.
- Creation of more than 1,500 jobs
- Creation of more than 2,072 programs including the “Mercados de Productores”, “Bodegas Fijas”, “Bodegas Móviles”, and “Agromercados”.
- More than 3 million people have been benefitted with the execution of the program PROCOMER
- More than 2,235 local producers have been benefitted
