= Premios Juventud =

Hispanic and Latino American awards show presented by Univision

- Current: 2026 Premios Juventud
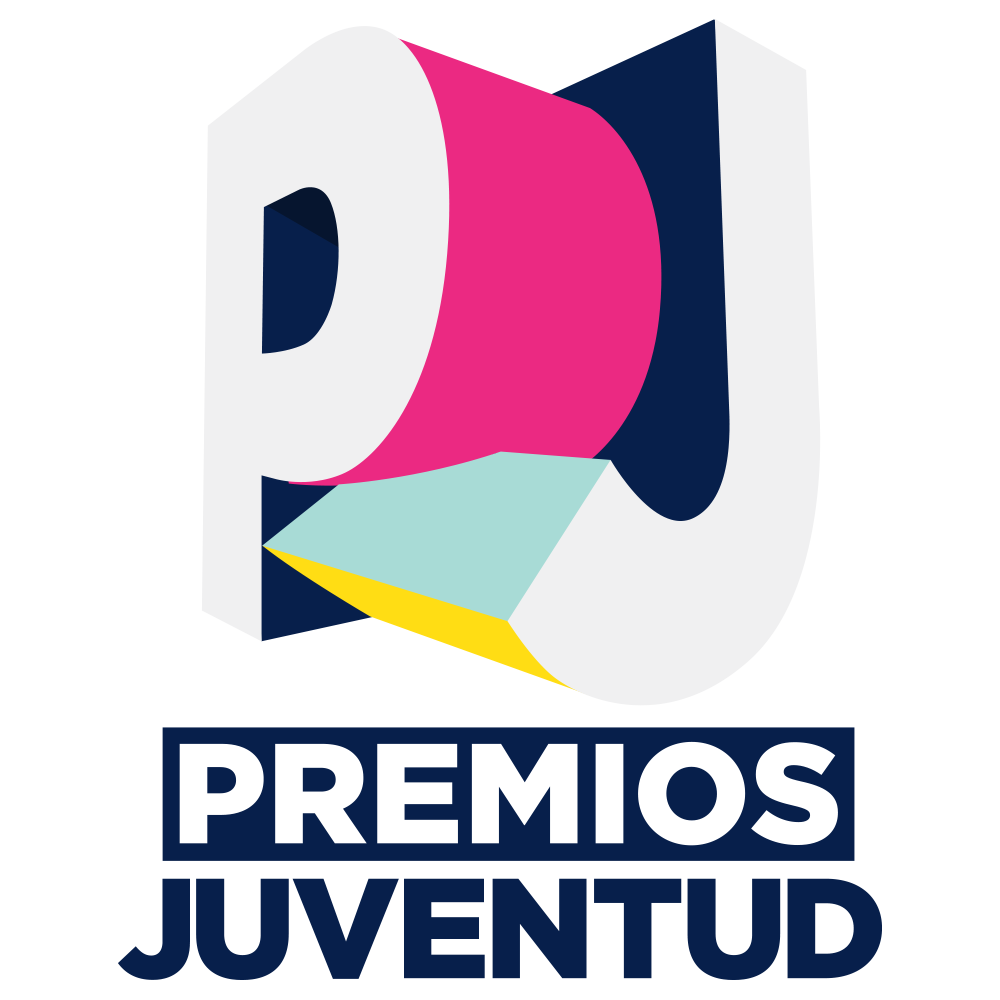
- Awarded for: pop culture of young Hispanic and Latino Americans
- Country: United States
- Presented by: Univision
- First award: 2004
- Website: premiosjuventud.com

Premios Juventud (Youth Awards) is an awards show for Spanish-speaking celebrities in the areas of film, music, sports, fashion, and pop culture, presented by the television network Univision. Winners are determined by online vote at univision.com.

Premios Juventud is set apart by their unique categories, including "Me muero sin ese CD" (Album I can't live without), "Mi concierto favorito" (My favorite concert), and "La más pegajosa" (Catchiest song). Past winners have included people such as Ricky Martin, Shakira, Prince Royce, Juanes, Enrique Iglesias, Daddy Yankee, Thalía, RBD, Romeo Santos, Antonio Banderas, Maná, Jennifer Lopez, Gloria Trevi and Fifth Harmony.

== Editions ==
The first two editions were held in September. In 2006 it was moved up to July. From 2004 to 2017 the show aired on a Thursday. The 2018 edition has been the only edition to be held on a Sunday and to not have nominees and voting. With the 2019 edition, the show moved back to a Thursday and nominees and voting returned.

Edition	Date	Host(s)	Venue
1st	September 23, 2004	Cristián de la Fuente, Galilea Montijo, Myrka Dellanos	Watsco Center
2nd	September 22, 2005	Jaime Camil, Kate del Castillo	Watsco Center
3rd	July 13, 2006	Alessandra Rosaldo, Cristián de la Fuente, Jan, Ninel Conde	Watsco Center
4th	July 19, 2007	Angélica Vale, Belinda Peregrín, Jaime Camil	Watsco Center
5th	July 17, 2008	Eduardo Santamarina, Mayrin Villanueva, RBD	Watsco Center
6th	July 16, 2009	Anahí, Juan Soler, Karyme Lozano, Pee Wee	Watsco Center
7th	July 15, 2010	Ninel Conde, Pee Wee	Watsco Center
8th	July 21, 2011	William Levy	Watsco Center
9th	July 19, 2012	Alicia Machado	Watsco Center
10th	July 18, 2013	Eduardo Yañez, Erika Buenfil	Watsco Center
11th	July 17, 2014	Ana Brenda Contreras, Cristián de la Fuente, Galilea Montijo	Watsco Center
12th	July 16, 2015	Alejandra Espinoza, El Dasa, Ninel Conde, William Levy	Watsco Center
13th	July 14, 2016	Emeraude Toubia, William Levy	Watsco Center
14th	July 6, 2017	Alejandra Espinoza, Danilo Carrera	Watsco Center
15th	July 22, 2018	María Elena Dávila, Manolo Gonzalez	Watsco Center
16th	July 18, 2019	Lali, CNCO, Alejandra Espinoza	Watsco Center
17th	August 13, 2020	Julissa Calderón, Ana Patricia Gámez, Francisca Lachapel, Borja Voces, Sebastián Yatra	Seminole Hard Rock Hotel & Casino Hollywood
18th	July 22, 2021	Alejandra Espinoza, Chiquis y Sebastian Yatra	Watsco Center
19th	July 21, 2022	Danna Paola, Eduin Caz, Clarissa Molina y Prince Royce	José Miguel Agrelot Coliseum
20th	July 20, 2023	Ángela Aguilar, Alejandra Espinoza, Dayanara Torres, and Marcus Ornellas	José Miguel Agrelot Coliseum
21st	July 25, 2024	Lele Pons, Clarissa Molina and Wisin	José Miguel Agrelot Coliseum
22nd	September 25, 2025	Clarissa Molina, Alejandra Espinoza and Nadia Ferreira	Figali Convention Center
23rd	September 3, 2026	Alejandra Espinoza, Clarissa Molina and Jesús Vázquez	Starlite Auditorium

== Records ==
=== Most wins ===
The record for most Premios Juventud won is held by Karol G with 33 awards. The record for most Premios Juventud won by a male artist belongs to Bad Bunny with 23 awards. The record for most wins for a group belongs to RBD, who have collected 20 awards. The records for most wins for a professional sports team belongs to the New York Yankees, with 8 awards.

Rank	Artist	Number of awards (Note: As of the 2025 edition.)
1	Karol G	35
2	Shakira	28
3	Bad Bunny	26
4	Daddy Yankee	25
5	Prince Royce	24
6	RBD	20
7	Luis Fonsi	15
7	Jennifer Lopez	15
8	Wisin & Yandel	14
9	Enrique Iglesias	13
10	Aventura	10
10	Chayanne	10
10	J Balvin	10
10	Peso Pluma	10
11	Maluma	9
11	Pitbull	9
11	Romeo Santos (Note: Romeo Santos has won six awards as a soloist and sixteen combined with Aventura.)	9
12	Anuel AA	8
12	Grupo Firme	8
12	New York Yankees	8
13	Becky G	7
13	Camila	7
13	Maná	7
14	Bizarrap	6
14	CNCO	6
14	Ozuna	6
14	Jenni Rivera	6
14	Rosalía	6
15	Angelique Boyer	5
15	Antonio Banderas	5
15	Farruko	5
15	Gente de Zona	5
15	Natanael Cano	5
15	Sebastián Rulli	5

=== Most wins in a single ceremony ===
The record for the most Premios Juventud won in a single year is held by Luis Fonsi (in 2009), with 10 awards won. RBD (in 2006), Karol G (in 2022) and Shakira (in 2023) follow with 9 awards won in a single year.

- Luis Fonsi: 10 (2009)
- RBD: 9 (2006)
- Karol G: 9 (2022)
- Shakira: 9 (2023)

== See also ==
- Latin American television awards
