= José Francisco Peña Guaba =

Dominican politician

José Francisco Peña Guaba (5 October 1963 –) is a politician and diplomat of the Dominican Republic (DR), who served as general consul of the DR to Panama in the 1980s, as deputy for the Institutional Social Democratic Bloc (1998–2002), and as executive director of the National Institute of Price Stabilization (2004–2007). He is the eldest male son of the late politicians José Francisco Peña Gómez (1937–1998) and Julia Idalia Guaba Martínez (c.1937–2008).
