= Mata Palacio =

- Location within the Dominican Republic
- Coordinates: 18°42′0″N 69°19′12″W
- Country: Dominican Republic
- Province: Hato Mayor

Population (2010)
  - Total: 5,393

Mata Palacio is a town in the Hato Mayor province of the Dominican Republic. The population has been steadily declining for the past twenty years, going from 7,197 to 4,861 from 2002 to 2022, respectively.

== Sources ==
- – World-Gazetteer.com
