= Juan Dolio =

- Juan Dolio in the Dominican Republic
- Coordinates: 18°25′30″N 69°25′27″W
- Country: Dominican Republic
- Province: San Pedro de Macoris

Population (2010)
  - Total: 2,488

Juan Dolio is a seaside community in the province of San Pedro de Macoris on the southern coast of the Dominican Republic on the island of Hispaniola. As of 2010, it had 2,488 inhabitants and belongs to the district municipality Guayacanes.
