= Francisca Lachapel =

Dominican model

Francisca
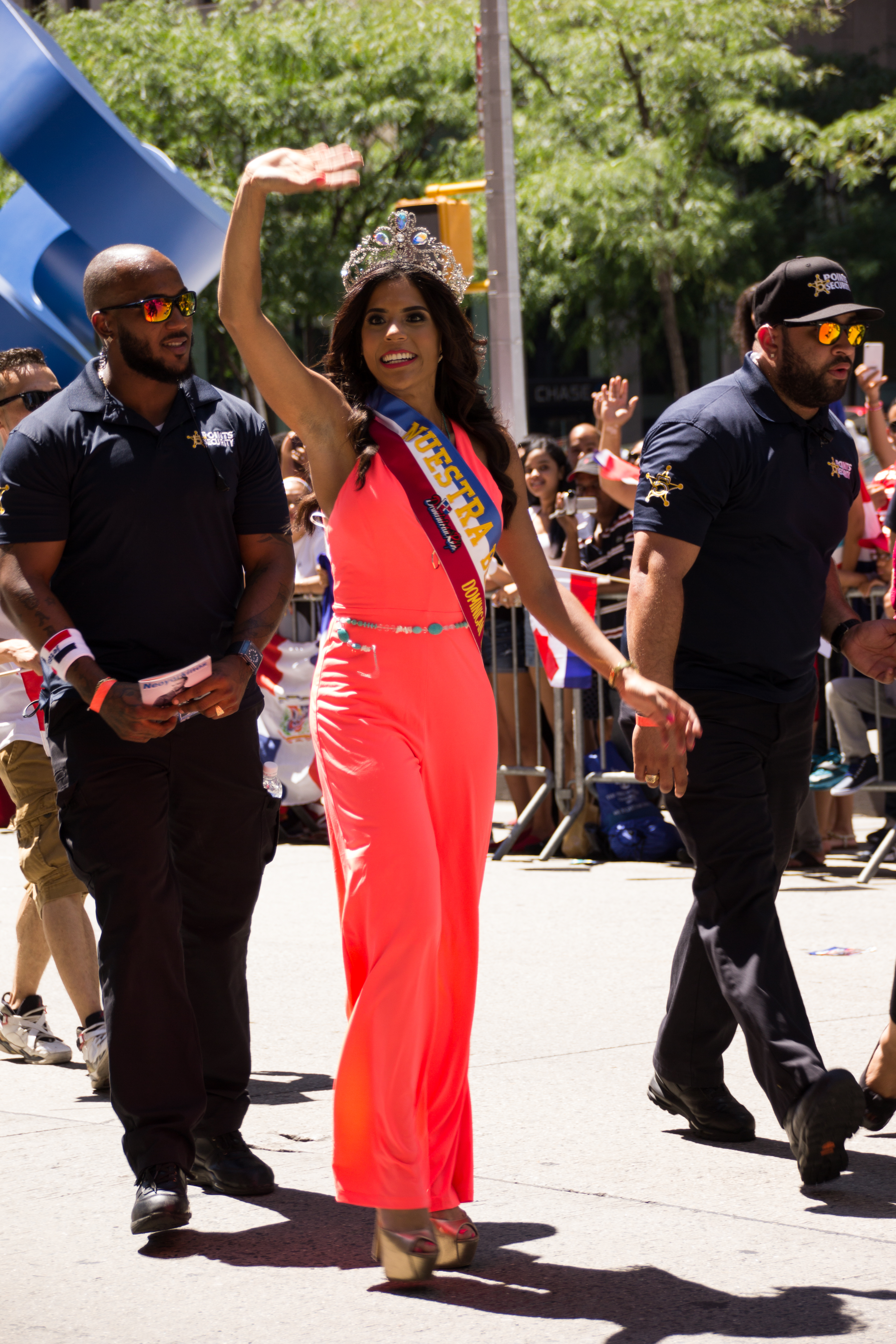
- Francisca at the Dominican Day Parade, August 2015
- Born: Francisca Antonia Méndez Montero; 5 May 1989 (age 37); Azua de Compostela, Dominican Republic
- Occupations: TV host Pageant titleholder
- Height: 1.62 m (5 ft 4 in)
- Spouses: Rocky Lachapel (m. 2010; div. 2016) Francesco Zampogna (m. 2019)
- Children: 3
- Beauty pageant titleholder
- Agency: VivAlto Media
- Hair color: Black
- Eye color: Brown
- Major competitions: Nuestra Belleza Latina 2015 (Winner); Tu Cara Me Suena

Francisca Antonia Zampogna (née Méndez Montero;) born 5 May 1989 in Azua de Compostela is a Dominican actress, TV host, and beauty pageant titleholder, who was crowned Nuestra Belleza Latina 2015 on 12 April 2015. She is currently a co-host on the popular morning show ¡Despierta América! on the Univision Network. She starred in Tu Cara Me Suena after her two mega show/gala was eliminated due to COVID-19 exposure.

== Early life ==
Francisca was born on 5 May 1989. In her adolescence she participated and appeared in the Dominican television. She emigrated to the United States in 2010.

== Nuestra Belleza Latina 2015 ==
Francisca auditioned for Nuestra Belleza Latina in New York City where she advanced to Round 2 and was invited to Miami to further compete in the competition. After 12 weeks of competition, Francisca was crowned Nuestra Belleza Latina 2015, becoming the first Dominican to win the beauty Latino pageant. Francisca, Alejandra Espinoza, and Ana Patricia Gámez are currently the only winners of Nuestra Belleza Latina to never be in the Bottom 2 or 3. She won $200,000 in prizes, a Kia Soul, a one-year contract with Univision network and she was featured in People en Español magazine's 50 most beautiful people of 2015.

== Career ==
As of April 2015, Francisca works as a reporter and co-host for Univision's morning show ¡Despierta América!. Francisca was also the host of the backstage segment called "Rincon Social" of Nuestra Belleza Latina 2016. She has also made appearances on El Gordo y la Flaca, Sabado Gigante, Sabadazo and Sal y Pimienta.

In October 2016, she traveled to Mexico City to film Televisa's telenovela Despertar contigo. In February 2017, she co-hosted the show Dale Replay for Univision alongside Carlos Calderon and Alessandra Villegas. In 2018, she provided commentary for the Eurovision Song Contest 2018 with co-host Vanessa Claudio.

== Personal life ==
Francisca is Afro-Dominican. Francisca was married to Rocky Lachapel from 2010 to 2016. She married Italian businessman Francesco Zampogna in 2022 and lives in Miami, Florida. They have three children.

== Notes ==
Awards and achievements
Preceded by (Puerto Rico) Aleyda Ortiz	Nuestra Belleza Latina; 2015	Succeeded by (Dominican Republic) Clarissa Molina
