= Alexandra Elizabeth Parker =

Dominican beauty queen (born 1994)

- Born: Alexandra Elizabeth Parker; October 7, 1994 (age 32); Higüey, Dominican Republic
- Beauty pageant titleholder
- Title: Miss Earth Dominican Republic 2015
- Major competitions: Miss Earth 2015 (Unplaced); Miss Earth Dominican Republic 2015 (winner)
- Website: Official website

Alexandra Elizabeth Parker is a Dominican beauty pageant title holder, professional artist, actress, and model. She was crowned Miss Earth Dominican Republic 2015 on September 20, 2015.

== Personal life ==
Born October 7, 1994, in Higuey, Dominican Republic she is a dual citizen of the United States and Dominican Republic. She grew up in Santo Domingo, Dominican Republic, Lakeland, Florida, and Sylva, North Carolina. She currently resides in Los Angeles, California.

== Career ==
She began modeling at the age of 15 and has appeared in numerous publications, television shows and movies. She competed in the Miss Earth worldwide pageant in Vienna, Austria, in December 2015. In June 2018 she booked the lead role for a new Playboy TV series called "Seven Motives," playing Eva, the ex wife. The show first aired on June 29, 2018, airing a new episode every Friday.
