= Lourdes Stephen =

Dominican television presenter (born 1976)

- Born: Lourdes Stephen; May 18, 1976 (age 50); Santo Domingo, Dominican Republic
- Occupations: Actress; Television Presenter

Lourdes Stephen (born May 18, 1976) is a Dominican journalist and television host. She was best known for being the anchor and moderator for Sal y Pimienta, a show broadcast by Univision, left in July 2023. For eight years, Stephen served as a national correspondent for the news magazine Primer Impacto on Univision.

Along with Don Francisco, Stephen hosted La Gran Noche de Eva Luna and El Gran Final del Triunfo del Amor. She has frequently hosted the entertainment segment on Sábado Gigante, and has co-hosted Despierta América. She was a presenter for the Latin Grammy Awards in 2010.

As of now, she’s an anchor for Telemundo Al Rojo Vivo (2002 TV Program).

== Early life ==
Lourdes Stephen was born in Santo Domingo, Dominican Republic, where she graduated in public relations from the Universidad Iberoamericana (UNIBE).

Before moving to the United States, Stephen was the anchor for Noticiero TVC and wrote a column for the El Siglo newspaper. Following her move, she earned a Master's degree in journalism from Boston University.

== Career ==
Stephen joined Univision in 2003, and was based in New York City. From there, she had the opportunity to cover events of national importance related to the country’s history and culture, including the anniversaries of the September 11 terrorist attacks, the death of singer Celia Cruz in 2003, and the funeral of President Ronald Reagan in 2004. She also covered news such as the blackout in New York of August 2003, the collision of the Staten Island Ferry in October 2003, and Hurricane Rita in September 2005.

Stephen moved to Miami in 2006, where she covered the FIFA World Cup from Germany and the 2008 Gubernatorial Elections in Puerto Rico, in addition to working on investigative reports on political, social and immigration issues. Throughout her career, Stephen has interviewed politicians and celebrities including former Gov. George Pataki, Donald Trump, Sammy Sosa, Alex Rodríguez, Penélope Cruz and New York Mayor Michael Bloomberg. She also carried out interviews with the President of the Dominican Republic Leonel Fernández and the serial murderer known as The Zodiac Killer.

Stephen was one of the judges for Misión Reportar, a competition show on Galavisión, and served on the judging panel on the Emmy Awards for the News and Documentary category.

== Awards ==
Stephen received the Dennis Kauff Memorial Award in 2001. In 2007, the President of the Dominican Republic, Margarita Cedeño de Fernández, honoured Stephen with a National Youth Award for her work abroad. She was also nominated by the El Especialito newspaper as Best New York Correspondent.
