= Sabana de la Mar =

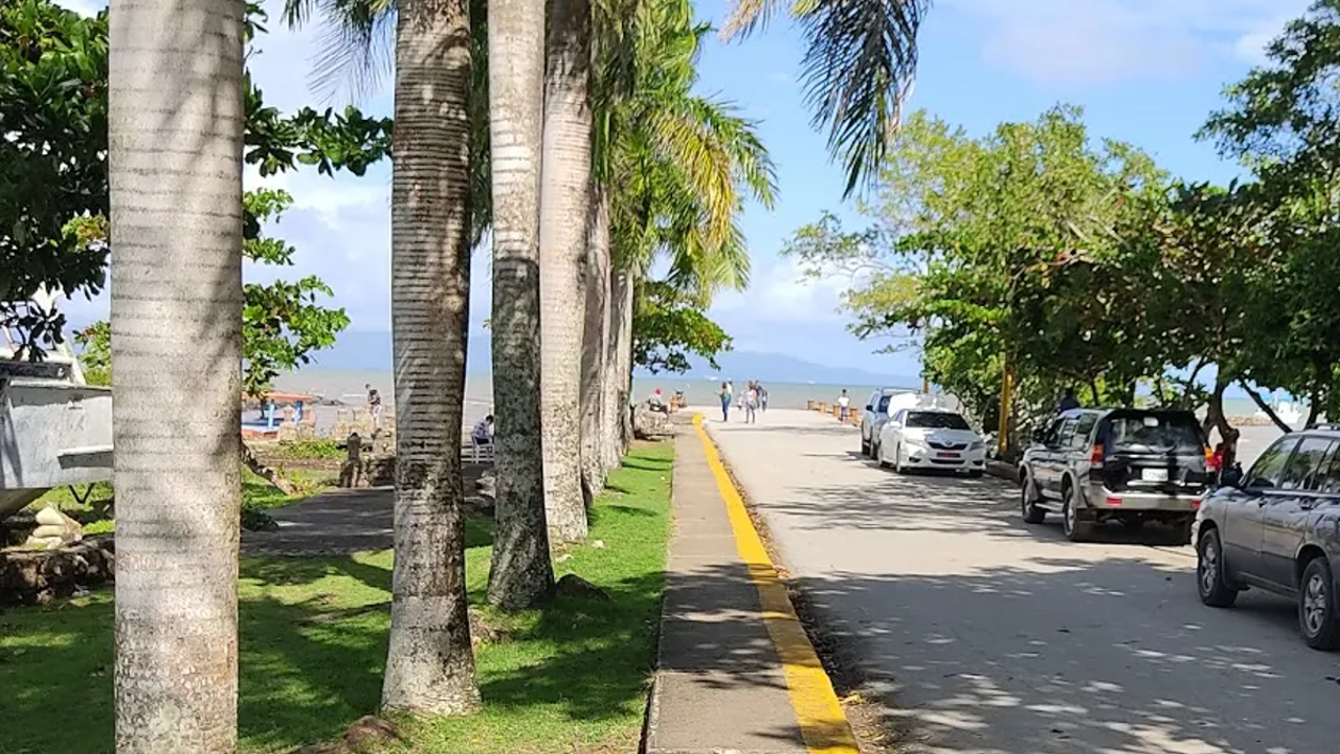
- Sabana de la Mar in Hato Mayor, Dominican Republic.

- Location within the Dominican Republic
- Coordinates: 19°4′12″N 69°23′24″W
- Country: Dominican Republic
- Province: Hato Mayor
- Founded: 1760

Area
  - Total: 508.52 km^{2} (196.34 sq mi)
- Elevation: 3 m (9.8 ft)

Population (2012)
  - Total: 10,582
  - Density: 20.809/km^{2} (53.896/sq mi)
  - Demonym: sabanalamarino (a)
- Distance to – Hato Mayor: 36 km
- Municipalities: 1
- Climate: Af

Sabana de la Mar, usually spelled in English as Savana de la Mar, is a town in the Hato Mayor province of the Dominican Republic. Sabana de la Mar is located in the northeastern region of Dominican Republic, on the southern side of Samaná Bay. It is an urban area with 508.52 km^{2}.

== History ==
In the years 1605 and 1606, the lands surrounding Sabana de la Mar were visited by Spanish colonists in search of land to cultivate and raise cattle. The official foundation of the municipality was in 1756, when a dozen families from the Canary Islands settled in the area, initiated by the Governor Francisco Rubio and Peñaranda during the same time as the settlement of the Peninsula of Santa Bárbara of Samaná. Eventually, other Europeans came to the community. It was named Sabana de la Mar due to the characteristics of the place, a wide and fertile savannah near the seashore. By 1796, Sabana de la Mar was a town of palm and thatch house, whose anchorage was only used for small ships. In the years following the foundation, the hamlet had a hundred houses and a population of 300 inhabitants, who took advantage of the large tracts of land for grazing, although these had greater potential for varied crops.

It was elevated to the category of Common (Municipality) in 1876 belonging to the Maritime District (Province) of Samaná. In 1884 the first town hall began to function and from that date it directed most of the town's activities. From the late 1890s to the 1920s, important transformations took place in Sabana de la Mar with the construction of Lira, Cabrera and El Progreso streets, the construction of the pier, the official naming of the first streets of the town by the city council and the first delimitation of the urban and rural area. During the 1930s the Hato Mayor-Sabana de la Mar highway was inaugurated of constant communication with Santo Domingo and the first power plant to serve the community is installed. From 1949 to 1955 a US military base was installed, which had a weather station. In 1963, the bridge over the Yabón River was built, which allowed permanent transit between Hayo Mayor del Rey and Sabana de la Mar. On December 3, 1984, it was transferred to the Province of Hato Mayor when said province was created.

== Economy ==
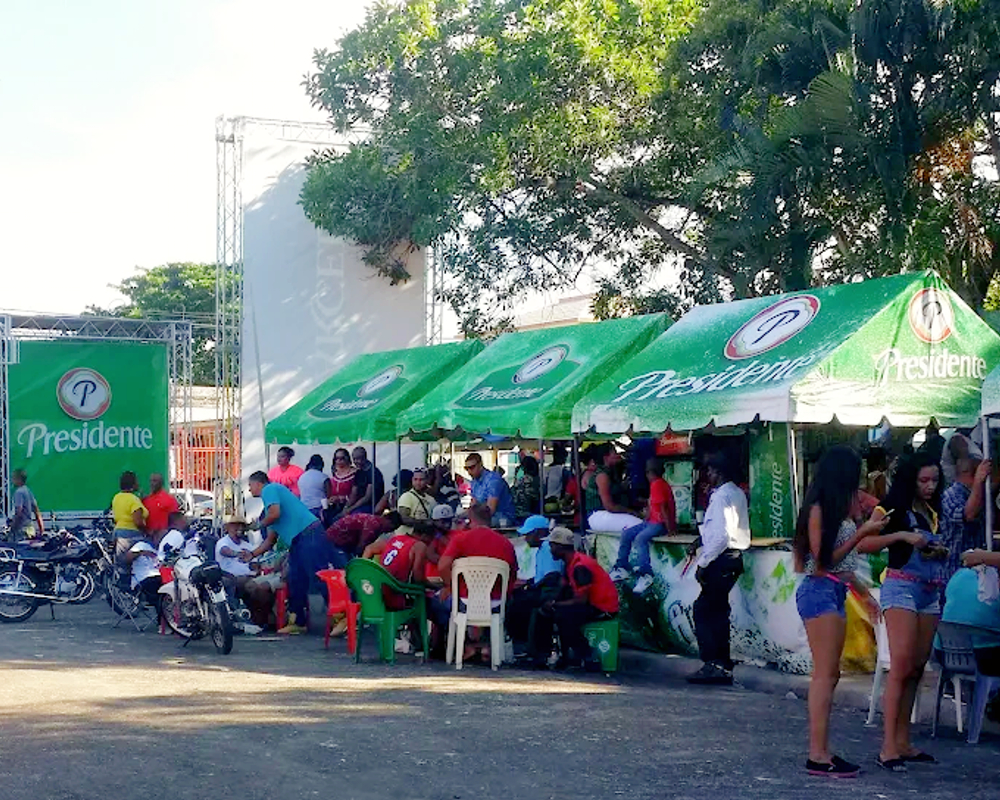
People in Sabana de la Mar, Dominican Republic.

The economy of 10,582 inhabitants is based on agriculture, fishing, and Government jobs. A large portion of the Los Haitises National Park and the San Lorenzo Bay are located in Sabana de la Mar. Environmental issues are a great concern for this community.

Since the 20th Century, Sabana de la Mar has been recognized as the birthplace, on December 1, 1892, of Señorita Elupina Cordero. She became blind at a very early age and developed a mystical and religious personality that attracted thousands of followers. While alive, she was known for curing different types of illnesses with her prayers, touch, and natural remedies using herbs she grew in her garden.

There is the Chapel Señorita Elupina Cordero, where she is buried. It has become a must pilgrimage for hundreds of people from all over. There is also, on the grounds of the Chapel, a free school from Kindergarten to 8th grade. The Chapel is located on Calle Elupina Cordero and Calle 27 de Febrero. The hospital of Sabana de la Mar is also named Hospital Señorita Elupina Cordero to honor, acknowledge and remember her healing powers. Her miracles have been documented regularly, and Señorita Elupina Cordero is in the process for cannonization by the Catholic Church. She died on June 4, 1939. Every year, hundreds of people come to Sabana de la Mar for her Memorial on June 4.

== Tourist attractions ==
=== Los Haitises National park ===
Los Haitises, one of the largest National Parks in the Dominican Republic (with a total area of almost 1,200 square kilometers), is located in the Northeast region of the country, specifically in Sabana de la Mar. Haitises comes from the indigenous word "Jaitises", which means "High Land" or "Land of Mountains", in the aboriginal language. Excursions through Los Haitises offer the possibility of discovering the largest mangrove reserve in the Caribbean, caves with pictographs and petroglyphs of Taino origin, and a humid forest of lush vegetation that keeps endemic and migratory birds as well as endangered species.

=== Salto de Jalda waterfall ===
The Salto de Jalda waterfall is the highest in the Caribbean, more than 120 meters high. Guarded by the copious forest of the Salto La Jalda National Park and hidden among the steep mountains that form the belt of the Eastern Cordillera, La Jalda is the highest and most attractive in Sabana de la Mar.

== Climate ==
Climate data for Sabana de la Mar (1991–2020)
Month	Jan	Feb	Mar	Apr	May	Jun	Jul	Aug	Sep	Oct	Nov	Dec	Year
Mean daily maximum °C (°F)	28.2 (82.8)	28.6 (83.5)	29.2 (84.6)	29.8 (85.6)	30.6 (87.1)	31.2 (88.2)	31.4 (88.5)	31.5 (88.7)	31.6 (88.9)	31.3 (88.3)	29.9 (85.8)	29.0 (84.2)	30.2 (86.4)
Daily mean °C (°F)	23.4 (74.1)	23.6 (74.5)	24.1 (75.4)	24.9 (76.8)	25.8 (78.4)	26.5 (79.7)	26.7 (80.1)	26.7 (80.1)	26.7 (80.1)	26.3 (79.3)	25.2 (77.4)	24.2 (75.6)	25.4 (77.7)
Mean daily minimum °C (°F)	18.6 (65.5)	18.5 (65.3)	19.0 (66.2)	20.1 (68.2)	21.1 (70.0)	21.9 (71.4)	22.1 (71.8)	22.0 (71.6)	21.9 (71.4)	21.3 (70.3)	20.5 (68.9)	19.4 (66.9)	20.5 (68.9)
Average precipitation mm (inches)	147.5 (5.81)	108.1 (4.26)	101.9 (4.01)	154.4 (6.08)	250.3 (9.85)	176.9 (6.96)	200.0 (7.87)	231.7 (9.12)	224.3 (8.83)	244.7 (9.63)	285.0 (11.22)	175.5 (6.91)	2,300.2 (90.56)
Source: NOAA

Climate data for Sabana de la Mar (1971–2000)
Month	Jan	Feb	Mar	Apr	May	Jun	Jul	Aug	Sep	Oct	Nov	Dec	Year
Record high °C (°F)	32.4 (90.3)	33.4 (92.1)	34.0 (93.2)	35.0 (95.0)	39.0 (102.2)	35.4 (95.7)	35.0 (95.0)	35.0 (95.0)	35.0 (95.0)	36.4 (97.5)	34.0 (93.2)	33.4 (92.1)	39.0 (102.2)
Mean daily maximum °C (°F)	28.0 (82.4)	28.1 (82.6)	28.7 (83.7)	29.4 (84.9)	30.1 (86.2)	30.8 (87.4)	30.9 (87.6)	30.9 (87.6)	31.1 (88.0)	30.7 (87.3)	29.7 (85.5)	28.5 (83.3)	29.7 (85.5)
Daily mean °C (°F)	23.4 (74.1)	23.4 (74.1)	23.9 (75.0)	24.8 (76.6)	25.6 (78.1)	26.3 (79.3)	26.5 (79.7)	26.5 (79.7)	26.4 (79.5)	26.0 (78.8)	25.2 (77.4)	24.0 (75.2)	25.2 (77.3)
Mean daily minimum °C (°F)	18.8 (65.8)	18.7 (65.7)	19.2 (66.6)	20.1 (68.2)	21.2 (70.2)	21.9 (71.4)	22.1 (71.8)	22.0 (71.6)	21.7 (71.1)	21.3 (70.3)	20.7 (69.3)	19.5 (67.1)	20.6 (69.1)
Record low °C (°F)	14.0 (57.2)	13.5 (56.3)	11.5 (52.7)	14.0 (57.2)	15.8 (60.4)	17.0 (62.6)	18.0 (64.4)	19.8 (67.6)	19.0 (66.2)	18.5 (65.3)	16.4 (61.5)	13.5 (56.3)	11.5 (52.7)
Average rainfall mm (inches)	149.0 (5.87)	124.6 (4.91)	121.9 (4.80)	157.8 (6.21)	237.9 (9.37)	183.9 (7.24)	200.5 (7.89)	234.4 (9.23)	224.1 (8.82)	239.6 (9.43)	304.4 (11.98)	177.2 (6.98)	2,355.3 (92.73)
Average rainy days (≥ 1.0 mm)	14.0	11.6	10.8	9.6	15.2	12.7	16.7	16.7	17.0	16.2	18.0	15.9	174.4
Average relative humidity (%)	83.1	81.9	80.5	79.6	82.1	82.5	82.4	83.2	83.7	84.4	84.3	83.7	82.6
Source: ONAMET

Climate data for Sabana de la Mar (1961–1990)
Month	Jan	Feb	Mar	Apr	May	Jun	Jul	Aug	Sep	Oct	Nov	Dec	Year
Record high °C (°F)	32.4 (90.3)	33.4 (92.1)	33.4 (92.1)	35.0 (95.0)	35.0 (95.0)	34.6 (94.3)	35.0 (95.0)	35.0 (95.0)	34.6 (94.3)	36.8 (98.2)	34.0 (93.2)	33.0 (91.4)	36.8 (98.2)
Mean daily maximum °C (°F)	27.8 (82.0)	27.9 (82.2)	28.4 (83.1)	29.0 (84.2)	29.7 (85.5)	30.3 (86.5)	30.4 (86.7)	30.5 (86.9)	30.7 (87.3)	30.5 (86.9)	29.4 (84.9)	28.2 (82.8)	29.4 (84.9)
Daily mean °C (°F)	23.3 (73.9)	23.3 (73.9)	23.8 (74.8)	24.6 (76.3)	25.4 (77.7)	26.0 (78.8)	26.3 (79.3)	26.3 (79.3)	26.2 (79.2)	25.9 (78.6)	25.0 (77.0)	23.9 (75.0)	25.0 (77.0)
Mean daily minimum °C (°F)	18.8 (65.8)	18.8 (65.8)	19.3 (66.7)	20.1 (68.2)	21.2 (70.2)	21.8 (71.2)	22.3 (72.1)	22.1 (71.8)	21.8 (71.2)	21.4 (70.5)	20.7 (69.3)	19.6 (67.3)	20.7 (69.3)
Record low °C (°F)	11.5 (52.7)	12.0 (53.6)	12.8 (55.0)	14.0 (57.2)	15.5 (59.9)	14.6 (58.3)	16.6 (61.9)	16.5 (61.7)	16.0 (60.8)	15.0 (59.0)	14.0 (57.2)	13.0 (55.4)	11.5 (52.7)
Average rainfall mm (inches)	134.5 (5.30)	107.0 (4.21)	122.5 (4.82)	162.1 (6.38)	255.1 (10.04)	200.1 (7.88)	183.1 (7.21)	232.4 (9.15)	196.2 (7.72)	218.5 (8.60)	268.3 (10.56)	183.1 (7.21)	2,262.9 (89.09)
Average rainy days (≥ 1.0 mm)	12.8	9.6	9.7	8.9	15.3	13.8	15.9	16.1	15.5	15.5	15.7	15.1	163.9
Average relative humidity (%)	83.6	82.0	80.8	80.1	83.2	83.7	83.5	84.2	84.6	85.0	84.8	84.1	83.3
Source: NOAA

== Notable Resident ==
- Luis Severino, baseball player

== Sources ==
- – World-Gazetteer.com
