= Guayabo Dulce =

- Location within the Dominican Republic
- Coordinates: 18°39′0″N 69°16′48″W
- Country: Dominican Republic
- Province: Hato Mayor

Population (2008)
  - Total: 4,082

Guayabo Dulce is a town in the Hato Mayor province of the Dominican Republic.

== Sources ==
- – World-Gazetteer.com
