= Clarissa Molina =

Dominican model and actress (born 1991)

- Molina at the 27th Annual Latin Grammy Awards, 2026
- Born: Clarissa Molina Contreras; September 23, 1991 (age 35); Santiago, Dominican Republic
- Occupations: Actress, model/co-host at El Gordo y la Flaca
- Height: 1.75 m (5 ft 9 in)
- Beauty pageant titleholder
- Title: Miss Dominican Republic Tourism International 2012; Miss Latina New Jersey USA 2013; Miss Dominican Republic 2015; Nuestra Belleza Latina VIP 2016
- Hair color: Brown
- Eye color: Brown
- Major competitions: Miss Tourism International 2012 (Unplaced); Miss Dominican Republic US 2012; (1st runner-up); Nuestra Belleza Latina 2015 (4th place); Miss Universe 2015 (Top 10); Nuestra Belleza Latina 2016 (Winner)

Clarissa Molina Contreras (born September 23, 1991) is a Dominican actress, model and beauty pageant titleholder who won Miss Dominican Republic 2015 and represented the Dominican Republic at the Miss Universe 2015 pageant. She later won the title of Nuestra Belleza Latina 2016 after having placed third Runner-Up the previous year. She is the winner of Mira Quien Baila All-Stars 2019, and now works as a reporter with Univision in El Gordo y La Flaca.

== Personal life ==
Molina was born in Santiago de los Caballeros, Dominican Republic and is the daughter of Domingo Molina and Clara Contreras. At the age of 11, her parents separated and moved to New York City. She was left in the Dominican Republic with her stepmother. At age 15 she and her siblings moved to New Jersey with their uncle and cousins. She resides in Miami, Florida after winning the Nuestra Belleza Latina pageant. She holds both Dominican and American citizenships.

== Pageantry ==
=== Nuestra Belleza Latina 2015 ===
Molina auditioned for Univision's reality show and beauty pageant Nuestra Belleza Latina 2015 in New York City on October 4, 2014. Judge Jomari Goyso and guest judges Daniel Arenas and Veronica Bastos did not give her a pass to enter the competition due to them seeing her as arrogant. Days later head judge Osmel Sousa went to her home in New Jersey to personally invite her to be part of the competition. After several eliminations, she was selected to be part of the 12 finalists who enter the mansion of Nuestra Belleza Latina where she became a favorite among both the judges and audience. After 13 weeks of competition, she made it to the Top 4 and finished as third Runner-Up. The eventual winner was Francisca Lachapel of the Dominican Republic.

=== Miss Dominican Republic 2015 ===
After Clarissa had finished competing in Nuestra Belleza Latina Clarissa competed in Miss Dominican Republic 2015 representing the province of Espaillat where she was eventually crowned the winner, earning the right to represent the country at the 2015 Miss Universe pageant.

=== Miss Universe 2015 ===
Clarissa represented the Dominican Republic at Miss Universe 2015 where she competed to succeed outgoing titleholder Paulina Vega of Colombia. She became the favorite of the analysts to win the title based on her preliminary performance. On the coronation night, she eventually finished in the Top 10. A later evaluate give her the sixth place. The eventual winner was Pia Wurtzbach of the Philippines. She is one of the candidates who consoled Wurtzbach after the latter won the title.

=== NBL VIP 2016 - Nuestra Belleza Latina 2016 ===
In 2016, Clarissa Molina was chosen by the production of Nuestra Belleza Latina to compete in Nuestra Belleza Latina 2016. The season was referred to as "NBL VIP" and was the shows first All Star season, consisting of twenty-six returning non-winning/runner up contestants representing the shows nine seasons for a second chance to win the title. On May 22, 2016, after 6 weeks of competition Clarissa Molina was crowned as Nuestra Belleza Latina 2016, making her the second Dominican to obtain the title, after Francisca Lachapel in 2015. Clarissa and Francisca's wins made the Dominican Republic the first nation to obtain crowns in two consecutive years. Clarissa's win also ties the Dominican Republic and Mexico for the second most wins, each nation obtaining two crowns. She is also the second winner to have been born in the 1990s after Marisela de Montecristo.

== Career ==
Molina currently works as a social media correspondent on the TV show El Gordo y la Flaca.

Awards and achievements
Preceded by (Dominican Republic) Francisca Lachapel	Nuestra Belleza Latina; 2016	Succeeded by (Venezuela) Migbelis Castellanos
Preceded by Kimberly Castillo	Miss Dominican Republic; 2015	Succeeded by Rosalba García
Preceded by Luz María Reinoso Suárez	Miss Espaillat; 2015	Succeeded by Rossy Reyes
Preceded by (Mexico) Aly Villegas	Nuestra Belleza Latina third Runner-Up; 2015	Succeeded by (Colombia) Bárbara Turbay
Preceded by Nathalie Muñoz	Miss Dominican Republic US first Runner-Up; 2012	Succeeded by Vanessa Contreras
