= Plaza de la Bandera =

Plaza and roundabout in Guadalajara, Jalisco, Mexico

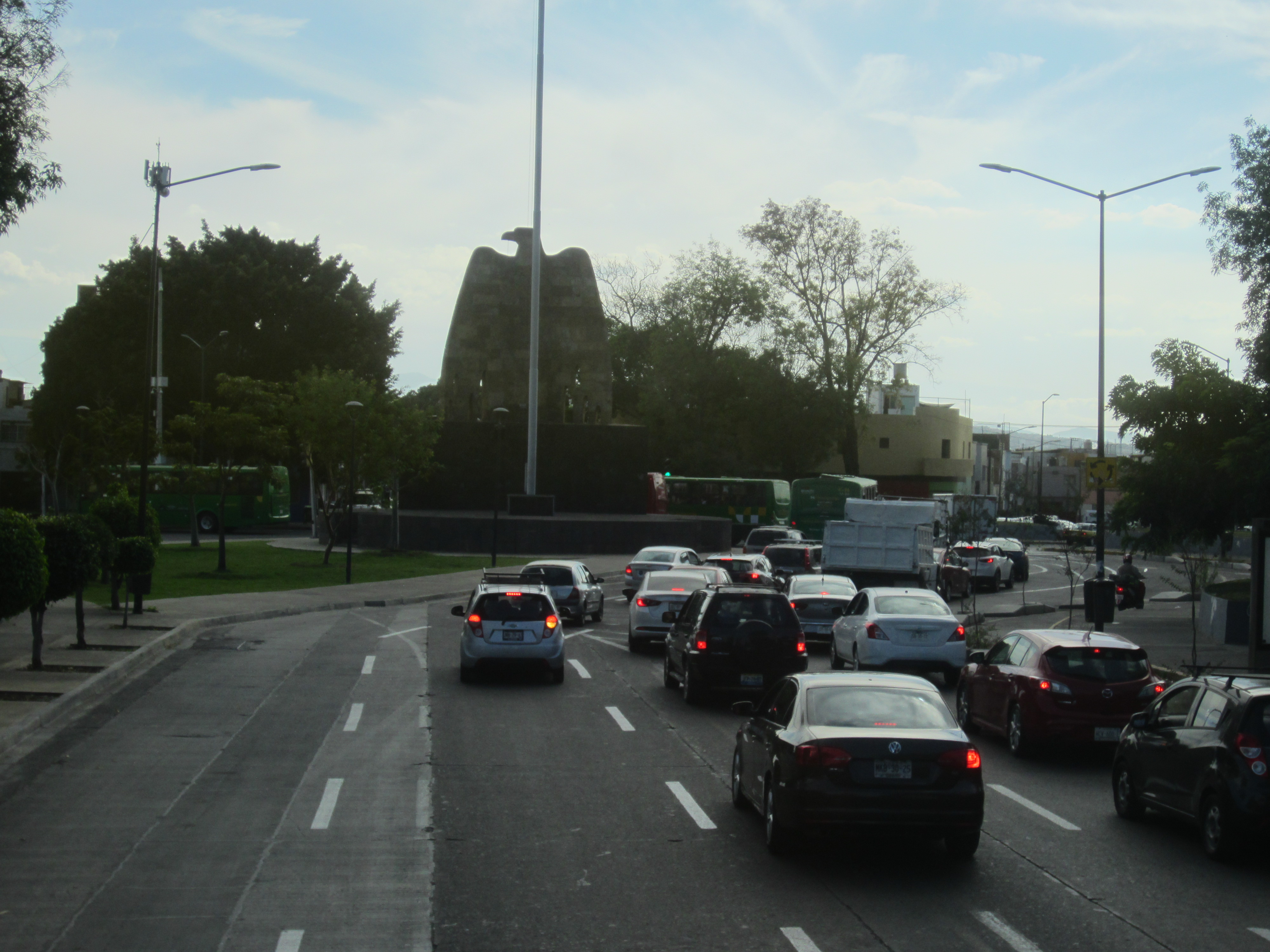
- Traffic circling the roundabout, 2021
- Location: Guadalajara, Jalisco Mexico
- Location within Mexico
- Coordinates: 20°39′49″N 103°20′1″W

Plaza de la Bandera is a plaza and roundabout in Guadalajara, in the Mexican state of Jalisco. In 1943, a stone sculpture of an eagle and flagpole were installed in the roundabout.

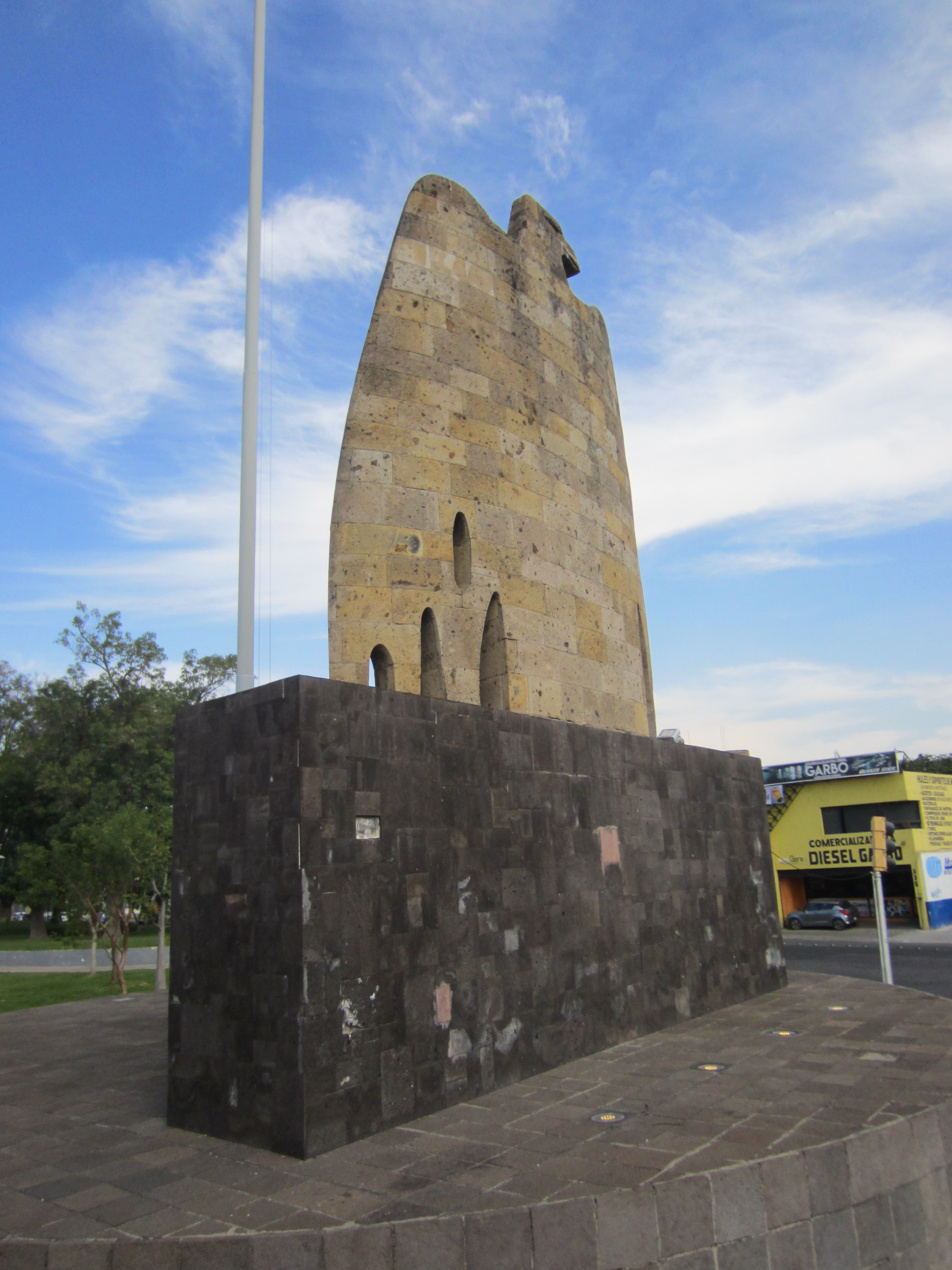
Stone sculpture of an eagle and flagpole
