= Tony Dandrades =

Dominican journalist (born 1968)

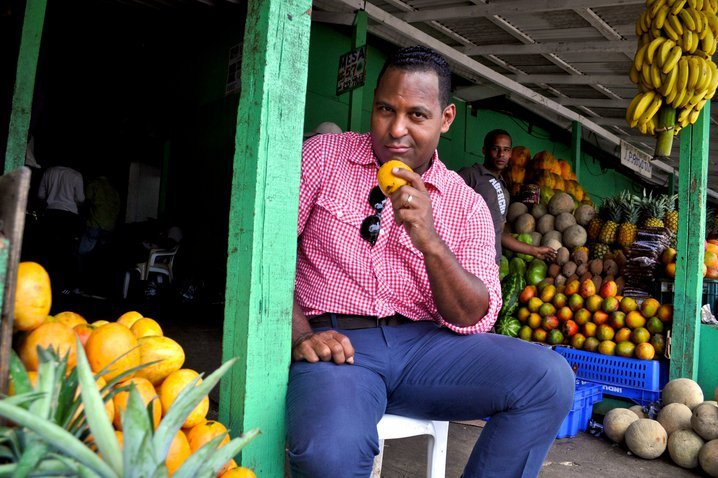
- Tony Dandrades in Santo Domingo
- Born: June 17, 1968 (age 58); Santo Domingo, Dominican Republic
- Citizenship: United States
- Education: Inter-American University of Puerto Rico (BA in Mass Communications)
- Occupation: Journalist television personality
- Years active: 1992-present
- Employer: Univision
- Television: Primer Impacto
- Spouse: Amy Rose Reyes (married 2003-present)
- Children: 4 children

Tony Dandrades (born June 17, 1968) is a Dominican journalist and television personality who works at the Univision Network. He is currently the entertainment reporter/anchor for the five o'clock news magazine show Primer Impacto.

He is known for his tagline, "¡Qué bien!" He is celebrated with a mural of his likeness in Santiago, Dominican Republic that bears the tagline.

== Career ==
On finishing his studies in communication at the Interamerican University in Puerto Rico, Dandrades worked at Puerto Rican television and radio stations before he found new opportunities on the radio in Miami. He then began work at the South Florida Univision affiliate.

Dandrades worked for five years as a weekend weatherman at Channel 23 in Miami. He was known for his live reports from festivals and cultural events, in which he mixed weather reporting with entertainment. He gained a cult following with Miami residents because of his "spontaneous and charismatic" style of reporting.

In 1997, Dandrades left Channel 23 to work on Primer Impacto where he has worked on several high profile projects, including team coverage of September 11.

Dandrades has traveled extensively throughout Latin America and across the U.S. covering stories for “Primer Impacto” and “Ver Para Creer”, a weekend publication similar to the English language CBS show Sunday Morning. He has broadcast from the last four World Cup tournaments in Korea and Japan, Germany, South Africa and Brazil. He has also hosted events and festivals, lending his time to telethons and other charity events.

In 2015, Dandrades appeared on Sesame Amigos beside Elmo in three segments.

In 2021 Dandrades participated in the television dance competition, "Mira Quién Baila (Look Who's Dancing)." His chosen charity to be supported by his appearance was ALPA, the Afro-Latino Association for Policy & Advocacy.

Dandrades operates a Spanish language Youtube channel titled "Tony Dandrades," that, as of June 2026, had 348,000 subscribers. His content primarily focuses on Hispanic (Latin American and Caribbean) pop culture and celebrities. He also posts his personal interviews previously aired on (or are unpublished but were produced for,) Primer Impacto.

== Honors and awards ==
In 2018, Dandrades and his team on Primer Impacto were nominated for an "Outstanding Coverage of a Breaking News Story in Spanish" News and Documentary Emmy Award for their coverage of the effects of Hurricane Maria on Puerto Rico, titled, "Unidos en el Dolor: Huracán María en Puerto Rico (United in Pain: Hurricane Maria in Puerto Rico)."

He was again nominated, along with his colleagues at Univision, in 2020 for Premer Impacto, in the category "Outstanding Newscast or News Magazine in Spanish" for the 40th News and Documentary Emmy Awards.

A third nomination came in 2021, when Dandrades was nominated for an Annual News and Documentary Emmy Award with his colleagues at Premier Impacto for their coverage of George Floyd, titled "Cobertura de George Floyd" again in the category "Outstanding Coverage of a Breaking News Story in Spanish."

A tribute episode of El Show del Mediodía, a Dominican television program, was produced and aired in Dandrades' honor. He appeared via video call on the episode. The episode aired in May 2020.

== Controversies ==
In May 2020, Dandrades, along with Univision, was sued by fellow television host Frederick Martínez (also known as El Pachá) who alleged discriminatory internal business practices and discrediting Dominican television and hosts. The lawsuit was filed with the FCC. During the above mentioned tribute episode of El Show del Mediodía, on which Martínez is a host, Martínez stated that Dandrades, "has done his job, but hasn't really made a name for himself. He does a one-minute-thirty-second story for 20 years. They write the questions for him, they send him the cameraman; that's how you do it well" (Translated from Spanish). Martínez later apologized for the interaction. Dandrades responded in an interview with Alejandra Espinoza on Break de las 7, stating that Martínez's comments were rooted in racism. In September 2020, Dandrades threatened legal action against Martínez through his legal counsel, alleging that his reputation had been damaged by Martínez's, "systematic aggression" in public statements about Dandrades.

== Personal life ==
Dandrades is married and has four children. He has spoken openly about his experiences with racism, including accusations of being a diversity hire for Univision and criticisms of his interracial marriage.

He fell victim to an identity theft scam in 2019 that targeted minor celebrities using WhatsApp.
