= Hato Mayor del Rey =

City in the Dominican Republic

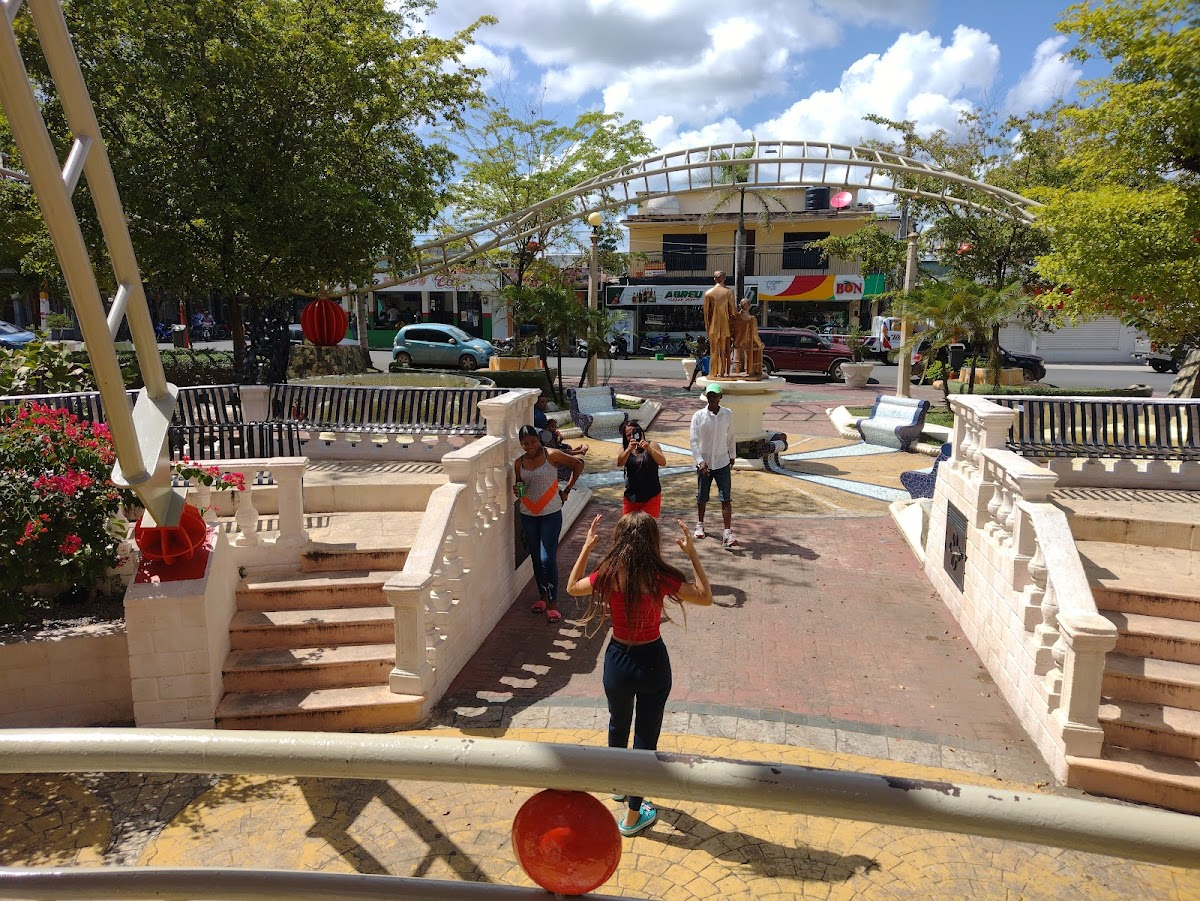
- Mercedes de la Rocha Plaza

- Coat of arms

- Location within the Dominican Republic
- Coordinates: 18°46′12″N 69°15′36″W
- Country: Dominican Republic
- Province: Hato Mayor
- Founded: 1520
- Municipality since: 1843

Area
  - Total: 659.65 km^{2} (254.69 sq mi)
- Elevation: 102 m (335 ft)

Population (2012)
  - Total: 70,141
  - Density: 106.33/km^{2} (275.40/sq mi)
  - Urban: 61,576
- Distance to – Santo Domingo: 110 km
- Municipalities: 3
- Climate: Am

Hato Mayor del Rey is the capital of Hato Mayor Province, Dominican Republic. It is bordered on the North by the municipalities of El Valle and Sabana de la Mar, on the South by the San Pedro de Macorís Province, on the East by the El Seibo Province and on the West by the municipality of Bayaguana, Monte Plata. It is located 27 kilometers from the San Pedro de Macorís Province and 110 kilometers from the capital city of Santo Domingo. Hato Mayor del Rey has a population of 70,141 inhabitants, and is divided into three municipal districts: Yerba Buena, Guayabo Dulce and Mata Palacio.

== Etymology ==
Directly translated into English, it means Great Herd of the King or King's Great Herd. The name stems from the colonial period in the 16th century, in which Hato Mayor del Rey was among the largest herding regions of Hispaniola and served King Charles I.

== History ==
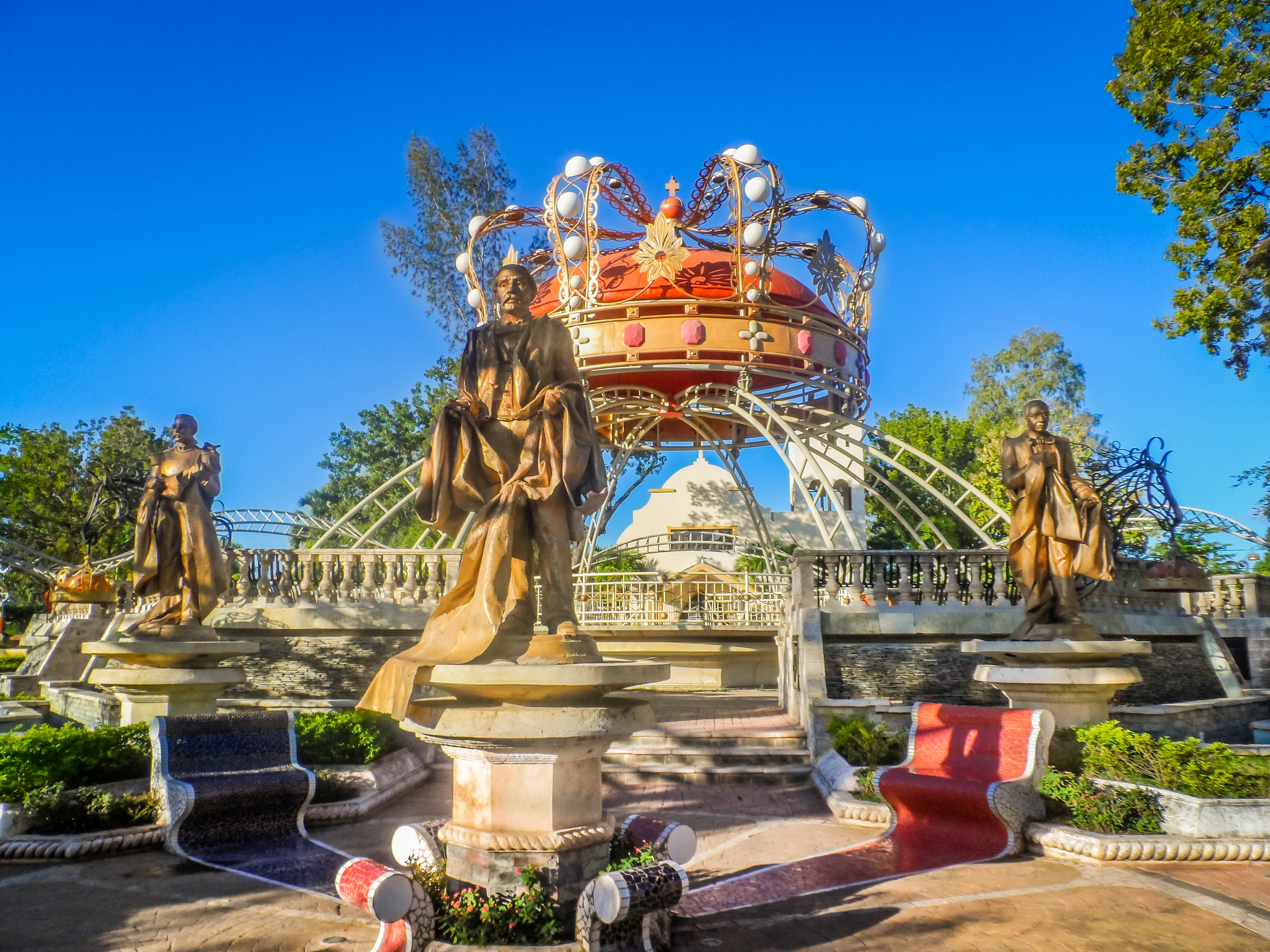
Central park of Hato Mayor. The local Roman Catholic parish can be seen behind the roundabout.

Hato Mayor del Rey was founded around the year 1520 by Francisco Dávila as land that was dedicated to cattle and agriculture. Francisco Dávila, in his position as Treasurer and Perpetual Royal Regidor in Hispaniola, established the Majorat of Dávila on 23 August 1554 in the city of Santo Domingo, in the presence of his nephew Gaspar Dávila. The lands of Hato Mayor del Rey then formed a part of Dávila's majorat.

Over time, Hato Mayor del Rey passed through the hands of several heirs and keepers. In 1746, Don Antonio Coca y Vevers Landeche, who was the perpetual manager of the Majorat of Dávila, founded Hato Mayor del Rey as a village. The village included a hermitage dedicated to Our Lady of Mercy to encourage people living near the estate to practice Catholicism.

Until July 1843, Hato Mayor del Rey was part of the community of El Seibo and the province of El Seibo. After 1843, Hato Mayor del Rey became its own independent community by decree of the occupying Haitian forces under Charles Rivière-Hérard. On 9 June 1845, Hato Mayor del Rey's independent community status was lost under law No. 40 of the Provincial Administration, reverting it to a military outpost of El Seibo. On 13 October 1848, Dominican President Manuel Jiménes, proclaimed the community of Hato Mayor del Rey an independent town by Decree No. 174 of the Conservative Council and the Chamber of Tribunes. During the Annexation, Hato Mayor del Rey was converted into a military base in charge of the protection of El Seibo.

On 14 December 1888, Mrs. María de las Mercedes de la Rocha y Landeche and her husband Esteban Fernández de Coca, before the presence of Ramón María Gautreaux, Secretary and Treasurer of the township, and Antonio Lluberes and Manuel Mañón, witnesses, donated 1,070,879.41 m^{2} to the City Council of Hato Mayor del Rey.

=== Hato Mayor del Rey park ===
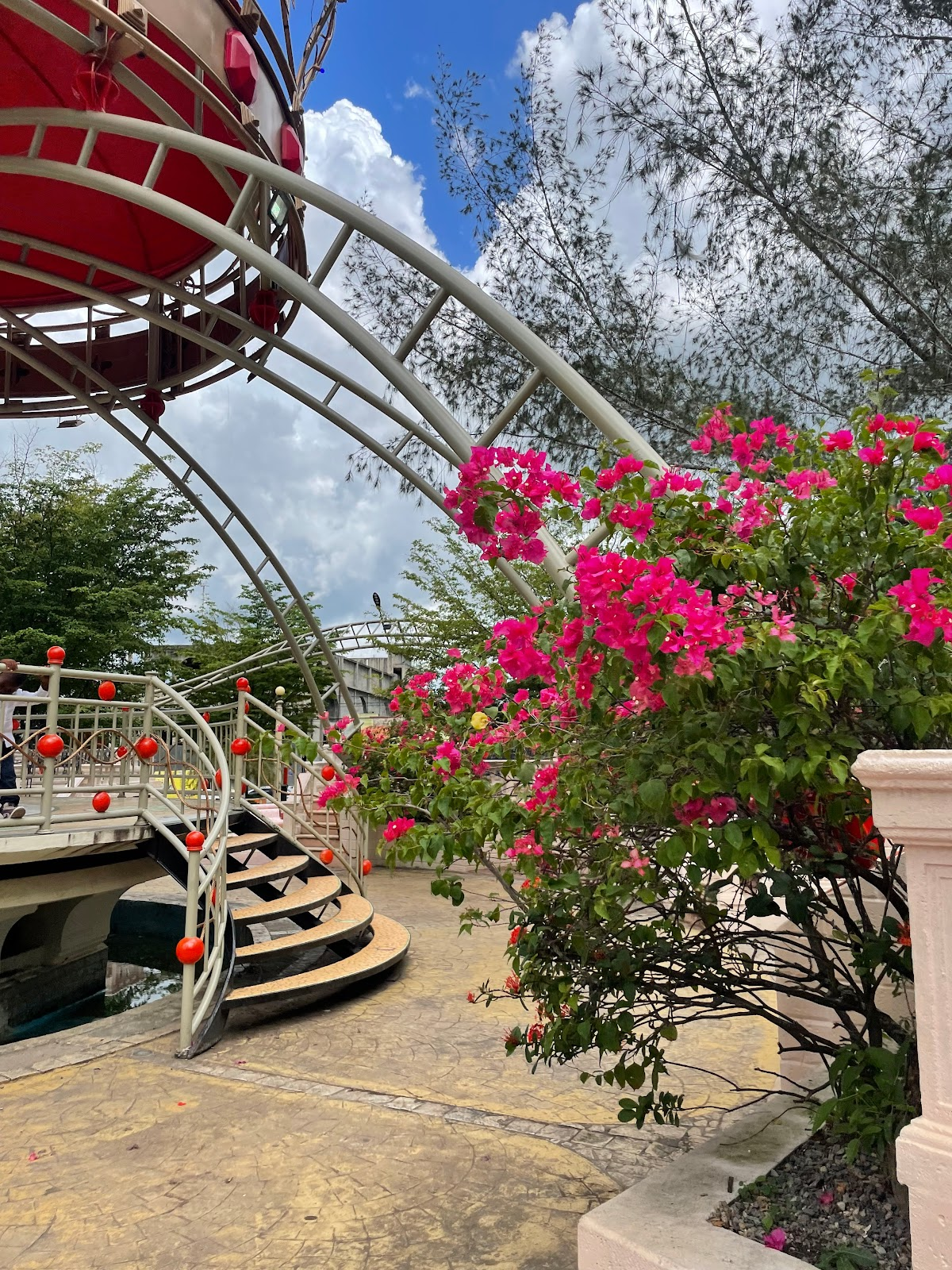

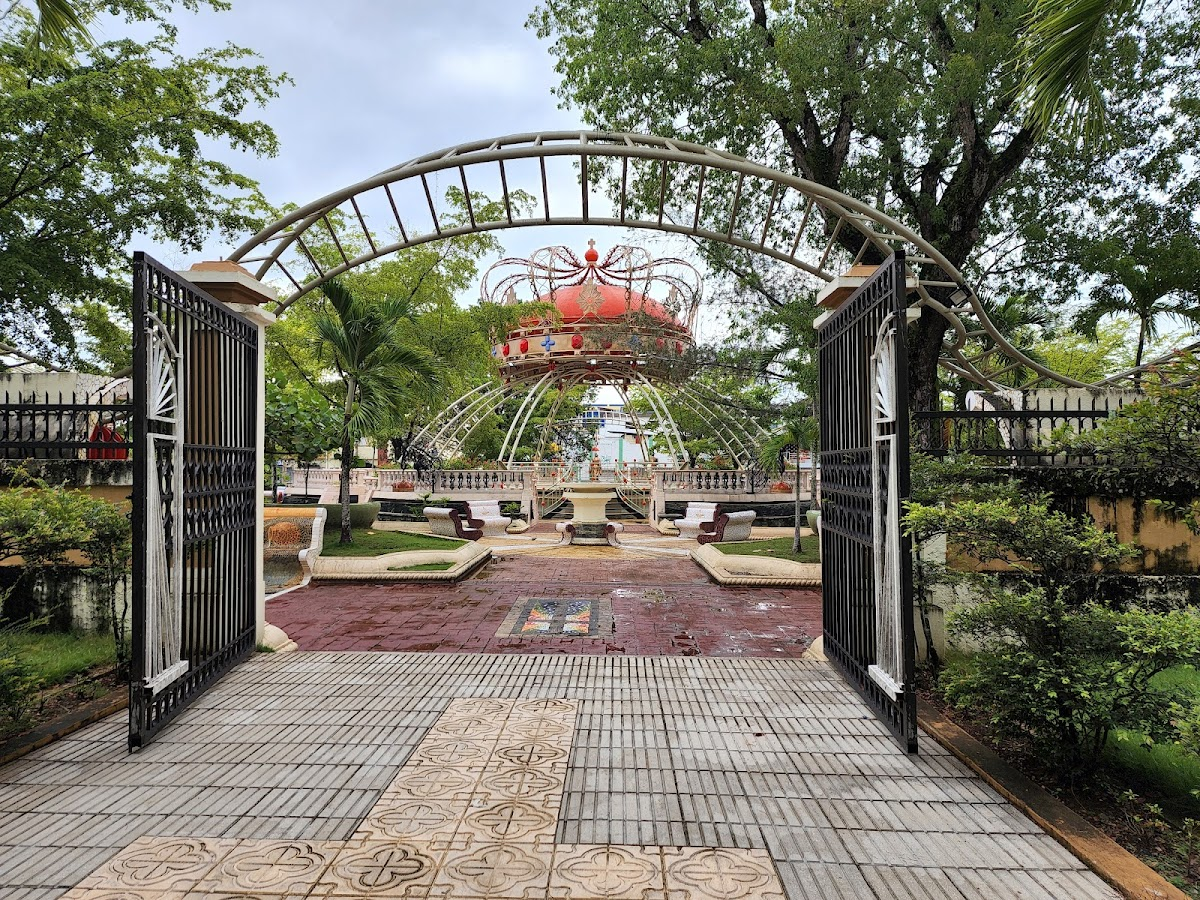

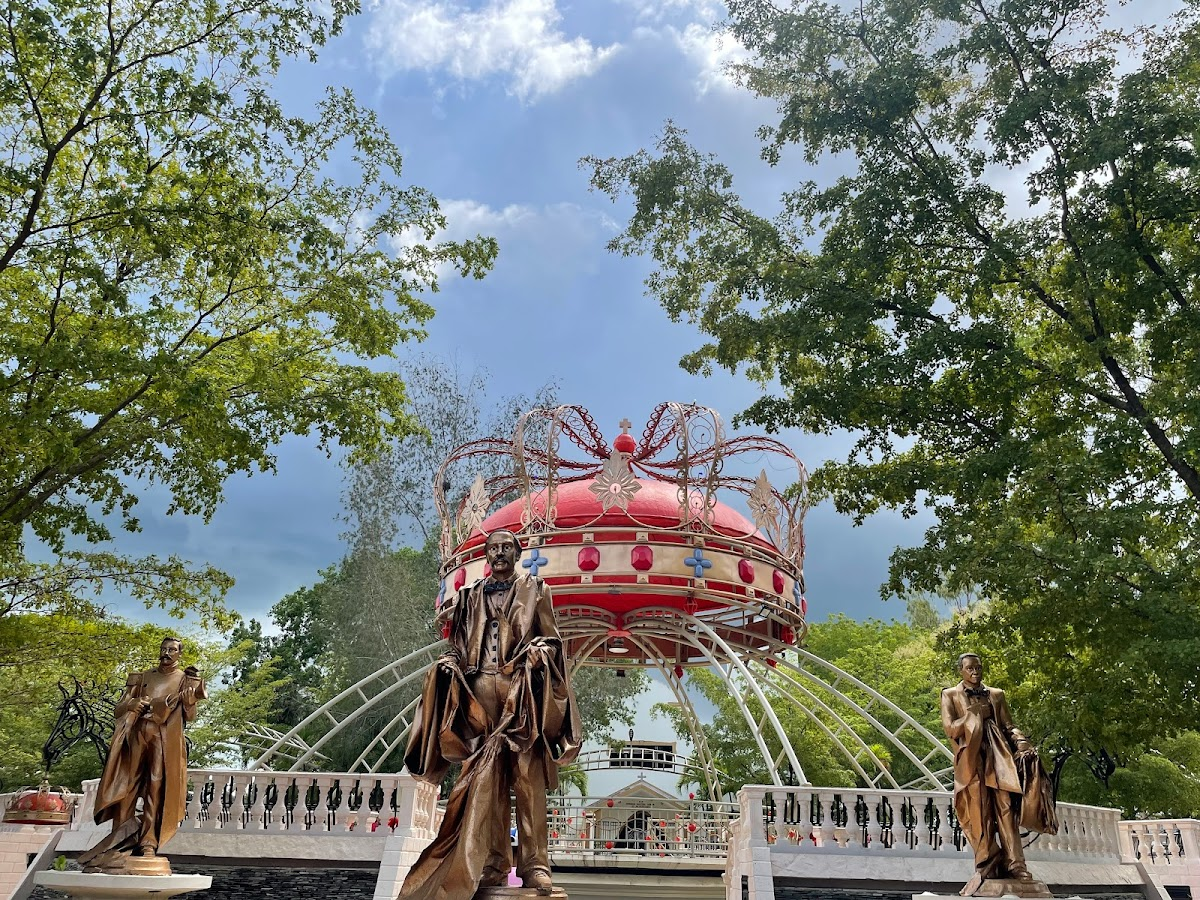

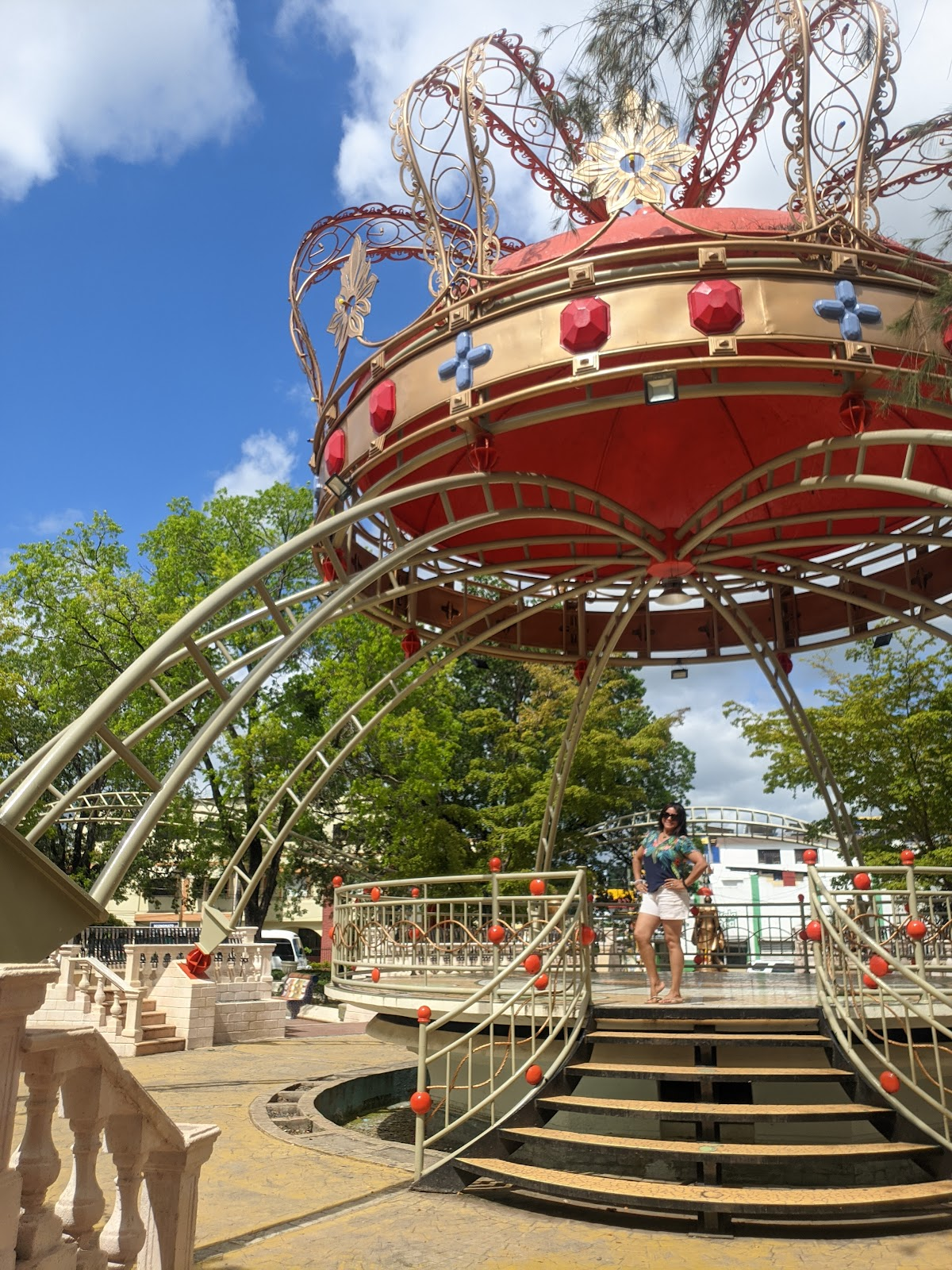

== Climate ==
Hato Mayor del Rey has a tropical monsoon climate (Köppen Am) a little wetter in its driest month than a tropical savanna climate (Aw) would be. The weather is hot and humid all year round, with a drier and less unpleasant season from December to March and a wetter, even hotter season between April and November.

Climate data for Hato Mayor del Rey (1961-1990)
| Month | Jan | Feb | Mar | Apr | May | Jun | Jul | Aug | Sep | Oct | Nov | Dec | Year |
|---|---|---|---|---|---|---|---|---|---|---|---|---|---|
| Record high °C (°F) | 35.0 (95.0) | 37.2 (99.0) | 38.0 (100.4) | 39.0 (102.2) | 37.8 (100.0) | 37.4 (99.3) | 37.6 (99.7) | 39.0 (102.2) | 38.0 (100.4) | 37.6 (99.7) | 36.0 (96.8) | 35.5 (95.9) | 39.0 (102.2) |
| Mean daily maximum °C (°F) | 30.2 (86.4) | 30.6 (87.1) | 31.5 (88.7) | 31.9 (89.4) | 32.4 (90.3) | 33.1 (91.6) | 33.6 (92.5) | 33.5 (92.3) | 33.1 (91.6) | 32.6 (90.7) | 31.2 (88.2) | 30.1 (86.2) | 32.0 (89.6) |
| Mean daily minimum °C (°F) | 17.6 (63.7) | 17.5 (63.5) | 18.3 (64.9) | 19.1 (66.4) | 20.6 (69.1) | 21.4 (70.5) | 21.4 (70.5) | 21.3 (70.3) | 21.1 (70.0) | 20.7 (69.3) | 19.8 (67.6) | 18.6 (65.5) | 19.8 (67.6) |
| Record low °C (°F) | 12.0 (53.6) | 11.9 (53.4) | 12.1 (53.8) | 13.3 (55.9) | 14.5 (58.1) | 14.8 (58.6) | 15.4 (59.7) | 16.9 (62.4) | 16.9 (62.4) | 16.6 (61.9) | 14.4 (57.9) | 12.9 (55.2) | 11.9 (53.4) |
| Average rainfall mm (inches) | 51.5 (2.03) | 42.0 (1.65) | 59.7 (2.35) | 116.5 (4.59) | 216.3 (8.52) | 187.9 (7.40) | 120.0 (4.72) | 187.2 (7.37) | 209.5 (8.25) | 219.0 (8.62) | 110.6 (4.35) | 62.0 (2.44) | 1,582.2 (62.29) |
| Average rainy days (≥ 1.0 mm) | 5.4 | 4.9 | 5.4 | 6.7 | 12.2 | 9.9 | 8.9 | 10.8 | 12.7 | 12.6 | 8.1 | 6.9 | 104.5 |
Source: NOAA

== Notable Resident ==
- Antonio Bastardo (major league baseball pitcher, Philadelphia Phillies)
