= Hato Mayor Province =

Province of the Dominican Republic

Hato Mayor del Rey
- Province
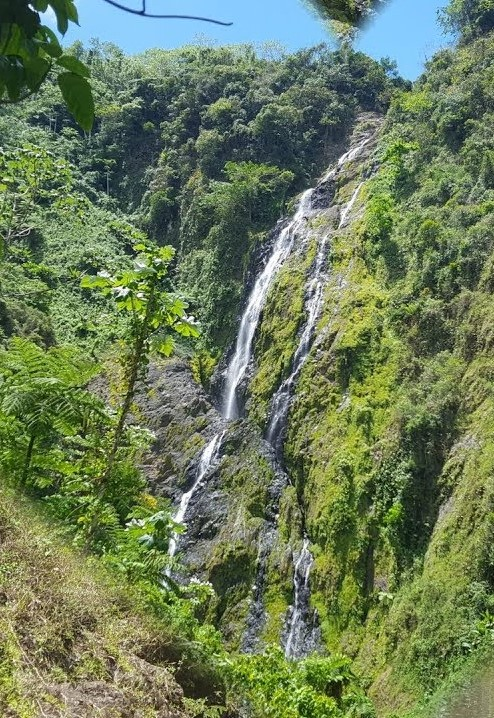
- Salto de Jalda waterfall in Hato Mayor, Dominican Republic

- Location of the Hato Mayor Province
- Country: Dominican Republic
- Province since: 1984
- Capital: Hato Mayor del Rey

Government
  - Type: Subdivisions
  - Body: 3 municipalities 4 municipal districts
  - Congresspersons: 1 Senator; 2 Deputies

Area
  - Total: 1,319.3 km^{2} (509.4 sq mi)

Population (2022)
  - Total: 100,133
  - Density: 75.899/km^{2} (196.58/sq mi)
- Time zone: UTC-4 (EST)
- Area code: 1-809 1-829 1-849
- ISO 3166-2: DO-30
- Postal Code: 25000

Hato Mayor (Spanish pronunciation: [ˈato maˈʝoɾ]) is a province of the Dominican Republic. It was split from El Seibo in 1984. It is spread over an area of 1,319.3 km^{2} (509.4 sq mi), and has its capital at Hato Mayor del Rey. As per the 2022 census, it had a population of 100,133 inhabitants.

== History ==
The region was part of the El Seibo Province earlier, and it was created as a new province in 1984. Hato Mayor literally translates to "Largest cattle farm of the King" in Spanish.

== Geography ==
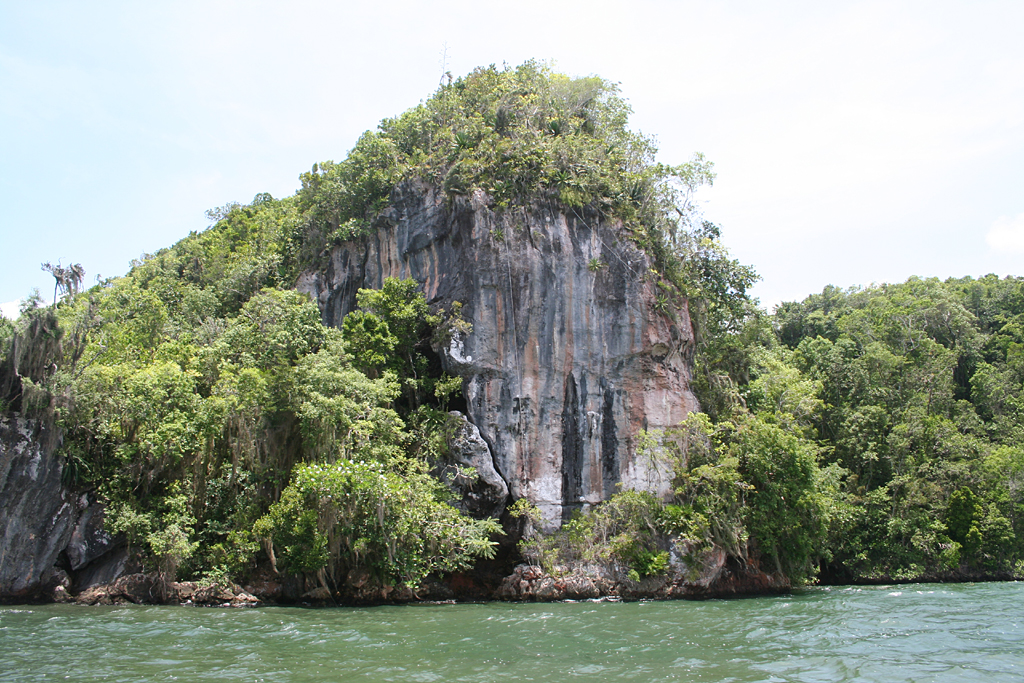
Los Haitises national park

Hato Mayor is one of the 31 provinces of the Dominican Republic. It is spread over an area of 1,319.3 km^{2} (509.4 sq mi). It is bordered by the Bay of Samana to the north, El Seibo Province to the east, San Pedro de Macorís to the south and Samana Province to the west. The Eastern Range (Cordillera Oriental or Sierra del Seibo), is located along the north of the province.

=== Climate and vegetation ===
The province has a tropical rainforest climate (Köppen climate classification: Af). It has an average annual temperature is 25.51 °C (77.92 °F), and receives an average annual rainfall of 8.17 cm (3.22 in) annually. The rains occur between May and November with the remaining months being predominantly dry.

About 357.21 km^{2} (137.92 sq mi) land area is covered by forests, which makes up 28.8% of the area of the province. About 207.55 km^{2} (80.14 sq mi) of this is protected, and forms part of four protected areas. Agricultural and pastoral lands cover an area of 709.7 km^{2} (274.0 sq mi) in the province.

== Administration ==
Its capital city is Hato Mayor del Rey. The province is divided into three municipalities, which are further subdivided into four municipal districts.

- El Valle
- Hato Mayor del Rey
  - Guayabo Dulce (D.M.)
  - Mata Palacio (D.M.)
  - Yerba Buena (D.M.)
- Sabana de la Mar
  - Elupina Cordero de las Cañitas (D.M.)

== Demographics ==
According to the 2022 census, the province had a population of 100,133 inhabitants. The population consisted of 50,294 females (50.2%) and 49,839 males (49.8%). About 25.8% of the population was below the age of 15 years, 64.3% belonged to the age group of 15–64 years, and 9.9% was aged 65 years or older. The province had an urban population of 76,703 inhabitants (76.6%) and a rural population of 23,430 inhabitants (23.4%).

== Economy ==
The economy is mainly based on agriculture and livestock rearing. The name "Hato" itself came from livestock, which has been historically significant to the economy of the region. Major agricultural produce include fruits like coffee, citrus fruits, cocoa bean, and coconut.
