= Rarotonga (comics) =

- Cover to Rarotonga #564 (Sept. 1973)

Publication information
- Publisher: EDAR
- Format: Limited series
- Genre: Romantic fantasy

Rarotonga was a Mexican comic book series in the Lágrimas, Risas y Amor comics published by EDAR which appeared between 1951 and 1998. The main character of the comic series was Rarotonga, a jungle queen of an island of the same name who occupied her days dancing and romancing travelers. Within the publication were tears, laughter and love, and dedicated to mostly romantic-themed storylines.

In 1978 a Mexican film of the same name directed by Raúl Ramírez was made using material from the comic. In 1992, the Mexican band Café Tacuba wrote a song called "Rarotonga" about the comic.

== See also ==
- El pecado de Oyuki
- María Isabel
- Rubí
- Yesenia
- Gabriel y Gabriela
- Alondra
- Memin Pinguin
