= El pecado de Oyuki (comics) =

Publication information
- Publisher: Editorial Argumentos (EDAR)
- Schedule: Weekly
- Publication date: 1975 - 1977
- No. of issues: 137

Creative team
- Created by: Yolanda Vargas Dulché
- Written by: Yolanda Vargas Dulché
- Artist: Antonio Gutiérrez

El pecado de Oyuki (English: Oyuki's Sin alt. The Sin of Oyuki, Japanese: Oyuki (の罪)) was a Mexican comic book series that appeared in the weekly magazine Tears, Laughter and Love, published by EDAR between 1975 and 1977. Was created and written by Yolanda Vargas Dulché. The comic tells the story of Oyuki, a beautiful Japanese woman in love with a young British painter. The plot bears some resemblance to the story Madama Butterfly by John Luther Long (1898), adapted as an opera by Giacomo Puccini in 1904.

The story was adapted in a 1988 telenovela of the same name.

== Story ==
Oyuki is a young, beautiful Japanese peasant who lives with her elderly parents in the Japanese province. She has an older brother named Yutaka, who is evil and vicious. Both Oyuki and her parents live in fear of Yutaka, who constantly mistreats them. The tragedy begins when her parents are killed by Yutaka's enemies as revenge.

Yutaka takes Oyuki to Tokyo. In her childhood, Oyuki learned traditional dances taught by her aunt. Yutaka intends that she uses these dances to exploit her and turn her into a dancer at a ryotei. Soon, Oyuki becomes in a sensation and get to dance in the most important ryotei of Tokyo, where her talent and beauty captivate men. One of those men is Lord Togo Fushoko, a wealthy merchant and one of the richest men in Japan. Yutaka force his sister to accept the marriage proposal of Fushoko. Oyuki suffers abuse from her brother. Her only friend is Sumiko, an orphan girl who Yutaka picked up from the street to keep her company.

One night, Oyuki meets Irving Pointer, a young English painter. Irving immediately falls in love with the beauty of Oyuki. Irving is the son of Sir Charles Pointer, the ambassador of the United Kingdom in Japan. Irving challenged his conservative and domineering mother, Lady Elizabeth, and pursued his dream of being a famous painter. Irving convinces Oyuki to pose for a portrait. Inevitably, Oyuki ends up falling in love with Irving.

Oyuki and Irving begin a secret romance. She knows that her brother Yutaka plans to marry her to Lord Fushoko. Irving knows that his mother will never consent to him marry a woman of a different race. For some reason, Lady Elizabeth feels a deep aversion to everything related to Japan.

One night, Oyuki has an appointment with Lord Fushoko, where she confesses her love to Irving. Fushoko is enraged to discover that he is a Caucasian man and tells Yutaka. Furious and drunk, Yutaka attacks his sister. Sumiko intervenes and is accidentally fatally stabbed by Yutaka. Yutaka disappears, fleeing from justice, but Oyuki refuses to accuse her only brother. However, Oyuki is now free of Yutaka's control.

Irving accelerates his wedding plans with Oyuki. When he confesses his love to his parents, Lady Elizabeth is infuriated and convinces her husband not to support Irving's plans. Irving and Oyuki married in a simple wedding and live together in a small house in a popular neighborhood. Irving tries to get a job as a painter, but secretly, Lady Elizabeth begins to block the Irving's plans with the intention of pressing him to return with her.

Oyuki and Irving live happily accompanied by their best friends, Orson and Elianne, a couple of young journalists. Their happiness grows when Oyuki discovers that she is pregnant. Unfortunately, the Oyuki's neighbors do not look favorably upon her marriage with a white man, believing that she has betrayed her people. Her only Japanese friend is a young girl named Kikusan.

Unfortunately, the intrigues of Lady Elizabeth take effect. Irving loses his job in a Journal and the economic situation of the family is complicated, especially after the birth of their daughter, Yuriko.

Given the difficult situation, Irving overcomes his pride and looking for his father. Sir Charles is a good man and decides to help his son. Irving has an offer to exhibit his paintings in Paris and with the help of his father, he plans to move to Europe with Oyuki and his daughter. But unfortunately, Yuriko gets sick and prevents Oyuki to travel with Irving. Irving promises to return for them when he sell his first picture.

But for reasons of fate, Oyuki begins to be alone. Orson and Elianne also return to Europe. Yuriko contracted scarlet fever and Oyuki spends all her savings in the hospital. Oyuki try to find Sir. Charles, but the ambassador takes a long holiday without his wife.

Oyuki is vulnerable to the machinations of Lady Elizabeth, who begins to block the Oyuki's attempts to locate Irving. Yutaka also reappears supposedly repentant. But Yutaka secretly seeks revenge on her sister and he intends to exploit her again. Irving triumphs in Paris and sends money to his wife, but the correspondence is intercepted by Yutaka. Spend weeks and Oyuki and Yuriko begins to go hungry, surviving on the charity of her neighbors. Desperate, she decides to seek the help of Lady Elizabeth, but her mother in law humiliates her and threatens to steal her daughter. Believing that Irving has abandoned them, and fearful of Lady Elizabeth plans, Oyuki accepts the help of Yutaka and partly to live with him.

Yutaka convinces Oyuki back to dance and convinces her to move with him to Kyoto. Sir Charles returns from his long voyage and discovers his wife's intrigues. He tells the truth to his son. Irving decides to return to Japan to find his wife and daughter. When he discovers the truth, despises his mother. After a few days, Irving gets locate Oyuki in Kyoto. They discover the intrigues of which were victims and decide to move to Paris. But Yutaka discovers them and tries to prevent the escape of her sister. Irving and Yutaka fight. Yutaka takes a gun and shoots at Irving mortally wounding him. Oyuki takes the gun and shoot Yutaka, but he flees and lies to the police accusing her sister of the crime. Irving dies in the arms of Oyuki.

Oyuki is arrested and put on trial. Yutaka and Lady Elizabeth come to the hearing and lie to incriminate Oyuki. Oyuki is accused of murder and sentenced to a sentence of twenty years in prison. Oyuki is forced to give her daughter to her grandparents.

The case shocked the entire Japan. Lord Fushoko learns of the situation and decides to help Oyuki. Fushoko still loves her and promises to find Yutaka and force him to confess his crime. But Yutaka disappears without a trace.

Yuriko begins to live with her grandparents. Lady Elizabeth decides to change the name of the girl. Now she's called Lily, and Lady Elizabeth makes her believe that her mother is dead. When Lily is eleven years old, she is sent to live in a boarding school in Switzerland.

They spend fifteen years since Oyuki was imprisoned. Yutaka has lived a hell and is tormented by the memories. Agonizing, Yutaka decides to confess his crime before he dies. Oyuki is free.

Oyuki decides to look for her daughter at home of her grandparents. Yuriko is now an elegant young educated in Europe who does not remember anything about her mother. Oyuki beseeches Sir Pointer be near of her daughter. She pretends to be a servant named Suzuki. An accident has radically changed the feelings of Lady Elizabeth.

Yuriko has fallen in love. She surprised everyone when she confesses that she loves a Japanese man. He is Takama, the son of Lord Fushoko. Shortly before the wedding, Oyuki decides it is time to confess the truth to her daughter. Yuriko accepts her mother. Lady Elizabeth begs forgiveness Oyuki. Yuriko and Takama get married.

Years pass and Oyuki is now an old woman dedicated to caring for her grandson Irving II. One night, Oyuki dies of natural causes. She is received at the threshold of the afterlife by the spirit of Irving, implying that their souls be united for the eternity.

== Collected editions ==
- The comic book was released in 2006 by Grupo Editorial Vid in a series of special editions called Yolanda Vargas Dulché Collection.

== In other media ==
- In 1988, the Mexican television network Televisa adapted the comic book as a telenovela with the same name. Was produced by Lucy Orozco and starring Mexican actress Ana Martin.

== See also ==
- Rarotonga
- Memín Pinguín
- Lágrimas, Risas y Amor
