= El pecado de Oyuki =

El pecado de Oyuki refers to:

- El pecado de Oyuki (comics), a Mexican comic book series
- El pecado de Oyuki (TV series), a telenovela based on the comics
