= Emoé de la Parra =

Mexican actress and academic

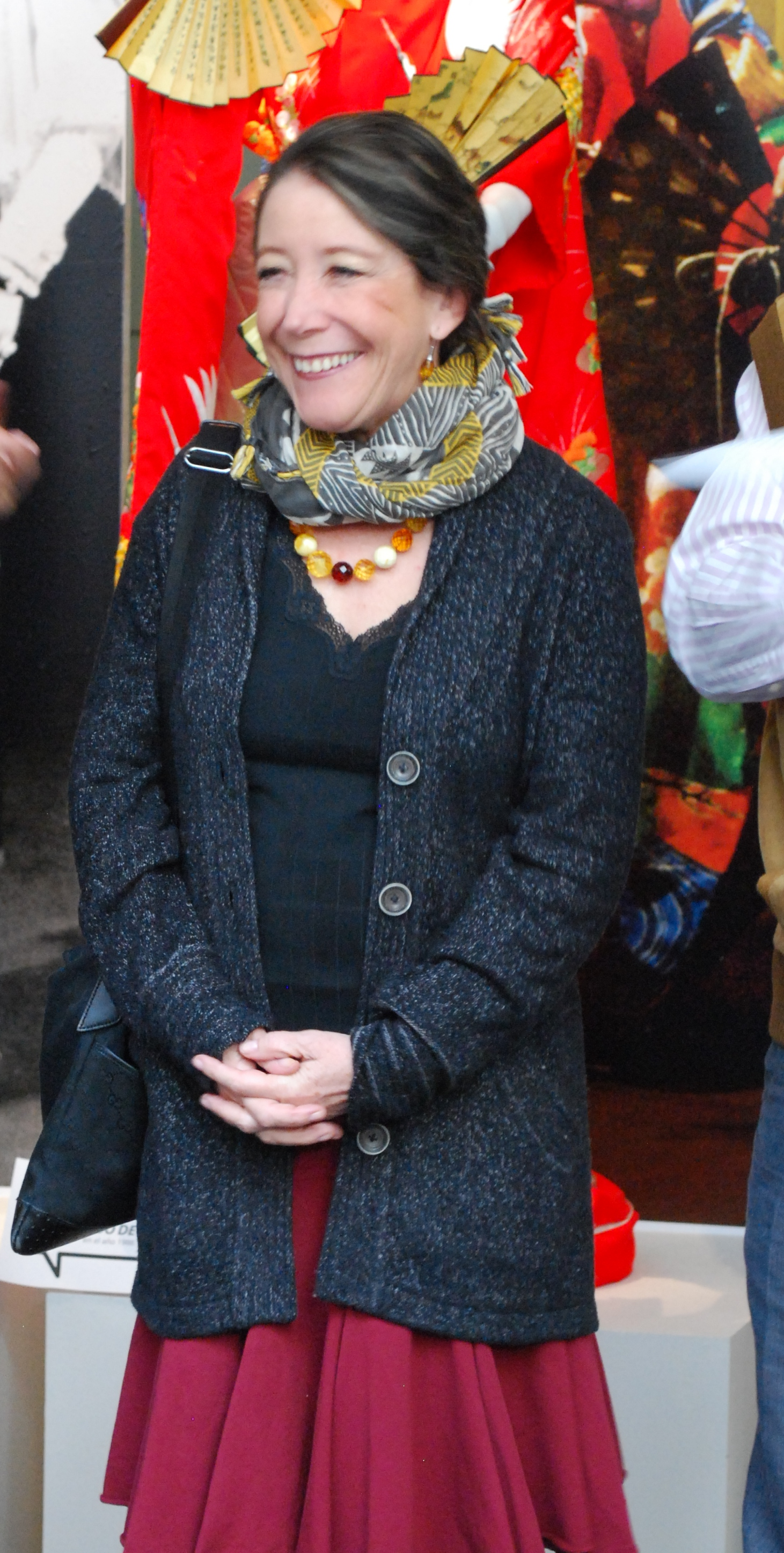
- de la Parra at event to honor her mother at the Museo de Arte Popular
- Born: Emoé de la Parra Vargas; June 16, 1953 (age 72); Mexico City, Mexico
- Occupation: Actress
- Years active: 1970-present
- Parent(s): Yolanda Vargas Dulché; Guillermo de la Parra
- Relatives: Elba de la Parra Vargas (sister); Manelick de la Parra Vargas (brother); Mané de la Parra (nephew); Alondra de la Parra (niece); Armando Vargas de la Maza (grandfather); Josefina Dulché (grandmother)

Emoé de la Parra (born Emoé de la Parra Vargas on June 16, 1953, in Mexico City, Mexico) is a Mexican actress and academic, daughter of Mexican writer Yolanda Vargas Dulché. Most of her acting work has been in the theater but she is better known for her television work, including appearances in works written by her mother such as Encrucijada and Gabriel y Gabriela. Other acting related work has been direction and production of plays, along with screenplay adaptation and translations. Her academic work has been focused on philosophy, mostly with the Universidad Nacional Autónoma de México.

== Life ==
de la Parra was born on June 16, 1955, in Mexico City. Her interest in the theater began when she was a child; however, her formal college degree work focused on philosophy. She graduated from the Universidad Nacional Autónoma de México (UNAM) in 1977 with a degree in philosophy, followed by graduate work in the philosophy of science at the University of Oxford and post graduate studies at Sorbonne University. She received her master's degree in philosophy at UNAM. Her acting studies began in 1969 at UNAM with various classes and workshops including classes taken in Paris and London up through 1989.

She is the daughter of Mexican writer Yolanda Vargas Dulché whose work she has safeguarded since her mother's death in 1999. During the 2005 controversy surrounding Memín Pinguín, when the character was accused of racism by some in the United States, Emoé defended her mother and the character, who she says she considered to be an “older brother.”

In addition to Spanish, she speaks English and French fluently, with competency in German as well.

== Career ==
=== Acting ===
Most of her acting work has been with the theatre with roles in over forty five plays and other theatrical pieces from 1969 to the present. These include Lejos (Far away) by Caryl Churchill (2009), Noche de Ánimas by Oralba Castillo Nájera (2009), Primavera salvaje by Arnold Wesker (2011), Emily by William Luce (2011), First Love by Samuel Beckett (2012), and Requiem by Hanoch Levin (2012) .

Her most important acting roles have been in telenovelas with some appearances in series and documentaries. Her television includes appearances in Encrucijada (telenovela, 1969), Gabriel y Gabriela (telenovela, 1982), Juana Iris (telenovela, 1985), El Humor es una cosa esplendorosa (TV series 1985), Tiempo de Amar (telenovela, 1987), Mujer, casos de la vida real (TV series, 1988, 1991, 1992, 1995), Pasión y Poder (telenovela, 1988), Simplemente María (telenovela, 1989), Don Porfirio (telenovela, 1993), Cosa Juzgada (video theatre, 1994), Alondra (telenovela, 1994), María Isabel (telenovela, 1997–1998), Pasión (telenovela, 2007), Vive (TV series, 2007), Soy tu dueña (telenovela, 2010) .

Other work has included film roles such as Los Justos (1973), Estación Buenavista (1981), Los Hermanos Queridos (1982), Carnaval de Sodoma (2005), Desátame (2011) and Runaway home (2012) . Since 1986 she has been involved in direction and production activities, which have included coproducing Lejos (Far away) (2009), direction and production of Emily (2009), and production of Primavera salvaje (2011) .

Her recognitions include Best amateur actress (1972) from Canal Once, nomination for the Revelación femenina prize of the Asociación de Críticos Mexicanos (1988), the Juan Ruíz de Alarcón Prize, the Salvador Novo Prize and the María Teresa Montoya Prize from La Unión de Críticos y Cronistas de Teatro, A.C.(1994) and the María Douglas Prize (1999). She has adapted various novels and other works for screen including Emily and Primer Amor (with Antonio Algarra), Entre Sombras by Yolanda Vargas Dulché, Variación de “Un cuarto propio” based on a work by Virginia Woolf, Variación de “Molly Bloom” from Ulysses by James Joyce, Rosmersholm by Henrik Ibsen and ¿De verdad cree que la muerte es muy dulce, Madame de Beauvoir? by Simone de Beauvoir as well as several translations of works such as La beldad de Amhurst by William Luce (with Marta Donís), The Lady of Larkspur Lotion by Tennessee Williams (with Gerardo Moscoso) and Mrs. Klein by Nicholas Wright. She cofounded the Laboratorio Teatral Paraíso with Antonio Algarra and Exy Gaistardo. She has written two plays Viñetas teatrales (2005) and El Ángel negro (2007, in progress) .

=== Academia ===
From 1970 to the present she has taught various university level courses in philosophy, logic, history of philosophy at various institutions but primarily at UNAM and the Universidad Autónoma Metropolitana Azcapotzalco. Her academic work has also included participation in various conferences and seminars at UNAM, the Escuela Nacional de Teatro and the University of the Cloister of Sor Juana .
