= Memín Pinguín =

Fictional comic book character

Comic book cover featuring Memín Pingüín and his mother

Memín Pinguín is a Mexican comic book character. He was created in 1943 by writer Yolanda Vargas Dulché. Alberto Cabrera took over drawing from 1953 until 1962, followed by Sixto Valencia Burgos.

The original series had 372 chapters printed in sepia, and it has been republished in 1952 and 1961. In 1988 it was re-edited colorized, and in 2004 was re-edited again. Valencia worked on the reissues over the years, updating the drawings (clothes, settings and backgrounds) for the re-edits. It contains comedy and soap opera elements. However, since 2008 Valencia no longer works on the comic, having departed publishing house Editorial Vid.

In addition to Mexico, Memín remains a popular magazine in the Dominican Republic, Venezuela, Peru, Chile, Panama, Colombia, Nicaragua, and other countries. At its peak, it had a weekly circulation of one and a half million issues in Mexico.

== Characters ==
The stories were partially based on recollection of the childhood adventures of Yolanda Vargas Dulché in the Colonia Guerrero near downtown Mexico City. The character of Memín Pinguín was inspired by Cuban children seen by the author Yolanda Vargas Dulché on her travels. Memín is an alteration of Memo, the shortened form of Guillermo, her husband's name; Pinguín comes from pingo (roughly meaning mischievous, in an affectionate tone).

Memín is a restless boy who is not a very good student, not because of a lack of intelligence, but for not being able to pay attention (he is surprisingly good at arithmetic). He helps his mother working in the street, selling newspapers, and as a shoe shine boy. Memín reflects the life of a poor Mexican boy in Mexico City. Memín and his mother are the only Afro-Mexican characters.

Memín is accompanied in his adventures by a group of three loyal friends:

Carlos "Carlangas" Arozamena
A shrewd curly-haired boy who was abandoned by his rich father and was raised by his working class mother. He likes to solve things with his fists, and rarely shows fear. He's a tough boy with a heart of gold. He is not as intelligent as Ernestillo but he manages to get the best scores in a private school test when he moved to live with his father. He thinks his mother has an honest job until he realizes she worked as a "Fichera" (dancer in night clubs) and got involved in a fight that leaves his mother with a gunshot wound and Carlangas in jail due to almost killing her aggressor. His mother later reconnects with Carlos Arozamena Sr., and while they fail to reconcile they decide to provide Carlangas a better future sending him to live with his father. However, Carlos eventually gets homesick and comes back to his mother's side. Finally his parents got married again, but not until after Carlos Sr. went bankrupt and learned to appreciate the value of true love over the value of material possessions.
Ernesto "Ernestillo" Vargas
The intelligent and hard working one. His mother died when he was young and has since been raised by his father, an alcoholic carpenter. Ernestillo is so poor he has no shoes. Later, with the help of Ricardo and his friends, he has better clothes and helps his father to overcome his alcoholism and an accident that almost left him without a leg. He acts as the voice of reason of the group but sometimes he is not patient enough and gives a "coscorrón" (noogie) to Memín. He is Memín's best friend and was involved in one of Memín's dreams when both go to China.
Ricardo "Riquillo" Arcaraz
A blond rich boy who has traveled around the world. His father decided it would be better for him to attend a public school. A self-made man, he thinks his son was being pampered too much at private schools. At first he had significant troubles fitting in, until some incidents after school led to him bonding with Memín and his friends, to the point of standing up to his mother to defend them . He learns the value of work from Memín, as well as the realities and hardships of life. For a while, he even works as a shoeshine boy with Memín. When his parents tried to get a divorce, he ran away to Guadalajara to live with his godmother, but Memín, who accompanied him, left a note to Eufrosina, leading Ricardo's parents to them.

Other prominent characters as listed:

Eufrosina
She is the hot-tempered but charming mother of Memín that makes a living by taking in washing the clothes of her neighbors. She also likes to cook, specially the "tortas de miel" (bread with honey) that Memín loves to eat. However, when she got angry to Memín punishes him by hitting his butt with a table with a nail attached. Her main stories were concerned to adopt a pretty girl that was abandoned in a park while Memín was playing even the poverty of the family; later she tries to get a job in New York City but not without having Memín lost and then confronting Memín homesick attitude after an unfortunate job in a mansion. A more memorable story puts her sick and with the need of a kidney transplant after suffering because of Memín cheating his notes in school.
Trifon
An obese boy that comes from the North of Mexico. In his first appearance is picked on by Memín because of his obesity to the point to have Memín jumping over his stomach. Later, he got severely ill while Memín decided to not take Communion; however Memín is not able to make Trifon realize he is acting bad even after slapping him in the face. Later, Memín got really repentant when he learns about Trifon's illness and got scared when he did not find him after his Communion, just to know that he is cured. Lately is a prominent character in the Memín's adventure in Monterrey and Texas, because he helps Memín and his friends to get some hospitality from his aunt Canuta. In a later adventure, he dies bringing an uproar among fans and pushing the creator to avoid killing another characters.
Professor Romero
The teacher of Memín's class, he is a very comprehensive teacher while also very strict, going to the extreme to punish Memín sometimes due to his laziness. However, he manages to help his students to help Ernestillo and his father to overcome the alcoholic problems of Ernestillo's father. Some stories later, Memín was punished to study with the lower grade kids and while doing this makes a mischief that pushes the teacher really angry so she went to Professor Romero's classroom to complain about it; however Romero stands for Memín and, in the process, the teachers fell in love and they are married later. During their honeymoon they find Memín's gang lost after they follow a fake treasure map and manages to bring them back to their parents. Later adventures were involved around Memín's incapability to study.

Although Memín is a comedy comic, it resembles soap operas in that the comic's story is a continuous one. Every week, the newest publication of Memín begins where the last publication had left off. In addition, because of the elements involved in the comic magazine's story, such as poverty, parental abandonment, death and alcoholism, often there are dramatic moments in the magazine as well.

Based on the popularity of Memín, Yolanda and her husband Don Guillermo de la Parra were able to found Editorial Vid, a comics publishing company that eventually published hundreds of titles of Mexican comics, some of them written by Yolanda and her husband. Some of these titles also had stories related to black people, such as "Rarotonga", "Majestad Negra", and "Carne de Ébano", but only Memín was set in Mexico.

== Racial issues ==
While Memín suffers a degree of racist taunting, especially in the first issues, the characters mocking him are depicted as either cruel or ignorant. As the story progresses, his race becomes less of an issue.

In an earlier story, Memín and his friends go to Ricardo's house after the then spoiled kid decides to make them to take a bath because of a mud fight they were involved. While bathing Memín forgets a soap bar and walked outside the bathroom without caring to dress, just to walk in front of Ricardo's mother that, scared, began to scream that a chimp was in her house, Memín, not catching the offense, really thinks that there is a chimp in the house and both began running scared, the woman from Memín, himself from the supposed chimp.

In one famous issue, Memín, having read that Cleopatra VII of Egypt took milk baths to lighten her skin, tries the same treatment. His mother weeps with sorrow that her son would want to change his skin color. A repentant Memín decides to be proud of his race and color to honor his good mother.

In another, Memín decides not to receive Communion at his church, after a cruel boy tells him blacks are not allowed in Heaven, pointing to the lack of black angels in religious paintings as proof (this was inspired by a popular song "Angelitos negros" that asked the same question and a popular Mexican motion picture of 1948 of the same name). Memín reasons that, since he is going to Hell anyway, he can get away with any mischief he wants. This prompted some Roman Catholic priests to boycott the magazine. After sales plummeted in response to the boycott, an issue was published in which Memín's friends, with the aid of the church priest, paint one of the angels in the church black; Memín returns to church and dreams of becoming an angel.

In yet another adventure called "Líos Gordos" Memín and his friends travel to Texas to play soccer. They go for a chocolate milkshake, but the place refuses service to Memín, because it doesn't serve "Negroes". His friends stand up for him, get into a fight, and end up in jail.

In a later adventure, Memín and Eufrosina decide to work in New York City but Memín gets lost in the process and begins working for a Mexican family where a blind girl begins to bring affection to her new employee. She thinks that he is blond and white because of his cheerful attitude (inspired by Marianela from Benito Perez Galdos). Later, Memín meets her cousin, a spoiled kid who he begins to have some fights. Finally, the girl is cured of her condition, but Memín, scared to be seen by the girl, decides to retire from the house while the girl misses her cousin with Memín. Some days later, she frees Memín and his mother from jail and reveals that she learned about the truth and explains all the masquerade to Eufrosina's dismay.

Finally, Memín and his friends went along a millionaire to Africa, where the most racial details were put in hot place, first Memín got a motherly friendship with a female gorilla, that later tends to be very useful for the kids to save the millionaire to be killed by his ambitious son. Later, they got trapped by cannibals that thought that Memín is a gift from the gods because of his bald condition and they named him King, just to be captured by slave traders (that freed Memín's friends in the process) and, while Memín was suffering in the ship, his friends finally freed him not without having a very angry Memín punching everyone (including his friends) due to their bad attitude over black people.

== Memín in popular culture ==
As a result of the character's fame, Memín has appeared in other magazines. In 1965, he gave a lengthy interview for the magazine Contenido, where he appeared in a tuxedo. In addition, he was considered one of the most famous members of the Mexican Scout Association, and included in the cover of their magazine in June 1995 to coincide with the publication of the "History of Mexican Comics" stamps by the Mexican Postal Service.

== Controversy ==
Memín was criticized on its first runs (1960–1970), but the critics were more concerned with his popularity, since intellectuals of that time had a very low opinion of comics in general. The average age of the comic reader in Mexico was higher than in the United States, about 18 instead of 13, so some argue the content of comics had a very strong influence on Mexican society. Memín was read mostly by poor and middle-class Mexicans. Some of the critics touch upon the racial aspects, but this topic was mostly ignored. Critics were more concerned with the stereotypical treatment of certain social themes and the values the stories typically reflect, which more or less echo the ideals of a Catholic middle class. Yolanda was very sensitive to critics, since they reflect heavily on sales. As Harold Hinds comments in his book Not just for children, the study of these comics is important to understand Mexican society.

In June 2005, as part of a "History of Mexican Comics" series, the Mexican Postal Service (SEPOMEX) issued a series of postage stamps featuring the character of Memín. The stamps were deemed offensive by a number of African American community groups and politicians in the United States, including Jesse Jackson, prompting the Mexican government to assert that Memín had done a lot to oppose racism and that the stereotypical Warner Brothers' character Speedy Gonzales was never interpreted as offensive in Mexico. LULAC and NCLR, Hispanic Americans civil rights organizations, also issued statements calling the stamps racist.

The charges of racism stem from the manner in which Pinguín and his mother are rendered, in the style of "darky iconography" (a form which, in the United States, has its roots in blackface and the American minstrel show tradition.) Early Mexican comic artists adopted this mode of depicting people of African descent which had become commonplace around the world. Memín and his mother are depicted stereotypically as the "pickaninny" and the "mammy", respectively. The dress and attitudes of Memín's mother are a caricature of Afro-Cuban women of the time and mirror Afrodiasporic clothing in various Latin American countries.

Mexican Minister of Foreign Affairs Luis Ernesto Derbez declared to the press that "it is a total lack of knowledge of our culture; it looks to me that it is a total lack of respect to our culture that some people are making an issue out of this which does not resemble the reality."

According to Mexican author Enrique Krauze, the difference of reactions to Memín Pinguín in the United States and Mexico stem from each nations history. Krauze claimed that due to American history being more fraught with racism than Mexico, including racist legislation such as the Jim Crow laws, Americans will perceive things in a far more racialized manner than Mexicans. He elaborated on this point by saying that although Mexico had racial issues of its own, acts such as the earlier abolition of slavery in Mexico caused Mexicans to view the comics from a less racialized perspective than the American populace.

The criticism from United States officials was not only ridiculed by public opinion leaders in Mexico and by most of the Mexican population, but it also spurred interest in the stamps: from the day they were criticized, they were offered in Internet auction sites for several times their face value, and Mexican collectors bought the full edition of 750,000 copies in a few days. Sales of the magazine increased, and the publisher decided to relaunch the series from the first issue alongside the current printing. Mexican intellectuals both from right and left have denounced this criticism as an attack on Mexico, and political magazines like Proceso have questioned the chain of events that led to the criticism, making this criticism, a political issue against México.

In 2008, after complaints from an African-American shopper regarding what one news organization reported to be Memín's simian-like appearance and his "Aunt Jemima-like mother," all Memín periodicals were pulled from Wal-Mart stores in Texas. This came after the latest issue titled "Memín para presidente" ("Memín for President") was being sold at locations with a large Hispanic population.

== See also ==
- Afro-Mexicans
- Blackface
- Comics in Mexico
- Rarotonga
- María Isabel
- Rubí
- Yesenia
- Gabriel y Gabriela
- Alondra
- El pecado de Oyuki
