= Ruby (2012 TV series) =

- Created by: Yolanda Vargas Dulché; Ximena Suárez; Virginia Quintana
- Based on: Rubí by Benjamín Cann and Eric Morales
- Written by: Claudia Marchelian and Araceli Guajardo
- Directed by: Rami Hanna
- Starring: Cyrine Abdelnour
- Countries of origin: Lebanon; Egypt
- Original language: Arabic

Production
- Running time: 48 minutes
- Production company: Televisa

Ruby is an Arab dramatic series and a remake of the 2004 Mexican version produced by Televisa and written by Yolanda Vargas Dulche. It was produced in 2012 and aired on MBC 1 and Lebanese Broadcasting Corporation.

== Plot ==
Ruby is a young, ambitious Lebanese woman who falls in love with a Syrian doctor but marries his Egyptian friend who is also her friend's fiancé. Ruby left her Syrian boyfriend simply because his Egyptian friend was a millionaire, and she fell for his money. Therefore, she breaks both her friend's heart and that of her lover. And then she undergoes the consequences of her mistake by committing a series other mistakes. When married to the millionaire, she makes his life miserable. At the end, he takes his revenge on her and makes her return poorer than she originally was.

== Cast ==
- Cyrine Abdelnour - Ruby
- Maxim Khalil - Omar
- Diamant Bou Abboud - Shereen
- Amir Karara - Tamer
- Takla Chamoun - Aliya
- Pierrette Katrib - Racha
- Janah Fakhoury - Em Abdo
- Nada Abou Farhat - Nagham
- Fady Ibrahim - Adib
- Chady Haddad - Achraf
- Khitam Ellaham - Wardeh
- Ezzat Abou Aouf - Riad
- Zaki Fatin Abdel Wahab - Fathi
- Hanane Youssef - Nabila
- Cynthia Khalifeh - Ghada
- Assaad Hattab - Karim
- Tarek Annich - Mazen
- Dina El Sherbiny - Sara
- Dori Al samarani - Samer
- Marinelle Sarkis - Em Omar
- Nicolas Mouawad - Fadi
- Nada Remy - Elissar
- Liza Debs - Maya
- Carla Boutros - Dalal
- Yusif Fawzi - Farouk
- Randa Kaady - Dounia
- Jihad Al Andari

== See also ==
- List of Egyptian television series
- List of Lebanese television series
