= Rubí (2020 TV series) =

Spanish-language drama television series

- Genre: Drama
- Created by: Leonardo Padrón
- Based on: Rubí by Yolanda Vargas Dulché
- Screenplay by: Vicente Albarracín; Carlos Eloy Castro; Karla de la Peña
- Directed by: Carlos Cock Marín; Pepe Castro; Pavel Vázquez
- Starring: Camila Sodi; José Ron; Rodrigo Guirao; Kimberly Dos Ramos; Ela Velden; Tania Lizardo; Marcus Ornellas; Lisardo; Alejandra Espinoza; María Fernanda García; Henry Zakka; Rubén Sanz; Alfredo Gatica; Giuseppe Gamba; Valery Saís; Antonio Fortier; Paola Toyos; Mayrín Villanueva
- Theme music composer: Ignacio Canut; Carlos García Berlanga
- Opening theme: "¿A quién le importa?" by Camila Sodi
- Country of origin: United States
- Original language: Spanish
- No. of seasons: 1
- No. of episodes: 26

Production
- Executive producer: Carlos Bardasano
- Producers: Juan Carlos Moguel; Jorge Sastoque Roa
- Editor: Fermín Branger
- Camera setup: Multi-camera
- Production companies: Televisa; W Studios

Original release
- Network: Univision
- Release: 21 January – 27 February 2020

Related
- Rubí (1968)

Rubí is a Spanish-language television series written by Leonardo Padrón and produced by W Studios for Televisa and Univision. It is a reboot of the 2004 Mexican telenovela of the same name, and the third production of the Fábrica de sueños franchise. The series premiered in the United States on 21 January 2020 on Univision, and concluded on 27 February 2020 with a total of 26 episodes. It stars Camila Sodi as the title character.

== Premise ==
The narrative follows Carla, a young journalist who persuades Rubí, a reclusive woman residing in a secluded mansion, to recount her life story and explain her decision to self-isolate. Through her account, it is revealed that Rubí was an ambitious woman from a modest background who used her physical appearance and charm to escape poverty and attain prestige, regardless of the impact on those around her.

== Cast ==
The cast and characters were revealed by People en Español magazine in September 2019 and January 2020 respectively.

=== Main ===
- Camila Sodi as Rubi Perez Ochoa, she is an ambitious woman who uses her beauty to obtain benefits. And Hector Ferrer's former wife.
- José Ron as Alejandro Cardenas, he is a cardiologist and Rubí's first love.
- Rodrigo Guirao as Hector Ferrer Garza, he is a famous architect, former fiancé of Maribel and later Rubí's husband.
- Kimberly Dos Ramos as Maribel de la Fuente, she is Rubí's former best friend and Hector's ex-fiancé
- Ela Velden as Carla Rangel / Fernanda Perez Ochoa, she is a journalist and Rubi's niece who years later grows up and pretends to be Carla Rangel in order to obtain information from her aunt.
  - Valery Saís as Child Fernanda
- Tania Lizardo as Cristina Perez Ochoa, Rubi's sister.
- Marcus Ornellas as Lucas Fuentes Morab he is a famous clothing designer who becomes obsessed with the beauty of Rubi
- Lisardo as Arturo de la Fuente, Maribel's father.
- Alejandra Espinoza as Sonia Aristimuno, Alejandro's ex-fiancé
- María Fernanda García as Rosa Ortiz de la Fuente, Maribel's mother.
- Henry Zakka as Boris, Rubí's bodyguard.
- Rubén Sanz as Prince Eduardo of Spain
- Alfredo Gatica as Loreto Mata, Rubi's best friend.
- Giuseppe Gamba as Napoleon, Alejandro's best friend.
- Antonio Fortier as Cayetano Gómez, he is Arturo's driver and Cristina's boyfriend.
- Paola Toyos as Queca Gallardo, she is a famous blogger who writes scandals about the lives of famous entrepreneurs.
- Mayrín Villanueva as Refugio Ochoa de Perez, Rubi and Cristina's mother.

=== Guest stars ===
- Gerardo Murguía as Dr. Mandieta, he is the director of the private university where Rubi studied.
- Juan Soler as Hector Ferrer Garza, Hector's father.

== Production ==
In July 2019, W Studios and Lemon Films began development on a new remake of the 2004 Mexican drama Rubí with Carlos Bardasano as producer. Previously in May 2019 Bardasano confirmed that the adaptation would be both a remake and a sequel and clarifying that: "The story will not only address those aspects known to the public, but will explore what happened to the character years after." The filming of the series officially began on 20 July 2019, and concluded at the beginning of October 2019 in Madrid, Spain. The main theme song of the series is "¿A quién le importa?", is performed by Sodi, whose aunt, Thalía, had covered years prior.

== Reception ==
The series received mixed reviews from audiences. Sodi's performance was compared to that of Bárbara Mori in the 2004 adaptation. It premiered on 21 January 2020 in the United States, attracting 1.66 million total viewers (P2+) and had a total of 749,000 adults aged 18–49, marking the best debut for a Univision fiction at 10 p.m. since 2017. The series achieved favorable ratings compared with its competition, El Señor de los Cielos.

== Ratings ==
=== U.S. ratings ===
Viewership and ratings per season of Rubí
Season	Timeslot (ET)	Episodes	First aired		Last aired		Avg. viewers (millions)
Season	Timeslot (ET)	Episodes	Date	Viewers (millions)	Date	Viewers (millions)	Avg. viewers (millions)
1	Mon–Fri 10pm/9c	26	21 January 2020	1.66	27 February 2020	1.99	1.55

=== Mexico ratings ===
Viewership and ratings per season of Rubí
Season	Timeslot (CT)	Episodes	First aired		Last aired		Avg. viewers (millions)
Season	Timeslot (CT)	Episodes	Date	Viewers (millions)	Date	Viewers (millions)	Avg. viewers (millions)
1	Mon–Fri 9:30pm	27	15 June 2020	3.6	21 July 2020	4.8	3.74

== Episodes ==
No.	Title	Original release date	U.S. viewers (millions)
1	"El primer encuentro"	21 January 2020	1.66
2	"Noticia inesperada"	22 January 2020	1.52
3	"Hombre equivocado"	23 January 2020	1.48
4	"El hombre rico"	24 January 2020	1.40
5	"El peor amigo"	27 January 2020	1.54
6	"Celos incontrolables"	28 January 2020	1.52
7	"Amante descarado"	29 January 2020	1.48
8	"Esposo peligroso"	30 January 2020	1.45
9	"Nuevo comienzo"	31 January 2020	1.21
10	"Falsas disculpas"	3 February 2020	1.65
11	"Ataque inesperado"	5 February 2020	1.44
12	"La trampa perfecta"	6 February 2020	1.47
13	"Traición peligrosa"	7 February 2020	1.48
14	"Desaparecida"	10 February 2020	1.61
15	"La peor mujer"	11 February 2020	1.51
16	"Paternidad"	12 February 2020	1.51
17	"Nueva familia"	13 February 2020	1.59
18	"Noticia impactante"	14 February 2020	1.48
19	"Video prohibido"	17 February 2020	1.59
20	"Triste adiós"	18 February 2020	1.61
21	"La nueva viuda"	19 February 2020	1.50
22	"Sin herencia"	21 February 2020	1.66
23	"Rechazada"	24 February 2020	1.65
24	"Amor inesperado"	25 February 2020	1.65
25	"Atrapados"	26 February 2020	1.66
26	"Viejos amigos"	27 February 2020	1.99

=== Special ===
Title	Original release date	U.S. viewers (millions)
"Rubí: El after show"	27 February 2020	1.46
