= DKDA: Sueños de juventud =

Mexican television series

- Genre: Telenovela
- Written by: Susan Crowley; Sergio Schmucler; Carmen Sepúlveda
- Directed by: Benjamín Cann; Manolo García
- Creative director: Juan José Urbini
- Starring: María Sorté; Otto Sirgo; Eugenia Cauduro; Nora Salinas; Luis Gatica
- Theme music composer: Marco Flores; Gerardo Flores
- Opening theme: "Ámame como soy" performed by DKDA
- Country of origin: Mexico
- Original language: Spanish
- No. of episodes: 115

Production
- Executive producer: Luis de Llano Macedo
- Producers: Marco Flavio Cruz; Claudia D'Agostino; Antonino Munguía
- Cinematography: Rubén Barajas; Juan José Cruz
- Editor: Alfredo Sánchez
- Camera setup: Multi-camera
- Production company: Televisa

Original release
- Network: Canal de las Estrellas
- Release: November 22, 1999 – April 28, 2000

DKDA: Sueños de juventud (English: DKDA: Youth dreams) is a Mexican juvenile telenovela produced by Luis de Llano Macedo for Televisa in 1999.

On Monday, November 22, 1999, Canal de las Estrellas started broadcasting DKDA: Sueños de juventud weekdays at 7:00 pm, replacing Alma rebelde. The last episode was broadcast on Friday, April 28, 2000, with Locura de amor replacing it the following Monday.

Jan and Litzy (who later is replaced by Andrea Torre) starred as protagonists, María Sorté, Otto Sirgo and Eugenia Cauduro starred as adult protagonists, while Nora Salinas, Luis Gatica, Alessandra Rosaldo and José Suárez starred as antagonists.

== Cast ==
- María Sorté as Rita Martínez
- Otto Sirgo as Eduardo Arias
- Eugenia Cauduro as Angela Rey de Arias/Kara Giacometti
- Nora Salinas as Leticia del Rosal
- Luis Gatica as Raúl Arias
- Jan as Rodrigo Arias
- Litzy as Laura Martínez #1
- Andrea Torre as Laura Martínez #2
- Alessandra Rosaldo as Brenda Sakal
- Patricio Borghetti as Axel Harris
- Ernesto D'Alessio as Mateo D'Avila
- Verónica Jaspeado as Camila Saldívar
- Paola Cantú as Regina Salas
- Sharis Cid as Karla Rincón
- José Suárez as Paolo Martínez
- Macaria as Prudencia Rincón
- Luis Ernesto Cano as Tino Ventura
- Orlando Miguel as Jerónimo Gutiérrez Rivera
- Cecilia Toussaint as Lola Saldivar
- Mauricio Barcelata as Andrés Sánchez
- Pepe Suarez as Pablo
- Riccardo Dalmacci as Néstor Giacometti
- Archie Lanfranco as Iván
- Lourdes Munguía as Luisa Insuaín
- Luis Gimeno as Jorge Rey
- Yessica Salazar as Christi Borgoña
- Ilan Arditti as Patricio
- Maki as Sandra
- Michel Brown as David
- Milton Cortez as Ramón
- José Luis Cordero "Pocholo" as Librado
- Marco Uriel as Fernando Insuaín
- Esther Rinaldi as Sofía
- Jacqueline Voltaire as Jackie
- Amparo Arozamena as Carmelita
- Arsenio Campos as Felipe
- Sergio Sánchez as Sergio
- Cecilia Gutiérrez as Perla
- Olivia Robles as Chantal
- Alfredo Adame as Plomero
- Dulce María as Mary Cejitas
- Mauricio Islas as himself/host
- Ivonne Montero as herself
- Adal Ramones as himself
- Innis as himself
- Adolfo Angel as himself
- Gustavo Angel as himself
- Aitor Iturrioz as himself
- Ramiro Torres as Host Mirim/Rodrigo Arias (child)
- Fátima Torre as Karla Rincón (child)
- Constanza Mier as Camila Saldivar (child)
- Gisella Aboumrad as Bergoña Rodríguez
- Alan Ledesma as Joaquin
- Martha Cristiana as Hostess
- Mónica Panini as Attendant at airport/Officer of justice
- Marlene Favela as Gina
- Niurka Marcos as Perla
- Yuliana Peniche as Jessica

== Soundtrack ==
DKDA: Sueños de juventud

Soundtrack album by Various artists
- Released: 2000
- Genre: Pop
- Length: 56:11
- Label: EMI Music México

Singles from DKDA: Sueños de juventud
- 1. "Ámame Como Soy (Radio Edit)" Released: 1999

No.	Title	Writer(s)	Length
1.	"Ámame Como Soy" (DKDA)	Gerardo Flores, Marco Flores	5:35
2.	"No Me Limites" (DKDA)	Gerardo Flores, Marco Flores	3:21
3.	"La Fuerza Del Amor" (Jan, Alessandra Rosaldo, Ernesto D'Alessio)	Jorge Nazar	3:31
4.	"Momento" (Alessandra Rosaldo)	Concetta Costanzo	4:04
5.	"No Se Me Pega la Gana" (Patricio Borghetti)	Gerardo Flores, Marco Flores	3:24
6.	"Creer En Ti" (Jan, Patricio Borghetti, Verónica Jaspeado, Ernesto D'Alessio)	Jorge Amaro	3:27
7.	"El Uno Para El Otro" (Ernesto D'Alessio)	Gerardo Flores, Marco Flores	3:30
8.	"Llega La Vida" (Litzy)	Marco Flores	3:37
9.	"DKDA" (Jan, Alessandra Rosaldo, Ernesto D'Alessio)	Gerardo Flores, Marco Flores	3:39
10.	"Jóvenes Como Tú" (Alessandra Rosaldo)	Gerardo Flores	3:48
11.	"Agridulce Amor" (Jan)	Gerardo Flores, Marco Flores	3:13
12.	"Pólvora Mojada" (Verónica Jaspeado)	Manuel Colmenero	3:54
13.	"Creo En Tu Amor" (Jan)	Gerardo Flores, Marco Flores	2:47
14.	"Caminando Entre Nubes" (Paola Cantú)	Gerardo Flores, Marco Flores	3:31
15.	"Soy Tuya" (Litzy)	Concetta Costanzo	4:43

== Awards ==
Year	Award	Category	Nominee	Result
2000	18th TVyNovelas Awards	Best Debut of the Year	Alessandra Rosaldo	Won
2000	18th TVyNovelas Awards	Best Debut of the Year	Jan	Nominated
2000	18th TVyNovelas Awards	Best Debut of the Year	Litzy	Nominated
