= Navidad sin fin =

Mexican telenovela

- Directed by: Alfredo Gurrola
- Starring: Delia De la Cruz Delgado; Gustavo Cárdenas Ávila; Alejandra Barros; Ignacio Lopez Tarso
- Opening theme: "Navidad sin fin" by Alumnos del CEA
- Country of origin: Mexico
- Original language: Spanish
- No. of seasons: 1
- No. of episodes: 16

Production
- Executive producer: Rimas Maliauskas

Original release
- Network: Canal de las Estrellas
- Release: December 17, 2001 – January 5, 2002

Navidad sin fin is a Mexican telenovela produced by Eugenio Cobo for Televisa in 2001. This was the last Christmas telenovela that Televisa produced.

== Plot ==
Has 3 different stories intertwined by the 3 important events at Christmas: Christmas Eve, new year and the arrival of the Kings Magi; they are lives that coincide and must unite to rescue family Christmas values.

== Cast ==
- Delia Beatriz De la Cruz Delgado as Angelita
- Gustavo Cárdenas Ávila as Rodito
- Alejandra Barros as Angelita
- Ignacio Lopez Tarso as Rodito
- Nancy Patiño as Angelita
- Andrés Garza as Rodito
- Sara Cobo as Marisela
- Fernando Colunga as Pedro Montes
- Ana Martín as Teófila
- Alejandra Procuna as Julieta Moreno
- Silvia Mariscal as Doña Isabel
- Raúl Magaña as Mauricio
- Blanca Sánchez as Matilde de Solares
- Nora Salinas as Alejandra
- Elizabeth Álvarez as Yolanda
- Rosa María Bianchi as Josefina
- Yadhira Carrillo as Toñita
- Marlene Favela as Cuquis Ibarra

== See also ==
- List of Christmas films
