= Gustavo Cárdenas Ávila =

JAN CARDENAS
- Also known as: Jan
- Born: April 30, 1974 (age 52); Celaya, Guanajuato, Mexico
- Occupations: Singer, actor, host
- Years active: 1997-present
- Website: www.jan.com.mx

'Jan, (Gustavo Cardenas Avila) (born April 30, 1974 in Celaya, Guanajuato, Mexico) is a Mexican musician, actor, and television host. He had success as a pop-ballad singer in the 1990s and later became a screen and stage actor.

== Personal life ==
Avila was born in Celaya, Guanajuato on April 30, 1974. He is the son of Gustavo Cardenas and Aurora Avila, and has an older sister named Aurora.

At the age of 18, Ávila studied abroad for a year in Macon, Missouri to finish high school. During this time, he played drums and percussion in a Jazz band.

Avila was briefly married to model and beauty pageant titleholder Alejandra Quintero from 2002 to 2003.

Avila has two children, Eugenia and Diego. In 2024, his passion is photography.

== Career ==
=== Music ===
Upon returning to Mexico, Avila joined a pop music group called Sombras, first as a drummer and then as a vocalist. After several years of playing in different cities, Sombras was recruited to perform for the weekly television show Siempre en Domingo. This led to Avila being discovered by Raul Velasco, being signed with Polygram Discos, and releasing his first self-titled album in 1997, "Jan." The album contained the pop-ballad Chiara, which became a strong hit in the same year on the charts in Ibero-America, which despite not having a music video, was played on Siempre en Domingo for an international audience. The song talks about a loved one who died due to terminal disease. The album gained success in Central and South America, as well as Mexico, and led to Avila acting in telenovelas.

For his second album, Acaríciame el alma (1999), Avila worked with Alberto Estebanez in Spain and with Carlos Lara in Los Angeles. His success in telenovelas helped promote this album.

In 2002, Avila released his third album, Y Te Vas, produced by Christian de Walden in Los Angeles, CA.

His fourth album, in 2008, Tierno was created with EMI Televisa Music.

=== Television ===
Soon after his first album, in 1998, Avila was given the opportunity to act and perform in the soap opera Soñadoras. He would go on to successfully act in many other telenovelas and television shows, including DKDA, Mi destino eres tu, La Intrusa, Navidad sin fin, Niña amada mía, Amarte es mi Pecado, Rubí, Apuesta por un amor, Alborada, Peregrina, and Heridas de amor. In 2007, he acted in the telenovela Destilando Amor alongside Eduardo Yáñez, Angélica Rivera and Sergio Sendel.

=== Hosting ===
Avila participated as host for reality shows, pageants, and game shows including Univision, as well as Desfile de las Rosas 2001, Liverpool Fashion Fest (2012), A Comer con Coca Cola (2009-2011), Nuestra Belleza Mexico, Primer Festival del Mariachi, Premios Juventud 2007, among others. He has also made several appearances on Premio Lo Nuestro. And with Televisa he hosted Celebremos Mexico: hecho en mexico.

=== Modeling and advertising ===
Avila has been involved in several advertising campaigns, like for Relojes Rado, Campana para Maseca USA, Joyerías Bizzarro, and Telefonía Celular, and Coca Cola de México.

== Discography ==
- Tierno: Para Siempre (2012) (EMI Televisa Music)
- Tierno (2008) (EMI Televisa Music)
- Y Te Vas (2002)
- Acaríciame el Alma (1999) (Universal Music)
- Jan (1997) (Sony Music)

== Television ==
- Corazón Indomable (2013)
- Como dice el dicho (2012) as Ponce
- Rafaela (2011) as Rene Echeverria
- Destilando amor (2007) as Patricio Iturbe
- Heridas de amor (2006) as Luciano Sartori
- Alborada (2005) as Santiago de Corsa
- Peregrina (2005) as Él mismo
- Apuesta por un amor (2004) as Dr. Felipe Calzada
- Rubí (2004) as Marco
- Amarte es mi pecado (2004) as Roberto Peña
- Niña amada mía (2003) as Mauricio Barocio
- Amigas y rivales (2001) as Julio
- Navidad sin fin (2001) (mini) as Rodito
- La intrusa (2001) as Johnny
- Mi destino eres tú (2000) as Fernando Rivadeniera del Encino
- DKDA: Sueños de juventud (1999-2000) as Rodrigo Arias
- Soñadoras (1998-1999) as Gerardo Rinalde

== Awards and nominations ==
- Received the Latin Emmy Award as a host of the Desfile de las Rosas in Pasadena, California
- Received the Disco De Platino for his work with the band on the telenovela DKDA
- In 2004, he won the TVyNovelas award for Best New Actor in Amarte es mi pecado
