= Mané de la Parra =

Mexican singer and actor

Mane de la Parra
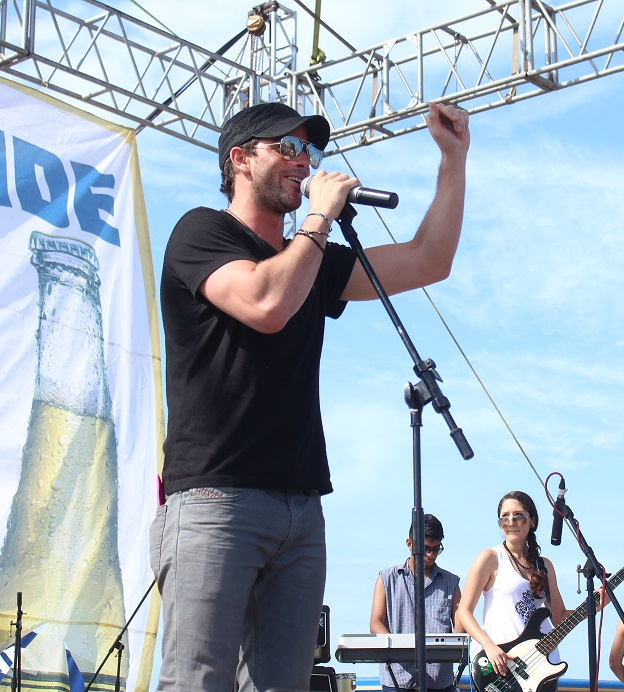
- Mane de la Parra in 2014.
- Born: Manelick de la Parra Borja; 23 December 1982 (age 43); Mexico City, Mexico
- Occupations: Singer, Actor
- Years active: 2009–present
- Spouse: Ligia Uriarte (2025)
- Partner: Maite Perroni (2010-2012)
- Relatives: Alondra de la Parra (sister); Manelik de la Parra Vargas (father); Yolanda Vargas Dulché (grandmother); Guillermo de la Parra (grandfather); Emoé de la Parra (aunt)

Mane de la Parra, also known as Mane, (born Manelick de la Parra Borja; December 23, 1982 in Mexico City, Mexico) is a Mexican singer and actor.

== Biography ==
De la Parra is the grandson of Mexican writer Yolanda Vargas Dulché. He studied at Berklee College of Music in Boston. He further took classes in flamenco guitar in Barcelona with Manuel Granados.

== Music career ==
Mane is now collaborating with a number of people who are supporting his first solo album. Others involved in this album were : Zurdo Alegibe and Freddy Valeriani.

== Songs ==
- Estar Sin Ti {eng. Being without you}, song, Soundtrack Verano de Amor
- Quiero que sepas {eng. I want you to know}, song, Soundtrack Verano de Amor
- Quisiera {eng. I wish}, song, Soundtrack Verano de Amor
- No vaya a ser {eng. It won't be}, song, Soundtrack Verano de Amor
- No puedes ser real {eng. You can't be real}, song, Soundtrack Verano de Amor
- Estrella mia {eng. My star}, song, Soundtrack Verano de Amor
- Es Mentira (eng. It's a lie)
- La Formula {eng. The Formula}
- Siente {eng. I Feel}
- No vas a olvidar {eng. You won't forget}
- Hoy voy a amarte {eng. I'm going to love you today}
- Yo solo quiero saber {eng. I only want to know}
- Esperanza del corazon {eng. Hope of the Heart}, song, Soundtrack Esperanza del Corazon
- Mi respiracion {eng. My Breath}, song, Soundtrack Esperanza del Corazon
- Te tuve y te perdi
- Como soy
- "Es una locura"(featuring. Emilio Osorio), song, Soundtrack ¿Qué le pasa a mi familia?

== Filmography ==
=== Film ===
Year	Title	Role	Notes
2012	El cielo en tu mirada	José Pereyra	Debut film
2016	Juan Apóstol, el más amado	John the Apostle	

=== Television ===
Year	Title	Role	Notes
2009	Verano de amor	Bruno	Television debut
2010	Niña de mi corazón	Charly	Supporting role
2011	Como dice el dicho	Eduardo "Lalo"	"Tanto peca el que mata la vaca" (Season 1, Episode 2)
2011-2012	Esperanza del corazón	Alexis Duarte Moreno	Young protagonist; 145 episodes
2012	Cachito de cielo	Adrián "Cachito" Gómez Obregón	"Un pequeño error" (Season 1, Episode 1); "Cerca de Renata" (Season 1, Episode 3); "Un milagro" (Season 1, Episode 5)
2012-2023	Corona de lágrimas	Ignacio Chavero	Co-lead role; 111 episodes
2014	La malquerida	Ulises Torres Gallardo	Co-lead role; 106 episodes
2015	Nuestra Belleza Latina 2015	Himself	Celebrity guest (7th Gala)
2015	Amor de barrio	Daniel Márquez	Lead role
2017	El vuelo de la victoria	Andrés	Lead role
2019	La reina soy yo	Juanjo	Co-lead role
2021	¿Qué le pasa a mi familia?	Patricio Iturbide Casanova	Lead role
2023	Esta historia me suena	Fausto	Episode: "Me gusta"
2023	Tal para cual	Memo	Episode: "El cantante en bruto"
2024	Mi amor sin tiempo	Daniel	Lead role
2026	Tan cerca de ti, nace el amor	Luis Miranda Salas	Guest star
2026	El precio de la fama	Santiago Urrutia	Main cast

== Awards and nominations ==
=== TVyNovelas Awards ===
Year	Category	Telenovela	Result
2012	Best Male Revelation	Esperanza del Corazón	Nominated
