= Ángela (TV series) =

- Genre: Telenovela; Romance; Drama
- Created by: Cuauhtémoc Blanco; María del Carmen Peña
- Written by: Cuauhtémoc Blanco; María del Carmen Peña; Begoña Fernández; Ricardo Fiallega
- Directed by: Roberto Gómez; Salvador Sánchez
- Starring: Angélica Rivera; Juan Soler
- Theme music composer: Kike Santander
- Opening theme: "Alguna vez" by Cristian Castro
- Ending theme: "Alguna vez" by Cristian Castro
- Country of origin: Mexico
- Original language: Spanish
- No. of episodes: 78

Production
- Executive producer: José Alberto Castro
- Producer: Fausto Sáinz
- Production locations: Filming; Televisa San Ángel; Mexico City, Mexico; El Rosario, Veracruz, Mexico; San Miguel de Allende, Guanajuato, Mexico
- Cinematography: Roberto Gómez; Ernesto Arreola
- Camera setup: Multi-camera
- Running time: 41-44 minutes
- Production company: Televisa

Original release
- Network: Canal de las Estrellas
- Release: November 30, 1998 – March 19, 1999

Ángela is a Mexican telenovela produced by José Alberto Castro for Televisa that premiered on November 30, 1998 and ended on March 19, 1999. The series stars Angélica Rivera and Juan Soler.

== Plot ==
Ángela (Angélica Rivera) is a charming and beautiful young school teacher, with a sweet but firm character. Her only living relative is her mother, Delia (Ana Martín), a sick and embittered woman. On her deathbed, Delia makes Ángela swear an oath that she will rise to the top in life and with her last breath she curses Emilia Santillana (Jacqueline Andere), the woman who stole Ángela's father away from her.

Upon hearing at last the name that Delia had always refused to reveal, Ángela vows, with chilling determination, that she will not rest until she has found this woman and made her pay for ruining her mother's life. Emilia Santillana lives in the city of San Miguel de Allende, where she runs a very successful silver business. She owns a mine and a factory.

One day, Ángela arrives at Emilia's company seeking employment. Yolanda Rivas (Olivia Bucio), Emilia's right hand, takes pity on the seemingly sweet and shy young girl and persuades her boss to hire her. Gradually, Ángela wins her trust. Ángela is convinced of her righteousness and uses her beauty and her growing influence within the business to systematically destroy Emilia's world.

Only one person mistrusts her and is not seduced by her apparent innocence: Mariano Bautista (Juan Soler), a young engineer who works in the silver mine. Ángela tries to ignore her attraction for Mariano, but finally comes to realize that she truly loves him.

And, for the first time in her life, the promise of happiness seems within her reach when Mariano confesses that he too has fallen in love with her. Nevertheless, the oath she swore over her mother's grave binds her to her destiny and Ángela is now powerless to stop the tidal wave of destruction and suffering that she herself has unleashed.

== Cast ==
- Angélica Rivera as Ángela Bellati / Ángela Bernal
- Juan Soler as Mariano Bautista Solórzano
- Ignacio López Tarso as Feliciano Villanueva
- Jacqueline Andere as Emilia Santillana
- Ana Martín as Delia Bellati
- Juan Peláez as Humberto Gallardo
- Patricia Navidad as Ximena Chávez
- Aurora Molina as Francisca Osuna
- Ana Bertha Lepe as Lorenza Chávez
- Olivia Bucio as Yolanda Rivas
- José Elías Moreno as Father Martín Villanueva
- Manuel "Flaco" Ibáñez as Ramiro
- Ernesto Godoy as Bruno Lizárraga Miranda
- Rosángela Balbó as Esther Miranda de Lizárraga
- Harry Geithner as Julián Arizpe
- Arsenio Campos as Óscar Lizárraga
- Yolanda Ciani as Hortensia Solórzano
- Isaura Espinoza as Norma de Molina
- René Casados as Alfonso Molina
- Rossana San Juan as Susana Chávez
- Eduardo Rivera as Emeterio González
- José María Yazpik as René Bautista Solórzano
- Luz María Zetina as Diana Gallardo Santillana
- Gerardo Albarrán as Claudio Sazueta
- Rocío Gallardo as Clara García
- Joana Benedek as Catalina Lizárraga Miranda

== Notes ==
Yadhira Carrillo was originally cast as Ángela but replaced by Rivera at the last minute with little explanation causing some cast members to leave the cast in solidarity with Carrillo. Leading man Juan Soler eventually went to star with Yadhira three years later in the successful soap opera La otra.
