= Juan Apóstol, el más amado =

- Theatrical poster
- Written by: Edui Tijerina
- Directed by: Conrado Martínez
- Starring: Mané de la Parra; Marjorie de Sousa; Livia Brito
- Music by: Paul Rubinstein
- Country of origin: Mexico
- Original language: Spanish

Production
- Cinematography: Khristian Olivares
- Production company: Beverly Hills Entertainment

Original release
- Release: April 2019

Juan Apóstol, el más amado is a 2016 Mexican film produced by Beverly Hills Entertainment who previously produced the film Santiago Apóstol, and also is based on the life of John the Apostle, one of the most outstanding disciples of Jesus of Nazareth. The film stars Mané de la Parra as John the Apostle, Marjorie de Sousa as Mary Magdalene, and Livia Brito as Mary, mother of Jesus.

== Cast ==
- Mané de la Parra as John the Apostle
- Marjorie de Sousa as Mary Magdalene
- Livia Brito as Mary, mother of Jesus
- Alicia Machado
- Cristian Rivero
- Sissi Fleitas es Santa María Salomé
- Boris Izaguirre es Pontius Pilate
