= Sixto Valencia Burgos =

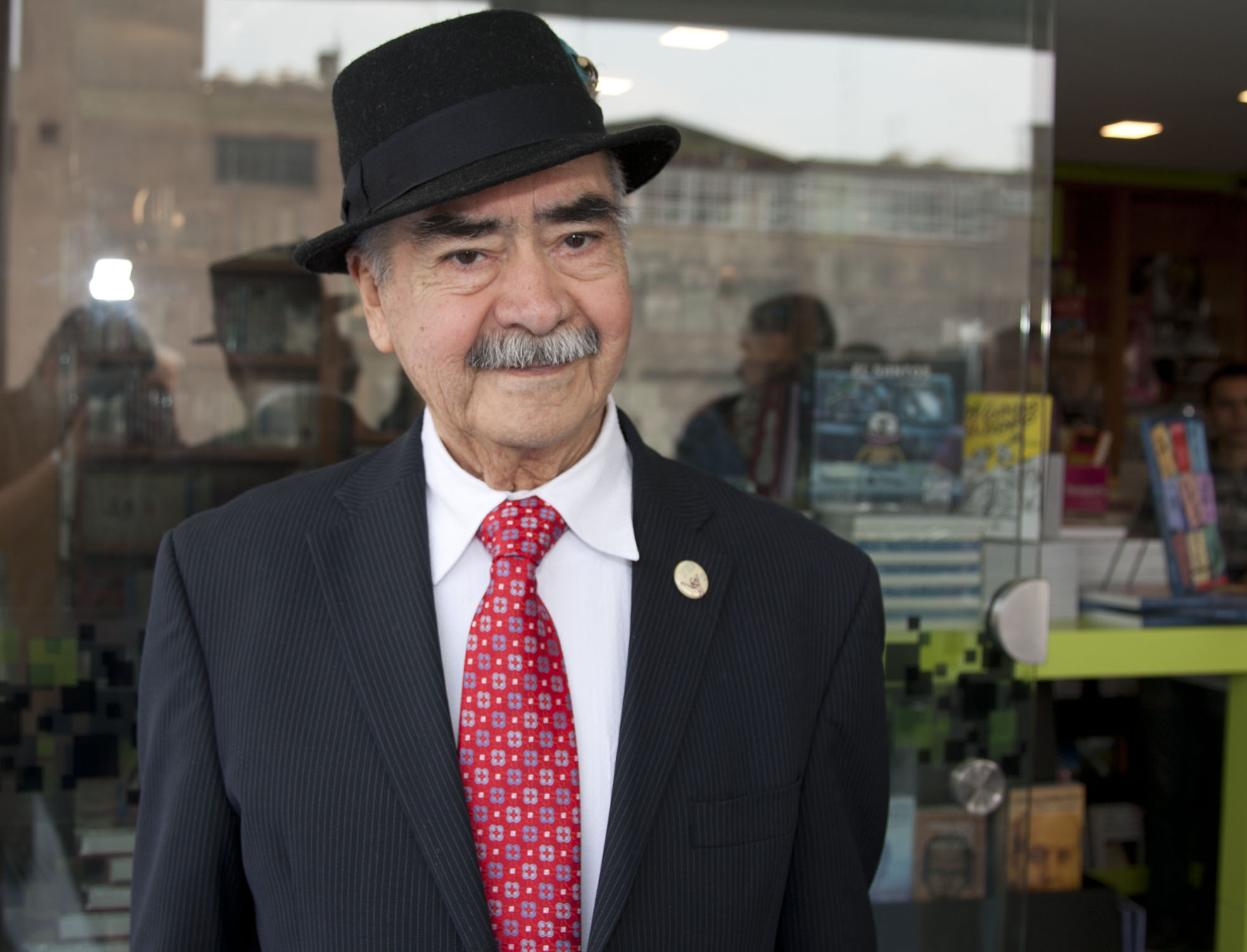
Image of Sixto Valencia Burgos

Sixto Valencia Burgos (March 28, 1934 – April 23, 2015) was a Mexican cartoon artist based in Mexico City, best known for taking over the responsibility of drawing famed Mexican cartoon character Memín Pinguín. This cartoon was very criticized by the USA media as it was considered racist because Memín, the main character, was drawn with a very gross black racist stereotype.

== Early life and career ==
Valencia was born in Tezontepec, Hidalgo, Mexico in 1934. He started sketching characters at age 11, when he and his family moved to Mexico City. Valencia started working as a caricature artist early and never went to high school.

In 1963, Valencia began drawing the best-selling Memín Pinguín, a black-and-white comic book that sold 700,000 copies by 1977.

Between 1992 and 1993, Valencia was the editor of the Spanish version of the Mad magazine.

Valencia had been the president of SOMEHI (Syndicate of Mexican comic book artists) since 1998.
