= Return of the Gunfighter =

1967 TV film

- DVD cover
- Screenplay by: Robert Buckner
- Story by: Burt Kennedy; Robert Buckner
- Directed by: James Neilson
- Starring: Robert Taylor; Chad Everett; Ana Martín
- Music by: Hans J. Salter
- Country of origin: United States
- Original language: English

Production
- Producers: Frank King; Maurice King; Irving Starr
- Cinematography: Ellsworth Fredericks
- Editor: Richard V. Heermance
- Running time: 98 minutes
- Production company: King Brothers Productions

Original release
- Release: January 29, 1967

Return of the Gunfighter is a 1967 American Western television film directed by James Neilson and starring Robert Taylor, Chad Everett and Ana Martín. Though intended for theatrical release, it was instead shown on television. Old Tucson and Sabino canyon are areas in the film.

== Plot ==
In 1878, an old gunslinger Ben Wyatt is released from prison after five years. He meets Lee Sutton, who is on the run for killing a man in a gunfight. Wyatt finds that his close friends the Domingos have been killed. He takes Sutton, who is weak from being wounded in the gunfight, to find Anisa Domingo, the daughter of Wyatt's slain friends. Wyatt agrees to let Anisa help him find her parents' killers.

The three ride toward Lordsburg. Sutton leaves them to go to his family's ranch. He and Anisa say goodbye but hope to see each other again. With Anisa's help, Wyatt finds the men responsible and they are Sutton's brothers. Wyatt kills one in a street gunfight in self-defense.

Lee finds that his older brother, Clay, killed Anisa's parents. Lee leaves the ranch for Lordsburg to free Wyatt, who is in jail for the gunfight. Together, they defeat Clay and his thugs to save Anisa from being killed as the only witness to Clay's murders.

== Cast ==
- Robert Taylor as Ben Wyatt
- Chad Everett as Lee Sutton
- Ana Martín as Anisa
- Mort Mills as Will Parker
- Lyle Bettger as Clay Sutton
- John Davis Chandler as Sundance
- Michael Pate as Frank Boone
- Barry Atwater as Lomax
- John Crawford as Butch Cassidy
- Willis Bouchey as Judge Ellis
- Rodolfo Hoyos, Jr. as Luis Domingo (as Rodolfo Hoyos)
- Boyd 'Red' Morgan as Wid Boone
- Henry Wills as Sam Boone
- Robert Shelton as Cowboy
- Loretta Miller as Dance Hall Girl
- Janell Alden as Dance Hall Girl

== See also ==
- List of American films of 1967
