= Olivia Bucio =

Mexican actress

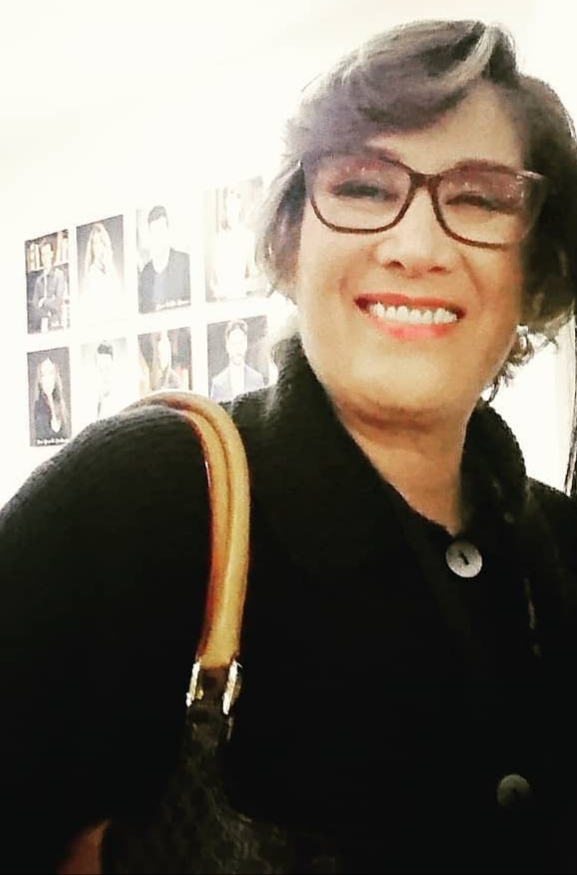
- Born: October 26, 1954 (age 70); Uruapan, Michoacán, Mexico
- Occupation: Actress
- Years active: 1980–present

Olivia Bucio (born October 26, 1954, in Uruapan, Michoacán, Mexico), is a Mexican actress. She worked with Televisa as an actress of telenovelas.

== Filmography ==
=== Television ===
Year	Title	Role	Notes
1980	Conflictos de un médico	Isabel	Television debut
1982	El amor nunca muere	Gloria	
1988	Amor en silencio	Elena Robles	
1990	Amor de nadie	Lena	
1995	Alondra	Carmelina de Díaz	
1996	Sentimientos ajenos	Eva	
1997	Pueblo chico, infierno grande	Eloísa	
1998	Ángela	Yolanda Rivas	
2000	Locura de amor	Irene Ruelas	
2001	El manantial	Gertrudis Rivero	
2002	Cómplices al rescate	Marcela Ricca	
2003	Amor real	Unknown role	
2004	Rubí	Carla de Cárdenas	
2004	Rubí, la descarada	Carla de Cárdenas	Television film
2004	Alegrijes y rebujos	Teresa Aguayo	
2005	Alborada	Asunción Díaz Montero de Escobar	
2007	Destilando amor	Fedra Iturbe de Montalvo	
2007	Sexo y otros secretos	Actress	"Date cuenta" (Season 1, Episode 3)
2008–09	En nombre del amor	Diana Noriega de Sáenz	
2009	Mujeres asesinas	Elsa	"Cecilia, prohibida" (Season 2, Episode 10)
2010–11	Cuando me enamoro	Inés Fonseca de Del Valle	
2011	El encanto del águila	Carmen Alatriste	"Los Mártires de Puebla" (Season 1, Episode 2)
2012	Amor bravío	Agustina Santos	
2013–14	Quiero amarte	Dolores	
2014–15	Hasta el fin del mundo	Greta	Adult Protagonist
2016	Tres veces Ana	Nerina Lascano	Supporting Role
2017-2019	Mi marido tiene familia	Catalina Rivera	Supporting Role (Seasons 1-2)
2018	Sin tu mirada	Encarnación Bazán	Recurring Role
2020-2021	Quererlo todo	Dalia Coronel	Supporting Role

=== Television programs ===
Year	Title	Role	Notes
2003	El Show de Cristina	Herself	Episode: "El elenco de El manantial"
