= Rubí (2004 TV series) =

- Promotional poster
- Genre: Telenovela
- Created by: Ximena Suárez; Virginia Quintana
- Based on: Rubí by Yolanda Vargas Dulché
- Written by: Araceli Guajardo
- Story by: Yolanda Vargas Dulché
- Directed by: Benjamín Cann; Eric Morales
- Creative director: Sandra Cortéz
- Starring: Bárbara Mori; Eduardo Santamarina; Jacqueline Bracamontes; Sebastián Rulli; Ana Martín
- Theme music composer: Reyli
- Opening theme: "La descarada" performed by Reyli
- Country of origin: Mexico
- Original language: Spanish
- No. of episodes: 115

Production
- Executive producer: José Alberto Castro
- Producers: Ernesto Hernández; Fausto Sáinz
- Production locations: Mexico City, Mexico; Valle de Bravo, Mexico; Cancún, Mexico; New York City, United States; Mérida, Mexico; Montreal, Canada; Madrid, Spain; Vienna, Austria; Ixtapa, Mexico; Cuernavaca, Mexico; Las Vegas, United States
- Cinematography: Alejandro Frutos; Bernardo Nájera
- Editors: Héctor Flores; Omar Blanco; Alejandro Iglesias
- Camera setup: Multi-camera
- Production company: Televisa

Original release
- Network: Canal de las Estrellas
- Release: May 17 – October 22, 2004

Related
- Rubí (1968 TV series); Rubi (2010 TV series); Ruby (2012 TV series); Rubí (2020 TV series)

Rubí is a Mexican telenovela produced by José Alberto Castro for Televisa. It is based on a comic strip by Yolanda Vargas Dulché, published in installments on the 1960s Mexican romance comics magazine Lágrimas, risas y amor.

Starring Bárbara Mori, Eduardo Santamarina, Jacqueline Bracamontes, Sebastián Rulli and Ana Martín.

Canal de las Estrellas aired Rubí from May 17 to October 22, 2004, with Apuesta por un amor replacing it. Univision broadcast Rubí from September 20, 2004 to March 7, 2005 and has named it as the top telenovela of all time.

== Plot ==
In the heart of Rubí (Bárbara Mori) reigns a constant struggle between every woman's desire to find true love and a desperate obsession with money. Although fate has denied her a good economic situation, it has instead favored her with extraordinary physical beauty and Rubí is determined to use it to marry a rich man who will give her the life of luxury she aspires to.

Rubí studies at a private university thanks to a half scholarship and the support of her sister, Cristina (Paty Díaz), who works hard to help their mother support the household.

At the university, Rubí befriends Maribel (Jacqueline Bracamontes), a millionaire yet sweet and simple girl, who was left disabled in one leg by an accident. Maribel thinks that, more than a friend, she has found a sister in Rubí and she cares for her sincerely, without knowing that Rubí's affection is poisoned by envy.

When the beautiful young woman visits her friend's mansion, she becomes convinced that this is the kind of life she deserves and she will do whatever it takes to get it.

Maribel, a shy young woman because of her physical defect, spends hours on her computer chatting on the Internet with a young man named Héctor (Sebastián Rulli) and soon after they become a couple without ever having met. When they finally meet in person, Héctor overcomes Maribel's disability and asks her to marry him. Maribel accepts, happy and in love.

Héctor introduces Rubí to his best friend, a young orthopedic doctor named Alejandro (Eduardo Santamarina), and a deep love is born between them as well. When Maribel finds out, she feels that her happiness is complete. Rubí is also happy, because in addition to being in love with Alejandro, she thinks that life will finally do her justice when she marries a handsome and rich doctor who furthermore adores her. That is why she is so disappointed when she finds out that Alejandro's family is not wealthy.

Rubí has to choose between marrying the man she loves and her desperate desire to be rich and, even though she knows that another love like this may never come into her life, she breaks off her relationship.

Heartbroken, Alejandro walks away and devotes himself to his profession. Rubí is more determined than ever to marry a millionaire, and to achieve this, she is willing to resort to betrayal by stealing Héctor's love from Maribel.

However, even though her dream of luxury and wealth comes true when she marries Héctor, Rubí will finally have to learn a painful lesson: that vanity, pride and greed are terrible sins and divine justice is implacable.

== Cast ==
=== Main ===
- Bárbara Mori as Rubí Pérez Ochoa
- Eduardo Santamarina as Dr. Alejandro Cárdenas Ruiz
- Jacqueline Bracamontes as Maribel de la Fuente
- Sebastián Rulli as Héctor Ferrer Garza
- Ana Martín as Refugio Ochoa Vda. de Pérez

=== Recurring ===
- Josefina Echánove as Francisca “Pancha” Muñoz
- Antonio Medellín as Ignacio Cárdenas
- Ana Bertha Espín as Elisa de Duarte
- José Elías Moreno as Genaro Duarte
- Olivia Bucio as Carla Ruiz de Cárdenas
- Luis Gatica as Cayetano Martínez
- Leonorilda Ochoa as Dolores Herrera Guzmán "Doña Lola"
- Roberto Vander as Arturo de la Fuente
- Ofelia Cano as Victoria Gallegos
- Miguel Pizarro as Loreto Echagüe
- Paty Díaz as Cristina Pérez Ochoa
- Arlette Pacheco as Lilia López de Duarte
- Jan as Marco Rivera
- Íngrid Martz as Lorena Treviño
- Dolores Salomón "Bodokito" as Mariquita
- Roberto Sen as David Treviño
- Sergio Jurado as Lawyer Millán
- José Antonio Ferral as Dr. Garduño
- María Fernanda García as Valeria
- Eduardo Rodríguez as Saúl Arce de la Borbolla
- Sergio Argueta as Francisco "Paco" Gómez Gallegos
- Jorge Flores as himself
- Marco Méndez as Luis Duarte López
- Tania Vázquez as Sofía "Sofí" Cárdenas Ruiz
- Ramón Menéndez as Pichardo
- Hugo Macías as Isidro Roldán
- Sergio Zaldívar as Gazcón
- Mariana Rountree as Íngrid Mendoza
- Manuel Foyo as Ernesto Bermúdez Aranda
- Karen Sandoval as Natalia "Naty" Duarte
  - Nicole Vale as child Naty
- Kristel Casteele as Fernanda "Fernandita" Martínez Pérez
  - Bárbara Mori as older Fernanda

=== Guest stars ===
- Yadhira Carrillo as Elena Navarro
- Manuel Landeta as Lucio Montemayor, Count of Aragon
- Sergio Goyri as Yago Pietrasanta
- Carlos Cámara as Dr. José Luis Bermúdez
- Adriana Roel as Hilda Méndez
- Lorena Velázquez as Mary Echavarría
- Lilia Aragón as Nora Vda. de Navarro
- Manuel "Flaco" Ibáñez as Onésimo Segundo
- Gerardo Albarrán as Gabriel Almanza
- Alicia Farh as Romina
- Marlene Favela as Sonia Echavarría

== Awards and nominations ==
Year	Award	Category	Nominee(s)	Result
2005	TVyNovelas Awards			
2005	TVyNovelas Awards	Best Telenovela	José Alberto Castro	Won
2005	TVyNovelas Awards	Best Actress	Bárbara Mori	Won
2005	TVyNovelas Awards	Best Actor	Eduardo Santamarina	Won
2005	TVyNovelas Awards	Best Antagonist Actor	Manuel Landeta	Nominated
2005	TVyNovelas Awards	Best Supporting Actress	Ana Martín	Won
2005	TVyNovelas Awards	Best Supporting Actor	Roberto Vander	Nominated
2005	TVyNovelas Awards	Best Musical Theme	"La descarada" by Reyli	Won
2005	TVyNovelas Awards	Best Direction	Benjamín Cann; Eric Morales	Won
2005	TVyNovelas Awards	Special Award for Telenovela with the Highest Rating in 2004	Rubí	Won
2005	Juventud Awards			
2005	Juventud Awards	Girl That Takes My Sleep Away	Bárbara Mori	Won
2005	Latin ACE Awards			
2005	Latin ACE Awards	Male Face of the Year in Television	Sebastián Rulli	Won
2010	TP de Oro			
2010	TP de Oro	Best Telenovela	Rubí	Nominated
2010	TP de Oro	Best Protagonist of the Decade		
2010	Golden Awards Of The Decade	Best Protagonist of the Decade	Bárbara Mori	Won

== Reception ==
Canal de las Estrellas' October 22 finale broadcast of Rubí earned a rating of 28 points. Univision's March 7 finale broadcast of Rubí was watched by 8 million viewers.

== Remakes ==
In 1968, the original version for television, titled Rubí, was directed by Fernando Wagner and produced by Valentín Pimstein, starring Fanny Cano, Antonio Medellín and Carlos Fernández.

In 1970, a film version with the same name as the telenovela was produced, directed and adapted by Carlos Enrique Taboada, starring Irán Eory, Aldo Monti and Carlos Bracho.

In February 2010, ABS-CBN announced Televisa had given them permission to make a Philippine version of the series. The Philippine adaptation stars Angelica Panganiban and Shaina Magdayao as the female leads, with Jake Cuenca and Diether Ocampo as the male leads. It was launched as one of the network's offerings for the 60th year celebration of Philippine television dramas ("ika-60 taon ng Pinoy Soap Opera") during the Trade Launch for the 1st quarter that same year, entitled "Bagong Simula" (New Beginning).

In January 2012, O3, with permission from Televisa, produced an Arabic version of the series titled Ruby. The Arabic adaptation stars Cyrine Abdelnour and Diamant Abou Abboud as the female leads, alongside Maxim Khalil and Amir Karara as the male leads. It was aired on MBC1 in the Arab world and LBCI in Lebanon.

In January 2020, Univision made a remake starring Camila Sodi. The 2020 version serves at the same time as a sequel to the 2004 telenovela as it follows events 20 years after the story's ending.
