= Alondra (TV series) =

- Genre: Telenovela; Romance; Drama
- Created by: Yolanda Vargas Dulché
- Written by: Yolanda Vargas Dulché; Martha Carrillo; Roberto Hernández Vázquez
- Directed by: Miguel Córcega; Mónica Miguel
- Starring: Gonzalo Vega; Ana Colchero; Ernesto Laguardia
- Narrated by: Diana Bracho
- Opening theme: "Alondra" by Jose Pablo Gamboa
- Country of origin: Mexico
- Original language: Spanish
- No. of episodes: 160

Production
- Executive producer: Carla Estrada
- Producer: Arturo Lorca
- Production locations: Filming; Televisa San Ángel; Mexico City, Mexico
- Cinematography: Alejandro Frutos; Isabel Basurto
- Running time: 21-22 minutes
- Production company: Televisa

Original release
- Network: Canal de las Estrellas
- Release: January 23 – September 1, 1995

Related
- El vuelo del águila; Acapulco, cuerpo y alma

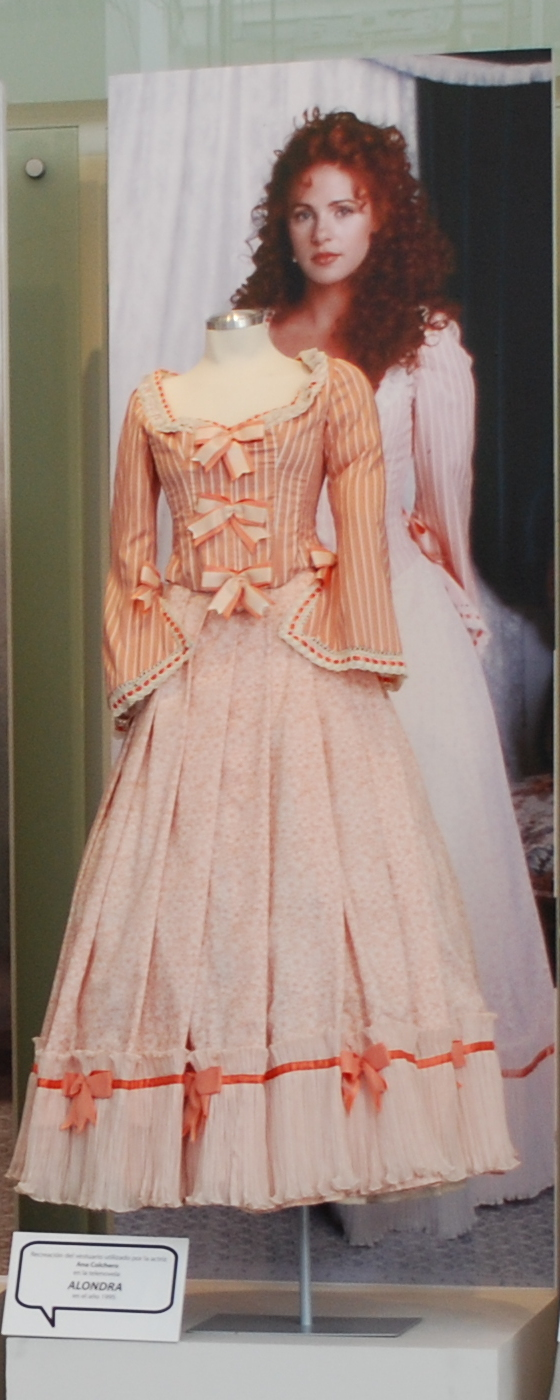
Costumes and posters of Vargas Dulché's characters as interpreted on telenovelas at the homage to Yolanda Vargas Duché at the Museo de Arte Popular in Mexico City

Alondra is a Mexican telenovela produced by Carla Estrada for Televisa in 1995. The story based on Casandra created by Yolanda Vargas Dulché. For personal reasons Yolanda Vargas Dulché changed the name of Casandra to Alondra in honor of her granddaughter Alondra de la Parra. It stars Gonzalo Vega, Ana Colchero and Ernesto Laguardia.

== Plot ==
After the death of Alondra's mother, her father Baldomero, who feels sad and lonely, brings his sister Loreta and her two kids, Maria Elisa and Rigoberto to live in his house, hoping that Loreta will replace a mother to Alondra. But he is mistaken. Loreta hates Alondra, as she reminds her of Alondra's mother who used to be an actress and whom Baldomero's family never accepted. Years go by, and Alondra grows up into a beautiful, rebellious girl, with very independent and progressive views for that time.

Her constant fights with Loreta continue, but now she learned how to fight back. In the meantime, Baldomero spends most of the time on his ranch in arms of his new love Carmelina, unaware of what's going on in his house. Loreta manages to make Alondra's life a living hell, including her own daughter's, Maria Elisa, a shy and weak girl.

While Loreta tries to force her into a marrying a rich old man, Maria Elisa is in love with Raul, a young officer. To make matters worse, Loreta's evil and ambitious son, Rigoberto, gets kicked out of a seminary and returns home, also torturing Alondra and Maria Elisa. Alondra meets a retired and famous singer, Leticia del Bosque, whom influences and advises Alondra and suggests that she goes to the ranch and tells everything to Baldomero. On Alondra's way to the ranch, she accidentally meets Bruno. They live a very passionate love, but she later discovers that he is married and has two children. Further more, on the ranch she finds out that her father is going to re-marry for the second time. Disappointed she returns home, where she finds that Maria Elisa is also upset, as she is pregnant and believes that Raul has abandoned her.

The two girls decide to go to Mexico City in search for a better life, success and new love. And it is in Mexico City that Alondra, who has started a flower business, meets Carlos. But her forbidden love for Bruno is not over yet.

== Cast ==
- Gonzalo Vega as Bruno Leblanc
- Ana Colchero as Alondra Díaz del Real
- Ernesto Laguardia as Carlos Támez
- Beatriz Sheridan as Loreto Díaz Vda. de Escobar
- Marga López as Leticia del Bosque
- Eric del Castillo as Baldomero Díaz
- Héctor Gómez as Father Gervacio
- Verónica Merchant as María Elisa Escobar Díaz
- Beatriz Aguirre as Rosita
- Amparo Arozamena as Matilde "Maty" Ruiz
- Juan Manuel Bernal as Rigoberto Escobar
- Fernando Colunga as Tte. Raúl Gutiérrez
- Olivia Bucio as Carmelina Hernández de Díaz
- Emoé de la Parra as Cristina Leblanc
- Gustavo Ganem as Ramiro Estrada
- Silvia Mariscal as Mercedes Vda. de Támez
- Blanca Torres as Barbarita
- Diana Bracho as Alondra (voice)
- Queta Carrasco as Rosario
- Dina de Marco as Trini Gómez
- Ernesto Godoy as Robertito Hurtado
- Queta Lavat as Concepción Hurtado
- Justo Martínez as Jorge
- Aurora Molina as Rita
- Mónika Sánchez as Enriqueta
- Guillermo Murray as Lic. Pelegrín Casasola
- Bertín Osborne as Captain Andrés Kloszt
- Angelina Peláez as Librada Perez Aguayo
- Tina Romero as Cecilia
- Anahí as Margarita Leblanc
- Yuliana Peniche as Alondra (child)
- Katie Barberi as Rebecca Montes de Oca
- Joel Núñez as Germán Aguirre
- Omar Gutiérrez as Javier Leblanc
- Rodolfo Vélez as Don Pablo Miranda
- Bertha Moss as Sofía Lascurain
- Jorge Alberto Bolaños as Miguel
- Gabriela Murray as Antonieta "Teta" Gomez
- Jorge Martínez de Hoyos as Alfredito
- Mauricio Achar as Jesús "Chucho" Aguirre
- Consuelo Duval as Blanqita de Aguirre
- Irene Arcila as Jovita
- Nerina Ferrer as Gloria de Casasola
- Sergio Klainer as Lic. Gonzalo Rios
- Alejandro Villeli as Jacinto Alatorre
- Luis Couturier as Leticia's notary
- Jacqueline Andere as Verónica del Real de Díaz
- Lourdes Deschamps as Celia
- Teo Tapia as Lic. Ortigoza
- Roxana Ramos as Berthita "Tita" Gómez
- José Antonio Barón as Mario
- Guillermo Aguilar as Luis
- Valentina García as María Elisa Escobar Díaz (child)
- Isaac Edid as Rigoberto Escobar Díaz (child)
- Maritza Aldana as María
- Alfredo Alfonso as Leopoldo
- Dulcina Carballo as Rufina
- Rafael de Quevedo as Ordóñez
- José Antonio Ferral as El Tejón
- Arturo Guízar as Joaquín
- Lucía Irurita as Eduviges
- Rodolfo Lago as Francisco
- Willebaldo López as Martínez
- Arturo Lorca as Pancho
- Ximena Sariñana as Pilarica
- Juan Antonio Llanes as Tolemán
- Carlos Osiris as Mireles
- Benjamín Pineda as José
- Soledad Ruiz as Genoveva
- Víctor Zeuz as Daniel
- Martín Rojas as Marcos
- Fabiola Stevenson as Lucía
- Sebastián Garza as Rolando Acuña
- Arturo Paulet as Octavio Bertolini
- Luis Robles as Celestino
- Genoveva Pérez as Petra
- Gustavo del Castillo as Pedro
- Catalina López as Carlotta "Tota" Gómez
- Alberto Larrazabal as Ramón Hanhausen
- Zoila Quiñones as Florist Lady
- Luis Bayardo as Father
- Julio Monterde as Doctor
- Dulce María as Child in the church

== Awards and nominations ==
Year	Award	Category	Nominee	Result
1996	14th TVyNovelas Awards	Best Actor	Ernesto Laguardia	Nominated
1996	14th TVyNovelas Awards	Best Actor	Gonzalo Vega	Nominated
1996	14th TVyNovelas Awards	Best Leading Actor	Eric del Castillo	Nominated
1996	14th TVyNovelas Awards	Best Supporting Actress	Verónica Merchant	Won
1996	14th TVyNovelas Awards	Best Young Lead Actress	Anahí	Nominated
1996	14th TVyNovelas Awards	Best Original Story or Adaptation	Yolanda Vargas Dulché	Won
1996	14th TVyNovelas Awards	Best Costume Design	Silvia Terán; Lorena Pérez	Won
1996	Latin ACE Awards	Best Scenic Program	Alondra	Won
1996	Latin ACE Awards	Best Actor	Gonzalo Vega	Won
1996	Latin ACE Awards	Best Direction	Miguel Córcega	Won
