= Yolanda Vargas Dulché =

Mexican writer (1926-1999)

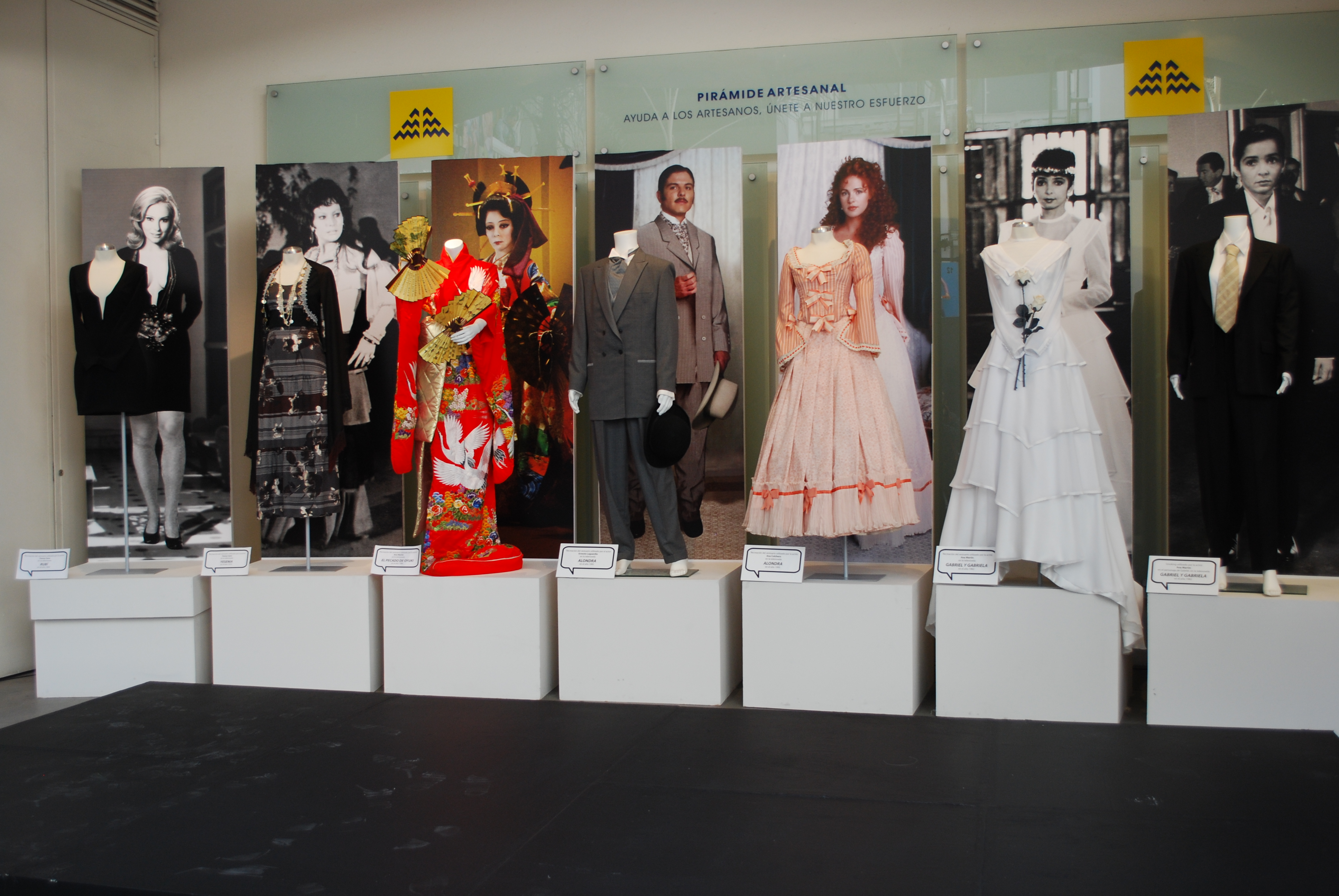
Display of costumes and posters from various telenovelas created by Vargas Dulché at the Museo de Arte Popular.

Yolanda Vargas Dulché de la Parra (Spanish: [ʝoˈlanda ˈβaɾɣas ðulˈtʃe ðe la ˈpara]; born July 18, 1926, Mexico City) – August 8, 1999, Mexico City) was a Mexican writer principally known for the creation of the comic book character of Memín Pinguín and various telenovelas for Mexican television. She began her writing career as a way to supplement income for several newspapers, creating Memín Penguín in 1943. By 1960, she has successfully published a number of comic books, encouraging her husband, Guillermo de la Parra, to write as well. The two went on to create various successful telenovelas including Rubí, which has been redone for both television and film. In total Varga Dulché published over sixty titles in both Mexico and abroad. Rubí was published between 1963 and 1964 in the romance comic book Lágrimas, Risas y Amor.

Also in the comics, Yolanda Vargas Dulché created the character Memín Pinguín.

== Life ==
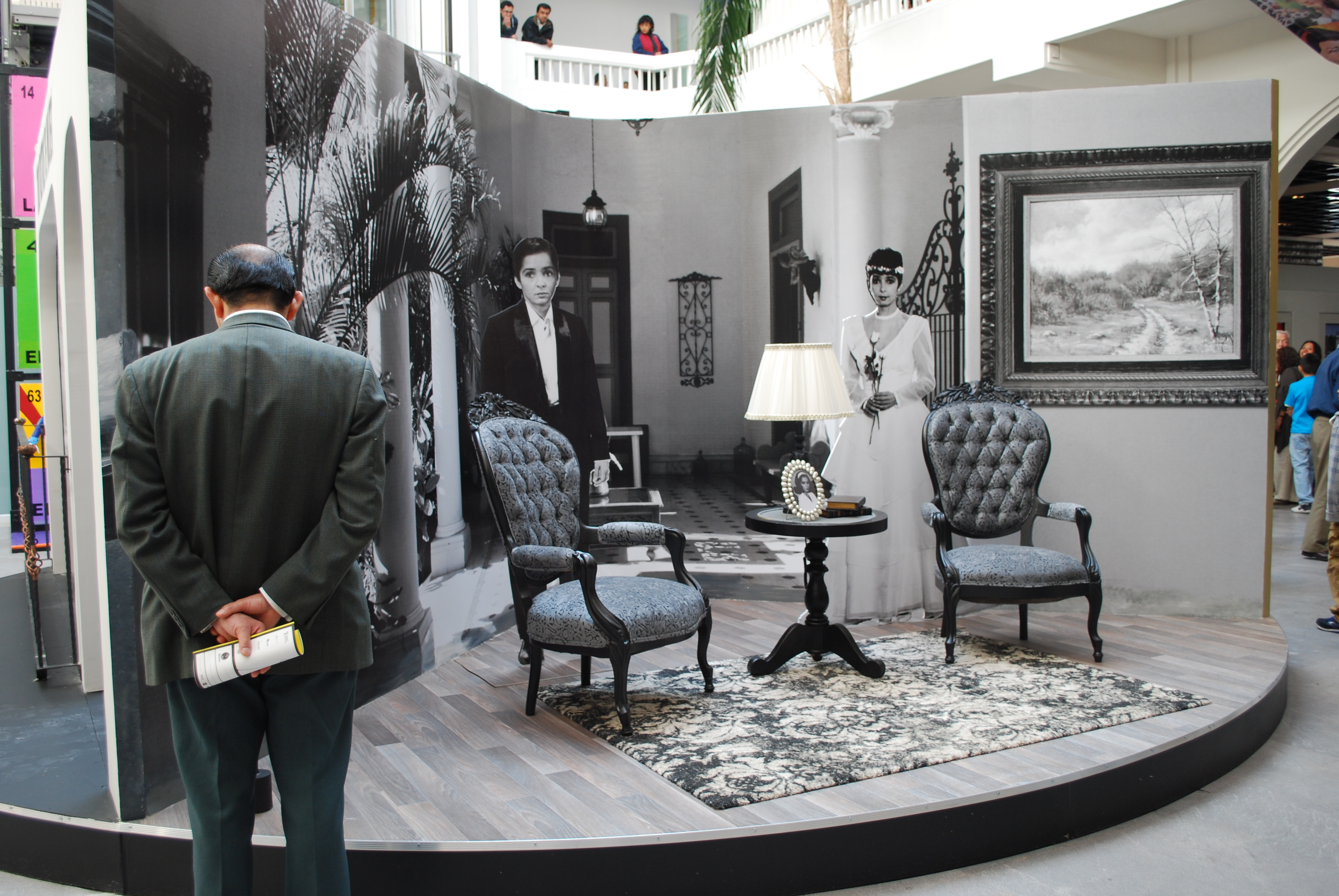
Museum visitor looking at a mock set representing the telenovela Gabriel y Gabriela

Vargas Dulché was born to poor parents Armando Vargas de la Maza and Josefina Dulché in Mexico City along with one sister, Elba. The family's unstable economic situation meant that the family moved frequently, causing the girls to change schools. However, this brought Yolanda into contact with various elements of Mexican society, which would influence the creation of her literary characters later. These frequent moves included a stay in the United States with her sister for a short time before moving back to Mexico City permanently.

To make ends meet, Vargas Dulché worked at several jobs. She collaborated with Emilio Azcárraga Vidaurreta on radio station XEW-AM singing songs by Agustín Lara, Pedro Vargas and Toña la Negra and then forming a duet with her sister called "Rubia y Morena" which sang with Agustín Lara. Her career as a writer began to supplement income from singing.

While working as a writer she met her husband Guillermo de la Parra with whom she had five children including actress Emoé de la Parra and Manelick de la Parra. She also has eleven grandchildren which include singers/actor Mané de la Parra and musician Alondra de la Parra.

With her husband she had success as a writer, comic book illustrator and producer of telenovelas and films. With her own money, she constructed an entire town in the state of Durango, homes, schools, etc., which still exists. She also created a chain of hotels in Mexico.

She died on August 8, 1999, after finishing a short autobiography called Aroma del tiempo.

== Career as a writer ==
During her career she was a singer, journalist, mother and businesswoman, but she is best known for her comic book work, especially Memín Pinguín, and the writing and producing of telenovelas from the 1940s to the 1990s. She began her writing career as a way to supplement income from singing, beginning with the ESTO newspaper and Editorial Argumentos. She then began writing essays and stories for the El Pepín magazine, where she first created a black character in the 1940s which would develop into Memín Pinguín. The name was derived from her then boyfriends nickname of Pingo. She also wrote for Novedades de México. She then was hired by the Chamaco publication for three times what she was making before. However, because of personal conflict with her boss, she saved her money and when she could, left the publication to create her own company but this failed.

Despite the failure she had published over a dozen profitable comic books by 1960. Her success encouraged her husband to write, creating his first success called Rarotonga. Their combined success provided sufficient income to found Grupo Editorial Vid and begin to produce telenovelas and films with their major productions being "Cinco rostros de mujer," "María Isabel," "Yesenía", "Rubí," "Ladronzuela" and Gabriel y Gabriela." Most of these are inspired by series published in the comic book Lágrimas, Risas y Amor.

Her comic book writing style is considered to be unique and was popular in Mexico for over forty years, especially with the lower classes. At the height of her popularity she was the most read woman in Mexico, after only Corín Tellado in the Spanish language in general, with her comics selling 25 million copies a month. She had over sixty works published in Mexico as well as Indonesia, China, Japan, Italy, Colombia, the United States and the Philippines.

She is considered to be a pioneer in popular literature in Mexico, called the "Queen of the comic books" . Her work received various recognitions including that of the first Convención Nacional de Cómic y Ciencia Ficción of Mexico City. In 2006, the book "La reina de la historietas de México" was published by Mexican cinematographer David Ramón and published by the Sociedad General de Escritores de México. In 2012, the Museo de Arte Popular in collaboration with Editorial Vid and Televisa paid homage to Vargas Dulché with an exhibition of her work, especially how it appeared on film and television.

== Works ==
Her major works include comics and screenplays for Mexican telenovelas, with some over her comic work crossing over into film and television. Her most important comic work is based on a character called Memín Pinguín, considered to be an icon of Mexican comic books. Created in 1943 the comic is about a black boy with exaggerated features who is a dreamer and a trickster but always does what is right. His name was inspired by her husband Guillermo de la Parra, who was called "pingo" (meaning jester or trickster in Mexican Spanish) by his colleagues because of his jokes. The character, which appears in film and radio along with comic books is an important part of modern Mexican popular culture still. In 1985, the Mexican ministry of education declared Memín Pinguín required reading in public schools because "it promotes respect for the family and institutions in students." She began publishing other stories and comics in the 1950s. Other comic book characters include a series called El Pecado de Oyuki (Oyuki's Sin) based on a Japanese woman, and María Isabel, about a poor indigenous women who comes to the city with a little girl, who is not her daughter. María Isabel was played by actress Silvia Pinal for the film version.

Her other major works were telenovelas, novels adapted into a series on television with a definite beginning and end. One of the most important of these include Rubí (1969), about a smart and beautiful woman whose main interests are money and power. A 2004 version of Rubí stars Bárbara Mori, Eduardo Santamarina, Jacqueline Bracamontes, Sebastián Rulli and Ana Martín, and a teleserye version of the story was created in the Philippines in 2010. Other successful radio novels and telenovelas include Cinco rostros de mujer (1947), Zorina (1949), Ladronzuela (1949) Yesenia (1970), Encrucijada (1970), El amor de María Isabel (1971), Gabriel y Gabriela (1982) and Alondra (1995) .
