= Yuliana Peniche =

Mexican actress (born 1981)

- Born: Yuliana Peniche Hernández Huici; 29 August 1981 (age 43); Mexico City, Mexico
- Occupation: Actress

Yuliana Peniche Hernández Huici (born 29 August 1981) is a Mexican actress. She has participated in various soap operas; she started when she was a little girl in Madres Egoístas (1991) as Carmen. Then she starred in Alondra, María la del Barrio, Salomé, Niña Amada Mía, Velo de novia II, and in 2005 in the TV series Bajo el mismo techo sharing credits with Laura Flores, Imanol Landeta, and José Elías Moreno. In 2007 she starred in Destilando Amor as Margarita.

== Telenovelas ==
- Un camino hacia el destino (2016) as Andrea
- Como dice el dicho (2013) as Laura
- Corazón indomable (2013) as Ofelia
- La fuerza del destino (2011) as Carmen
- Mar de amor (2009–2010) as Reyna
- Destilando amor (2007) as Margarita
- Bajo el mismo techo (2005) as Ximena Acosta
- Velo de novia (2003) as Aniseta 'Anny' Paz
- Niña Amada Mía (2003) as Luz
- Salomé (2001–2002) as Money
- María la del Barrio (1995) as Alicia Montalban Smith
- Alondra as Alondra
