= El pecado de Oyuki (TV series) =

Mexican television series

- Genre: Telenovela; Romance; Drama
- Created by: Yolanda Vargas Dulché
- Written by: Yolanda Vargas Dulché
- Directed by: Benjamin Cann
- Starring: Ana Martín; Salvador Sánchez; Jorge Martínez de Hoyos; Rafael Sánchez Navarro; Martha Roth; Anna Silvetti; Yoshio; Boy Olmi
- Opening theme: "El Pecado de Oyuki" by Bebu Silvetti
- Country of origin: Mexico
- Original language: Spanish
- No. of episodes: 123-125

Production
- Executive producer: Lucy Orozco
- Production locations: Mexico City, Mexico; Tokyo, Japan; Kyoto, Japan
- Cinematography: Gabriel Vázquez Bulmán
- Running time: ~40 minutes
- Production company: Televisa

Original release
- Network: Canal de las Estrellas
- Release: February 17 – August 5, 1988

El pecado de Oyuki (English title: Oyuki's Sin alt. The Sin of Oyuki) is a Mexican telenovela produced by Lucy Orozco for Televisa in 1988. The series was based on an original comic book of the same name by Yolanda Vargas Dulché, who also adapted the screenplay for television. The comic tells the story of Oyuki, a young Japanese woman unfairly exploited by her evil brother. Her tragedy is intensified by falling in love with the son of the English ambassador in Japan, which triggers a series of obstacles in her path generated by the cultural shock.

The story was adapted for the telenovela format by Vargas Dulché and produced by Lucy Orozco for Televisa.

The world premiere of the telenovela was in the United States in 1987 through Univision with one hour episodes during primetime. It was not until February 1988 when it premiered in Mexico also in primetime through El Canal de las Estrellas.

The main characters of the story were played by Mexican actress Ana Martín and Argentine actor Boy Olmi.

The telenovela became one of the biggest successful projects by Mexican television at that time, nationwide and also internationally.

== Plot ==
In the early 1970s, in a small Japanese village, lives Oyuki Ogino (Ana Martín), a beautiful woman, good and honest, whose beauty and physical attributes are used by her ambitious brother Yutaka Ogino (Salvador Sánchez), who forces her to work as a Geisha and begins to exploit her.

Forced by her brother, Oyuki begins to work while men pay large amounts for her to entertain with her show. One of those men is Irving Pointer (Boy Olmi), a painter of English origin and the son of Sir Charles Pointer (Jorge Martínez de Hoyos), the ambassador of the United Kingdom in Japan. Irving begins to paint Oyuki and both end up falling in love, but Yutaka has other plans for his sister. He plans to marry Oyuki to Togo Fushoko (Yoshio), one of the richest men in Japan. Oyuki rejects Fushoko and unleash the fury of Yutaka. When Yutaka flees from justice after committing a crime, Oyuki can be together Irving. But Irving's mother, Lady Elizabeth (Martha Roth) denies that her son is related to a Japanese woman. Given the refusal of his mother, Irving decides to run away from home and marries Oyuki. The two manage to find happiness with the arrival of their first child, who was named Yuriko.

Furious Yutaka decides to take revenge on his sister and kills Irving. Yutaka manages to escape. All evidence does not favor Oyuki, who is captured, tried and sentenced to twenty years in prison. Her daughter Yuriko, two years old, is sent with her paternal grandparents.

After fifteen long years, Yutaka confesses his crime before dying, allowing Oyuki released from prison. Free at last, Oyuki travels in search of her daughter Yuriko (Cecilia Gabriela), who is now a sophisticated English lady of 17 years old and sees her mother as a stranger.

== Cast ==
- Ana Martín as Oyuki Ogino
- Salvador Sánchez as Yutaka Ogino
- Jorge Martínez de Hoyos as Sir Charles Pointer
- Rafael Sánchez Navarro as Orson Brooks
- Martha Roth as Lady Elizabeth Pointer
- Anna Silvetti as Eliane Rohmer
- Yoshio as Togo Fushoko
- Boy Olmi as Irving Pointer
- Cecilia Gabriela as Yuriko (Lily) Pointer
- Patricio Castillo as Bertoldo Nottingham
- Evangelina Elizondo as Diana
- Noe Murayama as Kyozo
- Erika Kasuga as Sumiko
- Patricia Bernal as Margarita
- Aurora Clavel as Nanae Tayota
- Margo Su as Kiku
- Ana Luisa Peluffo as Ivette
- Guillermo Murray as Richard Rohmer
- Jorge Pais as Thomas Davidson "Tom"
- Marta Zamora as Helen
- Nuria Bages as Renee Sagan
- Carla Nakatani as Kikusan Tayota
- Blanca Torres as Orson's mother
- Margarita Isabel as Mary
- Manuel Guízar as Vedo Shibayama
- Carlos Riquelme as John Gibson
- Enrique Gilabert as Mr. Lemond
- Alicia Encinas as Reyna Lemond
- Rosita Pelayo as Greta
- Carmelita González as Shizuko
- Angelina Peláez as Keiko
- Eva Calvo as Leonor
- Frances Ondiviela as Tracie, secretary of Sr. Pointer
- Teo Tapia as Antonino
- Luis Manuel Pelayo as Rigoberto Smith

== Production ==
The executive producer Lucy Orozco made her debut in the telenovelas of Televisa on the right foot. The original idea was to record the telenovela entirely in Japan, however, Lucy, after a journey of two months of research in that country, convinced Mr. Vice President of Televisa Victor Hugo O'Farrill, to record in Mexico. Televisa build some streets of Tokyo and other Japanese cities in the hill of the Ajusco, located in the south of Mexico City. Studio finally managed to recreate on 20 hectares of land, several elegant quarters of Tokyo and a large temple. Complete streets were created, with lampposts, signs, pavement and a simulation of the Bullet Train of Tokyo. Cars with the steering wheel on the right side were imported from Europe..

The temple was the tallest building with 40 meters high; It was dismantled at the end of the recordings. The exteriors were filmed in Japan at the end of the recording in Mexico and then joined the scenes in the editing process. Orozco hired scenographers Cristina Martinez de Velasco and Teresa Pecannins, who managed to play all the hundreds of sets conceived on the comic book.

Also in Cuernavaca it was recorded a large percentage of the telenovela, in the scandalous and eccentric mansion of the American socialite Barbara Hutton, with materials from Thailand. Currently the house is occupied by the Hotel Sumiya.

An extraordinarily high budget was allocated for makeup and costumes, the Japanese makeup artist Takeshi Hazama was brought especially from Japan for the telenovela. Takeshi took approximately 2 hours to make up to Ana Martin.

In Tokyo several wigs for the protagonist were created, each with an approximate cost of $7,000. Twenty kimono they were made in Japan for the extras and the rest of the cast.

Busting the recordings of the telenovela Ana Martin was invited to Japan, because the Japanese Emperor Hirohito wanted to personally congratulate by having played brilliantly a geisha.

Later, Martin was placed in the hands of a famous surgeon in Los Angeles, because of the damage that had her eyelids and other parts close to his eyes because of constant stretch to simulate oriental eyes.

== Awards ==
Year	Award	Category	Nominee	Result
1988	Latin ACE Awards	Best Actress	Ana Martín	Won
1988	Latin ACE Awards	Best Actor	Salvador Sánchez	Won
1988	Latin ACE Awards	Best Supporting Actress	Martha Roth	Won
1988	Latin ACE Awards	Best Director	Benjamín Cann	Won
1989	7th TVyNovelas Awards	Best Telenovela	Lucy Orozco	Nominated
1989	7th TVyNovelas Awards	Best Actress	Ana Martín	Nominated
1989	7th TVyNovelas Awards	Best Antagonist Actor	Salvador Sánchez	Nominated
1989	7th TVyNovelas Awards	Best Experienced Actress	Martha Roth	Nominated
1989	7th TVyNovelas Awards	Best Experienced Actor	Jorge Martínez de Hoyos	Nominated
1989	7th TVyNovelas Awards	Best Female Revelation	Cecilia Gabriela	Nominated
1989	7th TVyNovelas Awards	Best Direction of the Cameras	Gabriel Vázquez Bulmán	Won

== Trivia ==
This was the only Mexican Telenovela dubbed in Cebuano and Hiligaynon in the Philippines from the regionals in Visayas and Mindanao, played by GMA Iloilo, Cebu and Davao.
