= Alondra de la Parra =

Mexican conductor

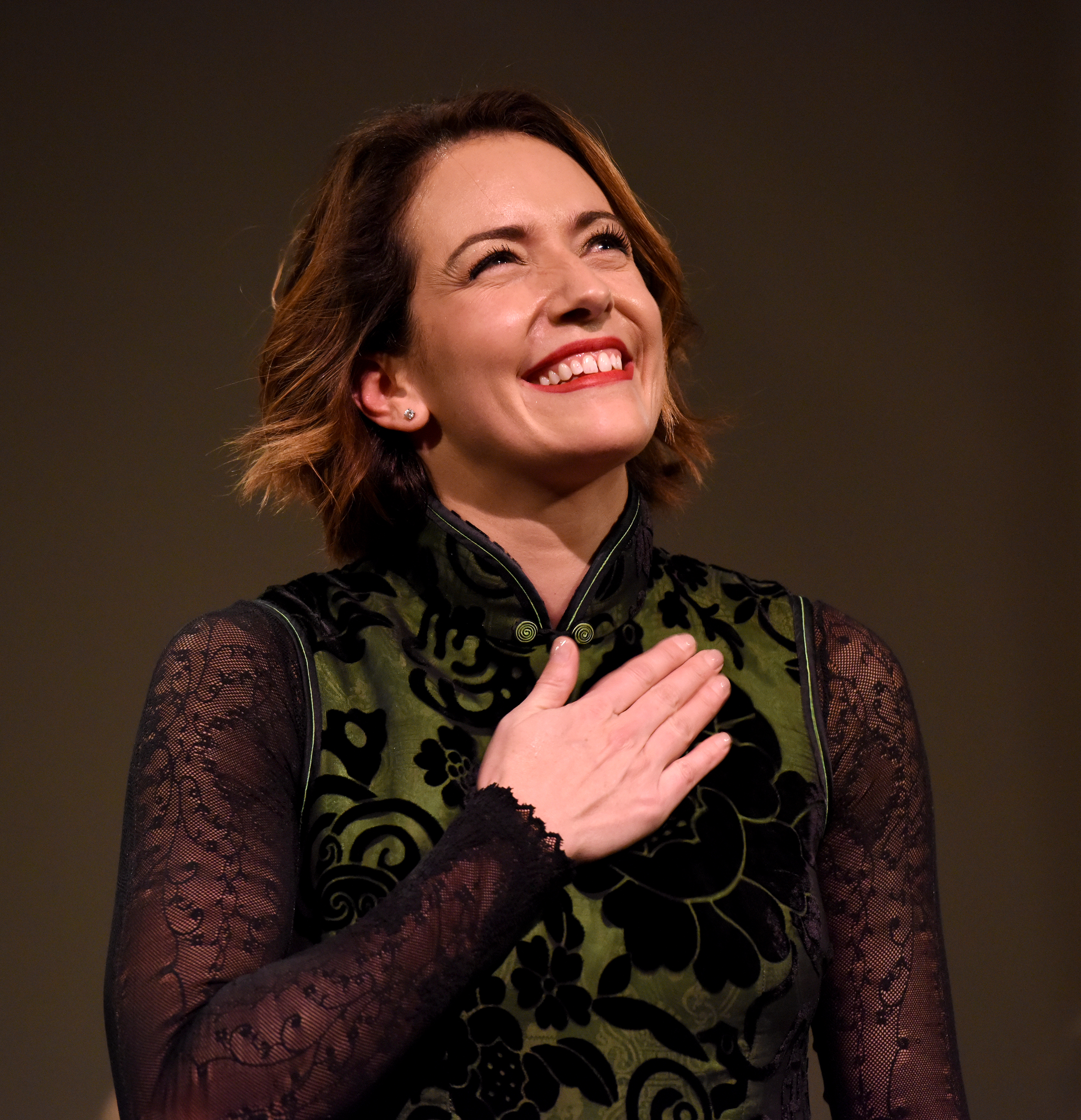
- Alondra de la Parra in 2014
- Born: 31 October 1980 (age 45); New York City
- Education: Manhattan School of Music
- Occupation: Conductor
- Years active: 1999–present
- Website: alondradelaparra.com/en/

Alondra de la Parra (born October 31, 1980) is a Mexican conductor.

== Early life and education ==
Alondra de la Parra was born in New York City, the daughter of Manelick de la Parra, a writer and editor, and Graciela Borja, a sociologist and educator. Her father was a film student at New York University and her mother a sociology student at The New School at the time of her birth and early childhood, through to the age of three. Her grandmother was the writer Yolanda Vargas Dulché, and her aunt is the actress Emoé de la Parra. Her brother is Mane de la Parra.

The family subsequently moved to Mexico City, where de la Parra began her piano studies at age seven and the cello at age 13. She also developed an interest in conducting around age 13. After a year of study at St Leonards-Mayfield School, she studied composition at the Centre of Research and Musical Studies in Mexico City.

At age 19, de la Parra returned to New York City, to study piano and conducting at the Manhattan School of Music. She obtained a Bachelor of Music in Piano Performance under the direction of Jeffrey Cohen and studied conducting with Michael Charry and Kenneth Kiesler, receiving an MA in Conducting in 2008. Her other conducting mentors include Marin Alsop, Charles Dutoit, and Kurt Masur. She served as an apprentice conductor with the New Amsterdam Symphony Orchestra.

Alondra de la Parra conducting for the Day of the Dead 2014 in New York City

== Career ==
In 2003, de la Parra founded her own ensemble, the Mexican-American Orchestra, at the behest of the Mexican Consulate, which asked de la Parra to produce a concert featuring Mexican music for the Mexico Now Festival. The resulting 65-member orchestra was renamed in 2004 the Philharmonic Orchestra of the Americas (POA). The POA toured in Mexico in 2007. The orchestra and de la Parra released two commercial recordings, Mi Alma Mexicana – My Mexican Soul, and Travieso Carmesí. In June 2011, the POA suspended operations because of financial difficulties. De la Parra was artistic director of the Orquesta Filarmónica de Jalisco from 2012 to 2013.

In May 2015, de la Parra made her first guest-conducting appearance with the Queensland Symphony Orchestra (QSO). In October 2015, the QSO announced the appointment of de la Parra as its first-ever music director and first-ever female conductor in its principal conducting post for a term of three years, 2017 to 2019. She stood down from the QSO at the end of her contract in 2019.

In 2015, de la Parra was one of five conductors featured in the film Conduct! Every Move Counts, about the international Sir Georg Solti International Conductors' Competition at the Frankfurt Opera House. In January 2024, the Spanish Ministry of Culture and La Comunidad de Madrid announced the appointment of de la Parra as the new artistic director of the Orquesta y Coro de la Comunidad de Madrid, effective with the 2024-2025 season.

== Personal life ==
De la Parra has two sons. Since 2019, she has lived in Berlin, Germany. She is an official cultural ambassador of Mexico.

== Awards ==
- Pablo Casals Award, Manhattan School of Music
- New York Women's Agenda – Rising Star of 2007
- 1010 WINS "Newsmakers of Tomorrow" Award – winner in the Arts and Entertainment category
- "Banda de Honor", highest honor given to conductors by the Venezuelan Fundación del Estado para el Sistema Nacional de las Orquestas Juveniles e Infantiles de Venezuela (FESNOJIV)
- Manhattan School of Music Taki Concordia Conducting Fellowship – Honorable Mention Award
- El Micrófono de Oro Award, (Highest prize given yearly from the Mexican Broadcasting Association)
- Presser Merit Scholarship Award, Manhattan School of Music
- Amigos de la Música Music Award, Cuernavaca, Morelos
- Luna Award, Auditorio Nacional México
- Poder Award, ABC Foundation and Poder magazine
- 2017 Sports Emmy Award for Outstanding Music Direction – "Olympic Suite" for ESPN Deportes 2016 Summer Olympics coverage
- 2018 Woman of the Year (Mexico)
- 2019 Mexican edition of Leading Ladies of Entertainment

Cultural offices
Preceded by Héctor Guzmán	Artistic Director, Orquesta Filarmónica de Jalisco; 2012–2013	Succeeded by Marco Parisotto
Preceded by Marzena Diakun	Principal Conductor, Orquesta de la Comunidad de Madrid; 2024–present	Succeeded by incumbent
