= Ana Martín =

Mexican actress and beauty pageant titleholder

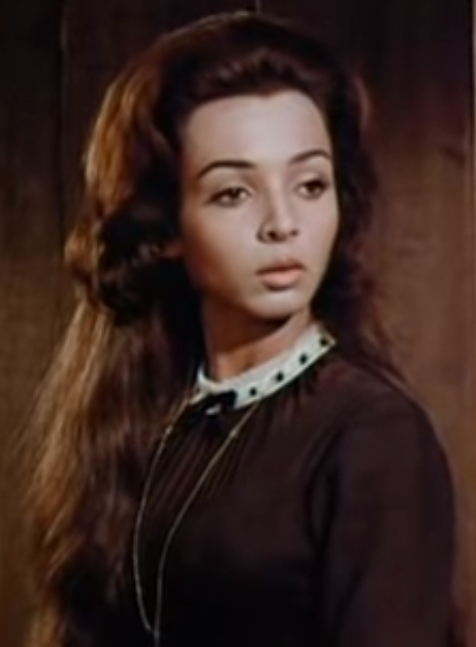
- Martín in Return of the Gunfighter (1967)
- Born: Ana Beatriz Martínez Solórzano; 14 May 1946 (age 80); Mexico City, Mexico
- Occupations: Actress; singer
- Years active: 1963–present
- Title: Miss Mexico 1963

Ana Beatriz Martínez Solórzano (born 14 May 1946), known professionally as Ana Martín, is a Mexican actress, and beauty pageant titleholder. She won the Miss Mexico 1963. which took her to compete in Miss World 1963 in London. Since 1965 she has appeared in numerous telenovelas and films.

== Early life and career ==
Born Ana Beatriz Martínez Solórzano to comedian Jesús Martínez "Palillo" and Nicaraguan Hilda Solórzano, Martín became known to the public in the first half of the 1960s after winning the title of Miss Mexico and starring in popular movies alongside actors including César Costa and Fernando Luján, as well as American stars Robert Taylor and Chad Everett (in Return of the Gunfighter).

After playing supporting roles in various telenovelas, Martín won her first leading role as Laura in Muchacha de barrio in 1979. That same year, she played the leading role in La llama de tu amor.

In 1982, she starred in the successful Gabriel y Gabriela, in which she played a young woman trying to pass as a man.

After La pasión de Isabela in 1984 and El pecado de Oyuki in 1986, Martín largely retired from the public view. In 1996, she returned to acting, with credits in telenovelas such as Alma Rebelde, Amor Real, Rubí, La Madrastra, Duelo de Pasiones, Un gancho al corazon, Mañana es para siempre, Soy Tu Dueña, La que no podia amar and Amores verdaderos. In 2009 she made a small appearance in Los exitosos Pérez alongside Jaime Camil, Ludwika Paleta, Rogelio Guerra, Verónica Castro and José Ron.

== Filmography ==
Telenovelas, series, films
Year	Title	Role	Notes
2025	Amanecer	Juliana Alameda	Guest star
2025	A.mar, donde el amor teje sus redes	Mercedes	
2023	Golpe de suerte	Domitila	Guest role
2022	Corazón guerrero	Conchita García	Supporting role
2021	La desalmada	Francisca "Panchita" Pérez	Supporting role
2021	La mexicana y el güero	Antonia "Toñita"	Guest role
2019-2020	Los pecados de Bárbara	Inés Fernández Vda. De Porrero	Supporting role
2017-2018	Sin tu mirada	Angustias Galvéz	Supporting role
2015-2016	Simplemente María	Felicitas Nuñez Vda. de Cervantes "Feli"	Supporting role
2013	Canela	Doña Tere	Protagonist
2013-14	Por siempre mi amor	Maria "Tita" Alverde Vda. de Escudero	Co-protagonist
2012	Amores Verdaderos	Candelaria Corona	Supporting role
2011-12	La que no podia amar	Maria Gomez	Co-protagonist
2010	Soy tu dueña	Benita Garrido	Supporting role
2009–2010	Los Exitosos Pérez	Renata Mansilla de la Cruz "Rosa"	Guest role
2008	Un gancho al corazón	Nieves Ochoa	Supporting role
2009	Mañana es para siempre	Refugio Rosario	Guest role
2008	La rosa de Guadalupe	Yoya	TV series
2007	Destilando Amor	Clara 'Clarita' Hernández García	Co-protagonist
2006	Duelo de pasiones	Luba López	Antagonist
2005	La madrastra	Socorro de Montes	Supporting role
2005	Me han destrozado la vida		Film
2005	Molinos de viento	Interviews	Film
2003-04	Amar otra vez	Yolanda Beltrán	Supporting role
2004	Rubí	Refugio Ochoa viuda de Pérez	Supporting role
2004	Las viudas		Film
2003	Amor real	Rosario Aranda	Co-protagonist
2002	Mujer, casos de la vida real		TV series
2001	Navidad sin fin	Teófila	TV series
2001	In the Time of the Butterflies	Mama	Film
2001	Corazones rotos	Celina	Film
2001	Atrévete a olvidarme	Sabina	Supporting role
1999	Alma rebelde	Clara Hernandez	Guest role
1998	Ángela	Delia Bellati Roldán	Antagonist
1998	Un boleto para soñar		Film
1997	Gente bien	Alicia Dumas de Klein	Antagonist
1996	Dulces compañías	Nora	Film
1996	La culpa	Cuquita Leon de Mendizábal	Supporting role
1988	El pecado de Oyuki	Oyuki Oguino	Protagonist
1983	La pasión de Isabela	Isabela	Protagonist
1982	Gabriel y Gabriela	Gabriela de Reyes/Gabriela Reyes/Gabriel	Protagonist
1981	Ángela Morante, ¿crimen o suicidio?	Rosa Solorzano	Film
1980	Vivir para amar	Marina	Film
1980	Verano salvaje		Film
1979	Cadena perpetua	Criada	Film
1979	Los indolentes	Rosa	Film
1979	Muchacha de barrio	Laura	Protagonist
1979	La llama de tu amor	Ana Cecilia	Protagonist
1978	Ratas del asfalto	Irene Mendoza	Film
1978	El lugar sin límites	La Japonesita	Film
1977	Mil caminos tiene la muerte	Claudia	Film
1976	El pacto	Teresa	Film
1975	Mundos opuestos	Mónica de la Mora	Antagonist
1975	El milagro de vivir	Jenny Gordon	Co-protagonist
1974	La mujer del diablo		Film
1974	El primer paso... de la mujer		Film
1973	El profeta Mimí	Rosita	Film
1973	Lágrimas de mi barrio		Film
1973	Mi primer amor	Baby	Supporting role
1972	Trio y cuarteto		Film
1972	Hoy he soñado con Dios	Rita Linares	Film
1972	Victoria		Film
1972	Tacos al carbón	Lupita	Film
1972	Fin de fiesta	Raquel	Film
1972	Trampa mortal		Film
1971	En esta cama nadie duerme		Film
1971	Siempre hay una primera vez	Rosa	Film
1971	Los corrompidos	Luz Maria	Film
1970	La rebelion de las hijas		Film
1970	¿Por qué nací mujer?	Santa	Film
1970	Faltas a la moral	Consuelo "Chelo" Godínez	Film
1969	El golfo		Film
1969	Romance sobre ruedas		Film
1969	Tú eres mi destino		
1968	Blue Demon contra las diabólicas		Film
1968	Blue Demon contra cerebros infernales		Film
1968	Corona de lágrimas	Consuelito	Film
1967	Return of the Gunfighter	Anisa	Film
1967	La muerte es puntual		Film
1967	Acapulco a go-go	Rita	Film
1966	El ángel y yo		Film
1966	Marcelo y María		Film
1966	Pánico		Film
1965	El gángster		Film

=== Awards and nominations ===
==== Premios TVyNovelas ====
Year	Category	Telenovela	Result
1983	Best Lead Actress	Gabriel y Gabriela	Nominated
1985	Best Lead Actress	La pasión de Isabela	Nominated
1989	Best Lead Actress	El pecado de Oyuki	Nominated
2004	Best First Actress	Amor Real	Nominated
2005	Best Co-star Actress	Rubí	Won
2006	Best First Actress	La Madrastra	Nominated
2008	Best First Actress	Destilando Amor	Won
2011	Best First Actress	Soy tu dueña	Nominated
2014	Best First Actress	Amores Verdaderos	Won

Awards and achievements
Preceded by Mirna Dávila	Miss Mexico; 1963	Succeeded by Anel Noreña
