= Grupo Editorial Vid =

Mexican publishing company

Grupo Editorial Vid (also known as Vid or Mundo Vid) was a Mexican comic, manga and books publisher. It was funded in the early 1940s as Editorial Argumentos (EDAR). Many of their books were sold from around 30 pesos for comics up to 60 pesos for manga (approximately US$5–6). Both comics and manga were released monthly.

== Comics ==
In the mid 1990s, Vid started publishing Marvel Comics, DC Comics, and Image Comics, among others, as well as some independent titles. In 2005, when Televisa acquired the rights to publish Marvel titles they stopped selling it.

Marvel Comics:

- The Amazing Spider-Man
- Uncanny X-Men
- Ultimate Spider-Man
- Ultimate X-Men
- Avengers
- The Ultimates
- Secret Wars
- The Infinity Gauntlet
- Marvel Mangaverse
- Marvels

DC Comics:

- Superman
- Batman
- Wonder Woman
- Green Lantern
- The Flash
- Crisis on Infinite Earths
- Infinite Crisis
- Justice
- JLA
- Superman/Batman
- All-Star Superman
- All Star Batman & Robin, the Boy Wonder
- DC vs. Marvel
- JLA/Avengers
- Watchmen
- Wildcats
- 52

Image/Top Cow Productions:

- Spawn
- Hellspawn
- Savage Dragon
- Tomb Raider

Dark Horse Comics:

- Hellboy
- Frank Miller's 300
- Star Wars

Bongo Comics:

- The Simpsons

Mundo Vid:

- Memín Pinguín, the first comic published.
- El Pantera
- Lágrimas y Risas franchise (firstly known as Lágrimas, Risas y Amor). Many of its stories has been adapted as soap operas (telenovelas) by Televisa TV network.

== Manga and Manhwa published by Vid ==
Name	Publisher	Volumes released
A.I. Love You	Kodansha	8
Ai Yori Aoshi	Hakusensha	17
Angel Sanctuary	Hakusensha	20
Angelic Layer	Kadokawa Shoten	5
Beyblade	Shogakukan	12
Black Lagoon	Shogakukan	9
Bleach	Shueisha	24
Blood: The Last Vampire 2000	Kadokawa Shoten	1
B't X	Kadokawa Shoten	16
Call Me Princess	Jitsugyo no Nihon Sha	1
Chobits	Kodansha	8
Chrono Crusade (as Chrno Crusade)	Kadokawa Shoten	8
Clamp School Detectives	Kadokawa Shoten	3
Claymore	Shueisha	8
Clover	Kodansha	4
Cowboy Bebop	Kadokawa Shoten	3
D.Gray-man	Shueisha	13
Death Note	Shueisha	13
DNA²	Shueisha	5
D.N.Angel	Kadokawa Shoten	11
Dragon Ball	Shueisha	42
Dragon Quest	Shueisha	37
Duklyon: Clamp School Defenders	Kadokawa Shoten	2
Elfen Lied	Shueisha	12
Fruits Basket	Hakusensha	23
Full Metal Panic!	Kadokawa Shoten	9
Full Moon o Sagashite (as Full Moon)	Shueisha	6
Gantz	Shueisha	17
Gravitation	Gentosha	12
Great Teacher Onizuka	Kodansha	25
Gunsmith Cats	Kodansha	9
I"s	Shueisha	15
Strawberry 100%	Shueisha	19
Inuyasha	Shogakukan	22
Kajika	Shueisha	1
Kare Kano	Hakusensha	21
Kirara	Shueisha	6
Love Hina	Kodansha	14
Lovely Complex	Shueisha	8
Marmalade Boy	Shueisha	8
Meteor Strike	Shueisha	1
Miyuki-chan in Wonderland	Kadokawa Shoten	1
Monster	Shogakukan	18
Nana	Shueisha	16
Naruto	Shueisha	24
Neon Genesis Evangelion	Kadokawa Shoten	10
Neon Genesis Evangelion: Angelic Days	Kadokawa Shoten	6
Oh My Goddess!	Kodansha	32
Psycho Trader Chinami	Shogakukan	2
Ragnarok	Daewon C.I.	10
RahXephon	Shogakukan	5
Robotech	Harmony Gold USA	1
Robotech: Prelude to the Shadow Chronicles	Harmony Gold USA	1
RG Veda	Shinshokan	10
Rurouni Kenshin (as Samurai X)	Shueisha	28
Saikano	Shogakukan	7
Sailor Moon	Kodansha	18
Saint Seiya	Shueisha	28
Sand Land	Shueisha	1
Shadow Lady	Shueisha	3
Shaman King	Shueisha	32
Slam Dunk	Shueisha	15
Slayers	Fujimi Shobo	8
Tenjho Tenge	Shueisha	17
Tokyo Babylon	Shinshokan	7
Tsubasa: Reservoir Chronicle	Kodansha	13
Video Girl Ai	Shueisha	15
Wish	Kadokawa Shoten	4
X-1999	Kadokawa Shoten	18
xxxHolic	Kodansha	8
YuYu Hakusho	Shueisha	15
Yu-Gi-Oh!	Shueisha	
Zetman	Shueisha	8
