= Encrucijada (TV series) =

- Genre: Telenovela
- Country of origin: Mexico
- Original language: Spanish

Original release
- Network: Telesistema Mexicano
- Release: 1970

Encrucijada (English title:Crossroads) is a Mexican telenovela produced by Televisa and transmitted by Telesistema Mexicano in 1970.

== Cast ==
- Irán Eory as Susan Harrison
- Jacqueline Andere as Wendy Kepler
- Enrique Aguilar as Fred
- Liliana Durán as Lidia
- Queta Lavat
- Ruben Rojo
