= Gabriel y Gabriela =

Television series

- Genre: Telenovela; Romance; Drama
- Created by: Yolanda Vargas Dulché
- Written by: Yolanda Vargas Dulché
- Directed by: Carlos Téllez
- Starring: Ana Martín; Jorge Rivero; Jorge Martínez de Hoyos; Liliana Abud; Rafael Baledón
- Theme music composer: Bebu Silvetti
- Opening theme: Dulce amor by Ana Martín
- Country of origin: Mexico
- Original language: Spanish
- No. of episodes: 124

Production
- Executive producer: Patricia Lozano
- Cinematography: Carlos Velazquez
- Running time: 21-22 minutes
- Production company: Televisa

Original release
- Network: Canal de las Estrellas
- Release: August 31, 1982 – February 21, 1983

Related
- El derecho de nacer (1981); El maleficio

Gabriel y Gabriela is a Mexican telenovela produced by Patricia Lozano for Televisa in 1982. It starred by Ana Martín, Jorge Rivero, Jorge Martínez de Hoyos and Liliana Abud.

== Plot ==
The first part of the story takes place in the 1960s. It is the love story between Gabriela and Renato. The viewers will witness their marriage, the birth of their daughter, Gabriela, and Renato's death by Nicando's hand. The second part takes place in 1980's, Gabriela now an adult. She has a rebellious personality and she pretends to be a man in order to sail on a boat. She is later courted by two men: Carlos and Fernando. At the end it is unclear whom she marries, because the viewers only see a hand that receives her at the altar.

== Cast ==
- Ana Martín as Gabriel/Gabriela de Reyes (daughter)/Gabriela Reyes (mother)
- Jorge Rivero as Carlos Iturbide
- Jorge Martínez de Hoyos as Benito Reyes
- Liliana Abud as Martha
- Rafael Baledón as Raul
- Nadia Haro Oliva as Carolina Iturbide
- Pancho Muller as Gervasio
- Patricio Castillo as Marcos
- Beatriz Sheridan as Rita Rocafuerte de Reyes
- Juan Ferrara as Fernando
- Rodolfo Rodríguez as Fermin
- Patricia Arredondo as Serafina
- Juan Peláez as Leonardo
- Emoé de la Parra as Rocío Iturbide
- Kokin Li as Li
- Arturo Allegro as Chon
- Alberto Inzua as Official
- Patricia Thomas as Ivonne
- Alejandra Peniche as Nora
- Karmen Erpenbanch as Lupe
- Lourdes Munguía as Dora
- Lupita Pallás as Eduviges
- Rosa Maria Morales as Herlinda
- Scarlet Maceira as Margarita
- Luis Miranda as Andrés
- Cinthia Riveroll as Gloria
- Simone Brook as Evelia
- Alejandra Espejo as Silvia
- Roxana Chávez as Flora
- Jorge Fegan as Sr. Goizurieta
- Ivan Rene as Fernando
- Queta Carrasco as Brigida
- José Alonso as Renato Reyes
- Jorge Humberto Robles as Nicandro
- Lissette Flores as Gabrielita Reyes (5 years)
- Susana Barragán as Gabriela Reyes (9 years)
- Francisco del Toro as Roberto
- Alonso Echánove as José
- Armando Pacheco as Matías
- Marcial Salinas as Dionisio
- Odiseo Bichir as Ismael
- Paty Durán as Reina
- Rubén Calderón as Santiago
- Alejandro Tommasi
- Aurora Alonso as Manuela
- Alejandra Meyer as Isaura
- Lupita Sandoval
- Antonio Miguel as Rafael
- Liza Willert as Regina
- Alejandro Sevilla as Dr. Fuentes
- Jaime Brizi as Raúl
- Al Suárez as Oficial

== Awards ==
Year	Award	Category	Nominee	Result
1983	1st TVyNovelas Awards	Best Telenovela of the Year	Patricia Lozano	Nominated
1983	1st TVyNovelas Awards	Best Actress	Ana Martín	Nominated
1983	1st TVyNovelas Awards	Best Actor	Jorge Martínez de Hoyos	Won

== Trivia ==
This was the only Mexican telenovela dubbed in Cebuano and Hiligaynon languages in the Philippines, now of regionals played by GMA Iloilo, Cebu and Davao.
