= Lágrimas, Risas y Amor =

Romantic Mexican comic book

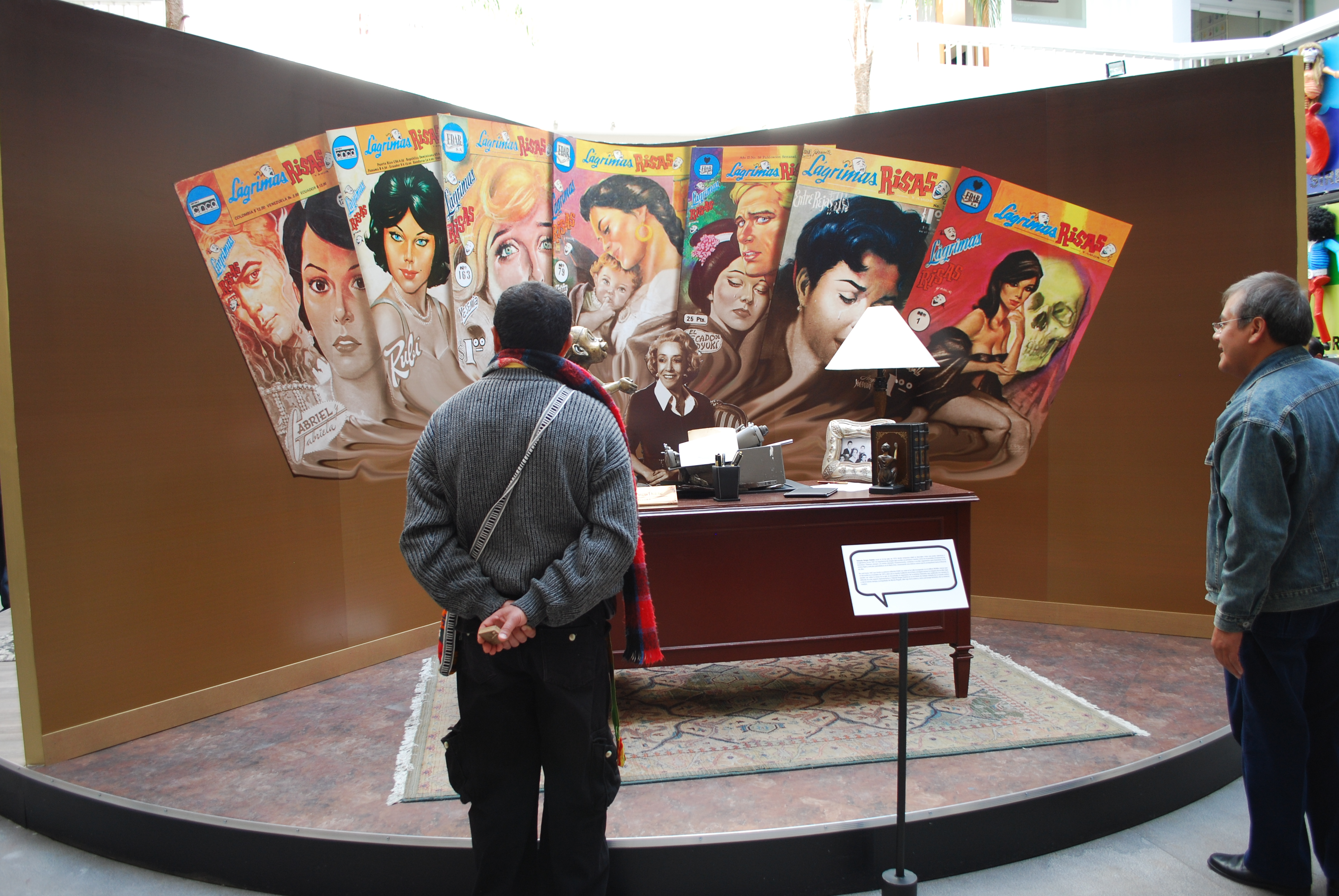
Lágrimas, Risas y Amor as part of a 2012 exhibition on Yolanda Vargas Dulché

Lágrimas, Risas y Amor (Tears, Laughter and Love) was a romantic Mexican comic book published by Editorial Argumentos (EDAR), probably the most popular of its kind in Latin America and one of the most popular of all the media in Mexico. Many of the stories from their comics were adapted into film and television.
