= Comics in Mexico =

Mexican comics
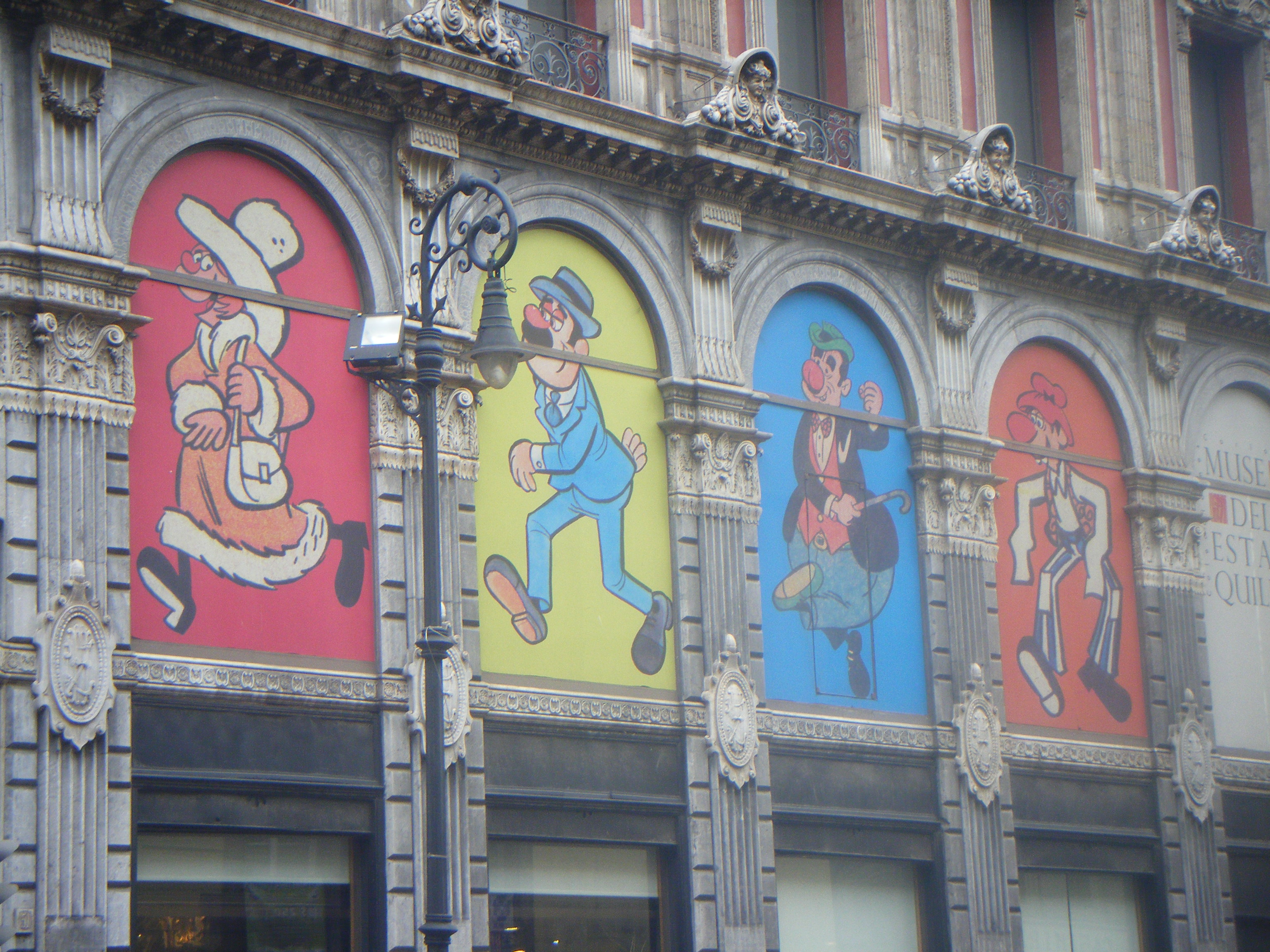
- Gabriel Vargas comic characters from La Familia Burrón. Museo del Estanquillo, Mexico City.
- Earliest publications: Late 19th century
- Creators: Gabriel Vargas
- Languages: Mexican Spanish

Comics culture in Mexico is far from being a modern phenomenon. Its roots may be traced back to many stages in Mexican history.

== Ancient history ==
Mexican intellectuals such as Ilan Stavans agree that centuries-old pre-Columbian codices and other ancient documents could be seen as primary sources of the comics culture in the country.

== Revolutionary times ==
Another important influence has been the work of José Guadalupe Posada whose satirical cartoons helped create a political identity of visual art. Political satire was quite a strong movement during the Porfiriato (1884–1911). Many newspapers became almost legendary because of their political comics and vignettes that were published during this era and during the subsequent Mexican Revolution (1910–1920).

As a result of the harsh government repression, the political cartoon ("caricatura política") practically became the only means of free expression in those turbulent years.

== The twenties, thirties and onward ==
The end of the Mexican Revolution marked the birth of a national comics industry that lasted many decades, with notable authors like Yolanda Vargas Dulché (founder of Grupo Editorial Vid), starring titles like Memín Pinguín, La Familia Burrón and Chanoc among many others.

From the 1930s through the 1970s, Mexico had a thriving comic-book industry with several diverse genres. Authors and artists like Gabriel Vargas, Germán Butze, Gaspar Bolaños, Oscar González Guerrero, José Angel Mora Suarez and Rius became famous with very original and diverse comic book series and titles such as Los Superlocos, La Familia Burrón, Adelita y Juan Sin Miedo, Pancho López, El Gran Caperuzo, Los Chiflados, Los del Doce, Sopa de Perico, Chanoc, Pepín, Fantomas, Kalimán, Rolando el Rabioso, El Payo, Hermelinda Linda, Los Supersabios, Los Supermachos, Los Agachados, Las Aventuras del Santo, Tinieblas, Blue Demon, El Tío Porfírio, Burrerías, Smog, Don Leocadio, Zor y los Invencibles, Las Aventuras de Capulina, Las Aventuras de Cepillín, El Monje Loco and Memín Penguín to name a few.

“Los Supermachos” treated social and political issues - suicide, tuberculosis, Marxism, for example - with humor and with innovative and varied graphics.

Most of these books sold millions of copies during this era, which has often been cited as "The Golden Age of Comic Books in Mexico".

Because of their success some comic book titles and their characters were even adapted into radio dramas and live action TV series and films during the 1960s and 1970s, among them Chanoc, Fantomas, Kalimán, Hermelinda Linda, Los Supermachos (in the 1974 film Calzonzin Inspector), Los Supersabios, El Santo, Tinieblas, Blue Demon, Capulina and Cepillín.

== The foreign sci-fi and fantasy boom ==
During the early eighties American superhero and sci-fi comics poured into Mexico. The cheaper costs of reprinting foreign titles combined with the perception that comics were only for kids, nearly wiped out indigenous comic books in the country. Las Aventuras de Parchís, El Pantera, El Hijo del Santo, Katy la Oruga, Timbiriche, Simón Simonazo, Video-Risa, Karmatron y los Transformables, Hombres y Heroes, Sensacional de Luchas, and Destrúktor el Defensor Cósmico were some of the very few titles produced locally to great demand. The only genre to survive, and even thrive, was a unique form of adult pulp comics.

In Mexico, adult comics go by a number of names, like "sensacionales" or "ghetto librettos." They are published in huge numbers as roughly square-shaped digests, about 96 pages long, in a realistic but uncomplicated "house" style. Most are sold cheaply at newsstands, either new or second-hand.

Sensacionales are known for their lurid subject matter, with stories and images that can get very gory or pornographic – or even a combination of the two. Typical titles include Bellas de Noche ("Ladies of the Night") or Relatos de Presidio ("Stockade Tales").

== The Asian invasion ==
In the 1990s the Mexican comics industry began to be revived, importing again USA heroes comics and some national ones like Ultrapato, Tinieblas, Son of the Night and Penumbra. The national industry went through many inner problems getting almost killed again. The only survivors went to magazines or newspapers mainly as comic strips but not as individual autonomous issues. The most popular, like El Cerdotado or Buba have managed to get anthologies of their strips. In this decade, imported and translated original Japanese manga also began to arrive with titles like Dragon Ball and Video Girl Ai, which started a very successful trend of Spanish translated Japanese manga that has continued until recent times.

== Modern times ==
In the last years, with the immense popularity of manga across the world, the Mexican comic industry seems to getting back on track with Editorial Toukan (whose whereabouts are uncertain at the moment) and Editorial Vid publishing, along with some USA comics, many new manga titles translated into Spanish. Manga has been one of the comic genres with the more growth in the last years.

In recent Mexican comics the political satire is still quite strong and there are some attempts of new independent comics like Zeraky, El Bulbo, Caballo Negro, El Arsenal, Rebelde, Meteorix 5.9 and Goji: Un Dragón con Ángel as well as the revival of older titles like Santo: La Leyenda de Plata, Blue Demon Jr.: El Legado, Tinieblas and Karmatron.

Other more recent comic strips that have found some unusual success thanks to the relatively new technology of social networks to promote themselves (in Twitter and Facebook respectively) have been the titles Cindy La Regia (2004) by Ricardo Cucamonga and Jours de Papier (2013).

== See also ==
- Gabriel Vargas (cartoonist)
- Germán Butze
- Rius
- Calzonzin Inspector
- Oswaldo Sagástegui
- Paco Calderón
- Trino Camacho
- Manuel Falcón
- Jis
- Kalimán
- Gaspar Bolaños
- José Cruz (editor)
- José Angel Mora Suarez - Artist and creator of Chanoc
- Oscar González Guerrero
- Oscar González Loyo
- Karmatron
- Nicanor Peña Cabrera - Artist of Destrúktor el Defensor Cósmico
- ¡Ka-Boom! Estudio
- Jesús Morales (Moraliux) - Artist and creator of Simón Simonazo and Video-Risa
- Ultrapato
- Oscar Alvarado
- Cerdotado
- Rebelde
- El Arsenal
