= Óscar González =

Óscar González, Oscar González or Oscar Gonzáles may refer to:

- Óscar González (Chilean footballer) (1894–1959), Chilean football midfielder
- Óscar González (racing driver) (1923–2006), Uruguayan racing driver
- Oscar González Guerrero (1926–2017), Mexican comic book artist
- Óscar González-Quevedo (1930–2019), Spanish Jesuit priest
- Oscar González Robles (born 1935), Chilean politician
- Oscar González Oro (1951–2026), Argentine broadcast journalist
- Óscar González Rodríguez (born 1951), Mexican politician (state of Aguascalientes)
- Oscar González Loyo (born 1959), Mexican comic book artist
- Óscar González Yáñez (born 1964), Mexican politician (state of Mexico)
- Óscar González (decathlete) (born 1976), decathlete from Spain
- Óscar González (Spanish footballer) (born 1982), Spanish footballer for Real Valladolid
- Óscar González (boxer) (1990–2014), Mexican boxer
- Óscar González (Venezuelan footballer) (born 1992), Venezuelan footballer
- Oscar González (baseball) (born 1998), Dominican baseball player
- Oscar Gonzáles (writer), author and poet from Honduras
- Oscar Gonzales (table tennis), Argentine table tennis player
