= La Lagunilla Market =

Market in Mexico City

Coordinates: 19°26′34.95″N 99°8′10.38″W

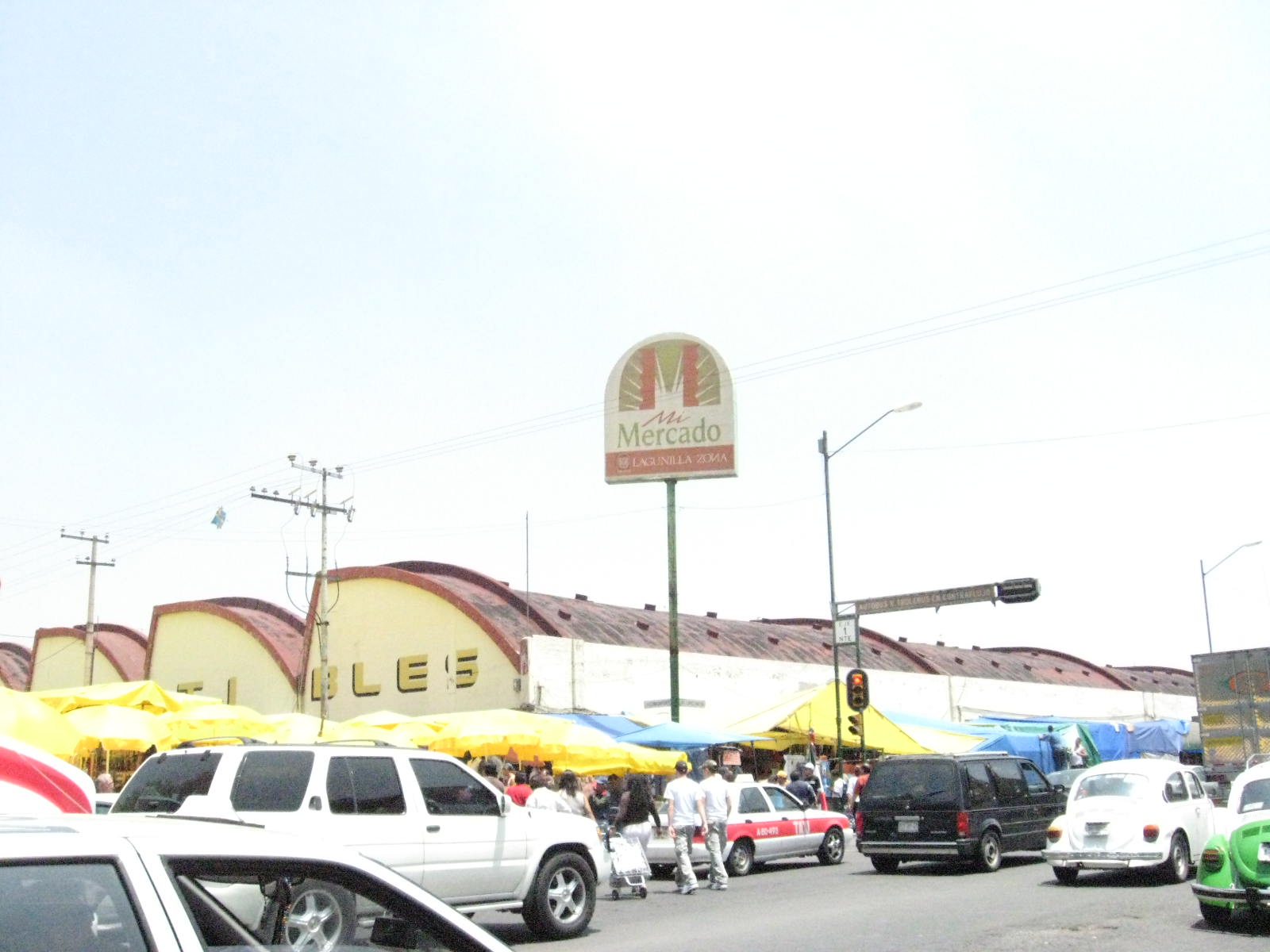
View of one of the buildings of the fixed market

La Lagunilla Market is a traditional public market in Mexico City, located about ten blocks north of the city's main plaza, in a neighborhood called La Lagunilla. The market is one of the largest in the city and consists of three sections: one for clothing, one for furniture and one for foodstuffs, mostly selling to lower income customers. The market is surrounded by small stores and street vendors, many specializing in furniture and dresses and other needs for formal occasions. On Sundays, the number of street vendors grows significantly, a weekly “tianguis” market called a baratillo which traditionally sells used items. One section of this baratillo has developed into a market for antiques, which has attracted higher income customers and even famous ones such as Carlos Monsiváis.

== Main market ==
La Lagunilla is one of Mexico City's largest markets, and the term usually refers to both the fixed buildings of the market proper and its associated tianguis or street market. This tianguis is officially on Sunday, but in reality, there are street vendors around this market all week, who extend and merge into the neighboring Tepito tianguis. The market straddles a major east west road called Eje 1 North, also called Rayón, in Colonia Morelos, about ten blocks north of the Zocalo, just outside the historic center of the city.

The market is located in the La Lagunilla barrio (informal neighborhood), next to the Santa Catarina Church. The plaza of this church was the site of area's main outdoor market or tianguis, through the colonial period to the late 19th century. Other landmarks nearby include the Guelatao Sports Center, and Plaza Garibaldi just to the west, known for its mariachis. The area is a lower socioeconomic one and most of the market's clientele are from this and similar areas. This market is always very crowded and very lively, especially those areas that sell food, clothing and other everyday items. The neighborhood has a dangerous reputation, but the market area is considered to be safe enough if visitors take basic precautions. About 2,000 families depend on this market directly or indirectly, but it faces pressure from commercial plazas and pressure from imports from Asia and other mass-produced items. Many of the vendors are third generation at the market, but many have been forced to change the merchandise they sell or complement their traditional wares in order to stay in business.

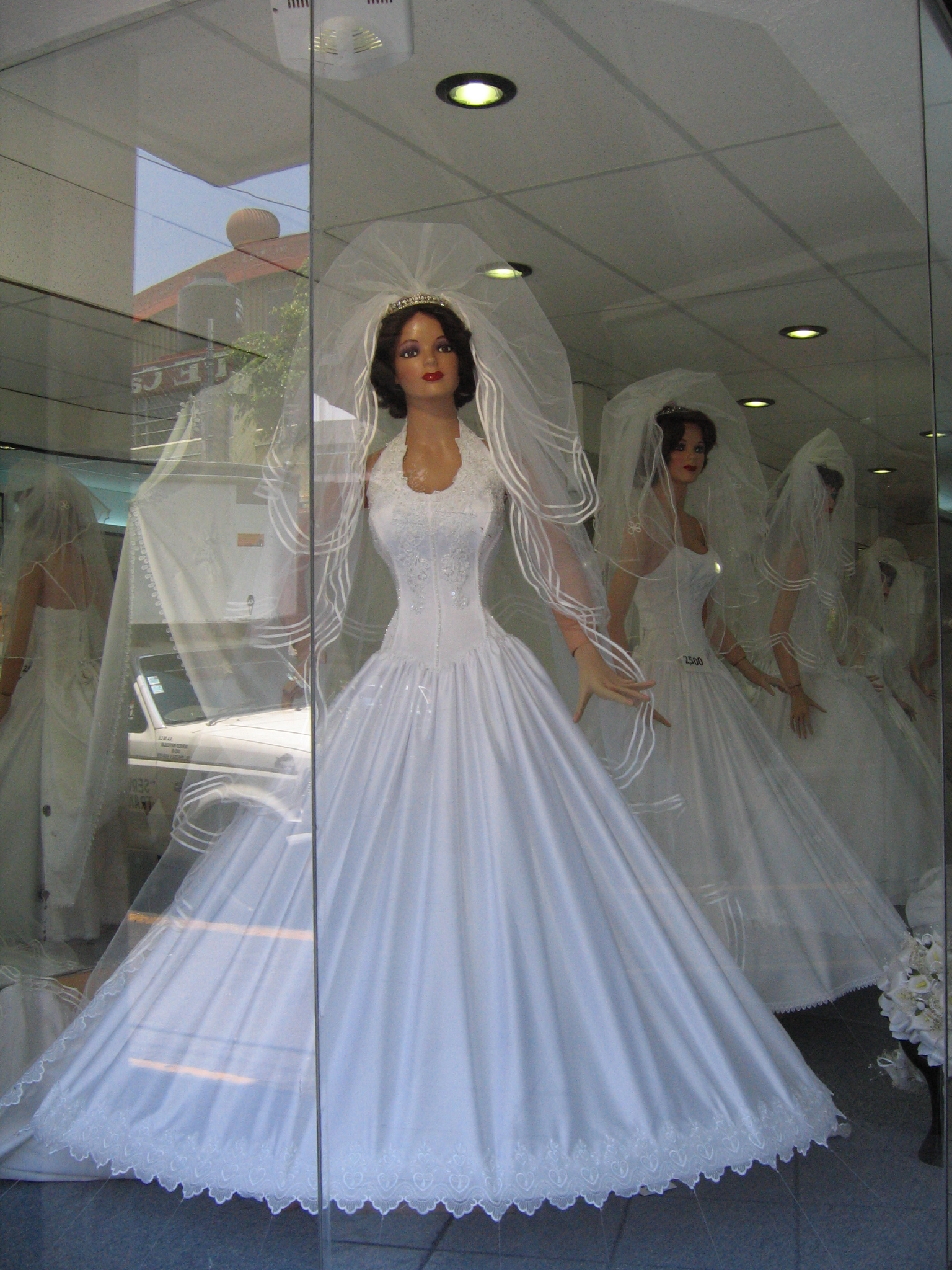
Window of a bridal shop in La Lagunilla

Essentially, the entire Lagunilla neighborhood is commercial, and has been since Aztec times. It and neighboring Tepito have been the focus of a number of films, televisions series and other artistic creations as it is considered to be iconic of Mexico City's lower classes. One feature film focused on this area was “Lagunilla, mi barrio” and a telenovela called Lagunilla was in production in the 1990s. Eugenio Derbez is a television producer who specializes in creating series based on the real life of ordinary Mexicans. He has sent actors and actresses to do “field study” in Lagunilla and other markets to learn how to imitate correctly the vocabulary and accents of the people they will portray. The market area was the subject of a late 1990s exhibition of black and white photographs taken by Manuel Alvarez B. Martinez in the 1960s and 1970s. La Lagunilla is one of the city's loudest areas. The sound level in the market can be deafening, with the sounds of street vendors arguing police sirens, honking cars and blaring music from many of the stalls selling music and DVDs. In 2006, the city passed a law to impose decibel limits, but most residents felt it was futile.

The fixed market proper consists of three buildings, two larger ones on the south side of Eje 1 Norte and one smaller one on the north side. Building One has one thousand stands, and mostly focuses on new clothing and fashion. However, this area is greatly expanded by street vendors on Sundays, which add other items such as vintage clothing to the offerings. Building Two has 579 stands, 120 vendors and is dedicated to furniture and home décor. Furniture sold includes bedroom sets, bathroom appliances, kitchen cabinets, desks, dining sets, cribs, and much more. Much of the offering is rustic or minimalist ins style, with some modern designs. Much of the furniture sold at the market is made by the vendors themselves. On the streets surrounding this building, such as Allende, Ecuador, Paraguay and Honduras, there are a number of furniture stores as well as street vendors, which usually sell unfinished or rustic furniture and home items. It has had famous customers such as Antonio Aguilar, Sr., Yuri and Irma Serrano, as well as legislators and government officials as clients. However, the furniture market is better known to older generations than younger, with many preferring to buy furniture at upscale stores, even though prices are up to seventy percent higher. The furniture building contains various types of furniture from rustic to minimalist to modern. To help preserve and promote the furniture market, there is a Feria de Mueble (Furniture Fair) held each year in May. The fair features the local merchants but outside craftsmen are also invited. The fair includes exhibits by young furniture designers who are known for minimalist and modern designs as well as traditional ones. The fair is partially sponsored by the Autoridad y el Fideicomiso del Centro Histórico as part of conservation efforts. Building three is in a smaller building on the north side of Eje 1 Norte. It has 319 stands and mostly sells produce and other food items.

Another attraction of the market is that it is surrounded by a number of small specialty shops and many street vendors. Most of the specialty shops are furniture stores or those related to items for formal occasions, such as weddings and quinceañeras. Most sell women's dresses in fantasy and princess styles for these events, as well as baptisms, presentations and many more, but there are also shops dedicated to elaborate decorations and party favors (either made or supplies to be made) along with some related services such as photography. Most of these stores are located on Honduras, Allende and Chile Streets with some in Building 2 on the south side.

Street vendors crowd Eje 1 North and the side streets on either side in both the La Lagunilla and Tepito neighborhoods. Those closest to the fixed market buildings often sell items similar to that which is inside, and those located near the formal occasion shops emulate these as well. This informal market has grown such that vendors with stalls and vehicles now routinely block several of the main avenue's six lanes. The problem begins from Comonfort Street, two blocks from Paseo de la Reforma. Here, vendors have taken over the lane dedicated to buses, with stands selling clothing, food, unlicensed CDs and DVDs and more. In some side streets, traffic is cut in half and in the smallest, there is no passage of vehicular traffic at all on weekends. In total, there are eleven city blocks severely affected by this. Cuauhtémoc borough authorities state that they do not have enough personnel to effect an eviction of the vendors. Earlier attempts to do this have resulted in threats to administration officials. Another issue is that many roving vendors sell beer and customers in the market proper can be seen drinking their purchases as they walk through the aisles. The most popular form of buying beer here is a “michelada” with a large bottle of beer (940ml) called a caguama emptied into a large cup and mixed with lime juice, salt and sometimes chili pepper and Worcestershire sauce. These vendors do not ask for proof of age. This informal market has made La Lagunilla one of the main centers for the production and sale of bootlegged CDs and DVDs.

== Sunday tianguis ==
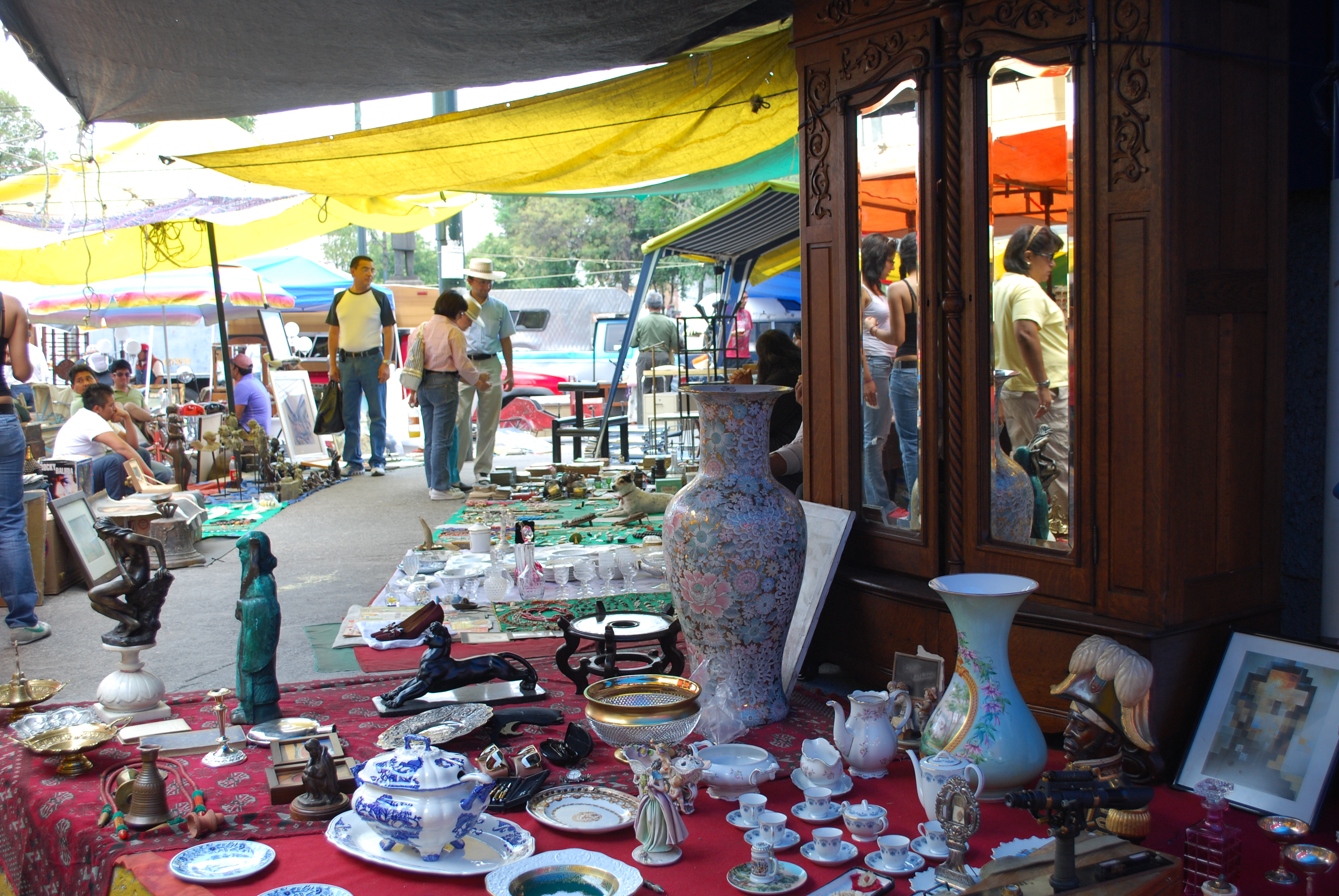
View of the Sunday antiques market at La Lagunilla

Although the fixed market is surrounded by street vendors everyday, on Sunday street vendors are more crowded and extend over the more blocks of the neighborhood. This event is called the tianguis day or mercado de pulgas (flea market), because it is based on the tradition of selling secondhand items, which is called “baratillo” (little cheap one). There are thousands of baratillo markets in Mexico City but the best known are Tepito, Santa Cruz Meyehualco, Santa Martha Acatitla and San Felipe de Jesús along with La Lagunilla. There is a popular saying in Mexico City that these markets “one can gather the pieces needed to build a helicopter.” These markets consist of a multitude of vendors selling parts of automobiles, televisions, bicycles, radios, computers, refrigerators, toys, stoves, clothes, shoes, chips, hens, turkeys, fighting cocks in various colors and more.

Shopping on this day begin very early as this is when there is the best selection. However, not all of the vendors on Sunday sell second hand items. Building One, the clothing section, is expanded by vendors who also sell clothes. While there is a notable presence of vintage clothing sellers on this day, most sell new and current fashions, many knock-offs of major designers. Stalls change merchandise frequently and currents modes of fashion can easily be seen from these stalls. One example was the proliferation of Indian style clothing which was popular in the mid 2000s in the city. There are also vendors selling other things related to fashion, such as henna tattoos and custom fingernail work.

The main distinction between the La Lagunila baratillo and others is that a section of it has developed into an antiques market. This section is centered on Comonfort Street and attracts collectors and tourists from both Mexico and abroad. It is the best known of a number of antiques markets including Mercardo Cuauhtemoc, Mercado de Alvaro Obregon and Plaza del Angel in Mexico City along with Callejón del Sapo in Puebla and El Baratillo in Guadalajara. The antiques market is one of the most traditional in Mexico City as interaction between seller and buyer is intense and personal. Good bargainers can get discounts of as much as thirty percent. As part of selling, many vendors will relate stories about the pieces, which may or may not be true. The market has attracted some foreign buyers and sellers and with the Internet and other sources of information, most sellers are more aware of the prices their items can fetch. In the past, this antiques market was known as cheap, but that is not true anymore.

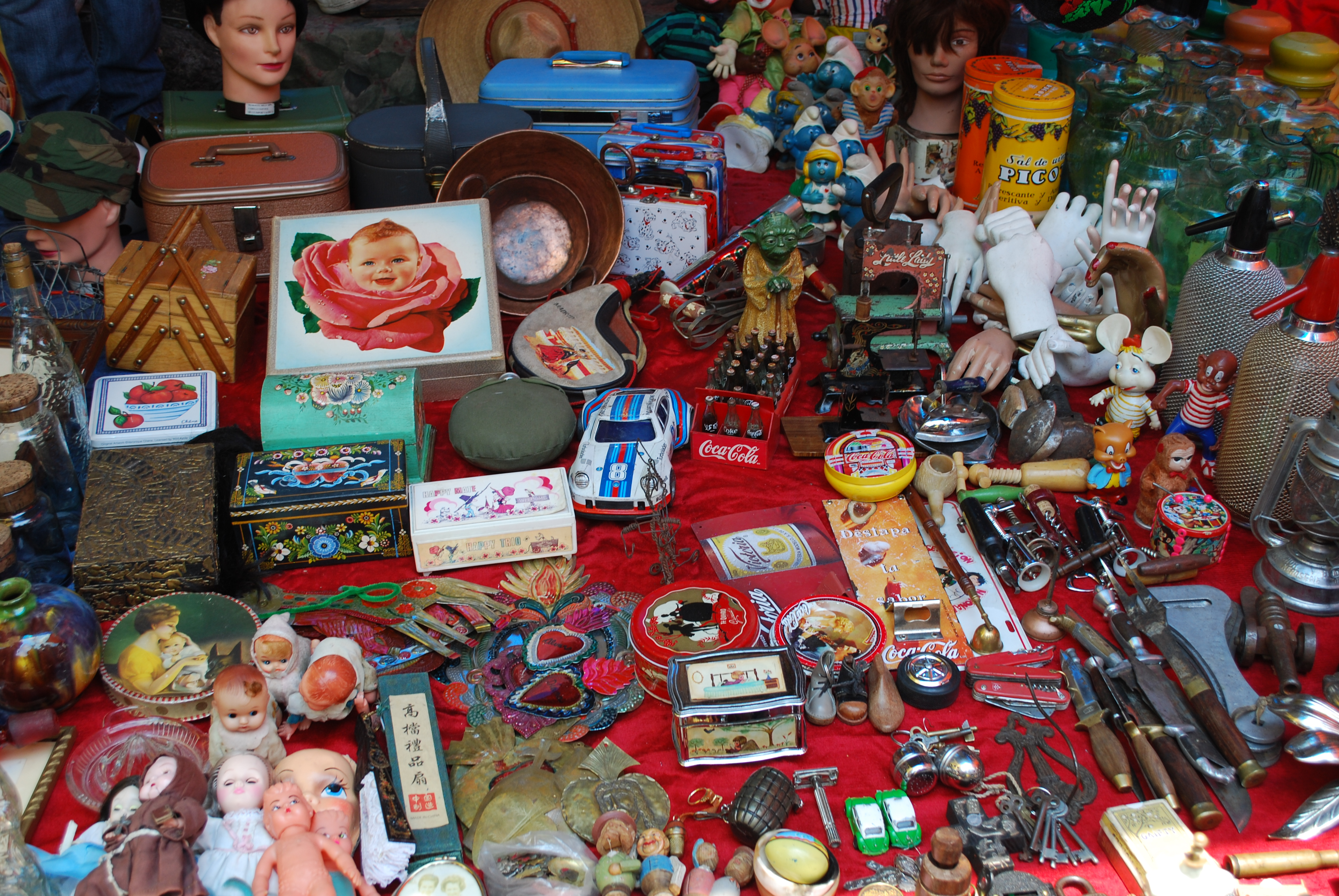
Some of the collectibles sold at the market

The types of antiques and collectibles sold is vast, but some of the most common include books, magazines, coins, toys, handcrafts and furniture. However, other finds include silverware, movie posters, jewelry, photographs, LP records, watches, cameras, 19th century brass beds, appliances and musical instruments. (mood163-164) While they can still be found today, one of the objects more often sold in the past in the market was pre Hispanic artifacts, especially in the 1940s. These objects have included those from the Mezcala, Colima, Nayarit, Chalco and Totonaca cultures, ranging from the pre Classic to the post Classic periods. One of the objects in greatest demand today is toys made of tin, which can sell in the United States for up to 1,000 dollars. Antiques merchants here have found that economic downturns do not affect their businesses very much. They also commented that knowledgeable American and Japanese collectors pay significantly more for many items, especially for items such as comic books and toys.

During the 20th century, this antiques market developed a following among many of Mexico City's wealthier residents and has boasted of a number of famous frequent customers. One was writer Juan José Arreola, who bought old books, sometimes as he sipped whisky from a glass. Another was engineer Guillermo González Camarena, who invented color television. He reputedly bought the components to build his first video camera here in 1934. Other shoppers in the antiques market have included Dr. Adam Corder, Jacobo Zabludovsky, Jesús Reyes Ferreira, Manuel Contreras, Eduardo Manzao and Ava Vargas. María Félix and Irma Serrano (La Tigresa) were known to buy and collect dolls here. Some of the markets most notable collector clients have included bookseller Carlos Ibarra, who amassed a collection of about 30,000 postcards, architect Jorge Zavala, noted for his restoration of historic monuments, bought books, masks, bottles, ceramics and crafts from the 19th and early 20th centuries. His collection of Mexican masks was amassed over twenty five years. Ava Vargas collected old photographs. German engineer Ernesto Richheimer was called the “Señor de las Cucharas” (Lord of the Spoons) because of is “incurable” affection for these utensils. He collected spoons over fifty years from markets all over the world. His collection of 2,300 pieces was displayed at the Museo Nacional de Historia and included samples from ancient times to the present and from all over the world.

One other major collector who was also famous was Carlos Monsiváis, who considered La Lagunilla one of his most important sources for his collections. During his first visit to La Lagunilla in 1968, Carlos Monsiváis found an old copy of La familia Burrón when no one thought this series by Gabriel Vargas was collectible. He was regularly found here and other markets in the city adding to his collection which eventually filled his house in the Portales neighborhood to overflowing. This collection was amassed over forty years and included stamps, postcards, scorecards, handcrafts by artisans such as Teresa Nava, Susana and Teodoro Torres, and Roberto Ruiz, photographs, popular toys, albums, calendars, comics, newspapers, notebooks and cookbooks. The Museo del Estanquillo, founded in 2006 to house his collection, contains about 20,000 objects acquired over thirty years.

The market has also had famous sellers, such as Ignacio Contreras (better known as “El Chacharitas”) who was noted among collectors as able to obtain all kinds of valuable objects at elevated prices. However, those who knew how to bargain could obtain significant discounts. El Chacharitas states that the sale of antiques was a very good business in the past but less so now. Much of the reason is the degradation of the neighborhood and the invasion of those selling mass-produced, unlicensed and counterfeit merchandise. The antiques market also has been hurt by Mexico City mayor Marcelos Ebrard's decision to close roads in and around the historic center as well as Paseo de la Reforma to vehicular traffic on Sundays, the day this market operates. For some vendors, business is down by as much as sixty percent, as many upper class residents will not use public transportation to get to this market.

== History ==
The La Lagunilla market was established and named after the La Lagunilla neighborhood, just outside the historic center of Mexico City. In the pre Hispanic era, this land was a small lagoon, which connected to the larger Lake Texcoco. This lagoon was important as docks for barges bringing merchandise into the Tlatelolco market. The activities of ancient Aztec markets were commented upon by Bernal Díaz del Castillo and other conquistadors who marveled at their size and variety of merchandise. However, all Aztec markets were outdoors, consisting of stands set up by the vendors themselves and taken down at the end of the day. During the colonial period, the lagoon dried along with the rest of Lake Texcoco and only the name serves as a reminder of the area's former geography as “la lagunilla” means “the small lake.” The neighborhood of La Lagunilla was built over this dried lagoon. Originally, the neighborhood was filled with mansions for the upper classes. Many still remain, as they have never been replaced by more modern constructions. As the area's economy has been strongly linked to commerce since the Aztec era, evolution of the area into a lower-class neighborhood brought in large scale commerce.

The area had an important market in colonial times which was located at the plaza of the Santa Catarina Church. This church was founded in 1586. In 1640, it was converted from a monastery to a parish church. The current building on the site dates from 1740. The market held on its plaza was third in importance after the El Parían and El Volador during the colonial period. In 1833, a cholera outbreak spurred the abandonment of the area by wealthier residents and the area become lower class. The plaza remained crowded and important because of its proximity to the Royal Tobacco Factory.

La Lagunilla is the descendant of a type of market called the “baratillo” (lit. little cheap one), which specialized in handcrafts, secondhand items and foodstuffs for the poor. It is from this tradition of secondhand items that the antiques market evolved. The first market of this type was El Baratillo in the Zocalo in the 16th century. However, in 1609, the viceroy of New Spain banned this type of merchandise from the plaza, citing health and public security concerns. These vendors then went to other markets such as those in Tepito and La Lagunilla, where they remain to this day.

The area was reorganized into formal neighborhoods called “colonias” as Mexico City grew outside of its traditional confines in the latter 19th century. The new colonias were Santa María la Redonda, Guerrero and Santa María de la Ribera. The La Lagunilla market was created to replace the Santa Catarina tianguis, on lands next to it related to Callejón del Basilisco, the Plazuiela del Tequiesquite, Callejón de los Papas and 2a Calle de la Amargura. This first market was built between 1912 and 1913 as a series of wooden stalls with roofs by engineers Miguel Ángel de Quevedo and Ernesto Canseco. Initially, it was dedicated to the sale of produce, eggs and grains, with sections for domestic fowl and fish.

During the 20th century, the market absorbed merchants from the closure of markets located in and near the Zócalo, the main square of Mexico City. In addition to the vendors on the square itself, merchants came from the closing of the tianguis at the Plazuela del Factor (today the site of the House of the Legislative Assembly), the Plaza Villamil (today the site of the Blanquita Theatre) and the Mercado del Volador (today the site of the Supreme Court) . This caused overcrowding and chaos in the area, with most of the area impassable to traffic by the 1950s. The government decided to replace the wooden stalls with new, modern warehouse-type constructions consisting of three sections built by architect Pedro Ramírez Vázquez.

Like other traditional public markets in Mexico, La Laguinilla has struggled to remain solvent in the face of competition from chain stores and other more modern selling venues. However, it has withstood this competition better than many others of its kind in the city. In the late 2000s, the city has worked to renovate areas in and around Plaza Garibaldi, which includes some areas around the market. The focus of this project is to promote tourism to the area.
