= Rebelde (disambiguation) =

Rebelde is a 2004–2006 Mexican telenovela adapted from Rebelde Way.

Rebelde may refer to:

== Music ==
=== Albums ===
- Rebelde (album), a 2004 album by RBD
  - Rebelde (Edição Brasil), the 2004 Brazilian Portuguese version of the album
- Rebelde (soundtrack), a 2012 soundtrack album for the Brazilian soap opera
- La Rebelde, a 2005 album by Ninel Conde
- Rebelde, a 2002 album by Celso Piña
- Rebelde, a 1998 album by Rebeca
- Rebelde, a 1990 album by Jerry Rodriguez and Mercedes for SugarHill Recording Studios

=== Songs ===
- "Rebelde" (song), a song by RBD from Rebelde
- "La Rebelde", a song by Ninel Conde
- "Rebelde", a song by Hamlet

== Other uses ==
- Rebelde (comics), a 2006 comic book series based on the Mexican telenovela
- Rebelde (Brazilian TV series), a 2011–2012 Brazilian telenovela adapted from the Mexican telenovela
- Rebelde (2022 TV series), a Mexican series and sequel to the Mexican telenovela of the same name that premiered on Netflix in 2022
- Rebelde (Peruvian TV series), a 2025—2026 Peruvian series based on the Mexican telenovela of the same name from 2004
- Rebelde (videogame), a 2025 Nintendo Switch 2 videogame based on the 2004 Mexican telenovela of the same name

== See also ==
- Rebelde Way, an Argentine soap opera created by Cris Morena, 2002–2003
- Soy rebelde, a 1971 Spanish album by singer Jeanette
