= La Familia Burrón =

La familia Burron (The Burron Family)
- La Familia Burron characters
- First appearance: Superlocos (1948)
- Last appearance: La familia Burron (2009)
- Created by: Gabriel Vargas

In-universe information
- Species: Humans
- Nationality: Mexican

Print Publications
- Comic series: La familia Burron (1948 – 2009)

La Familia Burrón (The Burron Family) is a family of characters from Mexican comic books created in 1948 by Gabriel Vargas. 500,000 copies were printed during its 61 year run, making it one of the longest running publications in the world. The comic book series of the same name follows the adventures of a lower-class family from Mexico City with the surname Burrón (possibly a word play on "burro," meaning donkey, but is also Mexican slang for dunce, and "albur" Mexican wordplay involving double entendres). One of the main characteristics of The Burrón Family is their use of slang, contractions, or invented words in most dialogue.

== History ==
=== 1940s: Development and Creation ===
In the 1940s, Gabriel Vargas published a weekly comic titled Los Superlocos (Superweirdos), which several recurrent characters were featured. The comic focused on slice of life comedy stories, often satirizing the lives of the lower classes of Mexico. Jilemón Metralla y Bomba, an old retired Mexican cacique, was one of the most popular characters in the comic. The Burrons were born as a result of a bet between Vargas and Cuban screenwriter Fernando Ferrari, who challenged Vargas to create a female comic character that could be as successful and charismatic as Jilemón. Vargas accepted and presented the Burrons Family in the next issue of Superlocos in December 1948. The Burrons initially shared the comic with Jilemón, but the family become so popular that Vargas created an independent title for them nine months later. The comic book was initially titled Paquito, and the Burrons' adventures were featured under the title A dog's life, before it was later changed to La Familia Burrón.

=== 1948–present: Popularity ===
The comic was published from 1948 to 2009, with later comic and newspaper reprints. Since Vargas's death, the comic has been continued to be reprinted as paperbacks. Between 2011 and 2017, the complete comic collection was reprinted as 10 hardcover volumes. Because comics in Mexico were generally considered a low-class form of entertainment, La Familia Burrón was once cataloged as a political cartoon, and its author Gabriel Vargas as a satirical cartoonist.

== The Burrons Family ==
The Burrons are a typical lower-class family that lives in a neighborhood in Mexico City. The family members are Don Regino Burrón, who owns and operates a barbershop named "El Rizo de Oro" (The Golden Curly Hair), his wife Borola Tacuche, their teenage children, Macuca and Regino and the family pet, a dog named Wilson. Later in the series, the family adopts a young child named Foforito Cantarranas.

=== Doña Borola Tacuche de Burrón ===
Borola is the family boss and the main character. She was born to a wealthy and well known family in Mexico City. Since she was young, she would often get into trouble and put her friends in difficult situations, particularly Regino Burrón. She eventually fell in love with him, favoring her "chaparrín" (little short man) over a large number of wealthy suitors.

In spite of her age, Borola regards herself as an attractive woman. She often claims she was a famous theater actress. On more than one occasion, she went back to being a stripper, despite her friends believing that she's too old for the job. Being called old upsets her, and she argues that she is a "girl of the twenty first century." She explores various activities such as racing pilot, wrestling, medical surgeries, and engineering.

Borola attempts to get her family out of poverty through shady businesses without her husband's knowledge. She usually tries to help the other people living in poverty in her neighborhood, although she also often tries to take advantage of them. Borola is meant to represent the spirit and inventive nature of the Mexican.

Some of her inventions and projects include a wooden helicopter powered by a clothes washer motor, a cannon for traveling to space, a cable car, and a satellite built using a water container. In benefit of the "viejerio" (a derogative name for old people) and the dozens of "pirrimplines" (kids) that live in the neighborhood, she built an alternative subterranean transportation system to prevent her neighbors and their children from being run over when they try to cross the streets. Many of these adventures end with people being injured. The last episode led Borola to jail, but was quickly released thanks to her relations with members of the "tecolotiza" (a derogatory word for the police).

== Recurrent characters ==
Although the main characters of the comic are the members of the Burron family, entire comics were occasionally dedicated to recurrent secondary characters, similar in style to the 1950s Scrooge McDuck comics whose stories were independent but related to Donald Duck's Comics. The Burrons don't usually appear in these side stories.

=== Cristeta Tacuche ===
Borola's wealthy aunt. She was Borola's tutor when she was a kid, but later escaped from Mexico during President Echeverría's purges and moved to France. It is often mentioned that Rockefeller was one of her poor relatives.

=== Boba Licona ===
Cristeta's personal assistant. She's a minor character, but is always present wit Cristeta. Her name is a mash up of "Boba" (dunce) and "Licona", a Spanish surname. When both words are pronounced together, it forms the Mexican equivalent of "Dim Witt". Despite her name, she's an effective assistant that exceeds expectations. She has a close relation with her boss, similar to Batman's butler Alfred.

=== Ruperto Tacuche ===
He's Borola's younger brother, and is considered the most complex character in the comic. As a kid, he suffered an accident that burned his face. His family made plans for facial reconstruction, but he escaped from home when he was a teen, and become a thug. He never underwent treatment for his disfigurement. Eventually reformed and now working as professional baker, he becomes the guardian of his (now deceased) best friend and crime partner's paralytic son, Robertino, who sees him as a paternal figure. Ruperto develops feelings for Robertino's widowed mother, Bella, but they can't have an open relationship due to prejudices of the time (she's a widow, his an ex-con). At the end of the series, Bella accepts him, but refuses to live with him unless he agrees to marry her first.

=== Lucila Ballenato ===
Initially a minor character, she's Bella's antagonist and possible crime partner of Ruperto. She eventually joins the cast of the main characters and becomes Bella's close friend. Her brother Renato becomes a recurrent supporting character.

=== Susanito Cantarranas and La Divina Chuy ===
A homeless garbage catcher and biological father of Foforito, Borola's adopted son. He develops a relationship with a catcher woman named Chuy, who works as stripper, despite the fact she's not attractive and overweight, and eventually marries her. They share the same economical situation and are used to represent the most abandoned and poor social class in Mexico.

=== The Tinocos Family ===
The opposite of Susanito and Chuy, they are an extremely wealthy family composed by Titino, his wife and their son, Floro aka "The Truck". The comics usually focus on Floro being a selfish high school junior, with his father as support character. Floro's mother plays a minimal role, with the main focus of these stories usually being the tense relation between Tinoco and Floro and the mishandling of money.

=== Doña Gamucita Botello ===
She has no relationship or interaction with the other characters in the comic, except for living in the same block. She represents the selfless mother that gives everything for her son, a common Mexican stereotype of the time. She's a widow of advanced age who has a hippie son named Avelino Pilongano, who he insists he's a poet. He lives at his mother's expense.

=== Kakiko Kukufate from Karakatiako ===
An alien from Mars who occasionally comes to Earth to visit Borola to learn more about Earthlings. His name has no meaning and is a tongue twister made by joining many k phonemes. However, the pronunciation of his name sounds similar to many province locations in Mexico, which adds a touch of credibility to his name.

== Colloquial language ==
Gabriel Vargas has been recognized and praised for the use of language in Burron's comics. Using a combination of slang, popular expressions, Pre-hispanic terms, colloquial, contracted, and invented words mixed together, Vargas created a unique language in which almost every common word of our language has an equivalent in the Burron universe. Even insignificant details are described with this invented language. For example, the home of the family is placed in Mexico City, but in a fictitious location in "chorrocientos chochenta y chocho, Callejón del Cuajo". The number itself has no meaning in Spanish - the author uses word play using many Ch phonemes evoking large quantities (chorrocientos is a juxtaposition of "chorro" which means "lots" and "cientos" which means "hundreds") and a variation of the number 88 (ochenta y ocho). This means that the family lives somewhere in "many hundreds plus 88 Rennet Alley".

This also applies for parts of the body. For example, Vargas often used the expression "los de apipizca" instead of just using "eyes". Apipizca is an obscure reference to a migratory water bird whose eyes have the appearance of being irritated. Other unnecessarily long and complex phrases frequently used included "las de sopear" -the ones used to eat soup- instead of "hands" or "las de galopar" -the ones used to gallop- instead of "legs".

Professions, activities, street names, cities, vehicles, objects and animals are also described this way. Most characters have names that follows the same pattern. "Cantarranas" -Frogsinger-, "Boba Licona" -Dimwit-, "Gamucita Botello" -Lil'Bottled Suede - are a few examples of the kind of names, that can be found in the comic, though many have no real meaning. For their unusual use of the language, La Familia Burrón has been object of anthropological studies, essays and dissertations by several universities and language academies around the world.

== Public recognition ==
La Familia Burron is considered one of the most representative comics of Mexican popular culture of all time. It is often cited as a social chronicle of the decades from the 1950s to 1970s.

== Bibliography ==
- Vargas, Gabriel (2002–2006) La familia Burrón, 10 tomos con 12 ejemplares cada uno, Ed. Porrúa, México.
