= Santa María la Redonda =

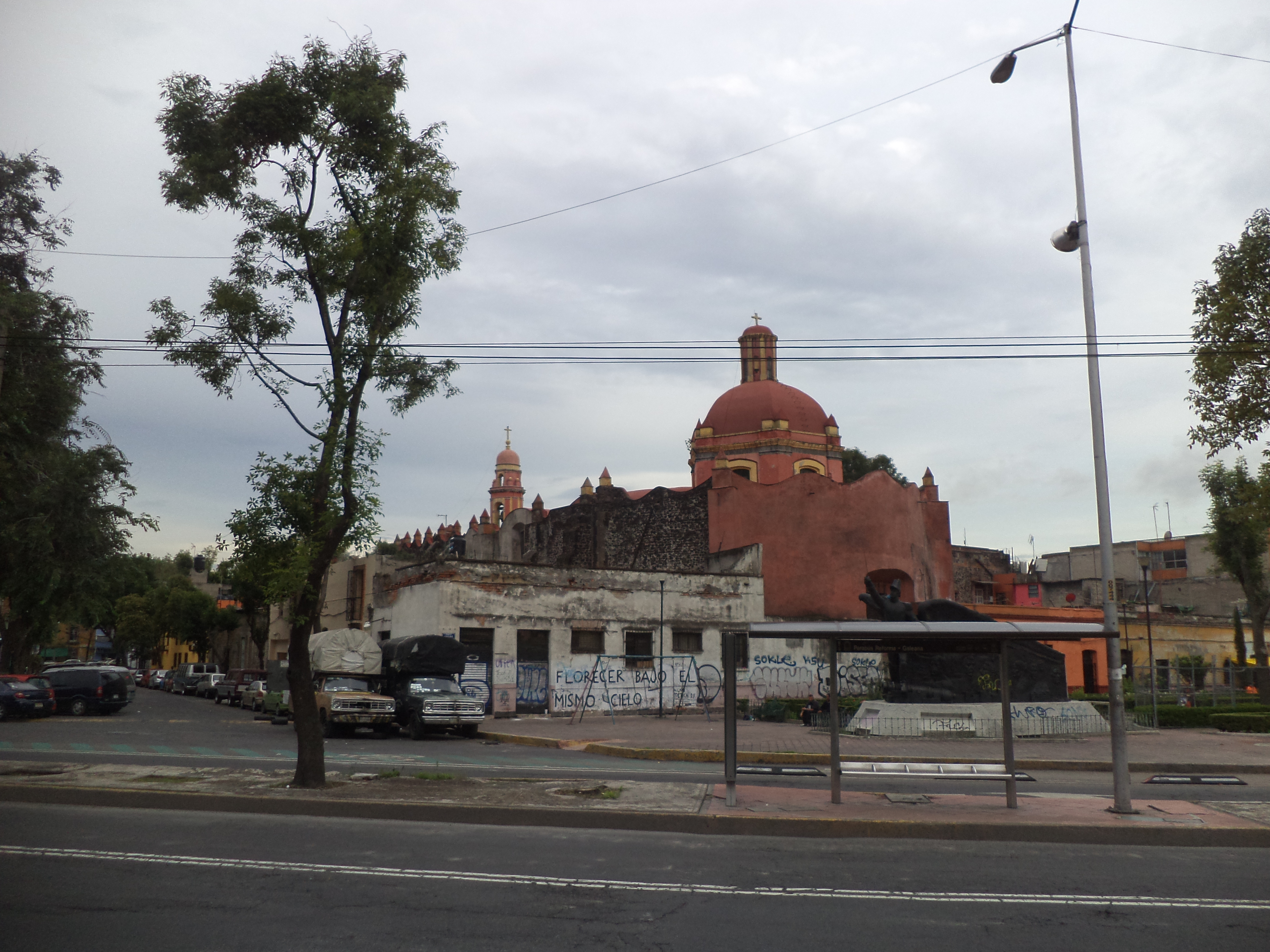

Santa María la Redonda is a traditional neighborhood located in the Cuauhtémoc municipality of Mexico City now part of colonia Guerrero close to Tepito and La Lagunilla. Even though it is not a formal colonia, Santa María la Redonda is a recognized and traditional zone formed after the Conquest of the Aztec Empire on one of the four original neighborhoods (campan) of Mexico-Tenochtitlan, Cuepopan-Tlaquechiuhca.

== Mesoamerican period ==
The current area of Santa María La Redonda was the Cuepopan-Tlaquechiuhca, one of the four campan or neighborhoods part of the original island of Mexico Tenochtitlan. As a campan the neighborhood has the right to have a main temple devoted to the area. This temple was located in the area that today is occupied by the Temple of Santa María la Redonda, established in 1524 by Pedro de Gante.
