= Rosa Maria Duran =

Spanish Catalan translator and teacher (1927–2026)

- Born: 1927; Barcelona, Spain
- Died: 6 September 2026 (aged 99); Mexico
- Relatives: El Fisgón (son)
- Awards: Creu de Sant Jordi (2022); Commander of the Ordre des Palmes académiques

Rosa Maria Duran i Gili (1927 – 6 September 2026) was a Spanish Catalan translator and teacher who, for over 60 years, promoted Catalan culture in Mexico. Born in 1927 in Barcelona, Duran and her family fled to France after the fall of Catalonia to Francoist forces in the Spanish Civil War. A few years later, when she was fifteen, her family moved again, this time to Mexico, where she remained for the rest of her life.

In addition to teaching Catalan culture, Duran worked as a translator and interpreter for the United Nations. In 2022, she was a recipient of the Creu de Sant Jordi in recognition of her cultural preservation work.

== Early life and move to Mexico ==
Duran was born in Barcelona in 1927, to Odón Durán Docón and Rosa Gili de Durán. Her father, Odón Durán, was a pro-democracy lawyer who worked as an attorney general in the Generalitat de Catalunya. She grew up speaking Catalan with her mother and Spanish with her father. As a child, her home was destroyed and her aunt killed when their house was bombed during the Spanish Civil War.

Her family was opposed to Franco. After the conquest of Catalonia by Francoist forces in 1939 at the end of the civil war, she and her family fled to Montpellier, France. A few years later, when she was fifteen, her family moved again, this time to Mexico. They were aided in their move by the Mexican diplomat Gilberto Bosques Saldívar.

In Mexico, Duran attended the National Autonomous University of Mexico, where she studied Hispanic literature. She then returned to France to study at Sorbonne University in Paris. As an adult, she settled in Mexico City.

== Activism and career ==
Duran began performing translation work in 1949, when assisting a group of American Quakers; in two years, she became a professional translator, translating between French and Catalan. She spent much of her career as a interpreter and translator for the United Nations. She was a recipient of the Ordre des Palmes académiques for teaching French, reaching the ranks of Knight, Officer, and Commander.

For over 60 years, Duran also promoted and taught Catalan culture; at the time of her death, she was recognized as leader within the Mexican Catalan community and Salvador Illa described her as "distinguished figure of the Catalana community in exile in Mexico" (Spanish: "figura destacada de la comunidad catalana en el exilio en México"). Her life story was featured in Milagro Martín Clavijo's 2025 book Memoria y exilio: Republicanas españolas en Hispanoamérica. For promoting Catalan culture, Duran was given the Josep Maria Batista i Roca Award and, in 2022, the Creu de Sant Jordi for her cultural preservation work as well as creating connections between Catalonia and Mexico.

== Personal life and death ==
In Mexico, Duran was a member of the Orfeó Català de Mèxic and an amateur theatre group. Her brother was the poet Manuel Duran i Gili and the cartoonist Rafael Barajas Durán, better known as El Fisgón, was her son.

Duran died in Mexico on 6 September 2026, at the age of 99.
