= Gabriel Vargas =

Gabriel Vargas may refer to:

- Gabriel Vargas (cartoonist) (1915–2010), Mexican cartoonist
- Gabriel Vargas (footballer, born 1983), Chilean footballer
- Gabriel Vargas (footballer, born 2000), Venezuelan footballer
- Gabriel Osorio Vargas, Chilean film producer

== See also ==
- Gabriel Vargas Santos Airport, airport in Columbia
- Gabriel Varga (born 1985), Canadian kickboxer
- Gabriela Vargas (born 1988), Paraguayan chess player
