= Calzonzin Inspector =

1974 film

- Film poster
- Directed by: Alfonso Arau
- Written by: Alfonso Arau
- Starring: Alfonso Arau
- Cinematography: Jorge Stahl Jr.
- Release date: 2 May 1974
- Running time: 90 minutes
- Country: Mexico
- Language: Spanish

Calzonzin Inspector is a 1974 Mexican comedy film and live action comic adaptation directed and starred by Alfonso Arau. It was selected as the Mexican entry for the Best Foreign Language Film at the 47th Academy Awards, but was not accepted as a nominee.

== Background ==
The film is based on the titular character from the famous Mexican comic book Los Supermachos created and drawn by Mexican cartoonist Rius, who co-wrote the screenplay. "Cazonci" or "Caltzontzin" was the term used in the Purépecha culture, to name their emperors. The film, which is influenced by Nikolai Gogol's The Government Inspector, centers around two poor Mexicans who are mistaken for government inspectors from Mexico City by the corrupt mayor of a small town. It is a humorous political critique, aimed squarely at the then ruling party Partido Revolucionario Institucional (PRI) and its paramilitary caciques, at a time when freedom of speech in politics was highly restricted. There are at least two versions of the film, with one having some scenes deleted by State censors, the most notable of which depicts the killing of a renegade farmer by a police officer, who shoots the farmer in the back. This is set in the modern day (the 1970s).

== Plot ==
When the mayor of a fictional town in rural Mexico learns that an incognito inspector is sent by the Government to supervise him, he tries in all the ways to intercept him in order to avoid him discovering his corrupt ways. Almost at the same time a poor Mexican guy, called Caltzontzin that looks like a beggar with a Mexican sarape, arrives to town and soon is confused with the aforementioned inspector.

Then the Mayor does all he can to try to show Caltzontzin that the town is running fine, since closing the local bar and putting in jail all his patrons, and using them for different purposes (like showing them in jail, then to play a soccer game in the local park and to even as bed them as the sick people in a hospital), making the students of a closed school to go back to attend classes, make a goofy representation of Adam and Eve in Paradise and making them to sing in front of the Inspector, through this backfires to the wife of the Mayor when she realizes that the pianist of the cantina made the children to sing "Aventurera" (a bolero song written by Agustin Lara about a prostitute).

Soon, the other inhabitants of the town do whatever they can to get the attention of Caltzontzin as long as they demand some help from him to put down the Mayor, making a colorful parade in front of his hotel and giving him some letters that probes the Major's corruption. Caltzontzin and his friend Chon confides to send the information to a reporter for a diary only to have his letter intercepted by the people from the Mail Office (concerned that this letter would go to the Governor) and soon the Major discovers Caltzontzin's true identity.

Caltzontzin is condemned to be tied and left to be killed by a bull during the town's bulls parade. However Chon manages to free him and using bullfighting tools manages to make a goofy but effective bullfighting game to keep them alive, until, when trying to kill the bull with the estoque they unexpectedly touch a dynamite detonator left by the Major oppositors making the arena to blow in pieces, while Caltzontzin leaves the town literally flying, the real Inspector arrives to town to encounter a dismayed and shocked Mayor, along with his people, pledging for help.

== Cast ==
- Alfonso Arau as Caltzontzin
- Arturo Alegro as Caltzonzin's friend
- Pancho Córdoba as The Major
- Virma González as Enedina
- Héctor Ortega as Periodista
- Carmen Salinas as Doña Eme
- Carolina Barret as Doña Pomposa
- Mario García 'Harapos' as Lechuzo

== See also ==
- List of submissions to the 47th Academy Awards for Best Foreign Language Film
- List of Mexican submissions for the Academy Award for Best Foreign Language Film
- Comics in Mexico
