= Los unos y los otros =

Argentine talk show

Los unos y los otros (Spanish: This and that people) is an Argentine talk show TV program. It was hosted by Andrea Politti from 2011 to 2013 and Oscar González Oro since 2014, and aired by América TV since 2009.

== Awards ==
- 2013 Martín Fierro Awards: Best female TV host
