= Karmatron =

Karmatrón
- Design of the titular character for the 2002 reboot of Karmatron based on the first design from 1986. Cover art for Karmatrón y los Transformables #4, Vol. 2. Art by Oscar González Loyo, color by Tonatiuh Rocha.

Publication information
- Publisher: ¡Ka-Boom! Estudio
- First appearance: Karmatrón y los Transformables Vol. 1 #1 (February, 1986)
- Created by: Oscar González Loyo

In-story information
- Alter ego: Zacek (White Star)
- Team affiliations: GUA, Great Universal Alliance
- Abilities: Manipulates energy Telekinesis; Clairvoiyance; Fires bolts of energy Can make astral journeys Space travel Supersonic atmospheric flight Power armor Power saber Energy boomerangs Energy shurikens Invisibility; Ice saber Freezing rays

Karmatrón y los Transformables (Karmatron and the Transformables) is a Mexican science fiction and fantasy comic book created by Oscar González Loyo, and published in 1986 by CEPSA. The weekly series was published only in Mexico, non-stop and during 5 years, from 1986 to 1991 (#298).

The comic is considered one of the first Mexican sci-fi super robot works inspired by "anime" and is notable because of its once-per-week publication schedule, something slightly uncommon, but shared by many other publications (or surpassed as Santo El Enmascarado de Plata was at one point published 3 times per week), at its time of release.

== Series summary ==
Karmatron depicts the adventures of an extraterrestrial humanoid called Zacek ("White Star" in Maya language), emperor of the alien Zuyua people and also a Kundalini warrior that an ancient prophecy announced to be the one who could restore the balance between light and darkness in the universe. Zacek was the bearer of the powerful Kalpe-Om, a magical belt that allowed him to transform himself into Karmatron, a 300 feet tall armoured spiritual warrior. Karmatron defended good and peace in all the universe, constantly fighting the forces of dark emperor Asura of Metnal and his evil god, the Master of Shadows, with the help of his numerous friends and his Transformables, an army of giant transformers. Later on, he created smaller ones -like Magneto and Warp.

The comic has been called a space opera by its author, though it also had certain elements of comedy, adventure, and fantasy.

== Plot ==
Art from Karmatrón y los Transformables #1 (1992 re-run) showing the nineties redesign of the titular character with prince Zacek at the bottom. Cover art by Oscar González Loyo.

The story starts millions of years ago, in a very distant place in the universe—Planet Zuyua—where Zacek lived peacefully as the youngest of two heirs to the Zuyuan throne. There, young Zacek learned advanced cybernetics as a career, and he often built robots, big and small, as a hobby. His father, emperor Canilek (Snakestar, in mayan) was the founder and leader of the Great Universal Alliance (a galactic United Nations of sorts) that opposed emperor Asura's militaristic campaign of universal conquest.

In issue # 1, Asura's metnalian army invaded Planet Zuyua's capital city and forced the zuyuan people out of their own planet, as thousands of them were exterminated by emperor Asura's bloodthirsty occupation forces. In the middle of the attack, four giant robots programmed by Zacek to activate in case of peril suddenly burst into action, attacking Asura's soldiers and ships and wreaking havoc in the invading army.

Enter the first of many Transformables (also known as Guerreros Estelares or Stellar Warriors): Titan, a robot/tank and the Transformables' leader; Aquarius, a robot/submarine; Stelaris, a speedy robot/spaceship and Unicorn, a robot/subterranean vehicle. These four unexpected robotic heroes helped the zuyuans to survive the invasion so they could plan their exodus to a safer planet.

However, while zuyuan strategists planned an escape route from Planet Zuyua, emperor Canilek sent his two sons on a quest to seek the Planet of Eternity, a sacred, mystical place where spiritual warriors go to attempt to awake the Kundalini serpent that lived in Mount Meru, and thus gain the spiritual transcendence, wisdom, inner peace and power that comes with being a Kundalini. Canilek hoped that at least one of his sons became the prophesied Kundalini warrior who would defeat Asura and bring back peace to the universe. Unfortunately, Canilek's best friend and advisor, Aspier, was also a spy who informed emperor Asura of Canilek's plans. Aspier was also commanded by Asura to kill Canilek when the appropriate time came, which he gleefully did, helped by the turmoil of Asura's invasion.

Meanwhile, Zacek and his older brother Nazul arrived at the Planet of Eternity, but as they reached the sacred serpent's chamber located in the depths of Mount Meru, a metnalian soldier who followed them by Asura's command assaulted the two princes (Asura knew of the prophecy of the Kundalini that would defeat him) and managed to grab Nazul and take him to his ship before he could go into the serpent's resting place. Zacek was unable to help his brother, because the heavy slab of stone that guarded the serpent's chamber entrance slammed shut in that precise moment, trapping him in there. A voice in the chamber told Zacek that he had no other choice than to follow his father's wishes and attempt to awake the Kundalini Serpent, which he reluctantly did. The zuyuan prince underwent the difficult task of awakening the sacred serpent, a feat that only the most spiritually enlightened and pure of heart could accomplish. Zacek managed to succeed in his mission, and became a full-fledged Kundalini warrior. Katnatek, the first Kundalini warrior (and the voice he heard when he entered the chamber) appeared before him then and gave him his Kalpe-Om, the magical item that allowed him to transform in the most powerful warrior of good in this universe (the audience is later informed that there are many possible universes, and each possible universe has its own Karmatron). By uttering a sacred mantra, Zacek transformed into Karmatron for the first time.

Fully equipped with his powerful new armor, Karmatron rushed then to Planet Metnal to save his brother, but he arrived too late. Emperor Asura tortured Nazul at his leisure, and then the dark emperor dumped him into Metnal's dreaded Darkness Zone, a place full of twisted, voracious man-eating beasts. Karmatron arrived at the Darkness Zone only to find the mangled corpse of Nazul still being devoured by the monsters who dwelled there. He also discovered that the evil emanations that impregnated the entire planet Metnal were very noxious to him (actually, evil in general was very noxious to him, because he used good spiritual power to fuel his powers) so he could only managed to escape rapidly from that horrid place with his brother's remains in his hands. Asura caught a glimpse of this awesome steel giant that came to his planet, and he became violently enraged then, for he acknowledge him for what he was, and knew him to be the source of many future problems.

The comic book followed Zacek's further adventures as he battled Asura across the galaxies, through many millennia, and the story was interrupted abruptly in issue # 298, with Karmatron fighting Asura here on Earth in modern times. The comic book was discontinued then and fans of all ages still hope for the saga to start anew.

The lost continent of Mu is featured as the location of one of the base cities of some of the main characters. The Moai of Easter Island are said to be images of a robot called Pazkuash, protector of Mu. Likewise, the ancient Olmec and Toltec statues and artifacts like the Olmec colossal heads and the Atlantean figures are -according to the plot- actually representations of the transformers Olmec and Toltec respectively.

== Karmatron's powers ==
Zacek, as all Kundalini Warriors, can manipulate prana energy to create various effects: He can teleport short distances; he has some degree of telekinetic talent; he can read minds and thoughts; he can use clairvoyance; he can read the psychic imprints on an object; he can turn invisible; he can fire bolts of positive spiritual energy (and he can make weapons out of this energy, such as shurikens or boomerangs) and he can make astral journeys, leaving his body behind him.

All Kundalini Warriors can stop their heartbeats completely in order to fool their enemies, or to avoid the effects of a lethal poison or radiation. This faked death is pretty convincing, as the warrior's body has effectively stopped functioning, but this is a very dangerous feat to perform. Kundalini Warriors can only do this three times in their lives. Zacek has already done it twice.

As Karmatron, Zacek has all his Kundalini powers enhanced by a tenfold (or more), he has super-strength, near physical invulnerability, the ability to fire a variety of types of rays and bolts, he has flight capability, he can survive in space or in any environment short of a nuclear inferno (which almost killed him once) and he can shrink to microscopic level.

== Themes ==
Several sci-fi and fantasy elements from the series were based in the boom of both genres during the late seventies and early eighties that took place in American mass media in the west, as well as the super robot and mecha anime genres from Japan in the east.

The "ancient astronaut theory" is one of the principal components of the main storyline in Karmatron. Buddhism, Taoism, Esoterism and Mayanism are also featured heavily in the series. The comic itself was meant to deliver a pastiche of multiple philosophies, doctrines and new age concepts -some of them contradictory between them-, through the story of an intergalactic battle between two forces marked as definitive good versus evil, reinforcing the intention of the author of establishing his own conception of Ying and Yang.

The last numbers of the comic were dedicated to themes that did not dealt with the comic story itself, including 8 whole numbers filled with a philosophical and metaphysical indoctrination manual called "Manual del guerrero Kundalini" (Kundalini Warrior Guide).

== Creation and publication ==
According to González Loyo most of the main characters, the basic concept and plot of Karmatron were created as early as 1978, but the lack of interested publishers pushed back the release of the comic for several years.

The original name for the series was originally intended to be "Karmatrón y los Guerreros Estelares" (Karmatron and the Stellar Warriors), as initially the robot allies of Karmatron were not supposed to transform at all. However, because of the tremendous success of later eighties animated series with transforming robots such as Transformers and Gobots the publisher requested Gonzalez Loyo to include characters of this type in the comic book, so finally the series would be renamed Karmatron y los Transformables to increase sales.

The series was finally published for the first time in February 1986, in a weekly format and until mid 1991. Each comic had 32 pages and the whole original series from the eighties lasted 298 issues.

Each comic of the classic eighties series was made completely in one week, but sometimes past numbers were re-edited and relaunched or substituted by issues with great amounts of text to be able to complete its weekly schedule deadline. The creator of the series claims that during the 5 years of its publication the comic managed to have more than 100,000 comics sold. However, there is no registry or any other information to confirm such numbers.

In 1992 a new reboot edition was released in a black and white graphic novel format with redesigned characters, but this was a special limited series that lasted just a couple issues.

In December 2002 the comic series was again remade entirely by ¡Ka-Boom! Studio with a modified storyline, new art, improved modern digital coloring, new designs and a bigger, more standard comic book size format. The release schedule of each issue for the new reboot series has been extremely irregular with comics released after 2 months or up to a 1 year hiatus. So far 20 numbers have been published, with the latest issue released in late 2017.

== Crossovers ==
Because of the title's popularity during the eighties, several issues included crossovers with popular characters from other Mexican independent comics of the same period.

Numbers 100 to 104 of the original series -published in 1988- included a crossover called "Karmatrón vs Destrúktor" with several characters from Destrúktor, El Defensor Cósmico (Destruktor, The Cosmic Defender), another popular Mexican science fiction weekly comic from 1987 that lasted 33 issues and was drawn by artist Nicanor Peña Cabrera.

From number 284 to 286 -published in 1991- another crossover called "Aventuras en el Planeta Tier-rata" (Adventures in Planet Earth-Rat or Adventures in Planet Terrat) took place, where the protagonists were Jiva and Robby (Karmatron sidekicks and comic relief characters from Oscar González Loyo) as well as Visitor Zot and rats Fulano, Zutano and Mengano (from an indie comic by artist and author Francisco "Paco" Baca).

== Free online version ==
The first 45 issues of the first Karmatrón y los Transformables comic series -originally published in a weekly schedule during the year 1986- have been made available online by ¡Ka-Boom! Studio for free since 2008, with later numbers still pending publication.

== Reception ==
The comic had a decent reception between Mexican comic book readers, as at the time -the late eighties- the amount of new national titles was close to zero, and even American franchises were scarce at that point, with only Grupo Editorial Vid and Novedades Editores taking on the occasional publishing of American comics.

The series was also successful partially because of the mid eighties boom of sci-fi anime and cartoons that took place in Mexican TV during that time after the release of animated series such as Mazinger Z, Transformers, Voltron and Robotech. This allowed Karmatron to acquire some fame and notoriety in the comics medium in Mexico.

However, as the storyline progressed and the philosophical ideas exposed and the mysticism turned more dense and evident, both the editorial and the public became more and more alienated until the comic ceased to be published in the early nineties.

Nevertheless, the series is fondly remembered by many Mexicans who were children during the eighties for its peculiar Japanese anime influenced art style and is still considered one of the first true Mexican sci-fi robot "manga" works. Also of note was its weekly publication schedule, an uncommon practice during its decade of publication. According to the creator of the comic many foreign comic artists and authors -who published their works monthly- couldn't believe that a weekly comic was even possible at the time of publication of Karmatron.

== Adaptations ==
The author stated in July 2016 that a Hollywood studio was interested in making a film adaptation of the franchise.

== See also ==
- Comics in Mexico
