= Oscar Alvarado =

Mexican artist

- Born: Oscar Alvarado Mendoza; Guadalajara, Mexico
- Years active: 1998 – present

Oscar Alvarado Mendoza (born in Guadalajara) is a Mexican illustrator, animator and composer whose work include the comics series Penumbra and the animated short-films Sonámbulo and Murnau the Vampire.

== Penumbra ==
The subject of vampires has always been one of Alvarado's obsessions since he was a child but it was until 1998 when Alvarado started the comics series through which he became a cult figure: Penumbra. The story draws on his personal mythology and classical versions of the vampire myth. Though highly experimental and underground in nature and distribution the series gradually became a success in his native Guadalajara. The first print was self-published by Alvarado's own publishing house, Imaginaria Comics. In 2008 he published a commemorative graphic novel under the same title as a celebration for the first ten years of the project.

== Sonámbulo ==
While working on Penumbra Alvarado embarked on the production of an independent animation project named Sonámbulo. This silent short is based on Robert Wiene's expressionist film Das Cabinet des Dr. Caligari. The project was again self-financed supported by Alvarado's own students. The soundtrack was made by the group Sutra.

== Murnau the Vampire and other projects ==
Alvarado has been busy the last years making short-films and fleshing-out old and new ideas. In 2004 he was invited to attend the Blender Conference in Amsterdam where he presented his project Roboto, a series of ten shorts about robots. His most ambitious project until now has been Murnau the Vampire, the first Mexican animation film realized on DVD format. It was presented at the 2007 Blender Conference and the band Theatre des Vampires collaborated in the soundtrack. He's currently working on the film Le Monsieur, le Vampire et Marcelle.

Since 1999 he has been teaching illustration and animation at the Fondo de Cultura Económica in Guadalajara.

== See also ==
- Creative Commons
- F W Murnau
- Blender (software)
