= Oscar González Guerrero =

Mexican comic book artist (1926-2017)

- Born: January 17, 1926
- Died: 18 May 2017 (aged 91) Naucalpan, Estado de México
- Areas: Penciller, art director, painter
- Notable works: Hermelinda Linda (co-creator); Las Aventuras de Capulina; Zor y los Invencibles

Oscar González Guerrero (January 17, 1926 - May 18, 2017 in Mexico City) was a comic book artist mostly known for his co-creation of Zor y Los Invencibles and Hermelinda Linda. He served as the artistic director of ¡Ka-Boom! Estudio, a family-owned company of local comics, founded in 1994 with his son and his son's girlfriend, Susana Romero.

== Comics career ==
His career started in the 1950s, working on various comic books from that era. From 1959 to 1981 he worked as an artistic director in titles as Las Aventuras de Capulina, El Tío Porfirio, Zor y los Invencibles, Hermelinda Linda, Burrerías, Smog, Don Leocadio, among others for Editormex Mexicana, a now defunct Mexican publishing house.

In the 1980s he created Spectrum, later renamed Xpctrm, later adapted by Susana Romero. He also co-created Némesis 3000, La Alianza, a new comic book yet to be published.

He taught comic book art at his studio since the 1960s, and helped many young talents to work in the field.

== Personal life ==
His son was Oscar González Loyo, Mexican comic book artist and creator of Karmatrón y los Transformables.

== See also ==
- Comics in Mexico
