= El Fisgón =

Mexican cartoonist

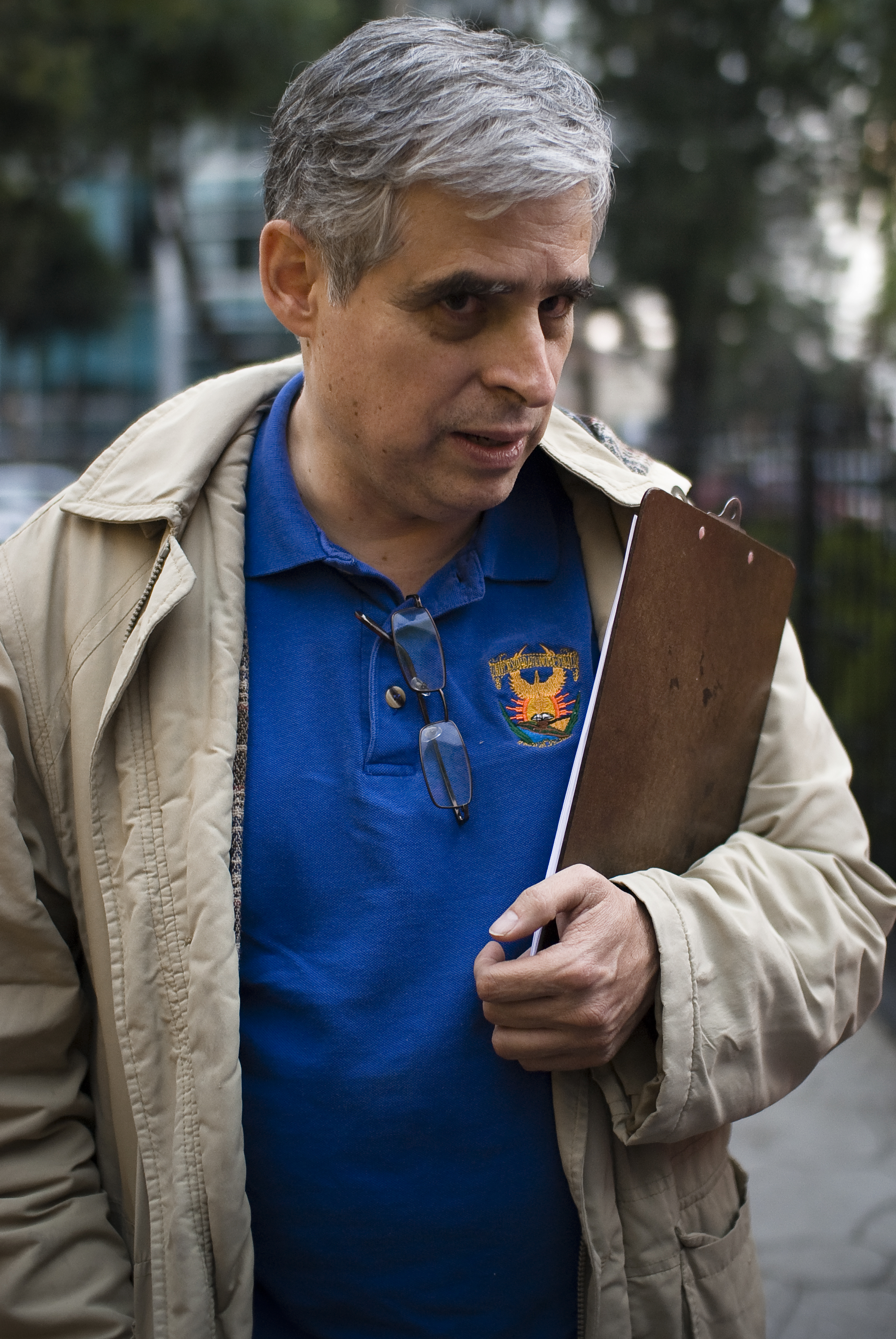
- El Fisgón in 2009.
- Born: Rafael Barajas Durán; 1 January 1956 (age 70); Mexico City, Mexico
- Education: National Autonomous University of Mexico (UNAM)
- Awards: National Journalism Prize of Mexico for Editorial Cartooning (1999).

Rafael Barajas Durán, better known by his pen name El Fisgón ("The Rubbernecker" or "The Peeper" in Spanish) is a Mexican cartoonist and illustrator who received the 1999 National Journalism Prize of Mexico for Editorial Cartooning.

The son of a schoolteacher and a psychoanalyst, Barajas was born on 1 January 1956 in Mexico City and graduated from the National Autonomous University of Mexico (UNAM) in 1978 with a bachelor's degree in architecture. At the age of 20 he decided to become a cartoonist and eventually sent collaborations to the Sunday supplement of Unomásuno (1981–1984), designed covers for Nexos magazine (1984–1986) and received a Guggenheim Fellowship (2003) to study dissenting political cartoonists in Mexico who worked between 1872 and 1910.

According to himself, Barajas is also a committed leftist activist who has led campaigns to support the Zapatista rebels in Chiapas and regularly promote student involvement in politics. He has co-directed satirical magazines such as El Chahuistle (1994–1997) and El Chamuco y los hijos del Averno (1997–2000) and, since 1984, he contributes regularly to La Jornada, a left-leaning newspaper published in the Mexican capital.

His mother was Rosa Maria Duran.

== Books ==
- Sobras escogidas ("Selected Leftovers", 1987).
- Me lleva el TLC ("I am being carried away by NAFTA", 1993).
- El sexenio me da risa ("The Six-Years Term Makes Me Laugh", 1994).
- Cómo sobrevivir al neoliberalismo sin dejar de ser mexicano ("How to Survive Neoliberalism Without Failing To Be Mexican", 1996).
- Hacia un despiporre global de excelencia y calidad ("Towards a Global Mishmash of Excellence and Quality", 2002).
- La historia de un país en caricatura ("A Country's History in Cartoons", 2000).
- El país de El Ahuizote ("El Ahuizote’s Country", 2005).
- El país del Llorón de Icamole ("Crier of Icamole’s Country", 2007).
- Cómo triunfar en la globalización (published in English as "How to Succeed at Globalization: A Primer for Roadside Vendors", 2005).
- La bola de la Independencia ("The Mob of Independence", 2008).
- Cómo la hacen de Pemex (2008).
- Sólo me río cuando me duele ("I Only Cry When It Hurts", 2009).
- Dulce venganza ("Sweet Vendetta", 2009).
- La vendedora de nubes ("The Clouds Seller", 2009, with Elena Poniatowska).
