= Óscar González (boxer) =

Mexican boxer (1990–2014)

Personal information
- Nickname: Fantasma
- Born: April 22, 1990 Tepic, Nayarit, Mexico
- Died: February 3, 2014 (aged 23) Mexico City, Mexico
- Weight: Super bantamweight featherweight

Boxing career

Boxing record
- Wins: 23
- Losses: 1

Óscar González (April 22, 1990 – February 3, 2014) was a Mexican professional boxer. During his career, he fought at super bantamweight and featherweight.

González fought as a professional from 2007 until 2014, with a career record of 23 wins against 1 defeat. His nickname was "Fantasma", which is the Spanish word for "ghost". His promoter was Box Latino, the same company that promoted Erik Morales.

== Boxing career ==
González was born in Tepic, Nayarit, the son of Miguel Angel González and Luz Teresa Arriaga. He turned professional in Mexico in March 2007, and later won the WBC Youth World Super Bantamweight and the WBC (USNBC) Super Bantamweight titles. His better known victories included wins over Rico Ramos, Raúl Hirales, Giovanni Caro, Adrian Young, Héctor Velázquez, Caril Herrera, Manuel Aguilar, Wacharakrit Senahan and Carlos Fulgencio.

== Death ==
On February 1, 2014, González took on Jesús Galicia in a bout for the WBC Latino Silver. González was hospitalized after a 10th-round knockout, and a few days later, died at the age of 23.

== Personal life ==
González was married to Magaly Avalos.
