= Rebelde (comics) =

Mexican comic book series

Rebelde was a Mexican comic book series, published by now defunct Ka-Boom! Estudio, based on the telenovela of the same title. The comic was first published April 2006 and lasted only two issues due to conflicts caused by Ka-Boom's writers. Despite initial demand being high, the amateur writing team from Ka-Boom delivered the scripts for the first three issues months later than agreed, causing the art team trouble and also creating conflicts with Televisa's editorial representatives, which led to the cancellation of the title.

The series was advertised as being based on the style of Japanese manga, but it was only partially based on it.

The creative team was formed by Rebeca Soriano as writer, with art duties provided (in the 2 published issues) by Jorge Reséndiz, inks by Eridan Zumaya and color by Guillermo Piña; writing direction by Susana Romero; art direction by Oscar González Guerrero, and the direction and editing of the project by Oscar González Loyo.

== Reception ==
The book's first issue sold well, but the delay between the first and the second issues caused sales to drop tremendously. The art received praise as the faux anime style was popular during the time of print, while the script was heavily criticized by fans to the original TV show as being poorly characterized and too disconnected from the original source.

== See also ==
- Rebelde (Mexican telenovela)
- RBD
