= Oscar González Oro =

Argentine journalist and radio host (1951–2026)

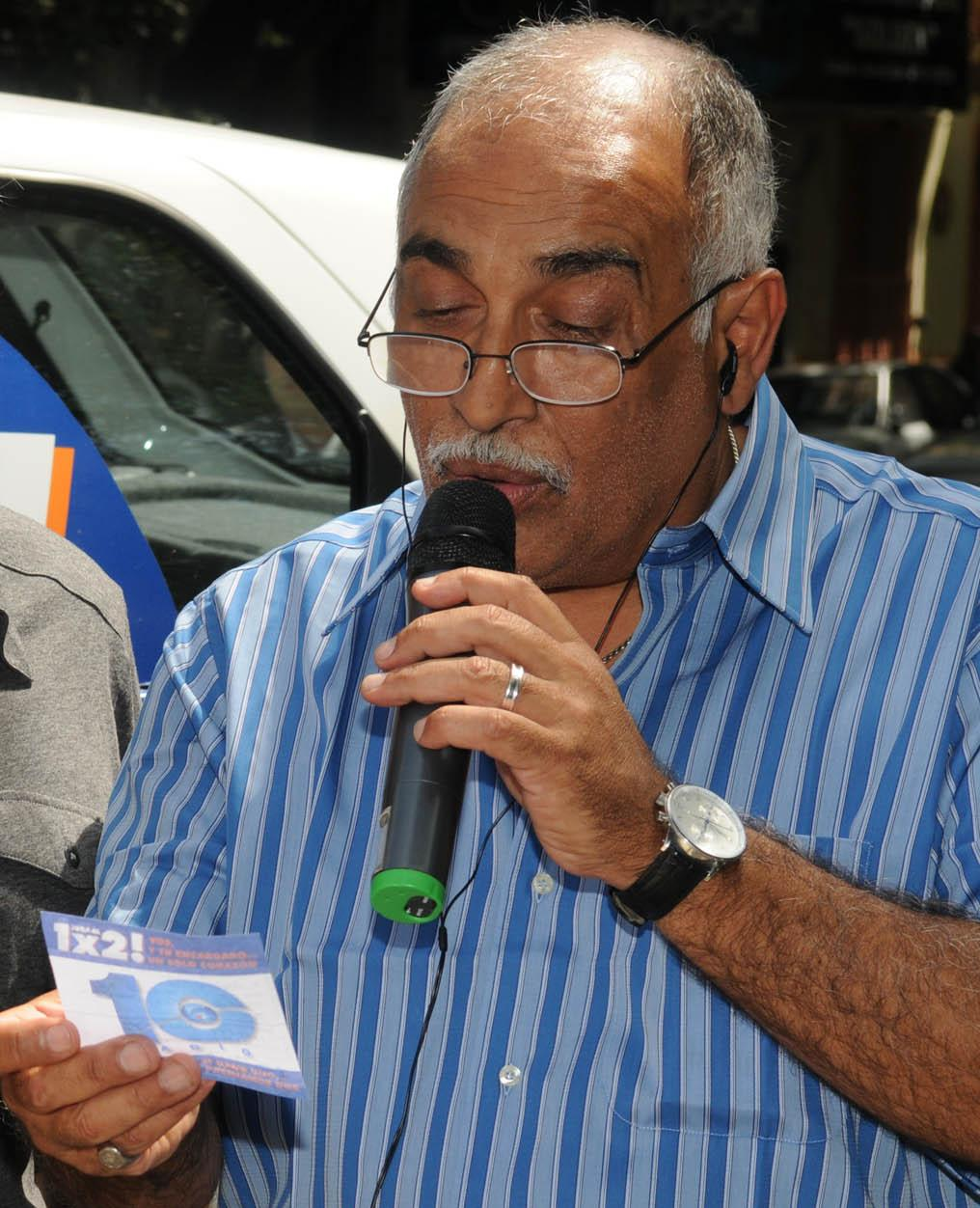
- Born: 16 October 1951; Mendoza, Province of Mendoza, Argentina
- Died: 25 September 2026 (aged 74); Punta del Este, Uruguay

Oscar González Oro (16 October 1951 – 25 September 2026), also known as El Negro Oro, was an Argentine journalist and radio host.

== Career ==
=== Talk shows ===
- Nosotros a la mañana
- Los unos y los otros
- Polémica en el bar
- Tarde pero temprano (Radio Rivadavia)
- La vida misma (Radio Rivadavia)

== Personal life and death ==
González Oro was born in Mendoza, Argentina, on 16 October 1951; his family moved to Buenos Aires when he was eleven. He came out as gay in 2016.

He retied from journalism in 2021, a year after he moved to Punta del Este, Uruguay. Also by 2021, he obtained Uruguayan citizenship. González Oro died in Punta del Este on 25 September 2026, at the age of 74.

== Bibliography ==
- Radiografía de mi país: la Argentina que me duele (2005).
