= Museo del Estanquillo =

Museum in the Historic Center of Mexico City

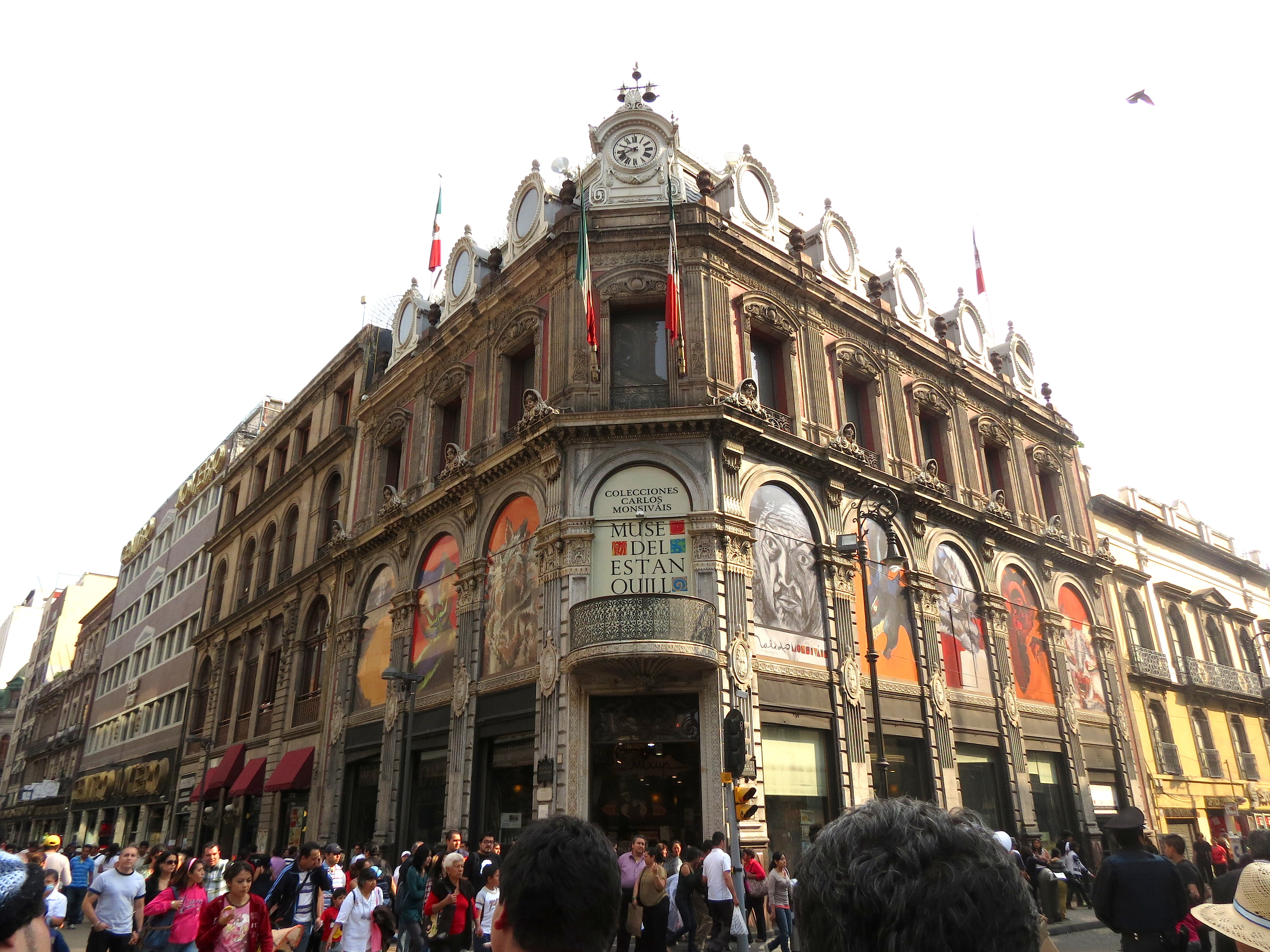
- The museum is located in the Edificio Esmeralda
- Established: November 23, 2006
- Location: Mexico City, Mexico
- Coordinates: 19.4333°N 99.1362°W
- Type: Popular Art
- Director: Henoc de Santiago Dulché
- Public transit access: Metro Zócalo and Metro Allende (Line 2)
- Website: http://www.museodelestanquillo.com

The Museo del Estanquillo ("Museum of the Little Shop") is located in the Historic Center of Mexico City, Mexico. The museum houses the personal collection of the writer Carlos Monsiváis, encompassing paintings, photography, toys, albums, calendars, advertising and books.

== History of the Museum ==
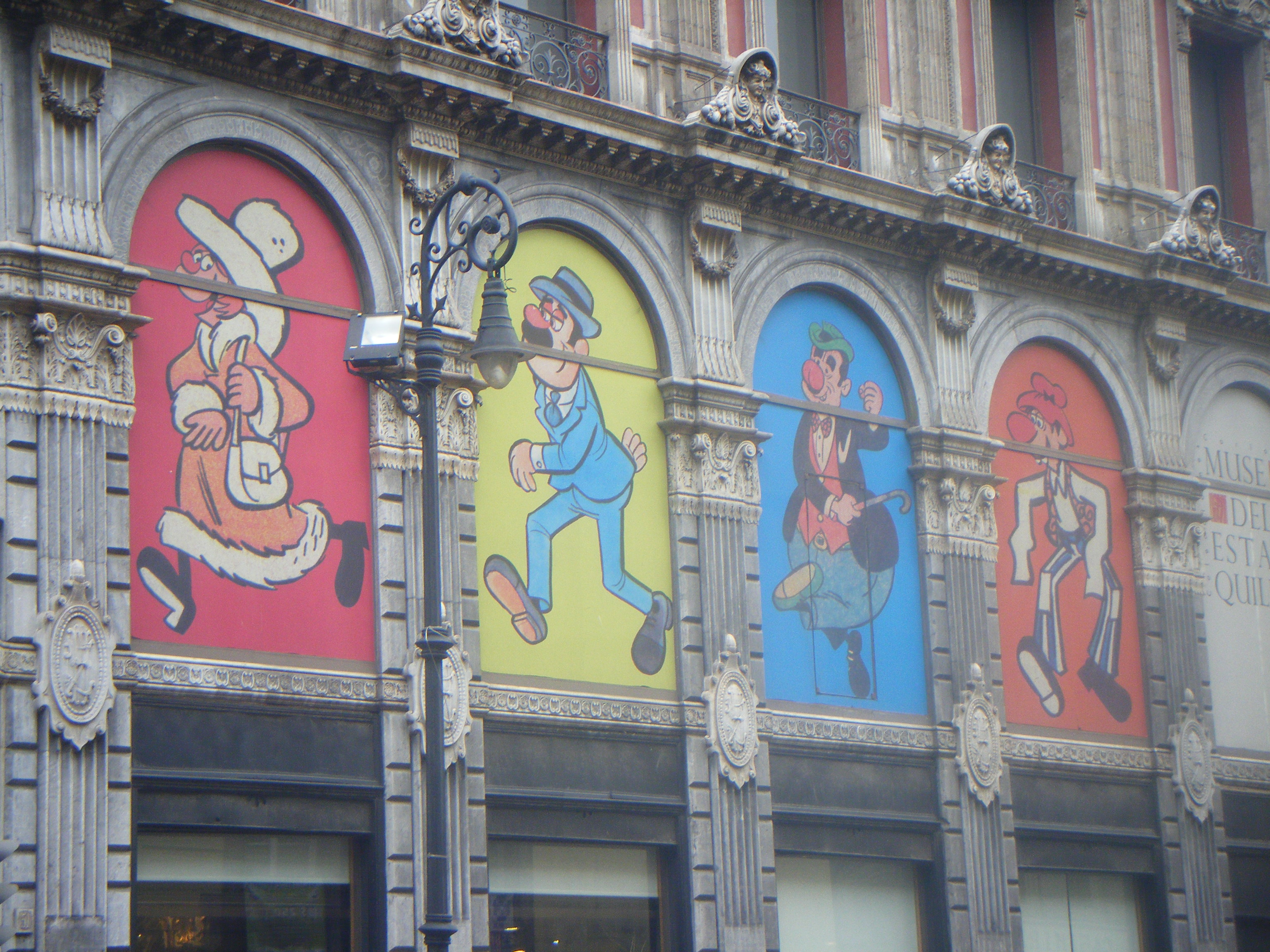
Drawings by Gabriel Vargas in the windows of the museum

For more than 30 years, Carlos Monsiváis was dedicated to collecting about 20,000 objects, which have been grouped into photography, miniature models; drawings and cartoons; engravings and everyday life. Overall, the collection is centered on the life of Mexico and folk art.

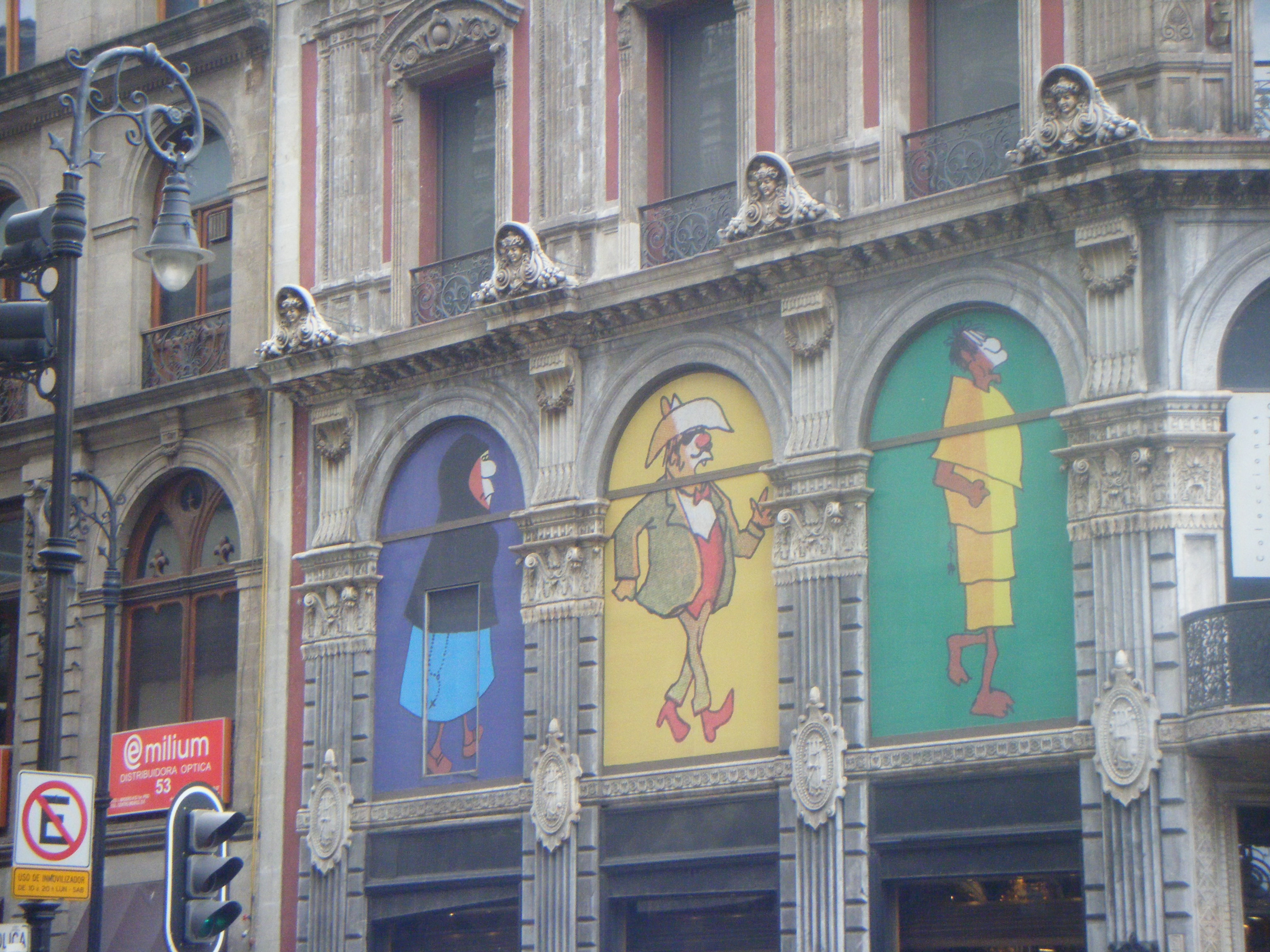
Drawings by Rius in the windows of the museum

The idea for a museum was supported by Rafael Barajas, Carlos Payán, Carlos Slim and the then mayor, Andrés Manuel López Obrador. The name was coined by Carlos Monsiváis himself, since his collection includes various, diverse objects, like a small sundries shop, or estanquillo. The museum opened on November 23, 2006, with the exhibition, En orden de aparición about the identity of the capital from Colonial times to the present day. It is supported by municipal funds.

== History of the Building ==
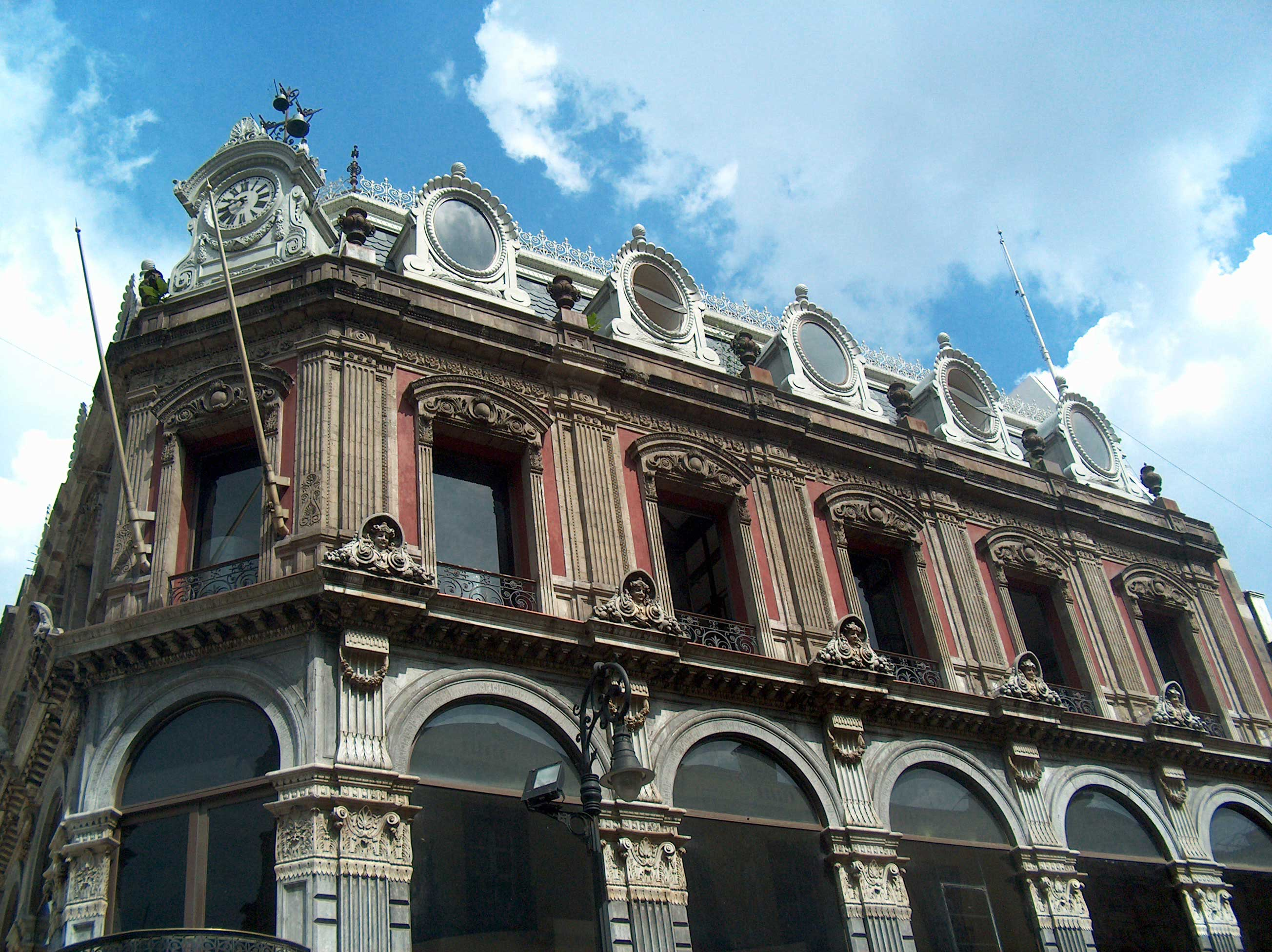
The La Esmeralda building

The museum is located in the La Esmeralda building on the corner of Isabel La Católica Street and Madero Street. It was home to the late nineteenth century jeweler La Esmeralda Hauser-Zivy and company.

Throughout the twentieth century the building had several twists, from jewelry shop to government office, then to a bank; and even hosted the nightclub La Opulencia. Today, it also houses a record store.
