= Oscar González Loyo =

Mexican comic book artist (1959–2021)

- Born: Oscar González Loyo; 11 April 1959 Mexico City, Mexico
- Died: 7 February 2021 (aged 61)
- Areas: Writer, Penciller, Inker, Editor, Publisher
- Notable works: Karmatrón y Los Transformables; Las Aventuras de Parchís; Simpsons Comics; Joe's World
- Awards: Eisner Award

Oscar González Loyo (11 April 1959 in Mexico City - 7 February 2021) was a comic book artist, author of Karmatrón y Los Transformables. González Loyo was the son of late comic book artist Oscar González Guerrero. He was also the founder and a main partner of the company ¡Ka-Boom! Estudio.

== Career ==
Oscar González Loyo did his first semi-professional comic art page in 1973, in the Mexican comic Las Aventuras de Capulina, when he was only 14 years old. He has cited Walt Disney, Osamu Tezuka and Will Eisner as important influences in his art style.

Over the years, he has worked on titles like Las Aventuras de Cepillín, Las Aventuras de Parchís, Katy la Oruga, El Monje Loco, The Flintstones, Karmatrón y Los Transformables, The New Speed Racer color book, Tiny Toons, Looney Tunes, The Simpsons Comics and Bart Simpson Comics.

González Loyo also worked on the covers of the Astroboy, Kimba and Gigantor's American VHS and Laser Disc editions in the late eighties and early nineties.

From 1996 to 2000 he storyboarded animations for the Latin American version of Sesame Street, including the show's opening credits.

In 2000, he earned the Eisner Award at San Diego Comic-Con for his work on Bart Simpson's Treehouse of Horror, along with Jill Thompson, Steve Steere Jr., Scott Shaw, Sergio Aragonés, and Doug TenNapel.

González Loyo also published the webcomic Joe's World (until 2014) and was working in the remake of Karmatrón.

== See also ==
- Comics in Mexico

== Awards ==
- 2000 Eisner Award for Best Humor Publication / Best Comics Publication for a Younger Audience (shared with Jill Thompson, Steve Steere Jr., Scott Shaw!, Sergio Aragonés, and Doug TenNapel).
