= Cerdotado =

El Cerdotado is a Mexican satirical comic, which ran between 1998 and 4 April 2019. His name is a play on the words, Cerdo = Pig and Dotado = Gifted. The character was created in Monterrey, Mexico, by Leopoldo Jasso. El Certodado is an anthropomorphic pig anti-hero who fights against the injustices of the Mexican political-social-economic situation but sometimes he also works with them.

The strip first appeared in a magazine edited by the School of Visual Arts of University of Nuevo León, but is now published daily in the nationally syndicated newspaper, Milenio.

== Powers ==
El Cerdotado has powers similar to Superman. He can fly, has x-ray vision, high frequency hearing, armoured skin and can move at 'superspeed'. He also has "a coward cloak", a time machine, a suit that makes him travel thru the internet (à la Tron) and other abilities. He has "mental powers", such as mind-reading and the ability to sense when his girlfriend, Jersey, an anthropomorphic cow, cheats him. He can listen radio waves. He displays a healing ability: When he runs, his legs and lower body are destroyed due to friction or his skin ripples to the point of coming off due to the speed, but he eventually regenerates after scaring friends and foes to death.

His catchphrase is "Ajooy!"

== Weaknesses ==
As an anti-hero, the character can be easily corrupted. He is often seen to be depressed and it is inferred he is a porn addict and sometimes an alcoholic. He also is a brutal law enforcer and sometimes he breaks the law in order to get what he wants. He rarely uses his flying power because he is afraid of heights. A running gag happens when he attends a help call, sometimes he ran so fast that he can travel through time or move through dimensions. Sometimes he stops to hear a radio novela through his powers and dismiss the call for help, or sometimes he went too far that he dismiss the call by missing the place. also he has been unable to catch the nude smuggler girl because he would rather records her crimes on tape to share with the other officers.

== Allies ==
The Quitapon (brother): He shares his powers with Cerdotado, but rarely use them, he has some kind of flame in his head "Saiyayin" style.

The Omniscient and omnipresent Vulture (counselor): an ugly and terrorific Vulture that is able to reveal Cerdotado of the weakness of his enemies, but he also helps Cerdotado and Rompopeyo to go to dangerous places where Rompopeyo tries to find inspiration for his Halloween costumes.

Jersey: A voluptuous cow that is the in-and-out girlfriend and lover of Cerdotado, frequently she cheats on him with other characters, including Lloraras, a gifted and strong afroamerican guy. She has a little brother called Rompopeyo.

Tomandante: A play in the words Tomar (drink) and Comandante (Commander), he is the commander of the police group in Monterrey where Cerdotado helps with. Is corrupt and very tolerant to Cerdotado actions, even if he is out of the law.

== Foes ==
The Stoner Rabbit (El Conejo Marihuano:actually, a former psychologist named Rolando Mota del Campo, whose name is a play on the phrase "rolling weed from the countryside") a rabbit who, under the influence of drugs, can defy all the laws of physics and appears to have cosmic awareness (he often breaks the fourth wall to solve the crossword in the newspaper). He became poor due to his addictions and he must sell anything he can in public transportation with the help of Elmo Jones, his hand puppet. He usually sell products based on the events that happen in Mexico or the world (i.e. when Steve Jobs died he tried to sell Chinese copies of the iPad). Besides is a foe to Cerdotado is also a friend of some of the characters.

Elmo Jones (his name is also a play of words, El Mojones meaning The Turdy; but he often clarifies his name is pronounced Elmo Johnes): he is Rolando's hand puppet and sometimes has his own life. He usually helps Rolando sell his things using a long speech to the public transportation users, sometimes with success and other ends in catastrophe. In one episode Elmo was kidnapped and El Conejo Marihuano had to use a sock to create a puppet to convince people to lend him money to pay the ransom.

Malandro: A thief that usually has his face covered, is a common thief that is a constant victim of Cerdotado's moments of violence or also his victim in cheesy moments.

La Ladrona Encuerada (The Naked Smuggler Girl): is a gorgeous girl who steals while she is nude and only wears a baseball cap, a domino mask and tennis shoes (sometimes due to censorship she uses a unitard). As expected, is one of the hardest foes to Cerdotado due to the fact that she is voluptuous and naked so Cerdotado works hard to stop his instincts and trap her. Her weakness is romantic pop music (once a time, Cerdotado trapped her using Michael Blunt music, also to be himself trapped by a gay person).

Negro Lloraras (U-will-cry) an African Mexican guy that fights Cerdotado for the affections of Jersey. He usually takes the bigger hand due to be higher, stronger and more gifted than our hero. He works also in the Commandant.

Cascabelito, a gay cat who had raped Cerdotado several times.

Rompompeyo: little brother of Jersey, evil teen genius who enjoys bestiality with chickens, torturing people in Halloween, to use violence, sadism and he tries to create the most creative and scary Halloween disguise. He usually manages to get Cerdotado in his expeditions through dangerous places in order to get ideas.

Lic. Cachetes (Cheecks): A generic politician. He can be a president, senator, governor o deputy, depending on the moment. He is ever cunning, corrupt and opportunistic.
