= Carlos Monsiváis =

Mexican writer

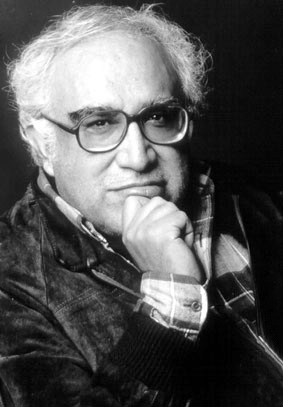
- Carlos Monsivais
- Born: Carlos Monsiváis Aceves; May 4, 1938; Mexico City, Mexico
- Died: June 19, 2010 (aged 72); Mexico City, Mexico
- Occupations: Writer and journalist
- Writing career
- Genres: Chronicle, Essay
- Notable work: Días de guardar (1971)
- Notable awards: 1977 National Journalism Prize of Mexico; 1998 "Prince Claus Award"; 2006 "Premio Anagrama de Ensayo" (2006 "Anagram of Essay Prize")
- Literary movement: Generación del '68 (1968 Generation)

Carlos Monsiváis Aceves (May 4, 1938 – June 19, 2010) was a Mexican philosopher, writer, critic, political activist, and journalist. He also wrote political opinion columns in leading newspapers within the country's progressive sectors. His generation of writers includes Elena Poniatowska, José Emilio Pacheco, and Carlos Fuentes. Monsiváis won more than 33 awards, including the 1986 Jorge Cuesta Prize (named after a fellow writer about whom he wrote a book), the 1989 Mazatlán Prize, and the 1996 Xavier Villaurrutia Award. Considered a leading intellectual of his time, Monsiváis documented contemporary Mexican themes, values, class struggles, and societal change in his essays, books and opinion pieces. He was a staunch critic of the long-ruling Partido Revolucionario Institucional (PRI), leaned towards the left-wing, and was ubiquitous in disseminating his views on radio and television. As a founding member of "Gatos Olvidados", Monsiváis wanted his and other "forgotten cats" to be provided for beyond his lifetime.

== Early life and education ==
Carlos Monsiváis Aceves was born in Mexico City on May 4, 1938. He studied economics and philosophy at the Universidad Nacional Autónoma de México (UNAM). As a student, Monsiváis was involved with protests that reestablished Mexican democracy. From 1956 to 1958, he worked at Medio Siglo ("Half Century") magazine and "Estaciones" ("Seasons") from 1957 to 1959. From 1956 to 1958, he worked as an editor at Medio Siglo, and at Estaciones from 1957 to 1959.

His writings, some of which are written with an ironic undertone, show a deep understanding of the origin and development of Mexican popular culture. As a movie critic during this time period, he is considered one of the Golden Age of Mexican cinema's premiere observers. Monsiváis enjoyed reviewing many different media, to include movies, art and football.

== Literary career ==
From 1962 to 1963 and 1967 to 1968, Monsiváis was a fellow at the "Centro Mexicano de Escritores" ("Mexican Writers's Center"). In 1965, he attended Harvard University's Center for International Studies.

In 1969, Monsiváis published his first two essays: "Principados y potestades" (lit. "Princedoms and powers") and "Características de la cultura nacional" (lit. "Characteristics of the national culture"). They were characterized as being filled with a universal curiosity and the ability to distill the core essence of Mexican political and cultural life. In 1971, he penned a chronicle called Días de guardar, which was compiled into a book with his first essays. In 1976, Monsiváis composed Amor perdido, which detailed mythical film characters based upon popular song, left-wing politics, and the bourgeoisie.

During the 1980s, Monsiváis prolifically wrote the bulk of many works that shaped and destined his career. Those works include 1984's De qué se ríe el licenciado, Entrada libre, crónicas de la sociedad que se organiza in 1987, and 1988's Escenas de pudor y liviandad. In 1982, he also wrote a book called Nuevo catecismo para indios remisos, which narrated an understanding or catechism about Mexico's indigenous people. Días de guarda and Escenas de pudor y liviandad are considered his epic works. In narrative form, Monsiváis recounted the 1985 Mexico City earthquake that killed thousands. He wrote "Historias para temblar: 19 de septiembre de 1985" ("Stories to tremble: September 19, 1985") which documented the earthquake.

In 1992, Monsiváis created a biography on Frida Kahlo entitled Frida Kahlo: Una vida, una obra.

In addition to these books, Monsiváis wrote several anthologies including La poesía mexicana del siglo X in 1966, Los narradores ante el público in 1969, and in 1986 an autobiography about Jorge Cuesta.

Monsiváis remained creative into his latter years and in 2002 wrote an essay called Yo te bendigo, vida, about Amado Nervo.

== Political involvement ==
He was known as an activist for leftist causes.

In 1968, the Tlatelolco massacre left a distinct mark on Monsiváis. His critics maintained that Monsiváis' life was filled with social movements interweaved with real life politics and entertainment figures as he wrote about that "1968 army massacre" whose death toll varied from 25 to 350 depending on the sources. Monsiváis became an early defender of the Zapatista Army of National Liberation. In 1994, he supported the Zapatistas's Chiapas revolt on behalf of Mexico's indigenous peoples. Monsiváis along with Portuguese writer Jose Saramago visited rebel camps in Chiapas.

In 1975, he collaborated with gay rights activist and writer Nancy Cárdenas on the Manifesto in Defense of Homosexuals in Mexico, published in Siempre! magazine. He had also directed the drama The Boys in the Band at Teatro de los Insurgentes in 1974, the first openly gay drama to stage on at a major theatre.

In 2002, he spoke critically against Subcomandante Marcos's letter which supported a Basque terrorist group and criticized Baltasar Garzón. In 2006, Monsiváis signed a petition in support of the independence of Puerto Rico from the United States of America.

== Later life and death ==
Monsiváis had struggled for years with pulmonary fibrosis and could be seen in his latter years with an oxygen tank. His weariness led to several hospital stays.

In 2007, Monsiváis opened the Museo del Estanquillo with an exhibition of Gabriel Vargas' La Familia Burrón paintings with the artist in person. Vargas sat paralyzed because of an affiction he had suffered for the past twenty years. In funding the museum, he paid homage to Vargas, La Familia Burrón and Eduardo del Río. The Estanquillo Museum also exhibits many of his varied works. It holds approximately 12,000 items that Monsiváis accumulated over 30 years.

In 2008, Monsiváis' love for his 20 cats led him to bequest funds for an animal shelter known as "Gatos Olvidados" (English: Forgotten Cats). For eight years, he had been attached deeply to "Miss Oginia", (a play on the word misoginia, misogyny) a cat he had saved from being euthanized and a kitten he had adopted. Monsiváis approached the Distrito Federal de México about a plot of land for 50 homeless cats because a young girl, Claudia Vázquez Lozano, sent him an email requesting his support. As a founding member of "Gatos Olvidados", Monsiváis wanted his and other forgotten cats to be provided for beyond his lifetime.

As recently as March 2010, Monsiváis presented his last collection of chronicles named Apocalipstick.

On June 19, 2010, Monsiváis was declared dead after respiratory problems by the staff of the Salvador Zubirán National Institute of Health Sciences and Nutrition. He had entered the hospital on April 2, 2010, and had declined in health.

He was buried with a gay pride flag on his coffin.

== Tributes ==
EZLN spokesman Subcomandante Marcos regarded Monsiváis as an influence. While some of his critics did not appreciate his omnipresence in all forms of the media, in a country with "low reading levels" this made him more well known amongst the people. Pacheco, a Cervantes Prize winner, once commented that Monsiváis was the "only writer people knew on the street." Poniatowska, who knew him since 1957, said, "I think he is one of the great minds of Mexico, and an intellectual of the left." Carlos Fuentes, who was in London at the time of Monsiváis' death said, "great writer who renewed the essay genre in Mexico." Mexican President Felipe Calderón lamented his death with "profound sorrow".

Of his own autobiography that he wrote at age 28, Monsiváis once said "acepté esta suerte de autobiografía con el mezquino fin de hacerme ver como una mezcla de Albert Camus y Ringo" ("I accepted this sort of autobiography with the petty purpose of making myself look like a mix of Albert Camus and Ringo").

== Personal life ==
In his book El clóset de cristal [The Glass Closet], Mexican author Braulio Peralta argues that Monsivaís was, along with Nancy Cárdenas and others, the founder of Mexico's LGBT movement, having supported Mexico's sexual minorities since the 1960s. Monsiváis chose to be buried with a gay pride flag on his coffin, indicating that he was a gay man.

Monsiváis never married and had no children. According to Poniatowska, he is survived by several nephews. Monsiváis owned a small two-story house in Mexico City's Colonia Portales. In lieu of children, he owned several small cats and gave interviews with them in his lap.

In his spare time, Monsiváis enjoyed reading and cinematography. In a 1987 television interview, he named his three favorite Mexican films: Let's Go with Pancho Villa by Fernando de Fuentes, Los Olvidados by Luis Buñuel and Doña Perfecta by Alejandro Galindo.

== Bibliography ==
=== Chronicles ===
- Días de guardar (1971)
- Amor perdido (1976)
- De qué se ríe el licenciado (una crónica de los 40) (1984)
- Entrada libre. Crónicas de la sociedad que se organiza (1987)
- Escenas de pudor y liviandad (1988)
- Luneta y galería (Atmósferas de la capital 1920-1959) (1994)
- Los rituales del caos (1995)
- «No sin nosotros». Los días del terremoto 1985-2005 (2005)

=== Essays ===
- Características de la cultura nacional (1969)
- Principados y potestades (1969)
- «Notas sobre la cultura mexicana en el siglo XX» en Historia General de México (1976)
- El Crimen en el cine (1977)
- Cultura urbana y creación intelectual. El caso mexicano (1981)
- Cuando los banqueros se van (1982)
- Confrontaciones (1985)
- El poder de la imagen y la imagen del poder. Fotografías de prensa del porfiriato a la época actual (1985)
- Historias para temblar: 19 de septiembre de 1985 (1988)
- El género epistolar. Un homenaje a manera de carta abierta (1991)
- Sin límite de tiempo con límite de espacio: arte, ciudad, gente, colección de Carlos Monsiváis (1993)
- Rostros del cine mexicano (1993)
- Por mi madre, bohemios I (1993)
- El teatro de los Insurgentes: 1953-1993 (1993)
- Los mil y un velorios. Crónica de la nota roja (1994)
- Cultura popular mexicana (1995)
- Aire de familia. Colección de Carlos Monsiváis (1995)
- El bolero (1995)
- Recetario del cine mexicano (1996)
- Diez segundos del cine nacional (1996)
- Del rancho al internet (1999)
- Aires de familia. Cultura y sociedad en América Latina (2000)
- Las herencias ocultas del pensamiento liberal del siglo XIX (2000)
- Las tradiciones de la imagen: notas sobre poesía mexicana (2001)
- Protestantismo, diversidad y tolerancia (2002)
- Bolero: clave del corazón (2004)
- Las herencias ocultas de la Reforma Liberal del Siglo XIX (2006)
- Imágenes de la tradición viva (2006)
- Las alusiones perdidas (2007)
- El estado laico y sus malquerientes (2008)
- El 68, La tradición de la resistencia (2008)

=== Biography ===
- Carlos Monsiváis (Autobiografía) (1966)
- Celia Montalván (te brindas voluptuosa e impudente) (1982)
- María Izquierdo (1986)
- Luis García Guerrero (1987)
- José Chávez Morado (1989)
- Escenas mexicanas en la obra de Teresa Nava (1997)
- Salvador Novo. Lo marginal en el centro (2000)
- Adonde yo soy tú somos nosotros. Octavio Paz: crónica de vida y obra (2000)
- Novoamor (2001)
- Yo te bendigo, vida. Amado Nervo: crónica de vida y obra (2002)
- Leopoldo Méndez 1902-2002 (2002)
- Carlos Pellicer: iconografía (2003)
- Annita Brenner: visión de una época (2006)
- Frida Kahlo (2007)
- Rosa Covarrubias: una americana que amó México (2007)
- Pedro Infante: las leyes del querer (2008)

=== Narrative ===
- Nuevo catecismo para indios remisos (1982)

=== Other books in collaboration ===
- Historia General de México (1972)/ Colegio de México
- Frida Kahlo. Una vida, una obra (1992) / Rafael Vázquez Bayod
- A través del espejo: el cine mexicano y su público (1994) / Carlos Bonfil
- Parte de guerra. Tlatelolco 1968. Documentos del general Marcelino García Barragán. Los hechos y la historia (1999) / Julio Scherer
- Parte de Guerra II. Los rostros del 68 (2002) / Julio Scherer
- Tiempo de saber (2003) / Julio Scherer
- El centro histórico de la Ciudad de México (2006) / Francis Alÿs
- El viajero lúgubre: Julio Ruelas modernista, 1870-1907 (2007) / Antonio Saborit y Teresa del Conde
- El hombre de negro (2007) / Helioflores

=== Anthologies ===
- La poesía mexicana del Siglo XX (1966)
- Poesía mexicana II, 1915-1979 (1979)
- A Ustedes Les Consta. Antología de la Crónica en México (1980)
- Lo fugitivo permanece. 21 cuentos mexicanos (1984)
- La poesía mexicana II, 1915-1985 (1985)

=== Works in Translation ===
- Mexican postcards (1997) / Trans. John Kraniauskas.
- A new catechism for recalcitrant indians (2007) / Trans. Jeffrey Browitt and Nidia Esperanza Castrillón.
- Obřady chaosu (2007) / Trans. Markéta Riebová.

== Awards ==
In 1977, Monsiváis won the National Journalism Prize of Mexico which recognized his genre of chronicles.

Monsiváis was honoured with a Prince Claus Award in 1998 from the Prince Claus Fund, an international culture and development organization based in Amsterdam.

In 2000, Monsiváis was awarded the "Premio Anagrama de Ensayo" ("Anagram of Essay Prize"). At the "Feria Internacional del Libro de Guadalajara" (" International Book Fair of Guadalajara") in 2006, he received the "FIL de Guadalajara Prize") along with its $100,000 prize money and has been awarded honorary doctorates from universities in Peru, Arizona, Universidad Autónoma Metropolitana and the Universidad Autónoma de Sinaloa. Monsiváis has won more than 33 awards with his last coming from the Universidad Autónoma de San Luis Potosí. Along with Miguel León-Portilla, Friedrich Katz, Fuentes and Pacheco, Monsiváis was a past recipient of The Medalla 1808 from the government of Mexico City.
