= Gabriel Vargas (cartoonist) =

Mexican cartoonist (1915–2010)

- 1983 "Premio Nacional de Periodismo" (National Journalism Prize) award ceremony
- Born: Gabriel Vargas Bernal; February 5, 1915 Tulancingo, Hidalgo
- Died: May 25, 2010 (aged 95) Mexico City
- Areas: Cartoonist, painter
- Notable works: La Familia Burrón (comic strip); The Burrón Family
- Awards: 1983 National Journalism Prize of Mexico; 2003 "Premio Nacional de Ciencias y Artes en el área de Tradiciones Populares" (National Sciences and Arts Prize)

Gabriel Vargas Bernal (5 February 1915 – 25 May 2010) was a Mexican cartoonist, whose comic strip La Familia Burrón was created in 1937. This cartoon has been described as one of the most important in Mexican popular culture. Vargas won the National Journalism Prize of Mexico in 1983 and the "Premio Nacional de Ciencias y Artes en el área de Tradiciones Populares" (National Sciences and Arts Prize) in 2003.

== Early life and education ==
Gabriel Vargas was born in Tulancingo, Hidalgo, on February 5, 1915, and had 11 siblings. His father was a merchant and died when Gabriel was four years old. In 1922, his mother, Josefina Bernal, moved the family to Mexico City. Around 1928, Vargas began work as a draftsman for the Excélsior newspaper and eventually became its chief drawer by 1931 when he was sixteen. Vargas won an art contest sponsored by Panamericana Editorial which led to him penning his first comic, Los Superlocos, whose main protagonists became the basis for La Familia Burrón.

== La Familia Burrón ==
In 1937, Vargas began drawing La Familia Burrón as a separate piece which documented parents, Regino Burrón and Borola Tacuche de Burrón, their two teenage children, Regino and Macuca Burrón, and Foforito Cantarranas, a younger kid who was adopted by the Burróns. La Familia Burrón profiled a lower class family's daily comedic struggles in an impoverished Mexican barrio. At the height of its popularity, the comic strip helped circulation sales to reach 500,000 copies a week. The comic was temporarily suspended but resumed in 1978.

== Later life and death ==
In 2007, Carlos Monsiváis, who is a patron of the arts, opened the Museo del Estanquillo with an exhibition of Vargas' La Familia Burrón paintings with the artist in person. The Burrón Family were represented in painted forms by Regino Burrón and Borola Tacuche de Burrón, Regino and Foforito. Vargas sat paralyzed because of an affiction he had suffered for the past twenty years.

The Consejo Nacional para la Cultura y las Artes stated Vargas died on 25 May 2010 at his Mexico City home. His health had declined in recent years but no cause of death was given. According to a statement released by this council, Vargas was "one of the greatest representatives of the golden age of Mexican comics" and an "undeniable reference point for the nation’s popular culture".

== Bibliography ==
The following is a list of Vargas' various comic strips:

- Los Superlocos
- La Familia Burrón (1937–2009)
- La vida de Cristo
- Sherlock Holmes
- Pancho López
- El gran Caperuzo
- Los Chiflados
- Los del Doce
- Sopa de perico

== Awards ==
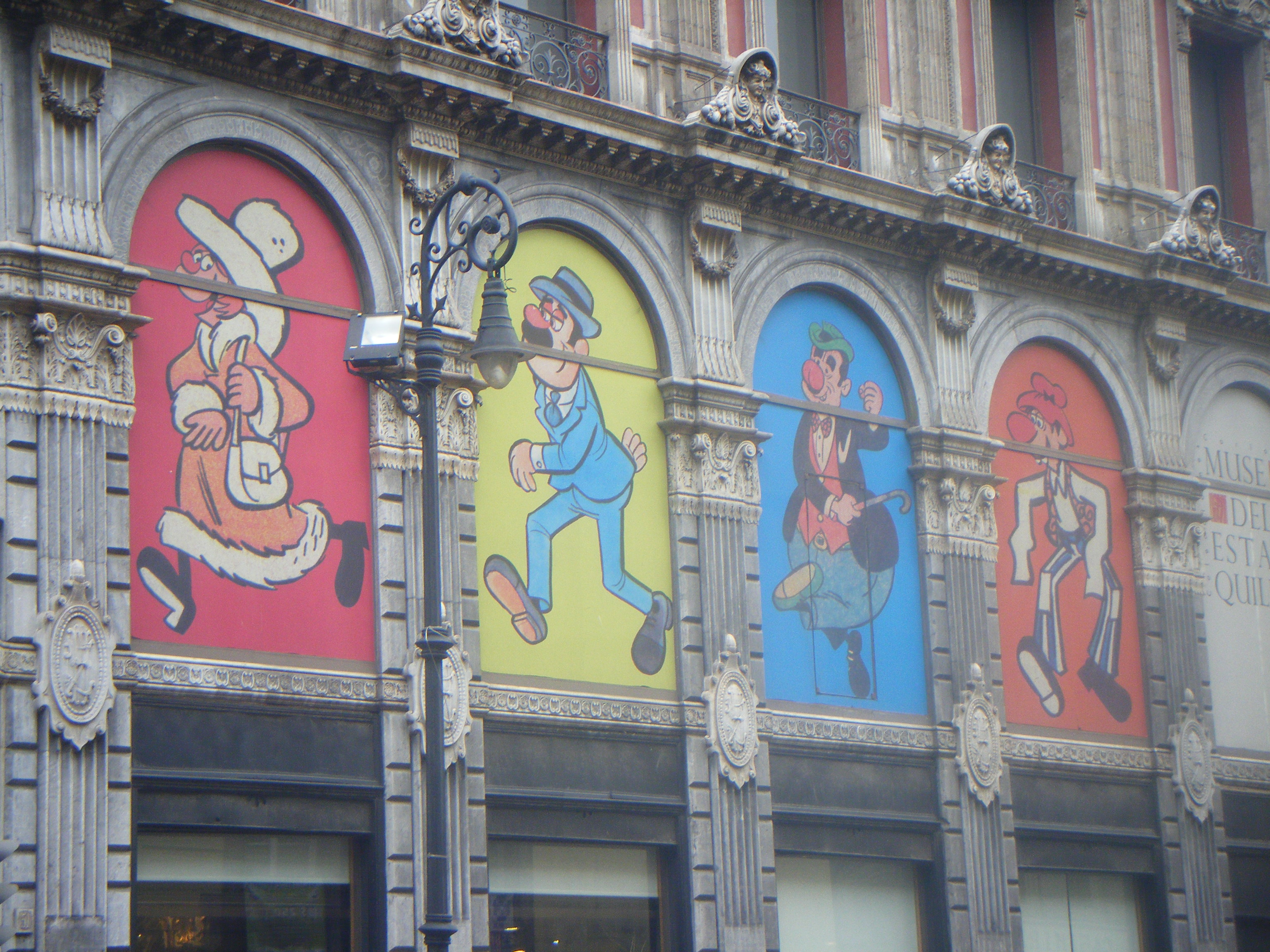
Cartoon characters created by Vargas depicted at the Museo del Estanquillo, Mexico City

In 1983, Vargas received the National Journalism Prize of Mexico in the field of Comics and Cartoons. In 2003, the "Premio Nacional de Ciencias y Artes en el área de Tradiciones Populares" (National Sciences and Arts Prize) was presented to him. In 2007, the Federal District government recognized Vargas as a Distinguished Citizen. In addition, the Estanquillo Museum collections exhibited many of his painted works as a homage. At the time of his death, a complete exhibition of La Familia Burrón was on display at a museum in Florence, Italy.
